= Butler railway station =

Railway station in Perth, Western Australia

Butler
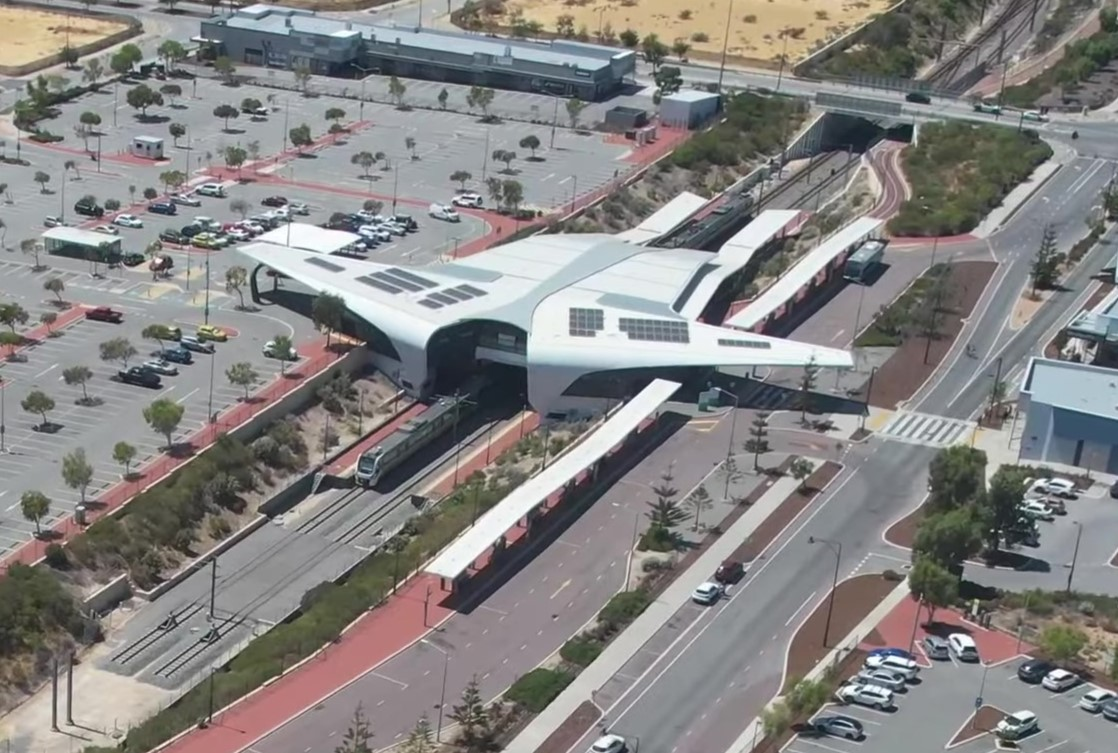
- Northbound view of Butler railway station viewed from a drone, February 2023

General information
- Location: Butler Boulevard, Exmouth Drive; Butler, Western Australia; Australia
- Coordinates: 31°38′08″S 115°42′01″E
- Owner: Public Transport Authority
- Operator: Public Transport Authority
- Line: Yanchep line
- Distance: 40.7 km (25.3 mi) from Perth Underground
- Platforms: 2 side platforms
- Tracks: 2
- Bus routes: 6
- Bus stands: 6
- Bus operators: Swan Transit

Construction
- Parking: 891 spaces
- Accessible: Yes

Other information
- Fare zone: 5

History
- Opened: 21 September 2014

Passengers
- March 2018: 2,750 per weekday

Services
Preceding station	Transperth	Following station
Clarkson towards Elizabeth Quay via Perth Underground	Yanchep line	Alkimos towards Yanchep
Location
- Location of Butler station

Butler railway station is a suburban railway station in Butler, a suburb of Perth, Western Australia. It is on Yanchep line, which is part of the Transperth rail network. Originally known as the Joondalup line, planning for an extension to Butler began in the late 1990s. The station was built as part of a A$240 million extension of the Joondalup line from Clarkson to Butler. Construction began on the station on 16 July 2012, and was completed on 16 May 2014, opening on 21 September 2014. On 14 July 2024, an extension north to Yanchep station opened, coinciding with the line's renaming to the Yanchep line.

Butler station has two side platforms situated in a cutting below the surrounding ground level. It is accessed from a ground-level concourse. Services run every 10 minutes during peak and every 15 minutes between peak. The journey to Perth Underground station is 40.7 kilometres (25.3 mi) and takes 38 minutes. The station is served by six regular bus routes, operated by Swan Transit under contract. To the south, these bus routes link to Clarkson station, and to the north, these bus routes link to Alkimos station.

== Description ==
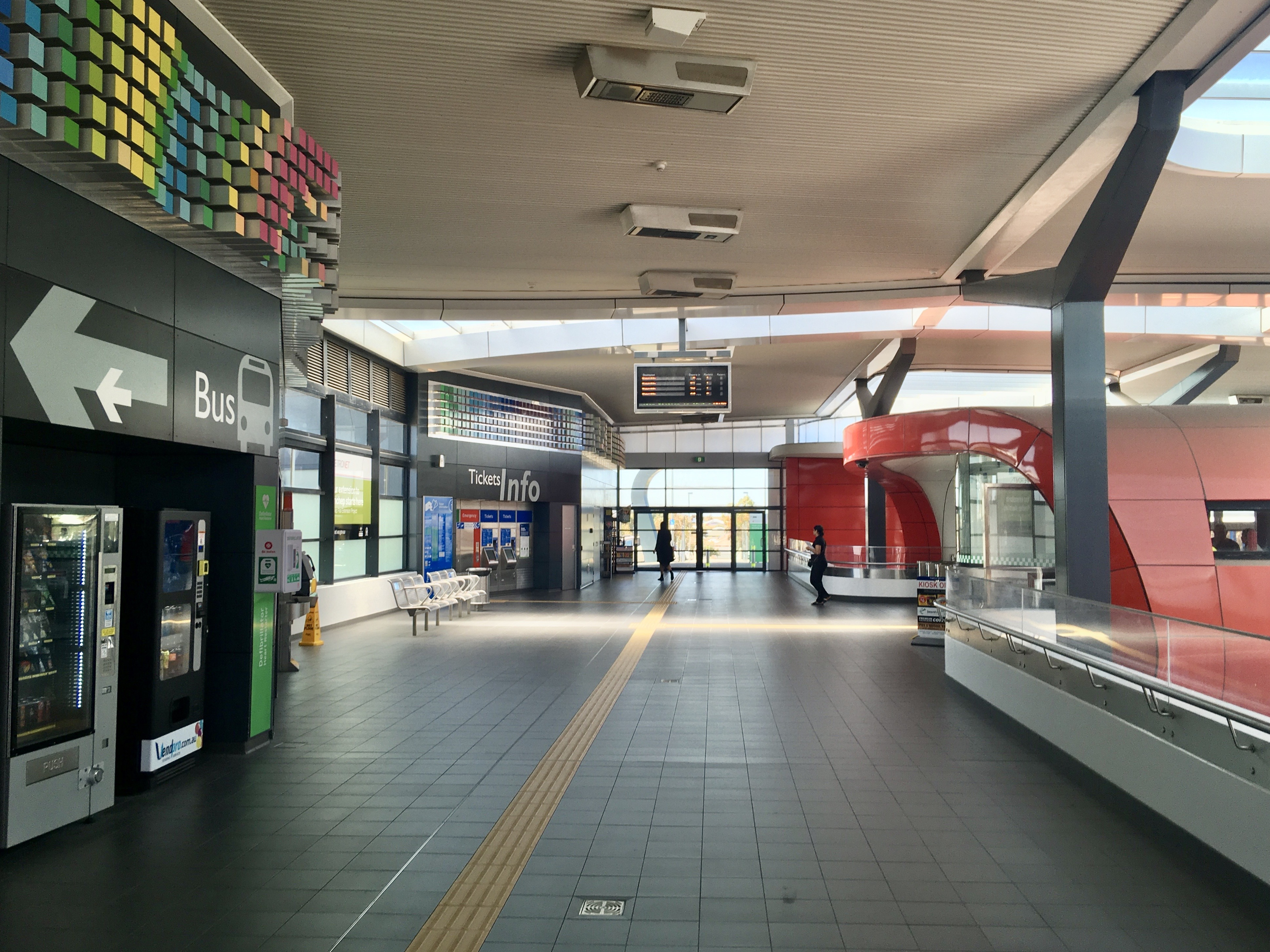
Butler station concourse

Butler station is in Butler, a suburb of Perth, Western Australia. It is located east of Exmouth Drive and north of Butler Boulevard. It is 40.7 kilometres (25.3 mi), or a 38 minute train journey, from Perth Underground station along the Yanchep line, placing the station in fare zone five. The next station to the south is Clarkson station and the next station to the north is Alkimos station.

The station consists of two side platforms situated in a cutting below ground level. The platforms are approximately 150 metres (490 ft) long, or long enough for a Transperth six-car train. At ground level is a concourse which can be used to cross over the railway or access the station. Operating hours are from approximately 5 am to 1 am, extending to 2 am on Friday and Saturday nights. Outside station operating hours, the concourse is locked. Each platform is served by an escalator, a lift, and a set of stairs, making it fully accessible. On the concourse are toilets, a kiosk, a customer service office and fare gates. It has 891 car parking bays. The station, designed by Coniglio Ainsworth Architects, received a commendation at the 2015 WA Architecture Awards.

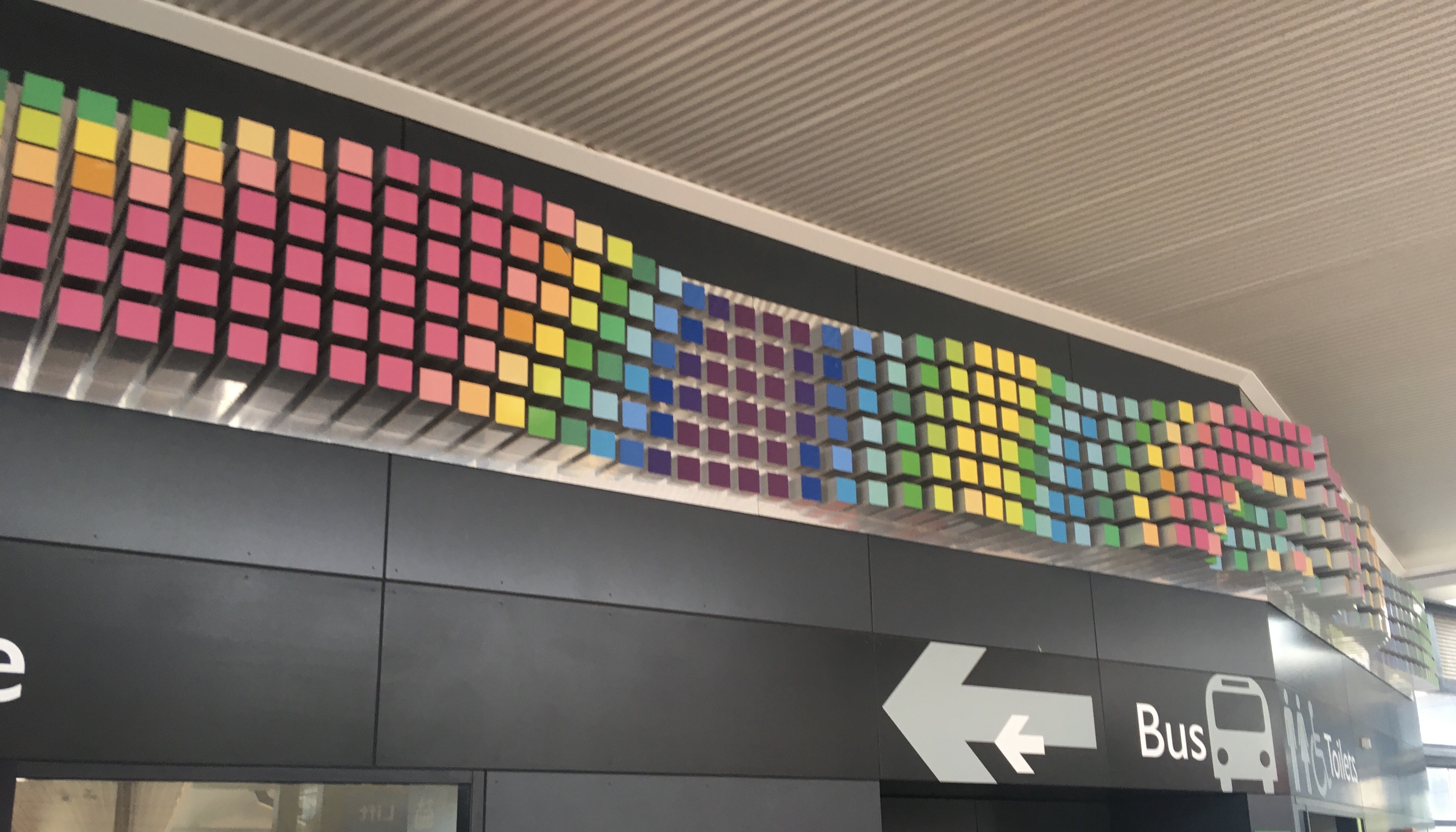
Rain on Water, by Geoffrey Drake-Brockman

Running along the 38-metre (125 ft) long station concourse wall is a piece of public art titled Rain on Water, by Geoffrey Drake-Brockman. The artwork consists of 1,200 aluminium rods with various lengths. Each rod has a brightly coloured end, with the colour depending on the height of the aluminium rod; shorter rods being on the blue end of the spectrum, and longer rods being on the red end of the spectrum. The artwork represents the ripples from raindrops falling on water, with mathematical modelling used to determine the height of each rod to make the piece of art look like a realistic wave.

== History ==
The original stage of the Joondalup line began construction in November 1989. It was opened between Perth station and Joondalup station on 20 December 1992, and extended to Currambine station on 8 August 1993. An extension to Clarkson station opened on 4 October 2004.

=== Planning and construction ===
During planning for the Joondalup line extension from Currambine station to Clarkson station in the late 1990s and early 2000s, it was recognised that the Joondalup line would be eventually extended north of Clarkson. Two potential stations were recognised: a park-and-ride station at Lukin Drive, called Butler station; and a station north of that, surrounded by a transit oriented development, called Brighton station. The name "Brighton" is a commonly used, but unofficial name for part of Butler. A$2.1 million was allocated in the 2007 state budget for planning the extension to Butler.

Before the 2008 Western Australian state election, both the Labor and Liberal parties promised to extend the Joondalup line to Butler. After the Liberal Party formed government following the election, Transport Minister Simon O'Brien said in 2009 that it was hoped that construction would start in 2011–12, and the extension would open in 2014. At the time, the number of stations on the extension was not decided.

In November 2009, the government introduced the Railway (Butler to Brighton) Bill into Parliament. The railway extension had a predicted cost of $240 million, a length of 7.5 kilometres (4.7 mi), and one station at the end of the extension, known then as Brighton station. The opposition criticised the plan to not build the station at Lukin Drive. O'Brien defended the choice of building only one station, saying that the Public Transport Authority told him it was a better idea to do so. The plan called for Brighton station to be a park and ride station, as the previously planned station at Lukin Drive was not going to be built. At this time, preliminary earthworks had begun. The bill passed in July 2010.

The first of the main contracts for the project was awarded to R J Vincent & Co in December 2010. The contract was worth $6 million, and was for 4 kilometres (2.5 mi) of earthworks between the entrance of the Nowergup depot near Hester Avenue, and Landbeach Boulevard, joining up with the earthworks done previously north of Landbeach Boulevard. The earthworks for double tracks had already been completed during the construction of a single track between Clarkson station and Nowergup depot. The next major contract was awarded on 20 May 2011 to a joint venture between Bocol Constructions and R J Vincent & Co. The $9.8 million contract was for the construction of bridges across the railway corridor and associated roadworks. The bridges were at Butler Boulevard, Landbeach Boulevard and Benendin Avenue. The contract also included the construction of 1.8 kilometres (1.1 mi) of Principal Shared Path. Bocal constructed the bridges and concrete walls; R J Vincent did the road construction, earthworks, traffic management, and everything else not under Bocal's scope. The station design was approved by a Joint Development Assessment Panel on 5 December 2011. A $22 million contract for the construction of Butler station was awarded to Cooper and Oxley in July 2012, and construction on the station began on 16 July 2012.

By October 2012, earthworks and the construction of the three bridges were complete. That month, construction on the railway tracks and overhead power lines began, after the $24 million contract for that was awarded to John Holland. 13 kilometres (8.1 mi) of track was laid between Clarkson station and Butler station, and 5.4 kilometres (3.4 mi) of track in the Nowergup depot. The single track between Clarkson station and Nowergup depot was duplicated, and a double track was constructed between Nowergup depot and Butler station. In November 2012, a $19.7 million contract was signed with Ansaldo STS Australia to design and construct the railway signalling system for the extension. Included in the funding for the project were four new Transperth B-series trains and 11 new buses. The construction of the station was completed on 16 May 2014. Over the following months, works on the tracks, signalling and overhead electrical systems continued.

=== Commissioning and opening ===
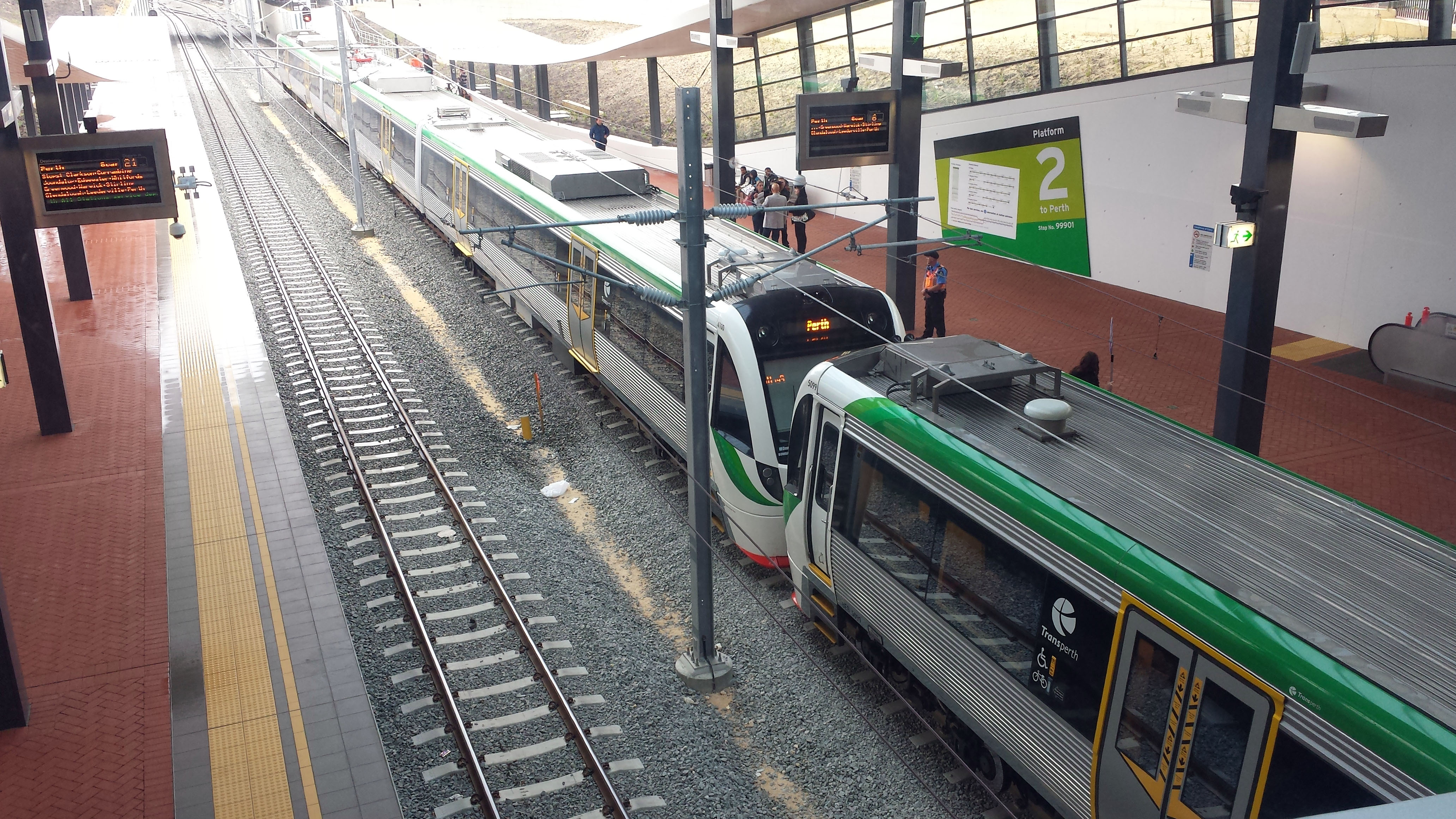
Butler station tracks and platforms viewed from concourse on the day of opening

The first train ran on the extension on 25 August 2014, with train driver familiarisation beginning after that. The station was opened on 21 September 2014 by Premier Colin Barnett and Minister for Transport Dean Nalder, several months early and $20 million under budget.

Some nearby residents experienced excessive vibrations when trains passed their homes. 178 people signed a petition saying that they and their homes were "severely and adversely impacted" by vibrations from trains. 850 metres (2,790 ft) of acoustic matting was used for the extension, but it was not used for the tracks closest to Butler station, where the complaints were coming from. Nalder said that computer modelling was used to determine where to place the acoustic matting, based on ground conditions, geography and track geometry. He also said that the PTA would monitor noise and vibrations over the coming months. On 12 October 2014, 50 residents gathered around the railway line to protest against the vibrations. Opposition leader Mark McGowan, Member for Butler John Quigley and Shadow Transport Minister Ken Travers attended the protest as well. McGowan said that the 850 metres (2,790 ft) of matting was not enough. Nalder reiterated that the government was undertaking vibration monitoring. In December 2014, the results of noise monitoring were released. The monitoring found that noise and vibration levels near Butler station were within acceptable standards, but noise and vibrations were above acceptable levels at Kilkee Street, near Nowergup depot. The PTA said that a larger earth noise wall would be built there.

Before opening, the projected patronage for the station was 2,000 people per day. The station reached that patronage nine days after opening. In August 2015, the station had 2,022 daily boardings, with a total of 600,000 in its first year of operation. Boardings on buses in the surrounding area were also up by 13% compared to before the station opened. In March 2018, Butler station had approximately 2,750 boardings on an average weekday, making it the seventh busiest station on the Joondalup line.

=== Railway extension north of Butler ===
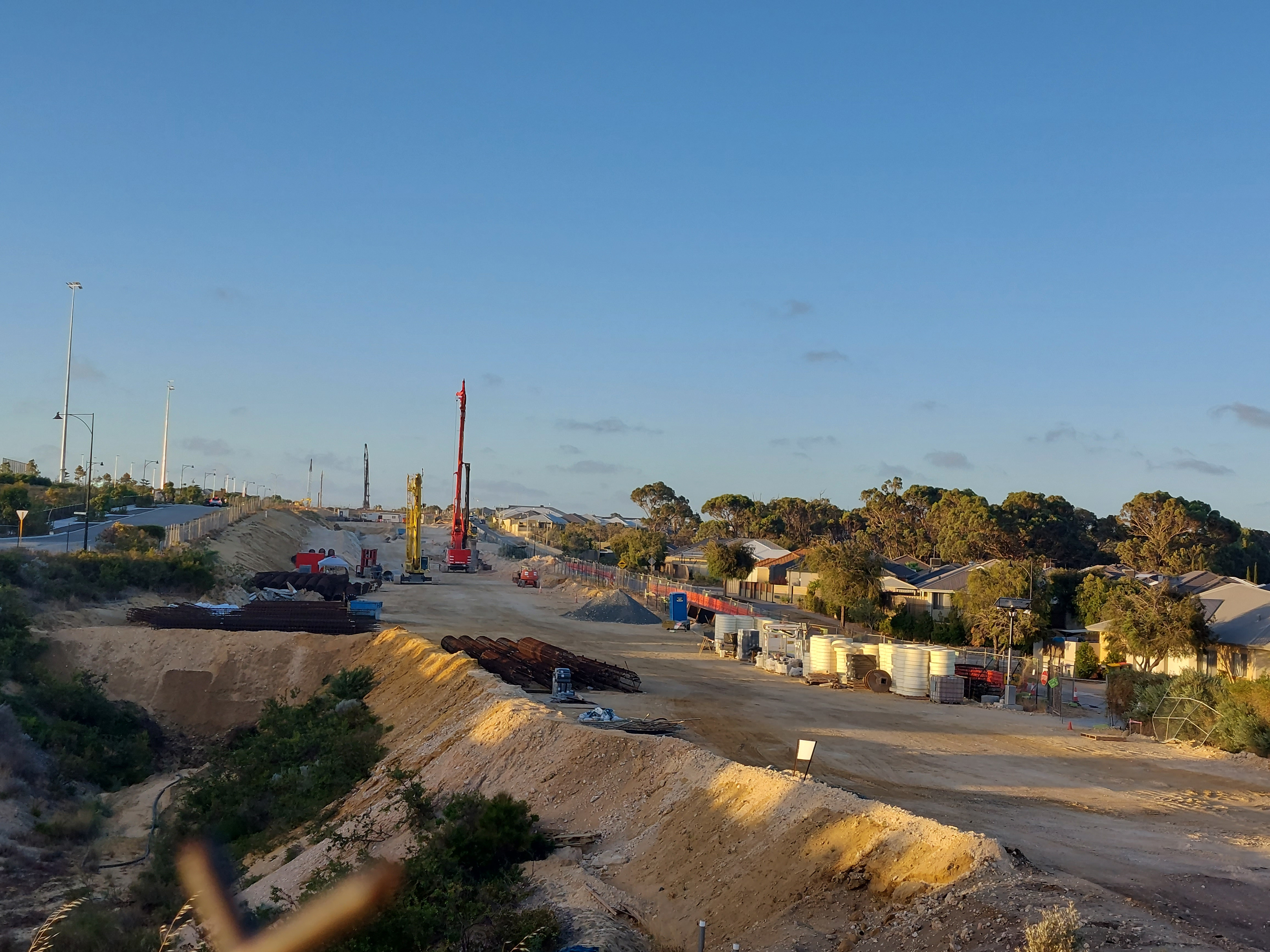
Construction work on the extension north to Yanchep in January 2023

In late 2019, construction started on extending the Joondalup line north 14.5 kilometres (9.0 mi) to Yanchep, with three new stations. As part of the extension, the platforms at Butler station were lengthened. The extension to Yanchep opened on 14 July 2024.

== Services ==
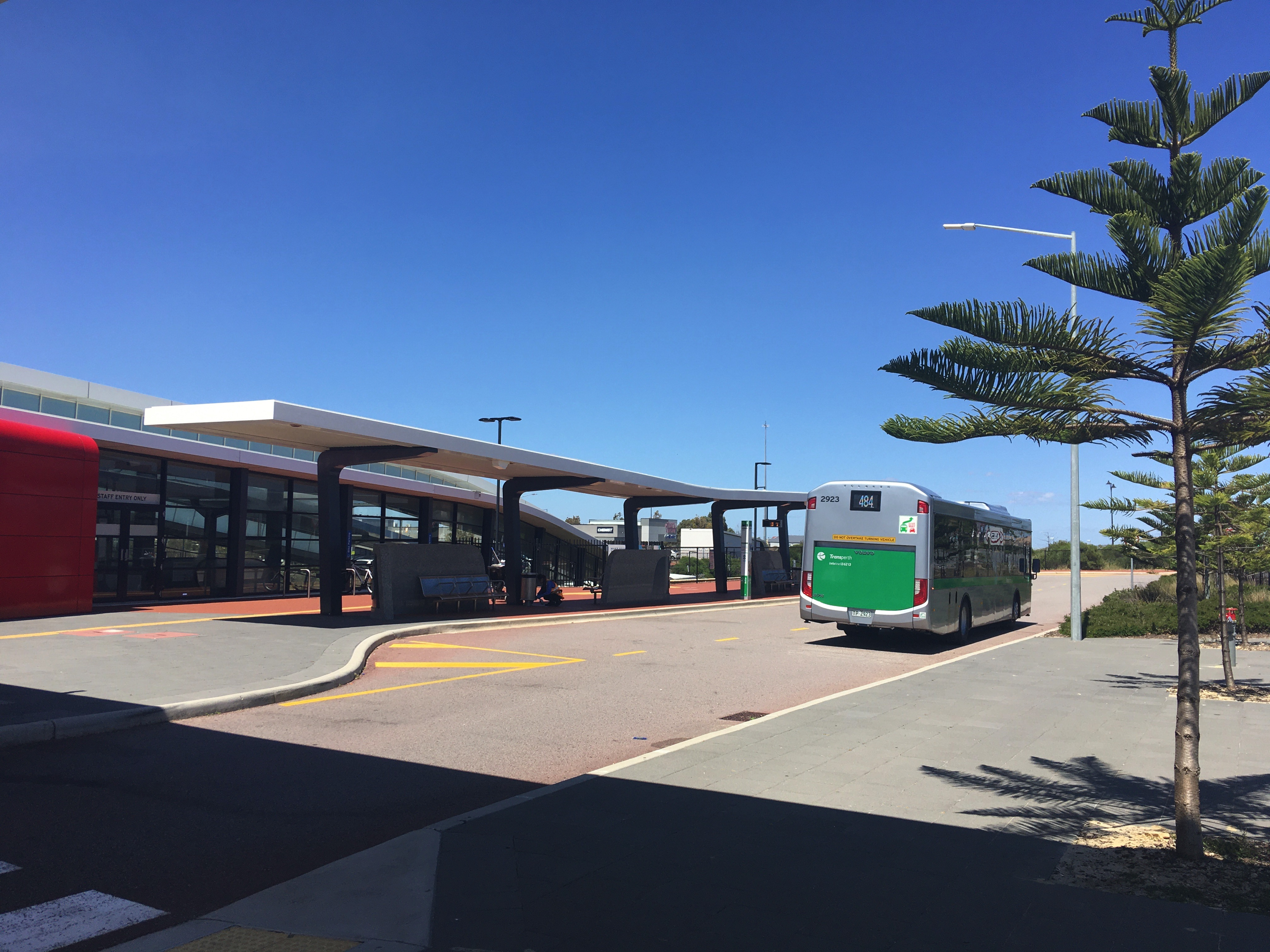
Butler station bus interchange in October 2021

Butler station is served by the Yanchep line on the Transperth network. Services are operated by the Public Transport Authority. The line goes between Yanchep station and Elizabeth Quay station in the Perth central business district, continuing south from there as the Mandurah line. Yanchep line trains depart the station every 10 minutes during peak on weekdays, and every 15 minutes outside peak, and on weekends and public holidays. Christmas Day has a different timetable to other public holidays. At night time, trains are half-hourly or hourly.

== Platforms ==
Butler platform arrangement
Stop ID	Platform	Line	Service Pattern	Destination	Via	Notes
99901	1	Yanchep line	All stations	Elizabeth Quay	Perth Underground	
99902	2	Yanchep line	All stations	Yanchep		

== Bus Routes ==
The bus interchange has six bus stands with 8 regular bus routes. Buses run to Clarkson railway station, Alkimos railway station, and Trinity Estate in Alkimos. Train replacement buses operate on route 904. Bus services are operated by Swan Transit under contract.

Stop	Route	Destination / description	Notes
Stand 1	481	to Clarkson station via Marmion Avenue & Santa Barbara Parade	
Stand 1	482	to Clarkson station via Marmion Avenue	
Stand 1	904	Rail replacement service to Perth station	
Stand 2	483	to Clarkson station via Merriwa	
Stand 2	484	to Clarkson station via Ridgewood	
Stand 3	485	to Alkimos station via Mirrabillis Avenue	Services to commence after completion of Mirrabillis Avenue
Stand 4		Set down only	
Stand 5	486	to Alkimos station via Marmion Avenue	
Stand 5	904	Rail replacement service to Yanchep station	
Stand 6	487	to Alkimos (Trinity Estate) via Santorini Promenade & Piazza Link	
Stand 6	488	to Alkimos (Trinity Estate) via Benenden Avenue	
