= New MetroRail =

Former division of the PTA in Perth, Western Australia

New MetroRail was a division of the Public Transport Authority in Western Australia. It was responsible for managing extensions to Perth's railway network. The project doubled Perth's rail network, which is operated by Transperth, and was completed in 2007, after various projects were completed. Costing $1.6 billion, the project was the largest public transport project ever undertaken by the Western Australian government and effectively doubled the size of Perth's railway network. A similar agency Metronet was created in 2017 for future Perth rail extensions.

== History ==
In December 1994, the Metropolitan Region Scheme was amended to include the original route for the Mandurah line, via Kenwick, using the existing Woodbridge to Kwinana freight line, and the Armadale line. In July 1995, the Court Liberal government announced it would build the new line to Mandurah (via Kenwick), and committed to completing the line from Kenwick to Jandakot by 2005.

In April 1997, the same government approved funding for the South West Metropolitan Railway Master Plan. The Master Plan was completed in April 2000. In June of the same year, the plan for the Currambine to Butler extension was released, which formed part of the Northern Suburbs Railway Interim Master Plan.

In February 2001, the Gallop Labor government was elected. In August 2002, that government announced that the rail alignment from Jandakot to Perth would run in the median of the Kwinana Freeway, and not via Kenwick as previously planned. In December 2007, the Mandurah line opened, meaning that the project was complete.

The Perth Urban Rail Development Project was renamed in March 2003 to New MetroRail. The organisation had an information centre in the Perth central business district for the public to obtain information on New MetroRail projects.

== Projects ==
=== Northern suburbs railway ===
Works on the northern suburbs line within the project included:

- Acquisition of relevant lands, funded from the 2000/2001 state budget
- The construction of a new Currambine station to a location within the middle of the Mitchell Freeway road reserve, along with associated approach works
- Demolition of the previous Currambine station, including associated sidings and rolling stock cleaning facilities
- Construction of Clarkson station and associated works
- A new station at Greenwood, Greenwood station
- Construction of a rail bridge at Burns Beach Road
- Construction of a road bridge at Hester Avenue
- Construction of the new Nowergup railway depot
- Construction of the rail reserve and 4 km of railway track from Burns Beach Road to Nowgerup, along with associated necessary works including communications and signalling
- Upgrade of existing station platforms along the line to a length of 144 m to accommodate 6-carriage rolling stock
- The purchase and delivery of new railcars at a cost of A$23 million (2000)

=== Southern suburbs railway ===
- Construction of eight new stations: Bull Creek, Murdoch, Cockburn Central, Kwinana, Wellard, Rockingham, Warnbro and Mandurah
- Conversion of the existing Canning Bridge transfer station into Canning Bridge railway station, including modifications of lower-level platforms to suit rail, and to bus bridges
- Track infrastructure
- Realignment of Kwinana Freeway carriageways and construction of concrete crash barrier
- Strengthening of the existing western Narrows Bridge
- Construction of a new rail bridge between the existing Narrows Bridge carriageways
- Widening and strengthening of Mount Henry Bridge
- Construction of a tunnel in Anketell and Glen Iris, Jandakot
- Construction of a new storage and cleaning facility at Mandurah

=== City works ===
- Construction of new underground platforms at Perth Station under William Street
- Construction of a new underground station at The Esplanade
- Construction of twin bored tunnels under the CBD
- Construction of cut and cover tunnel and open dive structure along Perth foreshore

=== Thornlie spur line ===
- Construction of Thornlie station and the Thornlie line
- Construction of an electrified spur line from the Armadale line near Kenwick
- Construction of stage 2 of the Kenwick Tunnel
- Construction of a rail bridge over the Canning River

=== Victoria Park works ===
- Construction of a new Victoria Park station
- Demolition of Lathlain station
- Renovation of Carlisle station
- Construction of a new road over rail bridge at Miller Street, Victoria Park
- Construction of a new road over rail bridge at Gerard Street, Cannington
- Construction of a new shared bicycle-pedestrian bridge at Howick Street, Victoria Park

== Sources ==
- Higham, Geoffrey (2007). Marble Bar to Mandurah: A History of Passenger Rail Services in Western Australia (1st ed.). Bassendean: Rail Heritage WA. ISBN 978-0-9803922-0-3. OCLC 271545712. Wikidata Q140375689.
