= Elizabeth Quay station =

Elizabeth Quay station may refer to:

- Elizabeth Quay bus station in Perth, Australia
- Elizabeth Quay railway station in Perth, Australia
