= Geoffrey Drake-Brockman =

Geoffrey Drake-Brockman may refer to:

- Geoffrey Drake-Brockman (artist) (born 1964), Australian artist known for incorporating robotics and lasers into his work
- Geoffrey Drake-Brockman (engineer) (1885–1977), Western Australian civil engineer and Australian Army officer in both World Wars
