= Clarkson railway station, Perth =

Railway station in Perth, Western Australia

Clarkson
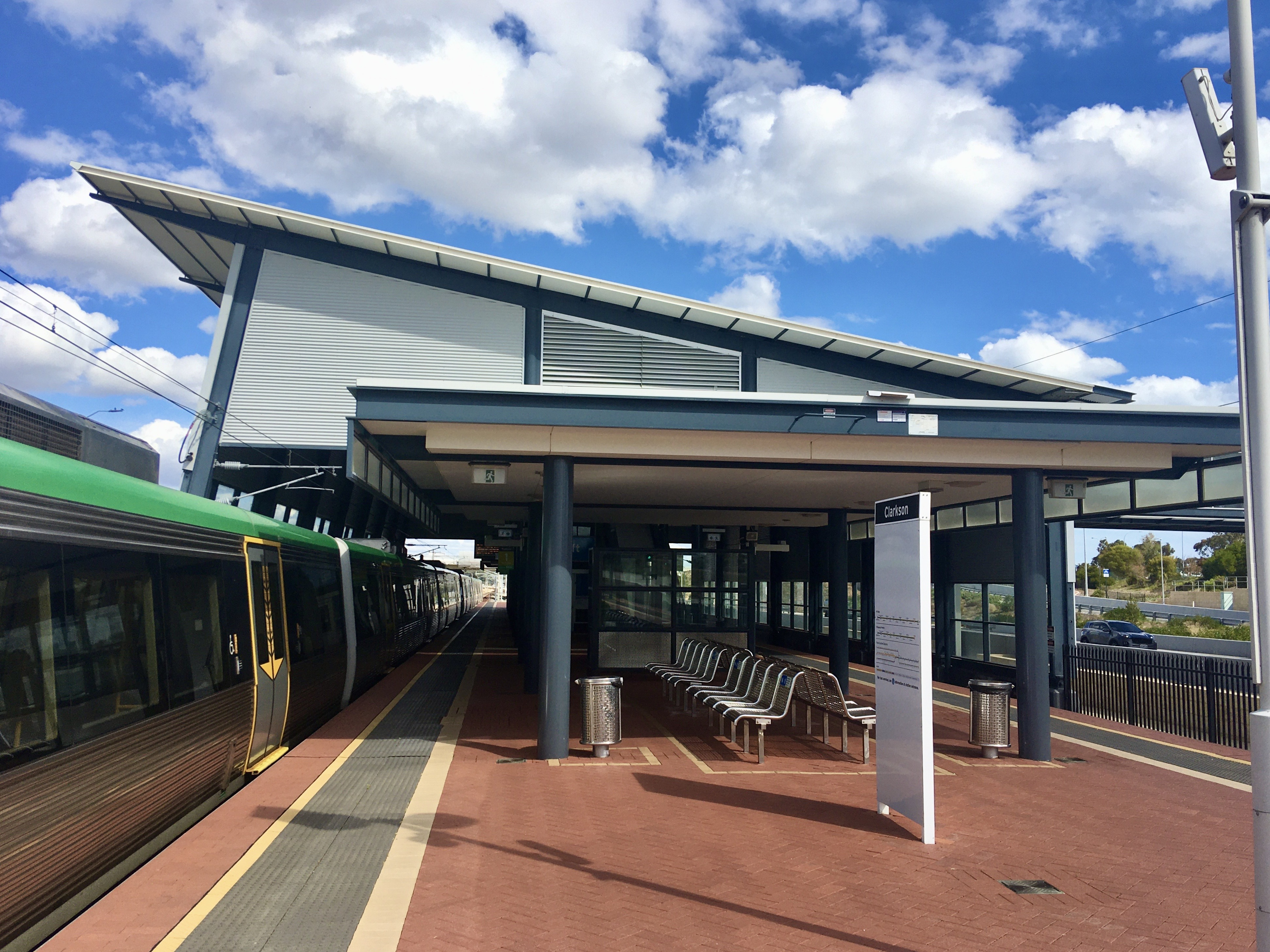
- Southbound view, December 2021

General information
- Location: Orenco Bend, Clarkson; Western Australia; Australia
- Coordinates: 31°41′27″S 115°44′17″E
- Owner: Public Transport Authority
- Operator: Public Transport Authority
- Line: Yanchep line
- Distance: 33.2 kilometres (20.6 mi) from Perth Underground
- Platforms: 1 island platform with 2 platform edges
- Tracks: 2
- Bus routes: 6
- Bus stands: 6

Construction
- Parking: 1,059
- Accessible: Yes

Other information
- Fare zone: 4

History
- Opened: 4 October 2004

Passengers
- March 2018: 2,850 per day

Services
Preceding station	Transperth	Following station
Currambine towards Elizabeth Quay via Perth Underground	Yanchep line All	Butler towards Yanchep
Currambine towards Elizabeth Quay via Perth Underground	Yanchep line K	Terminus
Location
- Location of Clarkson station

Clarkson railway station is a suburban rail station in Clarkson, a suburb of Perth, Western Australia. It is on the Yanchep line, which is part of the Transperth network. Located in the median of the Mitchell Freeway, the station consists of an island platform connected to the west by a pedestrian footbridge. A six-stand bus interchange and two carparks are located near the entrance.

Planning for an extension of the Yanchep line (then known as the Joondalup line) north of Currambine station was underway by 1995. The government committed to an extension to Clarkson the following year, and a plan detailing the extension was released in 2000. The first contract for the project, a A$14 million earthworks contract, was awarded to Brierty Contractors in March 2001. In April 2002, Barclay Mowlem and Alstom were awarded a contract worth $17 million to design and build the extension's rail infrastructure, and in November 2002, a $8.7 million contract was awarded to Transfield for the construction of the station. The station opened on 4 October 2004, with five new Transperth B-series trains entering service that day. The following day, bus services in the area were realigned to feed into Clarkson station. On 3 September 2013, there was a minor train crash at Clarkson station. On 21 September 2014, an extension of the Joondalup line 7.5 kilometres (4.7 mi) north to Butler station opened.

Clarkson station is 33.2 kilometres (20.6 mi) from Perth Underground station, with train journeys there taking 32 minutes. Train headways reach as low as five minutes during peak hour, with off-peak services at 15-minute headways. Six bus routes serve Clarkson station.

== Description ==
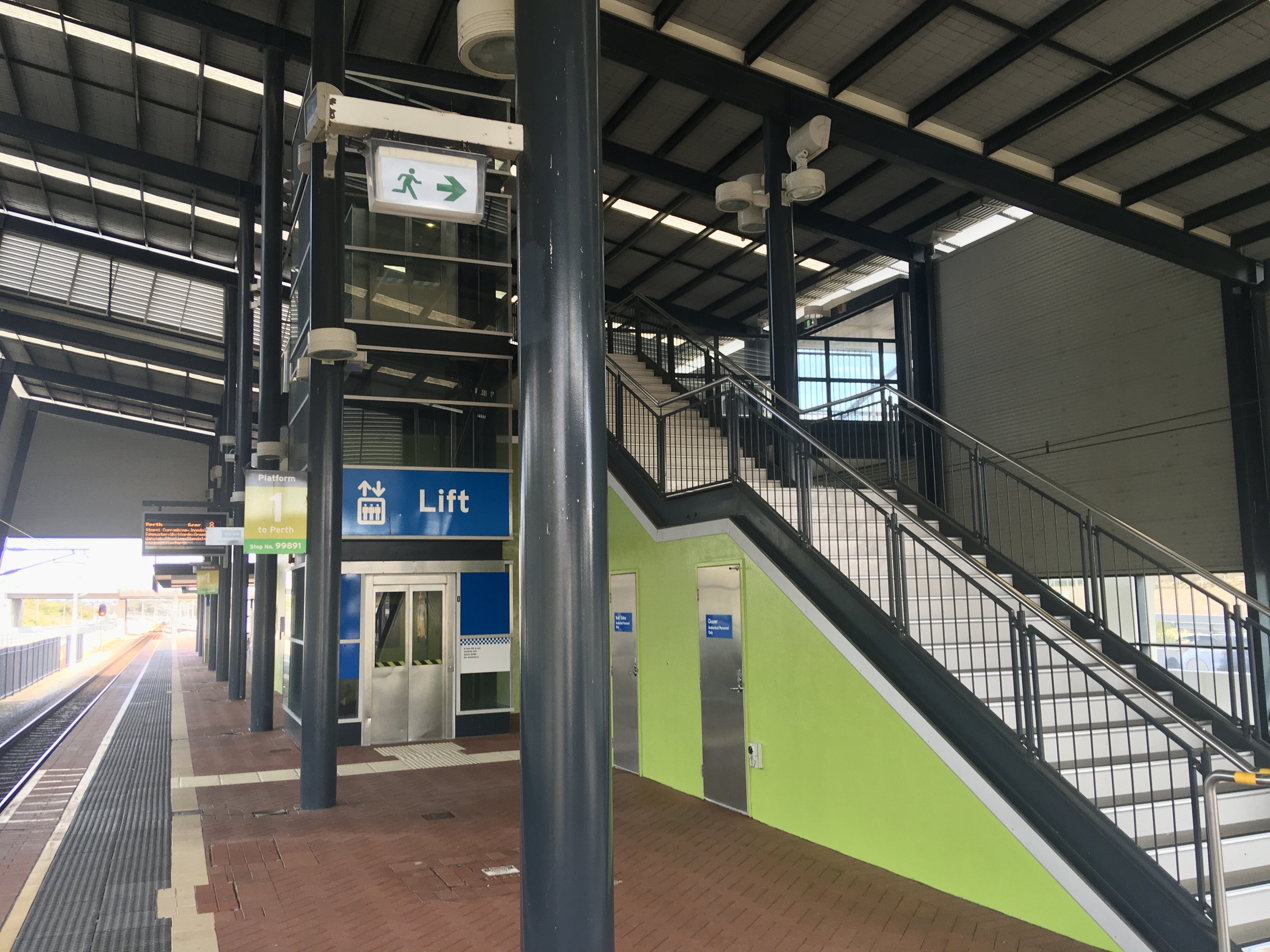
Stairs and lift up to the station's footbridge.

Clarkson station is in the median of the Mitchell Freeway along the Yanchep line. It is owned by the Public Transport Authority (PTA), a state government agency, and is part of the Transperth system. The station is in Clarkson, a suburb of Perth, Western Australia. It is 33.2 kilometres (20.6 mi), or a 32-minute train journey, from Perth Underground station, placing the station in fare zone four. The next station to the north is Butler station and the next station to the south is Currambine station.

The station consists of two platform faces on a single island platform. The platform is 150-metre (490 ft) long, or long enough for a Transperth six-car train – the longest trains used on the network. The platforms are linked to the west by a pedestrian bridge. To the east is Neerabup National Park, and so there is no access to the east. The pedestrian bridge is linked to the platforms by stairs, a lift and a set of escalators. On the western side is a six-stand bus interchange, a drop off area and two carparks. The carparks have 1,059 standard bays, 10 short term parking bays and 20 motorcycle bays. At the entrance building is a transit officer booth, toilets and bicycle parking shelters. Clarkson is listed as an independent access station on the Transperth website as the platform can be accessed using lifts, the platform gap is small, and tactile paving is in place.

=== Public art ===
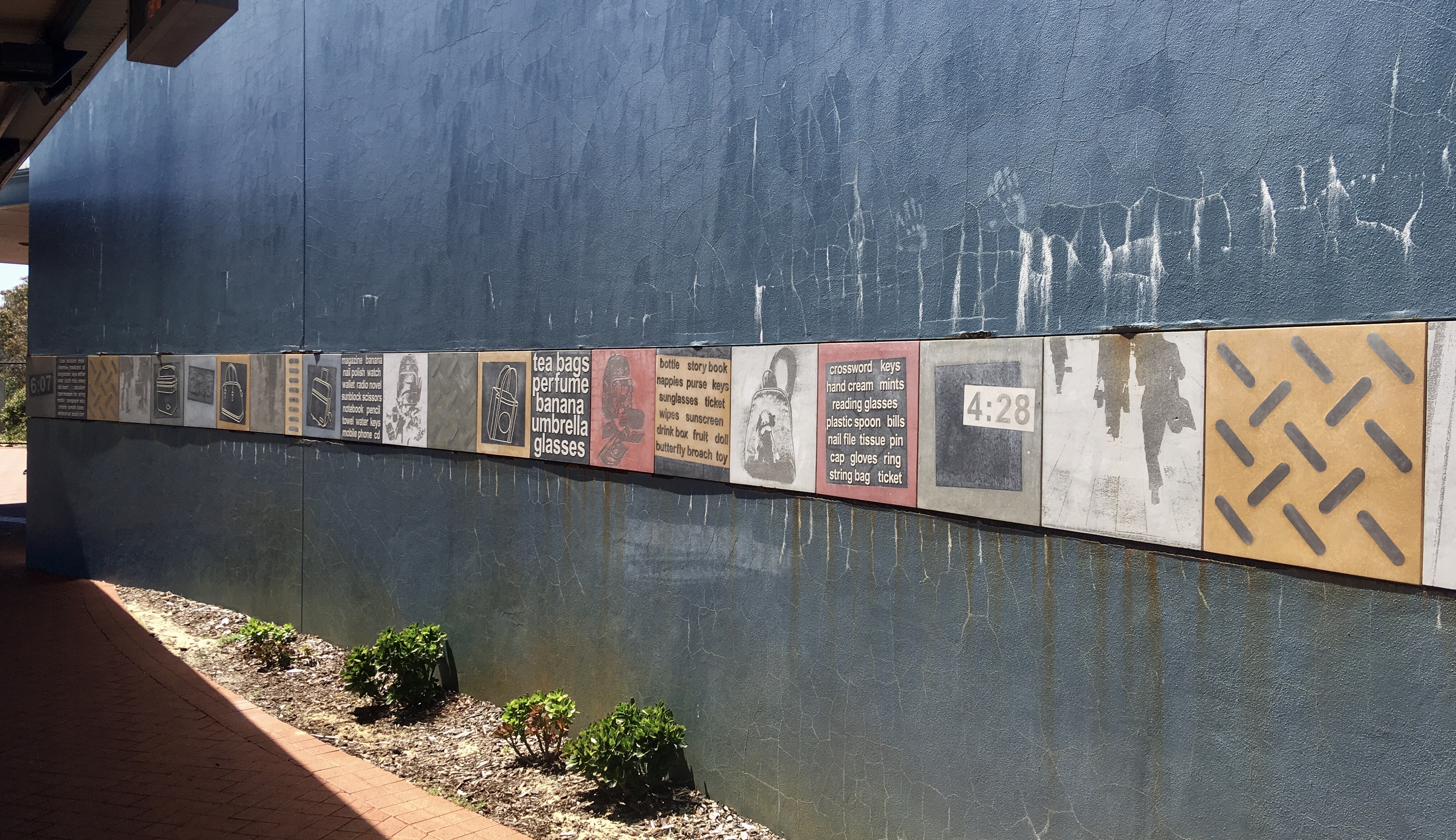
The Bag Project, by Margaret Dillon.

On the wall of the entrance building is a piece of public art titled The Bag Project, by Margaret Dillon from art design and construction company Concreto. It consists of a series of 44 500-by-500-millimetre (20 by 20 in) terrazzo tiles. The tiles, which have various colours, "depict images associated with the everyday commuter experience". The other piece of public art at Clarkson station is Line over Contour, by Stuart Green. This consists of stainless steel and painted steel panels mounted on a steel tower above the entrance building.

== History ==
The original stage of the Yanchep line (formerly known as the Joondalup line) began construction in November 1989. It was opened between Perth station and Joondalup station on 20 December 1992, and extended to Currambine station on 8 August 1993. By 1995, planning for extending the Joondalup line north of Currambine was underway. On 20 November 1996, a few weeks before the 1996 state election, Richard Court, the premier of Western Australia, announced that his government would extend the railway to Neerabup Road in Clarkson by the end of 2001 at a cost of A$28 million, plus $12 million for additional rolling stock. This came in response to a pledge by the opposition Labor Party to build the extension for $25 million. Court claimed that Labor's costing was unrealistically low.

In June 1999, the minister for transport, Murray Criddle, revealed that the Clarkson extension would not open by 2001 as originally promised. On 28 November 1999, the Parliament of Western Australia passed the Railway Northern and Southern Urban Extension Bill, enabling the construction for the extension to Clarkson and a new railway to Mandurah south of Perth to begin. The Northern Rail Master Plan was released on 21 June 2000, detailing the extension to Clarkson as well as the construction of Greenwood station elsewhere on the Joondalup line. The cost of the extension had been revised to $58 million plus $23 million for rolling stock. The new railway to Mandurah, the extension to Clarkson and the new station at Greenwood were all brought into a single project called the Perth Urban Rail Development Project (renamed New MetroRail in March 2003). Clarkson station was going to be built just north of Neerabup Road, with 4 kilometres (2.5 mi) of new double-track railway to be built. The railway was to bridge over Burns Beach Road and go under Neerabup Road. Transport Minister Criddle was hoping for the extension to open by September 2003, which was criticised by the opposition as a broken promise. In October 2000, Court said that the cost was now $99 million for the extension to Clarkson.

The first contract for the extension was awarded in March 2001, when Brierty Contractors signed a $14 million earthworks contract. Work began in May 2001. Earthworks were completed in November 2002. In July 2001, the contract for the construction of the rail bridge over Burns Beach Road was awarded to Transfield Pty Ltd at a cost of $1.7 million. The transport minister, now Alannah MacTiernan, was still confident in the service commencement date of September 2003. The Burns Beach Road bridge was completed on 6 May 2003. In April 2002, Barclay Mowlem and Alstom were awarded a contract worth $17 million for the rail infrastructure for the extension. This contract included the design and construction of the track, traction power, signalling and communications systems. It also included work at Greenwood station. In May 2002, the government signed a contract with EDI Rail–Bombardier Transportation for the delivery and maintenance of 31 three car B-series trains, and the construction of the Nowergup depot 2 kilometres (1.2 mi) north of Clarkson station. The initial batch of those trains was scheduled to be commissioned in September 2004 for the Clarkson extension. The same month, it was revealed that the project's completion date was now September 2004. In November 2002, it was announced that an $8.7 million contract had been awarded to Transfield for the construction of Clarkson station. When John Holland Group bought Transfield in January 2003, that company took over the project.

By July 2004, the rail infrastructure was complete and the station was almost done. On 4 October 2004, the station opened, making it the first extension of Perth's rail network since the extension to Currambine in 1993. Five new B-series trains went into operation that day. In celebration of the opening, travel on Transperth train services was free that day, costing the state $50,000. Bus services to Clarkson station commenced on 5 October 2004.

At 6:30 am on 3 September 2013, an empty train travelling at low speed crashed into an occupied train carrying about 40 passengers stopped at Clarkson station. Three people were taken to hospital as a precaution, and five people suffered sore necks due to the crash. Following the crash, the Public Transport Authority investigated whether Portuguese millipedes were the cause. When crushed by train wheels, the millipedes can make the track slippery. There had been previous cases on the Transperth network where trains had overrun platforms due to the millipedes. Later that week, the tracks around the station were sprayed with insecticide. Later, the Rail Tram and Bus Union said that it was unsafe shunting practise that caused the crash, not the millipedes.

On 21 September 2014, an extension of the Joondalup line 7.5 kilometres (4.7 mi) north to Butler station opened. In 2017, the Mitchell Freeway was extended up to Hester Avenue north of the station, passing through Clarkson. The freeway's carriageways were built along both sides of Clarkson station. On 14 July 2024, the line was further extended to its current terminus at Yanchep station, and the Joondalup line was renamed the Yanchep line.

== Services ==
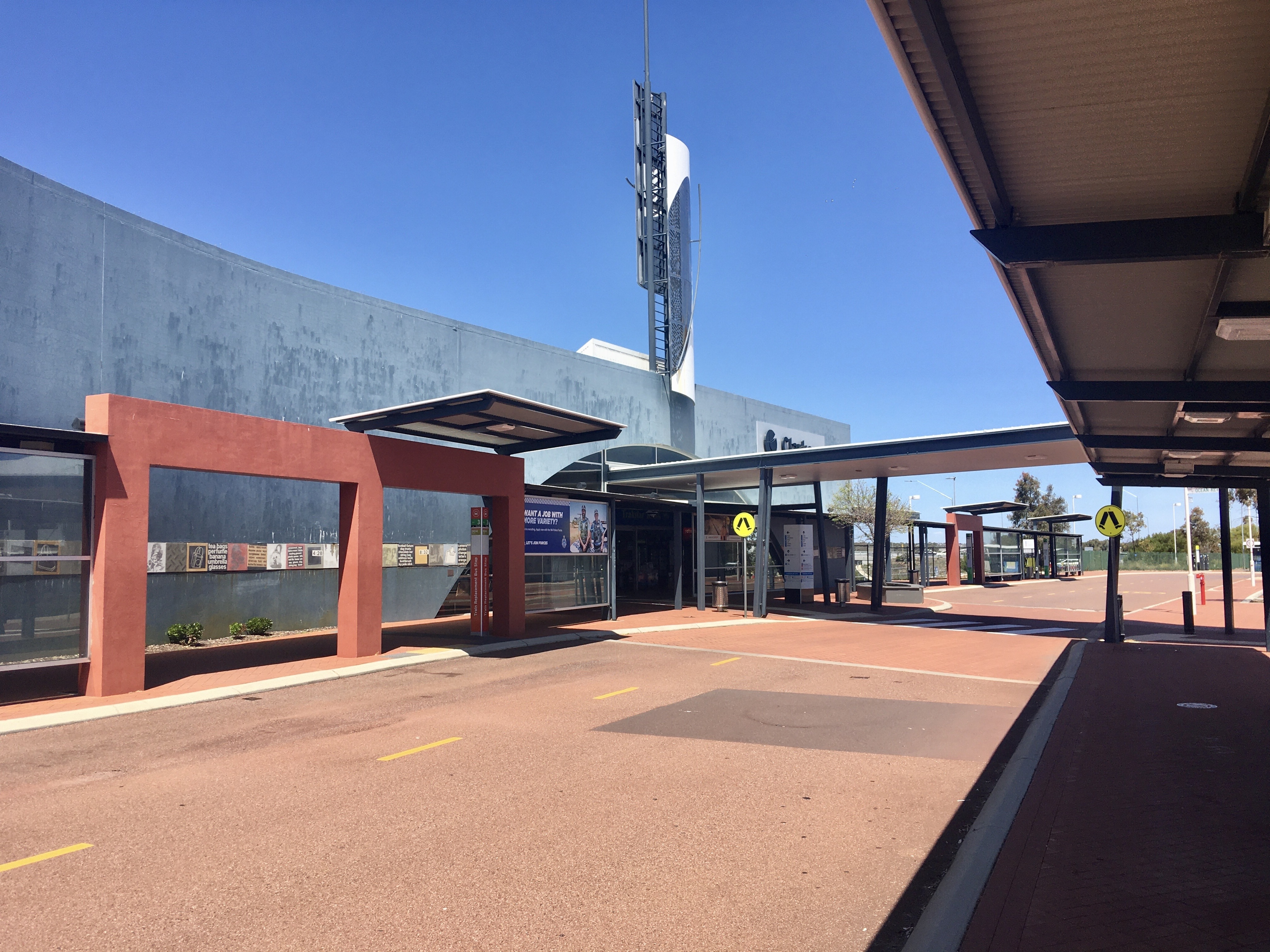
Bus interchange and entrance building. Line over Contour, by Stuart Green, can be seen above the entrance.

Clarkson station is served by Yanchep line trains operated by the PTA. The line goes between Yanchep station and Elizabeth Quay in the Perth central business district, continuing south from there as the Mandurah line.

During the middle of peak hour, trains stop at the station every 10 minutes. At the start of peak hour, southbound trains stop at the station approximately every 5 minutes, with half of those services commencing at Clarkson station after exiting the Nowergup railway depot. At the end of peak hour, northbound trains stop at the station approximately every 5 minutes, with half of those services terminating at Clarkson station to enter the Nowergup railway depot. Services that terminate or start at Clarkson station are part of the K stopping pattern. During weekday between peak hour, on weekends and public holidays, trains stop at Clarkson station every 15 minutes. At night, trains are half-hourly or hourly. In the 2013–14 financial year, Clarkson station had 1,367,712 people board, making it the fifth busiest of the stations on the Yanchep line. In March 2018, Clarkson station had approximately 2,850 boardings on an average weekday, making it still the fifth busiest station on the line.

Bus services are operated by Swan Transit under contract from the PTA. Six regular bus routes serve the station. Route 474 links to Joondalup station, passing through Kinross. Routes 480, 482, 483 and 484 link to Butler station, passing through suburbs including Butler, Jindalee, Merriwa, Mindarie, Quinns Rocks and Ridgewood. Route 481 goes northwest from Butler station, terminating at the coast in Quinns Rocks. Rail replacement bus services operate as route 904.
