= Transperth B-series train =

Type of Transperth train

Transperth B-series
- A B-series train at Thornlie station

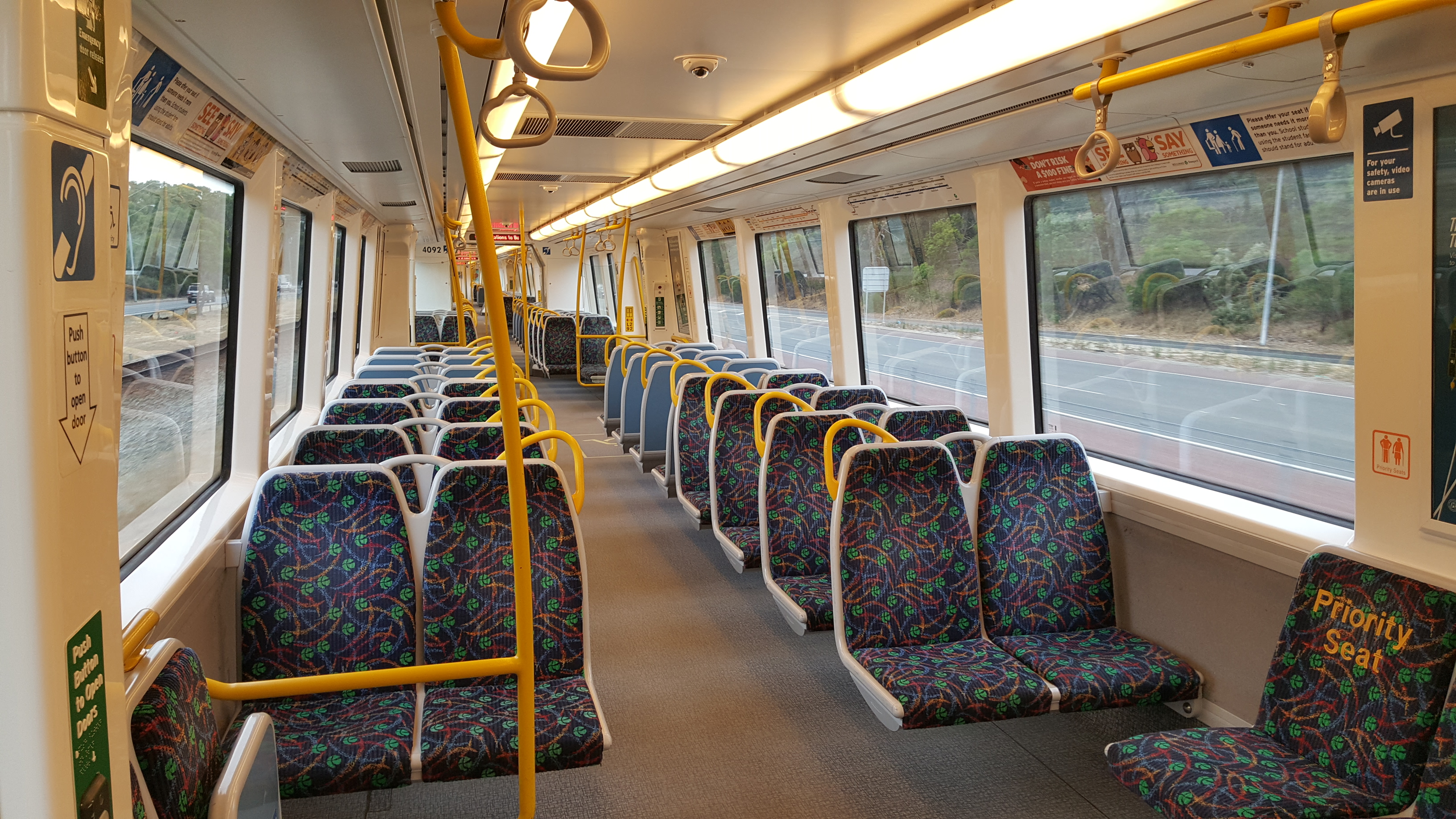
- Interior of set 092
- In service: 2004–present
- Manufacturers: Downer Rail and Bombardier
- Built at: Maryborough, Queensland
- Constructed: 2004–2019
- Entered service: 2004
- Number built: 234 carriages (78 sets)
- Number in service: 234 carriages (78 sets)
- Predecessor: A-series
- Successor: C-series
- Formation: 3-car sets
- Fleet numbers: 049–126; BEA: 4049–4126; BET: 6049–6126; BEB: 5049–5126
- Capacity: 240 seated, 320 standing (3-car set as delivered)
- Operator: Transperth
- Depots: Nowergup, Mandurah, Claisebrook
- Lines served: High Wycombe; Ellenbrook; Mandurah; Thornlie–Cockburn; Yanchep

Specifications
- Car body construction: Stainless steel
- Train length: 72.42 m (237 ft 7 3/16 in)
- Car length: 24.21 m (79 ft 5 1/8 in) (end cars); 24 m (78 ft 8 7/8 in) (intermediate cars)
- Width: 2,910 mm (9 ft 6 9/16 in)
- Height: 3.1 m (10 ft 2 1/16 in)
- Floor height: 1,100 mm (3 ft 7 5/16 in)
- Doors: Plug-style, 2 per side of car
- Wheelbase: Bogie centres: 17.0 m (55 ft 9 5/16 in)
- Maximum speed: 130 km/h (81 mph)
- Weight: 120 t (120 long tons; 130 short tons)
- Traction system: Bombardier MITRAC IGBT–VVVF
- Traction motors: 8 × 180 kW (240 hp) 3-phase AC induction motor
- Power output: 1.44 MW (1,930 hp)
- Deceleration: 1.12 m/s^{2} (3.7 ft/s^{2}) (service); 1.35 m/s^{2} (4.4 ft/s^{2}) (emergency)
- Electric system: 25 kV 50 Hz AC (nominal) from overhead catenary
- Current collection: Pantograph
- UIC classification: Bo′Bo′+2′2′+Bo′Bo′
- Braking systems: Microprocessor controlled blended pneumatic & regenerative dynamic
- Safety system: Hitachi Rail STS L10000 ATP
- Coupling system: Scharfenberg; Dellner (2013 and 2022 refit)
- Seating: Both longitudinal and transverse seating on set 49-60. Sets 61-94 mainly transverse seating. Set 95-126 longitudinal seating only.
- Track gauge: 1,067 mm (3 ft 6 in)

The B-series trains are a class of electric multiple unit built by Downer Rail in Maryborough, Queensland for Transperth between 2004 and 2019.

== Design ==
Each set consists of three semi-permanently coupled cars designed to be used in either a three-car or six-car formation. The trains were designed to use AC motors rather than DC traction motors like the previous A-series, and to have a maximum service speed of 130 km/h (80 mph).

In each set, IGBT inverters power eight AC traction motors distributed along the three cars, providing a 66% motorised unit.

These trains are similar in design to Queensland Rail's IMU160/SMU260 EMU, V/Line VLocity DMU, and Adelaide Metro 4000 class EMU trains. The B-series trains were originally built concurrently with the V/Line VLocity.

== History ==
Perth's first electrified trains, the two-car A-series, entered service in September 1991.

In May 2002, a $437 million contract for the construction of the initial 31 three car B-series trains and the Nowergup depot was awarded to EDI Rail–Bombardier Transportation Joint Venture. These railcars were purchased to provide enough capacity for the Joondalup line extension to Clarkson, the Thornlie line spur from the Armadale line, and the Mandurah line. Of the total contract value, $24 million was for the railcar construction, $34 million was for the Nowergup depot construction, and $114 million was for the maintenance of the railcars for ten years.

The trains were specifically optimised for the higher possible speeds and greater station spacing on the newer Joondalup and Mandurah lines. Contemporaneous planning documents indicated that all-stops services on the older Fremantle, Armadale, and Midland lines would likely lead to overheating problems with the propulsion and braking systems.

Platforms at the original stations on the Yanchep line had to be lengthened to accommodate the six-car trains, as did Platform 3 at Showgrounds and both platforms at West Leederville. The Mandurah line stations, along with Butler, Clarkson, Currambine and Greenwood on the Yanchep line, and the rebuilt Kelmscott station on the Armadale line, were built with longer platforms.

In December 2006, the government signed another contract, worth $160 million, with EDI Rail–Bombardier Transportation Joint Venture for 15 more three car B-series trains to be used on the Joondalup and Mandurah lines. In 2009, the first of these additional railcars were delivered, allowing several A-series trains to be moved from the Joondalup and Mandurah lines to the other lines on the network, and for frequencies to increase on the Mandurah, Joondalup, Fremantle and Midland lines. The first entered service on 28 June 2009.

In May 2011, the government announced 15 more three car B-series trains worth $164 million would be ordered to cater for the extension of the Joondalup line to Butler, and a general increase in capacity on the network. These trains were ordered in July 2011. In August 2012, this order was increased by two, to cater for the planned Aubin Grove station, and in November 2012, this order was increased by five, to make the total order be for 22 three car trains. The final cost was $243 million. With the final delivery from that order, all trains operating on the Joondalup and Mandurah lines were B-series trains.

Funding for an additional 10 sets was announced in the May 2016 state budget with delivery planned for 2018-20. These sets would provide additional capacity on the existing network, as well as the Forrestfield–Airport Link. The B-series fleet would total 78 3-car sets. As of April 2019 all 78 3-car sets have been delivered with all 78 3-car sets in service.

== In service ==
As of 2026, B-series railcars frequently operate as three and six-car sets on the Yanchep and Mandurah lines alongside the new C series trains. Three-car B-series railcars are also the main rollingstock on the Ellenbrook and Thornlie-Cockburn lines, and the only train used on the Airport Line.

The B-series trains are cleared to operate on the Midland, Armadale, and Fremantle lines and are occasionally used on these lines alongside the older A-series, particularly when events are on at Perth Stadium. Fears of adverse impacts on the trains due to the short station spacing were found to have been unwarranted, except in extreme operating conditions such as with both high temperatures and low line voltage. However, as some stations on these lines have insufficient platform length to handle six-car sets, they are usually operated as 3-car sets. The newer Airport line services use three-car B-series sets for the same reason.

== Additional accessories ==
Since early-2016, B-series sets 115 and onwards have been fitted with USB charging ports as part of a 6-month trial.

== See also ==
- Transperth A-series train
- Transperth C-series train
- Queensland Rail Suburban multiple unit
- Queensland Rail Interurban multiple unit
- V/Line VLocity DMU
- Adelaide Metro 4000 class
