= Cycling in Perth =

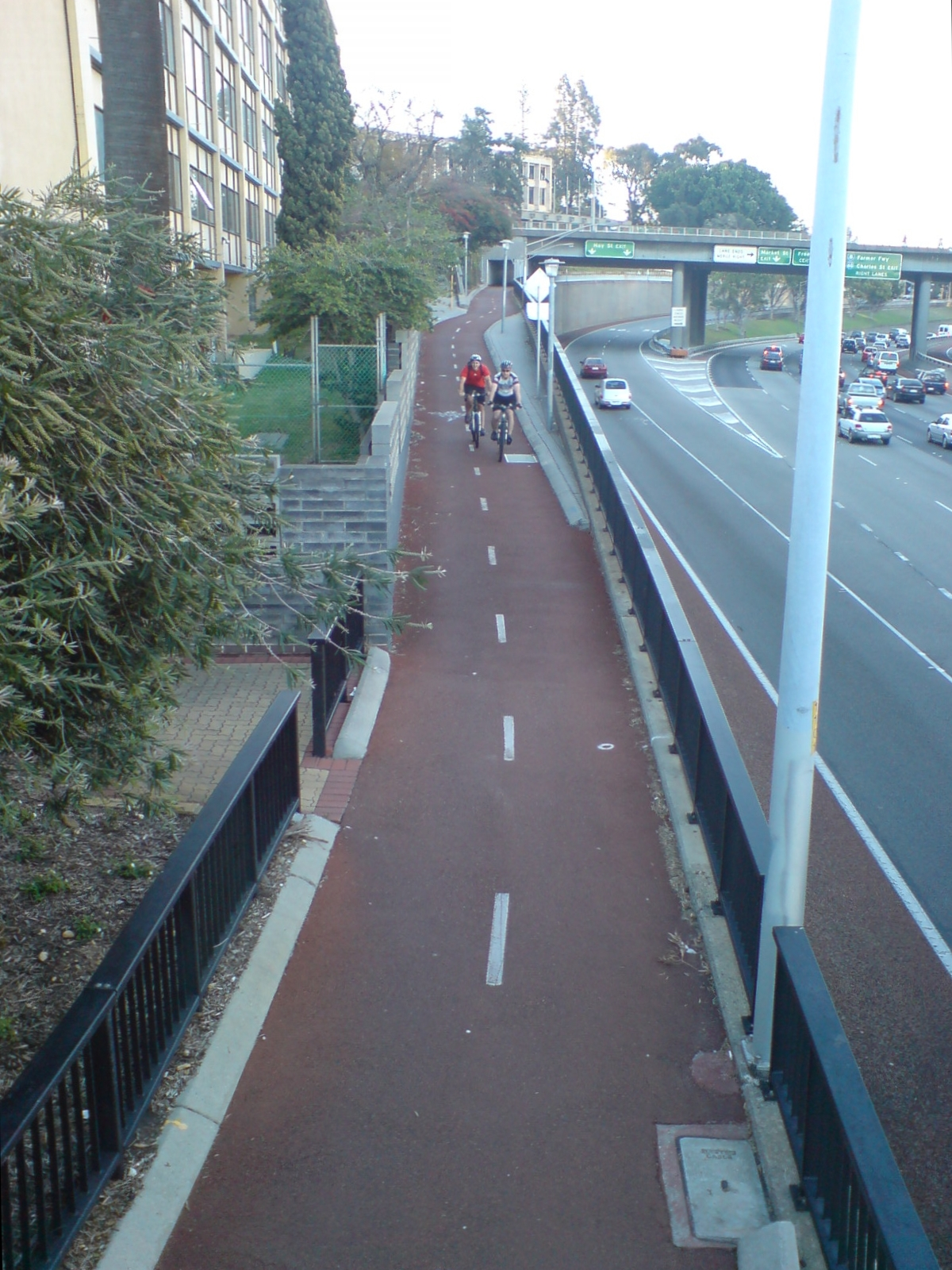
Many of Perth's cycling routes run along other transport routes like rail lines and freeways. This makes them popular for commuters.

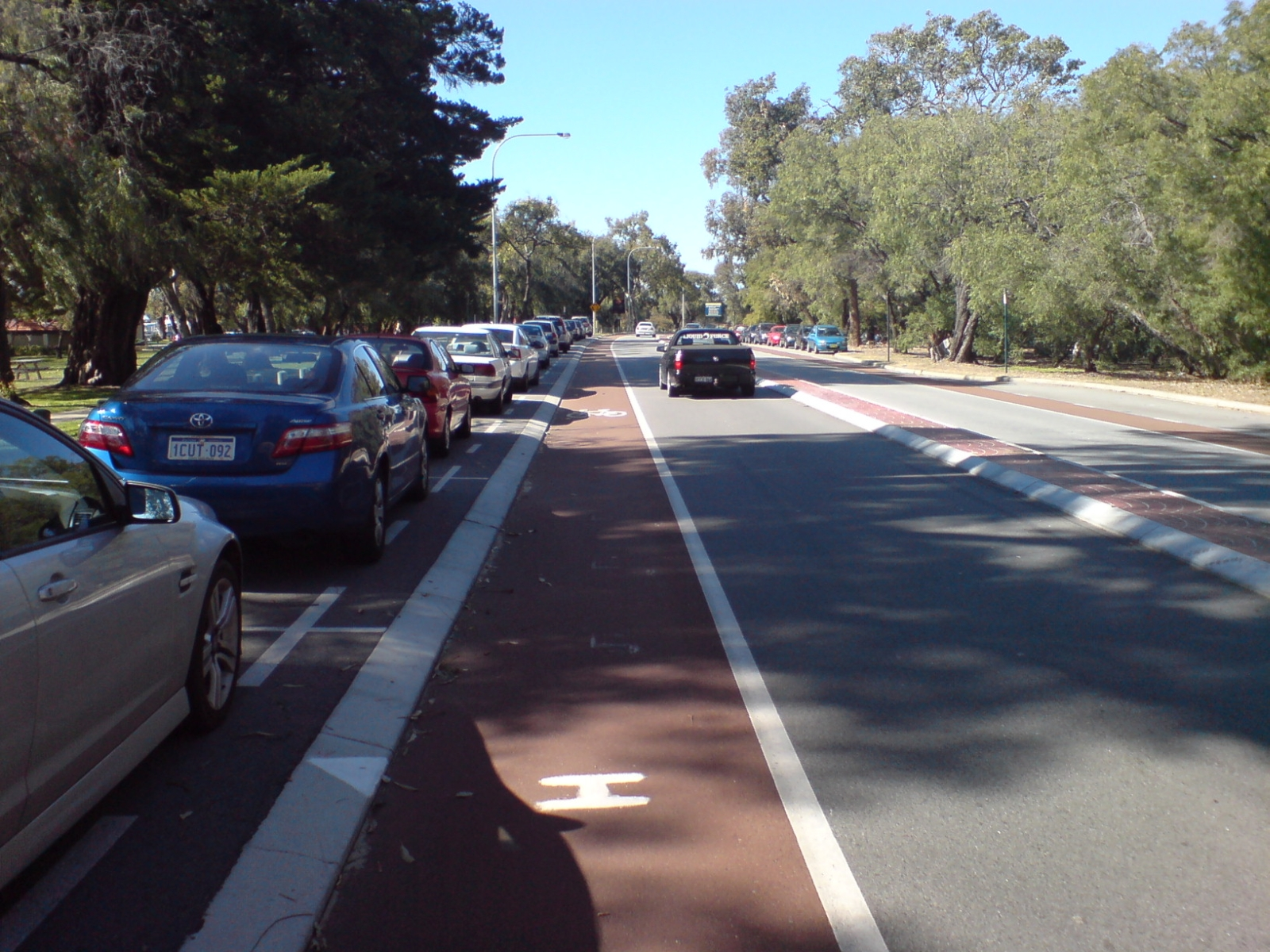
A cycle lane on a coastal route along the Swan River

Cycling in Perth, Western Australia is common on the roads and paths for recreation, commuting and sport. Between 1998 and 2009 the number of cyclists in Perth increased 450%.

== Cycling facilities in Perth ==
=== On-road bike lanes ===
Bike lanes exist on some of Perth's major roads while many others have parallel shared paths.

=== Bike routes and recreational paths ===
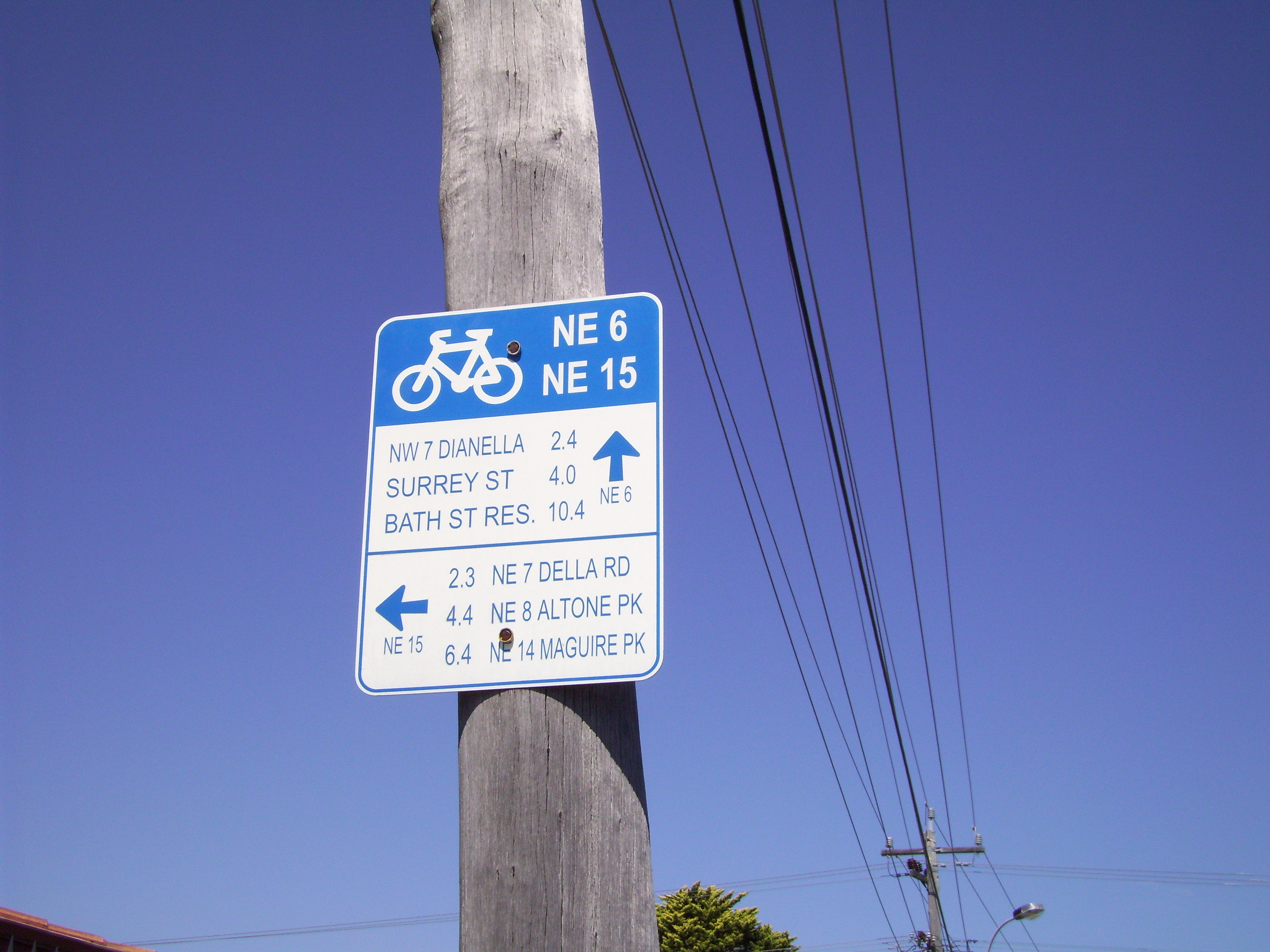
Perth Bicycle Network (PBN) guidance sign showing routes NE6 and NE15

There are some bike routes and recreational paths in Perth that are popular for cycling for the pleasure of a day or evening out of doors or for light exercise, or as a way of getting around. Most are interrupted by road crossings, road works, slow points or just end abruptly. Many new developments have caused disconnection in what was a previously continuous shared paths such as Elizabeth Quay, the new Scarborough Beach redevelopment and the Reid Highway / Mitchell Freeway overpass. Nearly all of the paths are "shared paths" – shared by cyclists, pedestrians and other users. Some of the major routes include:

- Perth and Kings Park by bike
- Parts of the Swan and Canning rivers (previously a 50 km circuit mainly via shared paths interrupted by some pedestrian only bridges and Elizabeth Quay)
- ride along the Sunset Coast (Two separate routes from Fremantle to South of Scarborough Beach and from North of Trigg Beach to Burns Beach) that follows the coast. Wonderful views of the Indian Ocean with many interesting sites and beaches to visit along the way.
- Burswood Park Trail: A very scenic 3.5 km route close to the Perth CBD that takes in Burswood Park and the Swan River foreshore.
- Ride through the hills. Three separate rides of varying distances through the Darling Range hills situated on the outskirts of Perth. Highlights include forests, waterfalls, orchards and vineyards.
- Choose from a variety of routes through the Swan Valley area on the outskirts of Perth that is famous for its wineries, restaurants and craft industry.
- Ride from Armadale to Perth. A 50 km scenic riding route via mainly shared paths from the historic of town of Armadale, along the picturesque Canning River catchment, to Perth.
- Perth to Fremantle bike route. A 20 km bike route from Perth to the port city of Fremantle.
- Perth to Midland bike route. A 16 km bike route from Perth to the historic locality of Midland.
- Longer, near-continuous paths exist from Perth to Muchea in the north (along Tonkin Highway) and to Mandurah/South Yunderup in the south along the Kwinana Freeway.

Also Rottnest Island, 19 km off the coast of Fremantle, is ideal to explore by bicycle because private vehicles are not permitted on its roads.

=== Rail trails and long-distance routes ===
There are also rail trails and long-distance trails, such as the existing Railway Reserve Heritage Trail, and the Munda Biddi Trail, which runs 1,000 kilometres from Mundaring in the Perth Hills to Albany on the state's south coast.

=== Principal Shared Paths ===
The Perth Principal Shared Path (PSP) network is a web of off-road paths that form the backbone of the Perth Bicycle Network. PSPs are shared pedestrian and bicycle paths that primarily follow freeway and rail corridors, they have a high degree of separation from traffic utilising bridges and tunnels to bypass intersections. The PSP network is constructed according to the Western Australian Department of Main Roads Standards and Guidelines for Shared Paths.

The Western Australian Government has a policy of including the construction of Principal Shared Paths when building major road projects such as the Gateway WA Project and the Forrest Highway. The rollout of PSP routes along railway corridors is largely complete within 10 km of the Perth Central Business District however work continues on the construction of PSP paths adjacent to the rest of the radial Perth rail network.

Those who do not wish to ride the whole way to their destination can mix their commute with public transport by park and riding or by taking their bike with them on the train except during main commuting times mornings and evenings where bikes are prohibited on trains.

=== Park and ride ===
Commuting is made easier by park and ride facilities at Perth train stations. There are different types of bicycle parking. A guide published by Transperth outlines the bicycle facilities available at each Perth train station as well as the rules and regulations around bicycles and public transport.

Transperth's bike shelters are secure sheds for locking your bicycle in at Perth train stations, they can be accessed by anyone who registers their Smartrider for access on the Transperth website. Users may register for access to a maximum of two bike shelters on the Transperth network at any one time, users can access the bike shelter 24 hours a day.

As of October 2009 there are approximately 450 bike lockers at suburban railway stations and major bus stations throughout the metropolitan area although no more than 3 at any one location. Where available lockers have been positioned in areas monitored by surveillance (closed circuit TV). Users are required to provide their own lock (D lock or padlock) and observe the Conditions of Use that are displayed on alternate doors of each locker set. It is recommended that a top quality padlock that has a hardened steel body and shank be used for security purposes.

Over 200 bike racks are provided at suburban railway stations and major bus stations in the Perth metropolitan area. These facilities are usually located on or near platforms for convenience and security purposes.

=== Bikes on public transport ===
Bikes are permitted on all Transperth train services except for city-bound morning peak (weekdays 7.00am to 9.00am) services and trains heading out of the city in the afternoon peak (weekdays 4.30pm to 6.30pm). Bikes cannot depart or pass through Perth, Perth Underground or Elizabeth Quay stations in any direction during these periods – Transperth asks that cyclist get off, ride through the city, then re-board outside of these stations.

Folding bicycles are however permitted in peak times as long as they are in a carry bag, exceed no more than 79 cm x 59 cm x 36 cm in size, and are kept out of the aisles.

Bikes (excluding folding bicycles) are not allowed on any Transperth bus services.

== Advocacy and promotion ==
There are many cycling-related recreational, social and charity events every year in Perth as well as events to promote cycling in general, such as Ride to Work day and the Cycle Instead Challenge. This is based on the Cycle Instead social marketing campaign, coordinated by the WA Department of Transport, which was established in October 1999.

== Cycling events ==
As with other cities in Australia road cycling has become a popular pastime and sport. The organization Cycling Western Australia organises, facilitates and promotes many road racing events, including Western Australia's premier road cycling event, the Tour de Perth. Perth also hosts the premier track cycling event called Perth International Track Cycling Grand Prix. There are also many mountain bike events.
