= Currambine railway station =

Railway station in Perth, Western Australia

Currambine
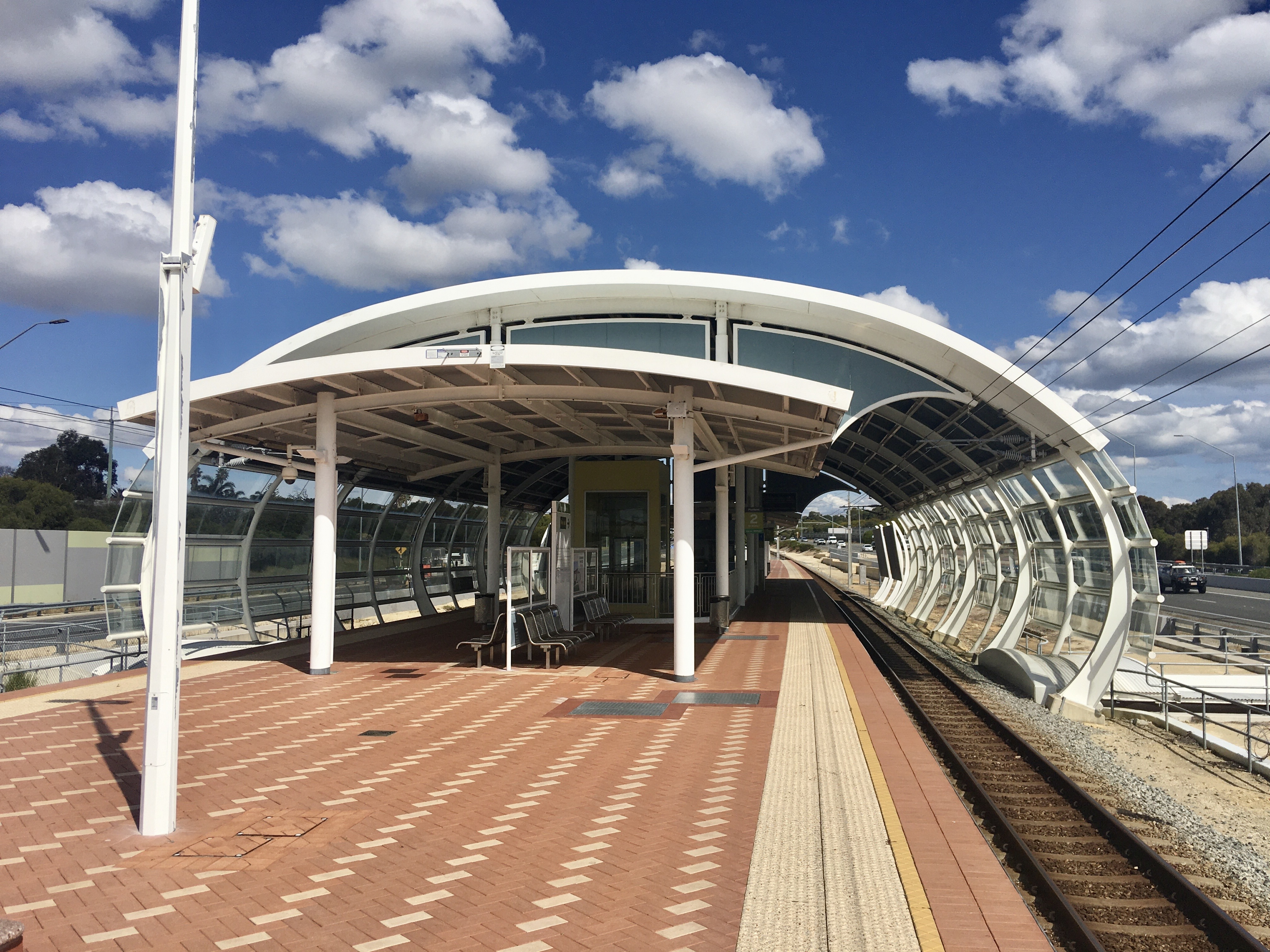
- Southbound view from Platform 1, December 2021

General information
- Location: Mitchell Freeway, Currambine / Joondalup; Western Australia; Australia
- Coordinates: 31°43′30″S 115°45′02″E
- Owner: Public Transport Authority
- Operator: Public Transport Authority
- Line: Yanchep line
- Distance: 29.2 km (18.1 mi) from Perth Underground
- Platforms: 1 island platform with 2 platform edges
- Tracks: 2

Construction
- Parking: 1,002
- Accessible: Yes

Other information
- Fare zone: 4

History
- Opened: 8 August 1993
- Rebuilt: 4 October 2004

Passengers
- March 2018: 2,100 per day

Services
Preceding station	Transperth	Following station
Joondalup towards Elizabeth Quay via Perth Underground	Yanchep line All	Clarkson towards Yanchep
Joondalup towards Elizabeth Quay via Perth Underground	Yanchep line K	Clarkson Terminus
Location
- Location of Currambine station

Currambine railway station is a suburban rail station on the border of Currambine and Joondalup, north of Perth, Western Australia. It is on the Yanchep line, which is part of the Transperth network. Located in the median of the Mitchell Freeway, the station consists of an island platform connected to the east and west by an underpass.

Constructed by Doubikin Constructions Pty Ltd at a cost of $2.8 million, Currambine station opened on 8 August 1993 as the final station from the original plan for the Joondalup line. The station was originally built on the western side of the Mitchell Freeway reserve to limit the distance between the car park and platform. It was decided to relocate the station 60 metres (200 ft) to the east during the extension of the Joondalup line (now known as the Yanchep line) to Clarkson, so that the station would be in the median of the Mitchell Freeway. This was done to reduce the noise and vibration impact on houses near the railway line and for consistency with the rest of the Yanchep and Mandurah lines. Constructed by John Holland at a cost of $3.2 million, the relocated station opened on 4 October 2004.

Currambine station is 29.2 kilometres (18.1 mi) from Perth Underground station, with train journeys there taking 29 minutes. Train headways reach as low as five minutes during peak hour, with off-peak services at 15-minute headways.

== Description ==
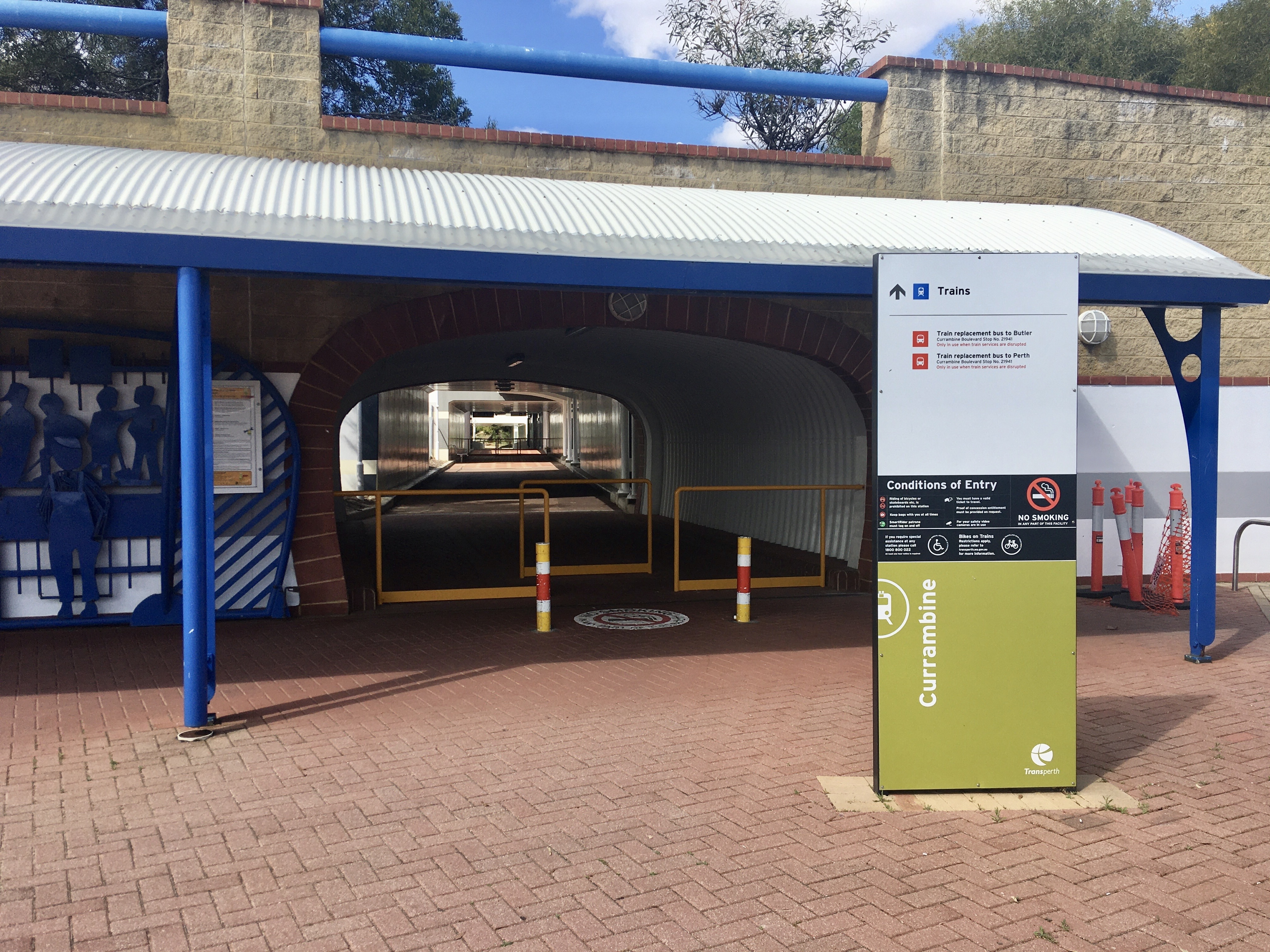
Currambine station underpass western entrance

Currambine station is in the median of the Mitchell Freeway along the Yanchep line. It is owned by the Public Transport Authority (PTA), a state government agency, and is part of the Transperth system. The station is on the border of Currambine and Joondalup, north of Perth, Western Australia. It is 29.2 kilometres (18.1 mi), or a 29-minute train journey, to Perth Underground station, placing the station in fare zone four. The next station to the north is Clarkson station and the next station to the south is Joondalup station.

The station consists of two platform faces on a single island platform. The platform is 150-metre (490 ft) long, or long enough for a Transperth six-car train – the longest trains used on the network. Stairs and a lift link the platform to a pedestrian underpass, which goes east and west of the station. On the western side is a 1,002-bay car park, a bike shelter, a motorbike shelter, and some toilets. Currambine is listed as an independent access station on the Transperth website as the platform can be accessed using lifts, the platform gap is small, and tactile paving is in place.

=== Public art ===
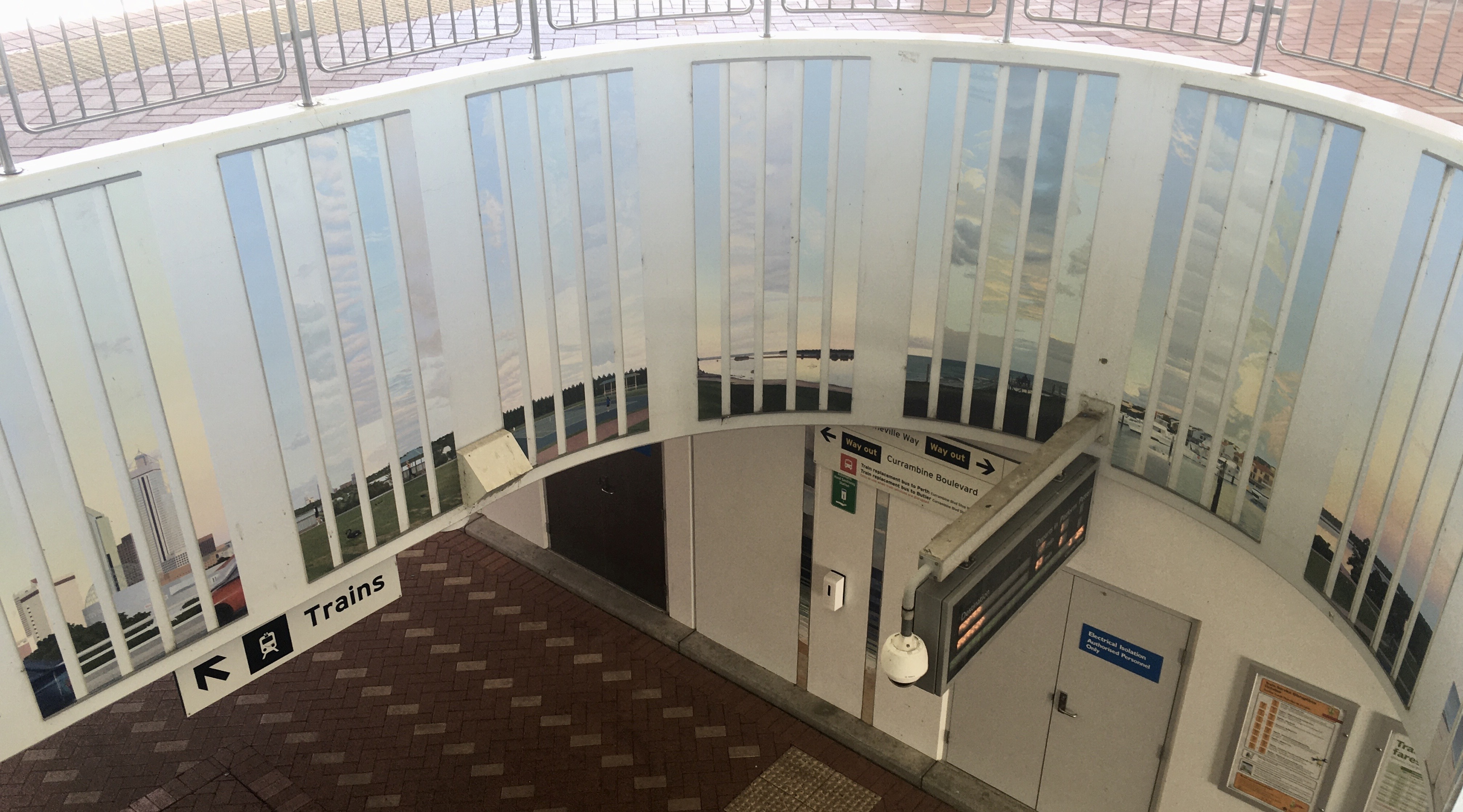
10 Stations, 10 Weeks, 5.24pm, by Lyn Merrington

Along the top part of the walls of the stairwell is 10 Stations, 10 Weeks, 5.24pm, by Lyn Merrington. It consists of vertical strips of painted images of landscapes near each station from Perth to Clarkson along the Yanchep line.

== History ==
Currambine station was part of the 1989 Northern Suburbs Transit System Master Plan. It called for a station at Burns Beach Road to be completed by the end of 1993, a year later than the rest of the line. The station was to be on the western side of the future Mitchell Freeway alignment, the only station on the line to be so, to reduce the "transfer penalty". It was designed as one of three non-bus interchange stations, with nearby buses going to Joondalup station instead. It was planned instead for primarily park and ride, to supplement Joondalup station's lack of parking. The contract for the construction of Currambine station, worth $2.8 million, was awarded to Doubikin Constructions Pty Ltd in 1992. As the last station on the line, there was also a train storage and cleaning facility built there as well. The station was opened on 8 August 1993 by Cheryl Edwardes, the member for Kingsley. This marked the completion of the Joondalup line for the time being.

During planning for an extension of the line to Clarkson, it was decided to run the railway down the middle of the future Mitchell Freeway reserve. This was done to reduce the noise and vibration impact of the railway on nearby housing as well as for consistency with the rest of the Joondalup line and the yet-to-be-built Mandurah line. It was also found that the "transfer penalty" was not very significant, as the two most heavily used stations on the line – Warwick and Whitfords – had over 60% of passengers come via driving or walking, necessitating crossing over a bridge across the freeway. As a result, it was required that Currambine station be relocated 60 metres (200 ft) east.

A $3.2 million contract for the new station's construction was awarded to John Holland in March 2002. The relocated station opened on 4 October 2004, as did the extension to Clarkson. In celebration of the opening, travel on Transperth train services was free that day, costing the state $50,000.

An extension of the Mitchell Freeway to Burns Beach Road commenced in January 2006, and was opened in November 2008, surrounding the station with freeway lanes.

== Services ==
Currambine station is served by Yanchep line trains operated by the PTA. The line goes between Yanchep station and Elizabeth Quay station in the Perth central business district, continuing south from there as the Mandurah line.

During the middle of peak hour, trains stop at Currambine station every 10 minutes. At the start of peak hour, southbound trains stop at the station approximately every 5 minutes, with half of those services commencing at Clarkson station after exiting the Nowergup railway depot. At the end of peak hour, northbound trains stop at the station approximately every 5 minutes, with half of those services terminating at Clarkson station to enter the Nowergup railway depot. Services that terminate or start at Clarkson station are part of the K stopping pattern. During weekdays between peak hours, on weekends and public holidays, trains stop at Currambine station every 15 minutes. At night, trains are half-hourly or hourly. In the 2013–14 financial year, Currambine station had 617,278 people board, the third least of the stations on the Joondalup line. In March 2018, Currambine station had approximately 2,100 boardings per weekday, making it the joint least busiest station on the Yanchep line, alongside Edgewater.

== Platforms ==
Currambine platform arrangement
Stop ID	Platform	Line	Service Pattern	Destination	Via	Notes
99881	1	Yanchep line	All stations, K	Elizabeth Quay	Perth Underground	
99882	2	Yanchep line	All stations	Yanchep		
99882	2	Yanchep line	K	Clarkson		
