= Geoffrey Drake-Brockman (artist) =

Australian artist

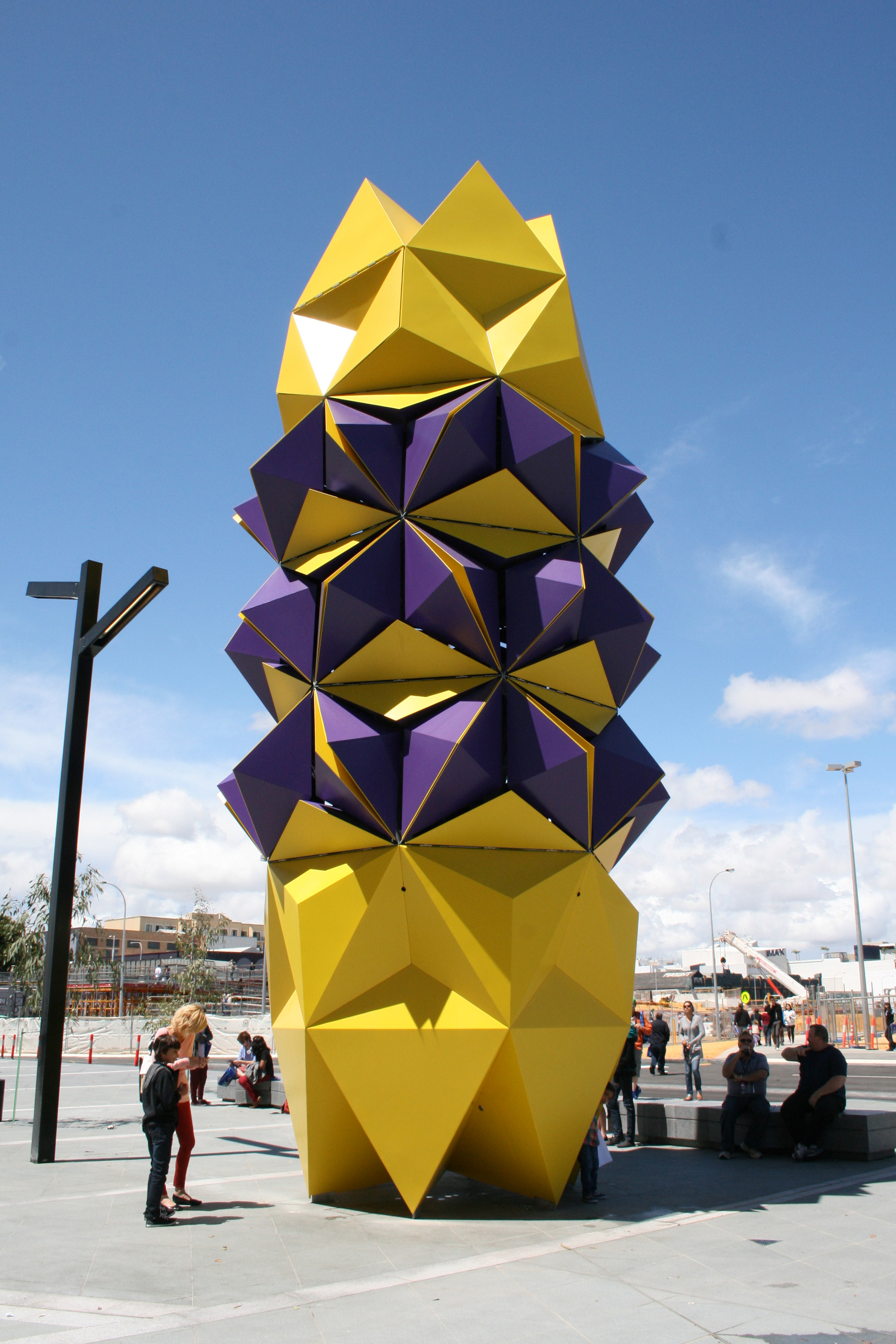
"Totem" (2012), located outside Perth Arena

Geoffrey Drake-Brockman (born 1964) is an Australian artist known for incorporating robotics and lasers into his work. He was born in Woomera, South Australia. He currently lives and works in Perth, Western Australia.

Notable works include "Floribots", (128 computer-controlled robot origami flowers arranged in a grid a sculpture that won the Macquarie Bank People's Choice Award when exhibited at the National Gallery of Australia)) and "Totem", (a 10.5-metre-tall (34 ft) installation outside Perth Arena that has moving panels that open and close like flower petals when people walk past.)

In March 2013 he took to Indiegogo to raise funds to complete four life size Robot Ballerinas, otherwise known as the "Coppelia Project".
