= Elizabeth Quay railway station =

Railway station in Perth, Western Australia

Elizabeth Quay
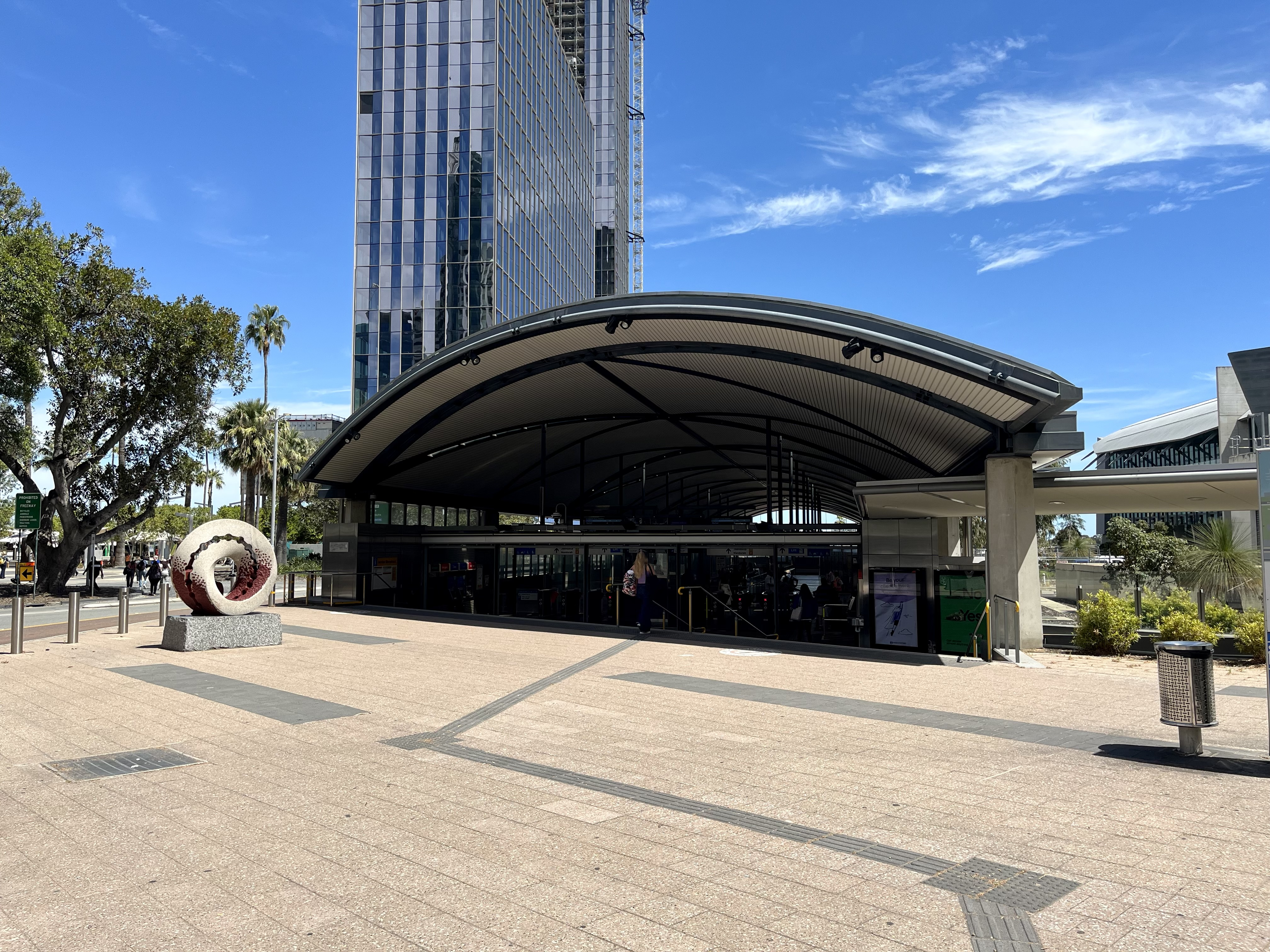
- Main station entrance and building, November 2023

General information
- Location: Mounts Bay Road & William Street, Perth; Western Australia; Australia
- Coordinates: 31°57′25″S 115°51′19″E
- Owner: Public Transport Authority
- Operator: Transperth Train Operations
- Lines: Yanchep line; Mandurah line
- Distance: 0.6 kilometres (0 mi) from Perth Underground
- Platforms: 1 island platform with 2 platform edges
- Tracks: 2
- Connections: Elizabeth Quay bus station; Elizabeth Quay Jetty

Construction
- Structure type: Underground
- Accessible: Yes

Other information
- Fare zone: 1/FTZ

History
- Opened: 15 October 2007
- Former names: Esplanade (2007–2016)

Passengers
- October 2017: 11,860 per day

Services
Preceding station	Transperth	Following station
through to Mandurah line	Yanchep line All, K, W	Perth Underground towards Whitfords, Clarkson or Yanchep
Canning Bridge towards Cockburn Central or Mandurah	Mandurah line All, W	Perth Underground Terminus
Location
- Location of Elizabeth Quay station

Elizabeth Quay railway station, also known as Esplanade station prior to 2016, is an underground railway station on the southern side of the Perth central business district in Western Australia.

== Description ==
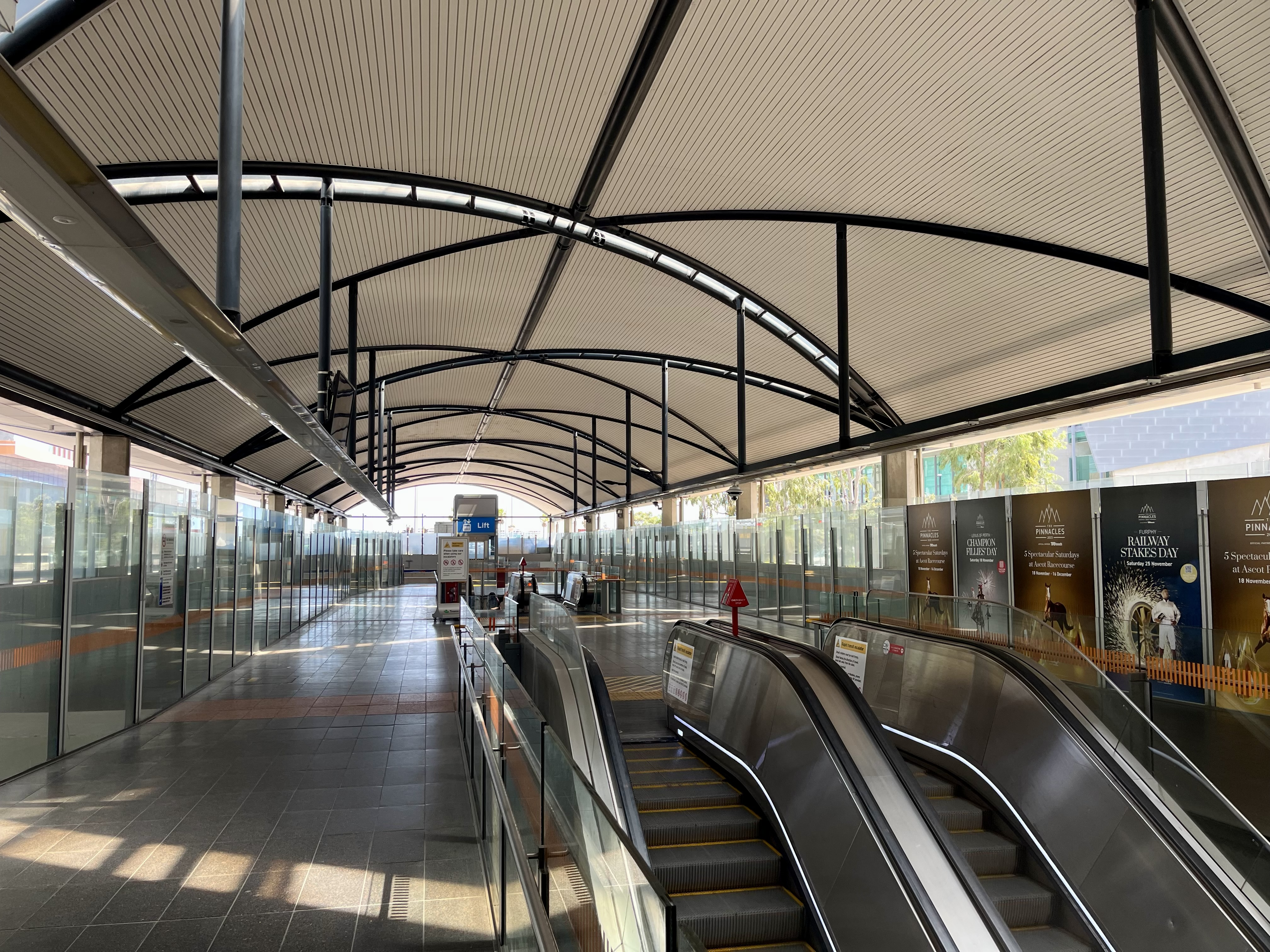
Station concourse pictured in November 2023

Elizabeth Quay station is situated along the William Street tunnel. It is surrounded by Mounts Bay Road to the north, William Street to the east, and Elizabeth Quay bus station to the west. The adjacent stations are Perth Underground station to the north and Canning Bridge station to the south. The station is owned by the Public Transport Authority.

Elizabeth Quay station has one island platform with two platform faces. The platform is connected to the ground-level concourse by stairs, escalators and a lift. Initially four escalators were planned to be installed, but that was reduced to two to cut costs, with there being room to install more later. There is one entrance to the station: on the northern side. The station is fully accessible. The station initially opened without toilets due to there being toilets at the Esplanade Busport, but by July 2008, public toilets were built at the station due to public demand.

=== Artwork ===
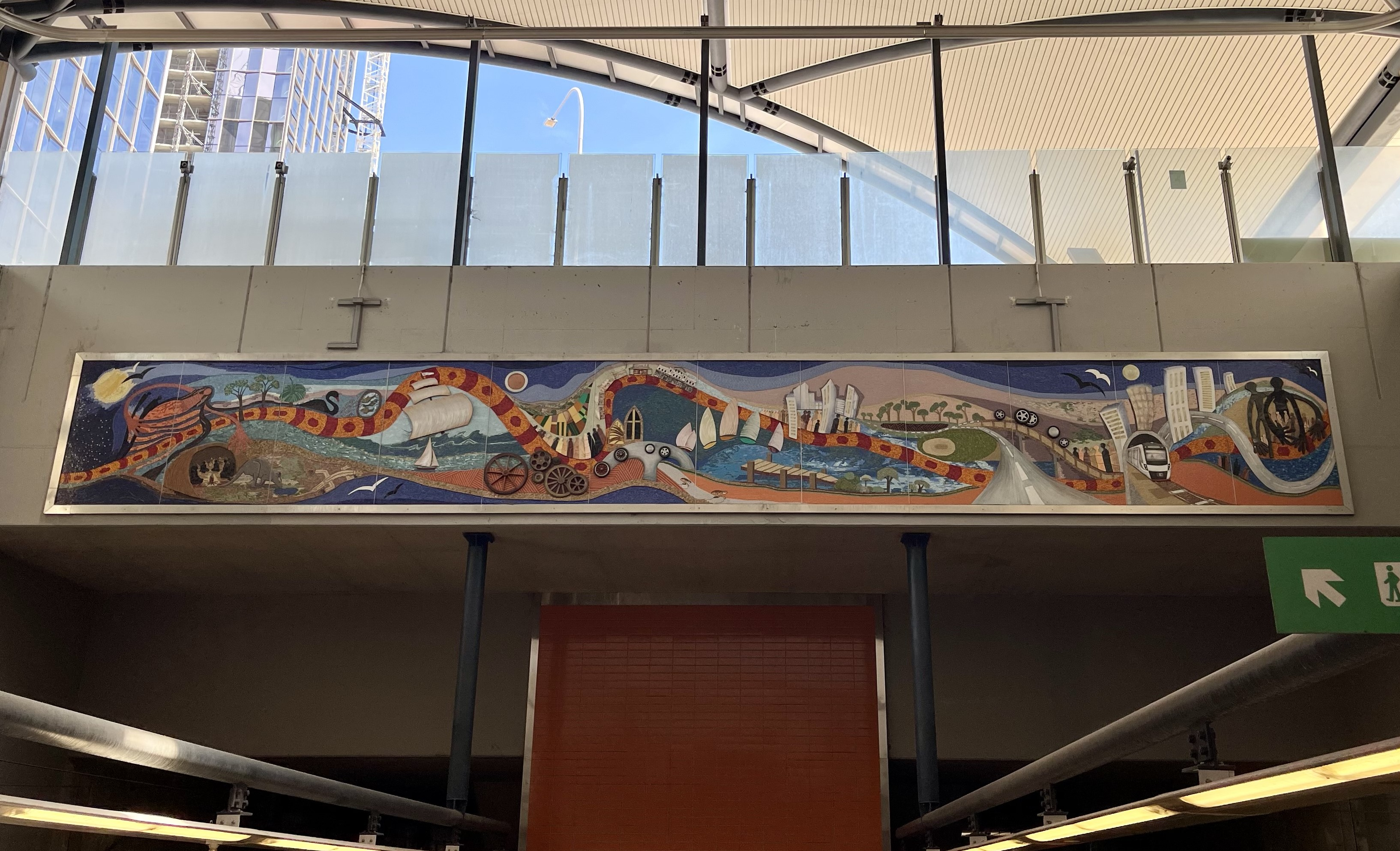
Journey as One, by Norma MacDonald, Les MacDonald and Robyn Templeton, on the station's northern interior wall

There are two pieces of public art at Elizabeth Quay station: Journey as One, by Norma MacDonald, Les MacDonald and Robyn Templeton, and Journey, by The Glow Studio (Jude Bunn). Journey as One is a mosaic made of glass, glass mosaics, ceramic, ceramic tiles, natural stone and aluminium, on the station's southern interior wall. It consists of 12 side-by-side segments which are each 1.2 metres (3 ft 11 in) wide and 1.8 metres (5 ft 11 in) high, and "presents a continuous narrative depicting the past, present and future association of the Nyoongar people with the [...] station site. Journey is a plaque which contains abstract imagery relating to the Mandurah line, including the names of stations on the line. During the opening on 23 December 2007, a circular icon was placed on the plaque which commemorates the opening. A similar plaque is located at Mandurah station on the other end of the line.

== History ==
=== Planning ===
Upon opening on 20 December 1992, Yanchep line (then Joondalup line) trains stopped at the above-ground Perth station and continued east of there as the Armadale line. The first South West Metropolitan Railway Master Plan, published in 1999, detailed the route of the future Mandurah line. It would branch off the Armadale line at Kenwick, requiring no new stations in the Perth central business district (CBD). Following the election of the Labor Party to power in the 2001 state election, the route of the Mandurah line was changed. A new master plan was released, outlining the new and more direct route, which travels in a tunnel under the Perth CBD before surfacing and running down the median of the Kwinana Freeway from Perth to Kwinana. The new route had two new stations within the Perth CBD: Perth Underground station, which was known during construction as William Street station, and Elizabeth Quay station, which was known prior to 2016 as Esplanade station, after the nearby road named The Esplanade and the Esplanade Reserve. Esplanade station had a predicted number of weekday boardings of 10,000.

=== Construction ===
New MetroRail was formed in March 2003 to manage the construction of the Mandurah line, among other rail projects in Perth.

The construction of the Mandurah line, also known as the Southern Suburbs Railway, was divided into eight main packages. The William Street tunnel was part of Package F, which consisted of 700 metres (2,300 ft) of bored tunnels, 600 metres (2,000 ft) of cut-and-cover tunnels, the construction of Perth Underground and Esplanade stations, the connection of the railway to the rest of the network west of Perth station, and construction of tracks and overhead wiring within the tunnels. This was also known as the City Project. Expressions of interest for the Package F contract were called for in March 2003. Five consortia submitted expressions of interest by May 2003. The contract for the design and construction of Package F was awarded to a joint venture between Leighton Contractors and Kumagai Gumi in February 2004 at a cost of A$324.5 million. Leighton Kumagai appointed architecture firm Hassell to design the two stations.

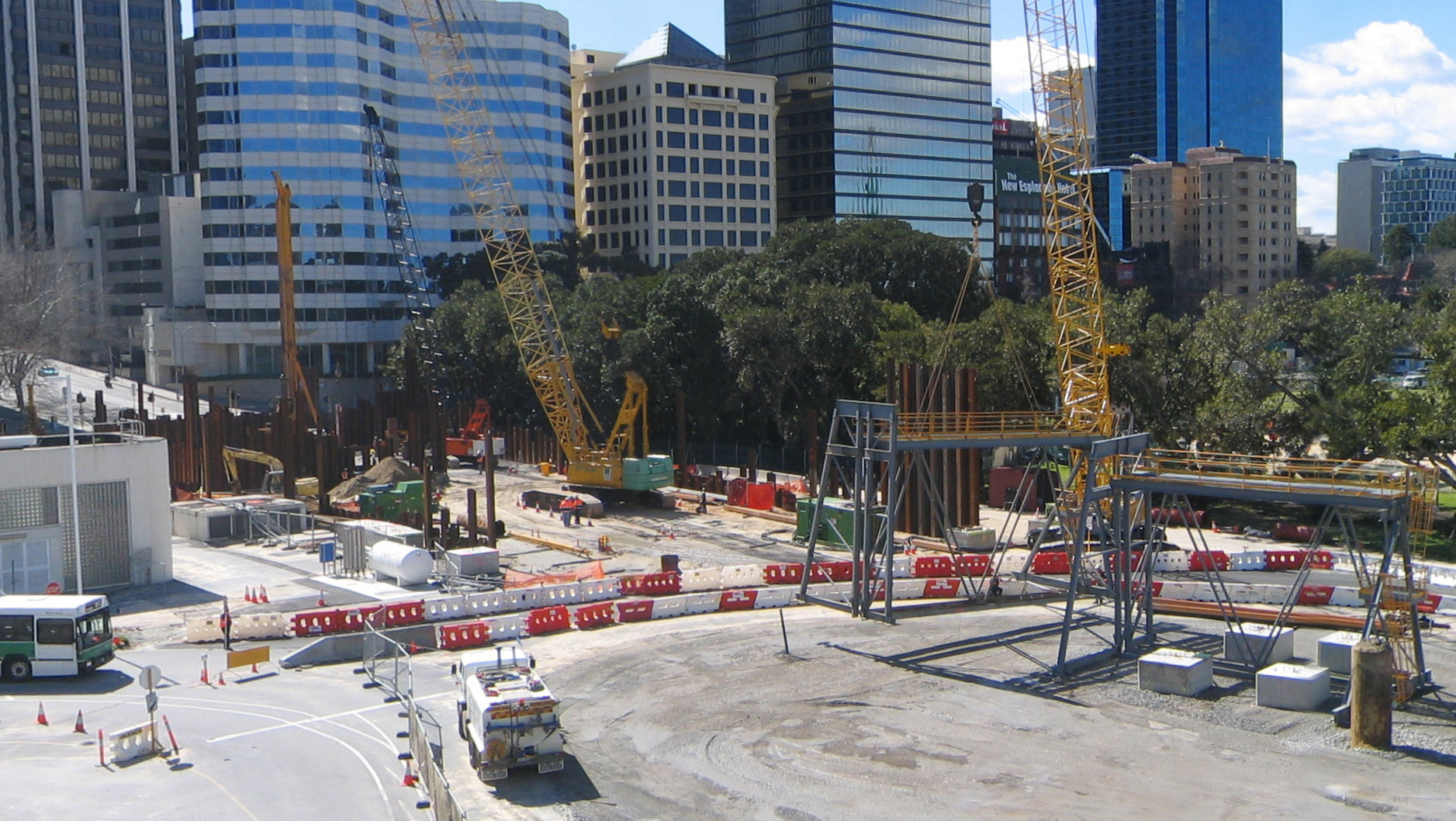
Construction in August 2004. Sheet piles are being installed.

The first plan for Esplanade station was voted down by the Perth City Council in April 2004, with councillors saying it did not blend in with the Perth Convention and Exhibition Centre, did not enhance the foreshore, that pedestrian access and weather protection were poor. After revisions, the station was approved by the council in July 2004.

The construction site for Esplanade station was established in May 2004. The portion of William Street directly next to Esplanade station was closed during the station's construction. Esplanade station lies on land reclaimed from the Swan River, resulting a challenging environment for digging and tunnelling. Before the station could be constructed, a large water main that passed directly through the future station box, 1-metre (3 ft 3 in) in diameter, had to be diverted. The water main carried much of the CBD's water supply, so the diversion took place over an Easter long weekend, when demand for water was low. By July 2004, sheet piling to form the walls of the station box was underway. This was one of the largest uses of sheet piles in Australia as of the time of construction.

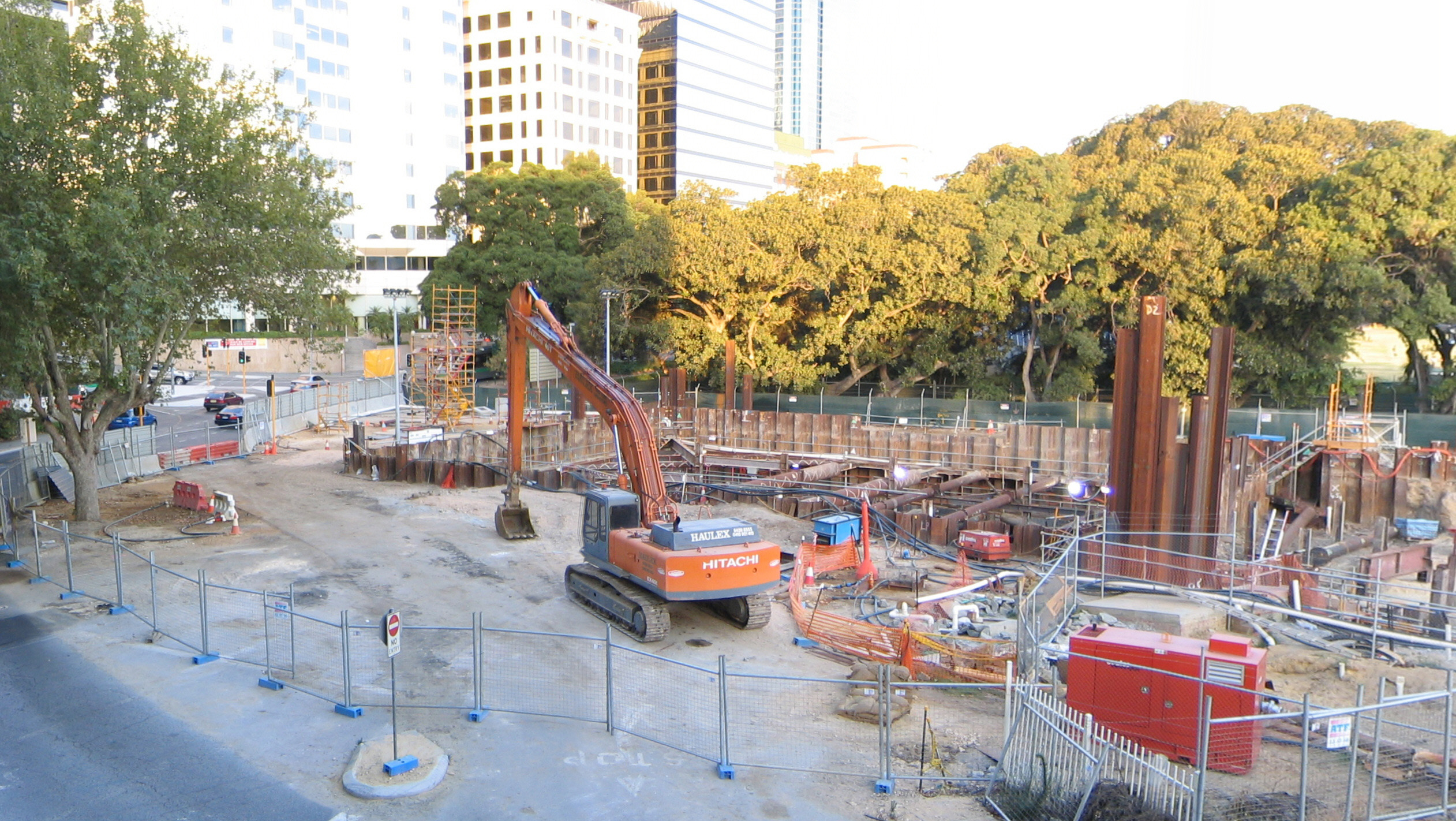
Construction in February 2005. Excavation of the station box has begun.

On 13 March 2005, the tunnel boring machine (TBM) arrived on site. The two bored tunnels between Esplanade station and the Roe Street dive structure were to be dug by the single TBM, which was to be dismantled and transported back to Esplanade station once the first tunnel had been completed. On 14 August, it was craned into the Esplanade station box, and on 25 October, the TBM began tunnelling north towards Perth Underground station and the Roe Street dive structure. The first tunnel was completed in June 2006 when the TBM reached the dive structure next to Roe Street. Tunnelling was completed on 24 October 2006 when the TBM reached the Roe Street dive structure for the second time. By the end of 2006, most structural work had been completed and architectural finishes and electrical and mechanical fit-out had commenced.

In April 2005, Minister for Planning and Infrastructure Alannah MacTiernan announced that the New MetroRail project completion date had been delayed from December 2006 to April 2007. In April 2006, she announced that the project's opening date had been delayed to July 2007. In April 2007, MacTiernan revealed another delay, this time with the likely opening date being October 2007.

The first test train ran through the tunnels on 11 August 2007. The City Project achieved practical completion in September 2007, and was handed over from the contractor to the PTA on 10 September. From 7 October to 14 October 2007, the Fremantle and Joondalup lines were shut down to connect the tunnel tracks to the rest of the network. From 15 October, Joondalup line services began running via Perth Underground and Esplanade station, marking the opening of those stations to passenger service. Mandurah line services south of Esplanade station commenced on 23 December 2007.

=== Rename ===
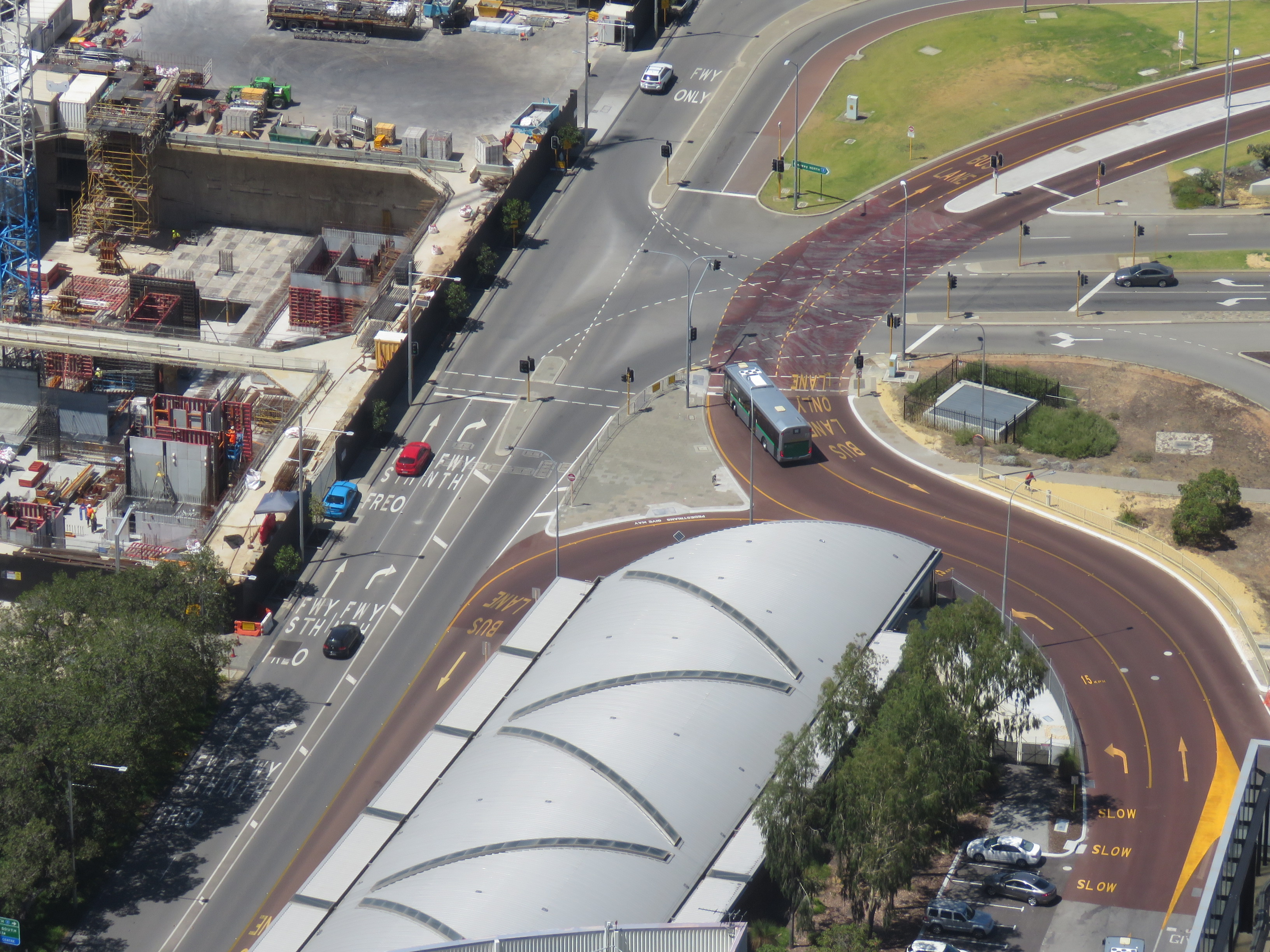
Southern end of the Elizabeth Quay station roof pictured in January 2021 from Central Park. Bus lanes for the Elizabeth Quay bus station are visible as well.

Esplanade station was renamed Elizabeth Quay station on 31 January 2016, two days after the opening of the nearby Elizabeth Quay inlet, which replaced the Esplanade Reserve. Esplanade bus station was renamed Elizabeth Quay bus station as well, and the Elizabeth Quay Jetty opened, replacing the Barrack Street Jetty. The cost of the renaming was estimated to be $700,000, which was criticised by the state opposition as a waste of money. Planning Minister John Day said the renaming was done to "make the precinct easily identifiable for locals and visitors", and that "it makes sense to have a consistent precinct, similar to Sydney's Circular Quay and the nearby train station."

=== Other ===
The escalators at Elizabeth Quay station, which were manufactured by Otis Worldwide, have had severe reliability issues since the station opened. In 2020, the escalators were replaced, seven years before the end of their expected life.

== Services ==
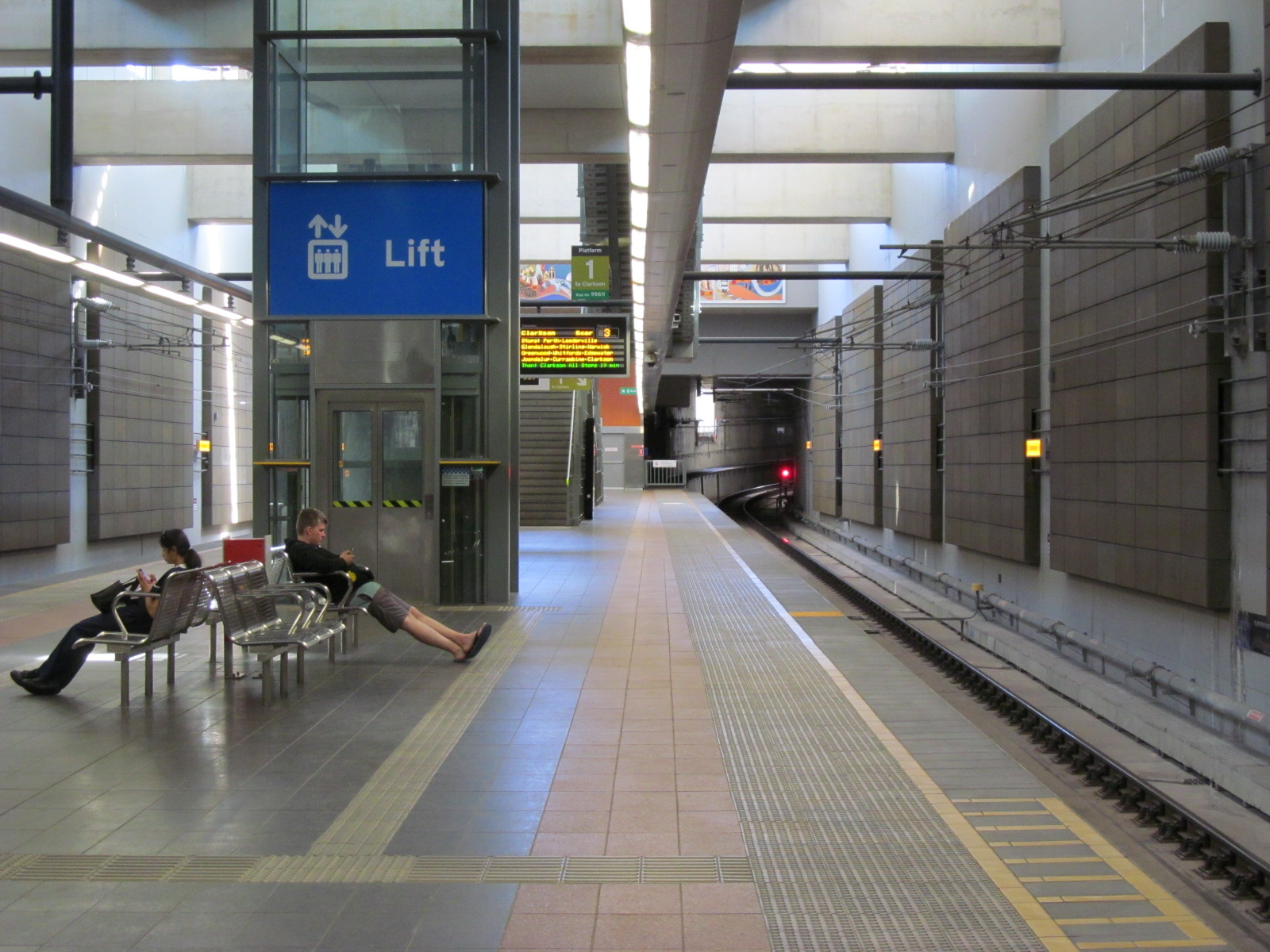
Platforms pictured in January 2014

Elizabeth Quay station is served by Transperth Yanchep line and Mandurah line services, which are operated by the PTA via its Transperth Train Operations division. The Yanchep and Mandurah lines form one continuous line. The service between Elizabeth Quay and Perth Underground stations is considered part of the Joondalup and Mandurah lines simultaneously. South of Elizabeth Quay station are Mandurah line services and north of Perth Underground station are Yanchep line services.

Yanchep and Mandurah line trains run at a five-minute frequency during peak hour and a fifteen-minute frequency outside peak and on weekends and public holidays. At night, trains are half-hourly or hourly. The earliest trains depart at 5:32 am on weekdays and Saturdays and 7:19 am on Sundays. The latest trains depart at 12:17 am on weeknights and 2:17 am on weekend nights.

In the 2013–14 financial year, the station had 3,311,932 boardings. On an average weekday in October 2017, Elizabeth Quay station had 11,860 boardings.

=== Platforms ===
Elizabeth Quay platform arrangement
Stop ID	Platform	Line	Service Pattern	Destination	Via	Notes
99611	1	Mandurah line	All stations, W	Perth		Between Perth Underground and Elizabeth Quay train services are simultaneously part of both the Mandurah and Yanchep lines
99611	1	Yanchep line	All stations	Yanchep	Perth Underground	Between Perth Underground and Elizabeth Quay train services are simultaneously part of both the Mandurah and Yanchep lines
99611	1	Yanchep line	K	Clarkson	Perth Underground	Between Perth Underground and Elizabeth Quay train services are simultaneously part of both the Mandurah and Yanchep lines
99611	1	Yanchep line	W	Whitfords	Perth Underground	Between Perth Underground and Elizabeth Quay train services are simultaneously part of both the Mandurah and Yanchep lines
99612	2	Mandurah line	All stations	Mandurah	Murdoch	Yanchep line services through run with Mandurah line services
99612	2	Mandurah line	W	Cockburn	Murdoch	Yanchep line services through run with Mandurah line services
99612	2	Yanchep line	All stations, K, W	Terminus		Yanchep line services through run with Mandurah line services
