= Alkimos College =

School in Alkimos, Western Australia

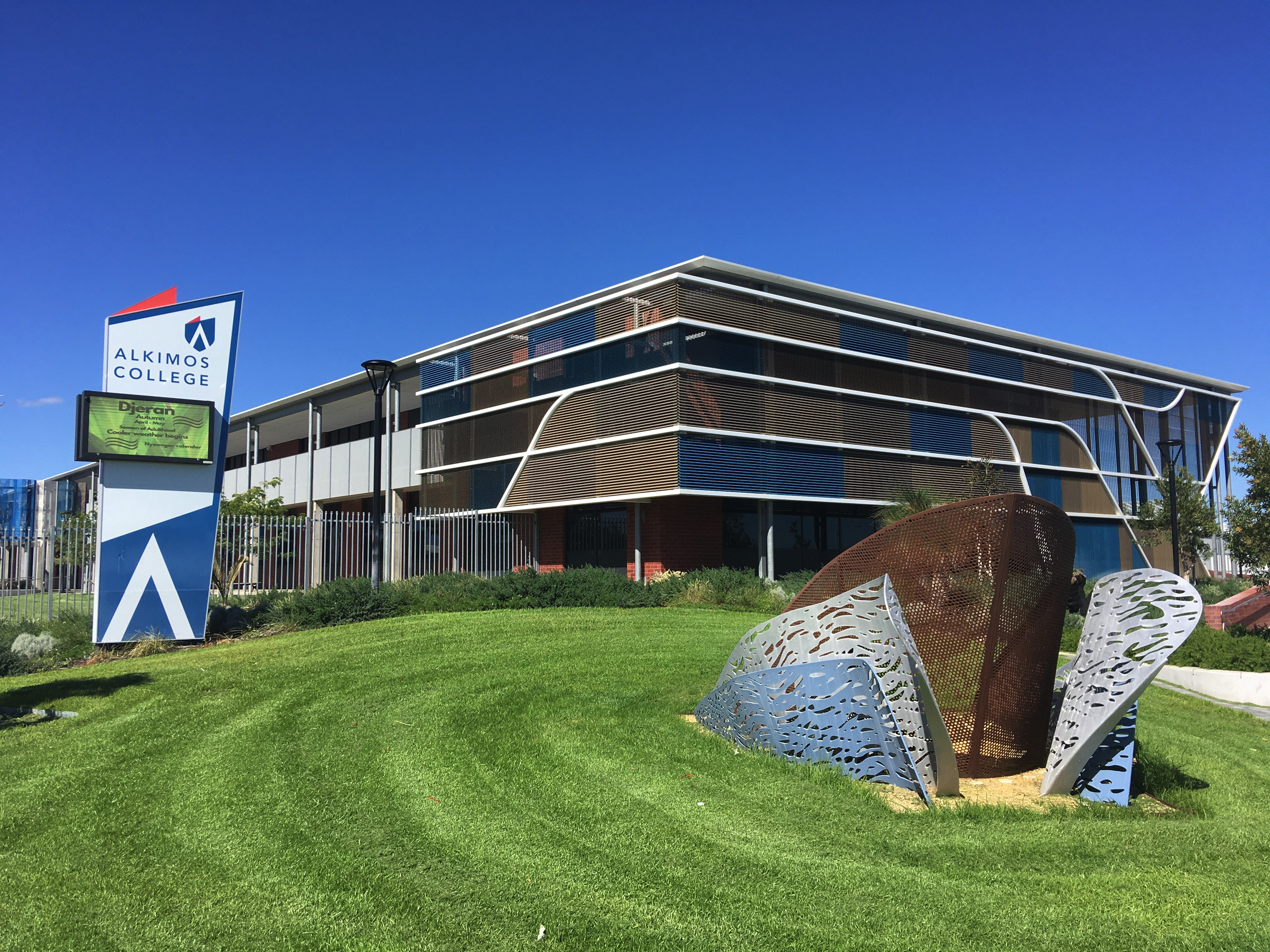
- Alkimos College in April 2021

Location
- 101 Santorini Promenade; Alkimos, Western Australia; Australia
- Coordinates: 31°37′44″S 115°41′36″E

Information
- Type: Independent public co-educational day school
- Motto: Aspire Act Achieve
- Opened: 2020; 5 years ago
- Educational authority: WA Department of Education
- Specialist: Specialised Autism Learning Program
- Principal: Nancy Mcnally
- Staff: 110.4
- Years: 7–12
- Enrolment: 995 (22 July 2024)
- Campus type: Suburban
- Colour
- Website: www.alkimoscollege.wa.edu.au

Alkimos College is an Independent public co-educational high day school, located in the Perth suburb of Alkimos, Western Australia. It has an enrolment of 995 students as of 22 July 2024, and employs 110.4 full-time equivalent staff as of 2 May 2024.

== Overview ==
The far northern suburbs of Perth are some of the fastest growing areas of the metropolitan area. There was a need for another secondary school to relieve pressure on Butler College, which had almost 1,800 students in 2018. The school started construction on stage 1 in 2018, with Butler North Secondary School as a planning name. Stage 1 involves construction of classrooms, administration, student services, a cafeteria and sports facilities. It cost A$48.4 million.

A community survey was done in March 2019 to determine the school's name. The options were Alkimos College, Alkimos Secondary College and Alkimos Community College. Alkimos College was decided to be the name of the school.

There are various sculptures around the school that are inspired by the Alkimos wreck and the local coastline and ocean, built as part of the Western Australian Government's percent for art scheme. The Alkimos wreck sculpture is lit up at night, making it visible to the surrounding suburb.

The school opened as Alkimos College to 176 Year 7 students. It is planned to grow to 1,500 Year 7 to 12 students in 2025. Stage 2 of construction is planned to be complete by 2024, in time for the first cohort of Year 11 students. Stage 2 includes additional classrooms and a performing arts centre. An additional secondary school is projected to be needed in Alkimos by 2024.

== Programs ==
=== Specialised Autism Learning Program ===
Alkimos College is one of 16 schools in Western Australia to operate a specialised autism spectrum disorder learning program. It is a Department of Education endorsed program. The program is also in place at Alkimos Primary School, so local students in the program can have a seamless transition between Kindergarten and Year 12.

== Local intake area ==
Alkimos College's local intake area covers Alkimos, Eglinton (south of Pipidinny Road), part of Jindalee (north of Oceania Avenue) and part of Butler. Students living in the local intake area have a guaranteed place at the school if they apply.

== Student numbers ==
Year	Number
2020	176
2021	350

== See also ==
- List of schools in the Perth metropolitan area
