= Alkimos, Western Australia =

Alkimos
- Suburb
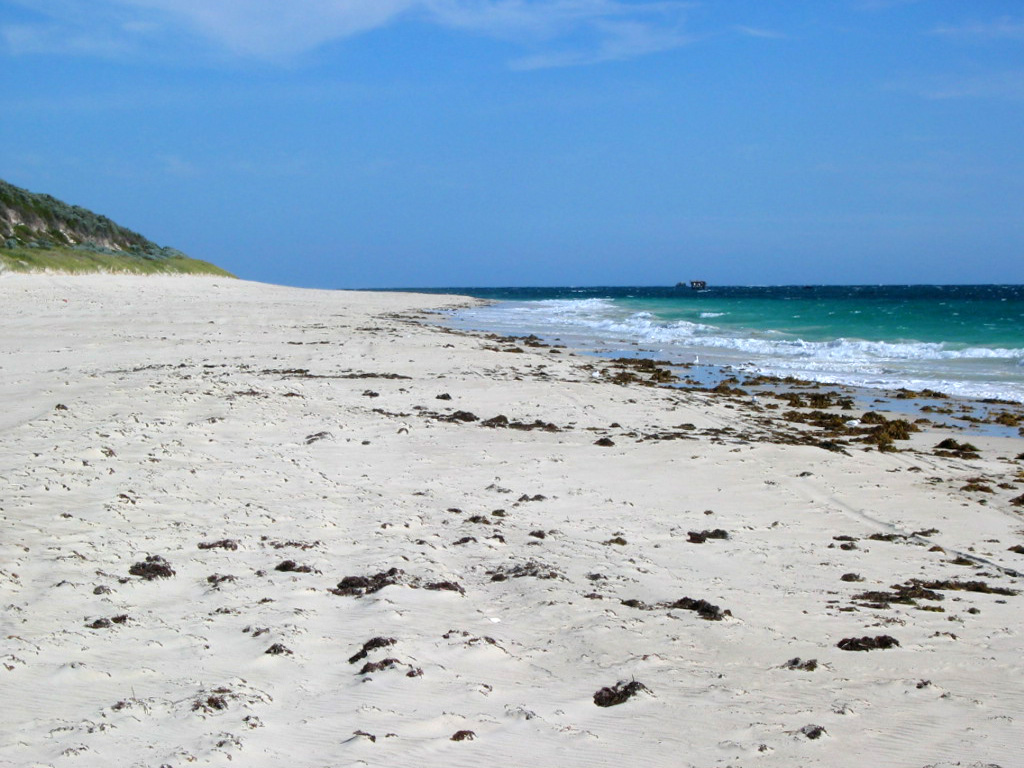
- Looking south along Alkimos Beach towards wreck
- Interactive map of Alkimos
- Coordinates: 31.607°S 115.669°E
- Country: Australia
- State: Western Australia
- City: Perth
- LGA: City of Wanneroo
- Location: 42 km (26 mi) NNW of Perth CBD

Government
  - State electorate: Mindarie
  - Federal division: Pearce

Area
  - Total: 13 km^{2} (5.0 sq mi)

Population
  - Total: 10,203 (SAL 2021)
- Postcode: 6038
Suburbs around Alkimos
	Eglinton	Carabooda
Indian Ocean	Alkimos	Nowergup
	Jindalee	Butler

Alkimos is a coastal suburb of Perth, Western Australia, located 42 kilometres (26 mi) north-northwest of Perth's central business district. It is part of the City of Wanneroo local government area.

The suburb is part of the Alkimos-Eglinton region which is being developed by the State Government as a future satellite city.

== Geography ==
Alkimos lies roughly between the future Mitchell Freeway reserve to the east and the Indian Ocean to the west. The locality is bounded to the north by Eglinton, to the east by Carabooda and to the south by the suburbs of Butler and Jindalee.

As of 2006, before development, for most part the suburb was covered by a wide array of native scrubland, woodland and heath typical of the Swan Coastal Plain, varying in condition from excellent to completely degraded, and including Xanthorrhoea preissii (traditionally known as "balga"), banksia, sheoak and Nuytsia floribunda. Some degradation had occurred due to uncontrolled vehicular access, clearing for stock grazing, fire and rabbits. However, by 2025, housing estates had taken up much of the northern and southern parts of the suburb.

== History ==
Alkimos is named after the shipwreck of the Greek freighter Alkimos that ran aground on the coast nearby in 1963. The wreck lies approximately 410 metres off shore.

The State Government has planned to develop the Alkimos and Eglinton region to be a satellite city, covered by Amendment 1029/33 to the Metropolitan Region Scheme (May 2006). LandCorp estimates that 55,000 people would live in the area once it is complete, and that the centre will include "hospitals, tertiary educational institutions, major retail, commercial and recreational facilities". The Environmental Protection Authority, however, raised concerns in November 2005 about the amendment, saying that it "would, in part, be inconsistent with the conservation and protection of significant environmental and geoheritage values in the area", and recommended that the amount of reserves be greatly increased. On 5 November 2008, the WA State Government announced it was actively seeking a development partner for the project.

== Demographics ==
Alkimos has a population of 10,203 according to the Australian Bureau of Statistics (ABS) 2021 census. The suburb was not enumerated in the 2011 census.

== Amenities and facilities ==
Amongst others there is an IGA supermarket in Alkimos Beach and a Coles supermarket in Alkimos Trinity estate. Eglinton Rocks and the Alkimos wreck can be viewed from the coastline, where beaches are accessible by sandtrack which can be reached from the Marmion Avenue stretch.

== Education ==
The 3 public primary schools in Alkimos are Alkimos Primary School, Alkimos Beach Primary School and Shorehaven Primary School. The public high school in Alkimos is Alkimos College, which opened to Year 7 students in 2020, and has grown to house Year 12 students at the start of 2025. Year 8 to 12 students can go to the nearby Butler College. St James Anglican School is a K–11 Anglican school in Alkimos, which expanded to include Year 12 students in 2021. It is expected that another public high school will be needed in Alkimos by 2024.

== Infrastructure ==
Construction of the Alkimos Seawater Desalination Plant commenced in 2024, next to the Alkimos Wastewater Treatment Plant.

== Transport ==
In 2008, Marmion Avenue was extended through the suburb, which had previously been unserviced by the road network. In 2023, the Mitchell Freeway was extended to the southern part of the suburb, terminating at Romeo Road. Transperth operates trains to Yanchep, with Alkimos station in the suburb. The bus routes in the area are operated by Swan Transit.

The Yanchep railway line was extended through the area with Alkimos railway station opened on 15 July 2024.

=== Bus ===
- 486 Alkimos station to Butler station – serves Marmion Avenue
- 487 Alkimos (Trinity Estate) to Butler station – serves Benenden Avenue, Howden Parade, Piazza Link, Santorini Promenade and Hollington Boulevard
- 488 Alkimos (Trinity Estate) to Butler station – serves Benenden Avenue
- 491 Alkimos station to Eglinton station – serves Marmion Avenue, Shorehaven Boulevard and Heath Avenue
- 492 Alkimos station to Eglinton station – serves Marmion Avenue

In October 2024, the Public Transport Authority opened a new depot in Alkimos with capacity for 90 buses.
