= Alkimos Seawater Desalination Plant =

Desalination plant under construction in Perth, Western Australia

Coordinates: 31°37′03″S 115°40′21″E

- Interactive map of Alkimos Seawater Desalination Plant
- Location: Alkimos, Western Australia
- Completion date: 2028 (planned)

The Alkimos Seawater Desalination Plant is an under construction desalination plant in Alkimos, Western Australia.

== History ==
In June 2022, the Government of Western Australia announced its intention to build the Alkimos Seawater Desalination Plant. In 2024, the Water Corporation awarded a contract to Acciona and Jacobs Solutions to build a desalination plant in Alkimos, Western Australia to serve Perth. It will be built next to the Alkimos Wastewater Treatment Plant.

A 33-kilometre (21 mi) underground pipeline will be built by the Georgiou Group from the plant. It will pass through Carabooda, Nowergup, Neerabup, Banksia Grove, Mariginiup and Jandabup before reaching the Wanneroo Reservoir. The pipeline will be largely below ground except for a small section crossing the Yanchep railway line near Alkimos station.
