= Eglinton, Western Australia =

Suburb of Perth, Western Australia

Eglinton
- Suburb
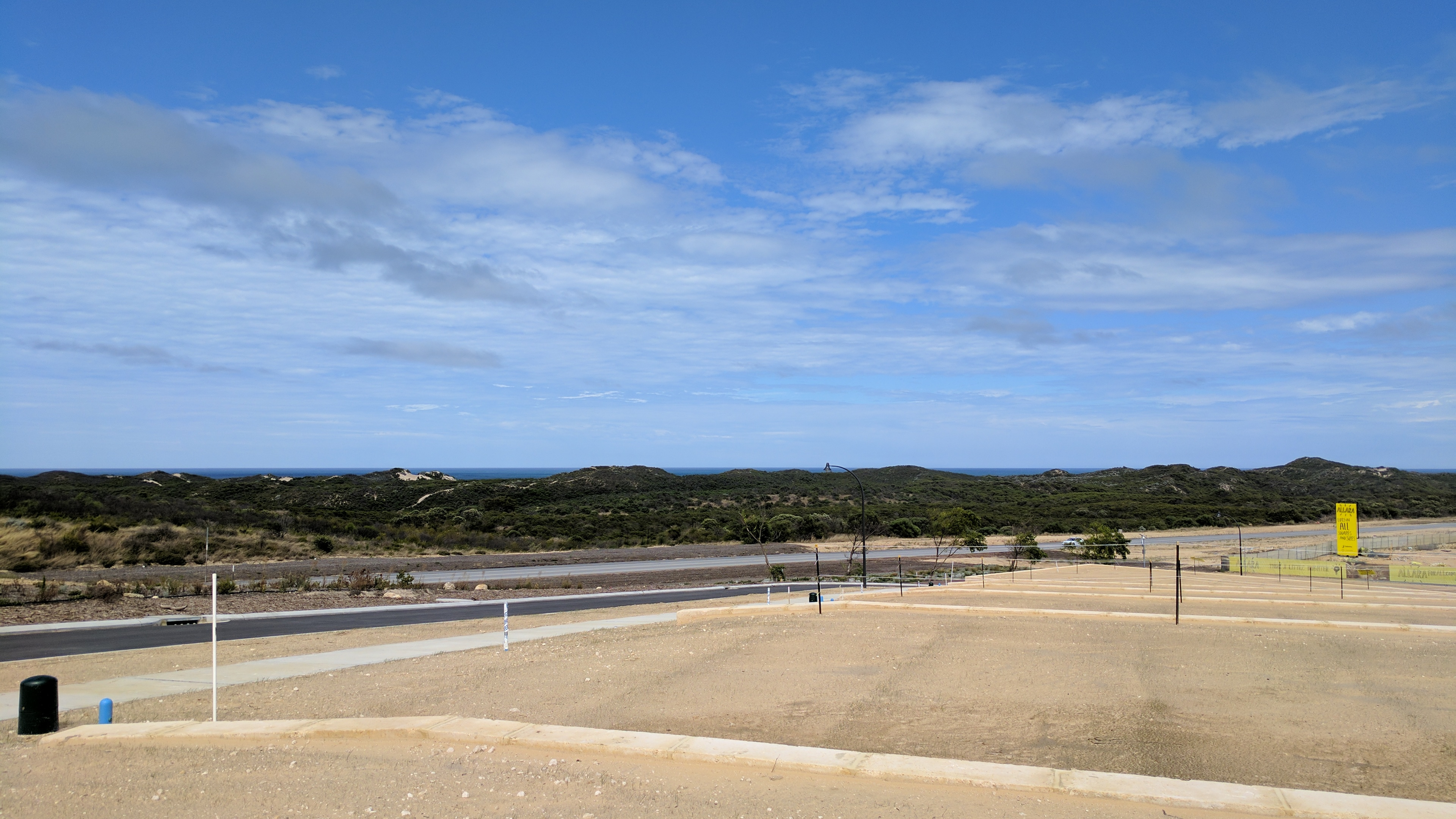
- Looking from Allara Estate, over Marmion Avenue towards the Indian Ocean
- Interactive map of Eglinton
- Coordinates: 31.58°S 115.668°E
- Country: Australia
- State: Western Australia
- City: Perth
- LGA: City of Wanneroo
- Location: 44 km (27 mi) from Perth CBD

Government
  - State electorate: Butler
  - Federal division: Pearce

Area
  - Total: 10 km^{2} (3.9 sq mi)

Population
  - Total: 3,705 (SAL 2021)
- Postcode: 6034
Suburbs around Eglinton
	Yanchep
Indian Ocean	Eglinton	Carabooda
	Alkimos

Eglinton is a locality in the Western Australian capital city of Perth, approximately 44 kilometres (27 mi) north of Perth's central business district on the Indian Ocean. For the most part, the suburb is covered in native banksia woodland, scrubland, and heath typical of the Swan Coastal Plain. However, in recent years, there has been growth in residential estates, with a town centre to be built in the near future.

Part of the City of Wanneroo local government area, it is bounded to the north by Yanchep, to the east by Carabooda, and to the south by Alkimos.

The area is part of the Alkimos-Eglinton region being developed by the state government as future satellite city. Eglinton is now being developed with the Amberton estate from Stockland and Allara Estate from Satterley.

== History ==
Eglinton was approved in 1974 as a suburb name and is named after the barque Eglinton, which was wrecked on rocks near Alkimos that now bear its name.

Prior to European settlement, the Mooro tribe of the Noongar people had lived in what has become the northern Perth metropolitan region for more than 40,000 years, taking advantage of the abundant food and water around the chain of wetlands on the Swan Coastal Plain. According to local legend, Pipidinny Swamp, located in eastern Eglinton, was created from the blood and meat of the crocodile's tail as he walked back towards the Swan River after his fight with the shark.

In 1865, European settlers used the Aboriginal tracks along the west side of the lakes as a stock route from Dongara to Fremantle. The portion of the stock route between Joondalup and Yanchep was made part of the Bicentennial Heritage Trails Network in 1988 and is now known as the Yaberoo Budjara Heritage Trail.

The area is mostly scrub and bushland today but also has some low-level agriculture based along Wanneroo and Pipidinny Roads as well as housing estates abutting Marmion Avenue.

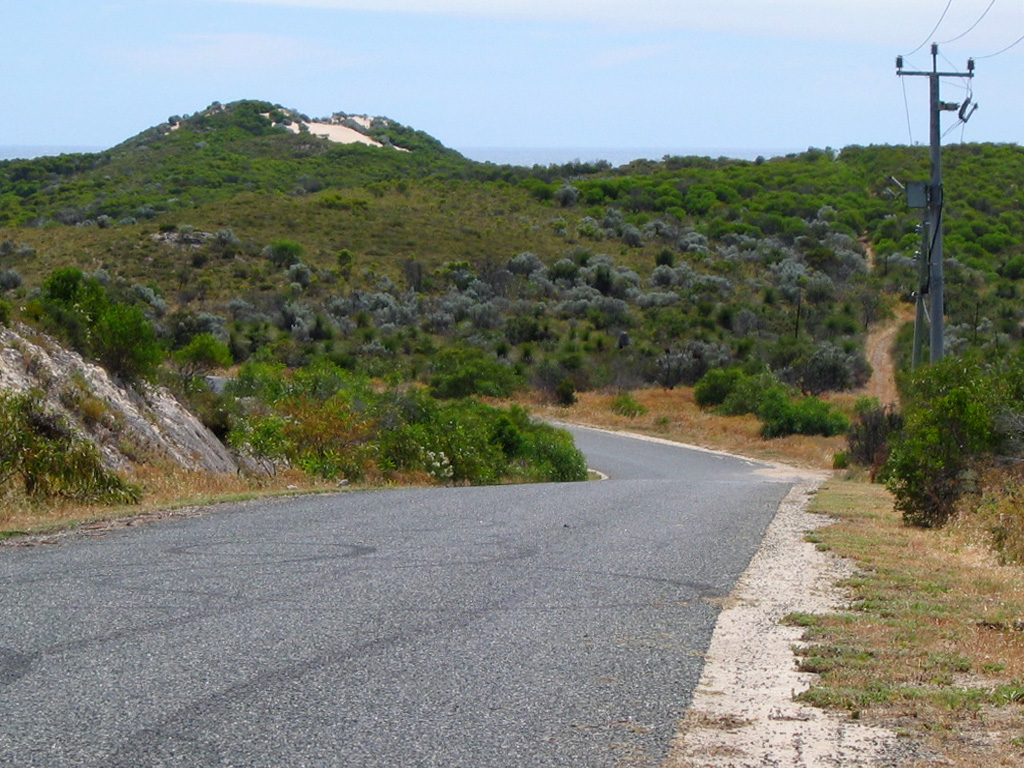
Pipidinny Road looking towards coast.

== Planning ==
In May 2006, plans for an Alkimos-Eglinton satellite city, covered by Amendment 1029/33 to the Metropolitan Region Scheme were revealed. At that point, LandCorp estimated that 55,000 people would live in the area once it is complete, that the centre will include "hospitals, tertiary educational institutions, major retail, commercial and recreational facilities" and that stage 1 blocks would be offered for sale in 2008. The Environmental Protection Authority, however, raised concerns in November 2005 about the amendment, saying that it "would, in part, be inconsistent with the conservation and protection of significant environmental and geoheritage values in the area", and recommended that the amount of reserves be greatly increased. The next major wastewater treatment plant for the metropolitan region was built in the Eglinton area. It is designed to provide catchment from Two Rocks south to the existing Beenyup treatment plant catchment boundary.

== Geography ==
Eglinton lies roughly between the future Mitchell Freeway reserve to the east and the Indian Ocean to the west.

Eglinton's population was measured by the ABS in the 2016 census as 2,365. In 2021 this increased to 3,705.

== Facilities ==
Eglinton has no conventional facilities at the present stage but the Amberton and Allara estates are now under development with some houses built, many more under construction and many blocks titled.

Eglinton was previously accessible only by Pipidinny Road, which runs via Pipidinny Swamp to within 200 metres (656 ft) of the beach. The Alkimos wreck can be viewed from the nearby coastline, where almost untouched beaches are accessible by sand track but a paved road is currently under construction. The suburb offers a wide array of native scrubland, woodland and heath, varying in condition from excellent to completely degraded, and including Xanthorrhoea preissii (commonly known as grasstree), banksia, sheoak and Nuytsia floribunda. Some degradation has occurred due to uncontrolled vehicular access, clearing for stock grazing, fire and rabbits.

== Transport ==
In 2008, Marmion Avenue was extended through the suburb, which had previously been unserviced by the road network. Transperth operates the 490 and 491 bus services from Butler railway station, which pass through the suburb to Two Rocks and Yanchep respectively; the bus routes are operated by Swan Transit.

The Yanchep line runs through Eglinton with the Eglinton railway station

=== Bus ===
- 491 Eglinton Station to Alkimos Station – serves Marmion Avenue and Heath Avenue

Bus routes serving Marmion Avenue:

- 492 Eglinton Station to Alkimos Station
- 494, 495 and 496 Eglinton Station to Yanchep Station

=== Rail ===
- Yanchep Line
  - Eglinton Station
