= Butler College (Perth) =

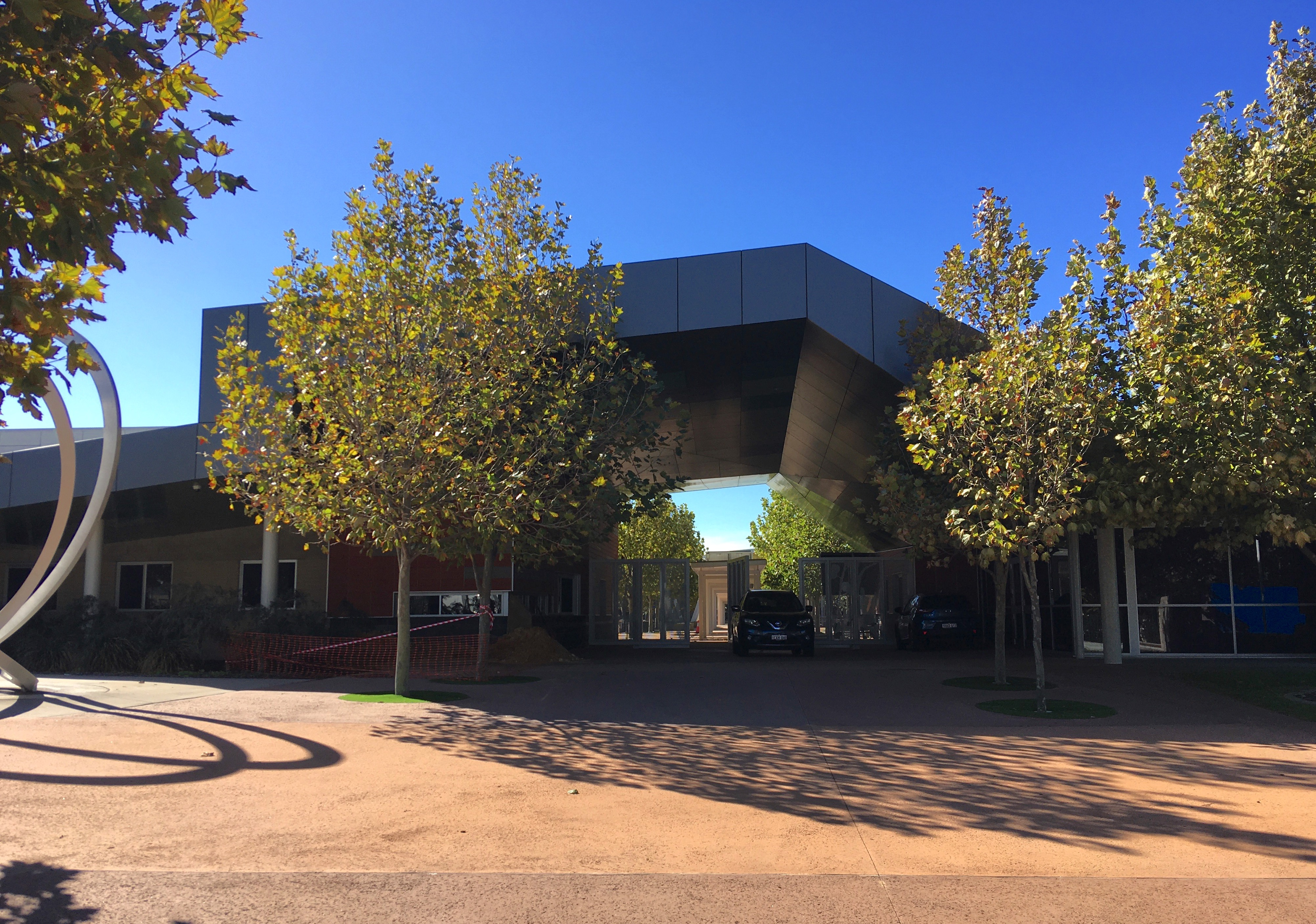

Location
- 15 McCormack Boulevard; Butler, Western Australia; Perth; Australia; 31°39′07″S 115°42′32″E

Information
- Type: Independent public co-educational day school
- Motto: Knowledge Integrity Respect
- Opened: 2013; 13 years ago
- Educational authority: WA Department of Education
- Principal: Ryan Govan
- Years: 7–12
- Enrolment: 1,090 (2025)
- Campus type: Suburban
- Colour: Dark blue
- Website: www.butlercollege.wa.edu.au

Butler College is an Independent public co-educational high day school located in Butler, a northern suburb of Perth, Western Australia. Founded in 2013, the school has been running for 13 years to date. The values, Knowledge, Integrity and Respect have shaped students beginnings and continue to guide how we learn, lead, and relate to one another.

== Background ==
Butler College opened at the beginning of 2013 as an Independent Public School. It is situated in one of the fastest growing areas of Perth, with student numbers rapidly increasing since it opened. Alkimos College opened to year 7 students in 2020 to take pressure off Butler College. Another secondary school is planned to be built in Alkimos by 2024.

== Academic results ==
Year	Rank	Median ATAR	Eligible students	Students with ATAR	% Students with ATAR	Ref
2021	—N/a	77.40	157	24	15.29%	
2020	39	83.70	170	36	21.18%	
2019	123	67.75	182	33	18.13%	
2018	128	67.65	200	72	36.00%	
2017	142	57.25	214	71	33.18%	

== Student numbers ==
Year	Number
2014	618
2015	1,277
2016	1,581
2017	1,840
2018	1,796
2019	1,711
2020	1,633
2021	1,517
2022	~
2023	~
2024	1,123
2025	1,090
2026	in progress

== Staff ==
admin
principal	Ryan Govan
vice principal	Mark Humphries
vice principal	Daniel Lambrinidis
vice principal	Shannon Sibly
vice principal	Kate Burrows
vice principal	Alysse Priddis

== See also ==
- List of schools in the Perth metropolitan area
