= Eglinton railway station, Perth =

Railway station in Eglinton, Western Australia

Eglinton
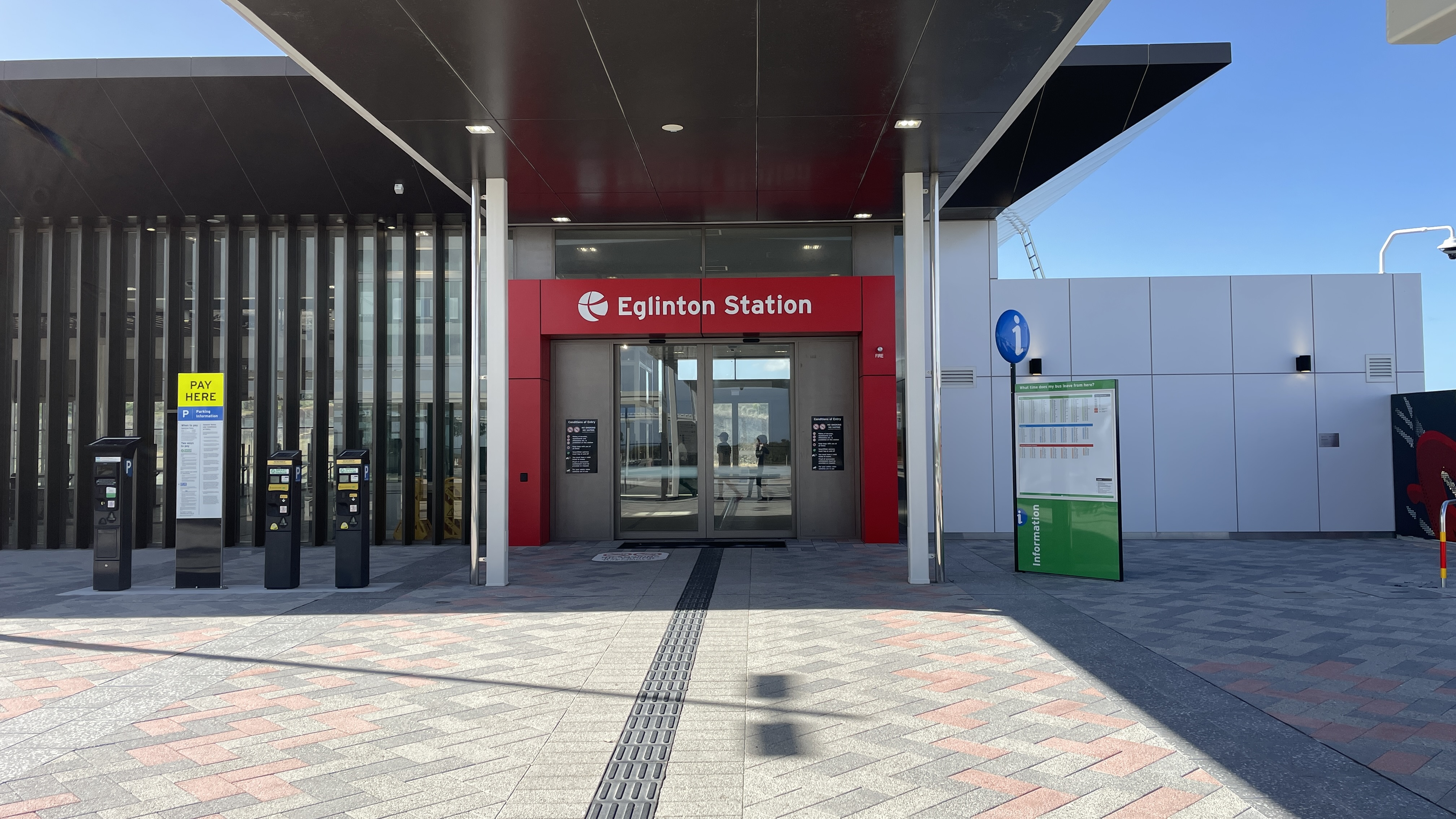
- Station building and entrance, July 2025

General information
- Location: Pipidinny Road; Eglinton, Western Australia; Australia
- Coordinates: 31°35′01″S 115°40′21″E
- Owner: Public Transport Authority
- Operator: Public Transport Authority
- Line: Yanchep line
- Distance: 46.7 km (29.0 mi) from Perth Underground
- Platforms: 2 side platforms
- Tracks: 2
- Bus stands: 8
- Connections: Bus

Construction
- Structure type: Cutting
- Parking: Approximately 400 bays
- Cycle facilities: Yes
- Accessible: Yes

Other information
- Fare zone: 5

History
- Opened: 14 July 2024

Passengers
- Predicted: 4,792 per day in 2031

Services
Preceding station	Transperth	Following station
Alkimos towards Elizabeth Quay via Perth Underground	Yanchep line	Yanchep Terminus
Location
- Location of Eglinton station

Eglinton railway station is a suburban rail station in Eglinton, a suburb of Perth, Western Australia. Situated on Transperth's Yanchep line, the station consists of two side platforms within a cutting below a ground-level concourse, with a bus interchange.

Since planning for the Yanchep line, originally known as the Joondalup line, began in the 1980s, it has been planned to eventually be extended to Yanchep. After an extension to Butler opened in 2014, detailed planning began for a 14.5-kilometre (9.0 mi), three-station extension to Yanchep, which included Eglinton station. Construction began in mid-2020. Originally planned to be completed by the end of 2021, the extension opened on 14 July 2024.

Trains at Eglinton station run at up to a five-minute frequency during peak hour, lowering to a fifteen-minute frequency off-peak and on weekends and public holidays. At night, trains are half-hourly or hourly. The journey to Perth Underground station takes 44 minutes. Eglinton station is linked by bus to Alkimos station to the south and Yanchep station to the north.

== Description ==
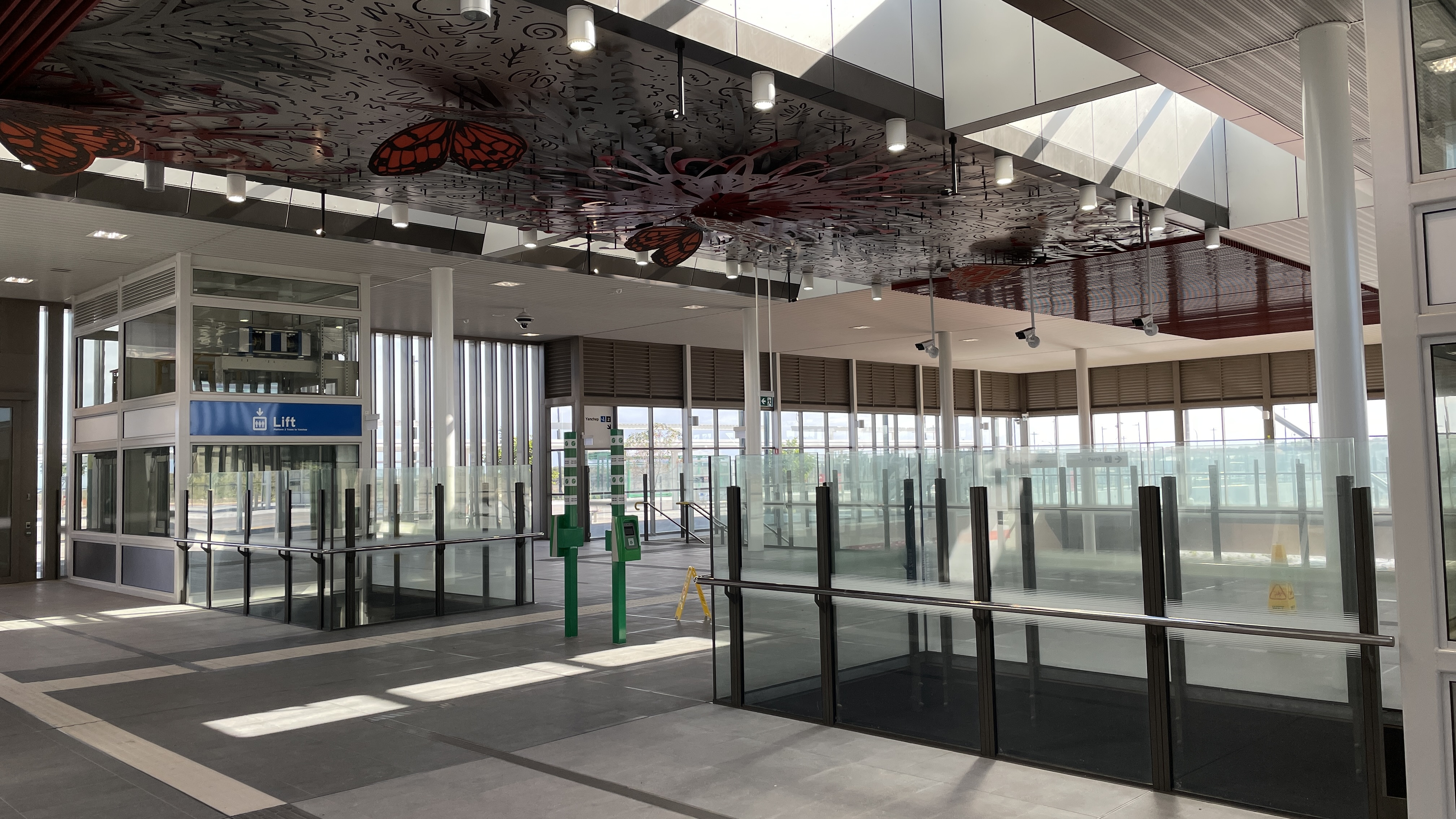
Concourse

Eglinton station is in Eglinton, a suburb of Perth in Western Australia. It is located south of Pipidinny Road and east of Marmion Avenue. The station is 46.7 kilometres (29.0 mi) from Perth Underground station and is in fare zone five. The next stations are Alkimos to the south and Yanchep to the north.

Eglinton station consists of two 150-metre-long (490 ft) side platforms sunk into a cutting. On top of the platforms is a ground-level concourse, connected to the platforms by a set of lifts and stairs. The station was designed with its platforms in a cutting to improve the pedestrian experience, to lower the impact of noise, and to lower the visual impact. There are entrances on the west and east sides of the station, but only the west entrance was opened initially as the land on the east side has not yet been developed as of the station's construction. West of the station is the bus interchange with eight stands, and north-west is a car park with 392 bays. Other facilities include parking for bicycles and toilets. The station is fully accessible.

=== Public art ===
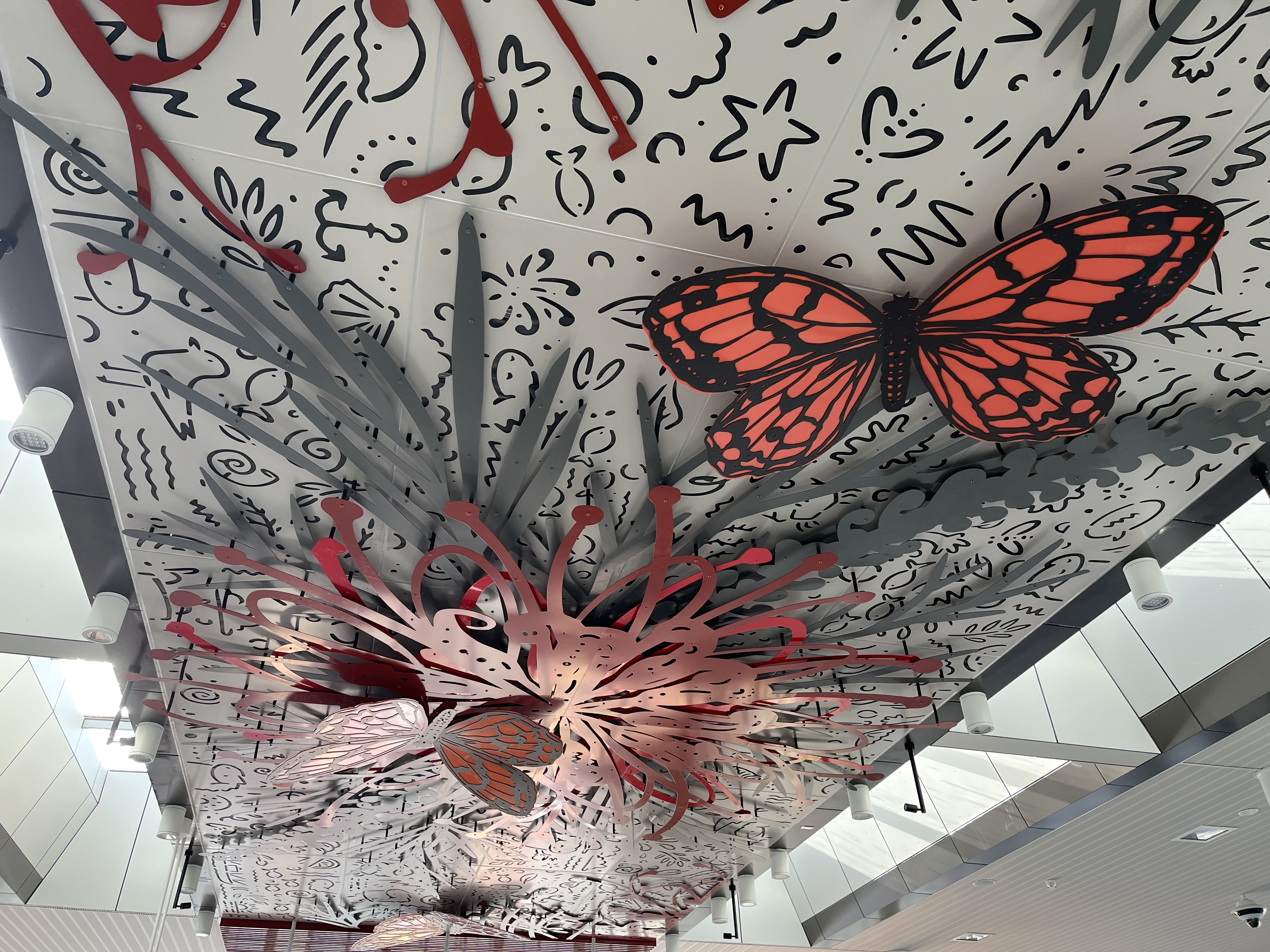
World Around Us, by Ian Mutch

On the ceiling and entry screens are art pieces by Ian Mutch called World Around Us and Rhythm in Nature respectively, which consist of fabricated aluminium powder coated to look like Grevillea preissii plants and western xenica butterflies. On the platform's retaining walls is Step by Colour, by Concreto, which consists of coloured tiles representing the local landscape and transition from the ocean to tuart forests.

== History ==
The original stage of the Yanchep line, formerly known as the Joondalup line, began construction in November 1989. It was opened between Perth station and Joondalup station on 20 December 1992, and was extended to Currambine station on 8 August 1993. An extension to Clarkson station opened on 4 October 2004, and an extension to Butler station opened on 21 September 2014. When planning for the line began in the 1980s, the intention was that it should eventually reach Yanchep. In 1995, the state government reached an agreement with Tokyu Corporation for a land swap for the land required for the railway all the way to Two Rocks, including in Eglinton.

Eglinton station was built as part of the Yanchep Rail Extension, which involved the construction of 14.5 kilometres (9.0 mi) of track and two other stations: Alkimos and Yanchep. The Yanchep Rail Extension originated from a commitment by the Labor Party prior to winning the 2017 state election to build the extension as part of its Metronet project. In December 2019, the main contract for the Yanchep Rail Extension and the Thornlie–Cockburn Link was awarded to the NEWest Alliance, a joint venture of CPB Contractors and Downer Group.

Earthworks for the Yanchep Rail Extension began in mid-2020. The design of Eglinton station was revealed in August 2020. From August 2021 to April 2023, Pipidinny Road was closed to construct a bridge across the railway line and for the construction of Eglinton station. The closure was originally meant to take nine months, but it was extended due to "additional works to accommodate utility services, the widening of Pipidinny Road, and challenging ground conditions impeding bridge works". Foundation works for Eglinton station had begun by the end of 2021. By May 2022, the retaining walls were complete. By March 2023, the concrete slab for the concourse level had been poured and by June 2023, the structural steel for the platforms and concourse was complete, the main roof was complete, and backfilling of the platforms was complete. In September 2023, work that was in progress included lift car installation, paving the platforms, and construction of the ceilings and partitions for the platforms and concourse. By March 2024, the building's structure was complete, with work focusing on tiling and internal fit-out. Landscaping and the installation of public art was also underway.

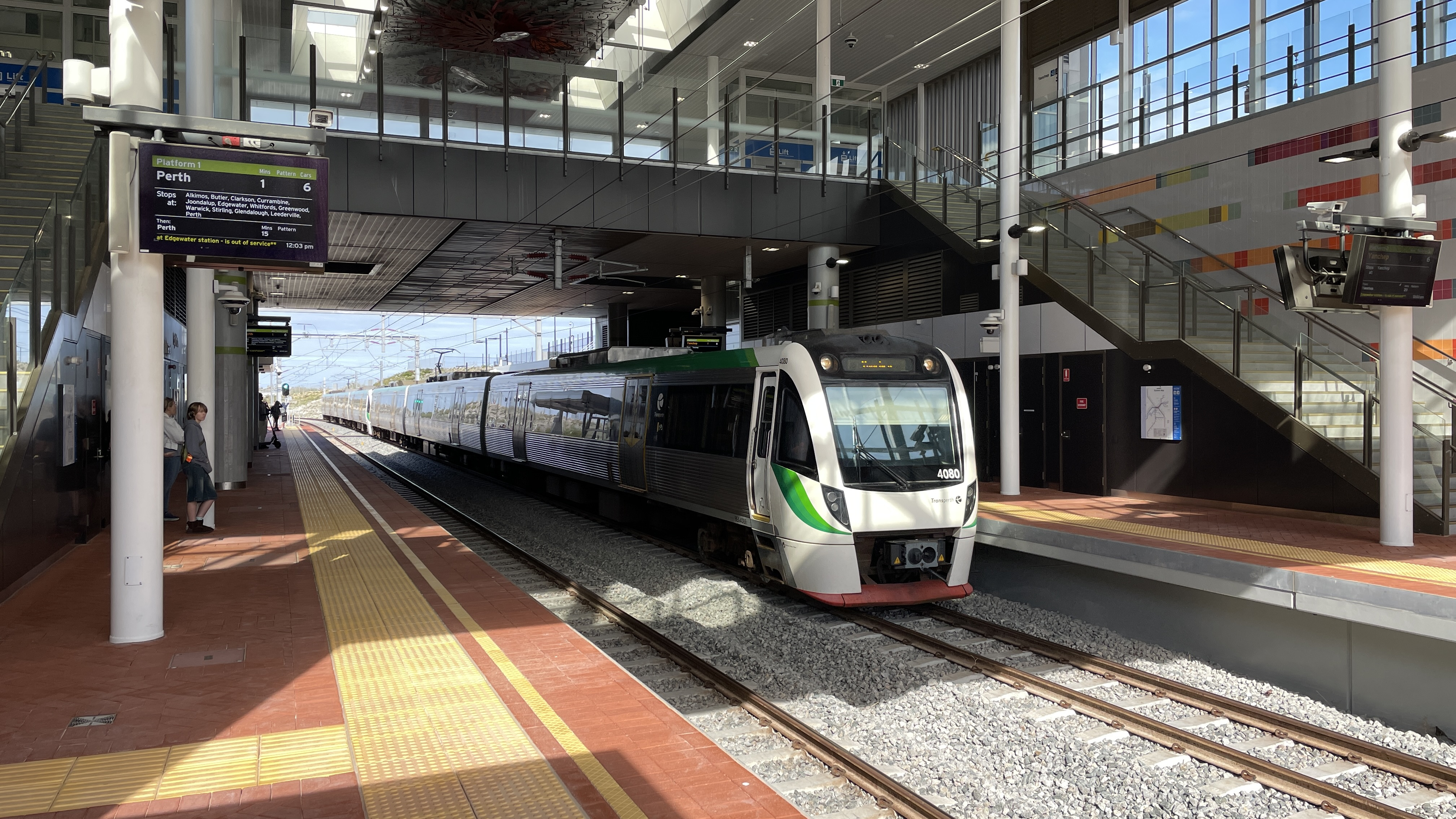
Transperth B-series train on arrives on Platform 2

The Yanchep Rail Extension was originally meant to open in late 2021. This was first delayed to 2022. After the September 2021 state budget, the extension was delayed to late 2023. After the May 2023 state budget, the government said that the Yanchep extension "is due for completion at the end of 2023, with services commencing in the new year". At the end of 2023, the Yanchep extension was still under construction and services were planned to commence in the first half of 2024. The actual opening date was revealed in April 2024. The station officially opened on 14 July 2024, upon which, the Joondalup line was renamed the Yanchep line.

== Services ==
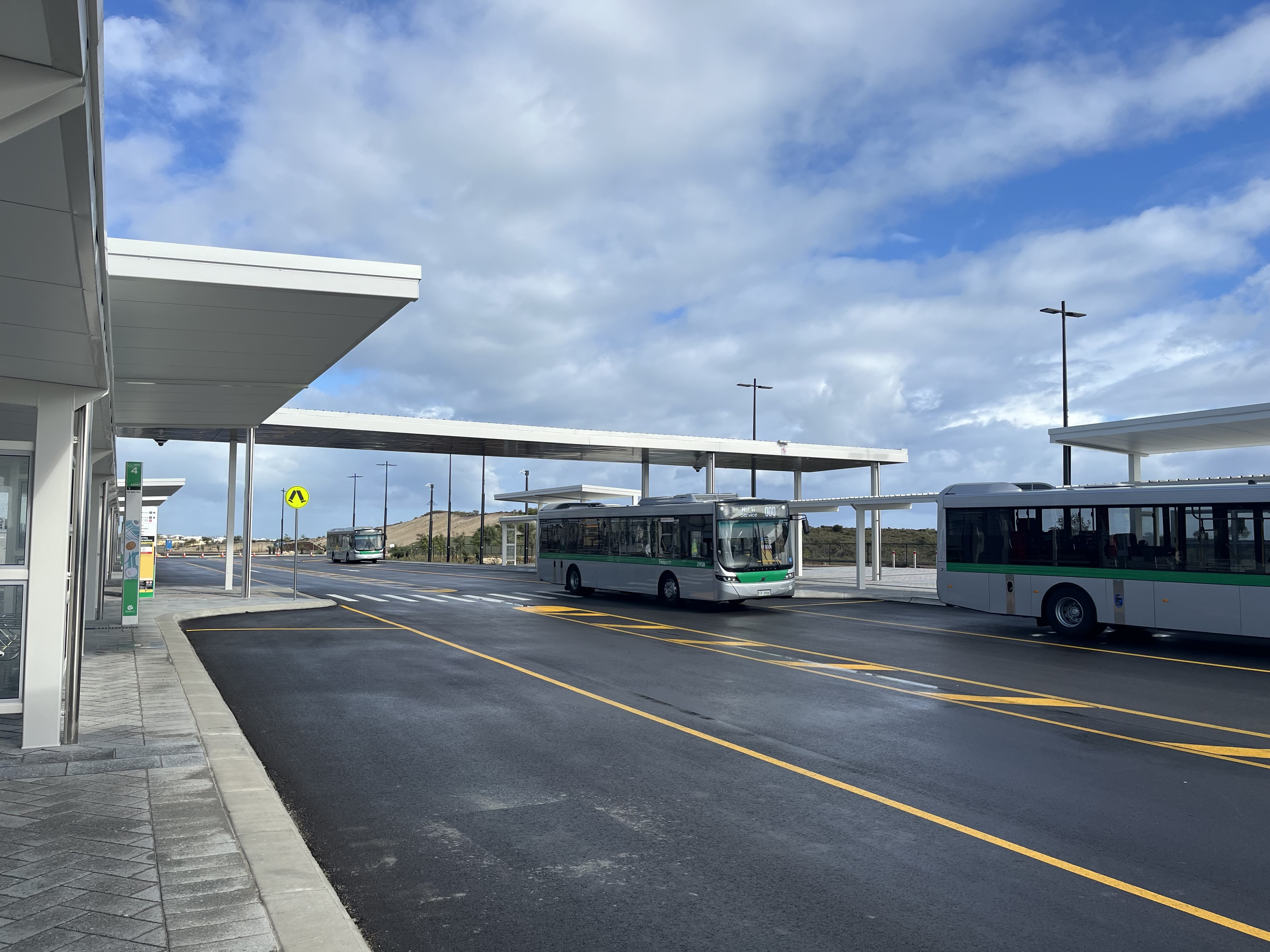
Bus interchange

=== Train services ===
Eglinton station is served by the Yanchep line on the Transperth network. Services are operated by the Public Transport Authority. The line goes between Yanchep and Elizabeth Quay station in the Perth central business district, continuing south from there as the Mandurah line. Peak headways are five to ten minutes, dropping to fifteen minutes outside of peak and on weekends and public holidays. A train journey from Eglinton to Perth Underground takes approximately 45 minutes. It is projected that Eglinton station will have 4,792 boardings per day by 2031.

==== Platforms ====
Eglinton platform arrangement
Stop ID	Platform	Line	Service Pattern	Destination	Via	Notes
99921	1	Yanchep line	All stations	Elizabeth Quay	Perth Underground	
99922	2	Yanchep line	All stations	Yanchep		

=== Bus routes ===
The Eglinton station bus interchange has eight bus stands and five regular bus routes. Routes 491 and 492 run to Alkimos station to the south. Routes 494, 495 and 496 run to Yanchep station to the north. Train replacement buses operate as route 904.
