= Jindalee, Western Australia =

Jindalee
- Suburb
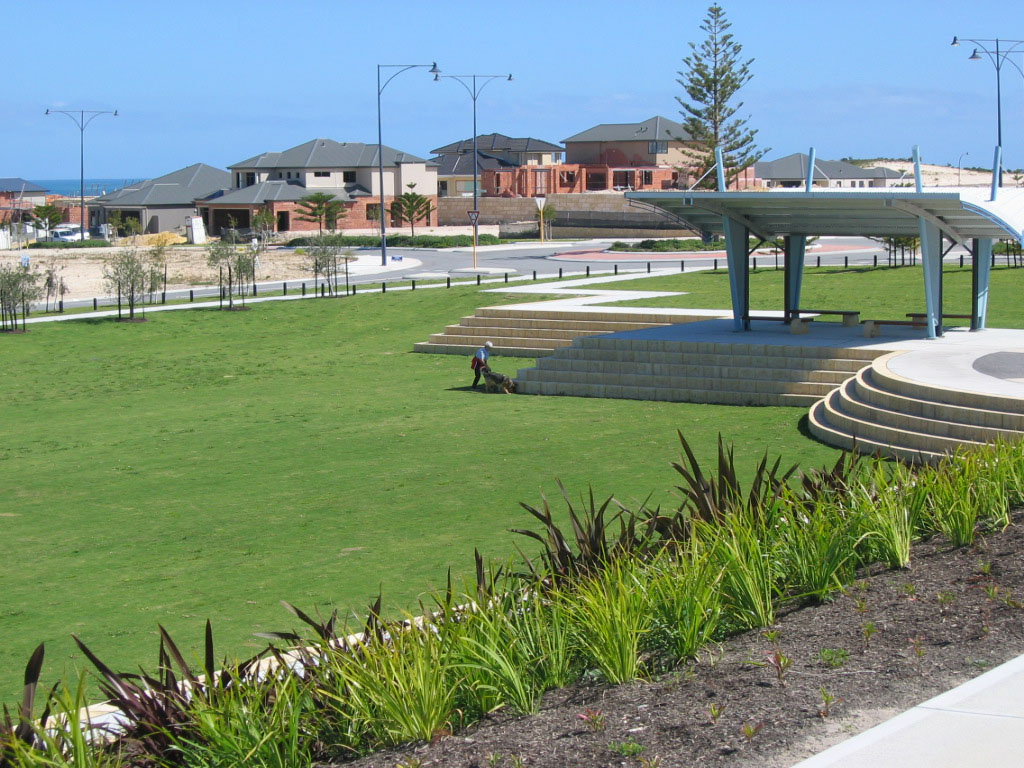
- Park on Jindalee Boulevard
- Interactive map of Jindalee
- Coordinates: 31.651°S 115.692°E
- Country: Australia
- State: Western Australia
- City: Perth
- LGA: City of Wanneroo
- Location: 40 km (25 mi) from Perth CBD
- Established: 2003

Government
  - State electorate: Mindarie
  - Federal division: Pearce

Area
  - Total: 3.6 km^{2} (1.4 sq mi)

Population
  - Total: 4,044 (SAL 2021)
- Postcode: 6036
Suburbs around Jindalee
| | Alkimos | Alkimos |
| Indian Ocean | Jindalee | Butler |
| | Quinns Rocks | Merriwa |

Jindalee is an outer coastal suburb of Perth, Western Australia, located approximately 40 kilometres (25 mi) north of the Perth central business district. Its local government area is the City of Wanneroo.

== Geography ==
Jindalee is bounded by an east-west line near Eglinton Rocks to its north, Butler to the east (Marmion Avenue), and Quinns Rocks to the south (Hampshire Drive). West is the coast of the Indian Ocean. Approximately 75% of the suburb is still within its native state.

== History ==
=== Name ===
The name Jindalee was proposed by the Shire of Wanneroo on 29 June 1979 and is an imported Aboriginal word from an unknown New South Wales dialect meaning "a bare hill", most likely referring to Eglinton Hill, which is covered in low vegetation. The suburb of Jindalee in south-western Brisbane, applied in 1964, notes the same word origin.

=== Suburban development ===
The planning of Jindalee goes back to 1997, but the Butler-Jindalee District Structure Plan was approved on 18 November 2003 by the Western Australian Planning Commission. Satterley is managing the development (titled "Brighton Beachside") in conjunction with the Department of Housing and Works, and around 900 residential lots are proposed. A small cafe/shopping node on the beachfront at the end of Jindalee Boulevard has yet to be approved. Approximately 15% of the lots have been developed, and the projected completion date was 2010.

== Amenities and facilities ==
Jindalee has no conventional facilities at the present stage, apart from a medical centre on Jindalee Boulevard and a fish and chips shop on the foreshore. Brighton Village Shopping Centre on the suburb's eastern border provides basic shopping needs, and Butler Primary School is nearby.

Eglinton Hill provides views of the ocean and the scrub leading north towards Eglinton and Yanchep, and beaches continuous almost to Yanchep are accessible by sand tracks. The undeveloped part of the suburb contains a wide array of native scrubland, woodland, and heath, varying in condition from excellent to completely degraded, and including Xanthorrhoea preissii, banksia, sheoak, and Nuytsia floribunda. Some degradation has occurred due to uncontrolled vehicular access (especially the use of trail bikes), clearing for stock grazing, fire, and rabbits.

== Demographics ==
Historical population
| Year | Pop. | ±% |
|---|---|---|
| 2001 | 0 | — |
| 2006 | 145 | — |
| 2011 | 1,274 | +778.6% |
| 2016 | 2,519 | +97.7% |

Jindalee had a nil population at the 2001 Australian census, but has seen rapid residential development in the latter half of the 2000s (decade). The 2011 population is estimated at approximately 1,274.

== Transport ==
=== Bus ===
- 481 Butler Station to Clarkson Station – serves Marmion Avenue, Roundhouse Parade, Jindalee Boulevard and Santa Barbara Parade
- 482 Butler Station to Clarkson Station – serves Marmion Avenue
- 486 Butler Station to Alkimos Station – serves Marmion Avenue

== Politics ==
Jindalee's political leanings are unclear as there were a negligible number of residents at the time of the last federal and state elections.
