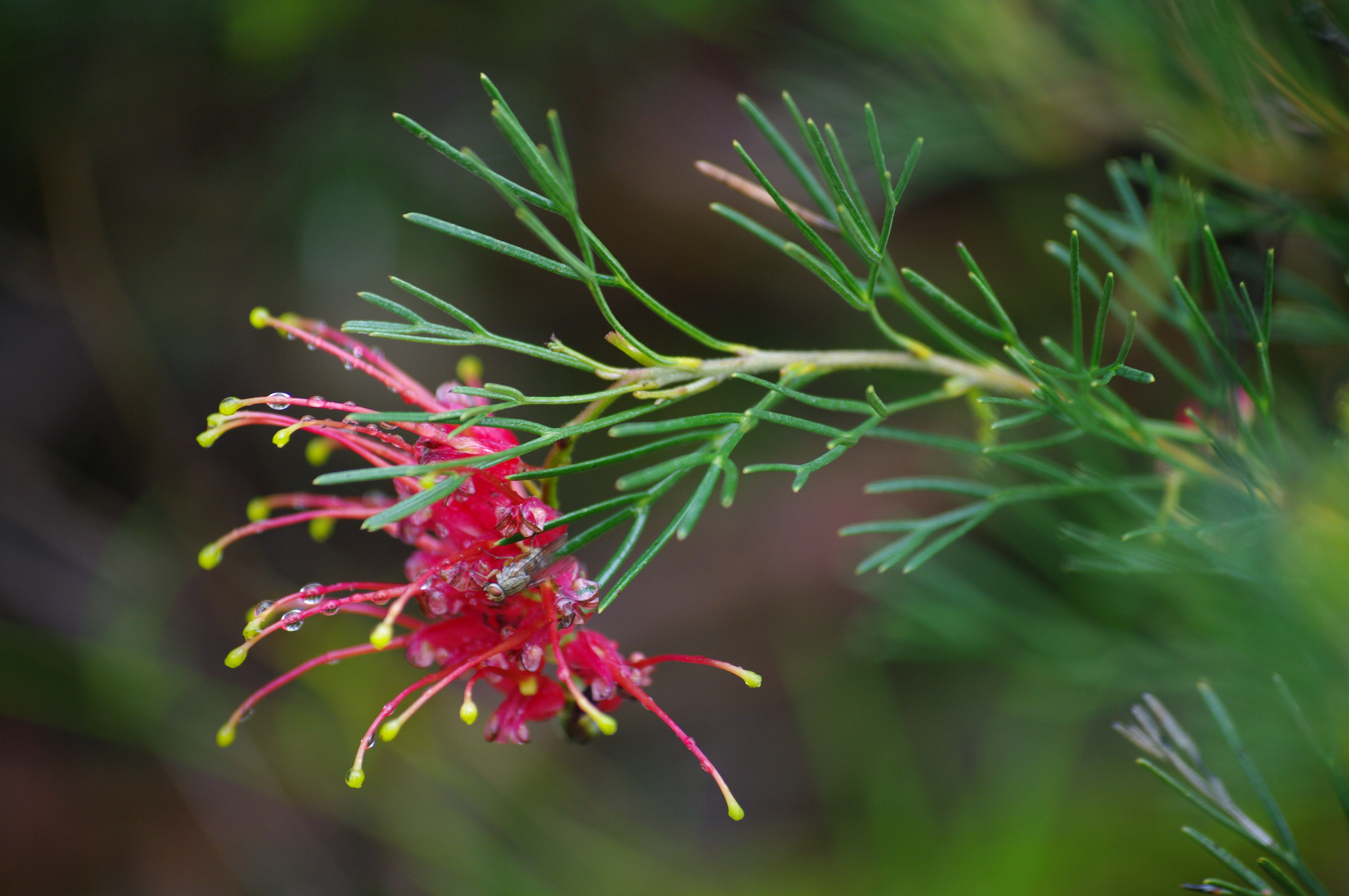
- Grevillea preissii subsp. preissii
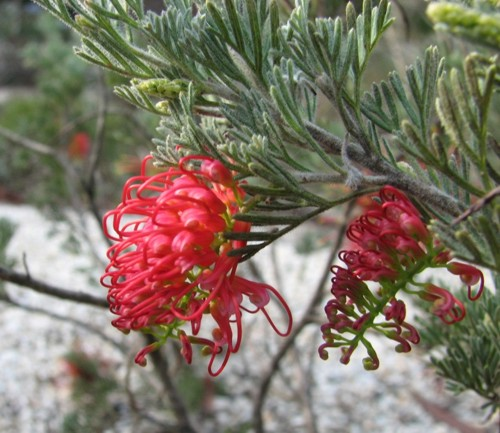
- Subspecies glabrilimba in Maranoa Gardens

Scientific classification
- Kingdom: Plantae
- Clade: Tracheophytes
- Clade: Angiosperms
- Clade: Eudicots
- Order: Proteales
- Family: Proteaceae
- Genus: Grevillea
- Species: G. preissii

Binomial name
- Grevillea preissii Meisn.

Synonyms
- Grevillea thelemanniana subsp. preissii (Meisn.) McGill.

= Grevillea preissii =

Species of shrub endemic to Western Australia

Grevillea preissii is a species of flowering plant in the family Proteaceae and is endemic to the southwest of Western Australia. It is a mounded to spreading or dense, erect shrub, the leaves divided with 5 to 7 linear to more or less cylindrical lobes, and groups of reddish flowers arranged along one side of the flowering rachis.

== Description ==
Grevillea preissii is a mounded to spreading shrub that typically grows to a height of 0.3 m (1 ft 0 in) or a dense, erect shrub to 1.2 m (3 ft 11 in) and usually has woolly- or shaggy-hairy branchlets. The leaves are 25–50 mm (0.98–1.97 in) long and divided, usually with 5 to 7 linear to more or less cylindrical lobes 5–20 mm (0.20–0.79 in) long and 0.5–1.0 mm (0.020–0.039 in) wide. The edges of the leaves are rolled under, obscuring most of the lower surface. The flowers are arranged in groups of 12 to 30 on one side of a rachis 18–30 mm (0.71–1.18 in) long and are red, orange-red, or pinkish red, the pistil 25–28 mm (0.98–1.10 in) long. Flowering mainly occurs from May to October, and the fruit is an oval follicle about 15 mm (0.59 in) long.

== Taxonomy ==
Grevillea preissii was first formally described in 1845 by Carl Meissner in Johann Georg Christian Lehmann's Plantae Preissianae. The specific epithet (preissii) honours Ludwig Preiss.

In 1994, Peter M. Olde and Neil R. Marriott described two subspecies of G. preissii and the names are accepted by the Australian Plant Census:

- Grevillea preissii subsp. gabrilimba Olde & Marriott usually has shaggy-hairy young leaves and branchlets, leaves usually 14–25 mm (0.55–0.98 in) long, the floral rachis and outside of the flowers more or less glabrous.
- Grevillea preissii Meisn. subsp. preissii usually has silky- to woolly-hairy young leaves, branchlets, and floral rachis, the leaves usually 25–50 mm (0.98–1.97 in) long, and the outside of the flowers sparsely hairy.

== Distribution and habitat ==
Grevillea preissii subsp. glabrilimba grows in low heath, in near-coastal areas between Green Head and Leeman and subsp. preissii is found in coastal areas between Lancelin and Bunbury, in the southwest of Western Australia.

== Conservation status ==
Both subspecies of G. preissii are listed as "not threatened" by the Western Australian Government Department of Biodiversity, Conservation and Attractions.
