= Carabooda, Western Australia =

Carabooda
- Suburb
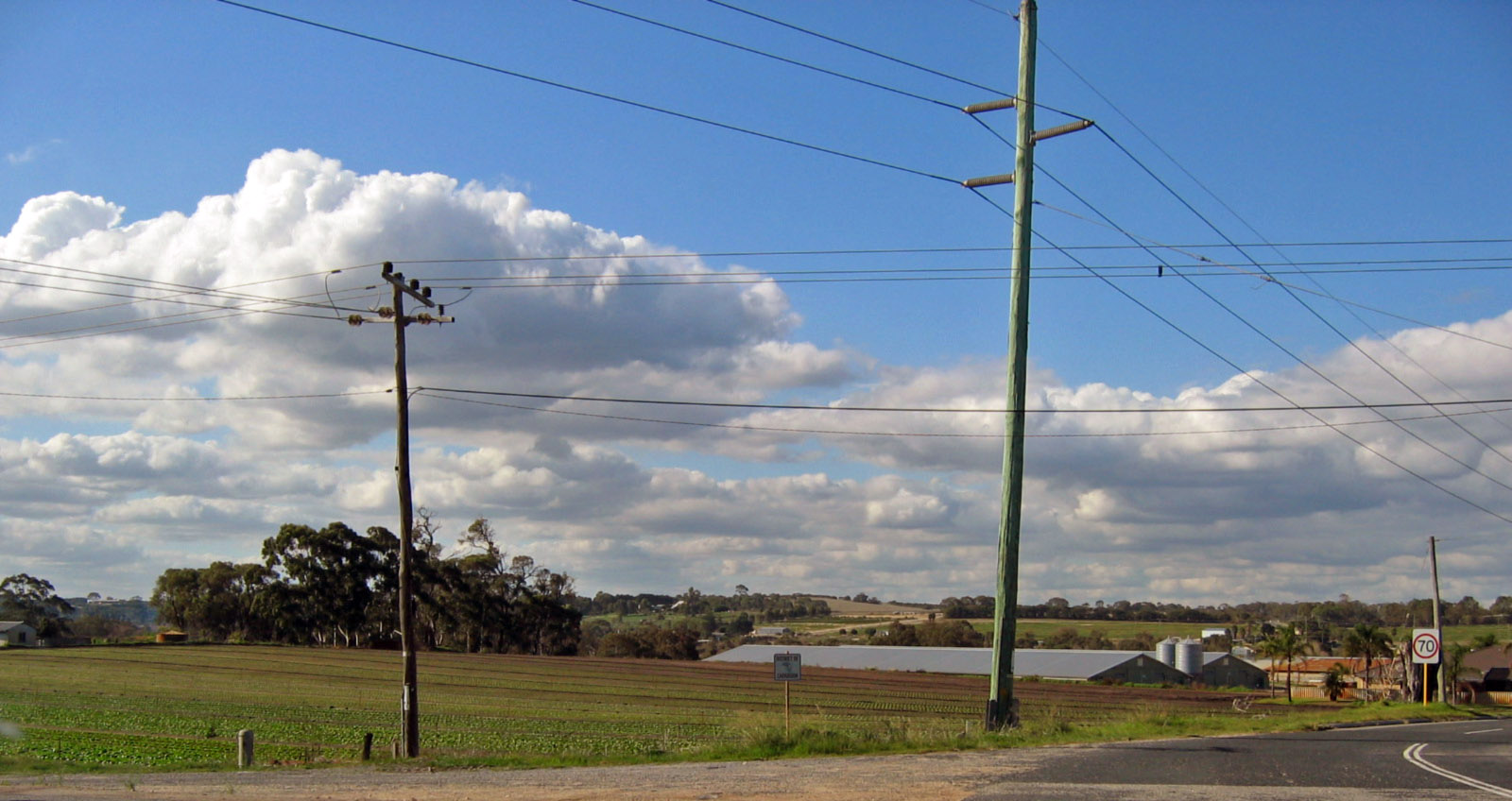
- View from Wanneroo/Karoborup roads
- Interactive map of Carabooda
- Coordinates: 31.595°S 115.713°E
- Country: Australia
- State: Western Australia
- City: Perth
- LGA: City of Wanneroo
- Location: 45 km (28 mi) NNW of Perth CBD

Government
  - State electorate: Mindarie
  - Federal division: Pearce

Area
  - Total: 19.1 km^{2} (7.4 sq mi)

Population
  - Total: 444 (SAL 2021)
- Postcode: 6033
Suburbs around Carabooda
Yanchep	Yanchep	Yanchep
Eglinton	Carabooda	Yanchep
Alkimos	Nowergup	Nowergup

Carabooda is a rural locality in outer northern Perth, Western Australia. Its local government area is the City of Wanneroo.

The region gives its name to a distinctive form of building limestone called Carabooda limestone. An abandoned theme park is located on Karoborup Road - it was known as Dizzy Lamb Park, and specialised in vintage cars and military vehicles until its closure in 2000.

== History ==
The suburb of Carabooda (spelled Karoborup or Karroborup in earlier documents) takes its name from the lake nearby. The lake name was first recorded by J.W. Gregory in January 1843, and is a Noongar word. The current spelling was in use by 1867, and it was approved as a suburb name in 1982. The name "Karoborup" survives in a regional road through the suburb.

== Geography ==
Carabooda is bounded by Romeo Road/Karoborup Road to the south, the proposed Mitchell Freeway to the west, Cutler Road and Old Yanchep Road to the east and Walding Road (near the Yanchep turnoff) to the north.

At the Australian Bureau of Statistics 2011 census, Carabooda had a population of 737 people living in 316 dwellings, an increase of 227 from the 2006 census. Carabooda is a sparsely populated agricultural suburb, and several plant nurseries and wineries and a wildlife park are located in the area.

== Transport ==
Carabooda was served by the Transperth 490 bus route between Clarkson train station and Two Rocks along Wanneroo Road. However, the service was relocated to Marmion Avenue and the nearby suburb of Yanchep on 14 December 2008, and Carabooda is no longer served.

== Politics ==
Carabooda's political leanings are unclear due to its small size and the lack of a polling booth. The nearest large booths tend to favour the Australian Labor Party historically, although most have been won by the Coalition in recent times, especially at federal level.
