= SS Alkimos =

World War II Liberty ship of the United States

Coordinates: 31°36′38″S 115°39′13″E

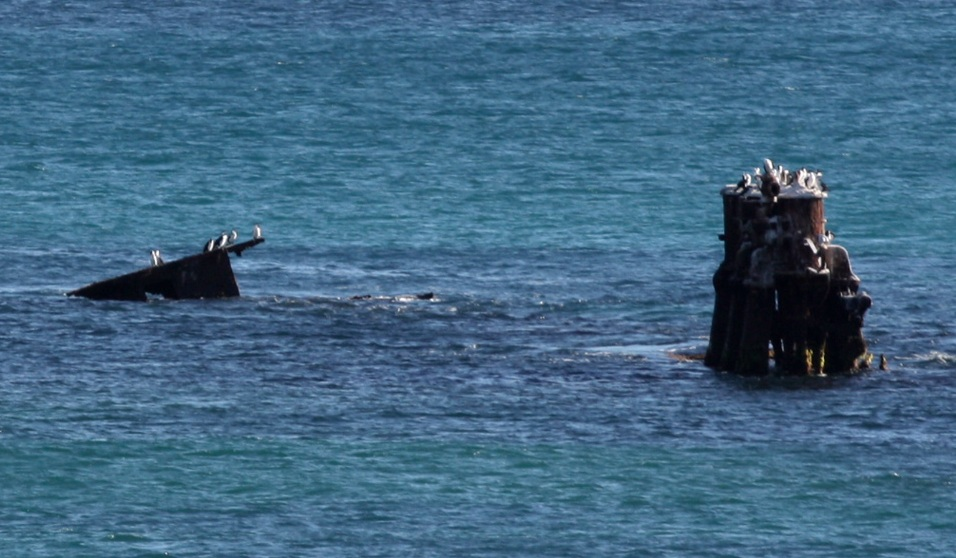
- Alkimos as viewed from the shore, August 2012

History

Norway
- Name: Viggo Hansteen
- Namesake: Viggo Hansteen
- Owner: U.S. War Shipping Administration
- Operator: Nortraship
- Builder: Bethlehem-Fairfield Shipyards Inc., Baltimore
- Laid down: 18 September 1943
- Launched: 11 October 1943
- Acquired: 18 October 1943
- In service: 21 October 1943
- Fate: Sold, 1953

Greece
- Name: Alkimos
- Owner: Alkimos Shipping Company
- Acquired: 1953
- Fate: Wrecked, May 1964

General characteristics (as built)
- Type: Type EC2-S-C1 liberty ship
- Tonnage: 7,176 gross register tons (GRT); 10,865 long tons deadweight (DWT)
- Displacement: 14,245 long tons (14,474 t)
- Length: 441 ft 6 in (134.57 m)
- Beam: 57 ft (17 m)
- Draft: 27 ft 8 in (8.43 m) (full)
- Propulsion: 2 oil-fired boilers; Three cylinder triple expansion steam engine; 2,500 hp (1,864 kW); 1 screw
- Speed: 11 knots (20 km/h; 13 mph)
- Range: 17,000 nmi (31,000 km) at 11 kn (20 km/h; 13 mph)
- Crew: 41

Alkimos was a Greek-owned merchant ship which was wrecked on the coast north of Perth, Western Australia in 1963. A nearby locality was later named after the vessel. The wreck is a popular diving venue.

== History ==
The ship was built during World War II by Bethlehem-Fairfield Shipyards in Baltimore as part of the United States' Liberty ship program and was originally scheduled to be named George M. Shriver. It is said to be haunted after several workers were unintentionally trapped in riveted-up compartments aboard the ship. These unfortunate workers were found a day after, suffocating to their deaths in these sealed areas. It was launched on 11 October 1943. However, on 20 October, the vessel was reassigned to the Norwegian Shipping & Trade Mission, was re-christened Viggo Hansteen. and saw war service for about 18 months, primarily in the Mediterranean and was crewed by mariners of various nationalities. It served as a troopship and transported cargo, in convoys that were sometimes attacked by German aircraft and U-boats.

A murder-suicide took place on board Viggo Hansteen in August 1944, while the ship was at Naples (some sources say Piombino); Canadian radio operator Maude Steane is reported to have been shot by another crew member in his cabin, who then killed himself.

At 2:30 am on 24 April 1952, the Viggo Hansteen while on a voyage from London, via Panama, to Port Chalmers and Wellington with new British cars and bagged cement ran aground two miles northeast of the Katiki Point Lighthouse near Moeraki. The Port Chalmers-based tug Dunedin was dispatched to the scene and by 3:16 pm the tug had refloated the vessel which was only slightly damaged and escorted it to port.

The vessel was sold in 1953 to Greek owned Faros Shipping, of London who renamed it Alkimos, after a word meaning "strong" and a Greek god, Álkimos. The ship operated under the flag of Panama until 1959 when it was transferred to Greek registry.

== Loss ==
The vessel was on a voyage from Jakarta to Bunbury when, on 20 March 1963, it struck a reef off the Beagle Islands, 8 kilometres (5.0 mi) from the Western Australian coast, near Eneabba. It was salvaged and towed to Fremantle, the port city for Perth, Western Australia, where it underwent repairs for two months.

After the settlement of a dispute concerning payment for the repairs, Alkimos left Fremantle under tow by an ocean-going tug, Pacific Reserve from Hong Kong. Only a few hours out of port, on 31 May 1963, the tow line gave way and Alkimos was driven onto the shore. Although the ship remained intact, it could not be floated off at that time, and so it was filled with water to secure it in place and left in the charge of an on-board caretaker.

Another tug, Pacific Star, under command of Captain E. R. Francisco, returned in January 1964 and the ship was refloated on 14 February, but the planned journey to Manila had hardly begun when the tug was seized a week later at sea by authorities and Alkimos was left anchored. On 2 May, the vessel broke anchor and was driven onto the Eglinton Rocks at present-day Alkimos. On this occasion it was more severely damaged, and all thought of salvaging it intact was abandoned.

It was later sold by the owners for scrap. However, in 1969, salvage workers were driven off the wreck by a fire, and each time they returned, the fire started again. After that time, the partly dismantled remains of the ship sat in several metres of water, visible to visitors, before gradually disintegrating.

== Source ==
- The Sunday Times Magazine (Perth), 19 March 2006, p. 14
- ABC Television program Stateline (Transcript) Archived 25 August 2004 at the Wayback Machine
- Shipwrecks of the Wanneroo Coast Archived 19 August 2006 at the Wayback Machine
- Photo of the Alkimos in 1969 Archived 27 July 2011 at the Wayback Machine
