= Yanchep railway station =

Railway station in Yanchep, Western Australia

Yanchep
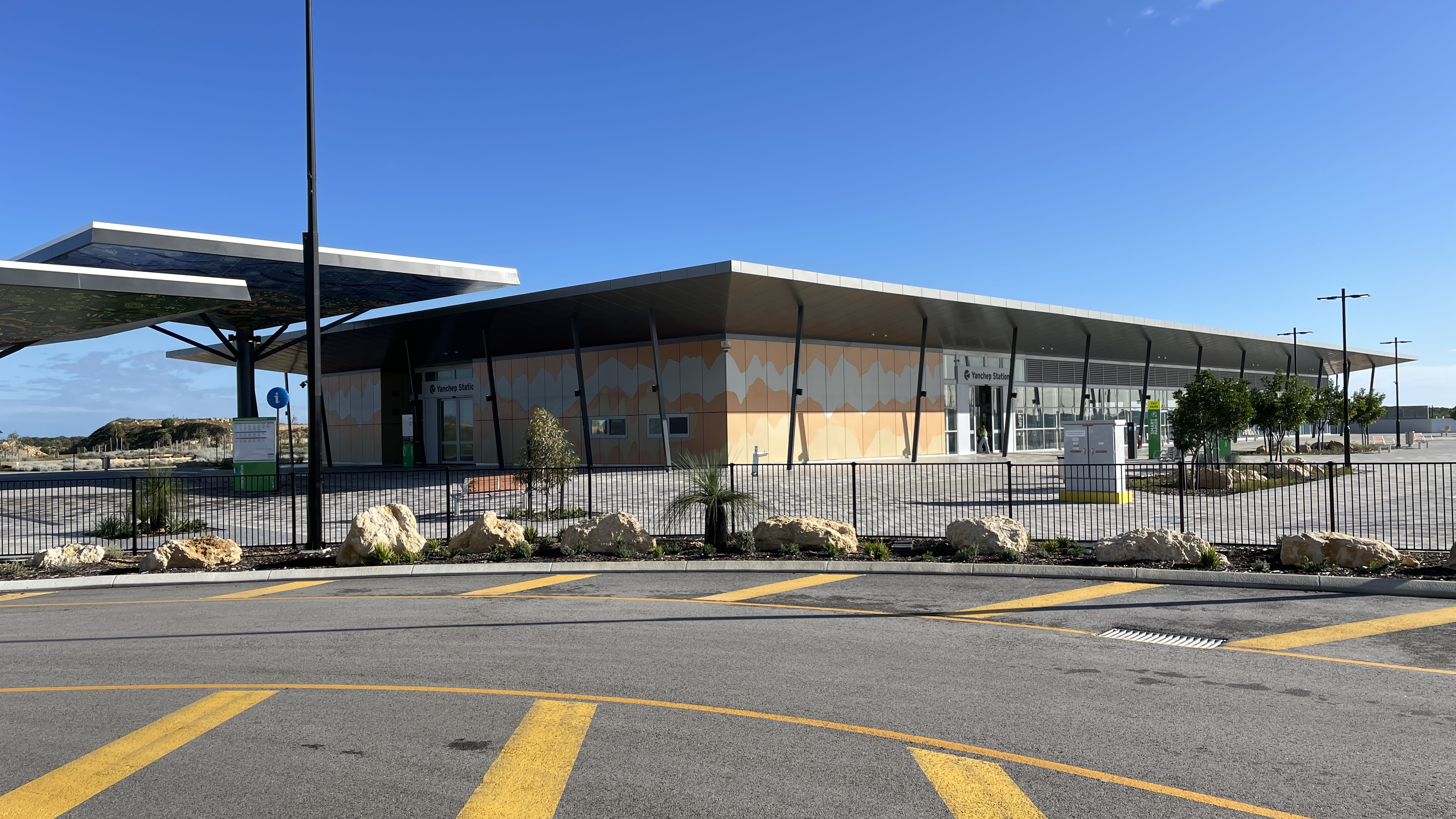
- Station building and entrance, July 2025

General information
- Location: Botanic Boulevard; Yanchep, Western Australia; Australia
- Coordinates: 31°31′55″S 115°38′38″E
- Owner: Public Transport Authority
- Operator: Public Transport Authority
- Line: Yanchep line
- Distance: 54.5 km (33.9 mi) from Perth Underground
- Platforms: 1 side platform and 1 island platform, 3 platform edges total
- Tracks: 3
- Bus stands: 14
- Connections: Bus

Construction
- Structure type: Cutting
- Parking: 923 bays
- Cycle facilities: Yes
- Accessible: Yes

Other information
- Fare zone: 6

History
- Opened: 14 July 2024

Passengers
- Predicted: 11,032 per day in 2031

Services
Preceding station	Transperth	Following station
Eglinton towards Elizabeth Quay via Perth Underground	Yanchep line	Terminus
Location
- Location of Yanchep station

Yanchep railway station is a suburban rail station in Yanchep, a suburb of Perth, Western Australia. The station has been the northern terminus of Transperth's Yanchep line since the station opened on 14 July 2024. It consists of three platforms in a cutting below a ground-level concourse.

Since planning for the Yanchep line, originally known as the Joondalup line, began in the 1980s, it has been planned for the line to eventually be extended to Yanchep. The Yanchep Rail Extension project began in 2017 to extend the Joondalup line by three stations and 14.5 kilometres (9.0 mi) to Yanchep. Construction on the extension began in mid-2020. Originally planned to be completed by the end of 2021, the extension opened on 14 July 2024.

Trains at Yanchep station run at up to a five-minute frequency during peak hour, lowering to a fifteen-minute frequency off-peak and on weekends and public holidays. At night, trains are half-hourly or hourly. The journey to Perth Underground station takes 49 minutes. There are four bus routes that serve the station, which run to Eglinton station to the south and Two Rocks to the north.

== Description ==
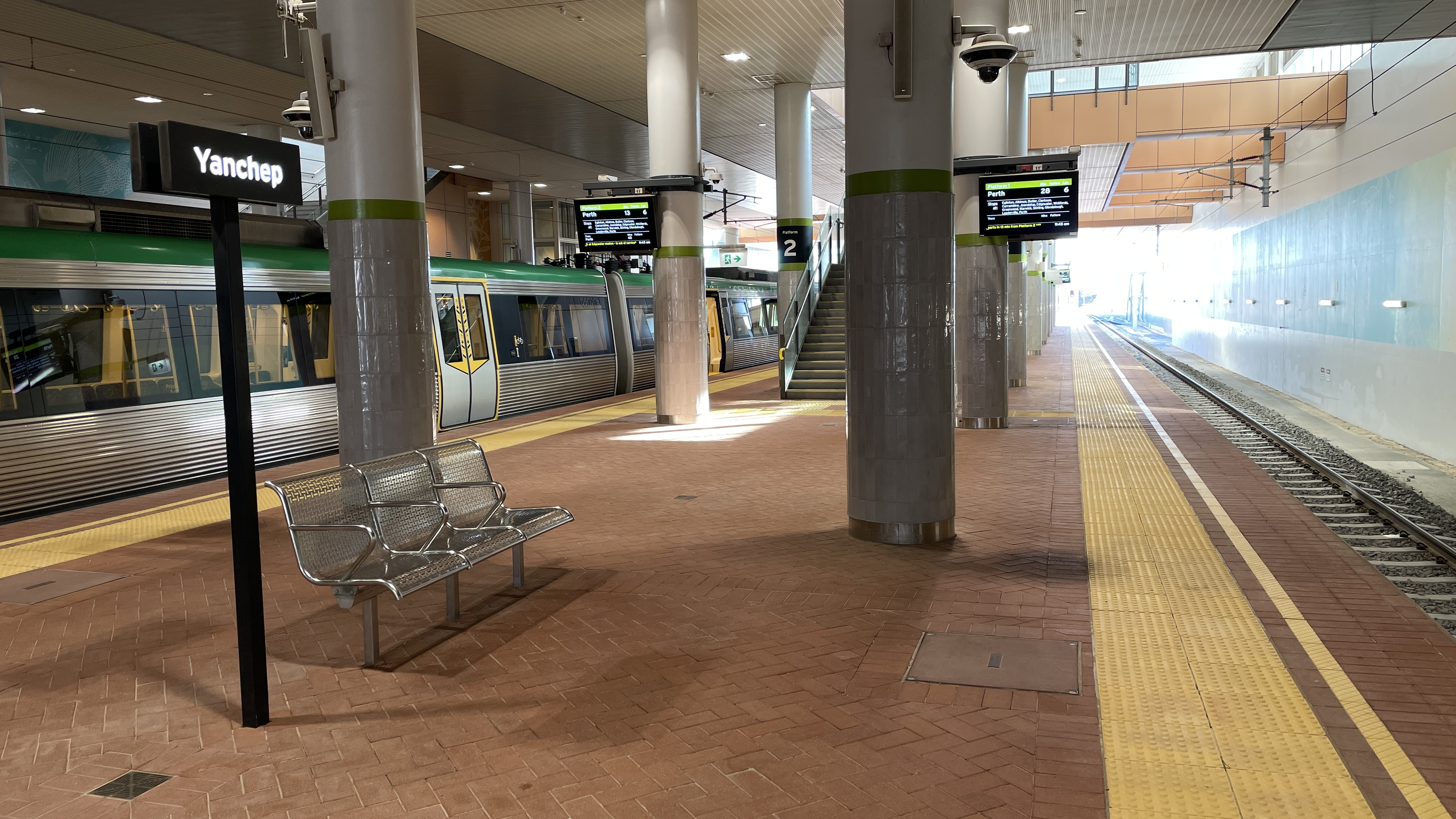
Platform level

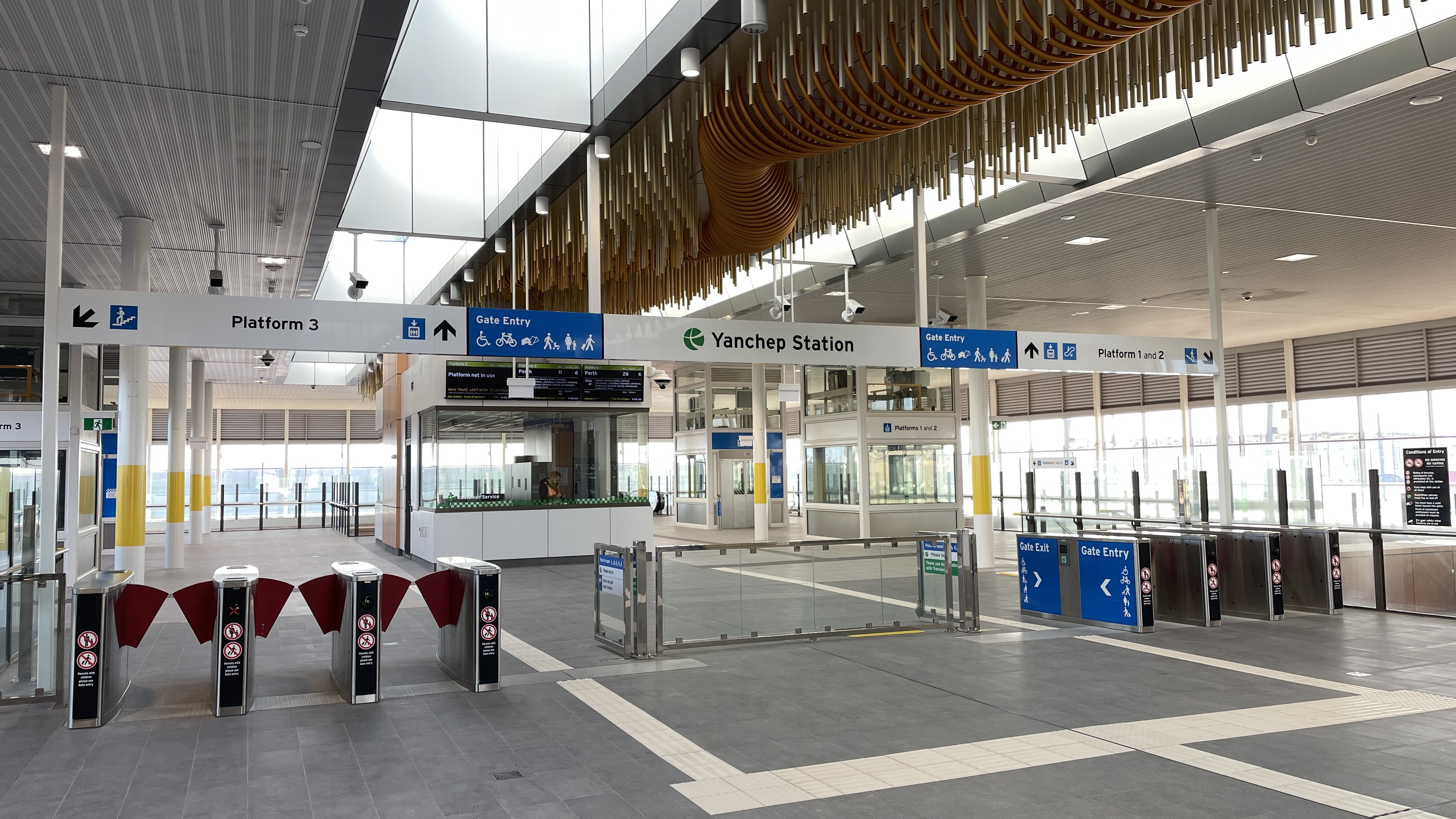
Concourse level

Yanchep station is in Yanchep, a far northern suburb of Perth, Western Australia. The station is 54.5 kilometres (33.9 mi) from Perth Underground station and is in fare zone six. Yanchep station is the northernmost station of the Yanchep line. To the south, the next station is Eglinton station.

Yanchep station consists of one island platform and one side platform, for a total of three platform faces, sunk into a cutting. Each platform is 150 metres (490 ft) long, or long enough for a six-car train. The station was initially planned to have two platform faces with provisions for future expansion to three, but three platform faces ended up being built. The platforms were designed to be in a cutting to improve the pedestrian experience, to lower the impact of noise, and to lower the visual impact. On top of the platforms is a ground-level concourse, connected to the platforms by lifts, stairs and escalators. To the south of the station building and over the tracks is a public forecourt. East of the station is the bus interchange with fourteen stands, and north-east is a car park with 923 bays. Other facilities include a bicycle shelter and toilets. The station is fully accessible.

The land surrounding Yanchep station, which is undeveloped at the time the station was constructed, will be part of the future Yanchep city centre. The land is privately owned by the Yanchep Beach Joint Venture and is intended to become a transit-oriented development. The car park is not located directly adjacent to the station and there is land left between the car park and station for future development, to encourage the use of buses or walking to the station.

=== Public art ===
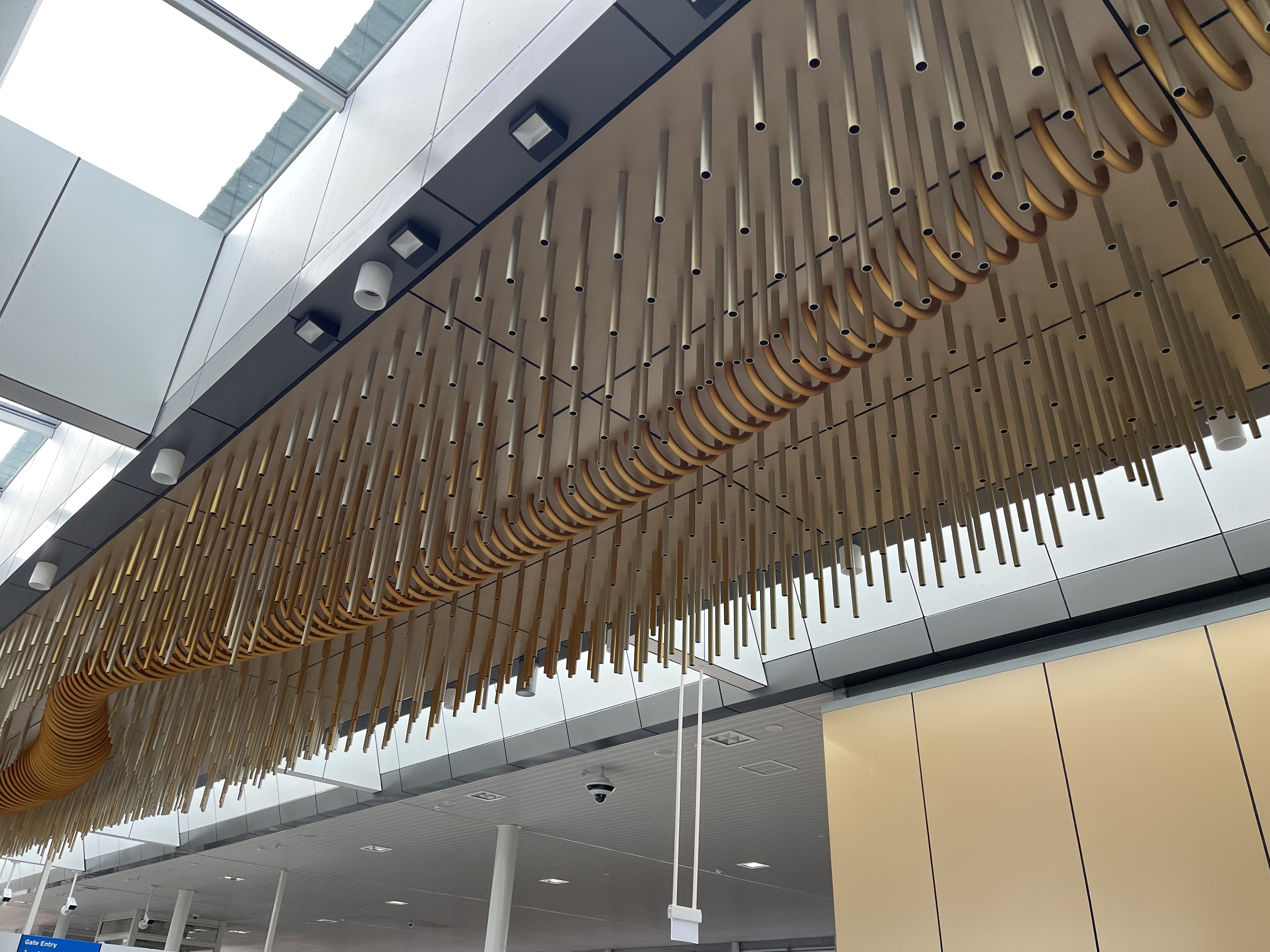
Art piece on the interior ceiling by Penelope Forlano

On the retaining walls at platform level is a painted mural by Jack Bromell, depicting local flora and fauna with poetry interspersed. The mural's colours come from Yanchep's reefs, lagoon, limestone cliffs, Banksia forests, wetlands and tuart trees. On the interior ceiling is an aluminium art piece by Penelope Forlano representing "stalactites and the natural forces shaping the local environment including wetlands, lagoons, and caves". On the underside of the entrance's shade canopies are paintings by Buffie Punch representing native fauna and flora such as bulrushes.

== History ==
The original section of the Yanchep line, formerly known as the Joondalup line, began construction in November 1989. It opened between Perth station and Joondalup station on 20 December 1992 and between Joondalup and Currambine station on 8 August 1993. An extension to Clarkson station opened on 4 October 2004, and an extension to Butler station opened on 21 September 2014. Since planning for the line began in the 1980s, it has been planned to eventually reach Yanchep. In 1995, the state government reached an agreement with Tokyu Corporation for a land swap for the land required for the railway all the way to Two Rocks, including in Yanchep.

Yanchep station was built as part of the Yanchep Rail Extension, which involved the construction of 14.5 kilometres (9.0 mi) of track and two other stations: Alkimos and Eglinton. The Yanchep Rail Extension originated from a commitment by the Labor Party prior to winning the 2017 state election to build the extension as part of its Metronet project. In December 2019, the main contract for the Yanchep Rail Extension and the Thornlie–Cockburn Link was awarded to the NEWest Alliance, a joint venture of CPB Contractors and Downer Group.

The design of Yanchep station was revealed in August 2020. Vegetation clearing and earthworks in Yanchep began in the second half of 2020. In June 2021, PerthNow reported that construction on the Yanchep Rail Extension had "stalled". Foundation works for Yanchep station had begun by the end of 2021. The first priority was building the 150-metre-long (490 ft) concrete retaining walls, which were completed by May 2022. In early April 2023, the Yanchep station deck was poured, in what was the rail extension's largest concrete pour. In September 2023, work that was in progress included paving the platforms and construction of the bus interchange canopies and ceilings and partitions for the platforms and concourse. By March 2024, construction was almost complete, with finishing touches being applied and landscaping being done.

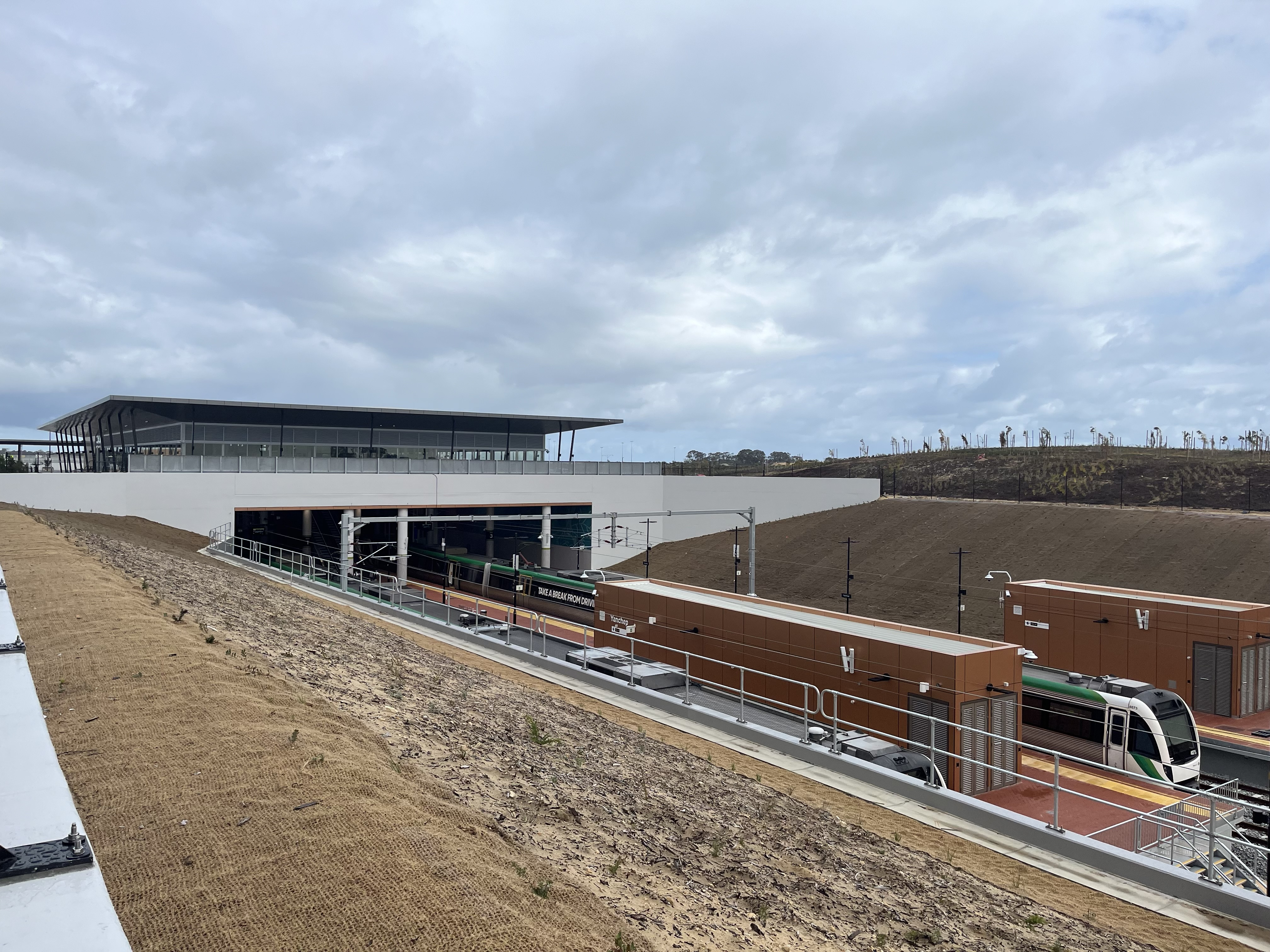
The exterior to Yanchep station

The Yanchep Rail Extension was originally meant to open in late 2021. This was first delayed to 2022 upon the contract being awarded. After the September 2021 state budget, the extension was delayed to late 2023. After the May 2023 state budget, the government said that the Yanchep extension "is due for completion at the end of 2023, with services commencing in the new year". At the end of 2023, the Yanchep extension was still under construction and services were planned to commence in the first half of 2024. The actual opening date was revealed in April 2024. The station was officially opened on 14 July 2024 by Premier Roger Cook and Transport Minister Rita Saffioti. An opening ceremony and celebrations were held at Yanchep station. Upon opening, the Joondalup line was renamed the Yanchep line.

== Services ==
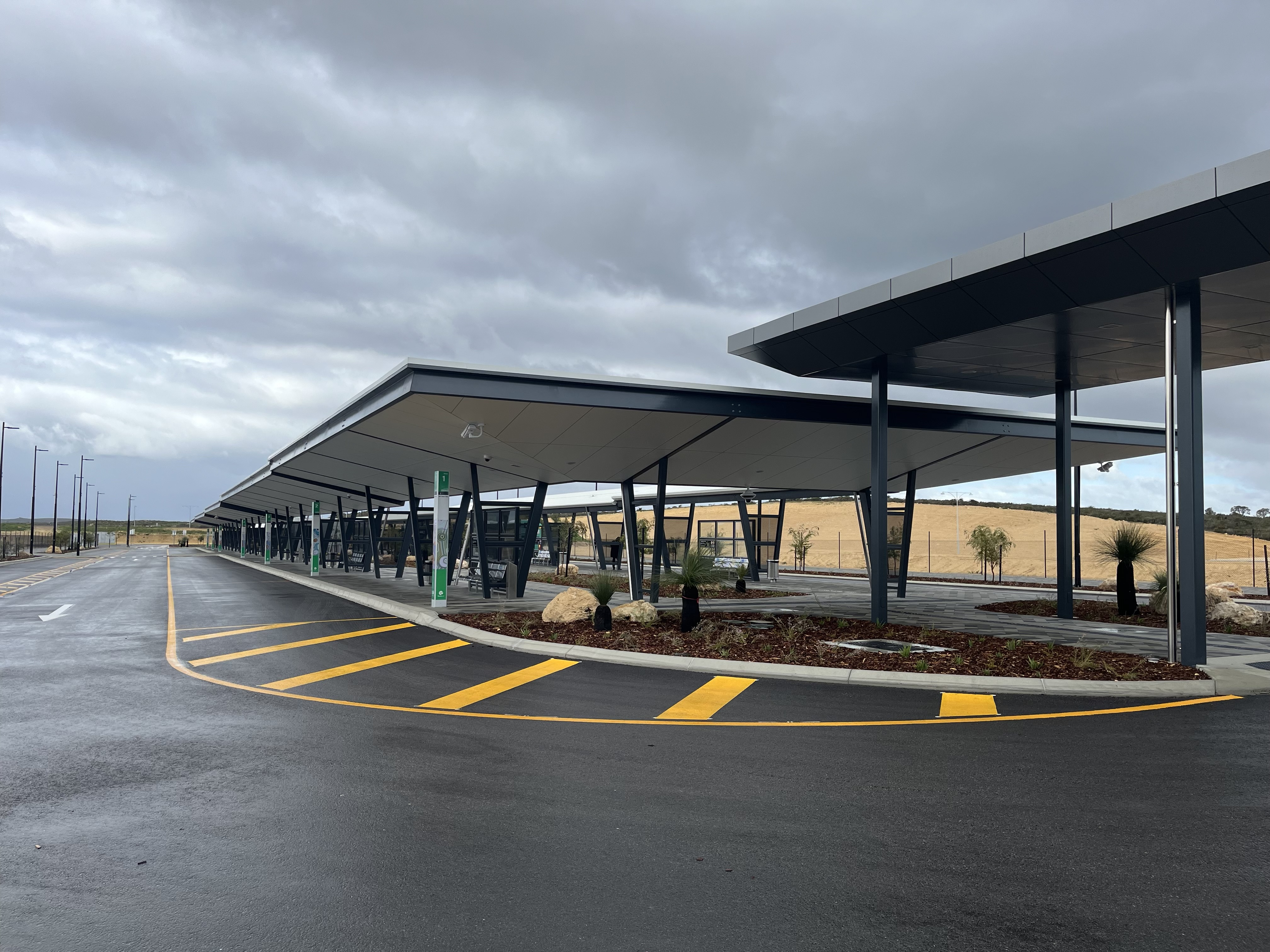
Bus interchange

=== Train services ===
Yanchep is served by the Yanchep line on the Transperth network. Services are operated by the PTA. The line goes between Yanchep and Elizabeth Quay station in the Perth central business district, continuing south from there as the Mandurah line. Peak headways are five to ten minutes, dropping to fifteen minutes outside of peak and on weekends and public holidays. A train journey to Perth takes 49 minutes. It is projected that Yanchep station will have 11,032 daily boardings by 2031.

==== Platforms ====
Yanchep platform arrangement
Stop ID	Platform	Line	Service Pattern	Destination	Via	Notes
99931	1	Yanchep line	All stations	Elizabeth Quay	Perth Underground	
99932	2	Yanchep line	All stations	Elizabeth Quay	Perth Underground	
99933	3	Yanchep line	All stations	Elizabeth Quay	Perth Underground	Typically used only for stadium event services

=== Bus routes ===
The bus interchange has 14 bus stands with four regular bus routes. Routes 494, 495, and 496 run to Eglinton station to the south. Route 498 runs to Two Rocks to the north. Train replacement buses operate as route 904. Because the majority of bus stands are currently not used by any route, all stands currently in use are located at the end of the bus interchange closest to the train station entrance.

==== Bus stands ====
Yanchep bus stand arrangement
Stop ID	Stand	Route	Destination / description	Notes
28962	1		Set-down only	
28963	2		Set-down only	
28964	3	Not currently in use		
28965	4	904	Yanchep line rail-replacement bus services to Perth	
28966 - 28971	5 - 10	Not currently in use		
28972	11	484	Eglinton station Via Wilkie Av and Grey Ct	
28973	12	495	Eglinton station Via Marmion Av and Lagoon Dr	
28974	13	496	Eglinton station Via Yanchep Beach Rd and St Andrews Drive	
28975	14	498	Atlantis Beach Baptist College Via Two Rocks Rd and Gage St	
