= Alkimos railway station =

Railway station in Alkimos, Western Australia

Alkimos
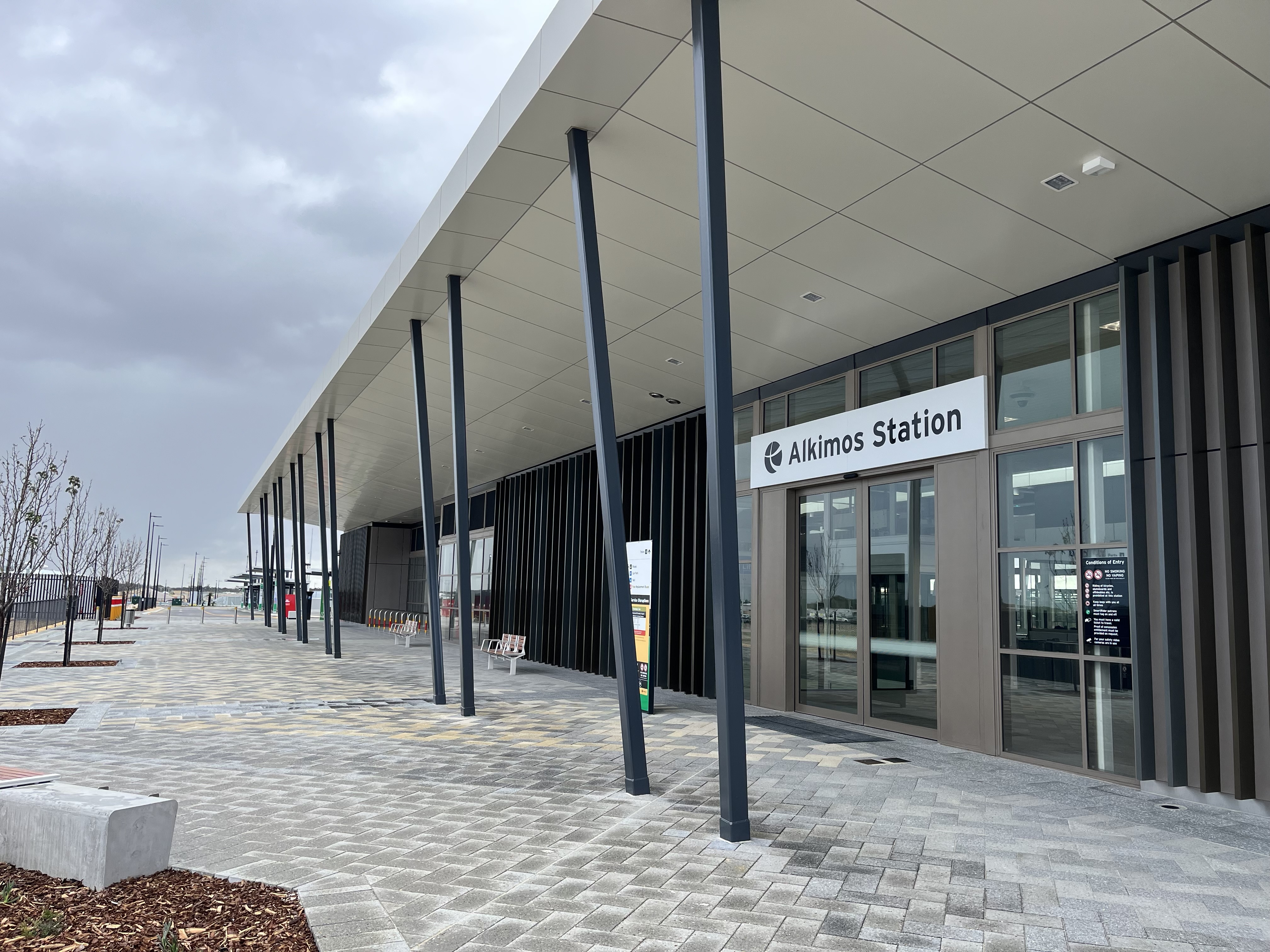
- Station building and entrance, July 2024

General information
- Location: Alkimos, Western Australia; Australia
- Coordinates: 31°36′55″S 115°41′33″E
- Owner: Public Transport Authority
- Operator: Public Transport Authority
- Line: Yanchep line
- Distance: 43.0 km (26.7 mi) from Perth Underground
- Platforms: 2 side platforms
- Tracks: 2
- Bus stands: 8
- Connections: Bus

Construction
- Structure type: Cutting
- Parking: 615 bays
- Cycle facilities: Yes
- Accessible: Yes

Other information
- Fare zone: 5

History
- Opened: 14 July 2024

Passengers
- Predicted: 3,616 per day in 2031

Services
Preceding station	Transperth	Following station
Butler towards Elizabeth Quay via Perth Underground	Yanchep line	Eglinton towards Yanchep
Location
- Location of Alkimos station

Alkimos railway station is a suburban rail station in Alkimos, a suburb of Perth, Western Australia. Situated on Transperth's Yanchep line, the station consists of two side platforms within a cutting below a ground-level concourse, with a bus interchange for feeder bus services.

Since planning for the Yanchep line, originally known as the Joondalup line, began in the 1980s, it has been planned for the line to eventually be extended to Yanchep. The Yanchep Rail Extension project began in 2017 to extend the Joondalup line by three stations and 14.5 kilometres (9.0 mi) to Yanchep, with the first station being Alkimos. Construction on Alkimos station had begun by late 2020. Originally planned to be completed by the end of 2021, Alkimos station and the Yanchep Rail Extension opened on 14 July 2024.

Trains at Alkimos station run at up to a five-minute frequency during peak hour, lowering to a fifteen-minute frequency off-peak and on weekends and public holidays. At night, trains are half-hourly or hourly. The journey to Perth Underground station takes 41 minutes. There are four bus routes that serve the station, which run to Butler station to the south and Eglinton station to the north.

== Description ==
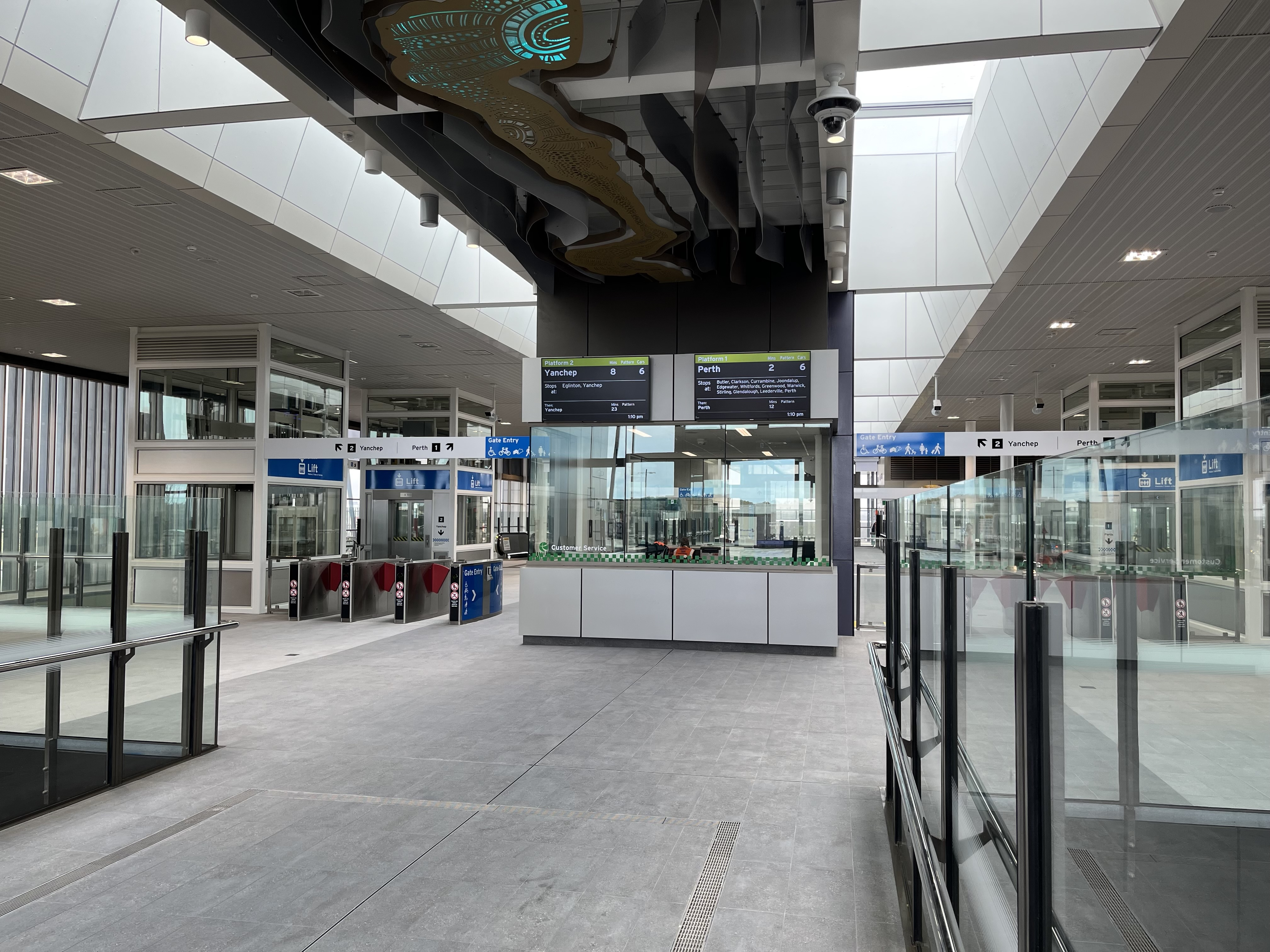
Concourse

Alkimos station is in Alkimos, a suburb of Perth in Western Australia. It is located north of Romeo Road and east of Marmion Avenue in an area that was undeveloped at the time of construction. The station is 43.0 kilometres (26.7 mi) from Perth Underground station and is in fare zone five. The adjacent stations are Butler to the south and Eglinton to the north.

Alkimos station consists of two side platforms sunk into a cutting. On top of the platforms is a large ground-level concourse, which is connected to the platform by a set of lifts, escalators, and stairs. North of the station itself is a bus interchange with eight stands encircling the railway, and further north, two car parks on either side of the railway with 615 bays in total. Other facilities include parking for bicycles and toilets. The station is fully accessible.

Unlike the other stations on the Yanchep Rail Extension, the land surrounding Alkimos station is government owned and will be developed by DevelopmentWA. Alkimos and Eglinton combined are planned to have a population of 60,000 when they are fully developed, and the land around the station, known as Alkimos Central, is planned to become a city centre for the surrounding area, with 15,000 jobs.

=== Public art ===
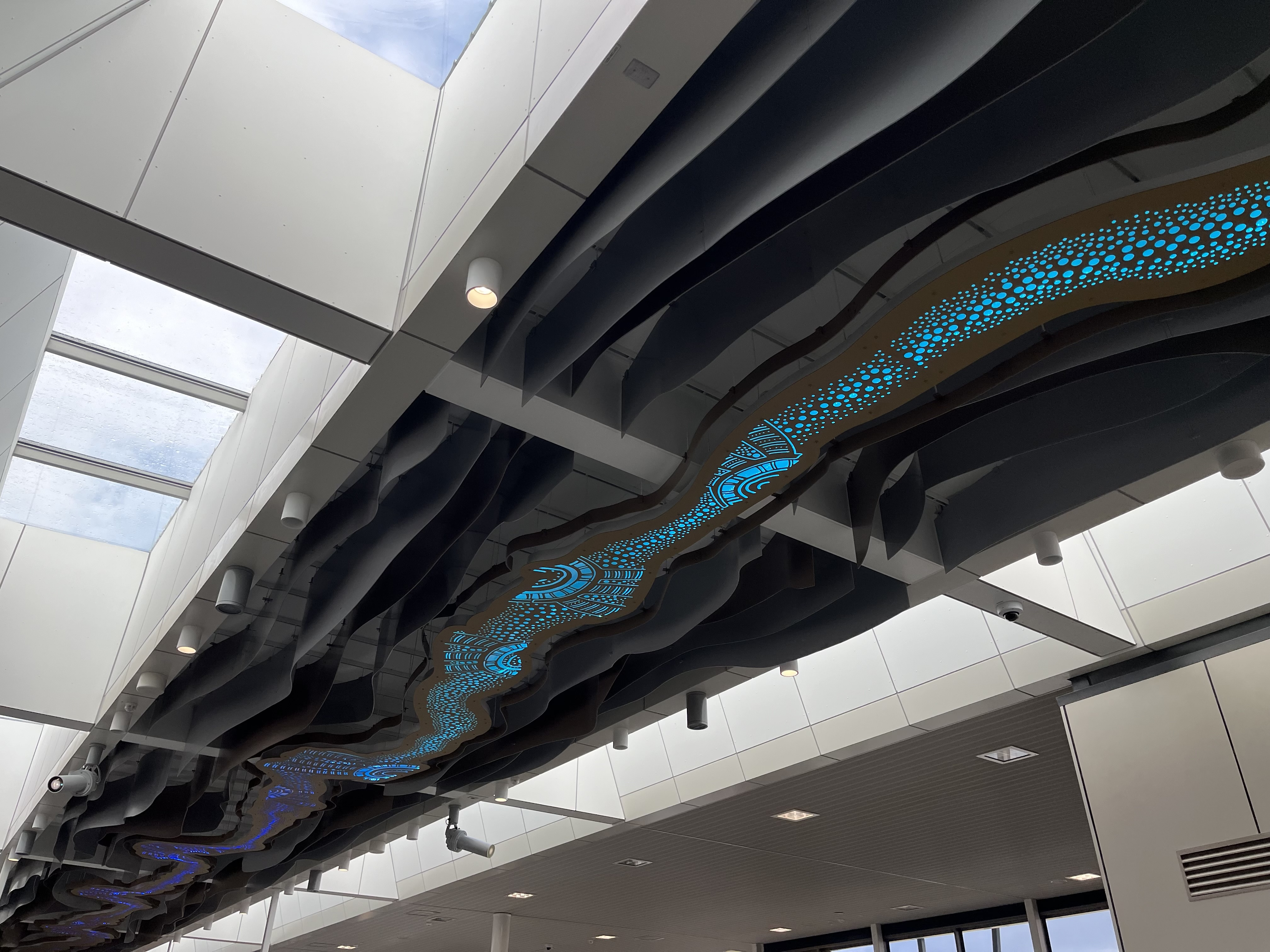
Artwork on the ceiling by Jarni McGuire representing the mythical Rainbow Serpent

On the station's interior concourse is an artwork titled Moon Over Ocean, Land Under Sun, by Caroline Christie-Coxon. This consists of two glazed discs either side of the entryway. On the ceiling is an artwork by Jarni McGuire representing the mythical Rainbow Serpent and inspired by the Melaleuca paperbark tree. On the platform walls is a mural by Chris Nixon using horizontal lines to represent the coastline and waves washing up on the beach.

== History ==
The original stage of the Yanchep line, formerly known as the Joondalup line, began construction in November 1989. It was opened between Perth station and Joondalup station on 20 December 1992, and was extended to Currambine station on 8 August 1993. An extension to Clarkson station opened on 4 October 2004, and an extension to Butler station opened on 21 September 2014. Since planning for the line began in the 1980s, it has been planned to eventually reach Yanchep.

Alkimos station was built as part of the Yanchep Rail Extension, which involved the construction of 14.5 kilometres (9.0 mi) of track and two other stations: Eglinton and Yanchep. The Yanchep Rail Extension originated from a commitment by the Labor Party prior to winning the 2017 state election to build the extension as part of its Metronet project. In December 2019, the main contract for the Yanchep Rail Extension and the Thornlie–Cockburn Link was awarded to the NEWest Alliance, a joint venture of CPB Contractors and Downer Group.

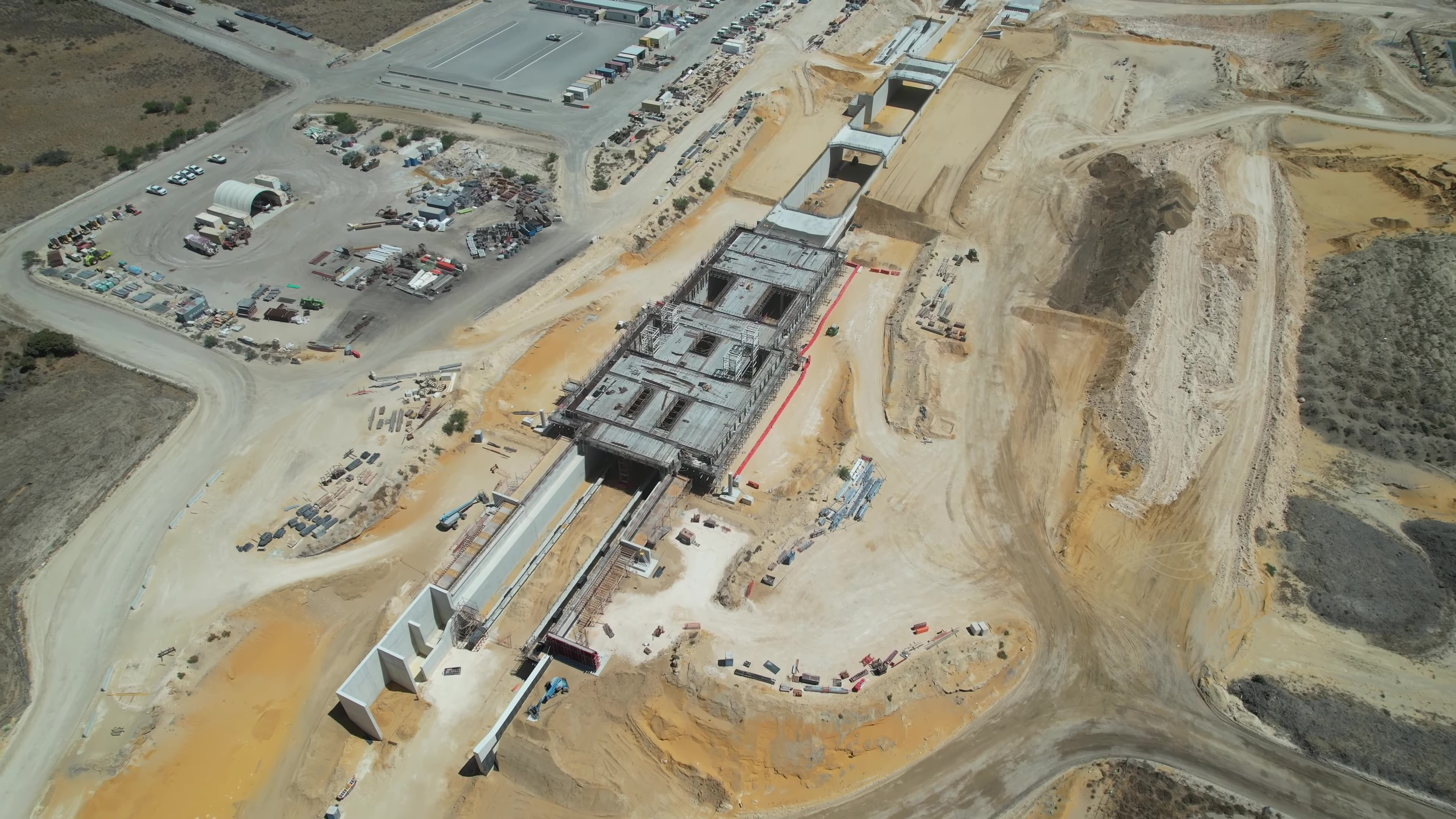
Alkimos station construction viewed from a drone in February 2023

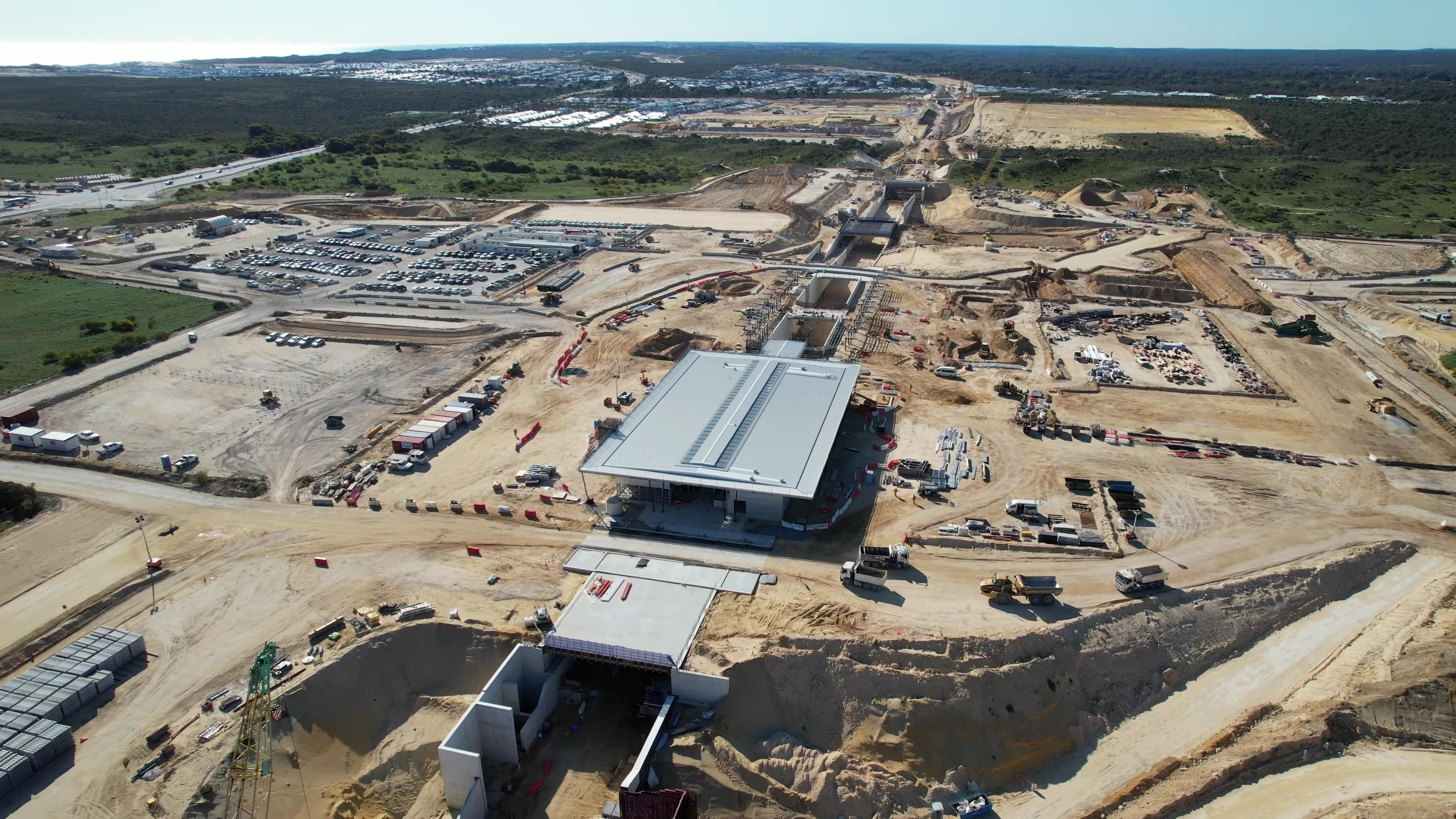
Alkimos station viewed from a drone in August 2023

By the end of 2020, earthworks at Alkimos station had begun. Designs for the station were revealed in August 2020. The first major concrete pour for Alkimos station occurred in March 2021. Following that, it was planned for the concrete retaining walls and bridges to be built. By May 2022, the retaining walls were complete and backfilling was ongoing and by October 2022, construction of the platform and concourse had begun. By March 2023, the concrete slab for the concourse had been completed and installation of the structure steel for the concourse had started. The station's four escalators had been installed by May 2023, and by June 2023, the structural steel was complete and work on the roof was ongoing. In September 2023, work that was in progress included paving the platforms, lift car installation, and construction of the bus interchange canopies and ceilings and partitions for the platforms and concourse. By March 2024, the station's structure was complete and internal fittings and furniture was being installed. Landscaping was underway and the public art pieces were being installed.

The Yanchep Rail Extension was originally meant to open in late 2021. This was first delayed to 2022. After the September 2021 state budget, the extension was delayed to late 2023. After the May 2023 state budget, the government said that the Yanchep extension "is due for completion at the end of 2023, with services commencing in the new year". At the end of 2023, the Yanchep extension was still under construction and services were planned to commence in the first half of 2024. The actual opening date was revealed in April 2024. The Yanchep Rail Extension and Alkimos station opened on 14 July 2024, upon which the Joondalup line was renamed the Yanchep line.

== Services ==
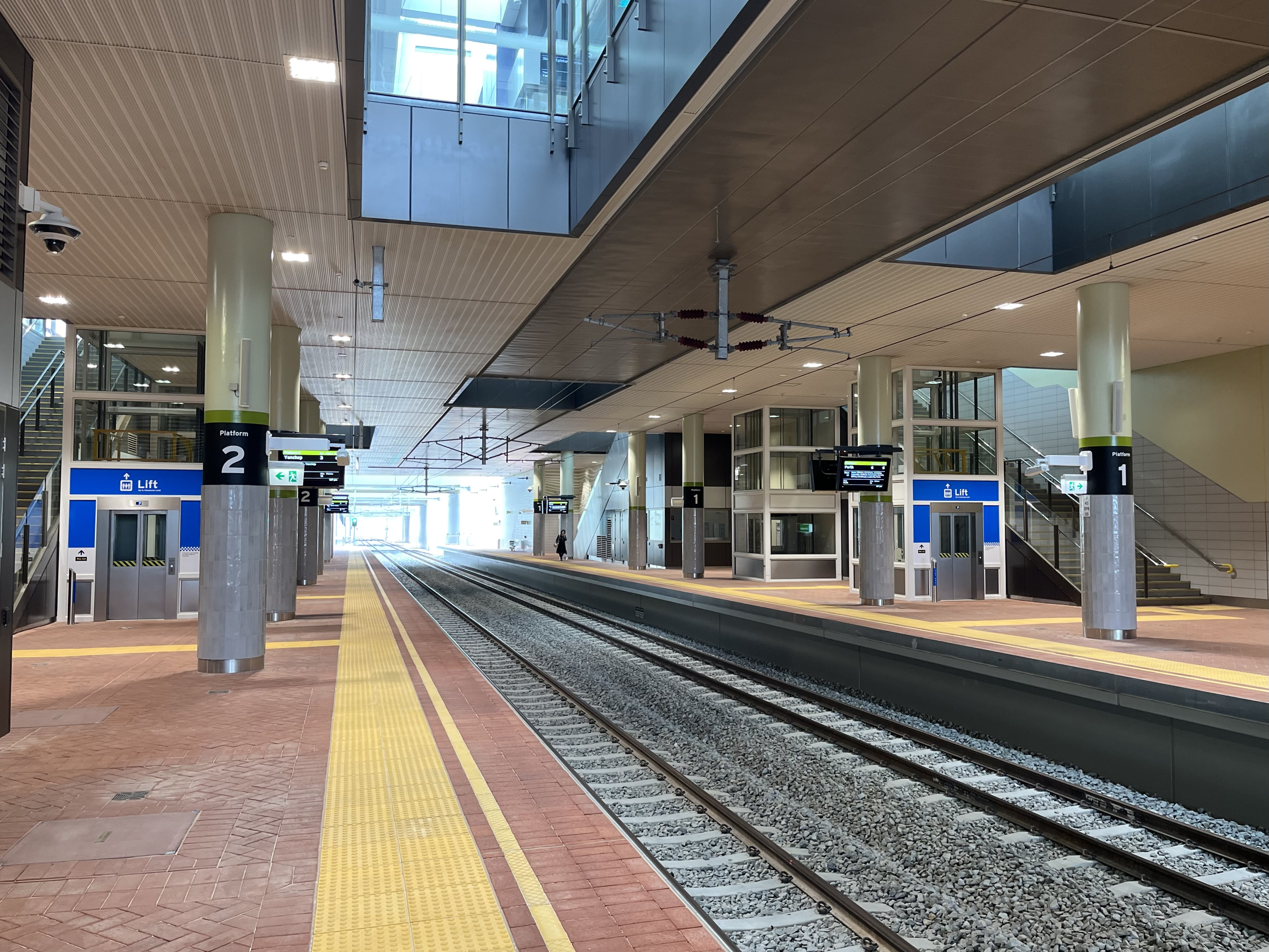
Platforms

=== Train services ===
Alkimos station is served by the Yanchep line on the Transperth network. Services are operated by the PTA. The line goes between Yanchep and Elizabeth Quay station in the Perth central business district, continuing south from there as the Mandurah line. Peak headways are five to ten minutes, dropping to fifteen minutes outside of peak and on weekends and public holidays. A train journey from Alkimos to Perth takes 41 minutes. It is projected that Alkimos station will have 3,616 boardings per day by 2031.

==== Platforms ====
Alkimos platform arrangement
Stop ID	Platform	Line	Service Pattern	Destination	Via	Notes
99911	1	Yanchep line	All stations	Elizabeth Quay	Perth Underground	
99912	2	Yanchep line	All stations	Yanchep		

=== Bus routes ===
The Alkimos station bus interchange has eight bus stands and four regular bus routes. Routes 485 and 486 run to Butler station to the south. Routes 491 and 492 run to Eglinton station to the north. Train replacement buses operate as route 904. The number of bus routes is planned to significantly expand as the population of the surrounding area expands.
