= Leederville railway station =

Railway station in Perth, Western Australia

Leederville
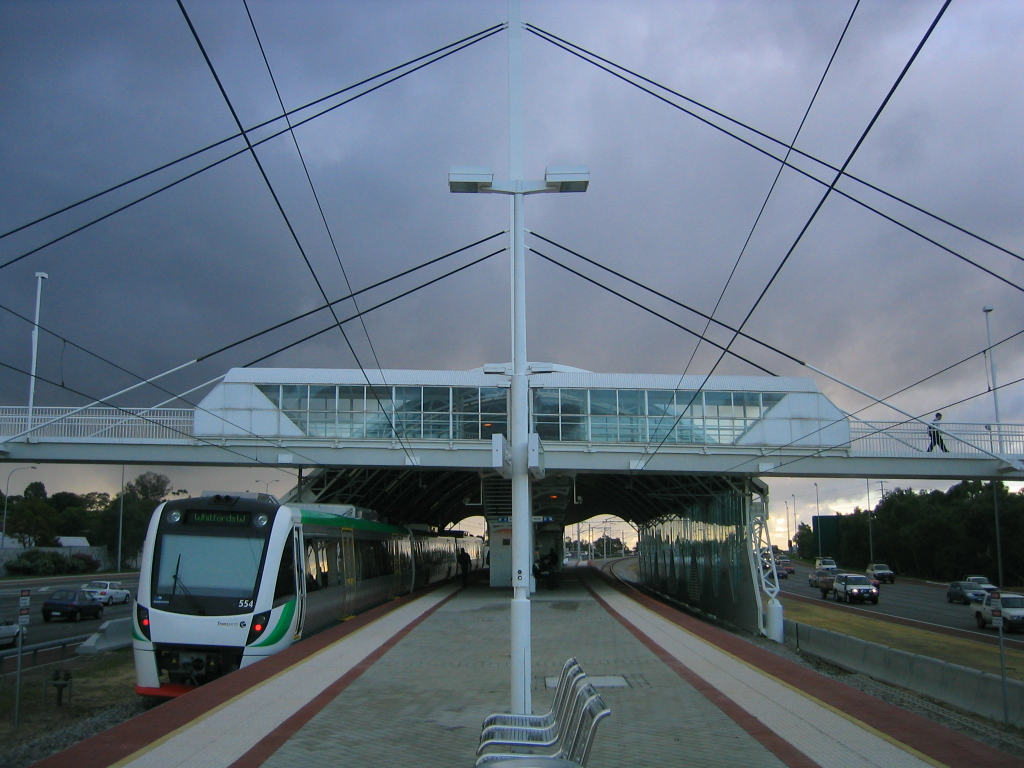
- Southbound view from the island station platform, August 2005

General information
- Location: Mitchell Freeway, Leederville / West Leederville; Western Australia; Australia
- Coordinates: 31°56′20″S 115°50′25″E
- Owner: Public Transport Authority
- Operator: Public Transport Authority
- Line: Yanchep line
- Distance: 2.4 km (1.5 mi) from Perth Underground
- Platforms: 1 island platform with 2 platform edges
- Tracks: 2
- Bus routes: 2
- Bus stands: 3

Construction
- Parking: None
- Accessible: Partial

Other information
- Fare zone: 1

History
- Opened: 20 December 1992

Passengers
- March 2018: 2,700 per day

Services
Preceding station	Transperth	Following station
Perth Underground towards Elizabeth Quay	Yanchep line All, K, W	Glendalough towards Whitfords, Clarkson or Yanchep
Location
- Location of Leederville station

Leederville railway station is a suburban railway station on the boundary of Leederville and West Leederville, suburbs of Perth, Western Australia. The station is on the Yanchep line and is part of the Transperth network. Located within the median strip of the Mitchell Freeway, Leederville station consists of an island platform connected to either side of the freeway by a footbridge.

The initial master plan for the Yanchep line (then known as the Joondalup line or Northern Suburbs Railway) gave provisions for Leederville station but stated it would not be constructed at first. The station was later added to the construction program to offset complaints from local residents about a widening of the Mitchell Freeway. The station opened to limited service on 20 December 1992 as one of three initial stations on the line. The remaining stations opened the following year and on 21 March 1993, full service on the Joondalup line commenced. The station has had minor upgrades since, with the platforms being extended in 2004 and a bus interchange opening in 2013.

Trains at Leederville station run at a five-minute frequency during peak hour, lowering to a fifteen-minute frequency off-peak and on weekends and public holidays. At night, trains are half-hourly or hourly. The journey to Perth Underground station takes three minutes. There are two bus routes that serve the station, including the Green CAT route.

== Description ==
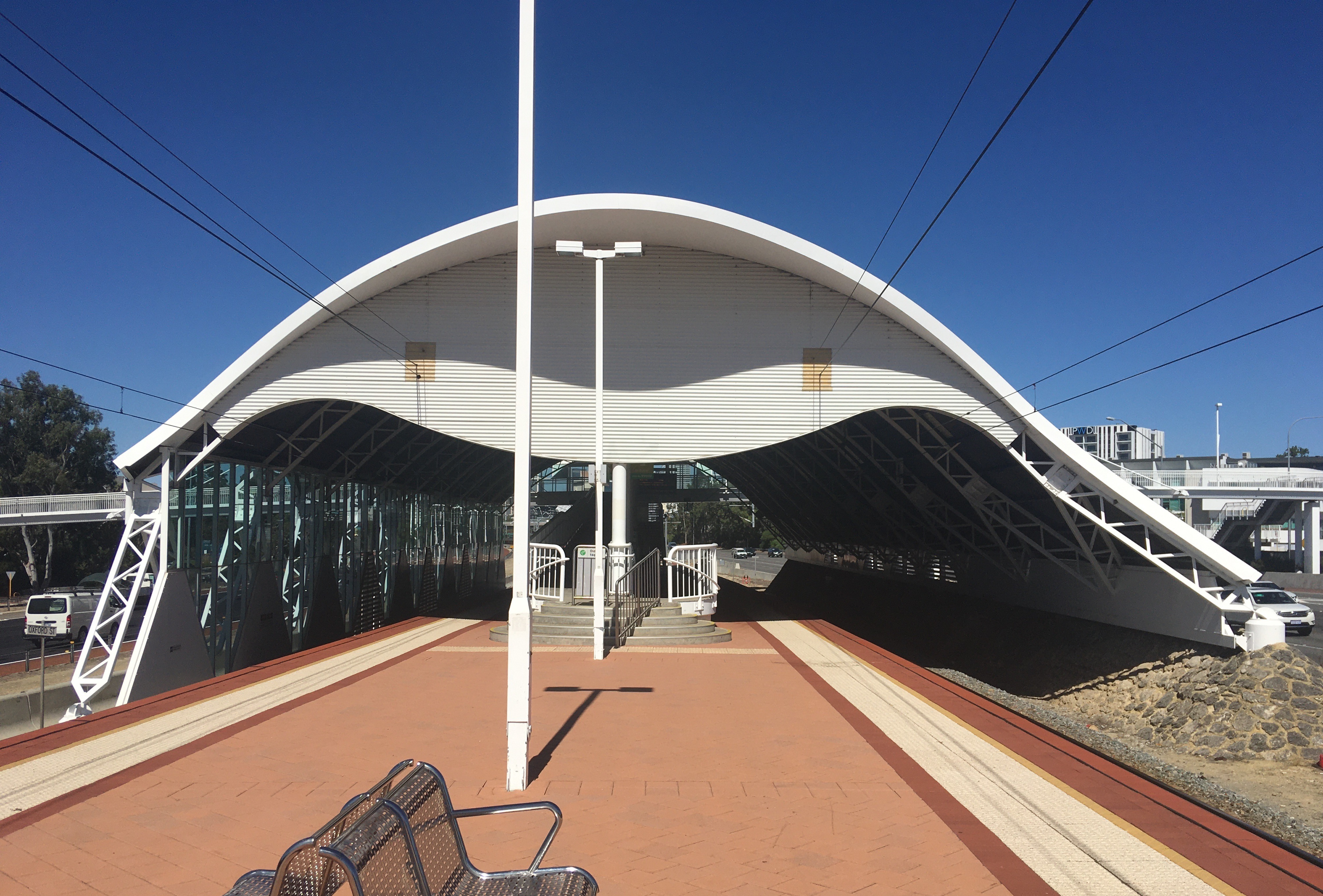
Leederville station viewed from the north

Leederville station is on the border of Leederville to the north-east and West Leederville to the south-west, which are suburbs of Perth, Western Australia. The station is within the median strip of the Mitchell Freeway and on the Yanchep line (formerly known as the Joondalup line), which is part of the Transperth system and is owned by the Public Transport Authority, a state government agency. The next stations are Perth Underground to the south-east and Glendalough to the north. Leederville station is 2.4 kilometres (1.5 mi) from Perth Underground station and is in fare zone one.

Leederville station consists of an island platform, connected to both sides of the freeway via a footbridge. The footbridge is connected to the platform via a set of stairs and a ramp. On the south-western side is a bus interchange with three bus stands. There is no parking at Leederville station, but nearby public carparks are used by some commuters. Due to the steepness of the ramp and a platform gap on the southbound platform, Leederville station is not fully accessible.

To the north-east of the station is the Leederville town centre, along Oxford Street. Other places nearby are Leederville Oval, the School of Isolated and Distance Education, Water Corporation headquarters, North Metropolitan TAFE's Leederville campus, the City of Vincent civic centre, and the Loftus Recreation Centre.

== History ==
During initial planning for the Joondalup line in the 1980s, a station at Oxford Street in Leederville was considered. It was forecast that there would be low demand for the station, but that it could become viable as more offices in West Perth were built in the future, with bus services to link there. The Northern Suburbs Transit System Master Plan, released in November 1989, decided that a station there would not be built initially and that provisions would be put in place for the station's construction in the future. The master plan also said that the Mitchell Freeway would need to be duplicated to the west between Loftus Street and Hutton Street as that section of the freeway was originally constructed as a single carriageway with a dividing barrier, making no room for the railway.

The expansion of the freeway encountered local resistance, with residents opposed to the impact on Lake Monger and Leederville, which had already been divided when the freeway was constructed in the 1970s. State Premier Carmen Lawrence announced in July 1990 that Murdoch University professor Peter Newman would undertake a review of the scheme. Newman said that it was unfair for Leederville residents to put up with the freeway widening without getting a railway station. His report recommended that the expansion be scaled down from five lanes in each direction to four, and for Leederville station to be built with the rest of the Northern Suburbs Railway. The government accepted those recommendations.

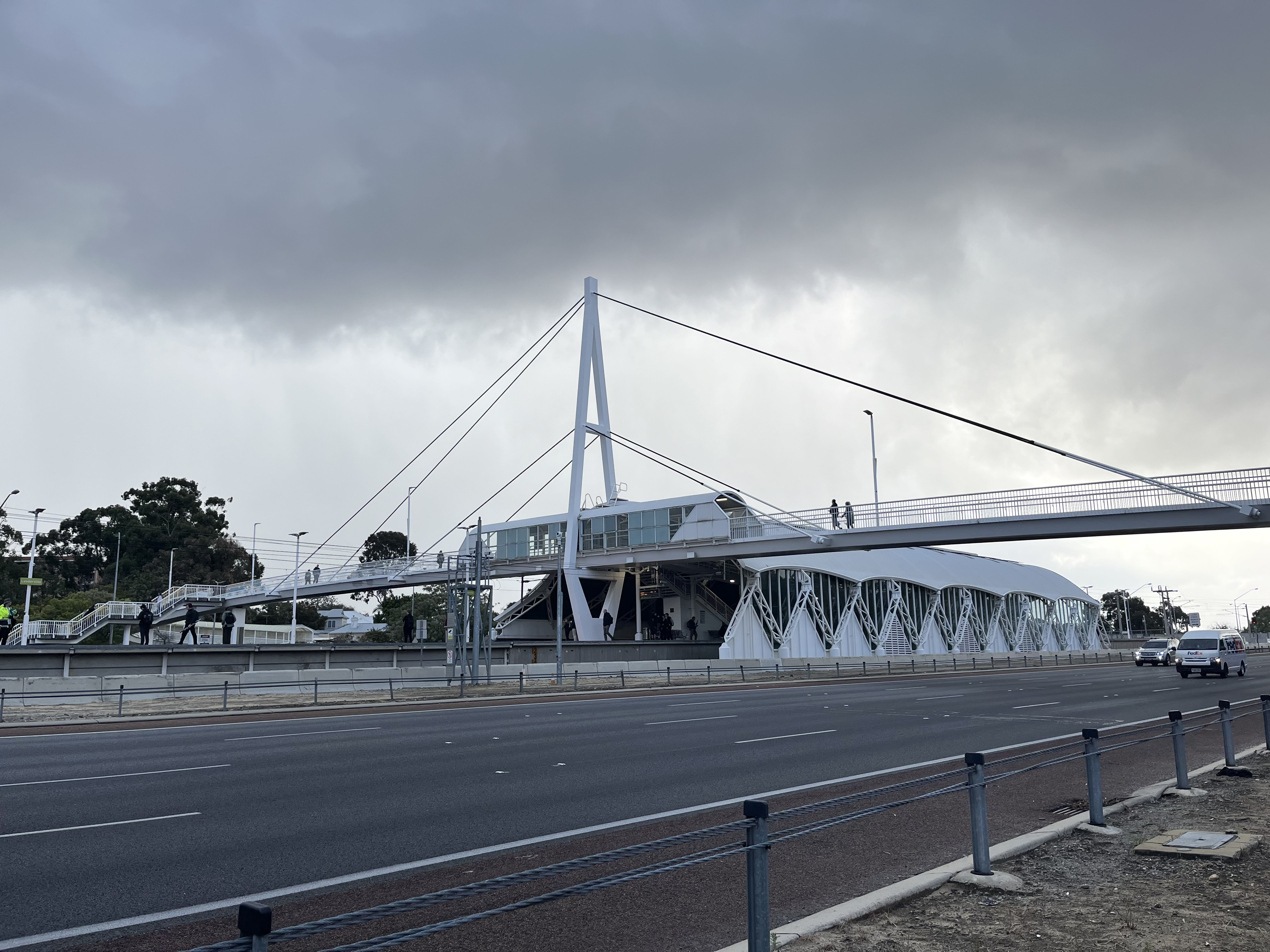
Oxford Street footbridge, which is the only access to Leederville station

Leederville station was designed by Westrail, the state's rail operator. The freeway roadworks were done in-house by the Main Roads Department. The new northbound Mitchell Freeway carriageway opened on 21 June 1992, after eighteen months of construction. By the middle of 1992, the station's platform had reached completion. Due to the freeway duplication, the existing footbridge at Oxford Street had to be replaced, as it was not long enough. The new footbridge, a cable-stayed bridge which is the only access to Leederville station, was constructed alongside two other bridges elsewhere under a $5.3 million contract by Leighton Contractors. The bridge opened in September 1992. By July 1992, a $1 million contract for the construction of Leederville station had been awarded to John Holland Constructions. John Holland won an award at the state Master Builders Association's Excellence in Construction Awards in 1993 for the company's work on Leederville station.

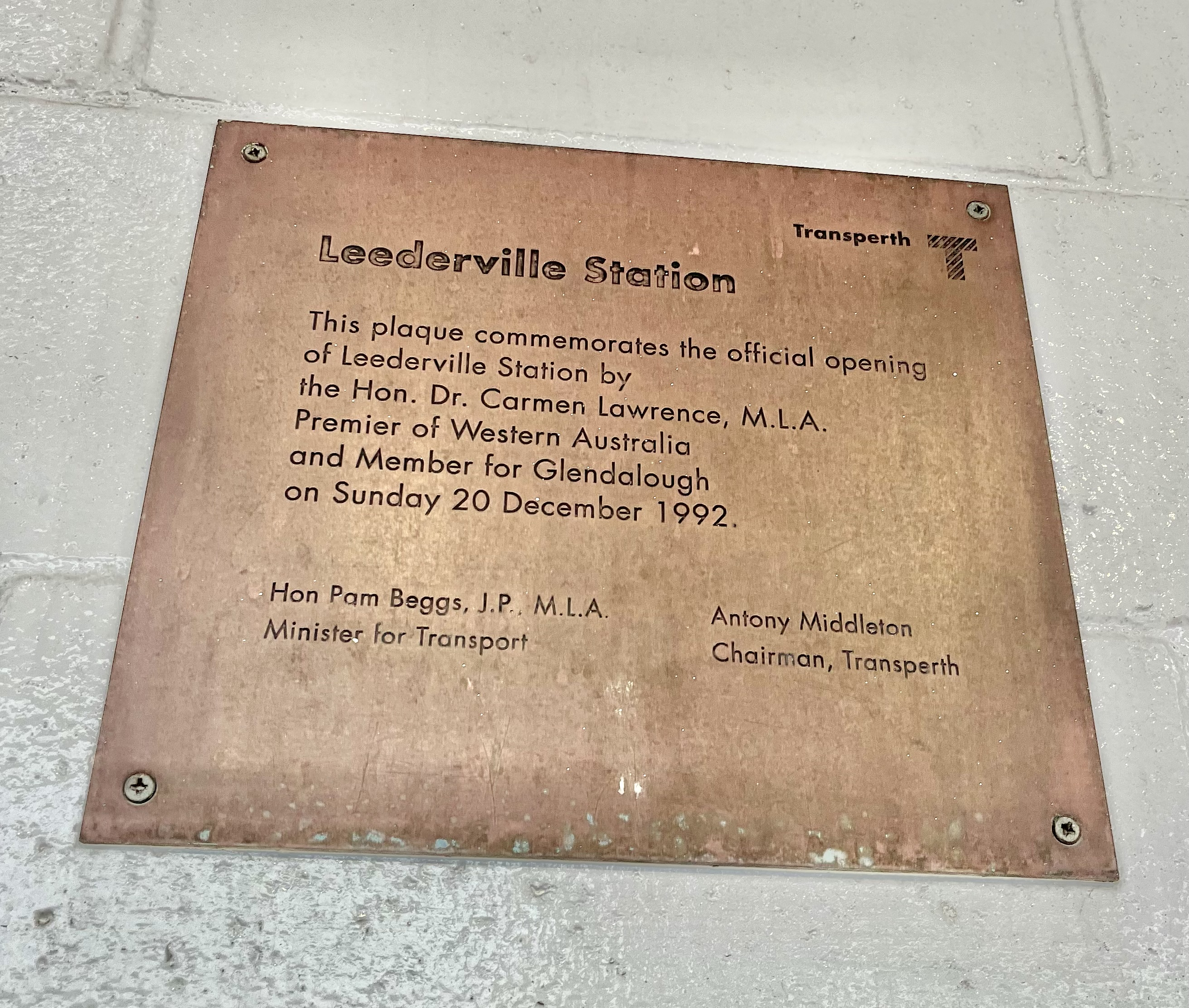
Plaque commemorating the opening of Leederville station on 20 December 1992

Leederville station opened on 20 December 1992 as one of three initial stations on the Joondalup line, alongside Edgewater and Joondalup stations. From 21 December, train services ran under a limited service "discoveride" brand, meaning that train services had a limited frequency of every half-an-hour and only operated between 9:30 am and 2:30 pm. Full service commenced on 21 March 1993, which included peak hour services for the first time and an off-peak frequency increase.

=== Later upgrades ===
In 2003, the contract for extending the platforms on seven Joondalup line stations, including Leederville station, was awarded to Lakis Constructions for $4.8 million. The platforms on these stations had to be extended by 50 metres (160 ft) to accommodate 150-metre-long (490 ft) six-car trains, which were planned to enter service as part of the extension to Clarkson station and construction of the Mandurah line. The platform edges were also upgraded to bring them into line with tactile paving standards. The project began with the extension of Leederville station, and work there was completed by April 2004.

In 2011–12, a turnback siding was built south of Leederville station, allowing trains to reverse at Leederville during disruptions instead of Stirling station as was done previously.

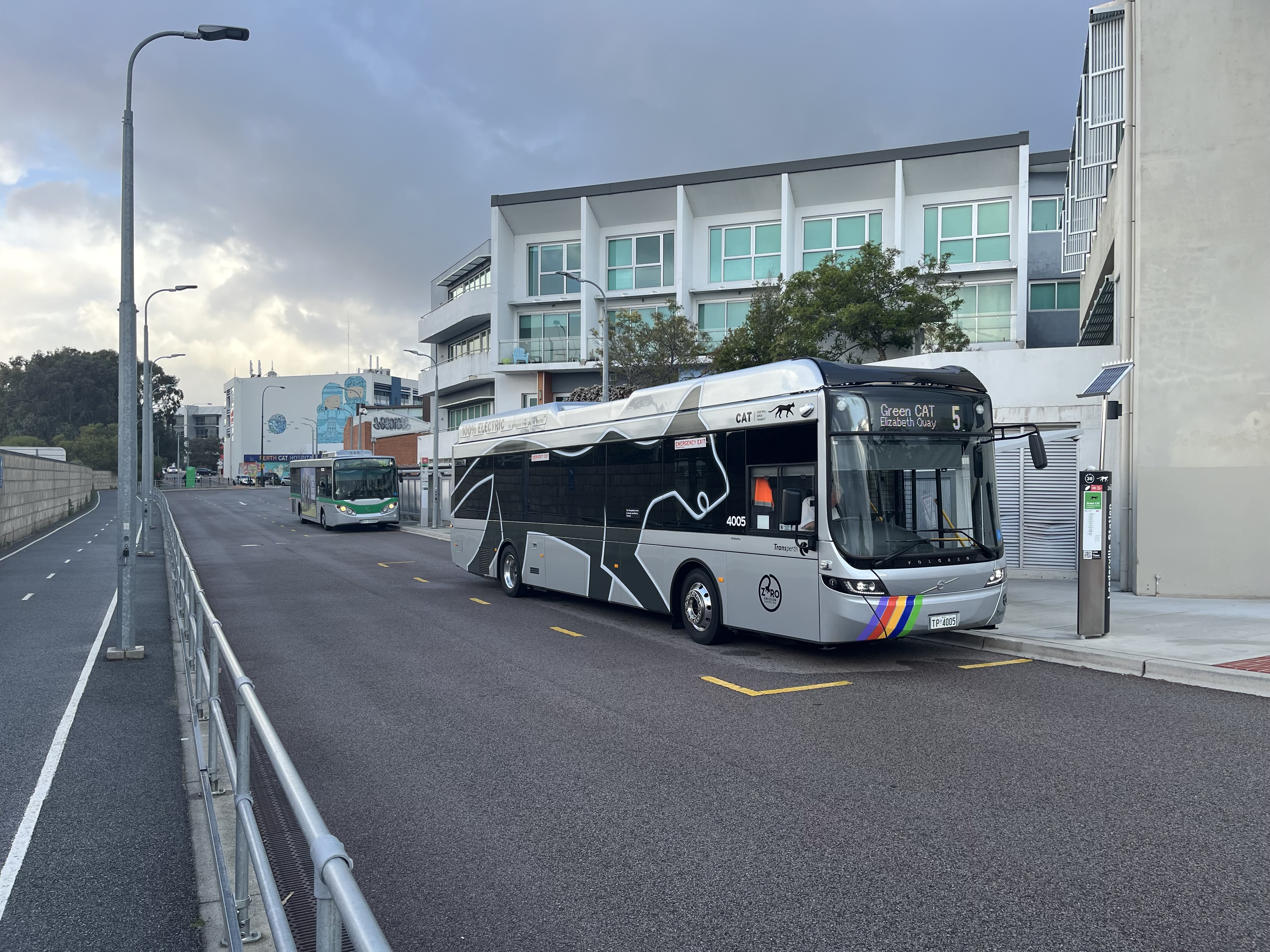
Leederville station bus interchange, with a Green CAT bus parked

A new Green CAT bus route from Leederville station to Esplanade Busport was announced in April 2012. The Green CAT was the fourth Central Area Transit route and is free to use and funded by the Perth Parking Management Account. A bus interchange on the western side of the freeway was constructed from March to June 2013. The Green CAT service commenced on 1 July 2013, "fast-tracked" so that it could open before two five-day shutdowns of the Joondalup line from Leederville to Perth Underground during July and August 2013 for the Perth City Link.

== Proposals ==
In 2011, the City of Vincent and Town of Cambridge, the two local government areas on each side of the Mitchell Freeway, proposed the "Leederville station link", which was an upgrade to the access to Leederville station. The present footbridge is not sheltered and does not have an inviting entrance. The options considered included a pedestrian deck or a viaduct bridge to improve the connection across the freeway and to Leederville station. In 2024, City of Vincent Mayor Alison Xamon and Town of Cambridge Mayor Gary Mack called on the state government to upgrade Leederville station, saying it is "holding up the revitalisation of the surrounding precinct". Xamon said that disability access is poor.

== Services ==
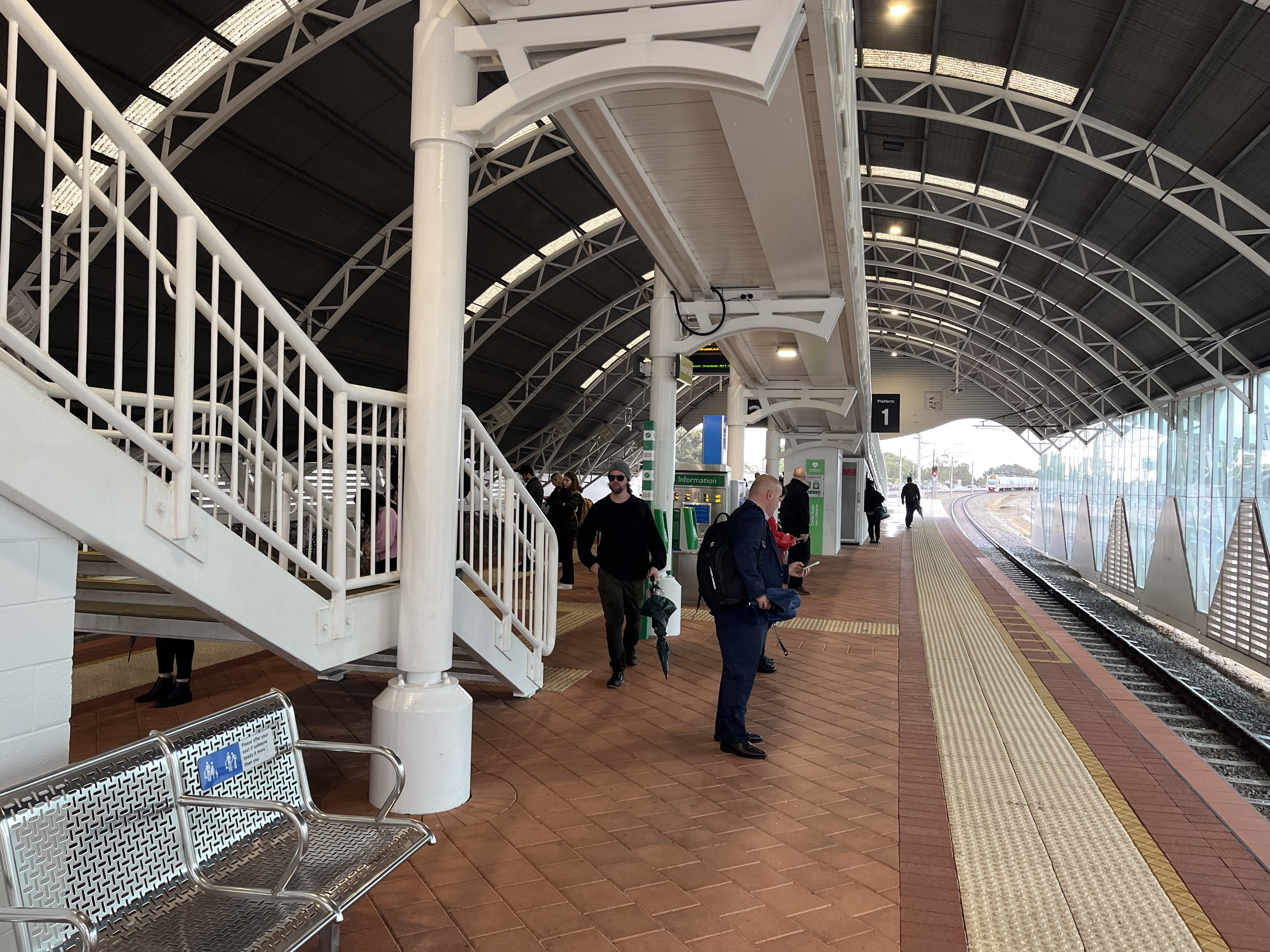
Under the shelter at Leederville station

Leederville station is served by Yanchep line trains, which travel from Yanchep station in the north to Elizabeth Quay station in the south, continuing south from there on the Mandurah line. These services are operated by the Public Transport Authority.

During peak hour, trains stop at Leederville station every five minutes, with some services terminating or commencing at Whitfords or Clarkson stations. Off peak and for weekends and public holidays, trains are every fifteen minutes. At night, trains are half-hourly or hourly. The journey to Perth Underground station takes three minutes.

Two regular bus routes serve Leederville station. Route 96, which goes to the University of Western Australia via Queen Elizabeth II Medical Centre and Thomas Street, and the Green CAT, which goes to Elizabeth Quay bus station via City West station. Rail replacement bus services operate as route 904.

Leederville station received 937,581 passengers in the 2013–14 financial year. In March 2018, Leederville station had approximately 2,700 boardings on an average weekday, making it the fourth least used station on the Yanchep line at the time. Before the construction of the bus interchange, access to the station was primarily by walking. The station is primarily used as a destination station rather than an origin station, with far more alightings than boardings in the morning and vice versa for the afternoon.
