= Yanchep line =

Suburban rail line in Perth, Western Australia

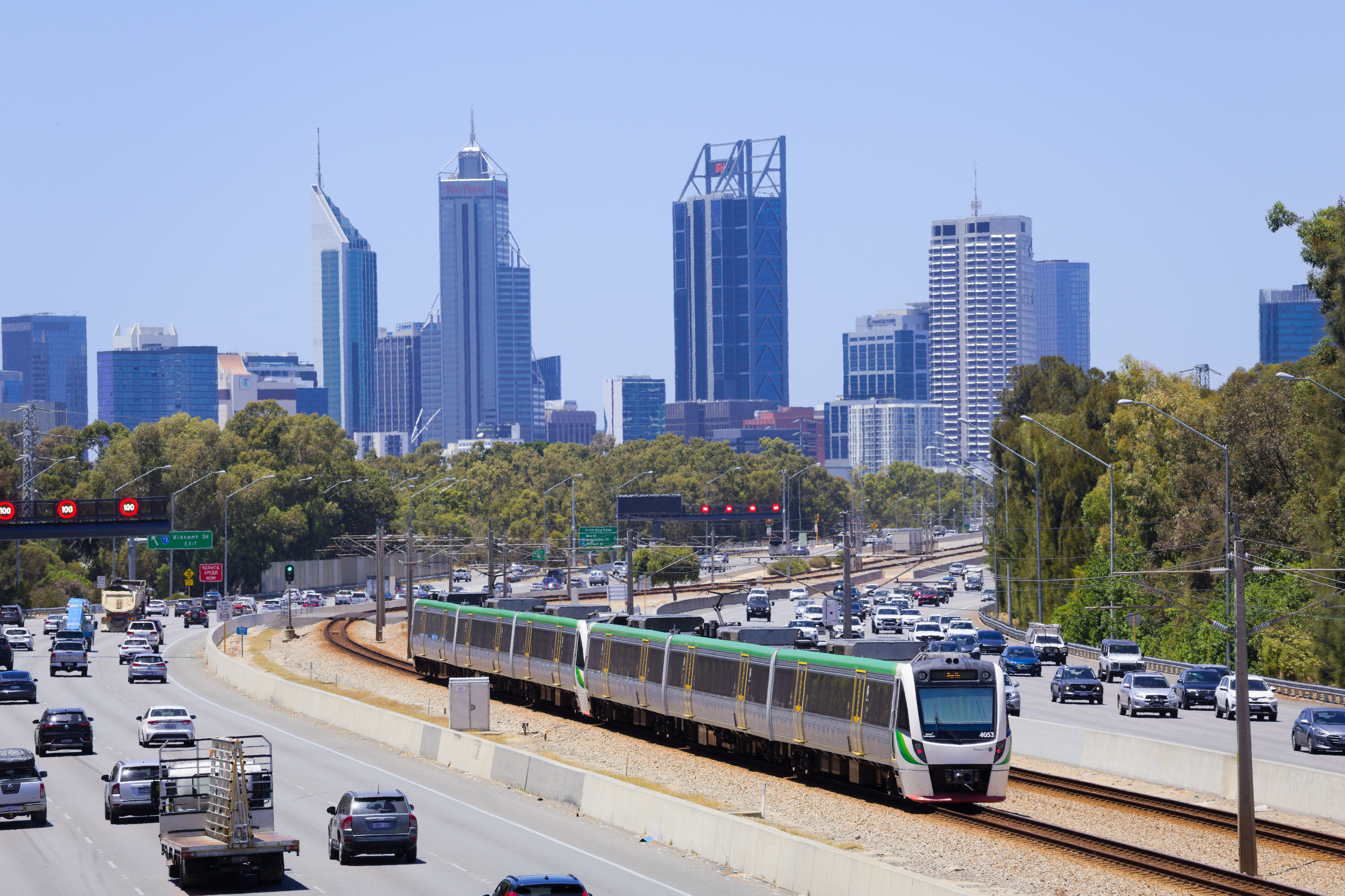
- A B-series train in the median strip of the Mitchell Freeway in Leederville

Overview
- Other names: Northern Suburbs Railway; Joondalup line (former name)
- Owner: Public Transport Authority (2003–present)
- Locale: Perth, Western Australia
- Termini: Yanchep (north); Elizabeth Quay (south)
- Continues as: Mandurah line
- Stations: 16

Service
- Type: Suburban rail
- System: Transperth
- Operators: Public Transport Authority (2003–present); Westrail / WAGR (1992–2003)
- Depot: Nowergup
- Rolling stock: Transperth B-series trains; Transperth C-series trains
- Ridership: 17,237,539 (year to June 2026)

History
- Work began: November 1989
- Opened: 20 December 1992 (partial); 21 March 1993 (full opening)
- Last extension: 14 July 2024

Technical
- Line length: 54.5 km (33.9 mi)
- Num of tracks: 2
- Character: At-grade and underground
- Track gauge: 1,067 mm (3 ft 6 in) narrow gauge
- Electrification: 25 kV 50 Hz AC from overhead catenary
- Operating speed: 130 km/h (81 mph)
- Signalling: Fixed block signalling
- Train protection system: Automatic train protection

The Yanchep line, formerly the Joondalup line, is a suburban railway line in Perth, Western Australia, linking the city's central business district (CBD) with its northern suburbs. Operated by the Public Transport Authority as part of the Transperth system, the Yanchep line is 54.5 kilometres (33.9 mi) long and has sixteen stations. It commences in a tunnel under the Perth CBD as a through service with the Mandurah line. North of there, the line enters the median strip of the Mitchell Freeway, where nine of the line's stations are. The Yanchep line diverges from the freeway to serve Joondalup and leaves the freeway at Butler for the northernmost four stations to Yanchep.

Planning began in 1987; after several transport modes were considered, including bus rapid transit, an electric railway was chosen. Known during construction as the Northern Suburbs Railway, the project was approved by the state cabinet in 1989 and construction began in November 1989. The line was built under multiple contracts totalling A$277 million. It used widely spaced stations with bus interchanges and large park-and-rides, distinguishing the line from Perth's three existing rail lines. The Joondalup line opened on 20 December 1992 to limited service and with three new stations: Leederville, Edgewater and Joondalup. Four more stations opened in February 1993, and on 21 March 1993, peak service and feeder bus routes commenced. The final station, Currambine, opened in August 1993.

An extension north to Clarkson station and rebuild of Currambine station opened in October 2004, and in January 2005, Greenwood opened as an infill station. The Joondalup line originally through-ran with the Armadale line via Perth station, but in August 2005, the line was terminated at Perth station, and in October 2007 the line was rerouted through a new tunnel under the CBD, with two new stations: Perth Underground and Elizabeth Quay. The Mandurah line opened in December 2007 to connect with the southern end of that tunnel. An extension north to Butler station opened in September 2014 and a three-station extension north to Yanchep station opened in July 2024, upon which the line became the Yanchep line.

B-series and C-series trains are the main rolling stock used on the Yanchep line. Trains run at a fifteen-minute headway during most times, reducing to as short as five-minutes in peak periods, when some services terminate at Whitfords or Clarkson stations. The travel time from Yanchep to Perth Underground is 49 minutes. The Yanchep line received 17,237,539 boardings in the year to June 2026, making it the second busiest line in the Transperth system, after the Mandurah line.

== History ==
=== Planning ===
The 1955 Plan for the Metropolitan Region, Perth and Fremantle, also known as the Stephenson–Hepburn Report, proposed a 12-mile (19 km) railway line branching off the Eastern Railway (Fremantle line) at Daglish, then heading west to Reabold Hill and then north to Whitfords Beach via City Beach, Scarborough, and North Beach. The branch was planned to have about eight or nine stations and projected to have about 20,000 daily passenger journeys. The report also proposed a highway to Yanchep, now known as the Mitchell Freeway. When the Metropolitan Region Scheme was adopted in 1963, the land for the proposed highway was reserved but the not the land for the proposed railway.

In 1979, the Fremantle line was closed due to declining patronage, a lack of growth potential, and to save capital and operational costs. A group named the Friends of the Railways was formed to advocate against the closure. Among the group's other proposals was for the electrification of all three lines and the construction of a line to Joondalup. The state government's Transport 2000: A Perth Study report, which was released in 1982, said that the electrification was not economically viable and that buses were sufficient to provide public transport in the northern suburbs. Following a Labor Party victory in the 1983 state election, the Fremantle line was reopened and planning for the electrification of the suburban rail system commenced.

Following the approval of electrification in 1985, attention turned to public transport in the northern suburbs. The Northern Suburbs Rapid Transit Study was commissioned in 1987 by Transperth and the Department of Transport at the request of the Government of Western Australia. The study, released in September 1988, considered possible modes of transport and the route to take. Routes considered were along West Coast Highway, Marmion Avenue, the western side of the Mitchell Freeway, the median strip of the Mitchell Freeway, the eastern side of the Mitchell Freeway, Wanneroo Road, and Alexander Drive. The route via the Mitchell Freeway's median strip was determined to have the lowest cost and least environmental impact. Transport modes considered were buses on a separate roadway, buses on a guided busway (like the O-Bahn Busway in Adelaide), light rail, heavy rail, automated rubber-tyred trains, high-capacity monorail, and an automated people mover system. A monorail or automated people mover was ruled out due to the cost and unproven nature of those technologies. Light rail was also ruled out due to having a lower operating speed than other modes and the desire to not introduce another mode to Perth's transport system. A bus expressway, guided busway and electric railway along the Mitchell Freeway were considered in further detail.

Public consultation found that the electric railway was the most popular option, but that a majority supported the two bus options combined. The two bus options were projected to increase northern suburbs public transport patronage by fourteen percent and the rail option was projected to increase patronage by nine to twelve percent, less than the bus options due to the time taken to transfer from bus to train. The net cost of the railway was estimated to be A$145 million, (Note: All currency totals are unadjusted for inflation.) compared to $87 million for the guided busway and $79 million for the bus expressway. The study concluded that either of the bus options were preferred over the electrified railway, and that further investigation should determine whether to build a bus expressway or a guided busway.

A majority of Labor members of Parliament and supporters were in support of the railway option despite the conclusions of the Northern Suburbs Rapid Transit Study. In response to the study, the state's minister for transport, Bob Pearce, set up an expert panel consisting of Murdoch University Associate Professor Peter Newman, Tyne and Wear Transport Director General David F. Howard, and University of Pennsylvania Professor Vukan Vuchic. The panel concluded that an electrified railway would be the best option, estimating that an electric railway would have a capital cost of $124 million and have a lower operating cost compared to the bus options, making up the difference in net cost within 12 to 15 years. The panel criticised the Northern Suburbs Rapid Transit Study for concentrating on commuters travelling to the CBD and said that the bus system the study recommended would not serve people doing short or local trips well. The panel said that other cities show that a rail trunk line with feeder buses would attract more passengers. The state cabinet officially chose the railway option in December 1988.

The state cabinet approved the Northern Suburbs Transit System Master Plan in the second half of 1989. The planned opening dates were the end of 1992 for Perth to Joondalup and the end of 1993 for Joondalup to Currambine. The master plan was released in November 1989. It laid out the route of the Northern Suburbs Railway and works proposed to occur. The railway was to be 29 kilometres (18 mi) long and have seven new stations: Glendalough, Stirling, Warwick, Whitfords, Edgewater, Joondalup, and Burns (later renamed Currambine). This made for an average station spacing of 4 kilometres (2 mi), above the 1.25-kilometre (0.8 mi) spacing on the other lines, allowing for a higher average speed. The master plan also gave the option of building stations at Oxford Street in Leederville, Wishart Street between Stirling and Warwick, and Hepburn Avenue between Warwick and Whitfords. Perth station, the centre of the rail network and southern terminus of the Northern Suburbs Railway, was planned to be expanded. The railway's planned route was mostly along the median strip of the Mitchell Freeway, deviating in the Perth CBD to reach Perth station and in Joondalup to serve the future city centre of Joondalup. A section between Joondalup and Burns was to be west of the future freeway, which at the time only reached as far north as Ocean Reef Road. The section through Joondalup was to be in a trench below surface level to allow for roads to bridge across. The railway was to be fully grade separated with no level crossings, unlike Perth's existing rail network.

The Northern Suburbs Railway's route was placed in the Mitchell Freeway's median strip to reduce costs as the freeway was already grade separated from other roads and had its own right of way. The disadvantage of freeway-running railways is that access to the stations is more difficult, with the walking distance in earlier plans from a bus interchange to the platform being between 70 metres (230 ft) and 180 metres (590 ft), and even longer for park and ride passengers. Earlier plans also had limited shelter and facilities at each station. This was deemed bad for patronage, so the master plan instead located bus interchanges closer to the station platform. In the cases of Stirling, Warwick and Whitfords stations, the bus interchanges are on a bridge directly above the train platforms. The feeder buses were planned to run between pairs of adjoining stations at a 10 to 15 minute headway in peak, covering the area between Wanneroo Road and the coastline. According to forecasts, two-thirds of Northern Suburbs Railway passengers would use the feeder buses and 120 buses would be required. The opening of the railway would allow for express buses along the Mitchell Freeway to be phased out.

Much of the Mitchell Freeway was designed with provisions for a public transport corridor in its median strip. However, a 5-kilometre (3 mi) section between Loftus Street in Leederville and Hutton Street in Osborne Park was not. This section was built as a single carriageway with a dividing barrier. On that section, a second carriageway, which now carries the freeway's northbound lanes, was planned to be constructed. Additional bridges would be built across Vincent Street, Powis Street, and Scarborough Beach Road for the new carriageway and the railway. Twelve other road bridges and nine pedestrian bridges needed minor modifications to ensure sufficient clearance for the overhead wires, and four bridges over the railway in Joondalup needed to be constructed. New stowage tracks at Claisebrook depot would be required, and trains would also be stored at Whitfords station temporarily and at Currambine station.

The total cost of the Northern Suburbs Railway was estimated to be $222.8 million (equivalent to $530 million in 2022), of which $133.17 million was for the railway's construction and $89.63 million was for the acquisition of 22 two-car electric multiple unit trains. An additional $27 million for the works to widen the Mitchell Freeway between Leederville and Osborne Park was funded separately and managed by the Main Roads Department. The rest of the construction works were managed by Westrail. The total cost was higher than the $145 million estimated in 1988 due to an underestimation in the cost of some parts of the project, an increase in facilities at stations, more bridges, the extension to Currambine which was not accounted for, additional railcars due to higher forecast demand, and inflation. The railway was planned to open between Perth and Joondalup by the end of 1992 and from Joondalup to Currambine by the end of 1993, although meeting the 1992 deadline was regarded as unrealistic as it meant that detailed design and construction had to occur in three years.

=== Construction ===
In November 1989, the Fremantle line was realigned north between Perth station and the Mitchell Freeway to make way for the Roe Street tunnel. The premier of Western Australia, Peter Dowding, hammered in the first spike on 14 November 1989, marking the start of construction. That year, the Parliament of Western Australia passed the Perth–Joondalup Railway Act 1989, authorising the railway's construction; the legislation received royal assent on 15 January 1990.

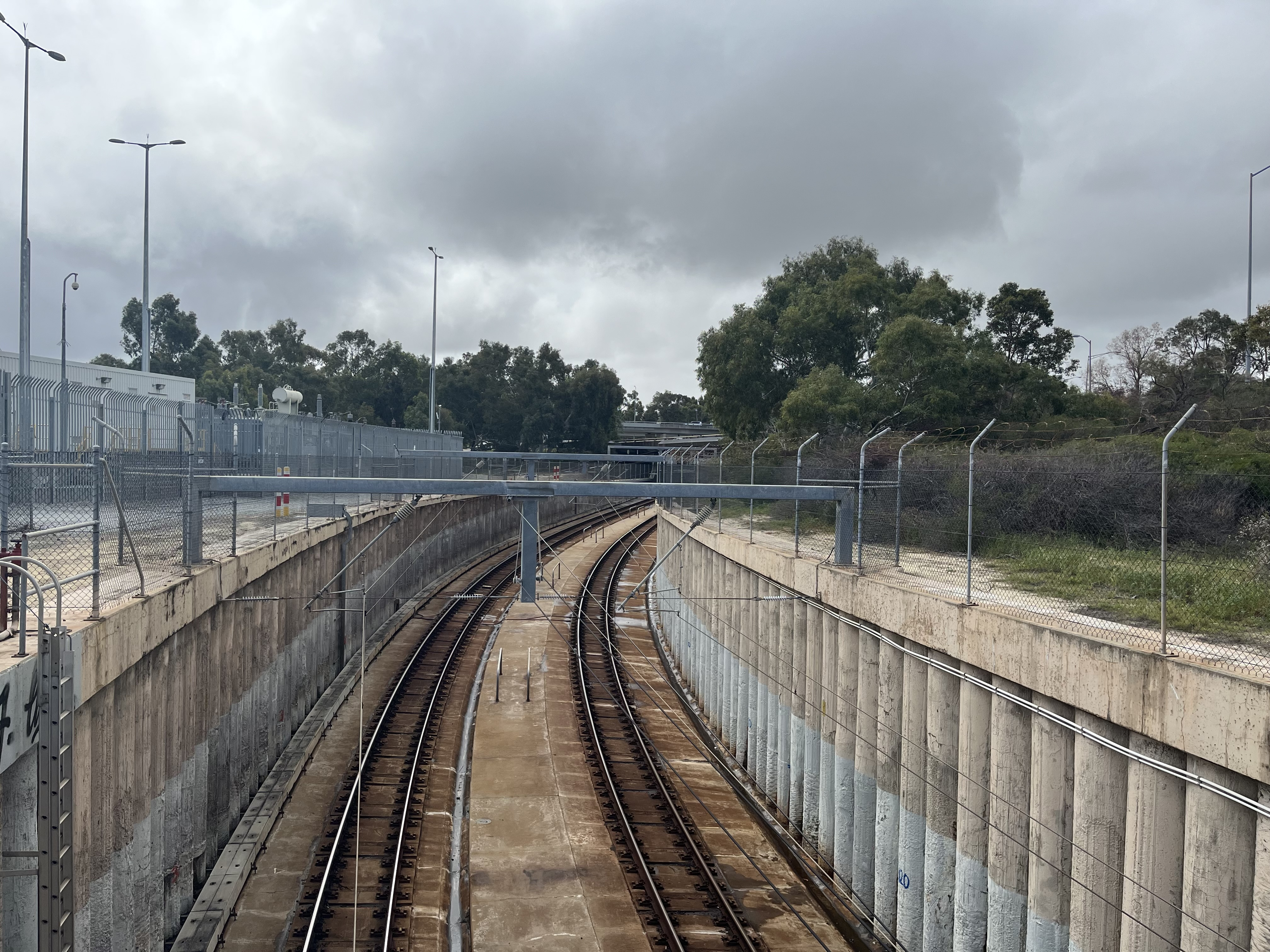
The Roe Street tunnel northern ramp, October 2024

By the end of 1990, earthworks at Joondalup and the Mitchell Freeway roadworks between Loftus Street and Hutton Street were underway. The project's first contract was awarded in December 1990 to Remm Constructions. It was a $4.3 million contract for the construction of the walls of the tunnel under Roe Street. The tunnel is 130 metres (430 ft) long, with 250-metre-long (820 ft) ramps at each end. The tunnel and ramp's route partially followed a bus on-ramp from Roe Street to the freeway, allowing the reuse of a bridge carrying the Mitchell Freeway's westbound carriageway above the bus lane. A temporary bus on-ramp replaced it until the railway was opened. The tunnel walls were constructed using secant piles. The close proximity of the tunnel to the Mitchell Freeway's bridge footings complicated the construction process and necessitated preventing any ground movement. The tunnel's second contract, for the excavation and construction of the floor and roof, was awarded to Leighton Contractors. Construction on that phase was planned to take place in the second half of 1991. The tunnel's total cost was about $8–9 million.

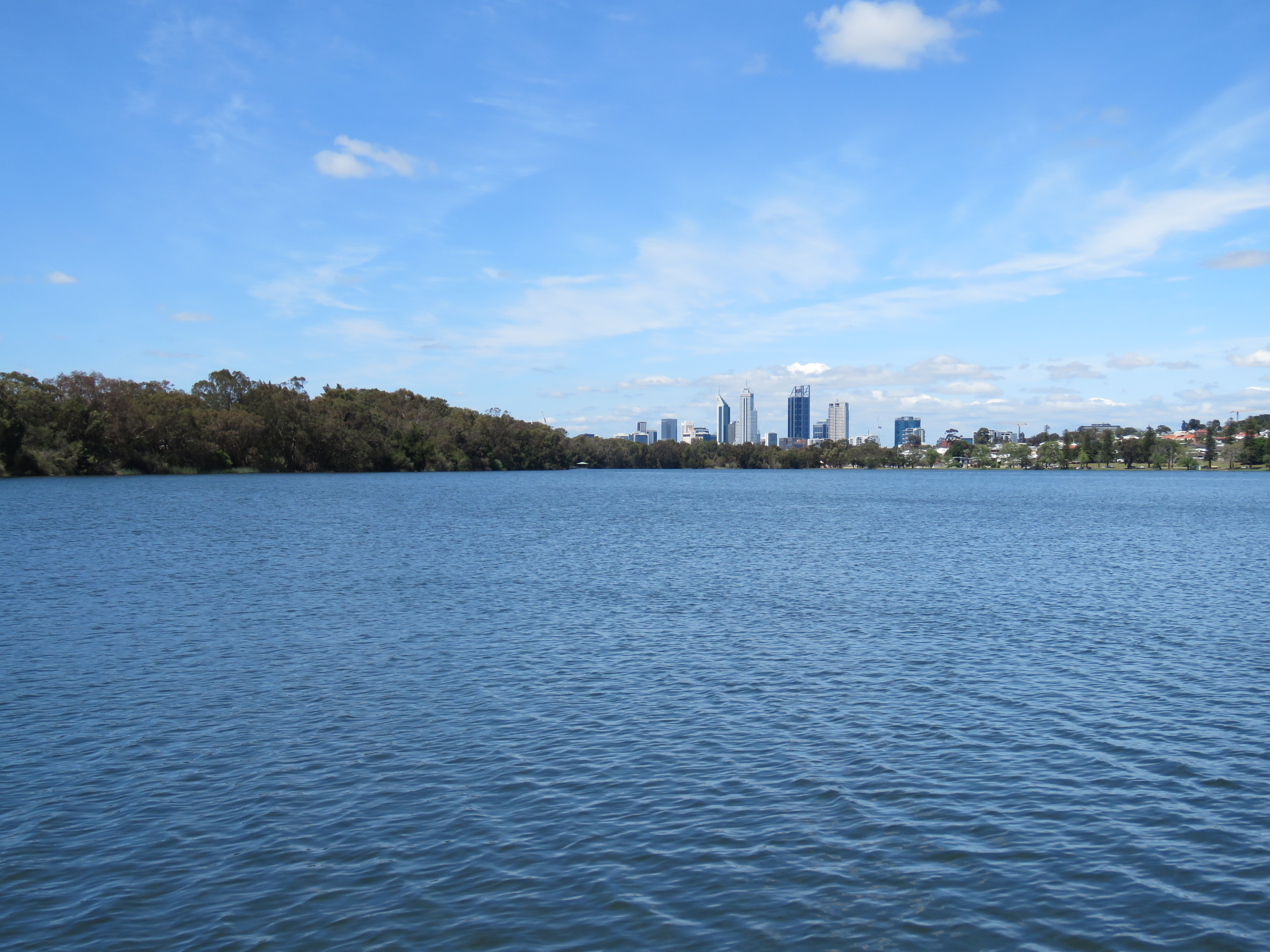
Galup (Lake Monger) in October 2021

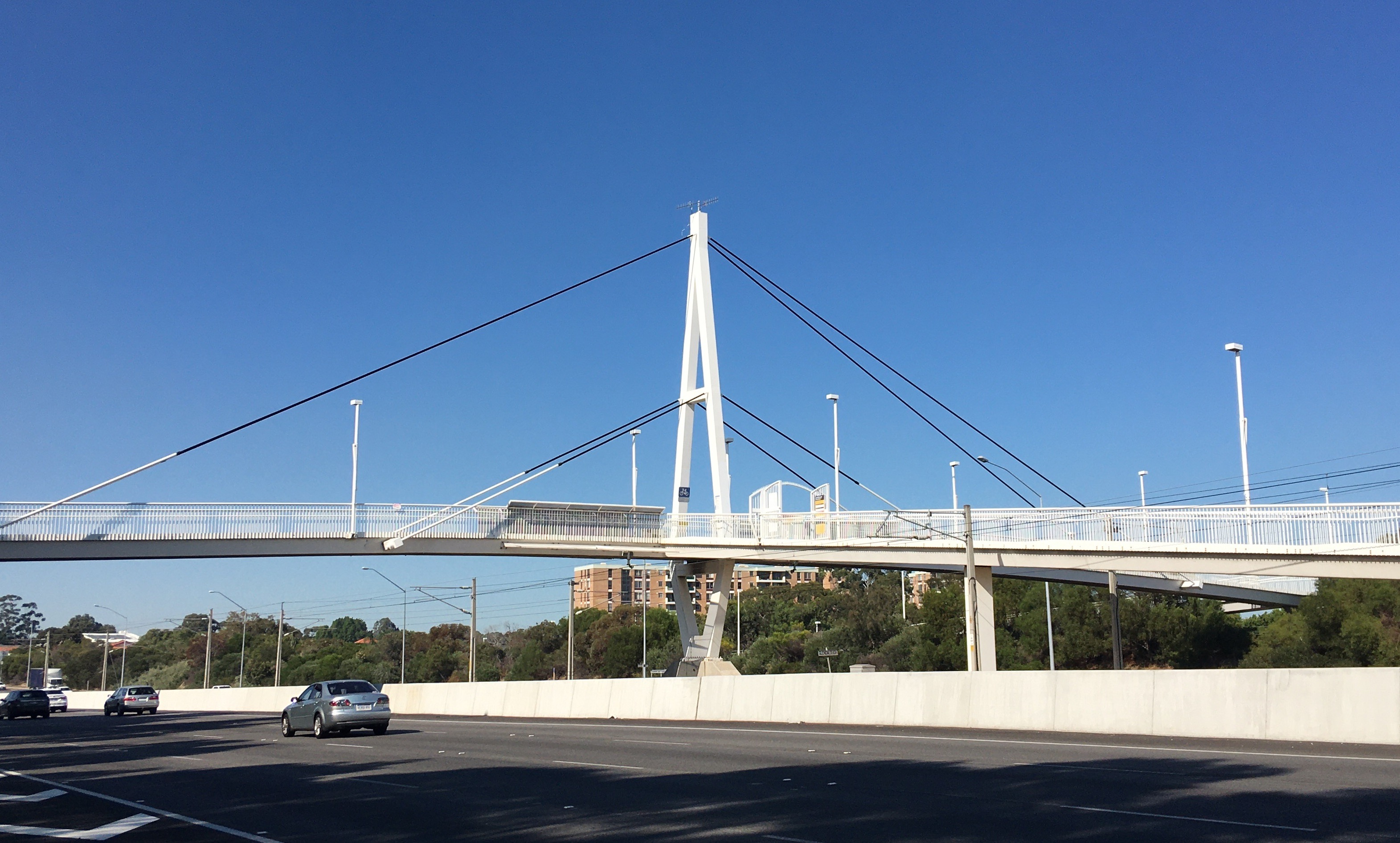
Leeder Street footbridge, which connects to Glendalough station

The second Mitchell Freeway carriageway between Loftus Street and Hutton Street passed in close proximity to the environmentally sensitive lake Galup, known at the time as Lake Monger. (Note: Lake Monger was renamed Galup in June 2025.) After criticism over the encroachment on the lake, Premier Carmen Lawrence announced in July 1990 that a review of the plans would be undertaken by Peter Newman in cooperation with Main Roads engineers. In response to Newman's report, the new carriageway was scaled back from five lanes to four. About 650,000 tonnes (640,000 long tons; 720,000 short tons) of sand from the Joondalup area was used to compact the marshy soil next to the lake. Most of the Mitchell Freeway roadworks were done in-house by Main Roads Department day labourers, but the freeway and rail bridges across Vincent Street, Powis Street, and Scarborough Beach Road were built by Leighton for $8.8 million. Work started on those bridges in April 1991. The bridges were incrementally launched to avoid disruption to road traffic. Completion of the freeway bridge across Vincent Street was delayed by three months due to a technical problem, resulting in the completion of the freeway project being delayed. Three cable-stayed footbridges across the freeway were also constructed by Leighton under a separate $5.3 million contract. The Britannia Road footbridge was new, while the Oxford Street and Leeder Street bridges were replacing old footbridges that were not long enough for the widened freeway. The latter two footbridges provide access to Leederville and Glendalough stations, respectively. The new northbound Mitchell Freeway carriageway opened on 21 June 1992, after eighteen months of construction, allowing railway work along that section to begin.

The Fitzgerald Street level crossing, used exclusively by buses to access Wellington Street bus station, was relocated 250 metres (820 ft) west to avoid intersecting with the Northern Suburbs Railway. The master plan said the level crossing should be replaced by a bridge, but Parliament passed the Fitzgerald Street Bus Bridge Act 1991 in November 1991 to prevent the bridge from being built without the government consulting the Perth City Council, residents and businesses. The legislation was introduced to Parliament by the independent member for Perth, Ian Alexander, who wanted the railway tunnelled and a ground-level bus road built instead, calling the bridge a "cheap and nasty solution". Transport Minister Pam Beggs said that tunnelling the railway would cost an additional $11 million and that she would rather spend money on the outer suburbs. Beggs submitted a report to the Legislative Assembly detailing consultation with the stakeholders, but a resolution to build the bridge failed to pass, leading to the bridge's cancellation. The new level crossing opened in March 1993. A nearby bus bridge next to the Mitchell Freeway opened in 2010 as part of the construction of Perth Arena.

Perth station underwent an upgrade and expansion. A new track and platform were constructed at the northern side of the station, providing for a total of four through tracks. To accommodate the extra track, the Barrack Street Bridge had an additional span added to its northern end, which was done in conjunction with a refurbishment of the bridge to improve its structural integrity. A new overpass was constructed at the station's western end as well. Stirling, Warwick, and Whitfords stations were built by Leighton; Glendalough, Edgewater, and Joondalup stations were built by Sabemo, a division of Transfield; and Leederville station was built by John Holland. Due to construction delays, Glendalough, Stirling, Warwick, and Whitfords stations were not finished by the end of 1992. In total, the value of the station construction contracts, excluding Currambine, was $40 million. Currambine station was built by Doubikin Constructions for $2.9 million.

External images
- A train carrying ballast via Rail Heritage WA
- A train carrying rails during tracklaying via Rail Heritage WA
- An ADK diesel multiple unit during testing via Rail Heritage WA

The overhead line equipment was built by Barclay Mowlem as an extension to their contract for the electrification of the existing rail network. Installation of the masts for the overhead line equipment was underway by April 1992. Unusually, the masts were installed before the tracks were laid, as track laying was delayed by the Mitchell Freeway works. Track laying by Westrail started in July 1992, starting at the southern end and heading north. This was delayed by three strikes: a quarry workers’ strike in August, a week-long track workers’ strike in September, and a 10-day strike by Westrail locomotive drivers in October and November, which prevented the delivery of rails and ballast. The Edgewater traction substation was turned on for the first time on 31 October, and the overhead line equipment was energised the following day, allowing the first electric multiple unit train to enter the line on 20 November. The completion of the signalling system was delayed by an electrical workers' strike; it was finished on 11 December and commissioned over the following two days, allowing driver training to commence on 14 December.

=== Opening ===
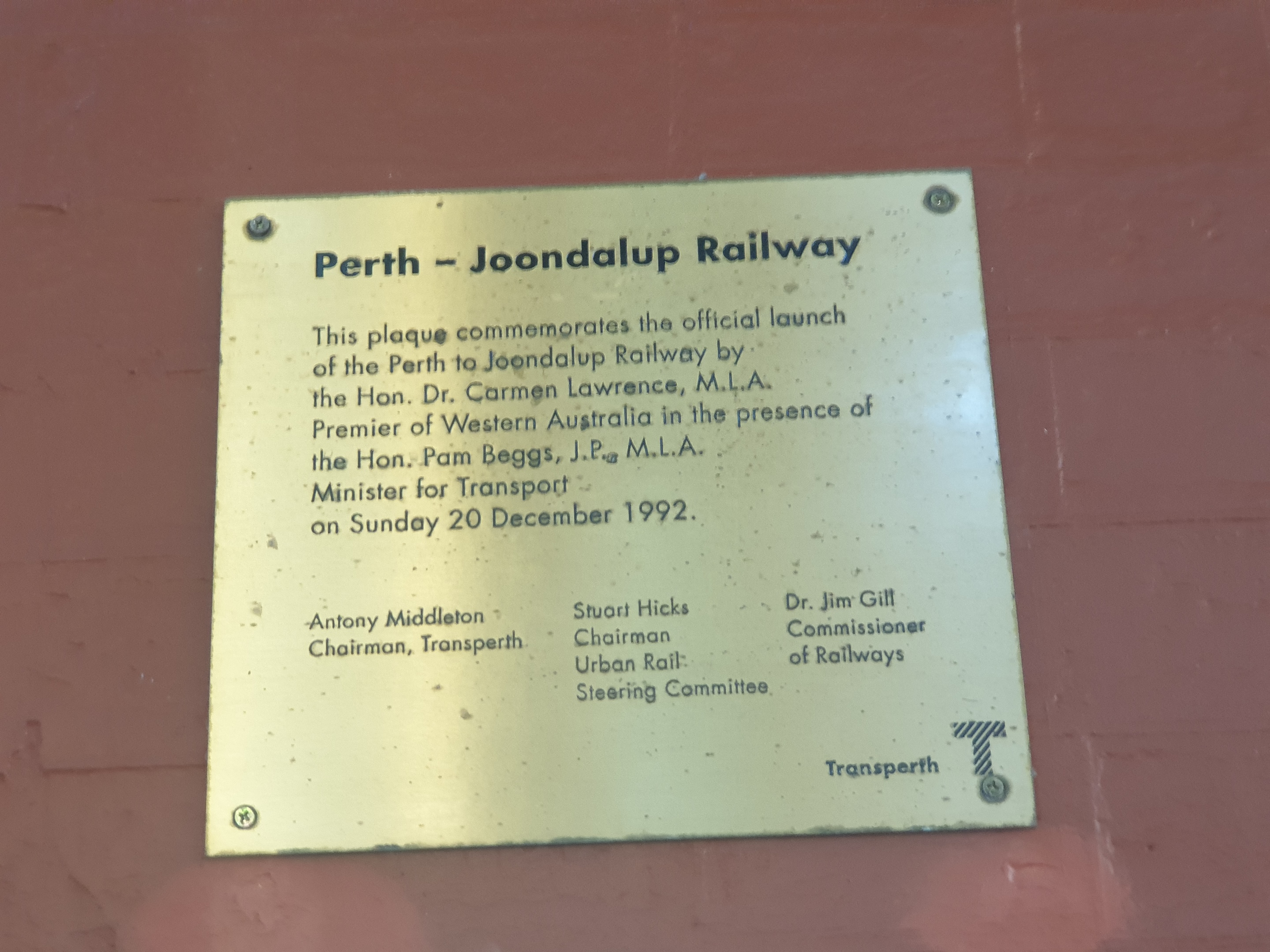
Plaque commemorating the opening of the Joondalup line on 20 December 1992 at Perth station

The first stage of the Joondalup line was officially opened on 20 December 1992 by Premier Carmen Lawrence and Transport Minister Pam Beggs. This involved the opening of Leederville, Edgewater and Joondalup stations. The West Australian newspaper reported that hundreds of people attended the opening of Leederville and Edgewater stations, and thousands of people attended the opening of Joondalup station, but that the state opposition criticised the opening ceremonies by saying that they were an "expensive political extravaganza". From 21 December, train services ran from Perth to the three new stations under a limited service "discoveride" brand, meaning that train services had a limited frequency of every half-an-hour and only operated between 9:30 am and 2:30 pm.

The remaining four stations opened throughout February 1993: Whitfords on 14 February, Glendalough and Stirling on 21 February, and Warwick on 28 February. Full service on the line between Perth and Joondalup was originally scheduled to start on 7 March 1993, but was delayed by two weeks as driver training took longer than expected. Full service commenced on 21 March 1993. This included trains in peak hour for the first time and feeder buses servicing the Joondalup line's bus interchanges. Bus routes along the Mitchell Freeway were withdrawn, including some of Perth's busiest bus routes, such as the 396 to Warwick. The bus changes encountered resistance, particularly for their impact on schoolchildren, which led to the retention of two of the school bus services that were planned to be cancelled. Services to and from Joondalup through ran with the Armadale line, while services to and from Whitfords terminated at Perth. Newly appointed Coalition transport minister Eric Charlton held a small opening ceremony at Joondalup station, in contrast to the large opening ceremony conducted by the Labor government in December 1992. The final part of the Northern Suburbs Railway, the 3 kilometres (2 mi) from Joondalup to Currambine station, opened on 8 August 1993. The final cost was $277 million.

=== Expansion under New MetroRail ===
During the 1996 state election campaign, Liberal Premier Richard Court committed to constructing an extension from Currambine to Clarkson by 2000 for $28 million, plus $12 million for additional rolling stock. In December 1997, the state government also committed to building Greenwood station at Hepburn Avenue, a site given for an optional station in the 1989 master plan. In November 1999, Parliament passed the Railway (Northern and Southern Urban Extensions) Act 1999 authorising the extension to Clarkson and the construction of the Mandurah line.

The Clarkson extension was delayed several times; in June 1999, it was delayed beyond 2001, and in June 2000, it was delayed until 2003. Later that month, the a master plan was released, detailing the plans for the extension to Clarkson, the construction of Greenwood station, and a later extension to Butler. As the extension to Clarkson was to run within the median strip of the future Mitchell Freeway extension, Currambine station had to be rebuilt because the original station was located on the western side of the freeway reserve. (Note: The railway line south of Currambine station was largely left as is, and was not relocated until the Mitchell Freeway was extended to Burns Beach Road in 2007 and 2008 by Macmahon Contractors. This extension also involved constructing a tunnel to route the railway line beneath the freeway.) Other works proposed in the master plan were for the construction of a railcar depot in Nowergup north of Clarkson station to allow for more trains and replace the stowage facility at Currambine, and extensions to all the platforms along the line to allow for six-car trains. The estimated cost of the whole project was $58 million for the infrastructure, and $23 million for the additional rolling stock, for a total of $81 million. By October, the projected cost had risen to $99 million.

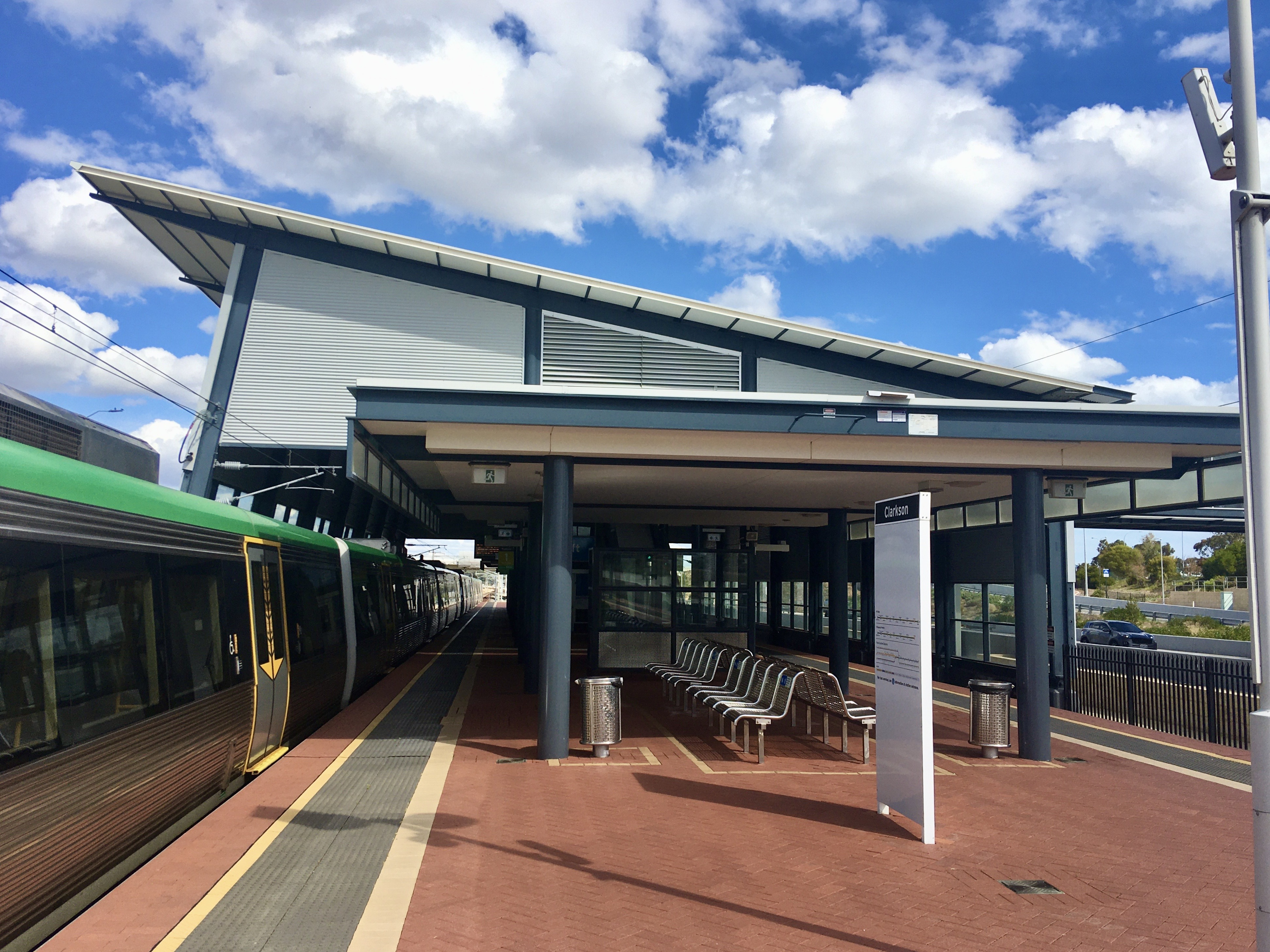
Clarkson station, which opened on 4 October 2004

The Clarkson extension was built under several different contracts, covering earthworks, the bridge over Burns Beach Road, rail infrastructure, Currambine station, Clarkson station, Greenwood station, and the platform extensions. Construction on the extension began in May 2001, starting with earthworks, and the construction of Greenwood station began in March 2004. Nowergup depot was opened in June 2004, ahead of the extension to Clarkson and the new Currambine station opening on 4 October 2004, the same day on which the first five B-series trains entered service on the Joondalup line. Greenwood station opened on 29 January 2005.

=== Mandurah line ===
In March 1999, the South West Metropolitan Railway Master Plan for the construction of the Mandurah line was approved by the state government. It was to branch off the Armadale line at Kenwick to head to Mandurah, south of Perth. Running the Mandurah line via the Kwinana Freeway was not considered viable due to its narrower median strip compared to the Mitchell Freeway's. The Joondalup line would through-run with the Mandurah line upon its opening, as they were forecast to be the busiest lines, with six-car trains required to meet demand on both lines. Following the election of a Labor government, in July 2001, it was announced that the Mandurah line would be rerouted via the Kwinana Freeway, with a tunnel under the Perth CBD to connect to the Joondalup line. A new master plan was released in August 2002, which divided the Mandurah line's construction into several packages, Package F being the City Project: the construction of the tunnel under the Perth CBD. The project included the construction of 690 metres (2,260 ft) of twin bored tunnels under the Perth CBD, a tunnel portal west of Perth station, and two underground stations: William Street (now known as Perth Underground), which connects to the original Perth station, and Esplanade (now known as Elizabeth Quay).

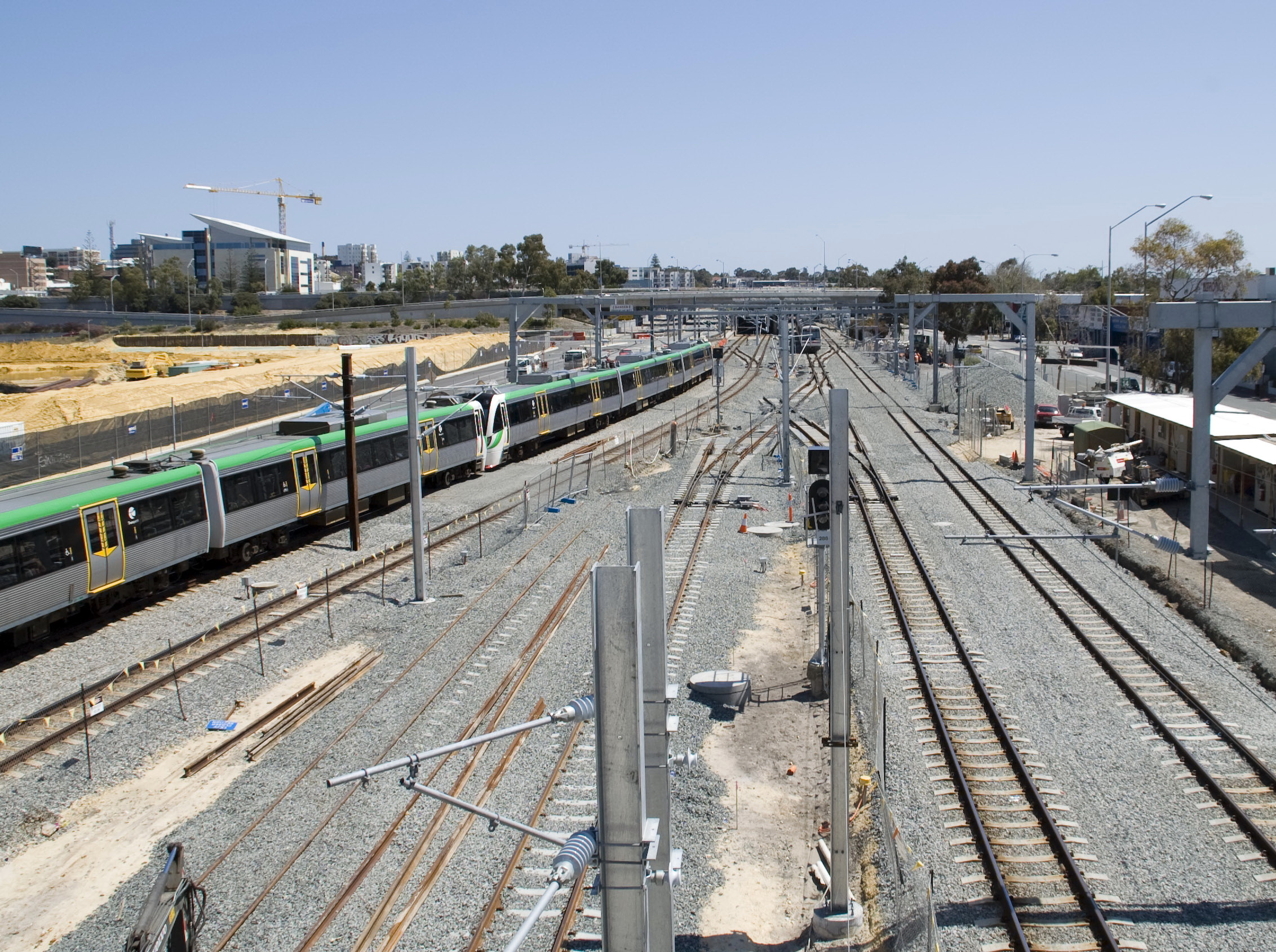
The Joondalup line (left) on 6 October 2007, one day before the line was shut down to connect to the William Street tunnel tracks (middle). The Fremantle line is on the right.

The contract for the City Project was awarded to Leighton–Kumagai Gumi in February 2004 for $324.5 million. Construction began later that month. With the opening of the Thornlie line as a branch of the Armadale line, through services to the Armadale line ceased on 8 August 2005 and Joondalup line trains began terminating at Perth station, in preparation for through running with the Mandurah line. By October 2005, the Joondalup line tracks west of Perth station had been slewed 6 metres (20 ft) to the south to make way for the construction of the tunnel portal. The City Project reached practical completion in September 2007. From 7 October to 14 October 2007, the Joondalup line was shut down between Leederville and Perth stations to connect the tunnel tracks to the Joondalup line. The Joondalup line reopened on 15 October 2007 with its new southern terminus at Esplanade station, (Note: Esplanade station was renamed Elizabeth Quay station on 31 January 2016.) and the Mandurah line opened on 23 December 2007.

=== Extension to Butler ===
In August 2008, Labor Premier Alan Carpenter committed to extending the Joondalup line from Clarkson to Butler by 2012. Following the September 2008 state election, the incoming Liberal government deferred the extension. In February 2009, however, the government committed to proceeding with the extension at a cost of $160 million. Legislation authorising the Butler extension was passed as the Railway (Butler to Brighton) Act 2010 in July 2010, the extension by this point budgeted at $240.7 million. Only one station was to be built as part of the extension instead of two as was proposed in the 2000 extension master plan, meaning there would not be a separate station for park-and-ride outside the Butler town centre.

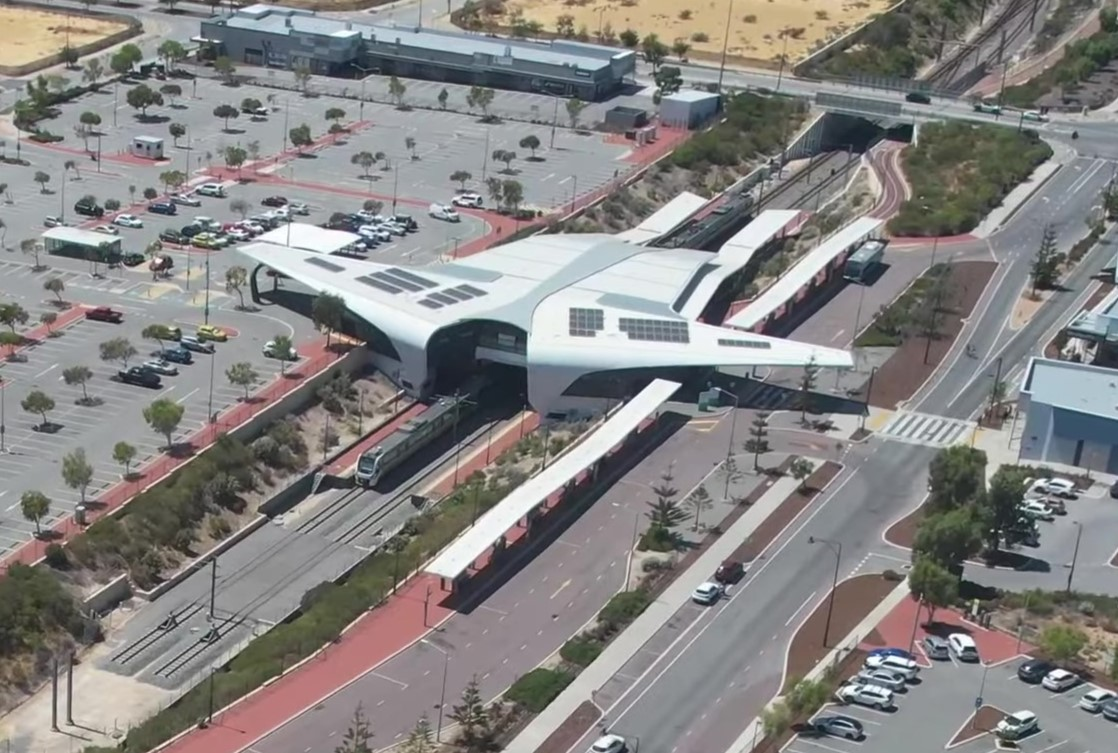
Butler station, which opened on 21 September 2014

The first contract for the Butler extension, for earthworks, was awarded in December 2010. Contracts for bridges, the station, tracklaying, and signalling were let in 2011 and 2012. Construction on the station began in July 2012. By October 2012, earthworks and bridge construction were complete, allowing track laying to commence. By April 2014, the station was complete. The first train ran on the Butler extension on 25 August 2014, with train driver familiarisation beginning thereafter. The extension was opened on 21 September 2014 by Premier Colin Barnett and Transport Minister Dean Nalder, three months early and $20 million under budget.

=== Extension to Yanchep ===
In July 2011, the government's Public Transport in Perth in 2031 plan was released, which planned for an extension to Yanchep to be constructed by 2020 as one of two key transformational projects, the other being light rail from the CBD to Mirrabooka. In 2014, the government said the Yanchep extension would not commence construction until the Forrestfield–Airport Link is completed, delaying the opening of the Yanchep extension until the mid-2020s. The Perth and Peel@3.5 million report, released in July 2016, said that the Yanchep extension would be built by the time Perth's population reaches 2.7 million. Meanwhile, the Yanchep extension was committed to by the Labor Party ahead of the 2013 state election as part of its Metronet project. The Labor Party lost, so ahead of the 2017 state election, the Labor Party again committed to opening the Yanchep extension by 2021 for $386 million. The 2017 election resulted in the election of a Labor government.

In May 2017, following negotiations between the federal and state governments, it was announced that federal funding for the cancelled Perth Freight Link would be used on the Yanchep Rail Extension, subject to assessment by Infrastructure Australia. The September 2017 state budget gave the Yanchep Rail Extension a cost of $520.2 million. The business case for the Yanchep Rail Extension was submitted to Infrastructure Australia in August 2017, which released its assessment of the project in November 2018, adding the project to the Infrastructure Priority List as a "High Priority Project" and giving it a projected economic benefit of $2.549 billion and a benefit–cost ratio of 2.6. Infrastructure Australia recommended that the contract for the Thornlie–Cockburn Link be combined with the contract for the Yanchep Rail Extension to save costs during procurement, although local contractors expressed concerns that the two projects had different requirements, were in different parts of Perth, and that combining the projects would price out smaller contractors. The Infrastructure Australia assessment allowed $700 million in federal funding to be spent on the two projects, of which $350 million was for the Yanchep Rail Extension.

Legislation was introduced to Parliament in May 2018 and passed as the Railway (METRONET) Act 2018 in November 2018. The project definition plan, detailing the scope of the Yanchep Rail Extension, was approved by the state cabinet in July 2018. A request for proposal was released in September 2018 for the design and construct contract for the Yanchep Rail Extension and the Thornlie–Cockburn Link. Two consortia were shortlisted in April 2019: METROconnex, a joint venture between Coleman Rail, Clough Group, and Georgiou Group; and NEWest Alliance, a joint venture between CPB Contractors and Downer. In November 2019, NEWest Alliance was announced as the preferred proponent, and the contract was awarded in the following month, the cost of the Yanchep Rail Extension rising to $531.7 million.

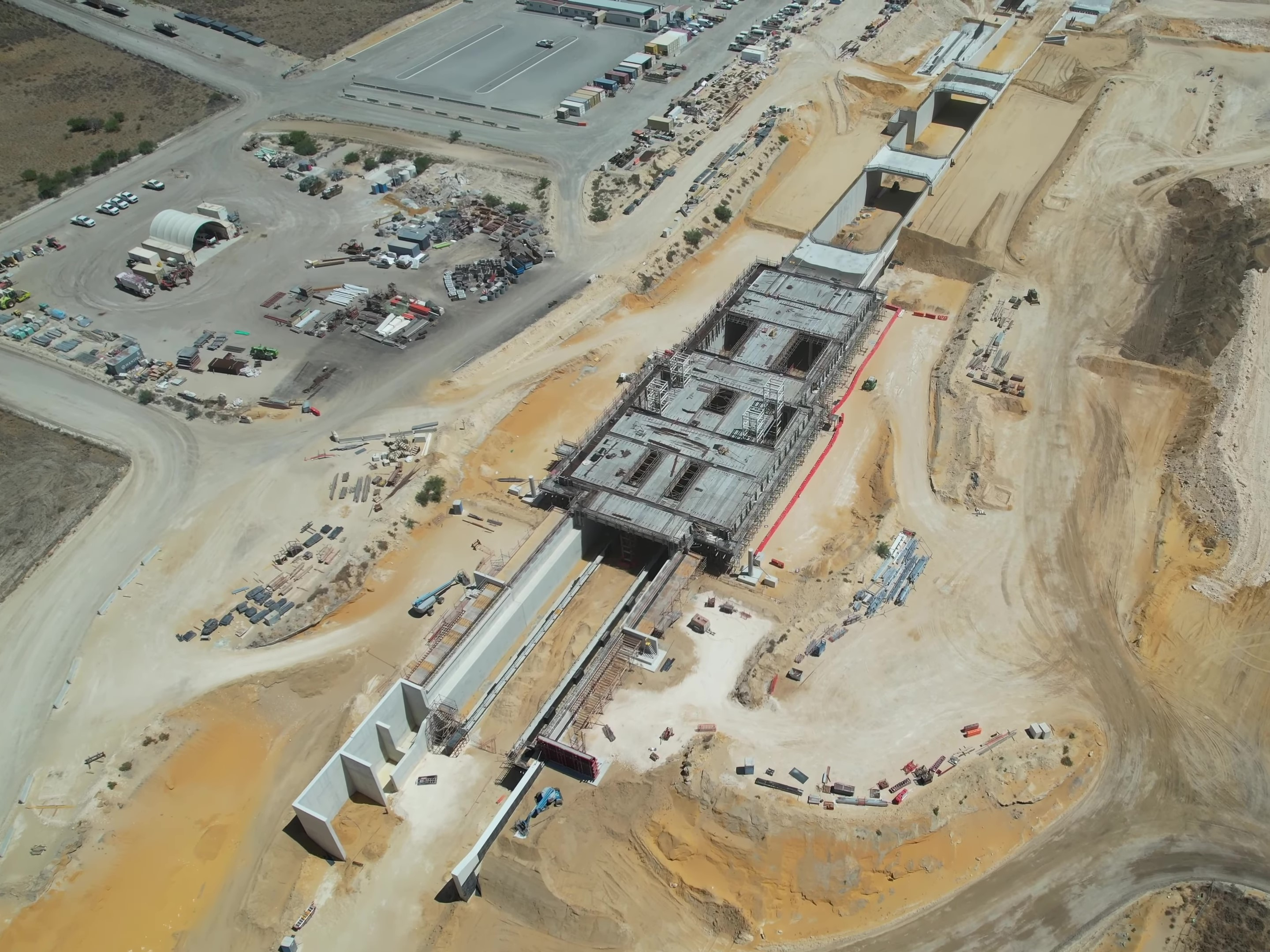
Alkimos station under construction in February 2023

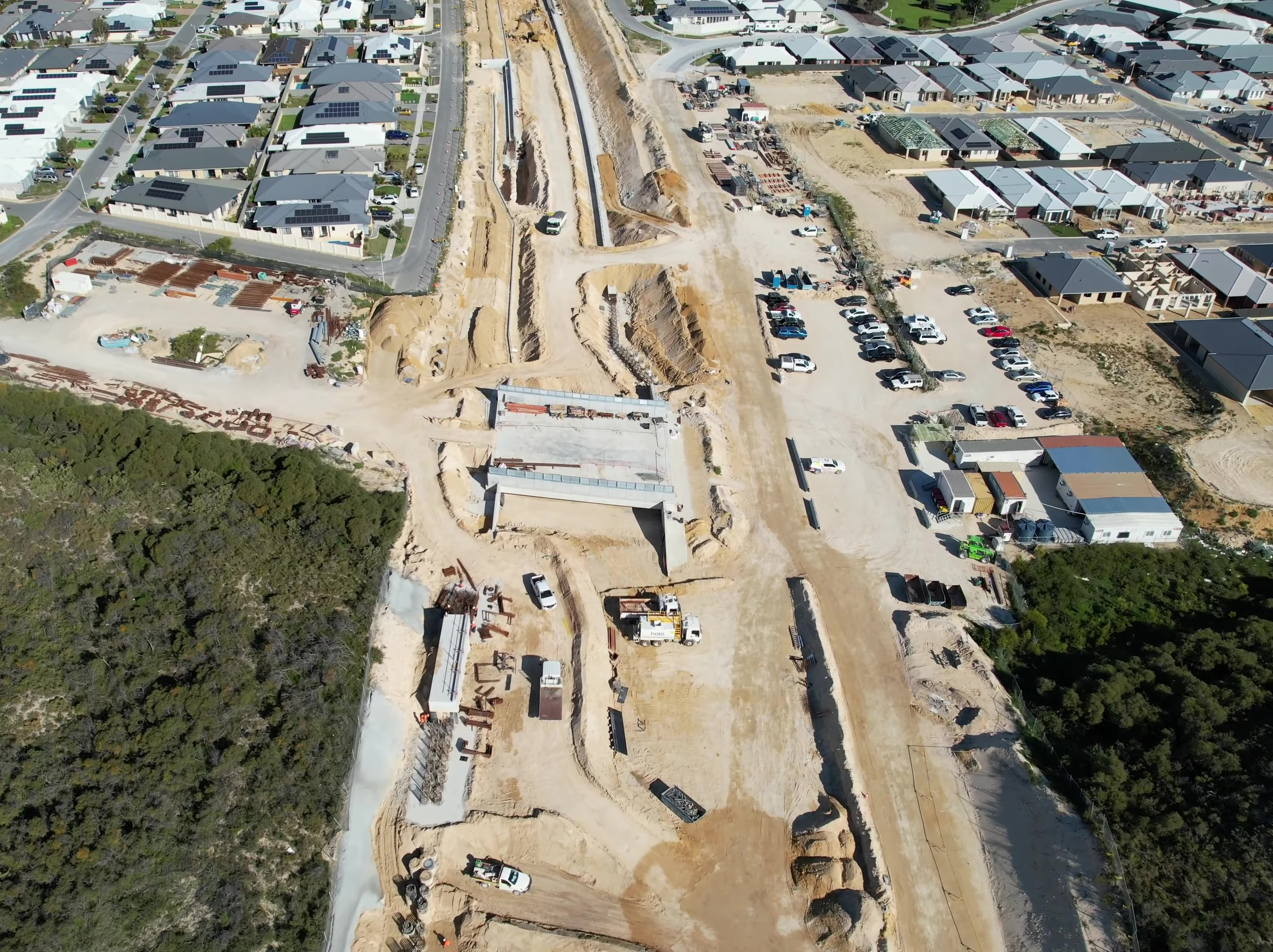
Howden Road bridge under construction in August 2023

Early works began in November 2019 and a sod turning ceremony took place on 24 November, making the Yanchep Rail Extension the second Metronet project to begin construction, after the Forrestfield–Airport Link. Major works on the Yanchep Rail Extension began in mid-2020. Construction at Alkimos station had begun by March 2021, with the first major concrete pour taking place that month. In June 2021, PerthNow reported that work on the Yanchep Rail Extension had stalled, but the Public Transport Authority was still saying the extension would open in late 2022. The government first raised the potential for a delay in July 2021, and after the September 2021 state budget, it was revealed that the Yanchep Rail Extension's opening date would be delayed by a year to late 2023 due to a skills shortage and to ease pressure on Western Australia's construction industry. To cut costs, the construction of a shared path along the extension was cancelled, with the decision being justified by there also being a shared path along Marmion Avenue and a proposed one to be constructed as part of the extension of the Mitchell Freeway. The decision to cancel the shared path was criticised by cycling groups and the City of Wanneroo. By the end of 2021, work on all three stations was underway. At Eglinton and Yanchep stations, the foundations were being poured, and at Alkimos station, retaining walls had been put up.

The March 2022 federal budget revealed the federal government would provide $90 million of additional funding for the project, bringing its share of the project to $440 million. The May 2022 state budget revealed a $175.3 million cost increase, the May 2023 state budget revealed a $375.3 million cost increase, and the May 2024 state budget revealed a $288 million cost increase, bringing the extension's total cost to $1.27 billion. The Liberal Party has readily criticised the cost increases, saying the money should instead be spent on healthcare among other things, but Transport Minister Rita Saffioti blamed the overruns on the cost of steel, diesel, and concrete, and the COVID-19 pandemic.

After the May 2023 state budget, the government said that the Yanchep extension "is due for completion at the end of 2023, with services commencing in the new year" That month, the first 2.7 kilometres (1.7 mi) of track had been laid. The first train ran on the Yanchep Rail Extension on 22 December 2023. The opening date was revealed in April 2024. The extension was officially opened by Premier Roger Cook and Transport Minister Saffioti on 14 July 2024, with celebrations occurring at Yanchep station. Regular train and bus services commenced the following day. Upon the extension's opening, the Joondalup line was renamed the Yanchep line.

== Description ==
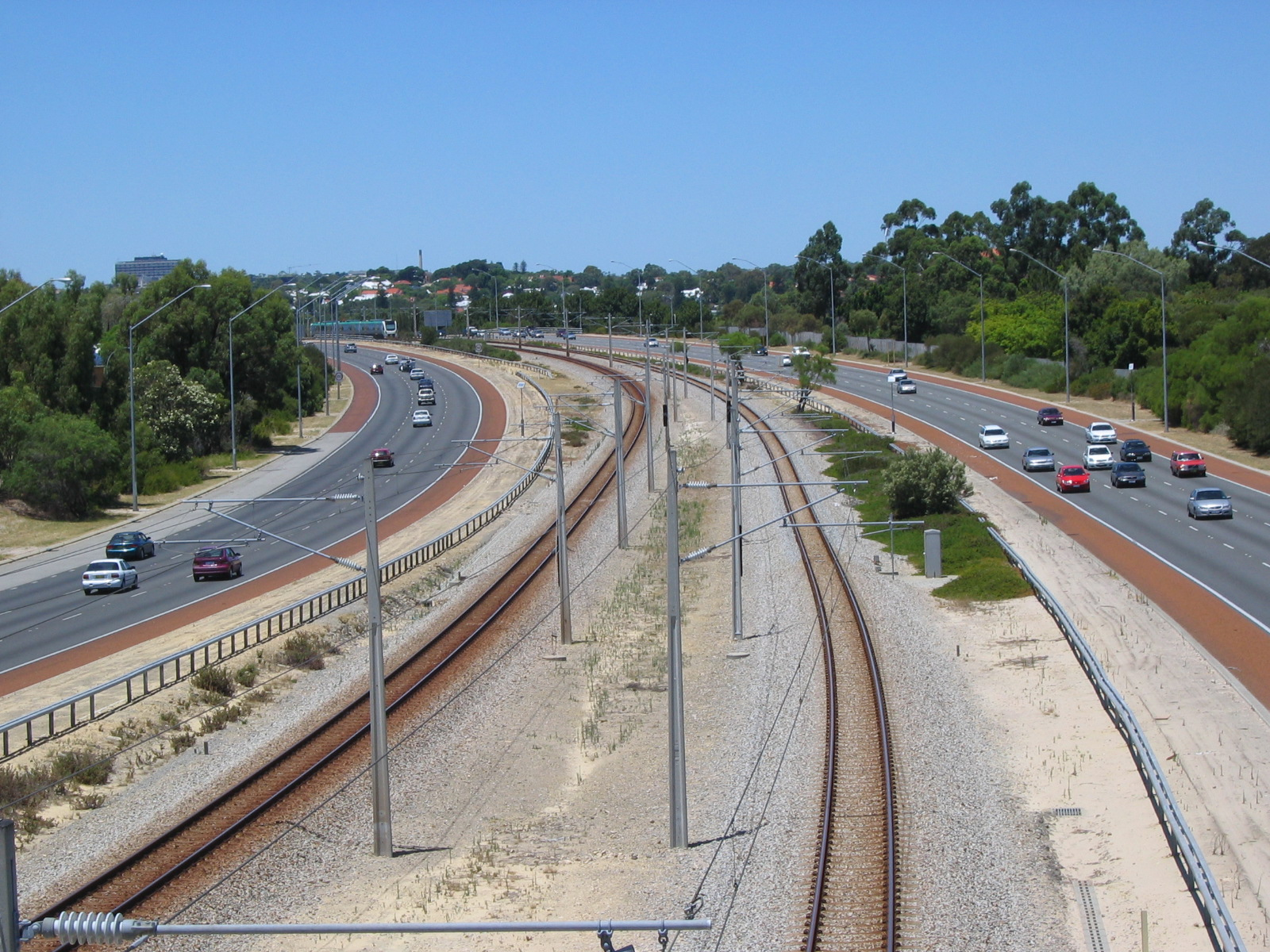
The Yanchep line viewed from the Glendalough station footbridge

The Yanchep line was built with 1,067 mm (3 ft 6 in) narrow gauge track. Trains are powered by 25 kV 50 Hz AC overhead line equipment that is powered by three substations at Sutherland Street in West Perth, Edgewater, and Nowergup. The maximum speed is 110 kilometres per hour (68 mph) south of Currambine and 130 kilometres per hour (81 mph) north of Currambine. The line uses automatic train protection and is signalled to allow for headways as low as three minutes using fixed block signalling. As part of the High Capacity Signalling Project, Alstom and DT Infrastructure will replace the signalling system with Alstom's Urbalis communications-based train control (CBTC) system, allowing for lower headways. As of 2026, this is planned to be operational in 2030.

=== Route ===
The Yanchep line runs from Perth Underground station in the south to Yanchep station in the north, a distance of 54.5 kilometres (33.9 mi). South of Perth Underground station, the line continues as the Mandurah line, although services in the William Street tunnel between Perth Underground and Elizabeth Quay stations are considered to be part of the Yanchep line and Mandurah line simultaneously.

North of Perth Underground station, the tunnel curves westward, passing under the Fremantle line tunnel by 1.2 metres (4 ft), before surfacing parallel to the Fremantle line, 0.6 kilometres (0.4 mi) from Perth Underground station. At 0.9 kilometres (0.6 mi), the Yanchep line dives down to enter a short tunnel and bend north to pass under Roe Street and enter the freeway's median strip. The Yanchep line continues along the Mitchell Freeway for 23 kilometres (14 mi) until it reaches Joondalup. There are seven stations along this section: Leederville, Glendalough, Stirling, Warwick, Greenwood, Whitfords, and Edgewater. South of Leederville and north of Whitfords stations are turnback sidings for trains to change direction.

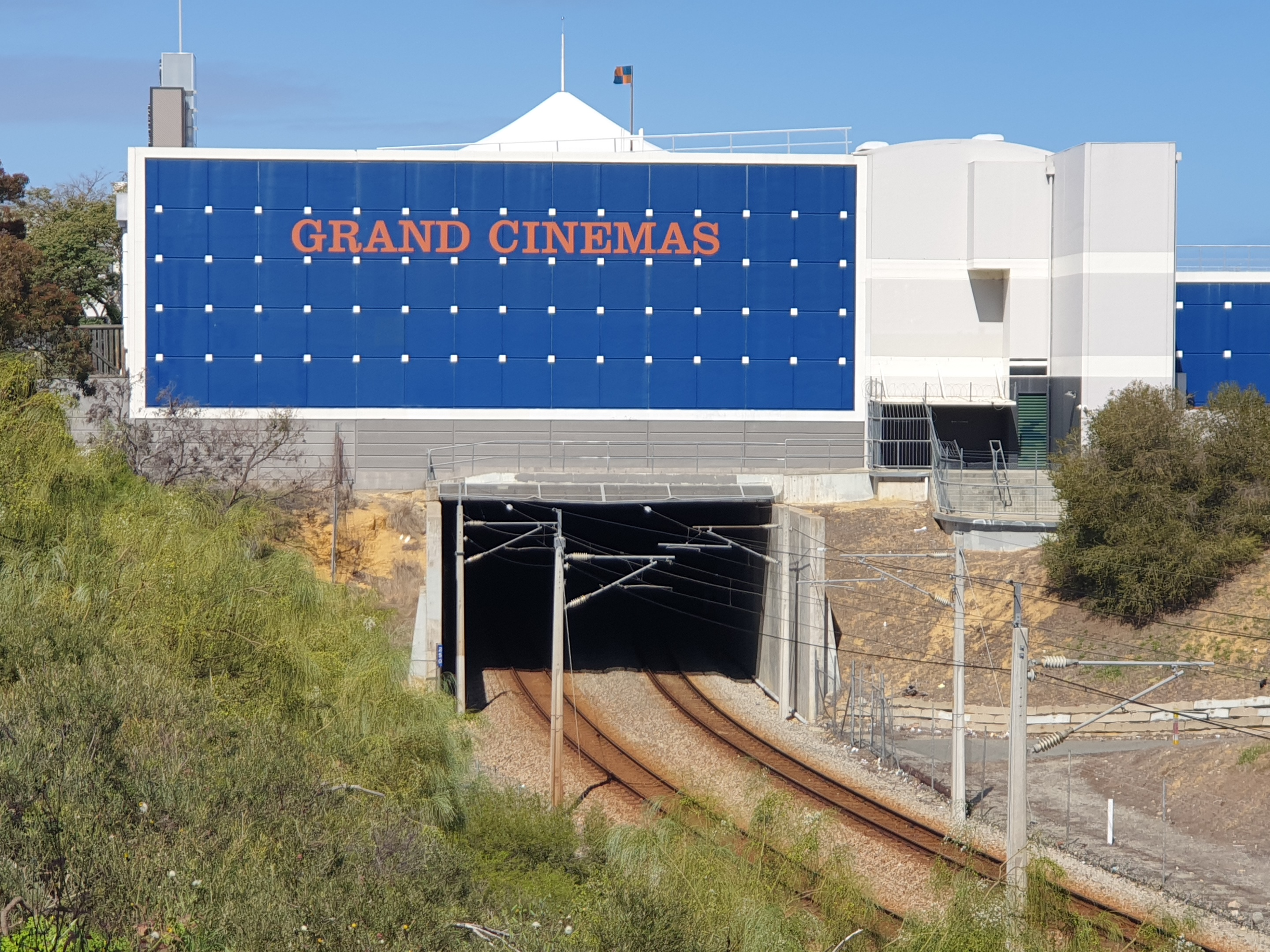
The Yanchep line passing under Lakeside Joondalup Shopping Centre, September 2020

At the 24.6-kilometre (15.3 mi) mark, the Yanchep line enters a short tunnel to exit the Mitchell Freeway median strip for a 3.3-kilometre (2.1 mi) deviation through Joondalup. For this section, the railway line is in a cutting below ground level. North of Joondalup station, the Yanchep line passes under the Lakeside Joondalup Shopping Centre, before bending west and north to enter a tunnel and reach the freeway's median again.

North of Joondalup, the Yanchep line has two stations in the freeway median: Currambine and Clarkson. North of Clarkson station is the Nowergup depot, which is between the two main lines. At 38.8 kilometres (24.1 mi), the Yanchep line exits the Mitchell Freeway median for the last time, entering the residential suburb of Butler. The remaining 16 kilometres (9.9 mi) of the Yanchep line is largely within a cutting below ground level, passing through developing residential areas and bushland. There are four stations: Butler, Alkimos, Eglinton, and Yanchep, where the line terminates. North of Yanchep station are tracks to stow trains.

=== Stations ===
All stations on the Yanchep line are fully accessible except for Leederville, Stirling, and Edgewater stations, which have platform gaps that are too large. Leederville station also has a ramp that is too steep. All stations except Greenwood, Edgewater, and Currambine have bus interchanges. All platforms are approximately 150 metres (490 ft) long, allowing six-car trains to stop at all stations.

List of stations
Station	Image	Distance from Perth		Location	Opened	Connections
Station	Image	km	mi	Location	Opened	Connections
Elizabeth Quay	Elizabeth Quay station underground platform	−0.6	−0.4	Perth CBD	15 October 2007	Bus at Elizabeth Quay bus station Services continue on the Mandurah line
Perth Underground	Perth Underground station concourse	0.0	0.0	Perth CBD	15 October 2007	Bus at Perth Busport; Australind, Airport, Armadale, Ellenbrook, Fremantle, Midland and Thornlie–Cockburn lines
Leederville	Leederville station platform	2.4	1.5	Leederville, West Leederville	20 December 1992	Bus
Glendalough	Glendalough station platform	5.6	3.5	Glendalough, Osborne Park, Mount Hawthorn	21 February 1993	Bus
Stirling	Stirling station platform	8.8	5.5	Innaloo, Osborne Park, Stirling	21 February 1993	Bus
Warwick	Warwick station platform	14.5	9.0	Carine, Duncraig, Hamersley, Warwick	28 February 1993	Bus
Greenwood	Greenwood station platforms	17.7	11.0	Duncraig, Greenwood, Kingsley, Padbury	29 January 2005	
Whitfords	Whitfords station platform	19.8	12.3	Craigie, Kingsley, Padbury, Woodvale	14 February 1993	Bus
Edgewater	Edgewater station platform	22.9	14.2	Edgewater, Heathridge	20 December 1992	
Joondalup	Joondalup station platform in a trench	26.2	16.3	Joondalup	20 December 1992	Bus
Currambine	Currambine station platform	29.2	18.1	Currambine, Joondalup	8 August 1993	
Clarkson	Clarkson station platform	33.2	20.6	Clarkson	4 October 2004	Bus
Butler	Butler station building	40.7	25.3	Butler	21 September 2014	Bus
Alkimos	Alkimos station platforms	43.0	26.7	Alkimos	14 July 2024	Bus
Eglinton	Eglinton station platforms	46.7	29.0	Eglinton	14 July 2024	Bus
Yanchep	Yanchep station platforms	54.5	33.9	Yanchep	14 July 2024	Bus

== Service ==
Transperth train services are operated by the Public Transport Authority's Transperth Train Operations division. Prior to 2003, it was operated by Westrail under contract to Transperth. (Note: Transperth was the operating name of the Metropolitan Transport Trust from 1986 to 1995. From 1995 to 2003, Transperth was part of the Department of Transport. Since 2003, Transperth has been part of the Public Transport Authority.) Yanchep line train headways reach as low as five minutes during peak, increasing to fifteen minutes outside peak and on weekends, and half-an-hour to an hour at night. During peak, some services terminate or commence at Whitfords or Clarkson stations. The travel time from Yanchep station to Perth Underground station is 49 minutes. On weeknights, the last train arrives at Yanchep station at 1:06 am and the first train departs at 4:38 am. On Saturday and Sunday nights, the last train arrives at Yanchep station at 3:04 am and the first train departs at 5:05 am on Saturdays and 6:28 am on Sundays. During events at Perth Stadium, additional services operate along the Yanchep line direct to Perth Stadium station, bypassing Perth station.

Before January 2016, express services operated on the Yanchep line during peak periods to manage overcrowding. The introduction of more B-series sets enabled most trains during peak periods to be six cars long, increasing capacity and allowing all services to stop at all stations from 31 January 2016 onwards. Before then, some peak trains from Perth to Butler or Clarkson skipped Leederville and Glendalough, and trains from Perth to Whitfords skipped Greenwood. Before June 2009, services terminating at Whitfords operated off-peak as well, making for 7½-minute headways between Perth and Whitfords during the day. The Perth to Whitfords service is sometimes known as the Whitfords shuttle. These services were withdrawn to save money. From 2031, peak frequencies on the Yanchep line are planned to reach 18 trains per hour, which will be enabled by C-series trains having three doors per car, which reduces dwell times compared to B-series trains, and the communications-based train control signalling upgrade.

=== Rolling stock ===
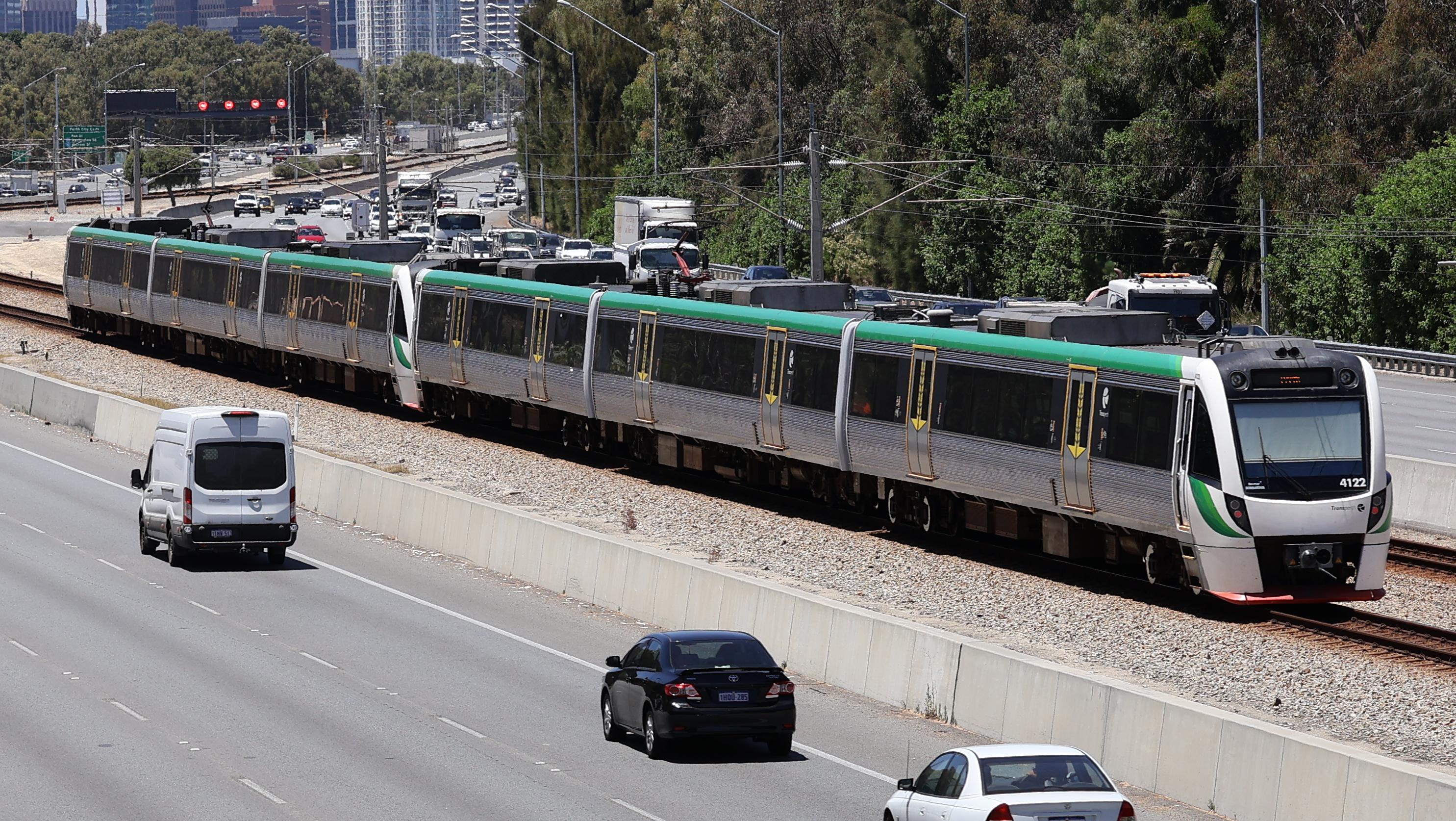
A B-series train near Galup (Lake Monger)

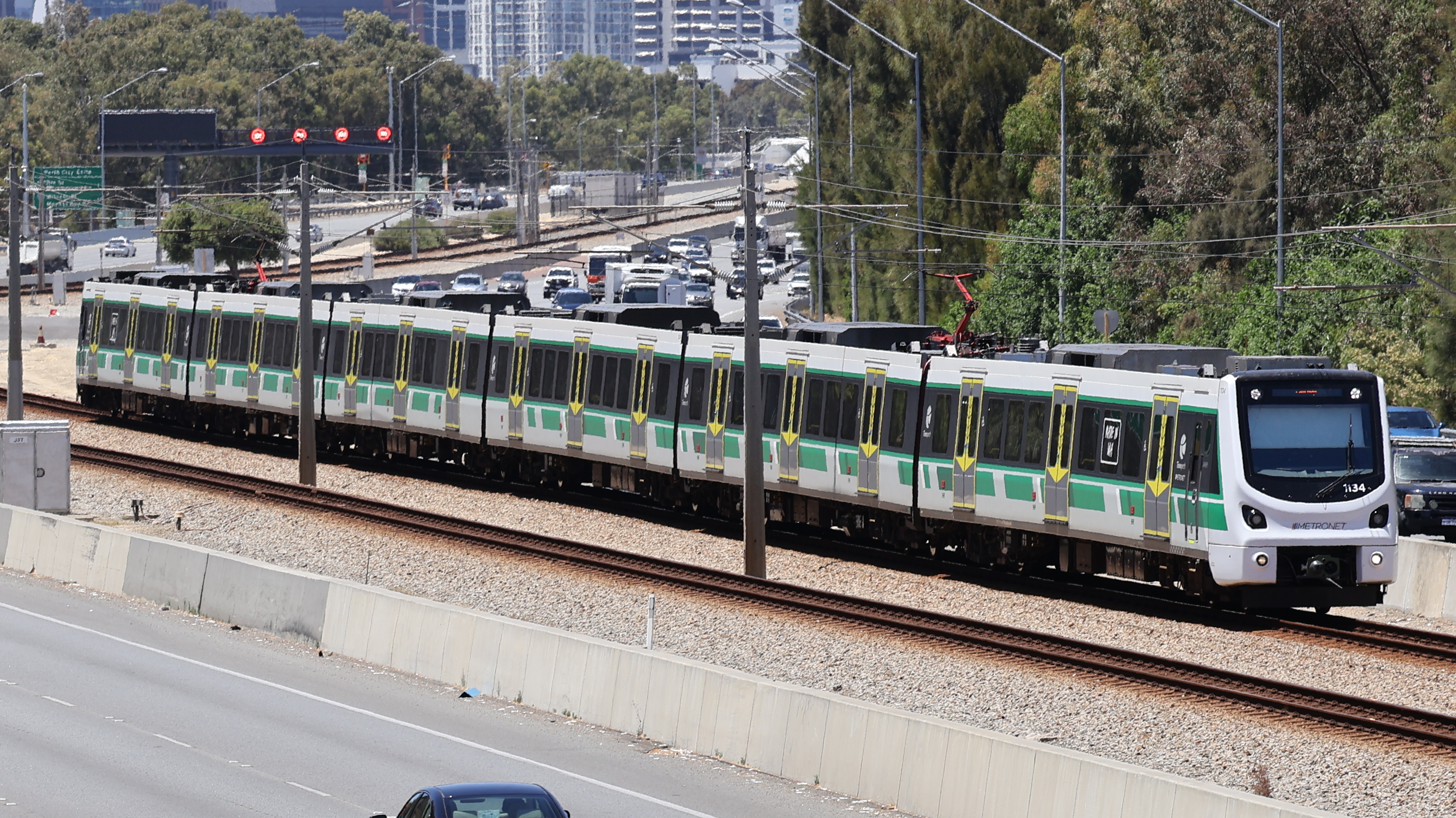
A C-series train near Galup (Lake Monger)

The main rolling stock used on the Yanchep line is Transperth B-series and C-series trains, with A-series trains sometimes used. The A-series trains entered service between 1991 and 1999, have a maximum speed of 110 kilometres per hour (68 mph), and consist of two cars which are usually joined to form four-car trains. Each car has two doors on each side. The B-series trains entered service between 2004 and 2019, have a maximum speed of 130 kilometres per hour (81 mph), and consist of three cars which are usually joined to form six-car trains. Each car has two doors per side. The C-series trains have been entering service since 2024, have a maximum speed of 130 kilometres per hour (81 mph), and consist of six cars with three doors on the side of each car.

In 1989, twenty-two A-series sets were ordered from ABB and Walkers Limited as an extension to their existing contract for the delivery of railcars for the electrification of the other lines. Five more A-series sets were delivered in 1998 and 1999 to increase capacity. These trains are stored and maintained at Claisebrook depot in East Perth; a small number were also stored at Currambine station before the Clarkson extension opened.

In May 2002, the government signed a contract with EDI Rail and Bombardier Transportation for the construction of Nowergup depot and the delivery and maintenance of thirty-one three-car B-series trains to be used on the Joondalup and Mandurah lines. The first five B-series trains entered service when the Clarkson extension opened on 4 October 2004. The first six-car trains ran on 31 December 2004 for the Whitfords shuttle. In December 2006, the government ordered fifteen more B-series trains. The first of the additional railcars entered service in June 2009, allowing for some A-series trains to be transferred to other lines. In July 2011, a further fifteen B-series trains were ordered. This order eventually increased to twenty-two. The first of these trains entered service in December 2013. By the end of that order, all A-series trains had been transferred to other lines and almost every peak hour train on the Joondalup line was six-cars long.

In December 2019, the government signed a contract with Alstom for the delivery and maintenance of forty-one C-series trains to replace the A-series trains and provide the rolling stock required for network expansions such the Yanchep extension. The C-series trains have three doors on the side of each car, decreasing dwell times. The first C-series train entered service on the Joondalup and Mandurah lines on 8 April 2024. The C-series trains are planned to only be used on the Yanchep and Mandurah lines initially, with B-series trains transferred to other lines to replace the retiring A-series trains.

=== Patronage ===
Yanchep line annual patronage
Year	Patronage	±%
2010–11	15,611,836	—
2011–12	16,700,234	+6.97%
2012–13	17,449,891	+4.49%
2013–14	16,897,361	−3.17%
2014–15	17,105,797	+1.23%
2015–16	16,917,029	−1.10%
2016–17	16,658,559	−1.53%
2017–18	16,477,387	−1.09%
2018–19	16,531,788	+0.33%
2019–20	13,374,710	−19.10%
2020–21	11,885,779	−11.13%
2021–22	11,752,572	−1.12%
2022–23	14,045,991	+19.51%
2023–24	16,135,201	+14.87%
2024–25	16,614,973	+2.97%
2025–26	17,237,539	+3.75%

The 1989 master plan projected the Joondalup line would receive 41,000 boardings per day by 2001. By June 1993, approximately 24,200 passengers were using the Joondalup line on an average weekday, of which 56 percent travelled during peak. In the 1993–94 financial year, (Note: An Australian financial year is from 1 July to 30 June the following year.) the first full year since the Joondalup line opened, the line received 8,221,000 passengers, significantly more than predicted. Patronage on the whole system almost doubled from 13.6 million in the previous financial year to 22.9 million. By 2003, patronage was short of projections by four thousand boardings per day.

The Clarkson extension's opening in 2004 resulted in a significant increase in patronage. Upon the Mandurah line's opening in 2007, the Joondalup line was relegated to being Perth's second-most-used line, while also causing another significant increase in patronage, reaching a peak of 17,449,891 boardings in 2012–13. Following years of growth, the Joondalup line's patronage decreased in 2013–14, due to shutdowns relating to the Perth City Link and economic factors. The line recorded a small increase in patronage the following financial year with the opening of the extension to Butler, but patronage declined over the following three years due to economic conditions. In the 2018–19 financial year, patronage was increasing again, but the COVID-19 pandemic's onset in 2020 resulted in a massive decrease, reaching a low of 11,752,572 boardings in 2021–22. By the line's 30th anniversary on 20 December 2022, over 381 million trips had been made. In the latest financial year, 2025–26, there were 17,237,539 boardings on the Yanchep line.

Within nine days of opening, Butler station had reached its goal of two thousand boardings per day. By August 2015, the combined bus and train patronage within the surrounding area was up by thirteen percent. On the other hand, by March 2025, the three stations on the Yanchep Rail Extension were receiving about 1,900 boardings per weekday in total, and in July 2025, 1,691 boardings per weekday, well below the 5,200 boardings expected upon opening.

The busiest stations on the Yanchep line as of 2018, excluding Perth Underground and Elizabeth Quay, are Warwick, Joondalup, Stirling, and Whitfords. The least-busiest are Currambine, Edgewater, and Greenwood. Warwick and Joondalup were the fourth and fifth busiest stations in Perth in October 2017, with 5,125 and 4,791 boardings per day respectively.
