= A. E. Clarke =

Architect

Arthur Edward Clarke
- Born: 13 April 1860
- Occupation: Architect
- Spouse: Janet Burton Badcock (m. 1882)
- Buildings: Western Australian School of Mines; Leederville Town Hall

Arthur Edward Clarke (born 13 April 1860) was a Victorian architect who emigrated to Western Australia in the late 1890s and practised in Kalgoorlie.

Clarke was born in Topsham, Devon, to John Robert Clarke and Maria Clarke. He was already working as an architect at the age of 20. In 1882, he married Janet Burton Badcock in Devon.

His works included the School of Mines in Western Australia, and the Leederville Town Hall.
