= West Leederville, Western Australia =

West Leederville Perth, Western Australia
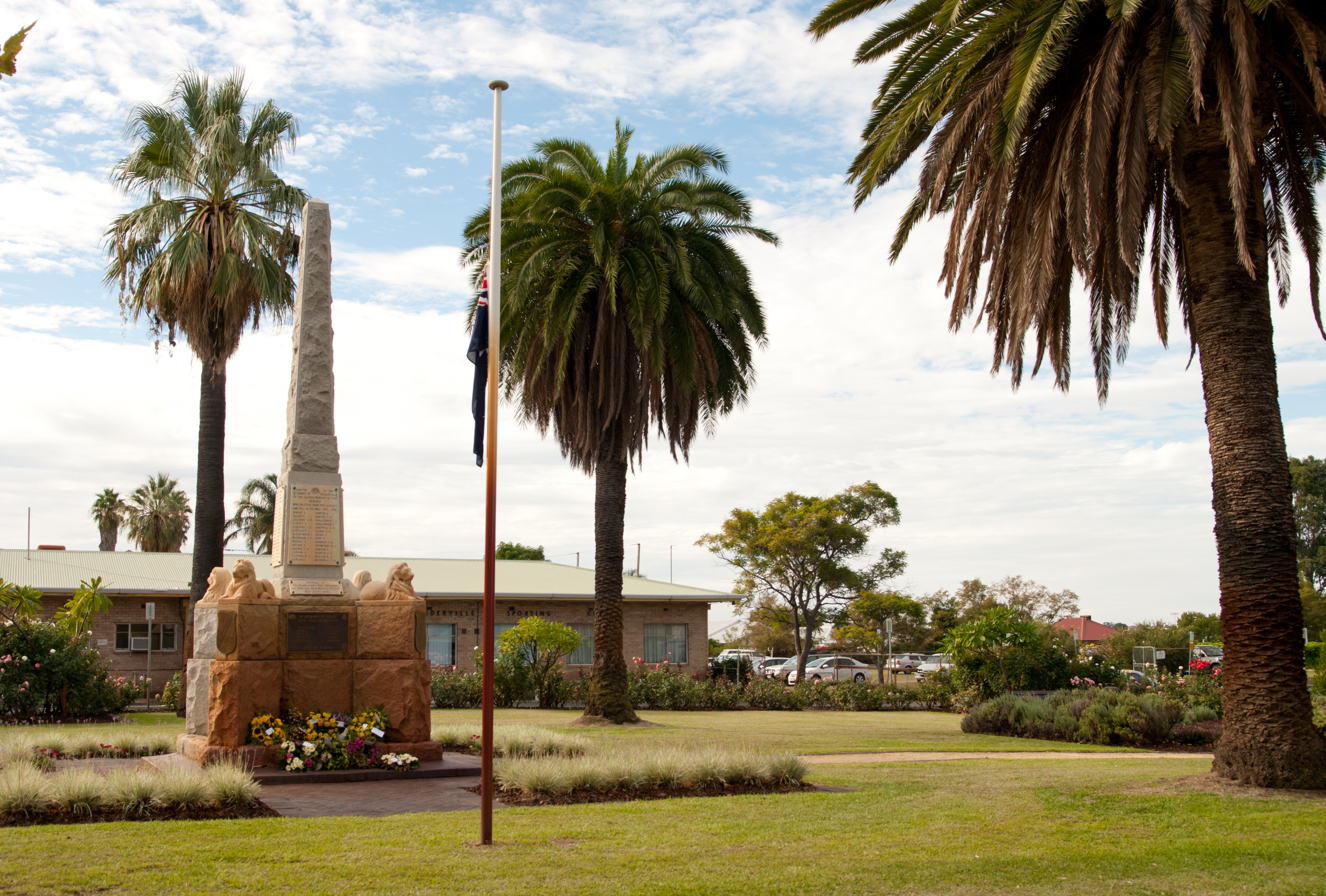
- Fallen Soldiers Memorial, West Leederville
- Coordinates: 31.938°S 115.832°E
- Population: 4,340 (SAL 2021)
- Established: 1890s
- Postcode(s): 6007
- Area: 1.4 km^{2} (0.5 sq mi)
- Location: 3 km (2 mi) NW of the Perth CBD
- LGA(s): Town of Cambridge
- State electorate(s): Churchlands
- Federal division(s): Curtin
Suburbs around West Leederville:
Wembley	Lake Monger	Leederville
Wembley	West Leederville	Leederville
Subiaco	Subiaco	West Perth

West Leederville is a suburb 3 kilometres (1.9 mi) northwest of the central business district of Perth, the capital of Western Australia, and is within the Town of Cambridge. It used to be integrated with Leederville prior to the construction of the Mitchell Freeway through the suburb in 1972.

The tiny section east of Southport Street is a commercial area with several warehouses, taking advantage of its location at the end of the Graham Farmer Freeway. The rest of the suburb is medium-density residential. The suburb backs onto Subiaco Oval and St John of God Subiaco Hospital. Many of the original residences still stand, with most being renovated next to newer double storey dwellings, leafy streets with some properties gaining views of the city. "Hill of Tara" is a newer subdivision with larger homes on bigger blocks, with many affording view of Lake Monger.

It is served by a bus service along Cambridge Street and the Leederville train station (Yanchep line) and West Leederville train station (Fremantle line).

== History ==
West Leederville, though informally known by that name for many years, was officially gazetted as a suburb in 1998.

West Leederville is the earliest area of residential subdivision in the Town of Cambridge. It was originally formed from the sale and subdivision of the estate of William Henry Leeder that occurred from 1891. West Leederville Primary School was founded in 1898. Most of West Leederville's residential land was subdivided prior to 1903.

The Home of the Good Shepherd Convent (now the Catholic Education Centre) was established in 1903 by the Good Shepherd Sisters.

Most of West Leederville was well developed with houses before 1925.

Until the 1950s, a tram ran down Woolwich Street. With a one in fourteen gradient, Woolwich Street was one of the steepest tram lines in the city.

Subdivision of the Hill of Tara occurred in the 1990s when land was released around the Catholic Education Centre in Ruislip Street.

== Leederville Town Hall and Recreation Complex ==
The Leederville Town Hall & Recreation Complex is bounded by Holyrood Street, Tower Street and Cambridge Street. It forms a central focus of West Leederville. It is historically significant in the development of Leederville and the surrounding district, and was developed in response to the rapid expansion of the suburb prior to the First World War. It was designed by A. E. Clarke and built in 1916 by local builder, W. H. Roberts.

The Leederville Bowling Club was established to the rear of the Leederville Town Hall in 1906, and continues to operate both as a bowling club and a social venue. The bowling club was the first sporting facility established on the site and was developed in association with the Excelsior Masonic Lodge.

The Fallen Soldier’s Memorial was designed and executed in 1924 by Pietro Porcelli.

The Leederville Croquet Club operated on the site from 1908 until 2006.

In 2007 the West Leederville Residents Association began a community garden on an unused area of council land next to the bowling club.

== Transport ==
=== Bus ===
- Green CAT Leederville Station to Elizabeth Quay Bus Station (free service) – only serves Leederville Station

Bus routes serving Cambridge Street:

- 81, 82, 83 and 84 Perth Busport to City Beach
- 85 Perth Busport to Glendalough Station
- 96 Leederville Station to University of Western Australia South

=== Rail ===
- Fremantle Line
  - West Leederville Station
- Yanchep Line
  - Leederville Station

== Notable residents ==
Future prime minister Bob Hawke lived on Tate Street, West Leederville, during his childhood.
