= Western Australian School of Mines =

School in Western Australia

Coordinates: 30.74849°S 121.47413°E

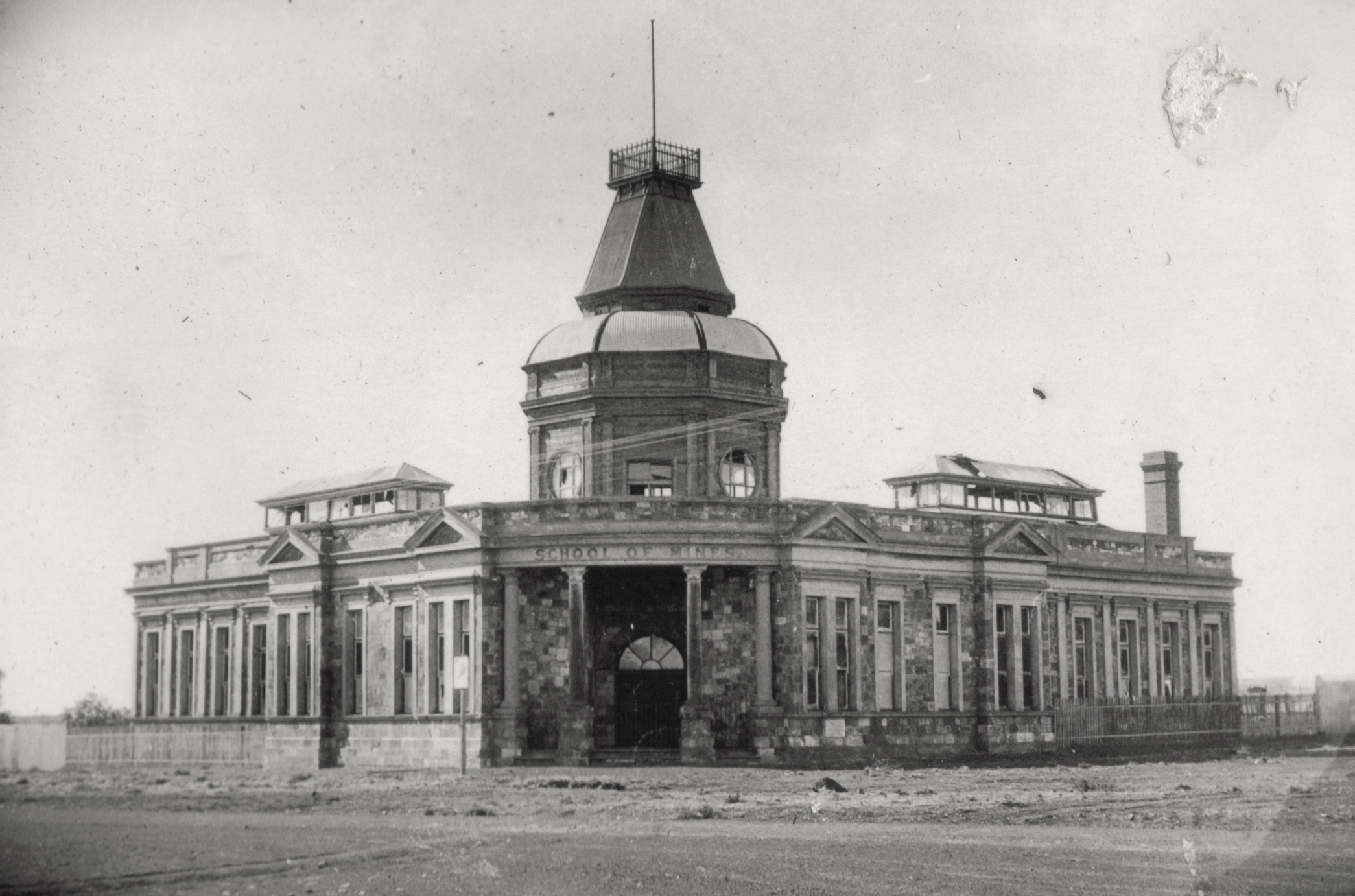
School of Mines building, Coolgardie, c. 1929

Western Australian School of Mines (WASM) was founded in 1902 as the Kalgoorlie School of Mines.

It was a tertiary school specialising in subjects directly related to the Western Australian mining industry. Originally located in Coolgardie, WASM later moved to Kalgoorlie and continued to be primarily funded from independent sources. In 1969 the Department of Mines transferred management of WASM to Western Australian Institute of Technology, which later became Curtin University.

== History ==
The original school was initially set up at Coolgardie in a building erected for the International Mining and Industrial Exhibition of 1899. It moved to Kalgoorlie in 1903 after state government funds were released. The following description appeared in the Western Argus on 7 June 1903:

The first week in October should see the completion of the Kalgoorlie School of Mines building, which is now being erected in Egan Street, next to the Chamber of Mines. It is a spacious structure with a frontage of 135ft. 2in. and a depth of 117ft. 4in., and when completed will be a handsome addition to the many big buildings in this city. In front there will be a verandah with a concrete floor 10ft. in depth and 76ft. in length. Then there will come the main entrance hall, close on the left of which is to be the senior laboratory, and on the right the secretary's office, lobby, lecturer', assistants', and directory rooms. The extreme right will be taken up by a class room, preparation room, lecture hall, and drawing office. [...]. On the extreme left side will be the furnace, assay, metallurgists' laboratory, laboratory assistants' and balance rooms, and at the back will be another balance room, lobby, and the caretaker's and class rooms. There is also space for central courtyard. Altogether there will be 16 fume covers, 11 melting furnaces, and six muffle and assay furnaces, and for carrying off smoke from these, a large chimney stack is to be built. A drainage scheme is provided for throughout. Mr. A. E. Clarke is the architect, and Messrs. W. and J. Park are the contractors for the work.

The school was administered by the Department of Mines until 1969 when it became a branch of the Western Australian Institute of Technology (now Curtin University), when its name was changed.

== Current ==
The School currently offers undergraduate and postgraduate degrees in:

- Applied geology,
- Spatial sciences (including mine surveying),
- Exploration geophysics,
- Mining engineering,
- Metallurgical engineering (the first year engineering must be undertaken at the Bentley Campus, second year at either campus, then the final year(s) at WASM in Kalgoorlie)
- Mining geology (first two years must be undertaken at the Bentley Campus, final year in Kalgoorlie)
- Mine surveying (first two years must be undertaken at the Bentley Campus, final year in Kalgoorlie)

The Mining Engineering degree in 2007 combined with University of New South Wales and University of Queensland to form the industry-funded Minerals Education Australia (MEA) Program. The University of Adelaide joined MEA in 2011.
