= Edgewater railway station =

Railway station in Perth, Western Australia

Edgewater
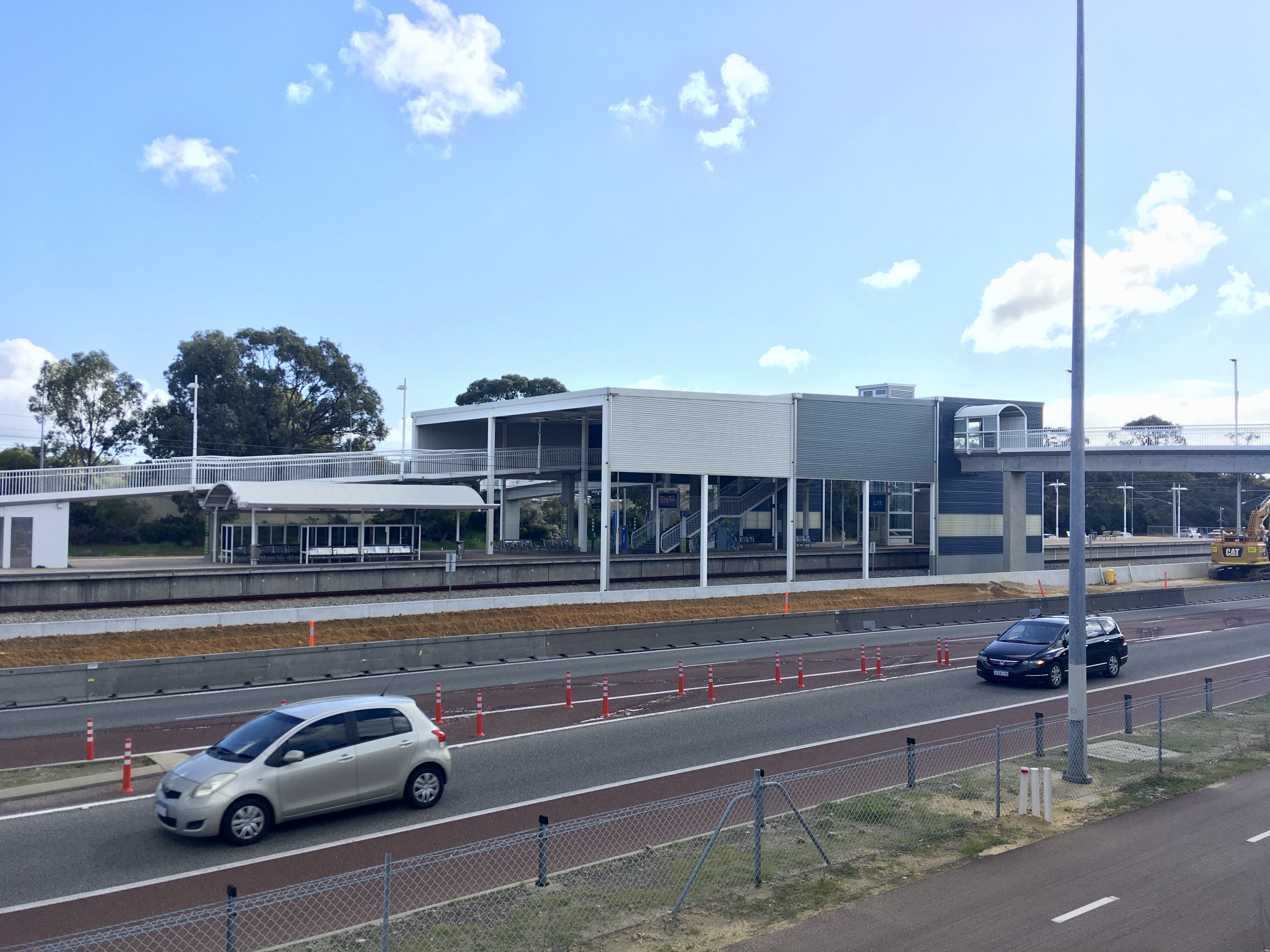
- Eastbound view of Edgewater railway station entrance, shelter and platform, August 2021

General information
- Location: Mitchell Freeway, Edgewater; Australia
- Coordinates: 31°46′19″S 115°46′44″E
- Owner: Public Transport Authority
- Operator: Transperth
- Line: Yanchep line
- Distance: 22.9 km (14.2 mi) from Perth
- Platforms: 2 (1 island)
- Tracks: 2

Construction
- Structure type: Ground
- Accessible: Yes

Other information
- Station code: JER; 99861 (platform 1); 99862 (platform 2)
- Fare zone: 3

History
- Opened: 20 December 1992

Passengers
- March 2018: 2,100 per day

Services
Preceding station	Transperth	Following station
Whitfords towards Elizabeth Quay via Perth Underground	Yanchep line All, K	Joondalup towards Clarkson or Yanchep
Location
- Location of Edgewater railway station

Edgewater railway station is a railway station on the Transperth network. It is located on the Yanchep line, 22.9 kilometres (14.2 mi) from Perth station, serving the suburb of Edgewater.

== History ==
Edgewater station was built by Sabemo under a $1.5 million contract was awarded in July 1992. Construction was expected to be complete by early October 1992. The platform walls and footbridge were constructed under an earlier contract with McMahon Kanny.

Edgewater station opened on 20 December 1992 in the median strip of the Mitchell Freeway.

In 2003, the contract for extending the platforms on seven Joondalup line (now Yanchep line) stations, including Edgewater station, was awarded to Lakis Constructions. The platforms on these stations had to be extended by 50 metres (160 ft) to accommodate 150-metre-long (490 ft) six-car trains, which were planned to enter service. Along with the extensions, the platform edges were upgraded to bring them into line with tactile paving standards. Edgewater was the second station to begin being extended, with work commencing in December 2003. Work at this station was completed by April 2004.

In 2010, a new canopy replaced the original. In 2015, construction commenced on a $26 million multi-level car park. The car park consists of three levels, with 75 CCTV cameras, 445 lights, 3 duress buttons, as well a facade screening covering half the building. The car park opened on 22 January 2017, increasing the station's total parking capacity to more than 1,450 bays.

== Services ==
Edgewater station is served by Transperth Yanchep line services.

Edgewater station saw 530,906 passengers in the 2013–2014 financial year. In March 2018, Edgewater station had approximately 2,100 boardings per weekday, making it the joint least busiest station on the Yanchep line, alongside Currambine.

== Platforms ==
Edgewater platform arrangement
Stop ID	Platform	Line	Service Pattern	Destination	Via	Notes
99861	1	Yanchep line	All stations, K	Elizabeth Quay	Perth Underground	
99862	2	Yanchep line	All stations	Yanchep		
99862	2	Yanchep line	K	Clarkson		
