= List of State Register of Heritage Places in the City of Wanneroo =

The State Register of Heritage Places is maintained by the Heritage Council of Western Australia. As of 2026, 204 places are heritage-listed in the City of Wanneroo, of which 34 are on the State Register of Heritage Places.

== List ==
The Western Australian State Register of Heritage Places, as of 2026, lists the following 34 state registered places within the City of Wanneroo:

Place name	Place #	Street number	Street name	Suburb or town	Co-ordinates	Notes & former names	Photo
Buckingham House	2674	10F	Neville Drive	Wanneroo	31.743415°S 115.795834°E	Buckingham Homestead, Pioneer Activity Centre for School Groups	
Cockman House	2675	1230	Ocean Reef Road	Wanneroo	31.783857°S 115.806176°E		
Yanchep National Park Gloucester Lodge and Pool	2677	3499	Wanneroo Road	Yanchep	31.543048°S 115.687628°E	Named after Prince Henry, Duke of Gloucester	
Yanchep National Park Yanchep Inn	2678	3499	Wanneroo Road	Yanchep	31.544345°S 115.683244°E		
Yanchep National Park Tram Cottage	2679	3499	Wanneroo Road	Yanchep	31.543021°S 115.688003°E		
Yanchep National Park McNess Guest House	2680	3499	Wanneroo Road	Yanchep	31.546570°S 115.683974°E		
Yanchep National Park Ghost House Ruin, Chauffeur's Room and Garage	2681	3499	Wanneroo Road	Yanchep	31.515442°S 115.663791°E	Shapcott's House (former)	
Yanchep National Park Army Bunkers - Radar Installation	2682	3499	Wanneroo Road	Yanchep	31.5335°S 115.6906°E		
Yanchep National Park Administration Building	2683	3499	Wanneroo Road	Yanchep	31.547152°S 115.684429°E		
Yanchep National Park Recreation Hall Site	2685	1	Indian Ocean Drive	Yanchep	31.544037°S 115.674361°E		
Yanchep National Park Precinct	4151	3499	Wanneroo Road	Yanchep		McNess Recreation Area	
Lime Kilns - Cooper's (12 & 12A)	4558	Lot 693	Anchorage Drive	Mindarie Keys	31.685159°S 115.703937°E	Limestone quarry, Kiln 12, 12A (Cooper)	
Perry's Paddock, Cottage & Stables	9484	1170	Ocean Reef Road	Wanneroo	31.783320°S 115.801019°E		
Yanchep National Park Crystal Caves	9529	3499	Wanneroo Road	Yanchep	31.547543°S 115.692611°E		
Yanchep National Park Avenue of Trees	9531		Yanchep Road	Yanchep	31.552141°S 115.687973°E		
Yanchep National Park Yanchep War Memorial	14275			Yanchep National Park	31.544291°S 115.683652°E		
Yanchep National Park Generator Bunkers - Radar Installation	14278	3499	Wanneroo Road	Yanchep	31.535997°S 115.686713°E		
North West Stock Route (former) Stage 1	15873			Yanchep and Gingin		Stock Route, Champion Bay Stock Route, Old North Road, Coastal Stock Route, Old North	
Two Rocks Shopping Centre and Tavern	16771		Sovereign Drive	Two Rocks	31.495639°S 115.585155°E	Two Rocks Town Centre	
Two Rocks Police Complex	17395		Enterprise Avenue	Two Rocks	31.495520°S 115.584534°E		
Atlantis Marine Park (former)	17523	10	Enterprise Avenue	Two Rocks	31.496595°S 115.586730°E		
Olive Trees, Perry's Paddock	17919			Wanneroo	31.783320°S 115.801019°E		
King Neptune Sculpture	17935		Enterprise Avenue	Two Rocks	31.496389°S 115.586411°E		
School House - old	17937		Perry's Paddock	Woodvale	31.783320°S 115.801019°E	Also listed under 26677, moved to Perry's Paddock in 1992 and next to Buckingham House in 2009	
Sun City Land Sales Office (former)	17939	Pt Lot 50	Sovereign Drive	Two Rocks	31.498176°S 115.584908°E	Removed after 2009	
Two Rocks Limestone Retaining Wall	17941		Pope Street & Enterprise Avenue	Two Rocks	31.496352°S 115.584464°E		
Two Rocks Marina	17942	Lot 8976	Pope Street	Two Rocks	31.496907°S 115.582682°E		
Two Rocks Shopping Centre	17943	10 & 20	Enterprise Avenue	Two Rocks	31.495357°S 115.584270°E		
Two Rocks Tavern	17944	20	Enterprise Avenue	Two Rocks	31.496157°S 115.584736°E		
Waugal Monoliths	17948	10	Enterprise Avenue	Two Rocks	31.495879°S 115.584764°E		
Yanchep National Park Yanchep Golf Clubhouse	17950		Lot 11544	Yanchep National Park	31.542010°S 115.683080°E		
Boongarra Government Well	18095		State Forest off Wanneroo Road	Wilbinga	31.464233°S 115.662939°E	Boongarra Swamp, Boongarra Well	
North West Stock Route (former)	24914			Yanchep			
Sun City Precinct, Two Rocks	26470			Two Rocks	31.495868°S 115.585643°E		
