= Two Rocks Village =

- Construction of the Two Rocks Village
- Location: Two Rocks, Western Australia, Australia
- Coordinates: 31.4974°S 115.5866°E
- Opened: 10 June 2026
- Manager: Erceg Management
- Owner: Erceg Management
- Num. of stores: 14
- Floor area: 500 m^{2} (5,400 sq ft)
- Floors: 1
- Parking: 200
- Website: Official website

Two Rocks Village is a shopping centre located in the Perth suburb of Two Rocks, approximately 61 kilometres (38 mi) from Perth CBD, in Western Australia. It is owned and managed by Erceg Management, and has around 15 stores, including Woolworths, BWS, Jamaica Blue, and other small business stores.

The shopping centre is located in the same area where the former Atlantis Marine Park was situated. Because of the perceived heritage value of the site, the development had faced opposition from the local community before its construction.

== History and development ==
As well as being the former location of Atlantis Marine Park, the suburb of Two Rocks was also a hub of Alan Bond's failed Yanchep Sun City development plan in the 1970s and 1980s. Sun City was the state's first private residential, commercial and recreational investment project. In recognition of this, the Sun City precinct, which encompasses a marina and an existing adjacent shopping centre as well as Mark Le Buse's King Neptune sculpture and the former site of Atlantis Marine Park, was added to the State Register of Heritage Places in January 2023.

Due to the perceived heritage value of the site, any future development to the area had faced backlash from the local community. The shopping centre project was first announced in December 2021; the announcement was met with a 1202 signatory petition that objected the development application, while a separate February 2022 petition presented to Parliament by Member for Butler John Quigley garnered over 1100 signatures from people who believed the proposed shopping centre development "failed to adequately respond to the recognised tourism and historical value" of the site.

Following public consultation and adjustments, the project was approved in May 2022 by the Metro Outer Joint Development Assessment Panel. Following this, the Australian Heritage Council reviewed community requests for a stop-work order; they ultimately advised the Heritage Minister that a stop-work order was not warranted, finding the project would not cause imminent damage to the surrounding Sun City precinct. Later that year, Woolworths submitted an amendment to the original approval to tweak the layout. Changes included reconfiguring specialty shops, adding extra car parking bays, adjusting the office footprint, and modifying the "direct to boot" canopy structure.

In late 2025, construction works officially commenced on-site after the land had been sitting clear since 2021. The shopping centre opened on 10 June 2026. At its opening, Erceg general manager Rob Staniford asserted that the centre will provide "convenient fresh food and essential services for locals, as well as new jobs”.

== Architectural features ==
The architectural design of the shopping centre blends the late-twentieth-century "Yanchep Sun City" resort design with contemporary coastal development. The village is highly distinct due to its heritage-listed structures, maritime styling, and integration with the coastal landscape.
