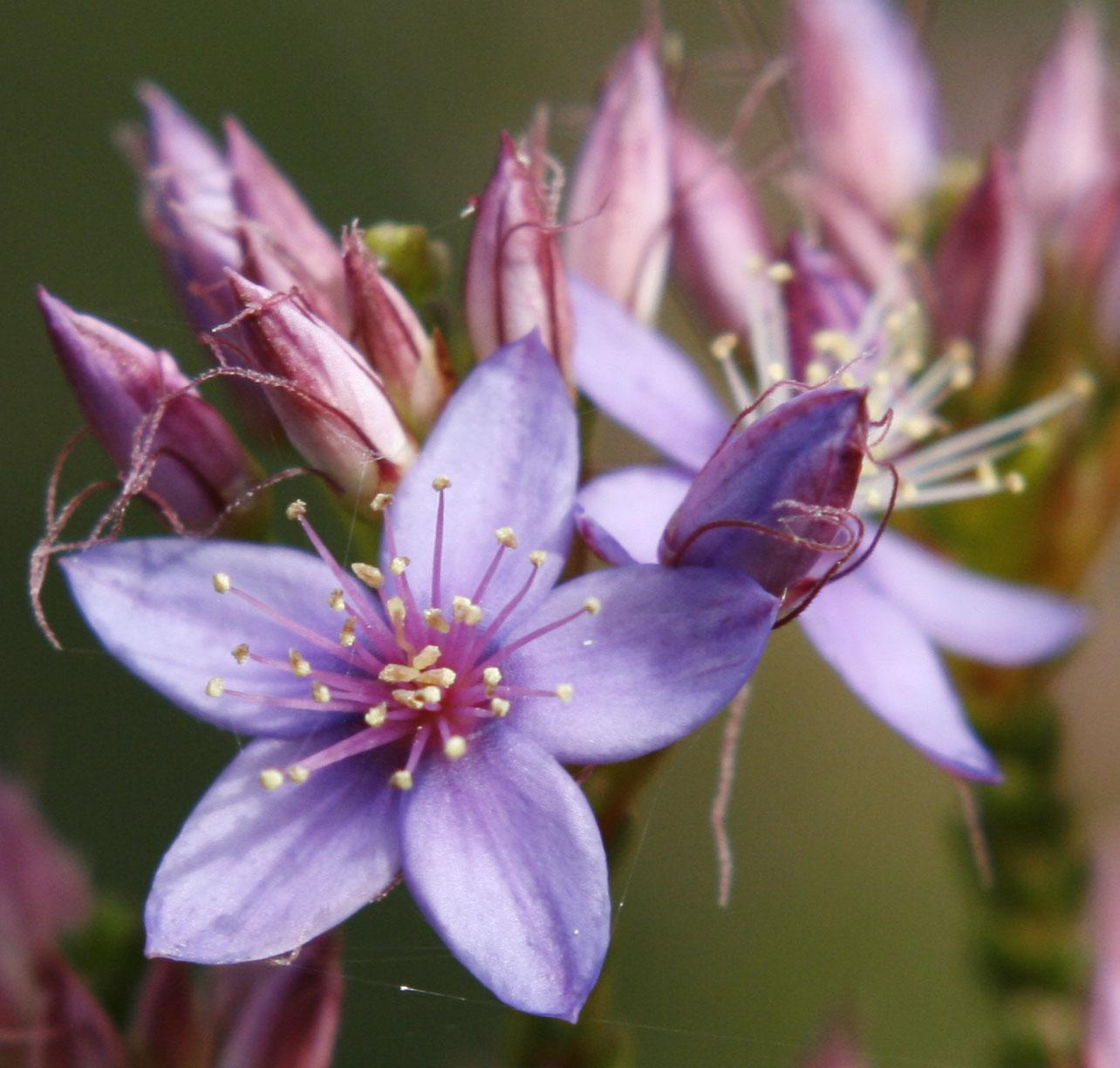

Scientific classification
- Kingdom: Plantae
- Clade: Tracheophytes
- Clade: Angiosperms
- Clade: Eudicots
- Clade: Rosids
- Order: Myrtales
- Family: Myrtaceae
- Genus: Calytrix
- Species: C. sapphirina

Binomial name
- Calytrix sapphirina Lindl.

Synonyms
- Calycothrix empetroides Schauer; Calycothrix lasiostachya F.Muell.; Calycothrix sapphirina (Lindl.) Schauer; Calythrix empetroides Benth. orth. var.; Calythrix lasiostachya Benth. nom. inval., pro syn.; Calythrix sapphirina Benth. orth. var.; Calytrix empetroides (Schauer) Benth.

= Calytrix sapphirina =

Species of flowering plant

Calytrix sapphirina is a species of flowering plant in the myrtle family Myrtaceae and is endemic to the south-west of Western Australia. It is a shrub with hairy branchlets, linear to elliptic leaves and deep pink, mauve or magenta flowers with about 30 to 45 stamens in several rows.

== Description ==
Calytrix sapphirina is a shrub that typically grows to a height of 1 m (3 ft 3 in) and has branchlets covered with soft hairs. Its leaves are linear to elliptic, 2.5–10 mm (0.098–0.394 in) long and 1–2 mm (0.039–0.079 in) wide on a petiole 0.3–1.2 mm (0.012–0.047 in) long, with stipules up to 1.5 mm (0.059 in) long at the base of the petiole. The flowers are usually tightly clustered on a peduncle 0.75–1.5 mm (0.030–0.059 in) long with spatula-shaped bracteoles 4.75–9.0 mm (0.187–0.354 in) long. The floral tube is spindle-shaped, 5–14 mm (0.20–0.55 in) long and has ten ribs. The sepals are mostly broadly elliptic, 1.0–2.25 mm (0.039–0.089 in) long, 1.25–2.5 mm (0.049–0.098 in) wide with an awn up to 14 mm (0.55 in) long. The petals are deep pink, mauve or magenta and there are 30 to 45 stamens with deep pink, dark purple or reddish-purple filaments in two or more rows. Flowering occurs in most months, but mainly from August to November.

== Taxonomy ==
Calytrix sapphirina was first formally described in 1839 by John Lindley in his A Sketch of the Vegetation of the Swan River Colony. The specific epithet (sapphirina) means 'like a sapphire or ruby'.

== Distribution and habitat ==
This species of Calytrix grows in heath on yellow sand or over laterite and in Banksia woodland from the lower Murchison River southwards to the Yanchep-Gingin district and east and south-eastward to the Southern Cross and Lake Grace districts, in the Avon Wheatbelt, Coolgardie, Esperance Plains, Geraldton Sandplains, Jarrah Forest, Mallee, Murchison and Swan Coastal Plain bioregions of south-western Western Australia.

== Conservation status ==
Calytrix sapphirina is listed as "not threatened" by the Government of Western Australia Department of Biodiversity, Conservation and Attractions.
