= Yanchep District High School =

Former school in Western Australia

Location
- Yanchep, Western Australia; Australia; 31°33′07″S 115°38′10″E

Information
- Type: Public co-educational primary and high day school
- Motto: Youth Determined to Succeed
- Opened: 1975; 51 years ago
- Closed: 2017; 9 years ago
- Educational authority: WA Department of Education
- Years: K–10
- Campus type: Suburban

Yanchep District High School was a public co-educational primary and high day school, located in the Perth suburb of Yanchep, Western Australia. It was opened in 1975 and closed in 2017, replaced by Yanchep Secondary College and Yanchep Lagoon Primary School.

== History ==
Yanchep District High School opened in 1975 for Kindergarten to Year 7 students, as Yanchep Primary School. The school expanded to Year 8s in 1980, Year 9s in 1981 and Year 10s in 1982, and was renamed to Yanchep District High School in 1981. Yanchep District High School served students living in Yanchep, Two Rocks, Quinns Rocks, Butler and Woodridge. The closest school for Year 11s and 12s from 2003 to 2012 was Mindarie Senior College, 16 km (9.9 mi) south, and from 2013 onwards, Butler College, 13 km (8.1 mi) south.

In the 2010s, Yanchep and Two Rocks experienced large growth. Yanchep has a population of 4,247 in 2011, which more than doubled to 8,868 in 2016. As a result, Yanchep District High School did not have the facilities required to serve the number of students it had. The state government decided to construct a new high school in Yanchep, and convert the existing Yanchep District High School to be a primary school. Yanchep District High School closed at the end of 2017. In February 2018, Yanchep Secondary College opened to Year 7 to 11 students, at a new location with new facilities, and Yanchep Lagoon Primary School opened to Kindergarten to Year 6 students at the site of Yanchep District High School. Since then, most of Yanchep Lagoon Primary School has been demolished and rebuilt with more modern facilities.

== Student numbers ==
Year	Number		
Year	Primary	Secondary	Total
2012	441	186	627
2013	523	250	773
2014	421	264	685
2015	277	351	628
2016	264	330	594

Student numbers do not include kindergarten. Prior to 2015, Year 7 was designated as primary school.

== See also ==
- List of schools in the Perth metropolitan area
- Yanchep Secondary College
