= Yanchep Secondary College =

School in Perth, Western Australia

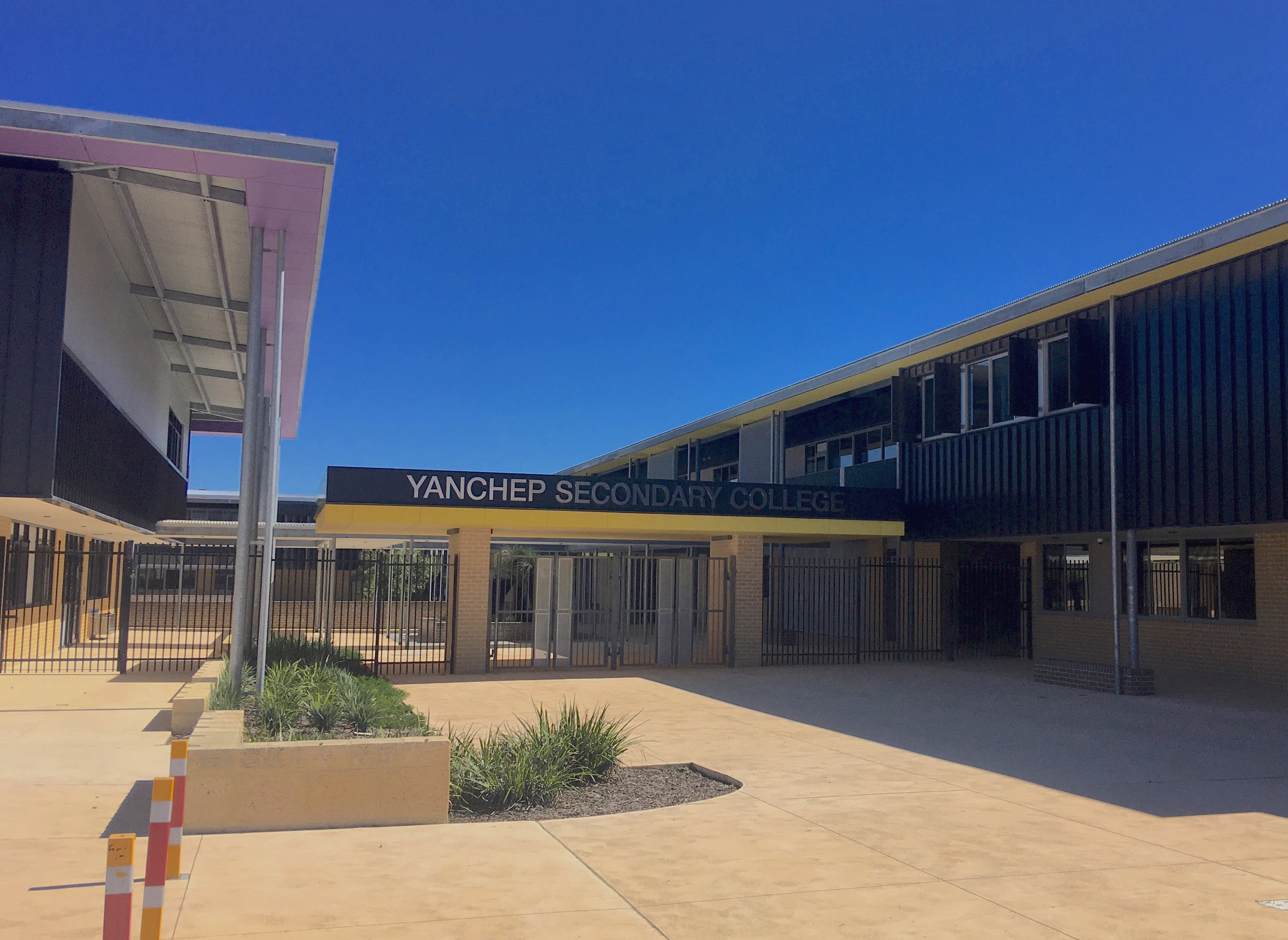
- Yanchep Secondary College main entrance in April 2021

Location
- 21 Ravensbourne Street; Yanchep, Western Australia; Australia
- Coordinates: 31°33′11″S 115°38′31″E

Information
- Type: Independent public co-educational day school
- Motto: Inspire. Achieve. Succeed
- Opened: 2018; 7 years ago
- Educational authority: WA Department of Education
- Principal: Anthony Johnson
- Years: 7–12
- Enrolment: 650 (2019)
- Campus type: Suburban
- Website: www.yanchepsc.wa.edu.au

Yanchep Secondary College is an Independent Public secondary school in Yanchep, a far northern suburb of Perth, Western Australia.

== History ==
Yanchep District High School was the school serving the Yanchep area, with students from Kindergarten to year 10. The closest school for year 11's and 12's was Butler College, 16-kilometre (9.9 mi) south. Due to the area being one of the fastest growing parts of Perth, there was a need for a larger high school.

Stage one of Yanchep Secondary College commenced construction in 2017; this stage is set to cater for 725 students, costing $43.5 million. Stage one has 33 general classrooms, specialist rooms for science, computing, woodwork, metalwork and home economics, a gymnasium and sports fields.

Yanchep Secondary College opened at the start of the 2018 school year for years 7 to 11, with year 12's beginning in 2019. Yanchep District High School was renamed to Yanchep Lagoon Primary School, and it stopped serving high school students.

Stage two began construction in 2019. It had a cost of $12.5 million. It caters for up to 1,500 students, and includes a performing arts centre, a commercial kitchen and cafe. It was completed in December 2020, on schedule.

== Local intake area ==
The school's local intake area covers the suburbs of Yanchep and Two Rocks. The local intake area for Year 11s and 12s also covers the localities/towns of Breton Bay, Caraban, Cowalla, Gabbadah, Guilderton, Karakin, Lancelin, Ledge Point, Nilgen, Neergabby, Seabird, Wanerie, Wilbinga and Woodridge. Students living in the local intake area have a guaranteed place at the school if they apply.

== Academic results ==
2019 was the first year where Year 12's graduated. Due to there being only eight students acquiring an ATAR, no statistics were published.

== Student Numbers ==
Year	Number
2018	576
2019	650

== See also ==
- List of schools in the Perth metropolitan area
