= Leioproctus macropunctatus =

Scientific classification
- Kingdom: Animalia
- Phylum: Arthropoda
- Clade: Pancrustacea
- Class: Insecta
- Order: Hymenoptera
- Family: Colletidae
- Genus: Leioproctus
- Species: L. macropunctatus

Binomial name
- Leioproctus macropunctatus Batley, 2025

Species of bee

Leioproctus macropunctatus, or Leioproctus (Euryglossidia) macropunctatus, is a species of bee in the family Colletidae and subfamily Colletinae. It is endemic to Australia. It was described by entomologist Michael Batley in 2025.

== Etymology ==
The specific epithet macropunctatus is an anatomical reference to the coarse sculpture of the clypeus.

== Description ==
The female body length is 6.4 mm. Integumental colouration is mainly black, the metasoma dark brown. The hair is white to dark brown.

== Distribution and habitat ==
The species occurs in south-west Western Australia. The type locality is Yanchep.

== Behaviour ==
The adults are flying mellivores. Flowering plants visited by the bees include Hakea species.
