= No. 227 Radar Station RAAF =

Coordinates: 31.5335°S 115.6906°E

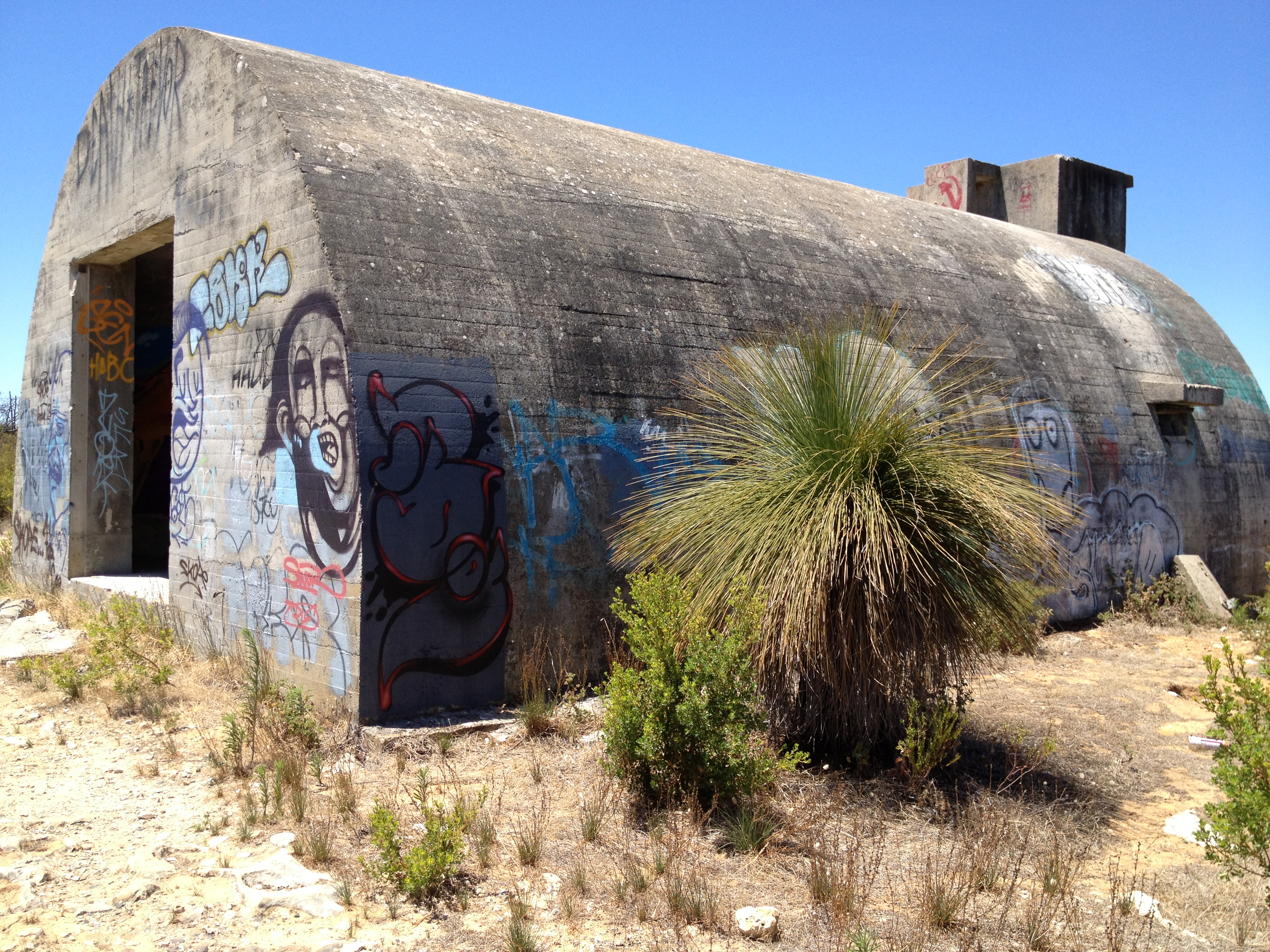
- External view of the bunker, January 2013
- Active: 1943–45
- Country: Australia
- Branch: Royal Australian Air Force
- Role: Early warning
- Garrison/HQ: Yanchep, Western Australia

Commanders
- Notable commanders

Western Australia Heritage Register
- Official name: YNP Army Bunkers - Radar Installation
- Type: State Registered Place
- Designated: 16 June 1992
- Reference no.: 2682

No. 227 Radar Station RAAF was a Royal Australian Air Force radar station located at Yanchep, Western Australia. Established during World War II to provide early warning of Japanese air raids against Perth, the radar station was formed in 1942–43 and operational by late 1943.

== History ==
In 1942, approval was granted for the establishment of radar equipment at Yanchep. The site became fully operational on 27 October 1943. No. 227 Radar Station was formed in August 1943 and was responsible for the operation of the radar, and reporting to the Western Australian Air Defence Headquarters. The unit was a combination of Royal Australian Air Force (RAAF) and Women's Auxiliary Australian Air Force (WAAAF) personnel.

Two concrete huts, 40 metres apart, housed the radar equipment. The southern hut contained the transmitter and the northern hut the receiver. The daily unit operational occurrence reports do not record any actual tracking of enemy aircraft although the unit had the distinction of being responsible for the first genuine air raid alarm for the city of Perth. This occurred during that Western Australian emergency of March 1944. Just after midday on 10 March 1944, radar operators observed multiple aircraft blips, some 150 miles (240 km) to the north of Perth. Authorities decided that they could not wait any longer for positive confirmation of enemy activity and a full scale air raid alarm was sounded throughout the city of Perth. No aircraft were spotted, and a later investigation suggested it had been the result of enemy jamming.

After Victory in the Pacific Day, 15 August 1945, personnel were progressively ordered out. Operations ceased in November 1945, and the unit was finally disbanded after two years and one months service. The station's former bunkers were turned to agricultural production by local mushroom growers in the 1960s and 70s, but eventually became disused. In 1987–88, they were classified in the Register of the National Estate and classified by the National Trust of Australia.
