= Aquarium of Western Australia =

The Aquarium of Western Australia (AQWA)

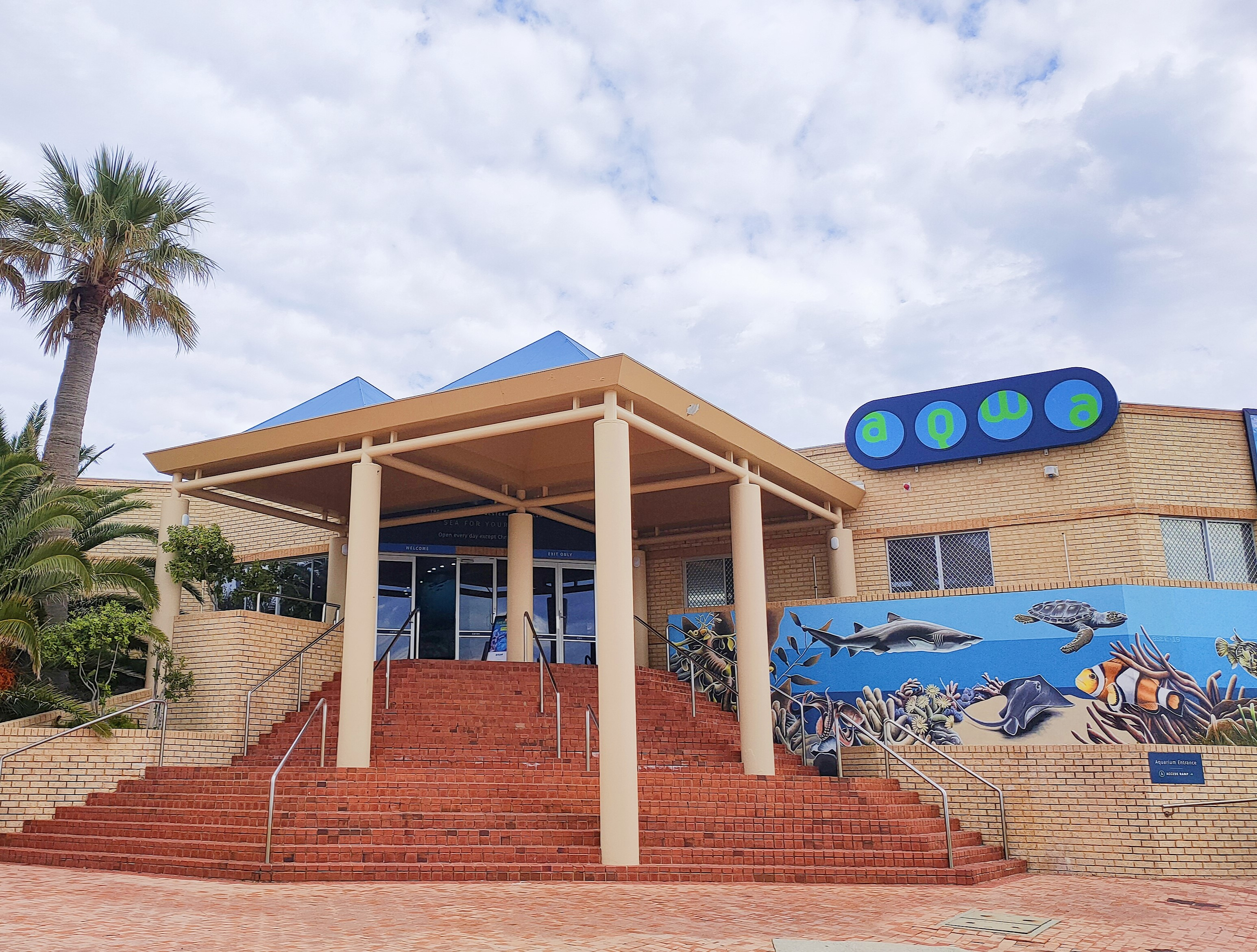
- Entrance to AQWA
- Interactive map of The Aquarium of Western Australia (AQWA)
- 31°49′36″S 115°44′17″E
- Date opened: 1988 (as Underwater World, Perth); 2001 (as AQWA)
- Location: Hillarys, Western Australia
- No. of species: 400
- Volume of largest tank: 3,000,000 litres (793,000 US gal)
- Website: www.aqwa.com.au

The Aquarium of Western Australia (AQWA) (Note: Pronounced /ˈækwə/ “aqua”) is a privately owned aquarium in Hillarys, Western Australia. Located approximately 20 km (12 mi) north-west of Perth at Hillarys Boat Harbour, it is a popular attraction for both tourists and locals, having attracted over 9.6 million visitors as of July 2026.

AQWA was Australia's largest aquarium when it opened and still possesses Australia's largest single aquarium and underwater tunnel, the 3 million-litre Shipwreck Coast exhibit. As of 2025, AQWA houses over 45 unique displays showcasing native Western Australian marine life and living corals, many of which are endemic to WA's waters.

== History ==
The aquarium opened on 13 April 1988 as Underwater World, Perth. It was acquired by the current owners, Coral World International and Morris Kahn, in 1991, and changed its name to AQWA - The Aquarium of Western Australia on 1 January 2001.

Underwater World opened with only a handful of aquariums, including the feature walk-through aquarium which has been listed as one of the largest aquariums in the world.

In 1992, following unsuccessful attempts by the defunct Atlantis Marine Park to rehabilitate three of its previously captive dolphins to the wild, a sea pen was constructed at Underwater World to provide the dolphins a new home. While at the aquarium, two calves were born to the dolphins but did not survive. After residing at the aquarium for several years, all three dolphins died suddenly in December 1999; an investigation later found that two of the dolphins had died from poisoning, however authorities were not able to determine the source of the poison. The sea pen was later removed, and a sculpture and wishing well dedicated to the dolphins was later built at nearby Hillarys Boat Harbour. The aquarium also formerly hosted seals in their own enclosure.

The aquarium experienced a decline in visitor numbers between 2012 and 2018, but saw record attendance since the COVID-19 pandemic.

In January 2026, the aquarium announced a $13 million expansion and redevelopment that will include a new large aquarium, new exhibits, a 125-seat cinema, and a new multi-purpose facility to house the aquarium's conservation and rehabilitation programs. The redevelopment is expected to be completed by 2027.

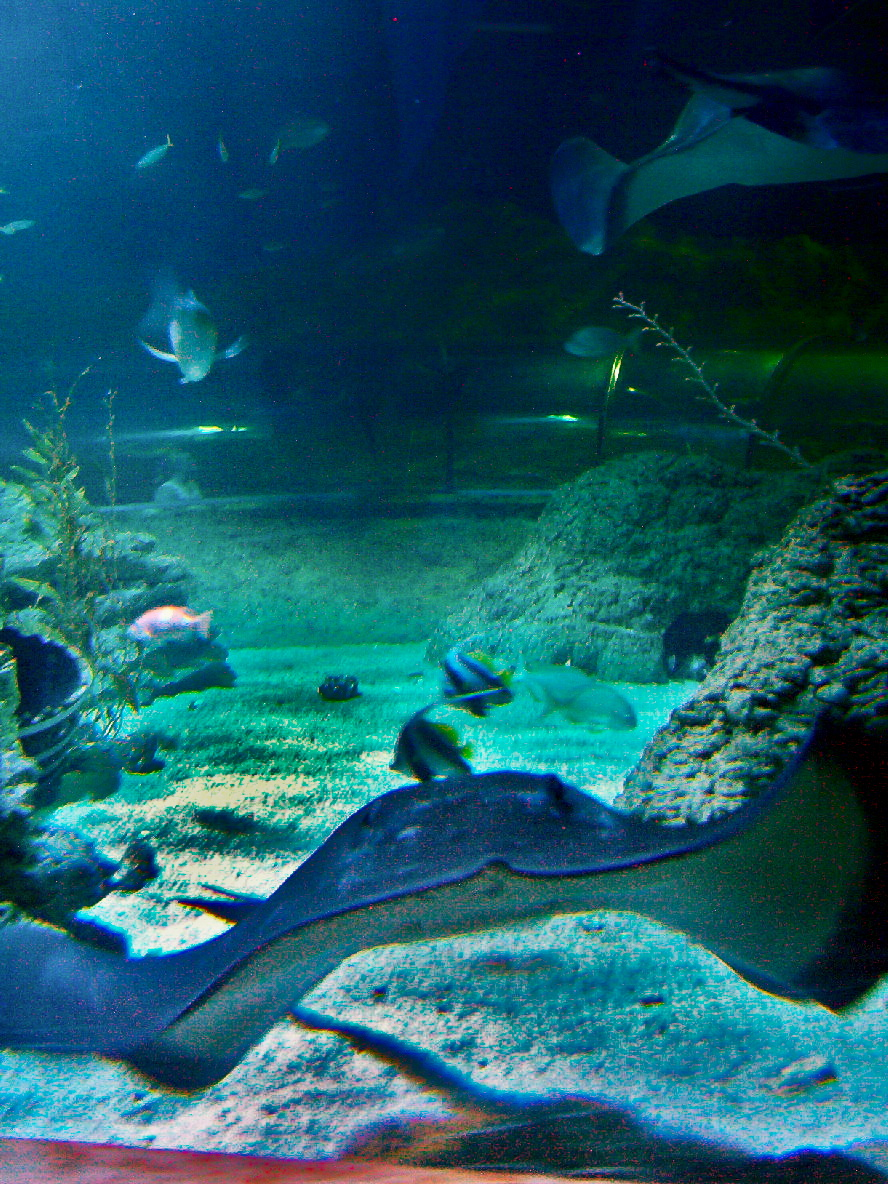
Stingray in the main tank

== Exhibits ==
The aquarium specializes in marine animals that inhabit the 12,000-kilometre (7,500 mi) long coastline of Western Australia. In total AQWA holds over 4,000,000 litres (1,057,000 US gal) of water and is home to approximately 400 species of marine life.

AQWA is themed as an underwater journey along WA's coastline and is broken up into distinct zones. These include: the Great Southern, the Shipwreck Coast, the Perth Coast and the Far North. Each zone represents the unique marine life and habitats found along WA's expansive and varied coast.

The main attraction of AQWA is the Shipwreck Coast aquarium. It is 40 metres (130 ft) long and 20 metres (66 ft) wide and holds 3,000,000 litres (793,000 US gal) of flowing seawater. It incorporates a 98-metre (322 ft) underwater acrylic tunnel, the largest in Australia, with a motorised conveyor belt walkway. This temperate exhibit features a limestone (non-coral) reef at its core and is home to 3–4-metre (10–13 ft) grey nurse shark, 4-metre (13 ft) smooth stingrays, large loggerhead turtle and over 70 other species of rays, octopuses, sharks and fish natively found in Western Australia.

Beyond the main "coastline journey", visitors can also explore a feature exhibit zone and an outdoor zone. These areas showcase some of AQWA's specialities including coral cultivation and conservation, large integrated reef systems, turtle rescue and rehabilitation, dangerous marine life education, and creatures frequently encountered in the rock pools, marine park and marina adjacent to AQWA.

Some of AQWA's exhibits include:

- DangerZone - a line-up of WA's most dangerous marine life including stonefish, blue ringed octopus, lion fish, mantis shrimps and puffer and porcupine fishes
- Coral Conservatory: - home to the Glowing Ocean aquariums, showcasing coral fluorescence, and the Coral Bank of Western Australia, an initiative to create a living catalogue of Western Australia's hard coral species.
- Interactive Touch Pool - featuring local reef sharks, starfish and other echinoderms.
- Turtle Rehabilitation Pool - featuring sick and injured rescue turtles under care for the purpose of rehabilitation and release.
- Coral Reef Underwater Gallery - AQWA's Coral Reef underwater gallery is one of the largest living coral reef exhibits in the world, featuring stunning living corals and reef fish from Rottnest Island.

Other featured animals include the rare leafy seadragons, weedy seadragon, moon jellyfish, clownfish, juvenile saltwater crocodiles, octopus, cuttlefish, rock lobsters, scorpionfish, eagle ray, sandbar shark, Port Jackson shark, rescued sea turtles and many more.

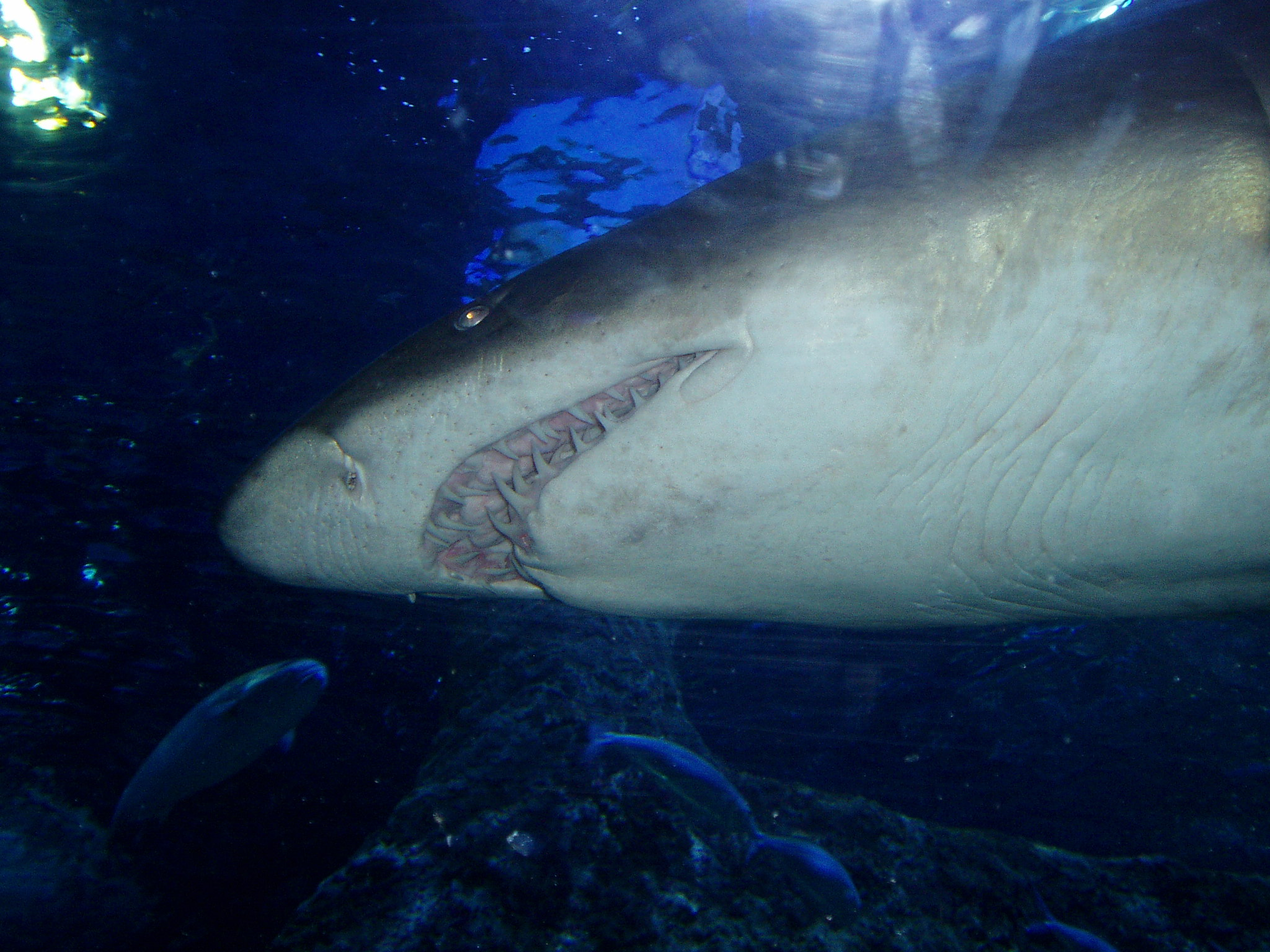
Grey nurse shark at the aquarium

== Experiences ==
For additional fees, visitors can book guided experiences that bring them closer to the animals and allow them to gain behind the scenes knowledge.

Snorkelers and qualified scuba divers can enter the water to encounter hundreds of fish, large sharks, stingrays and turtles by joining the aquarium's dive-master in the Dive or Snorkel with Sharks program. It is held in the main Shipwreck Coast aquarium. Visitors can also upgrade their entry to include a Behind the Scenes Pass or Glass-Bottom Boat Ride.

AQWA also hosts a dining experience, including a three course meal in the underwater tunnel surrounded by marine life. The Dine Beneath the Sea experience is held after-hours regularly throughout the year.

== The AQWA Foundation ==
The AQWA Foundation is a registered non-profit environmental organisation, established by AQWA in 2002. Its purpose is to increase awareness, understanding and appreciation of Western Australia's unique marine environment.

It is dedicated to supporting projects that promote better understanding of the marine environment, drive conservation action and foster positive relationships between people and the sea.

Past and current initiatives include:

- Rescue, Rehabilitation & Release programs, including the Turtle Rehabilitation Pool
- The Coral Bank of Western Australia
- Plastic and waste management programs
- 'Clean Marine' volunteer beach clean-ups
- Great white shark tagging and migration research, joint project with CSIRO

The AQWA Foundation is funded by AQWA, portion-of-sales fundraising, direct donations, sponsorships and grants.
