= Atlantis Marine Park =

Abandoned theme park in Western Australia

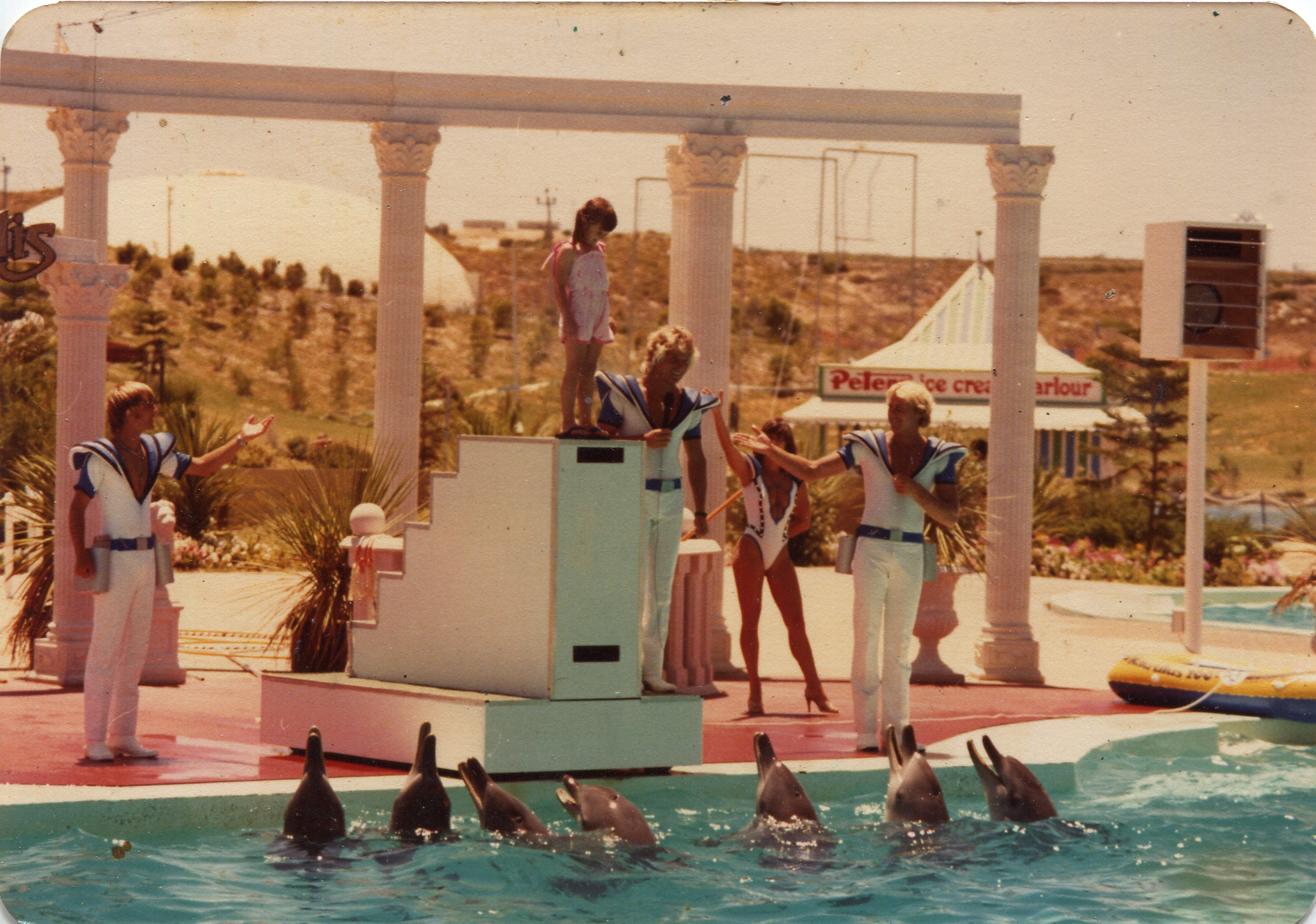
- Feeding the dolphins, c. 1985
- Interactive map of Atlantis Marine Park
- Location: Two Rocks, Western Australia, Australia
- Coordinates: 31°29′47″S 115°35′10″E
- Status: Defunct
- Opened: December 1981
- Closed: August 1990
- Owner: Tokyu Corporation
- Slogan: Atlantis marine park for the enrichment of mankind

Atlantis Marine Park was a former theme park that opened in December 1981 in Two Rocks, at the time a small fishing community, 60 kilometres (37 mi) north of Perth, the capital of Western Australia. The park was a major feature of businessman Alan Bond's Yanchep Sun City plan. It closed in August 1990 due to financial difficulties and a change in animal welfare regulations.

== History ==
In the 1970s, Bond purchased 8,100 hectares (20,000 acres) of land in Yanchep with a plan to build a large resort and residential area. The Japanese Tokyu Corporation later bought into the Yanchep Sun City project after Bond faced financial difficulties. The park was constructed in 1981 with the hope that Perth's rapid expansion would be accompanied by an equal growth in tourism.

Atlantis was opened on 26 December 1981 (Boxing Day), by the Premier of Western Australia, Ray O'Connor, and the chairman and president of the Tokyu Corporation, Noburu Gotoh. In his opening speech Gotoh explained that Atlantis was the first element in an expansion plan to make the Yanchep Sun City a premier leisure recreation region. Over 13,500 people visited the park over its first few days.

Although initially a success, as a result of declining visitor numbers, the park gradually losing money, as well as changes in regulations for holding marine mammals that meant the park would have to construct a larger dolphin enclosure, the owners decided to close Atlantis in August 1990.

== Attractions ==
Atlantis featured live marine animal shows, a water park with pools and water slides, a pedalo ride, a sea serpent-themed roller coaster and three restaurants. Along with its dolphin shows, the park also featured performing seals and sealions, a penguin exhibit, and an aquarium with turtles, rays and sharks on display. Live performances included those inspired by the Wild West, The Three Musketeers and Ancient Rome.

A 10-metre high limestone sculpture of King Neptune by American sculptor Mark Le Buse overlooked the park. Le Buse also contributed other sculptures, including a disembodied head of Jacques Cousteau. The park also featured a clock with the hours marked by limestone sculptures of celebrity heads, which included Prince Charles and Princess Diana, Charlie Chaplin, The Beatles, Elvis Presley and John Wayne.

=== Dolphins ===
Prior to the park's opening, seven bottlenose dolphins were caught from the local coastal population and were used as performance animals for the next ten years. In 1988, three female dolphin calves were born. At the time Atlantis closed in 1990, the park had nine dolphins, six wild born, and the three captive born juveniles.

With the closure of the park, owners Tokyu Corporation agreed to a proposal by Nick Gales, a marine park veterinarian and research scientist to fully fund the release of the animals to the wild, provided it would end their financial commitment to the dolphins. The project to release the animals into the wild began in March 1991; the rehabilitation program began in the park pools and eventually moved to a sea pen at the Two Rocks Marina in October 1991. The dolphins were fully released into the wild in January 1992.

The initial release encountered problems, with some of the dolphins losing a lot of weight. Three of them were recaptured and returned to the sea pen. The three recaptured dolphins were not re-released to the wild, but were relocated to Underwater World, now the Aquarium of Western Australia. The dolphins resided at a sea pen at the aquarium for several years before all three died suddenly in December 1999. An investigation later found that two of the dolphins had died from poisoning, although authorities were not able to determine the source of the poison.

== After closure ==
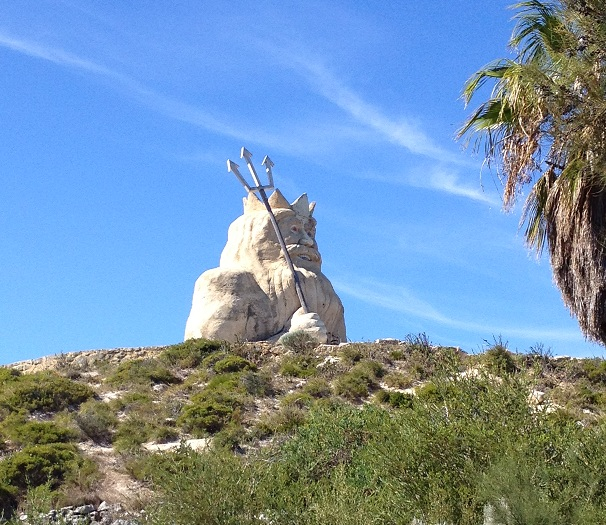
King Neptune in 2012

After its closure in 1990 the park was abandoned and vandalised, though the site was featured in the CBBC programme All Over the Place – Australia in March 2014.

The King Neptune statue remains a major landmark in the suburb and is often factored in any future redevelopment plans. The sculpture, which had sat abandoned and fenced off since the park's closure in 1990, was heritage listed by the Heritage Council of Western Australia in 2006, before being restored and the surrounding area reopened to the public in May 2015.

In January 2023, the Sun City precinct, which encompasses the former site of Atlantis Marine Park and the King Neptune sculpture, as well as Two Rocks Marina and shopping centre, was added to the State Register of Heritage Places in recognition of Sun City's place as the state's first private residential, commercial and recreational investment project.

As of 2026, much of the former site of the park has been cleared and slated for redevelopment. Most of the land is currently owned by property developers the Fini Group, which put forward plans to the City of Wanneroo to develop the area into a mix of retail, commercial and entertainment land uses. A portion of the site is also owned by the WA Royal Australian Air Force Association, which plans to construct a retirement community as well as a park surrounding the King Neptune statue that will be handed back to the City of Wanneroo after completion.

In late 2025, construction of a new shopping centre called Two Rocks Village on the site commenced, with the centre opening in June 2026; the development had faced widespread opposition from the community due to the heritage value of the site.
