= Mark Le Buse =

American sculptor

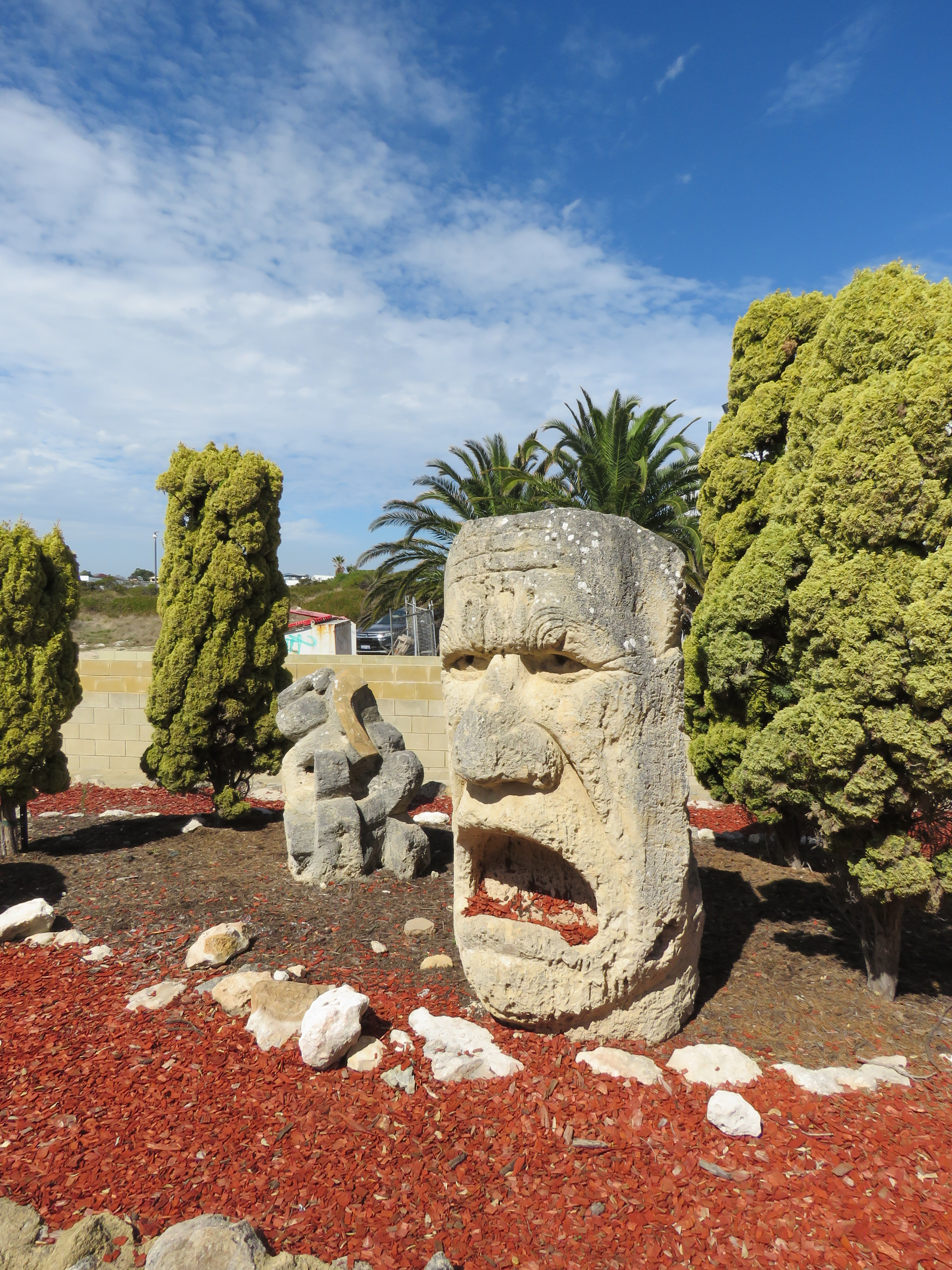
One of the Waugal Monoliths in Two Rocks, Western Australia

Mark Le Buse (born Allan Busey; September 7, 1917 - March 5, 1999) was a Hollywood prop maker, sculptor, and film actor.

After serving in the Navy as an electrician before World War II, and working as a shipfitter during it, Allan Busey found work in Hollywood, doing woodwork and prop construction for the major studios. He worked on several movies for Paramount, Including Shane, Elephant Walk, The Bridges at Toko-Ri, and 3 Ring Circus.

In 1954, he moved to Hawaii, to escape the Los Angeles smog. In addition to various odd jobs, such as driving a taxi, he began to carve sculptures in driftwood and black coral for the tourist market. After 1960, he sold out of a shop at the Kona Inn on the big island.

He was cast in small roles in 1964's Ride the Wild Surf, starring Fabian and Shelly Fabares, and multiple episodes of Hawaii Five-O in the late 1960s. In the mid-1960s, he changed his name to Mark Le Buse on the advice of a Shinto priest, who gave him and his second wife Jill new names determined by numerology.

In 1971, Le Buse and his wife left Hawaii, intending to emigrate to New Zealand. Instead, they spent three years in the Philippines, where Le Buse acted in several low-budget thrillers, before ending up in Western Australia.

His artistic work in Australia included a series of approximately 48 limestone outdoor sculptures, most notably large-scale works for the Atlantis Marine Park near Perth, such as a ten-meter high Neptune with trident (which was Heritage listed by the Western Australia Heritage Council in 2006) and “the disembodied head of Jacques Cousteau.”
