= Two Rocks =

- Suburb
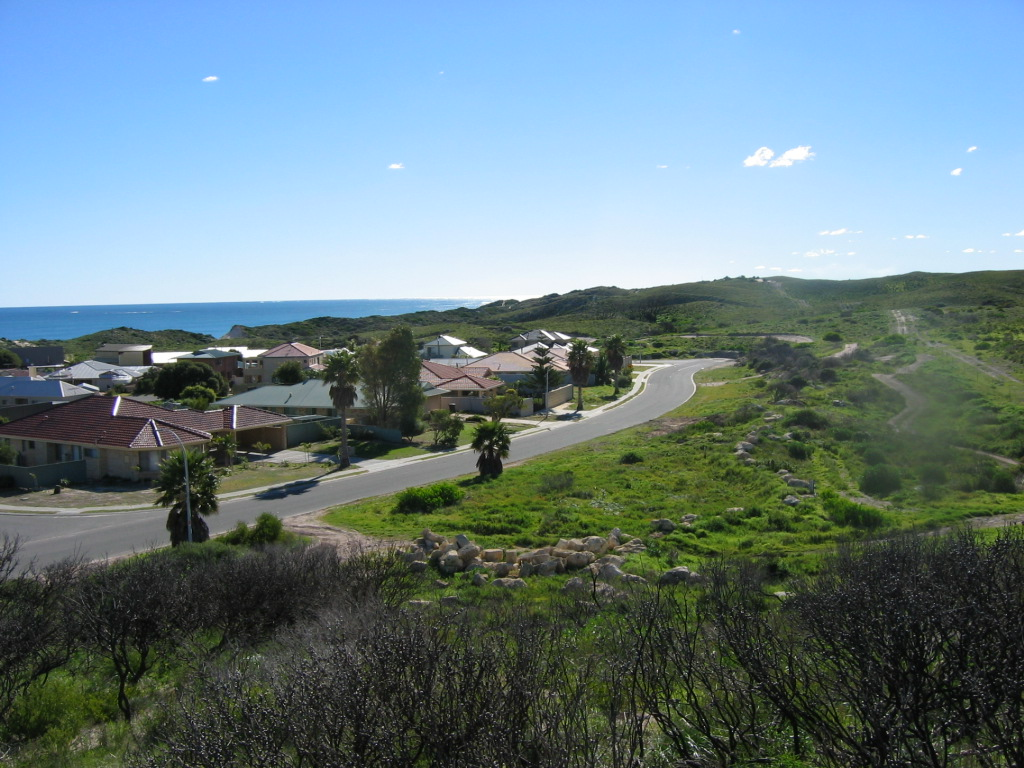
- View north from Two Rocks.
- Interactive map of Two Rocks
- Coordinates: 31.495°S 115.588°E
- Country: Australia
- State: Western Australia
- City: Perth
- LGA: City of Wanneroo
- Location: 61 km (38 mi) NNW of the Perth CBD
- Established: 1975

Government
  - State electorate: Butler
  - Federal division: Pearce

Area
  - Total: 52 km^{2} (20 sq mi)

Population
  - Total: 3,822 (SAL 2021)
- Postcode: 6037
Suburbs around Two Rocks
	Wilbinga
Indian Ocean	Two Rocks	Yanchep
	Yanchep	Yanchep

Two Rocks is a town in Western Australia, located 61 kilometres (38 mi) northwest of the Perth central business district. It is part of the City of Wanneroo local authority and represents the furthest northern extent of the Perth metropolitan region.

== Geography ==
While the suburb has a large area, at the 2001 census the suburb's entire population was recorded living within a 2.3 km^{2} (0.9 sq mi) region near the coast surrounding Two Rocks marina. However in more recent years residential development has spread to areas to the east and south-east of the established suburb. Large sections of the suburb are fenced off due to unexploded ordnance left behind from past military activity in the area.

A major landmark in the suburb is a large limestone sculpture of King Neptune by American sculptor Mark Le Buse, a remnant of the defunct Atlantis Marine Park, which operated between 1981 and 1990. The sculpture, which was abandoned and fenced off since the park's closure, was heritage listed by the Western Australian Heritage Council in 2006, before being restored and the surrounding area reopened to the public in May 2015.

In addition to the marina, the suburb also contains two small shopping centres, a public library, and two schools: the public Two Rocks Primary School, and the private Atlantis Beach Baptist College.

== History ==
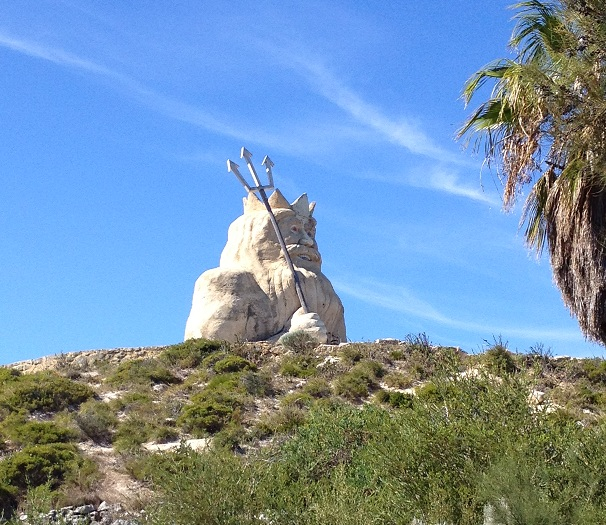
King Neptune sculpture in 2012

The suburb of Two Rocks takes its name from two prominent rocks offshore from Wreck Point. It was approved as a suburb name in 1975.

As well as being the former location of Atlantis Marine Park, the suburb was also a hub of Alan Bond's failed Yanchep Sun City development plan in the 1970s and 1980s. Sun City was the state's first private residential, commercial and recreational investment project. In recognition of this, the Sun City precinct, which encompasses the marina, the adjacent shopping centre, the King Neptune sculpture, and the former site of Atlantis Marine Park, was added to the State Register of Heritage Places in January 2023.

A large bushfire in the area in 1991 destroyed many dwellings in the suburb. Large parts of the suburb were also affected by a major bushfire in December 2019. The fire, which burnt over 14,000 ha over several days, came close to Two Rocks Primary School.

On 24 May 2023, an unnamed 15-year-old shot three times into a classroom at the Atlantis Beach Baptist College.

In late 2025, construction of Two Rocks Village, a new shopping centre on the former site of Atlantis Marine Park commenced, with the centre opening in June 2026; the development had faced widespread opposition from the community due to the heritage value of the site.

== Transport ==
=== Bus ===
- 498 Two Rocks to Yanchep Station – serves Gift Way, Breakwater Drive, Lisford Avenue, Sovereign Drive, Enterprise Avenue, Azzurra Loop, Two Rocks Road, Blaxland Avenue, Fawkner Road and Montibello Boulevard
