= Yanchep =

- Suburb
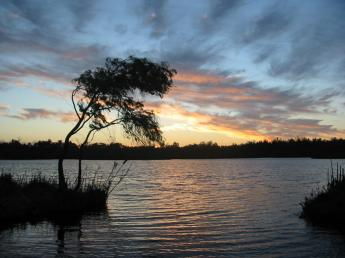
- Sunset over Loch McNess in Yanchep National Park
- Interactive map of Yanchep
- Coordinates: 31.55°S 115.634°E
- Country: Australia
- State: Western Australia
- LGA: City of Wanneroo
- Location: 56 km (35 mi) N of the Perth CBD
- Established: 1970

Government
  - State electorate: Butler
  - Federal division: Pearce

Area
  - Total: 221.4 km^{2} (85.5 sq mi)

Population
  - Total: 11,022 (SAL 2021)
- Postcode: 6035
Suburbs around Yanchep
	Two Rocks
Indian Ocean	Yanchep	Pinjar
	Eglinton	Carabooda

Yanchep is a coastal suburb north of Perth, Western Australia, 56 kilometres (35 mi) north of the Perth CBD. It is a part of the City of Wanneroo local government area. Originally a small crayfishing settlement, it was developed by entrepreneur Alan Bond in the 1970s and 80s for the 1987 America's Cup. The area covers the urban centre of Yanchep as well as Yanchep National Park in its entirety and a large area of the Gnangara-Moore River State Forest.

== Geography ==
Yanchep is bounded to the north-west by Two Rocks and to the south by the rural localities of Eglinton, Carabooda and Pinjar. The non-metropolitan Shires of Gingin and Chittering surround Yanchep's northern and eastern boundaries. West of Yanchep is the Indian Ocean.

For a suburb it is extremely large, covering over 220 square kilometres (85 sq mi) and taking up almost the entire northern and north-eastern portion of the City of Wanneroo. Despite this, Yanchep's urban concentration is almost entirely located in an enclave generally centred around the intersection of Marmion Avenue and Yanchep Beach Road, near the coast.

== History ==
For thousands of years prior to the arrival of Europeans, the Yanchep area was inhabited by the Indigenous Australian Noongar people, and was a noted hunting site. The name Yanchep was adapted from the Noongar word "Yandjip", or "Yanget", which is their name for the bulrush reed that is common in the wetlands of the area (compare Yangebup in the city's south). Following British settlement, the land now occupied by Yanchep was being used as a sheep station. In 1917, the Alex T. Brown was wrecked on the Yanchep coast, with timber salvaged for use in early Wanneroo buildings.

In 1970, Alan Bond bought approximately 8,100 hectares (20,000 acres) of land at Yanchep and Bond Corporation developed designs for "Yanchep Sun City" - a future satellite city of over 200,000 residents. The first houses in the area were built in 1972, and the marina at nearby Two Rocks was built as part of the same project two years later. However, sales of homes in the area had already slowed down by 1974. In 1977, the project was bought out by Tokyu Corporation after Bond Corporation began experiencing financial difficulties.

In the Western Australian State Government's "Directions 2031" urban expansion plan, Yanchep was once again highlighted as a future satellite city and major metropolitan centre.

The Smorgon family is developing the north coastal area Capricorn Beach as a planned development.

On 11 December 2019, a fire that started in Yanchep burnt over several days through about 14,000 ha across Two Rocks and into the Shire of Gingin. Approximately 6,000 homes were saved, with only one being lost. The original Yanchep petrol station, owned by local Yanchep residents, was destroyed in the fire. The business was built around a heritage-listed building that had been in continual operation since the 1920s.

== Demographics ==
The Australian Bureau of Statistics has identified Yanchep and Two Rocks as a significant urban area experiencing rapid growth.

As of the 2021 Australian census, Yanchep had a population of 11,022, up from the 2032 persons recorded at the 2001 census. The population is predicted to continue growing rapidly, hitting 20,702 in 2031. 57% were born in Australia, below the national average of 66.9%. Like many other northern suburbs of Perth, a significant British-born minority is present, with 17.5% listing England as their country of birth at the 2021 census.

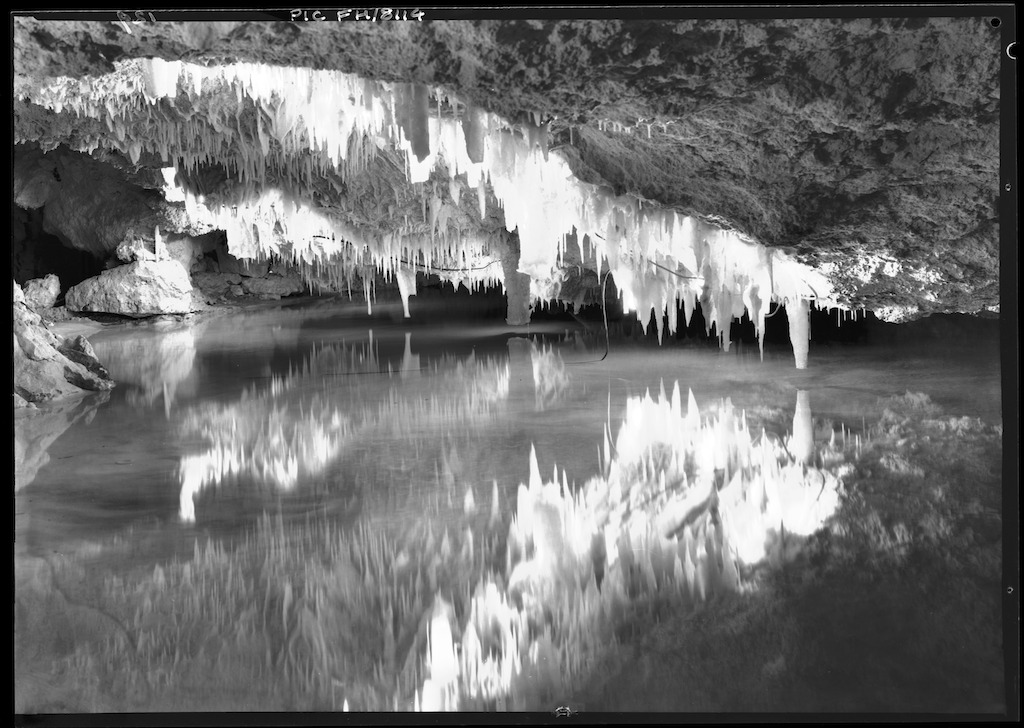
Yanchep, Crystal cave by Frank Hurley

The population share an average age of 35, close to the national average of 38. Income levels in Yanchep are near the Australian national average, with a median household income of $1,699 per week compared to $1,746 per week nationally.

In 2021, 53.2% of residents declared following no religion. This is in contrast to 2011, where 46.5% of Yanchep had residents declared a denomination of Christianity as their religious affiliation, with Anglicanism being the most populous at 24.5%. At the time 30.6% had declared no religion.

== Amenities and facilities ==
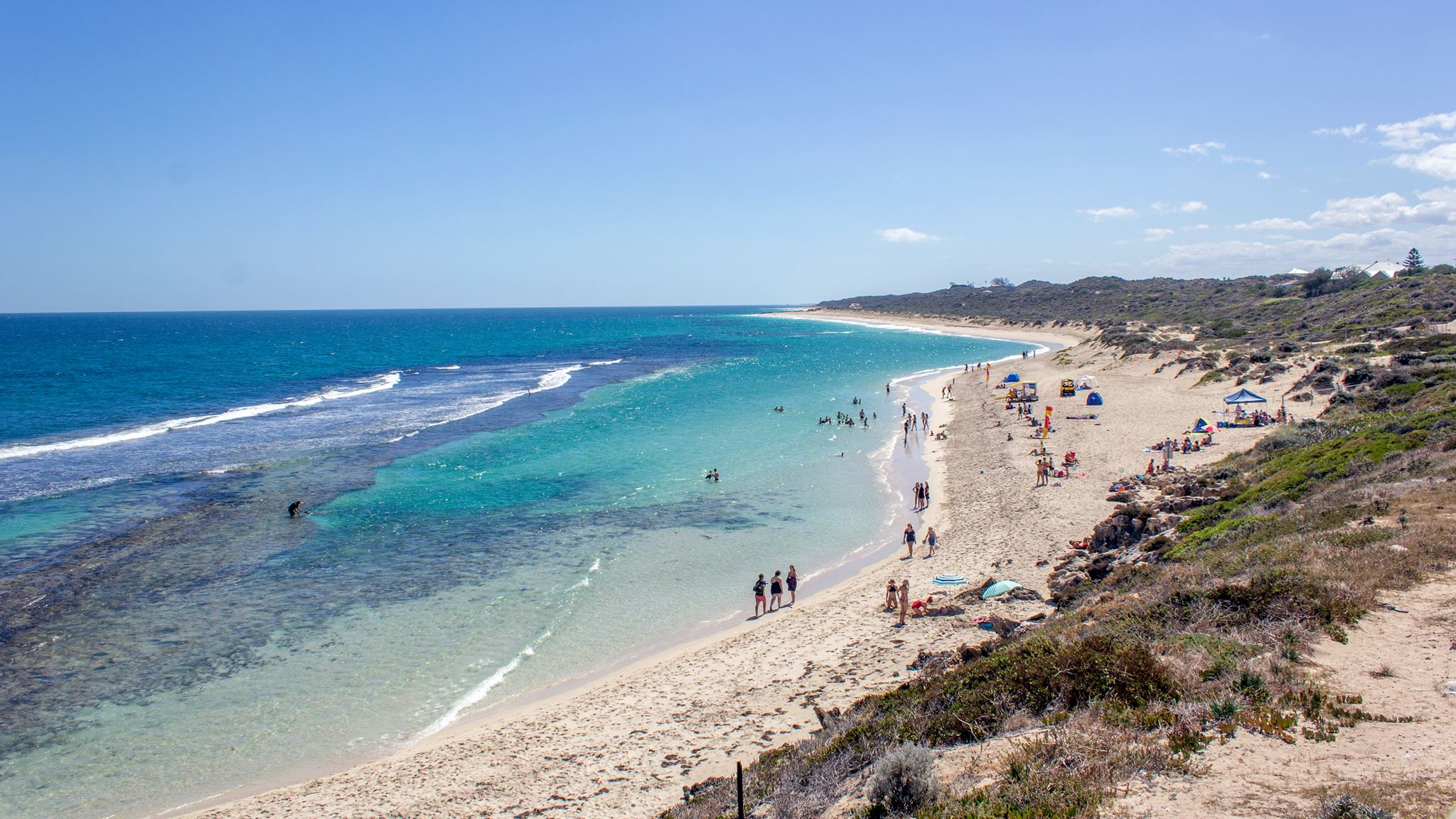
Yanchep Lagoon Beach

As a suburb, Yanchep has a shopping centre with a large Woolworths, various specialty shops such as a newsagency, butcher, bakery, hair salon, travel agency, cafe, massage and nail salons and fast food outlets. A garden centre, vet and various other businesses are also located in the industrial area a few hundred metres from the shopping centre.

Yanchep has several tourist sites located within the National Park, including the Yanchep lagoon, Big Yanchep Toe and the Yanchep Inn.

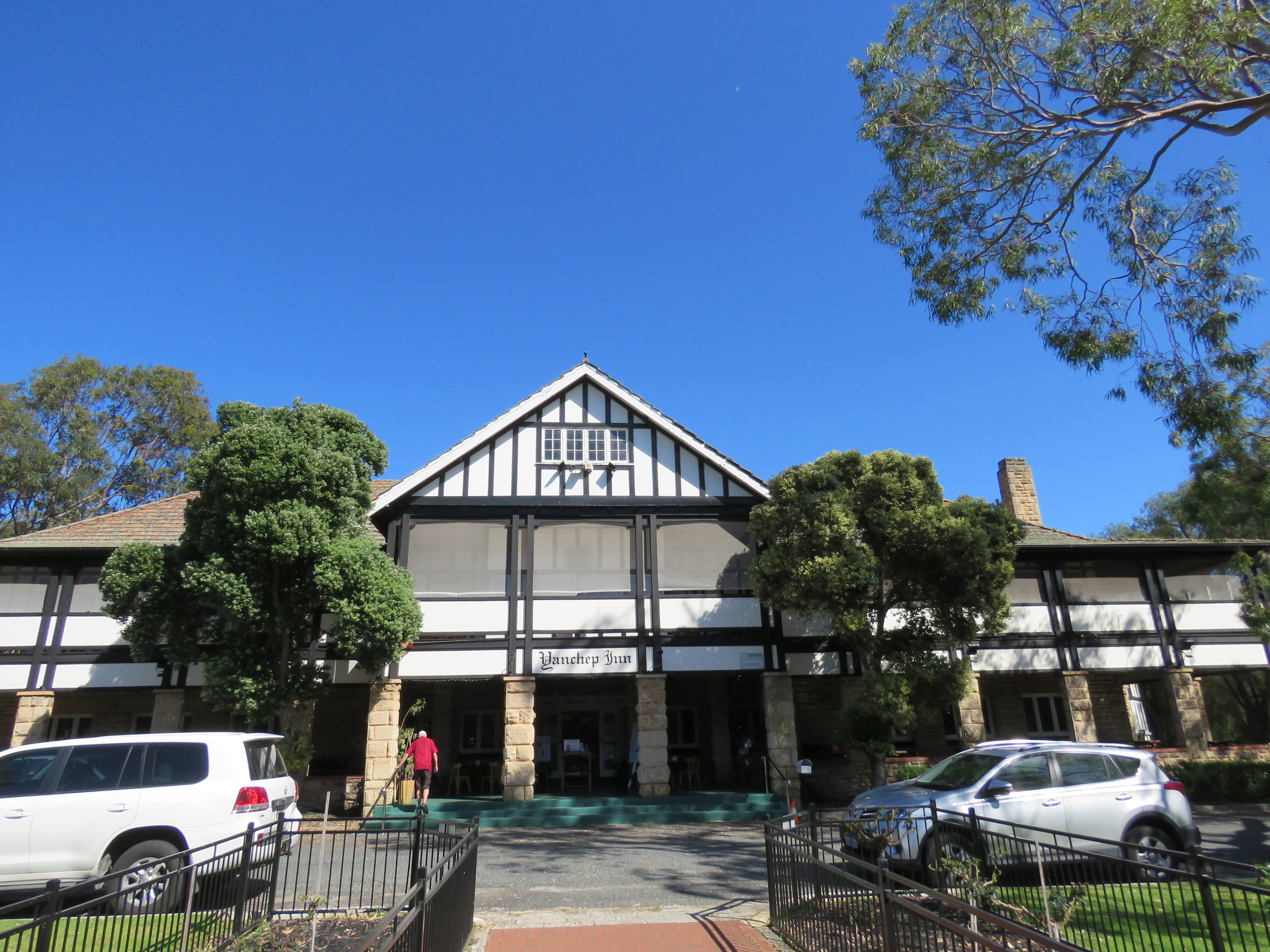
The state heritage listed Yanchep Inn at Yanchep National Park

. The National Park also includes the Crystal Cave, bush walks, koala displays, and the Loch McNess lake. During the 1980s, the area was home to tourist attractions including Atlantis Marine Park (in Two Rocks) and the Sun City Marina.

While there is no hospital at Yanchep, the area has a medical facility, and also has one large dedicated aged care facility.

== Education ==
There are currently four schools in Yanchep: Yanchep Beach Primary School, Yanchep Rise Primary School, Yanchep Lagoon Primary School and Yanchep Secondary College.

From 1975 to 2014, Yanchep District High School was the only school in Yanchep. It opened for Kindergarten to Year 7 students in 1975, later expanding to Year 10 in 1981. The school served Yanchep, Two Rocks, Carabooda and Woodridge.

In 2014, Yanchep Beach Primary School opened, catering for students from kindergarten to Year 6. It is an independent public school.

In 2018, Yanchep Secondary College opened for students from Year 7 to 11, expanding to Year 12 the following year, replacing Yanchep District High School as the local secondary school, and giving Year 11's and 12's living in Yanchep and Two Rocks the option of attending school nearby. Before Yanchep Secondary College opened, Year 11's and 12's had to travel to Mindarie Senior College or Butler College to access schooling. Yanchep District High School became a K-6 school and was renamed to Yanchep Lagoon Primary School.

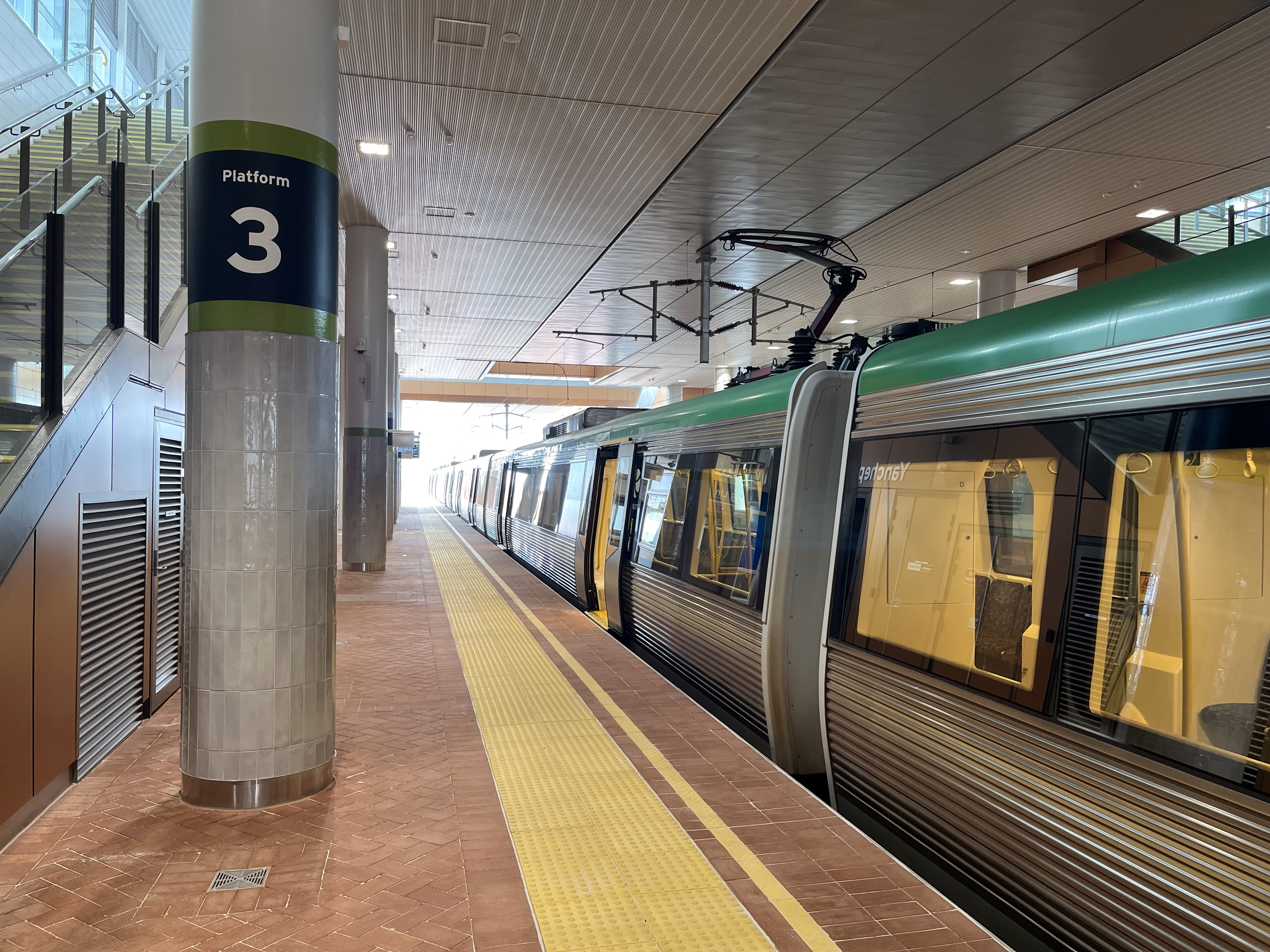
The newly-opened Yanchep Station on 18 July 2024

A third primary school, Yanchep Rise Primary School, opened in 2021.

== Transport ==
Yanchep Beach Road, one of the suburb's main distributor roads, links to Marmion Avenue and Wanneroo Road, two north-south arterial roads that link Yanchep to the rest of metropolitan Perth. Marmion Avenue was extended to Yanchep in 2008; Wanneroo Road was the only route to Yanchep from Perth prior to the extension.

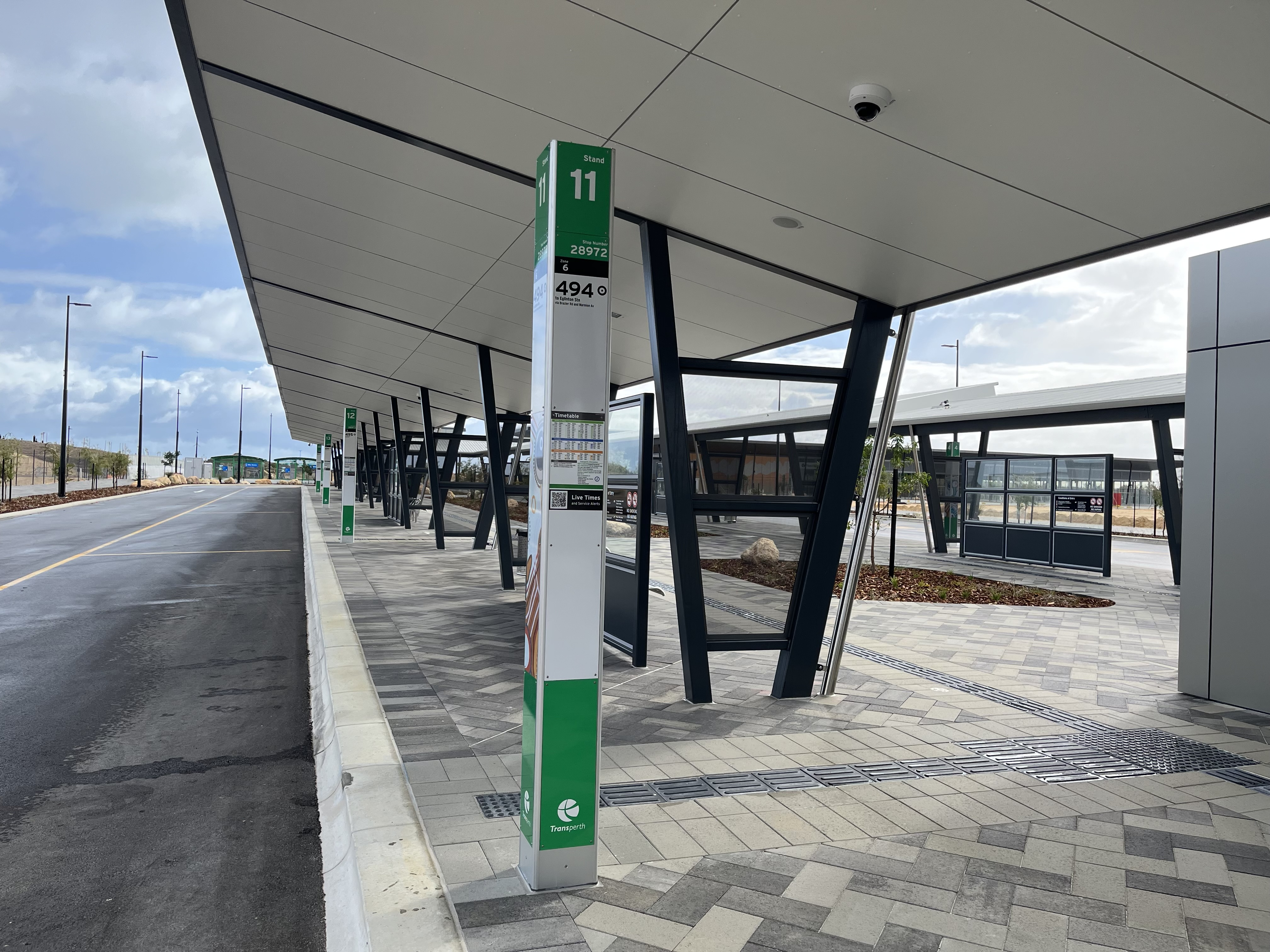
The outside waiting area at Yanchep Station

Yanchep railway station is the terminus of the Yanchep line, which was extended by 13.8 km (8.6 mi) from Butler railway station via Alkimos and Eglinton. In the 2017 WA state budget, $441 million was allocated to build the extension, with construction having started in late 2019. The extension and Yanchep railway station were opened on 14 July 2024; a journey time of 49 minutes is envisioned from the station to the CBD, with up to 13,500 people expected to use the line every day.

The station's bus network has four bus routes. Routes 494, 495 and 496 run south to Eglinton station via Yanchep Central Shopping Centre and the residential areas of Yanchep. Route 498 runs north to Two Rocks.

== Politics ==
Like many other northern Perth suburbs, Yanchep's population generally supports the Liberal Party at the federal level, but the Labor Party at the state level. There was considerable support for One Nation in that party's early days, and The Greens now have significant backing.

2022 federal election Source: AEC
Labor	42.67%
Liberal	22.76%
Greens	12.80%
One Nation	6.40%
United Australia Party	4.41%

2019 federal election Source: AEC
Liberal	46.51%
Labor	28.05%
Greens	9.35%
One Nation	7.53%
United Australia Party	2.14%

2010 federal election Source: AEC
Liberal	47.1%
Labor	32.4%
Greens	14.7%
CDP	2.2%
Family First	2%

2007 federal election Source: AEC
Liberal	50.7%
Labor	29.7%
Greens	9.4%
CDP	3.4%
One Nation	2%

2004 federal election Source: AEC
Liberal	51.6%
Labor	31.3%
Greens	7.5%
One Nation	4.6%
CDP	2.3%

2001 federal election Source: AEC
Liberal	38.5%
Labor	32.1%
One Nation	8.9%
Greens	8.1%
Democrats	4.7%

2008 state election Source: WAEC
Labor	42.7%
Liberal	35.6%
Greens	10.5%
Family First	2.8%
CDP	2.2%

2005 state election Source: WAEC
Labor	42.2%
Liberal	39.9%
Greens	4.3%
One Nation	2.5%
Family First	2%

2001 state election Source: WAEC
Labor	39.5%
Liberal	27.1%
One Nation	15.7%
Greens	5.7%
Independent	3.2%
