= SCEA =

SCEA or Scea may refer to:

- Scea, a genus of moths
- SCEA v. Hotz, a lawsuit involving Sony
- Single choice early action, a type of early admission process offered by some U.S. institutions
- Sony Computer Entertainment America, predecessor of what is now Sony Interactive Entertainment
- South Carolina Education Association
- Sun Certified Enterprise Architect, a professional certification
- Swan Christian Education Association, in Perth, Australia
- El Amarillo Airport (ICAO: SCEA), Chaitén, Los Lagos Region, Chile
