= AngliSchools =

Coordinates: 31°57′23.68″S 115°46′10.39″E

- Formation: 1985
- Headquarters: Perth, Western Australia
- Members: 16
- Official language: English
- Chair of the board: Lynne Thomson
- CEO: Peter Laurence
- Website: anglischools.edu.au

AngliSchools, formerly known as the Anglican Schools Commission (ASC), was established in 1985, following the passage of a resolution by the Perth Diocesan Synod of the Anglican Church of Australia. It was given the role of creating affordable Christian education in the Anglican tradition that is accessible to the disadvantaged and children with disabilities. There are over 2,500 staff and 17,500 students in AngliSchools schools as of 2024.

Since its establishment, AngliSchools has founded or acquired sixteen schools, initially in Western Australia, and has expanded into Victoria and New South Wales since 1998. AngliSchools does not directly control its member schools, but rather each school is governed by its own school council drawn from church, parent and community sources. Instead, AngliSchools lays down policies and procedures in a wide range of areas, most of which relate to education and management.

AngliSchools is headquartered in the Perth suburb of Mount Claremont on the campus of Wollaston Theological College. Peter Laurence is the CEO of AngliSchools, and is under the oversight of Kay Goldsworthy, Archbishop of Perth.

== Schools ==
AngliSchools has sixteen schools across three states as of the beginning of the 2025 school year. They are:

- All Saints Anglican School in Shepparton, VIC
- AngliSchools Language College in Perth, WA
- Cathedral College Wangaratta in Wangaratta, VIC
- Cobram Anglican Grammar School in Cobram, VIC
- Esperance Anglican Community School in Esperance, WA
- Frederick Irwin Anglican School in Mandurah, WA
- Georgiana Molloy Anglican School in Busselton, WA
- John Septimus Roe Anglican Community School in Mirrabooka, WA
- John Wollaston Anglican Community School in Kelmscott, WA
- Peter Carnley Anglican Community School in Wellard, WA
- Peter Moyes Anglican Community School in Mindarie, WA
- St George's Anglican Grammar School in Perth, WA
- St James' Anglican School in Alkimos, WA
- St Mark's Anglican Community School in Hillarys, WA
- Swan Valley Anglican Community School in Aveley, WA
- Trinity Anglican College in Albury, NSW
