= St Mark's Anglican Community School =

School in Perth, Western Australia

Location
- St. Mark's Drive, Hillarys, Perth, Western Australia; Australia; 31°47′58″S 115°44′36″E

Information
- Type: Independent co-educational primary and secondary day school
- Motto: Seek truth and wisdom
- Denomination: Anglicanism
- Patron saint: Saint Mark, the Evangelist
- Established: 1986; 40 years ago
- Educational authority: WA Department of Education
- Oversight: Anglican Schools Commission
- Principal: Steven Davies
- Staff: 200
- Years: K–12
- Enrolment: 1,800 (2023)
- Area: 11 hectares (27 acres)
- Campus type: Suburban
- Affiliation: Junior School Heads Association of Australia
- Website: www.stmarks.wa.edu.au

St Mark's Anglican Community School is an independent Anglican co-educational primary and secondary day school, located on an 11-hectare (27-acre) site on St. Mark's Drive, in the northern Perth, Western Australia suburb of Hillarys, Western Australia, on the former Red Cattle Ridge site.

The school was officially opened in 1986. The School employs over 200 staff, including teachers, education assistants, music tutors and administrative, grounds and maintenance staff.

== Overview ==
The primary and secondary schools are divided into four houses: Challen, Moyes, Watkins, and Carnley. Each House was named after a person who had been instrumental in the foundation of the School: Peter Carnley was Archbishop of Perth from 1981 to 2005, Michael Challen was an assistant bishop of Perth, Peter Moyes was headmaster of Christ Church Grammar School, and Glynn Watkins was an educator and administrator for over 40 years.

In 2025, the school set out on Stage 1 of their 10 year $30 million master plan, with the construction of a new student changerooms and maintenance facility. Stage 2 and 3 will see a new sports hall constructed and the refurbishment of an existing sports pavilion into new teaching spaces.

== Principals ==
There have been four principals at St Mark's: Barbara Godwin, Tony Stopher, Cameron Herbert and Steven Davies.

== Notable alumni ==
- Felicity Palmateer – professional surfer
- Jason Chatfield – cartoonist and comedian
- Oscar Allen – Brisbane Lions AFL footballer
- Josh Rotham – West Coast Eagles AFL footballer
- Calan Williams – racing driver
- Hayley Miller – Fremantle Dockers AFLW footballer
- Adam Lucas – Olympic swimmer
- Kim Mickle – Olympic javelin thrower
- Tamsin Cook – Olympic swimmer
- Natalie Alexander – Paralympic wheelchair player

== See also ==
Anglischools

- Anglican education in Australia
- List of schools in the Perth metropolitan area
