= Cathedral College =

Cathedral College may refer to various schools:

- Cathedral College Wangaratta, Australia
- Cathedral College of the Immaculate Conception, Queens, New York, United States
- Catholic Cathedral College, Christchurch, New Zealand
- St Mary's Cathedral College, Sydney, Australia
- The Cathedral College, Rockhampton, Australia
- Cathedral College, East Melbourne, Australia
