= John Septimus Roe Anglican Community School =

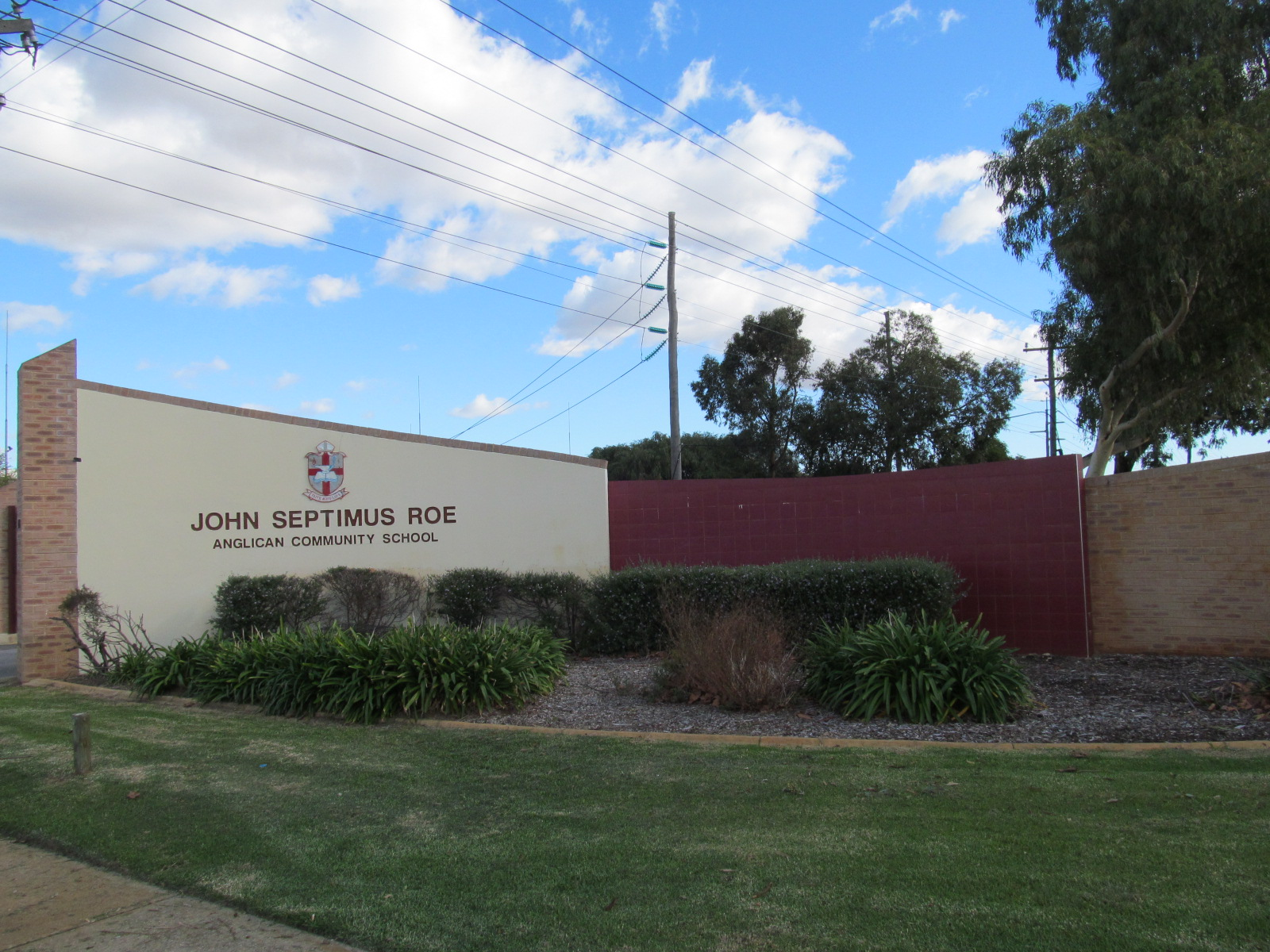
- John Septimus Roe Anglican Community School

Location
- 2 Boyare Avenue; Mirrabooka, Western Australia, 6061; Australia; 31°51′31″S 115°51′24″E

Information
- Type: Independent co-educational primary and secondary day school
- Motto: Faith, Hope, Love
- Denomination: Anglicanism
- Established: 1990; 36 years ago
- Oversight: AngliSchools
- Chair of School Council: David Hill
- Principal: Jason Bartell
- Staff: 248
- Teaching staff: 138
- Enrolment: 1,702 (c. 2025)
- Campus type: Suburban
- Houses: Durham, Kelmscott, Newbury, Parmelia, Roebourne and Sandleford
- Colours: Garnet and light blue
- Publication: The Tartan
- Yearbook: The Surveyor
- Website: www.jsracs.wa.edu.au

John Septimus Roe Anglican Community School (commonly abbreviated as JSRACS or JSR) is an independent Anglican co-educational primary and secondary day school located in Perth, Western Australia.

The school is named after the first Surveyor-General of Western Australia, John Septimus Roe. It is the largest school of AngliSchools.

== History ==
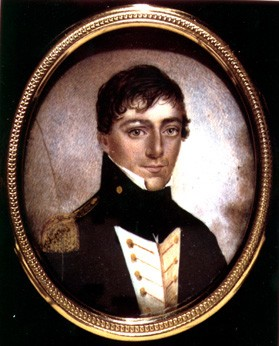
John Septimus Roe, first Surveyor-General of Western Australia

The school's first campus, originally named Thomas Scott Anglican Community School, was established in Beechboro in 1990 when it took over the old Northside Christian School at the request of the state government. The school's second campus, located in Mirrabooka, was opened in 1992 and exists as a combined primary and secondary school campus.

At first, while the school's two campuses shared the same administration and school council, they had separate cultural identities. There was a sports rivalry between the primary school students at the two campuses. In 1996, Thomas Scott Anglican Community School was renamed John Septimus Roe Anglican Community School to mark the new concept of "two campuses, one school".

Principal Matthew Hughes placed great emphasis on the modernisation of the school's facilities throughout his term. For example, the school completed the updated Ken Evans Science Building in 2005 and opened the Catherine O'Neill Library, named in honour of the Foundation Principal of the school, in 2007. In 2008, the renovation and modernisation of the ICT Centre was completed. A new Middle School Learning Community was completed in 2009, and a number of new classrooms—including a new Senior Learning Centre for Year 11 and 12 students—was finished in 2014.

In early 2012, an internal road system was finished. The school later renovated the Chapel of St Paul's, adding new facilities, a vestry, and an organ. In 2015, the redevelopment of the Mathematics and Year 10 facility, D Block, was finished, and the central cafeteria was reopened after renovations.

In February 2021, the school council announced plans to merge the two campuses, with Beechboro set to cease operations at the conclusion of the 2022 school year. The school has stated that it intends to partially redevelop the Mirrabooka Campus facilities by creating a new early learning space; a secondary school block; and expanded, modernised primary school facilities. The original Beechboro campus was closed as planned after the 2022 school year, with its students, staff and resources all being amalgamated into the Mirrabooka campus.

The previous Year 9 Learning Community was repurposed for Year 5 and Year 6 classes for the beginning of 2023. The new Michelle Bolt Early Learning Centre, catering for Pre-Kindy and Kindy students, was opened on 2 Semester 2023. The previous building for those levels was repurposed for Pre-Primary classes.

The beginning of the 2024 school year saw the completion of the double-storey Bromilow Learning Centre, the replacement for D-Block. Now referred to as B-Block, it is the new home for Year 9 and Year 10 students as well as for mathematics and languages classes. The adjoining amphitheatre, a new entrance to the Performing Arts Centre, and a revamped Chapel court were also completed as part of the project.

Both the Bromilow Learning Centre and the Michelle Bolt Early Learning Centre carry the names of facilities that once stood at the Beechboro Campus: The Michael Bromilow Centre (gymnasium) and the Michelle Bolt Library.

== Campus ==
The school is now located at one site in Mirrabooka. Throughout most of the school's history, the school was a dual-campus school. The now-closed campus at Beechboro served primary school students, while the newer, larger campus in Mirrabooka educates students from kindergarten to Year 12. Each location had a school chapel: Beechboro had St Bede's Chapel, and Mirrabooka had St Paul's. Both sites included canteens, libraries, oval spaces and gymnasiums.

=== Mirrabooka campus ===
The Mirrabooka campus was the primary campus during the school's dual-campus era and is now the school's sole campus. Campus buildings include:

- The Catherine O'Neill Library, including an ICT centre;
- The Matthew Hughes Performing Arts Centre;
- The Gymnasium;
- The Ken Evans Science Building;
- The Middle School Learning Community for Year 7 and 8, featuring classrooms, a common area, lounges, and a kitchenette;
- The Bromilow Learning Centre for Year 9 and 10, featuring classrooms, study spaces, and a kitchenette; and
- The Senior Learning Centre for Year 11 and 12, featuring classrooms, study spaces and kitchenettes.

=== Beechboro campus ===
The Beechboro campus formerly catered to students from pre-kindergarten to year 6. The campus was home to the Michael Bromilow Centre, which had a full-size basketball court, offices, change rooms, storage, and a kitchen. Permits for the construction of the Centre were first filed in 2007, with construction beginning soon after.

The original Beechboro campus was closed at the conclusion of the 2022 school year, and the site was vacated in Term 1 of 2023, with all students and staff relocating to Mirrabooka.

The land was rezoned for residential use in early 2023, and all facilities were demolished in the latter half of that year. Due to some public outcry, a few of the trees which were part of the campus were retained. The retained trees included a patch of marri trees, which were located behind the former gymnasium.

== Curriculum ==
The primary school curriculum follows that imposed by the state government, focusing on numeracy and literacy.

Students in Years 7-10 must study mathematics, English, science, humanities and social sciences, health education, physical education and religious education. During Years 7 and 8, students must study Trailblazer and either Indonesian or Mandarin Chinese for one period a-week. Each student also chooses four different electives, which they study twice-a-week for one semester. These elective subjects are:

- One of dance, drama or music;
- One of visual arts or media arts;
- One of design and technology (woodwork) or food technology (cooking); and
- digital technologies.

In Year 9, students pick any two elective subjects that they study twice-a-week for the whole year, alongside an adulthood program called The Rite Journey. The available electives include those listed above, as well as outdoor education, Mandarin Chinese, Indonesian, and the school's basketball program.

Study in the senior secondary years is reflective of the guidelines set down by the School Curriculum and Standards Authority (SCSA). Year 10 students can choose three elective subjects to study twice-a-week for the whole year, with most students carrying over their subjects from the previous year.

In Years 11 and 12, students take six courses, with four 55-minute periods for each course per week. JSR offers multiple different pathways of study, which are:

- ATAR: The Australian Tertiary Admission Rank (ATAR) pathway is for students who are aiming to enrol in university via the Direct ATAR University Entry Pathway. At the end of their studies, students are given a rank derived from combining their school-based mark and their external Western Australian Certificate of Education (WACE) exam mark for their top ATAR subjects.
- Flexible: The Flexible Pathway provides a clear pathway to university, technical and further education (TAFE), or an apprenticeship or traineeship. The Flexible Pathway allows students to enrol in a selection of ATAR, general and certificate courses, or the school-based traineeship in hospitality.
- CareerLink: The CareerLink program affords students the opportunity to complete a VET Certificate course in conjunction with a Workplace Learning Endorsed Program. Endorsed programs provide students with learning areas that are not covered in either the ATAR or General Courses. Students enrolled in a CareerLink Pathway will achieve credit for both a Certificate II (minimum) and an Endorsed Program towards their WACE.
- Hospitality: The Hospitality School-Based Traineeship is a hospitality program delivered on site. The training is delivered by both JSR teachers and an industry-trained onsite chef in conjunction with a Registered Training Organisation. Students staff the canteen and cafe during school hours, as well as catering for in-school and out-of-school special events. Hospitality students are paid for the work in this program, as well as receiving credit for Certificate II (Yr11) and Certificate III (Yr12), as well as qualifications for numerous fields in the hospitality industry.
- Trade Prep: The Trade Preparation pathway is a CareerLink Pathway designed to prepare students for a trade or employment in a related occupation. This pathway includes specialised trade-specific English and Maths courses.

All year groups undertake compulsory religious education until Year 12. During Years 11 and 12, students can choose to study Religion and Life as an ATAR course or a general course, allowing them to have a study period whilst their year group has their 1 period a week of Anglican Religious Studies Endorsed Program.

== Co-curricular activities ==
There are multiple clubs that encompass academics, sports and technology. Some of these include the 100 Club (Primary) and 300 Club (Secondary), Swimming Club for Years 4-12 in Terms 1 and 4, revision sessions and homework help in multiple subjects, Media Club, Dance Club, Chess Club, Multicultural Club and AV Club. The school also takes part in multiple academic competitions including the Tournament of Minds for select Year 7-10 students, the Australasian Problem Solving Mathematical Olympiads (APSMO) for select Year 5–8 students and the Australian Mathematics Competition for select Year 3–12 students. The school has an extensive basketball program for secondary school students. The program runs during the school day, and acts as a class for students in the program. Many students, from JSR and other schools, try out for selection into the program.

Students are eligible to participate in interschool sporting teams across the year, where students face students from other Associated & Catholic Colleges of Western Australia (ACC) schools in the NEAS division. These schools include: Holy Cross College, La Salle College, Swan Christian College and Swan Valley Anglican Community School. Prior to 2026, JSR competed in the NWAS division. The schools compete in multiple sports including:

Term 1: Girls and Boys Basketball (7, 8-9, 10-12), Mixed Ultimate Frisbee (7-9, 10-12) and Cricket (7-12)

Term 2: Girls Netball (7–8, 9–10, 10-12) and Soccer (7–8 Boys, 7-9 Girls, 9–10 Boys, 10-12 Boys, 10-12 Girls)

Term 3: Volleyball (7-8 Boys, 7-8 Girls, 9-10 Mixed, 11-12 Mixed)

Term 4: Girls and Boys Indoor Cricket (7-9)

Furthermore, students who excel in inter-house swimming, cross-country, and athletics carnivals are selected into the JSRACS team for that sport and represent the school in ACC Inter-school Carnivals. As of the 2026 school year, JSRACS are in D Division for swimming and B Division for athletics.

The JSR Cadets program has been running for over 25 years, and it currently offers three different programs. The River Rangers Cadets, for Years 5–6, aim to empower children to protect local waterways. The Bush Ranger Cadets, for Years 7–12, allow students to work safely in and around nature. Finally, the Emergency Services Cadets, for Years 7–12, teach students the use of fire-fighting equipment and have them participate in drills.

- Bands
  - Concert Band (Years 7–12)
  - JSR Big Band (Years 6–12)
  - Junior Band (Years 6–7)
- Choirs
  - Primary Choir (Years 4–6)
  - Secondary Choir (Years 7–12)
  - St Paul’s Chapel Choir (Years 4–12)
- Ensembles
  - Secondary Guitar Ensemble (Year 7)
  - Cello Ensemble (Years 7–12)
  - Contemporary Ensemble (Years 7–12)
  - Percussion Ensemble (Years 7-12)
- Orchestras
  - JSR Jazz Orchestra (Years 9–12)
  - Chamber Orchestra (Years 7–12)
  - Sinfonia (Years 7–12)
  - Sinfonietta (Years 4–6)

Since 2008, music ensembles have begun touring, with the Senior Concert Band to New Zealand in 2008, the Secondary Choir to Germany and Austria in 2009, the Wind Band and Septissimo Strings to Singapore in 2010, and the Chapel Choir to the United Kingdom in 2011. 2012 saw the Jazz Band visit Mount Gambier, South Australia, to compete in the Generations in Jazz festival.

In 2000, the school entered the Rock Eisteddfod Challenge, for dance and drama, for the first time. The school won first place in the Perth Grand Final the following year. Many students are involved in all aspects of the preparation, dancing, and backstage tasks involved in a performance. The school only participated every second year until 2007.

The Drama and Dance department puts on a number of shows over the year, including:

- Choreography Night;
- Primary School Musical;
- Middle School Play; and
- Senior School Musical (previous shows listed below).
  - 2000 – Lockie Leonard: Human Torpedo
  - 2000 – Away
  - 2001 – Wolfstock
  - 2002 – Two Weeks with the Queen
  - 2002 – Hating Alison Ashley
  - 2003 – Looking for Alibrandi
  - 2003 – Boss of the Pool
  - 2004 – Così
  - 2004 – The Hunchback of Nostradamus
  - 2005 – Gumshoe
  - 2005 – Picnic at Hanging Rock
  - 2006 – The Man of Steel
  - 2007 – Oliver!
  - 2008 – The Servant of Two Masters
  - 2008 – The Sound of Music
  - 2009 – Pride and Prejudice
  - 2009 – How to Succeed in Business Without Really Trying
  - 2010 – Sweeney Todd: The Demon Barber of Fleet Street
  - 2011 – A Midsummer Night's Dream
  - 2011 – The Pajama Game
  - 2012 – The Mikado
  - 2012 – Stories from Suburban Road
  - 2013 – The Comedy of Errors
  - 2013 – Bugsy Malone
  - 2014 – Joseph and the Amazing Technicolour Dreamcoat
  - 2015 – Guys and Dolls
  - 2016 – Grease
  - 2017 – The Wedding Singer
  - 2018 – Grimm's Tales
  - 2019 – Legally Blonde
  - 2020 – A Midsummer Night's Dream
  - 2021 – We Will Rock You
  - 2022 – Bye Bye Birdie
  - 2023 – Charlie and the Chocolate Factory
  - 2024 – Fame
  - 2025 – The Addams Family
  - 2026 – 9 to 5: The Musical

The productions involve over 50 students in acting, orchestra, or backstage crew. Senior School musicals run for four nights with full houses, whilst the Primary School Musical and the Middle School Play run for three nights. Choreography Night also runs for three nights, with one night featuring a teachers' dance and the final night featuring an awards presentation.

== Notable alumni ==
=== Sport ===
- Joel Corey — AFL, Geelong Football Club
- Liam O'Connor — cricket, Adelaide Strikers, Western Warriors
- Dana Hooker — AFLW, Fremantle Football Club, West Coast Eagles
- Courtney Guard — AFLW, Fremantle Football Club, West Coast Eagles
- Charlie Thomas — AFLW, West Coast Eagles
- Ajak Riak — Football, Adelaide United
- Tyler Bader — Football, Tranmere Rovers Under 21s
