= Peter Moyes Anglican Community School =

Location
- Mindarie, Western Australia, Western Australia; Australia; 31°40′34″S 115°42′28″E

Information
- Type: Independent co-educational early learning, primary, and secondary day school
- Motto: Act Justly, Honour God
- Denomination: Anglicanism
- Established: 2000; 26 years ago
- Founder: Peter Moyes
- Oversight: Anglican Schools Commission
- Principal: Ben Lomas
- Chaplain: Dave Deeny
- Campus type: Suburban
- Colours: French navy, emerald green & gold
- Website: www.petermoyes.wa.edu.au

Peter Moyes Anglican Community School is an independent Anglican co-educational early learning, primary, and secondary day school, located in Mindarie, an outer northern suburb of Perth, Western Australia. The school was established in 2000 and caters for early learning and K–12 education. The school is named in honour of Peter Moyes, the first director of the Anglican Schools Commission.

== History ==
In 1997, the Anglican Schools Commission was in need of a campus in the Mindarie region. Construction of the school began in 2000, incorporating solely a primary school building. The school opened shortly after, with the construction of the Middle School and Science buildings completed one year later. In the years following, many features were added to the school such as the Creative Arts building and the auditorium (named the "Allan Shaw Centre" after the school's first principal, Allan Shaw). The construction of the senior school building finished in 2012. In 2016, a gymnasium and a new administration building were added to the school.

== School crest ==
The school crest has many symbolic meanings. The bishop mitre placed at the top of the crest signifies the connection between the School and the Anglican Church.

The left panel of the shield depicts white outlined waves in a green background. The waves represent the location of the school being near the ocean. The green represents one of the school's primary colours and its location in Mindarie. One of the many meanings for Mindarie is "place of green water".

The right panel depicts the stems of grass trees which gives a linked connection to the family name of Peter Moyes. Moyes is an old French name for Moses, who as a baby was set adrift on the Nile River in a small craft of bulrushes to save him from slaughter by the Pharaoh's Egyptian guards. It also symbolises another meaning of Mindarie: "dry leaves from a grasstree".

The book represents learning, and the Greek letters alpha and omega symbolise "the beginning and the end", meaning learning continues all through life.

== House system ==
The school has six houses:

- Lingiari House – named after Vincent Lingiari
- Hollows House – named after Fred Hollows
- Durack House – named after Mary Durack
- Cuthbert House – named after Betty Cuthbert
- Florey House – named after Howard Florey
- Cowan House - named after Edith Cowan

Every year the houses compete in a variety of activities, most commonly inter-house sporting carnivals. These include a swimming carnival, a cross country carnival and an athletics carnival. Participation in inter-school sports carnivals is optional, competing against other schools in sports such as netball, basketball, soccer and athletics.
