= Swan Christian College =

Location
- Middle Swan, Western Australia; Australia; 31°51′29″S 116°00′42″E

Information
- Former names: Swan Christian High School; Midland Christian School
- Type: Christian primary and secondary school
- Motto: Wisdom is of God
- Denomination: [Christian]
- Established: 1983
- Principal: Dr Darnelle Pretorius
- Staff: 219
- Years: Kindergarten to Year 12
- Gender: Co-educational
- Enrolment: ~1,500
- Affiliations: Swan Christian Education Association; Association of Independent Schools of Western Australia
- Website: www.swan.wa.edu.au

Swan Christian College is a non-denominational, co-educational Christian primary and secondary school located in the Swan Valley of Western Australia. The college has over 1,500 students from Kindergarten to Year 12. Swan Christian College is part of the Swan Christian Education Association (SCEA), and a member of the Association of Independent Schools of Western Australia (AISWA).

== History ==
Swan Christian College was founded in 1983 (under the name of Swan Christian High School) and first commenced operations on a vacated Seventh Day Adventist high school campus in Victoria Park before moving to its newly constructed Middle Swan campus in 1986.

In 1995, Midland Christian School moved from Midland to the Middle Swan campus, and in 1997 the school officially changed its name to Swan Christian College to become a K-12 school with the Junior, Middle and Senior School campus that is in place today.

== Governance and structure ==
Swan Christian College is one of seven schools that are part of the Swan Christian Education Association (SCEA). The college's K-12 campus in the Swan Valley, WA includes an online school and Trade Training Centre. Swan Christian College is registered on the Commonwealth Register of Institutions and Courses for Overseas Students (CRICOS) as an Australian education provider that recruits, enrols and teaches overseas students (CRICOS provider code: 00459J).

== Western Australian academic ranking ==
The following table summarizes Swan Christian College's Median Australian Tertiary Admission Rank (ATAR) ranking in recent years:

Year	No. of ATAR Students (4 or more ATAR subjects)	Median ATAR	% students achieving above 90 ATAR
2025	43	76.65	21%
2024	54	75.7	26%
2023	63	75.9	25%
2021		78.85	

The following table summarizes Swan Christian College's WACE achievements in recent years:

Year 12 student achievement data
Year	No. of F/T eligible Year 12 students	% students achieving WACE (Note: Percentage of Year 12 cohort that graduated with a WACE certificate)
2025	145	99.00
2024	169	99.00
2023	163	100.00
2021	156	100.00
2018	179	98.32
2017	172	96.50
2016	179	94.40
2015	179	100.00
