= St George's Anglican Grammar School =

School in Perth, Western Australia

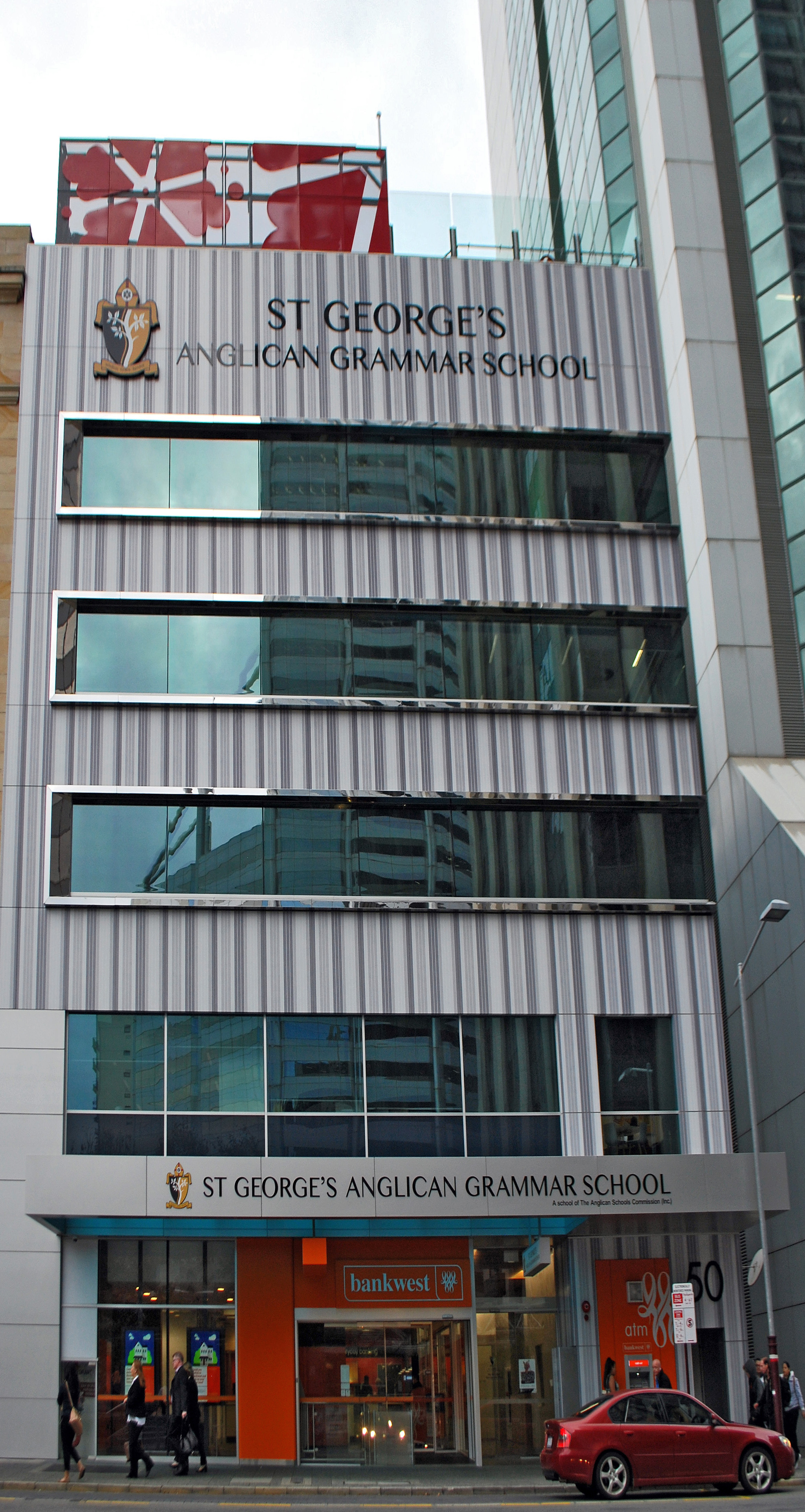

Location
- 50 William Street & 441 Murray Street, Perth central business district, Western Australia; Australia; 31°57′15″S 115°51′25″E

Information
- Type: Independent co-educational secondary day school
- Motto: Wisdom, Grace, Service
- Denomination: Anglicanism
- Patron saint: Saint George
- Established: 2015; 11 years ago
- Educational authority: WA Department of Education
- Oversight: Anglican Schools Commission
- Principal: Tina Campbell
- Chaplain: Father Rhys
- Years: 7–12
- Campus type: Urban area
- Website: www.stgeorges.wa.edu.au

St George's Anglican Grammar School is an independent Anglican co-educational secondary day school, With 2 campuses located within the Perth central business district, Western Australia, The first campus being at 50 William Street, Perth WA and their second campus opening from Term 3 2025 at 441 Murray Street, Perth WA.

== Overview ==
Students from Years 7 to 12 are accommodated in a middle school (Years 7 to 9) and senior school (Years 10 to 12). St George's Anglican Grammar School is a school of the Anglican Schools Commission (ASC). The school is Western Australia's first vertical school – one based in a high rise building rather than on a traditional campus.

St George's Anglican Grammar School opened in January 2015 as the 14th school of the Anglican Schools Commission. The ASC had acquired the independent Murdoch College, changed its name, and relocated it from the suburb of Murdoch.

In 2021, the school purchased a building at 441 Murray Street for a new campus. Construction to upgrade the building started in 2023 with students to start moving in 2025. On the 21st July 2025, the new 441 Murray Street, Perth campus officially opened.

In 2026, a new house was added to the school named Cowan, after Edith Cowan. The school now consists of 4 houses being Mandela (Nelson Mandela), Gandhi (Mahatma Gandhi), Lincoln (Abraham Lincoln), and the aforementioned Cowan.

== See also ==
- Anglican education in Australia
- List of schools in the Perth metropolitan area
