= El Amarillo Airport =

- IATA: none; ICAO: SCEA

Summary
- Airport type: Private
- Serves: Chaitén, Chile
- Location: El Amarillo
- Elevation AMSL: 1,083 ft / 330 m
- Coordinates: 43°00′25″S 72°28′44″W

Map
- Location of El Amarillo Airport in Chile

Runways
| Direction | Length | | Surface |
| Direction | m | ft | Surface |
|---|---|---|---|
| 01/19 | 492 | 1,614 | Grass |
- Source: Landings.com Google Maps GCM

El Amarillo Airport Spanish: Aeropuerto El Amarillo, (ICAO: SCEA) is an airstrip 21 kilometres (13 mi) east of Chaitén, a town in the Los Lagos Region of Chile. The Carretera Austral runs through the hamlet of El Amarillo, and passes the south end of the runway.

The airstrip is at the junction of two valleys, one running eastward from Chaitén, and the other, the valley of the Amarillo River, a glacial fed stream running south from the Chaitén Volcano.

The valleys open up to the southwest, but there is mountainous terrain in all other quadrants. The runway has an additional 140 metres (460 ft) of unpaved overrun on the south end.

The Chaiten VOR-DME (Ident: TEN) is 20.4 nautical miles (37.8 km) west-northwest of the airstrip.

== See also ==
- Transport in Chile
- List of airports in Chile
