= Mindarie, Western Australia =

Mindarie
- Suburb
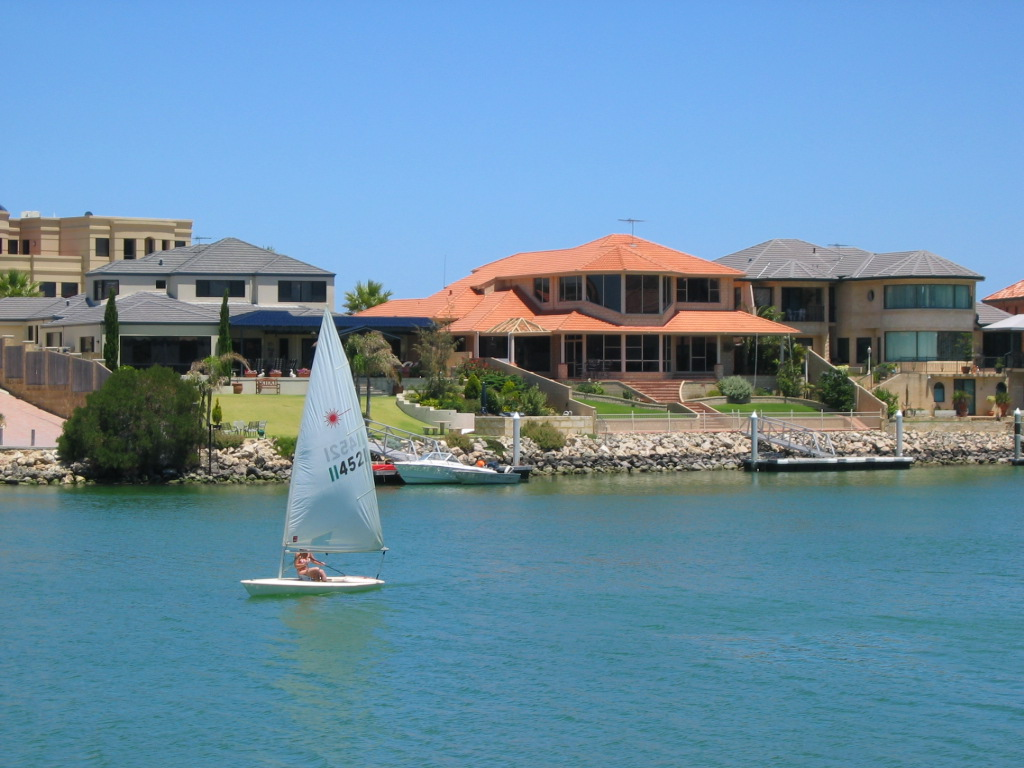
- Mindarie Keys
- Interactive map of Mindarie
- Coordinates: 31.688°S 115.707°E
- Country: Australia
- State: Western Australia
- City: Perth
- LGA: City of Wanneroo
- Location: 36 km (22 mi) from Perth
- Established: 1988

Government
  - State electorate: Mindarie
  - Federal division: Pearce

Area
  - Total: 4.6 km^{2} (1.8 sq mi)

Population
  - Total: 7,867 (SAL 2021)
- Postcode: 6030
Suburbs around Mindarie
	Quinns Rocks	Merriwa
Indian Ocean	Mindarie	Clarkson
	Tamala Park	Tamala Park

Mindarie is an outer coastal suburb of Perth, Western Australia. It is located 36 kilometres (22 mi) north of Perth's central business district, and forms part of the City of Wanneroo local government area.

After being briefly used for its limestone deposits in the early 20th century, the suburb was formally established in 1988 with the construction of the Mindarie Marina and hotel, one of the largest man-made marina resorts in the state. Several shops, restaurants and schools are now dispersed throughout the rest of the area, which is primarily residential in character. A number of large bushland reserves and parks preserve Mindarie's previously natural state, such as its large coastal dunes.

Mindarie was used as one of the filming locations for the children's science fiction television series Stormworld.

== Geography ==
Mindarie is formally bounded by Quinns Road, Marmion Avenue and the Indian Ocean. The suburbs of Clarkson and Merriwa lie to the east, and Quinns Rocks lies to the north. South of Mindarie is the uninhabited locality of Tamala Park.

Large swathes of natural bushland and coastline are preserved in various parks throughout the suburb, including Claytons Beach, Rosslare Park, Kinsale Park and the North and South Mindarie Foreshores. The foreshore reserves contain large Quindalup dunes and various examples of Swan Coastal Plain vegetation. The South Mindarie Foreshore was subject to coastal rehabilitation works in 2011 to protect the dunes and vegetation growing there.

== History ==
=== Name ===
Mindarie was named after Lake Mindarie in nearby Carabooda. The name is a Noongar word meaning either "stand by" or "green water", first recorded by Alexander Forrest in 1874. A town also named Mindarie, in the Murray Mallee region of South Australia, claims origin from a Dieri word meaning "festival to invoke peace".

The area was initially gazetted as "Clarkson" by the Shire of Wanneroo in 1979, with the name Mindarie being allocated to the adjacent locality directly east. The two names were transposed in 1985 at the request of Smith Corporation, the developers of the Mindarie marina.

=== Early use and limestone industry ===
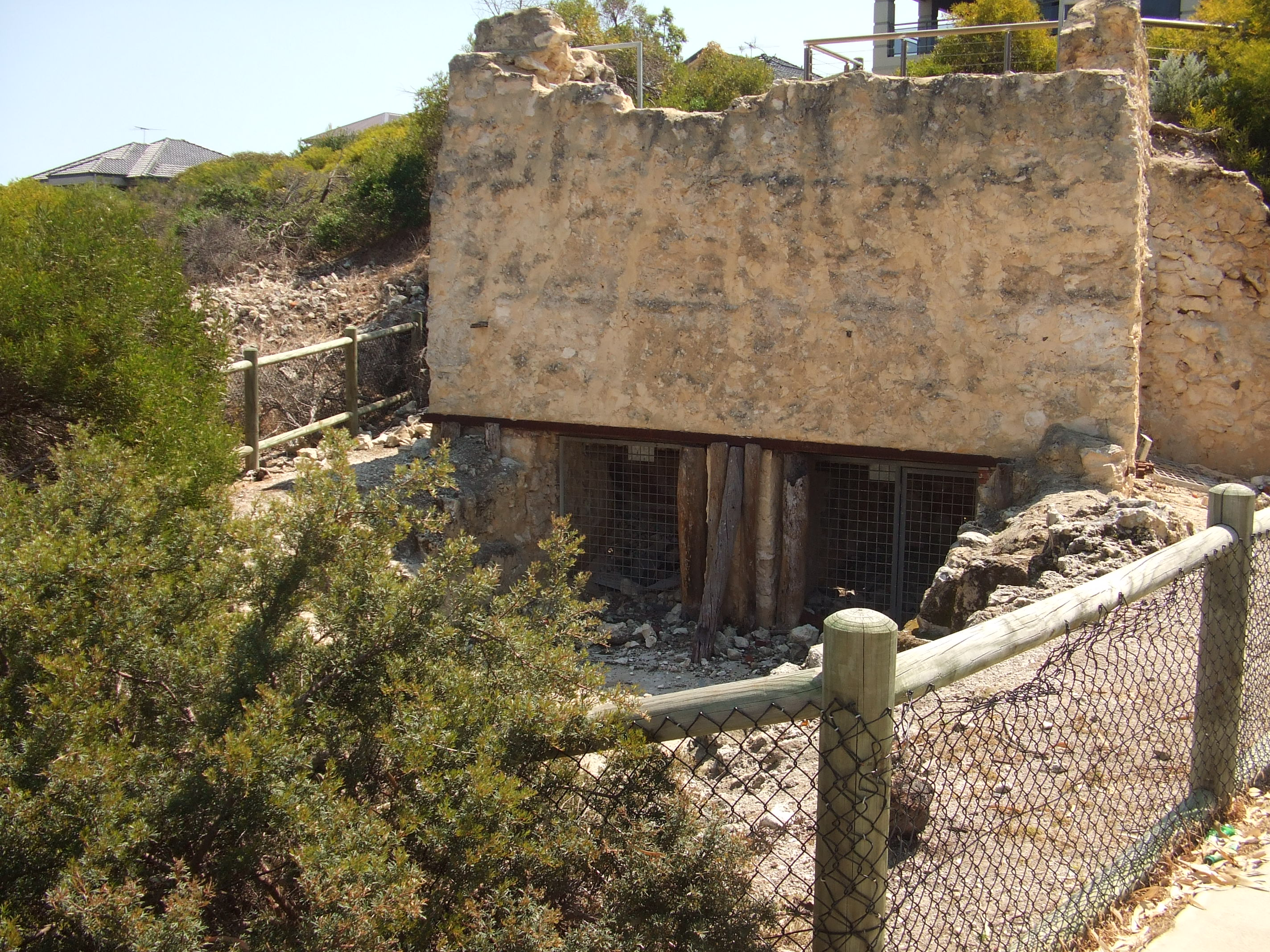
Cooper's lime kilns at Coopers Park

The Mooro group of Noongar were said to be familiar with Mindarie, including Waukolup Hill in neighbouring Tamala Park, but no Mooro settlements were ever formally established in the area. In a Mooro myth about Mindarie, two boys were brought to Mindarie by two tribal elders to learn the law. After the elders went out to hunt, the boys ventured off to find the Indian ocean. After they drank from the sea water, they went to see if the water tasted better further out, but were swallowed by the Wagyl and spat out as tuart trees.

After John Butler's initial expedition to Wanneroo in 1835, the first permanent European settler was sheep-farmer Bernard Clarkson, who first acquired a pastoral lease in 1888 of 13,000 acres in the areas comprising modern-day Mindarie, Clarkson, Quinns Rocks and Merriwa. The leases were known as the Mindarie Pastoral Company, and the lands were primarily used for sheep-herding by subsequent generations of the Clarkson family.

Other early settlers, Henry Cooper and his brothers, built two lime kilns at Mindarie in 1932 after the closure of their quarries in Wembley. The Cooper family produced and sold treated limestone in Perth and Fremantle as the Quinns Rocks Lime Stone Company, and were some of the first permanent residents of the nearby Quinns Rocks townsite. The kilns provided work for up to thirty-two labourers, who settled in Mindarie in makeshift jarrah shacks, and are commonly held as a symbol of the diversification of industry brought on by the Great Depression at the time. The Coopers ceased lime-burning operations in 1948 after exhausting good quality limestone supplies in the area.

The kilns underwent restoration in 2001 and are preserved today in the Coopers Park bushland reserve in Mindarie. They are regarded as sites of architectural interest, due to their skilled, vernacular design and their coastal location minutes away from the Indian Ocean, unusual for lime-burning operations in the Wanneroo area.

=== Marina and harbourside village development ===
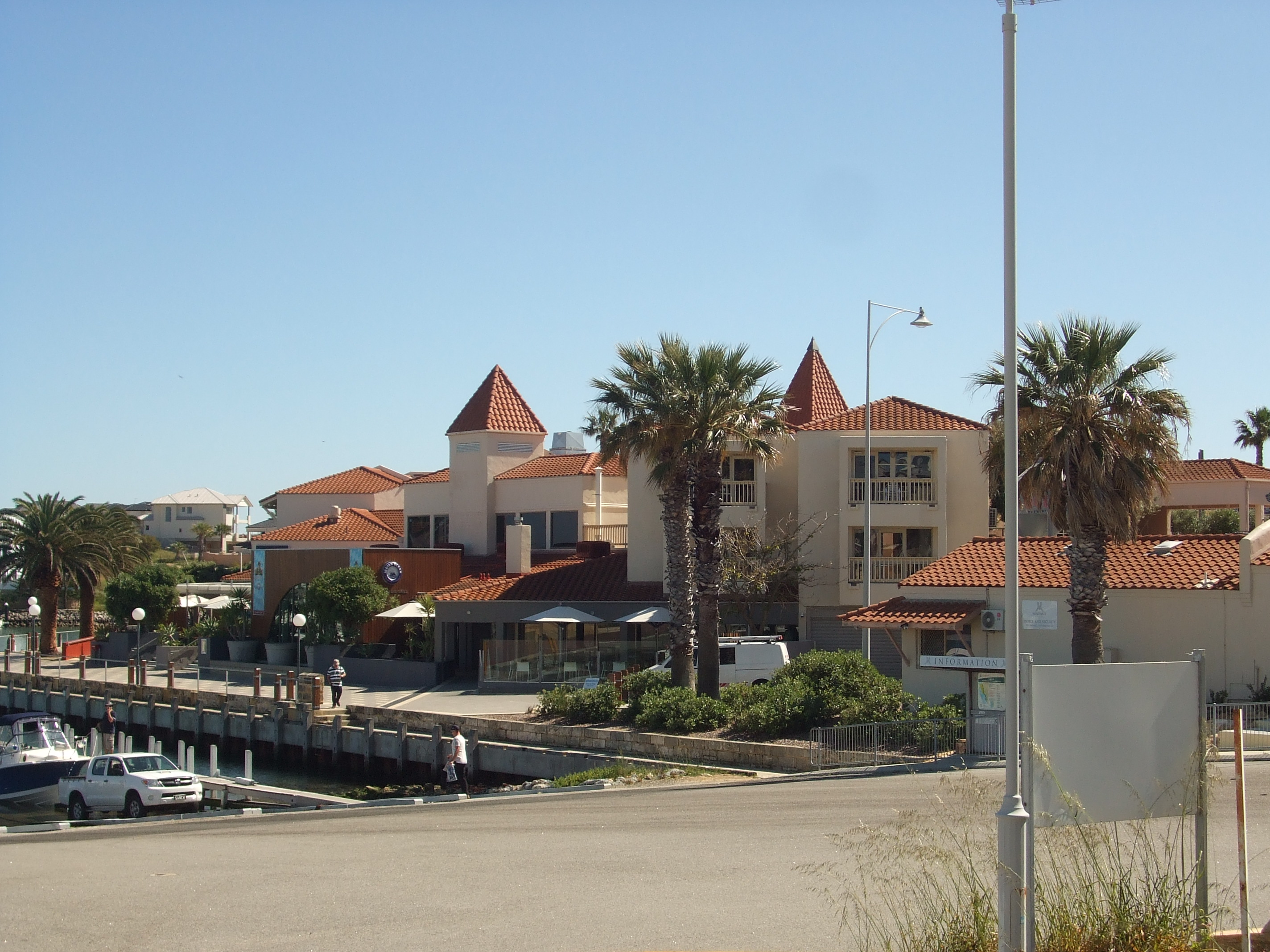
The Marina, Mindarie hotel

After the closure of the lime kilns, John Clarkson sold the Mindarie Pastoral Company leases in 1952, and the area remained unpopulated and unused until 1981, when Smith Corporation purchased 316 hectares of land there for $5.5 million. In July 1984, the company announced plans to develop the land into "Mindarie Keys", a $28 million marina and resort complex designed by James Christou & Partners, to be ready in time for the 1987 America's Cup in Fremantle. In the same year, plans were also proposed for a refuse disposal plant in the area to handle landfill waste from the Shire of Wanneroo, the City of Stirling and the City of Perth local areas. Both developments caused controversy with existing residents in nearby Quinns Rocks, who formed the Quinns Rocks Environment Group in June 1985 to bring together a formal opposition against the proposals. In 1988, Tamala Park was gazetted from land formerly part of southern Mindarie, and was set aside for refuse disposal, as well as public open space.

Due to the environmental and planning concerns surrounding the marina project, it did not receive final approval from the State Government until 1986, which was too late for construction to finish before the America's Cup defence began. Nonetheless, the first stage of Mindarie Keys development, including the harbour, marina and hotel, began in February 1988, and the first residential lots in southern and western Mindarie began to sell at the same time. During construction however, Smith Corporation and its joint venture partners ran into several problems, including massive cost overruns, unrealistic estimates of the land value and poor sales of the residential subdivisions surrounding the marina, brought on by the late 1980s recession. This was also compounded by cheaper, competing residential developments being sold in neighbouring Quinns Rocks.

The Mindarie Keys marina was finally completed and opened to the public a year later, at a total cost of $34 million. However, the aforementioned problems ended with Smith Corporation losing control of the project to their financiers, Beneficial Finance, who stalled further development and expenditure to focus solely on selling all remaining residential lots. The project eventually fell into the hands of receivers after the collapse of Beneficial Finance's parent company, the State Bank of South Australia, in 1991.

=== Mindarie Keys residential development ===
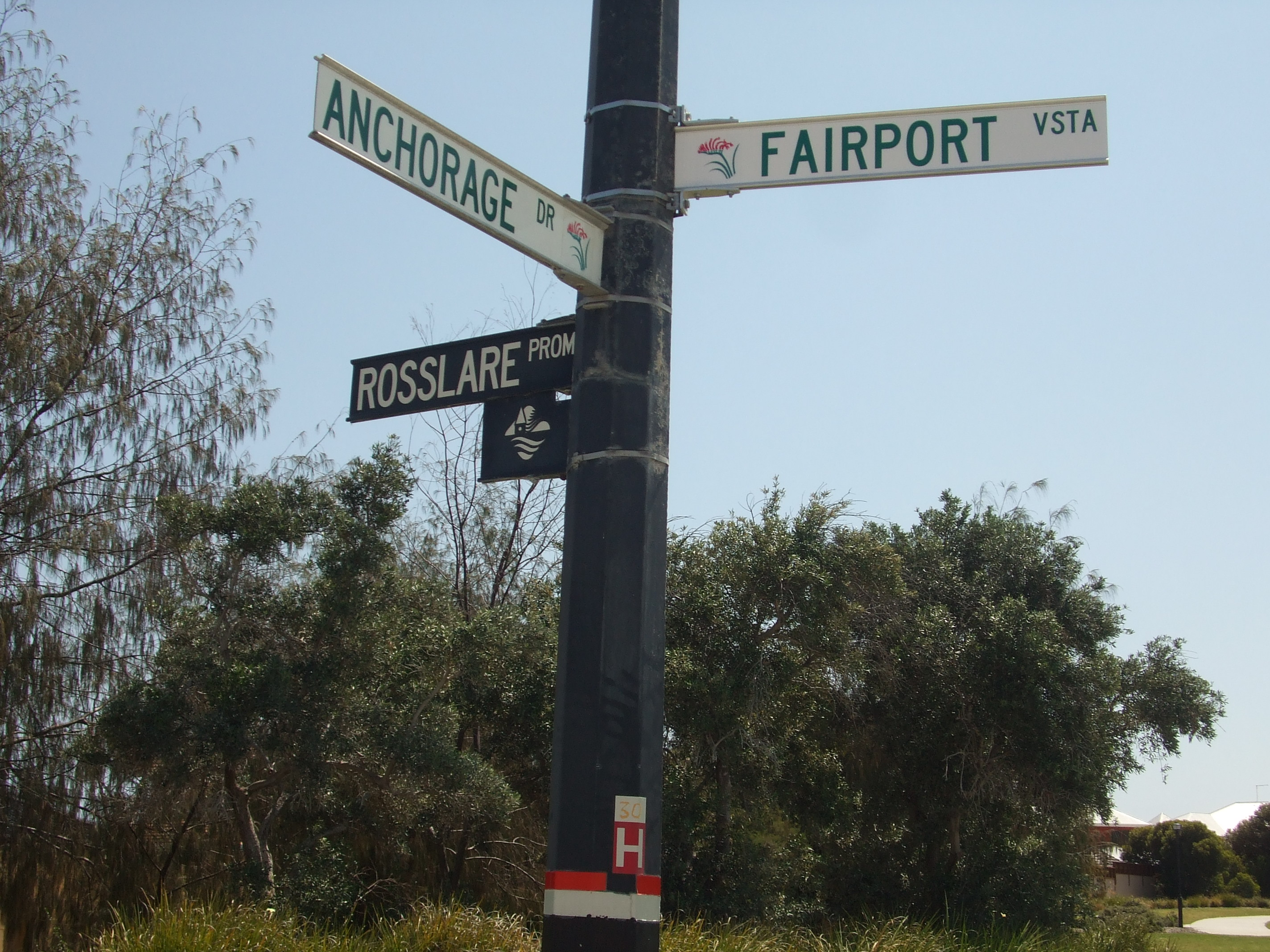
Lamppost with Mindarie Keys street sign

Mindarie Keys Joint Venture, a consortium of developers and investors led by Fini Group (now part of Mirvac), bought the fledgling Mindarie Keys project in 1996 from the South Australian Asset Management Corporation, after several years of receivership and lack of sales or development. The consortium devised a structure plan for new residential developments in the northern half of Mindarie, as well as the sale and development of older, unsold lots around the Harbourside Village. The new estate, which shares the name "Mindarie Keys" with the marina and harbourside village, was approved by the City of Wanneroo in 1998 and made Mindarie one of the highest-selling suburbs in Western Australia at the time.

The estate is bounded to the west by Anchorage Drive South and Seaham Way, to the south by Honiara Way and to the south-east by Rothesay Heights and Rochester Drive. The area is distinguished from the rest of Mindarie by unique, blue lampposts and street signs, featuring Mirvac's Mindarie Keys logo.

=== Catalina development ===
A new residential estate in Mindarie and Clarkson under the name of "Catalina" is being planned for development in 2012. The estate's proposed boundaries lay south of Neerabup Road (which is presently bushland blending into Tamala Park) and extend from the Joondalup railway line in eastern Clarkson, to the South Mindarie Foreshore in western Mindarie. Although the land is part of Mindarie and Clarkson at present, Satterley, the developers, intend for the estate to eventually be re-gazetted as its own suburb.

== Demographics ==
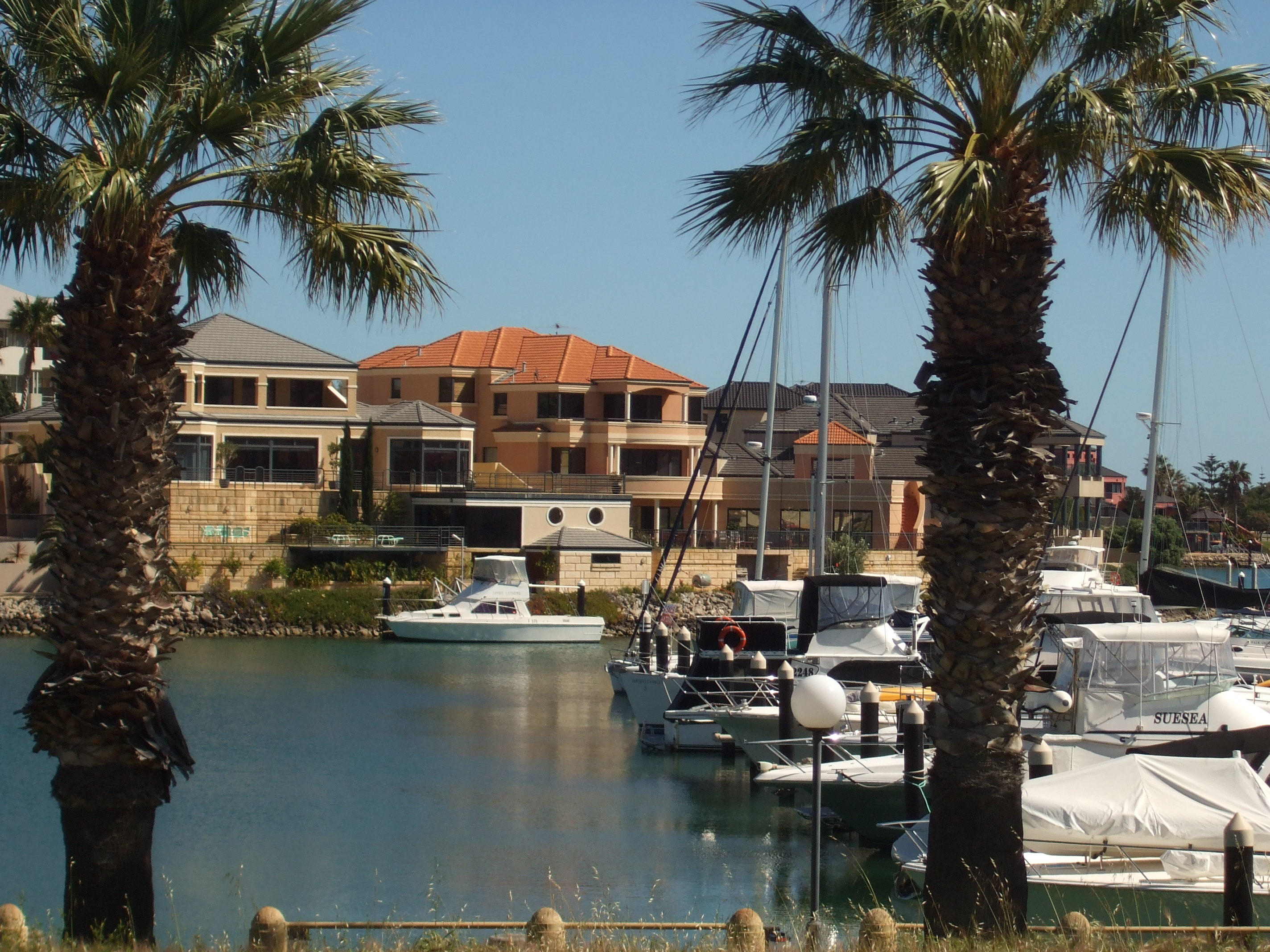
Mindarie Marina

Mindarie has a unique demographic profile, compared to surrounding areas. At the 2021 census, 7,326 people were resident in Mindarie, a slight decline from 7,520 in the 2016 Census. The population is predicted to continue growing at a steady pace, peaking at 9,782 in 2026. Of these, only 46.21% were born in Australia, compared to a national average of 70.9%. Mindarie contains a substantial British-born population of 31.27%, a disproportionately high figure compared to the surrounding coastal area, as well as the Australian national average of 5%. The median age of the suburb's residents was 36 years, in line with 37 for both the Perth region and Australia generally.

The predominant religious affiliation in Mindarie is Christianity, with 59.7% of residents declaring various Christian denominations. The only church in Mindarie is the Anglican Church of Australia in the suburb's north, in line with 31.2% of Mindarie residents declaring Anglicanism as their religion. Only 17.6% of the population declared no religion.

Mindarie is rated by the Australian Bureau of Statistics' 2006 SEIFA index as a higher socio-economic area, with an index of 1121 (95th percentile) for overall relative advantage/disadvantage. This is consistent with the median individual income of $586 per week and the median household income of $1,522 per week, both substantially higher than the metropolitan Perth average of $513 and $1,086 respectively. A much greater percentage of Mindarie's residents (19.4%) worked as technicians and trades workers compared to the regional average (16.0%), and the SEIFA data for education/occupation placed Mindarie in the 74th percentile.

== Amenities and facilities ==
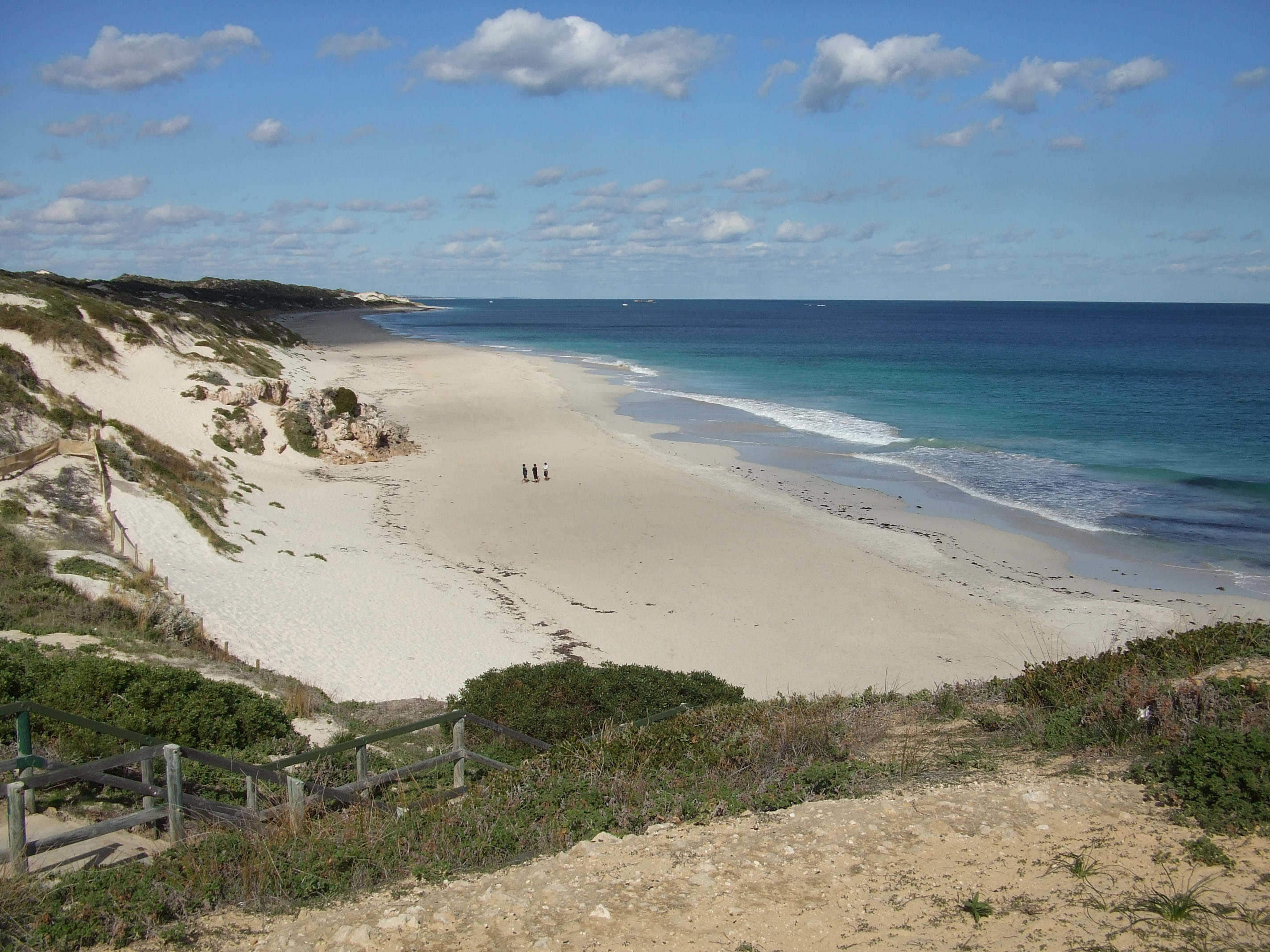
Claytons Beach

While Mindarie is a largely residential suburb, it does have a fairly large amount of infrastructure and amenities distributed at various points around the suburb. There are two minor shopping precincts in the northern and southern extremes of Mindarie, which include two service stations, various restaurants and take-away franchises (such as McDonald's and Red Rooster) and Basil's, an independent grocery store. Mindarie Keys Medical Centre, located in the south, provides medical care for the suburb's residents, as well as dental care and physiotherapy facilities. However, the large Ocean Keys Shopping Centre in Clarkson is situated adjacent to Mindarie on the other side of Marmion Avenue, catering to the suburb's residents for major commercial shopping needs and other public services.

Unlike the adjacent Quinns Rocks coastline, Mindarie's coastline is mostly taken up by the Mindarie Marina and its large harbour and breakwater. The marina itself has been a popular destination for tourism since its inception in the late 1980s. Along the boardwalk, the marina contains a three-storey hotel overlooking the harbour, two restaurants, a microbrewery and The Boat, a pub and restaurant. The Boat provides the majority of Mindarie's entertainment and nightlife.

Immediately south of the marina's breakwater is Claytons Beach, a small, unpatrolled beach that is a popular spot for surfers. The unoccupied bushland part of the beach, further south, runs through Tamala Park and into Burns Beach in the City of Joondalup. A vast number of parks and reserves are situated all around the suburb. Bellport Park contains tennis courts, while Lighthouse Park and Bellport Park both contain large, functional lighthouses. Along with the lime kilns in Coopers Park, they are considered local landmarks.

Telephone services are provided by the Mindarie & Quinns Rocks telephone exchanges. The former exchange is located in the south-east of Mindarie, on Rothesay Heights.

== Education ==
Mindarie is home to one K-6 primary school, Mindarie Primary School, which caters to the entire suburb. Senior Mindarie students are primarily in the catchment area for Clarkson Community High School. Students are also in catchment for Mindarie Senior College, built in the north of Mindarie in 2003, but the college caters for Years 11-12 only and chiefly accommodates leaving students from nearby Kinross College Years 7–10.

Students in Mindarie also have the option of private Christian schools, of which the suburb has two - Peter Moyes Anglican Community School (established in 2000) and Quinns Baptist College (established in 1996.) Both schools take in students from Kindergarten to Year 12, and are located next to Mindarie Senior College in a strip along Mindarie's northern boundary.

== Transport ==
Mindarie is linked to the rest of the Perth metropolitan area by Hester Avenue and Neerabup Road, which both interchange with the Mitchell Freeway and Wanneroo Road only a short drive to the east. The arterial highway Marmion Avenue also runs parallel to the freeway alongside Mindarie's suburb boundary, linking to Yanchep in the outer north.

Anchorage Drive South, Rothesay Heights and Bellport Parade act as the main backbone distributor roads throughout Mindarie. Anchorage Drive was initially planned as the suburb's singular arterial ring road, entering Mindarie from Marmion Avenue in the south, looping through the suburb and exiting back onto Marmion Avenue 2 kilometres further north. However, the Mindarie Keys Joint Venture later decided against fully completing the road due to the barrier it presented to inland residents, instead landscaping 700 metres of the reserved road as part of the adjacent Lighthouse Park. Although the landscaped parkland section is still gazetted as a road reserve, traffic studies performed on behalf of the City of Wanneroo in 2001 showed no need for the road to be completed.

=== Public transport ===
Mindarie is served by the 481 and 482 bus routes to Clarkson railway station, a hub that provides further bus and rail links to the nearby regional city of Joondalup, as well as the rest of the Perth metropolitan area. A deviation of the 481 also directly serves the marina on weekends.

==== Bus ====
- 479 Clarkson Station to Mindarie Marina – serves Portofino Promenade, Havana Way, Long Beach Promenade, Anchorage Drive and Ocean Falls Boulevard
- 480 Clarkson Station to Quinns Rocks – serves Marmion Avenue, Rothesay Heights, Bellport Parade, Salerno Drive and Quinns Road

Bus routes serving Marmion Avenue:

- 474 Clarkson Station to Joondalup Station
- 481 and 482 Clarkson Station to Butler Station

== Politics ==
Mindarie contains one polling booth at Mindarie Primary School. It was historically part of the electoral district of Wanneroo before becoming a member of Mindarie at the 2003 redistribution. It also forms the northern boundary of the federal Division of Moore.

Election results in Mindarie are unusual as they show strong support for the Liberal Party at both levels of government. This pattern is not shared by any of its neighbouring suburbs, such as Merriwa or Quinns Rocks, that consistently vote Liberal at federal elections and the Australian Labor Party at state elections. This is often attributed to Mindarie's reasonably affluent coastal part in the west, while the east is predominantly "mortgage belt" families, in line with other surrounding areas.

2022 federal election Source:
Labor	37.2%
Liberal	35.3%
Greens	11.2%
One Nation	4.4%

2019 federal election Source: AEC
Liberal	51.5%
Labor	22.3%
Greens	15.4%
One Nation	3.6%
United Australia Party (2013)	1.7%

2010 federal election Source: AEC
Liberal	61.5%
Labor	24.6%
Greens	9.1%
CDP	2.2%
Family First	1.6%

2007 federal election Source: AEC
Liberal	63.6%
Labor	27.4%
Greens	4.3%
CDP	1.4%
Family First	1.2%

2004 federal election Source: AEC
Liberal	65.5%
Labor	23.6%
Greens	4.98%
CDP	2.71%
One Nation	1.66%

2001 federal election Source: AEC
Liberal	53.2%
Labor	32.2%
Greens	5.20%
One Nation	4.75%
Democrats	3.08%

2008 state election Source: WAEC
Liberal	41.8%
Labor	40.7%
Greens	7.8%
Family First	2.8%
CDP	1.4%

2005 state election Source: WAEC
Liberal	45.5%
Labor	44.6%
Greens	4.37%
Family First	3.57%
CDP	1.91%

2001 state election Source: WAEC
Liberal	41.3%
Labor	37.5%
One Nation	8.34%
Greens	4.52%
Democrats	3.51%
