= Cathedral College Wangaratta =

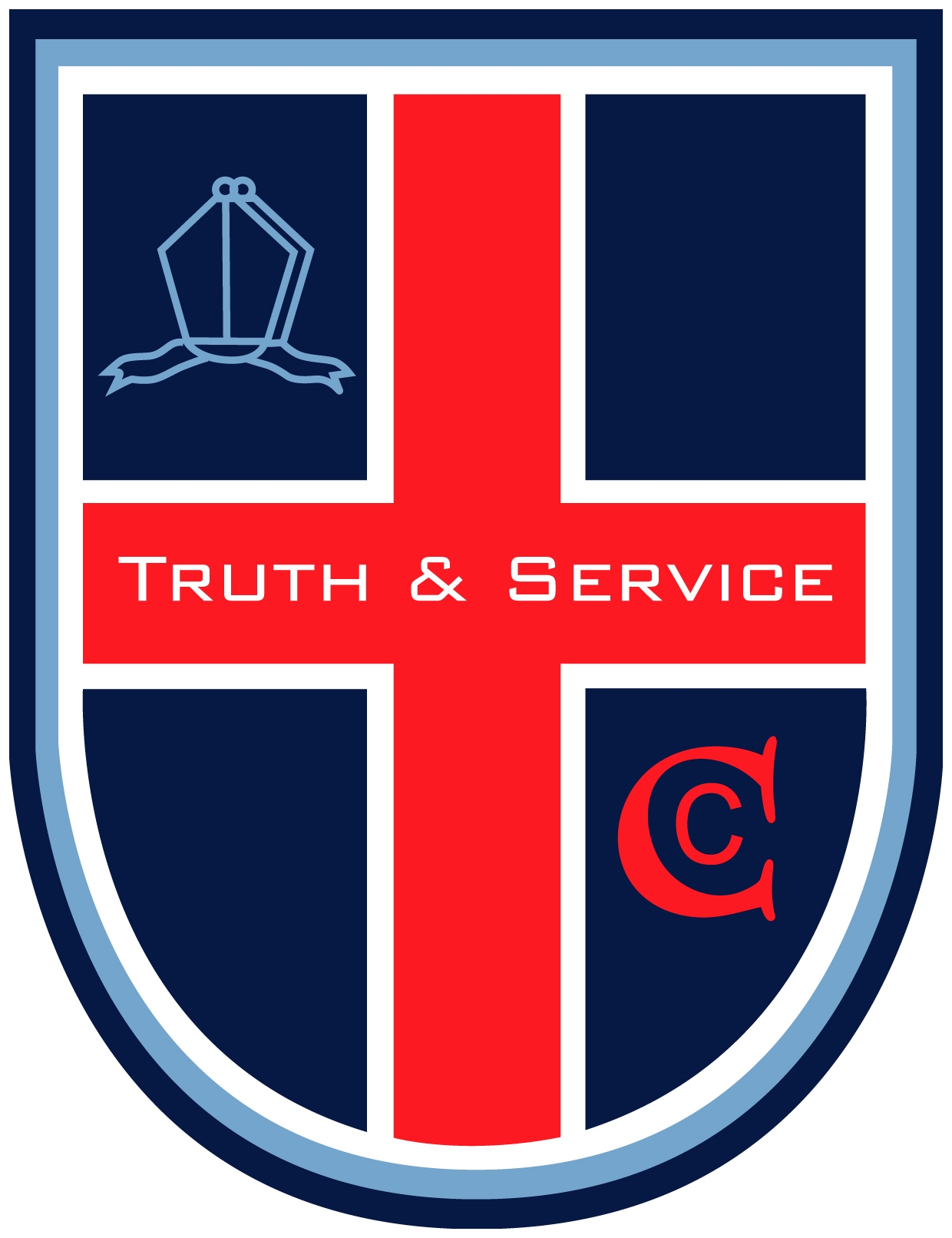

Location
- Murdoch Road Campus; 344 Wangaratta–Whitfield Road, Wangaratta, Victoria; Australia; 36°23′11″S 146°19′40″E

Information
- Type: private school co-educational primary and secondary day school
- Motto: Truth and Service
- Religious affiliation: Anglican Diocese of Wangaratta
- Denomination: Anglican
- Established: 2003; 23 years ago
- Status: Open
- Principal: Lauren Lee (Acting)
- Years: Prep to 12
- Houses: Buffalo, Cobbler, Feathertop, Hotham, Stirling & Warby
- Colours: Navy, light blue, red
- Affiliation: Anglican Schools Commission
- Website: cathedralcollege.vic.edu.au
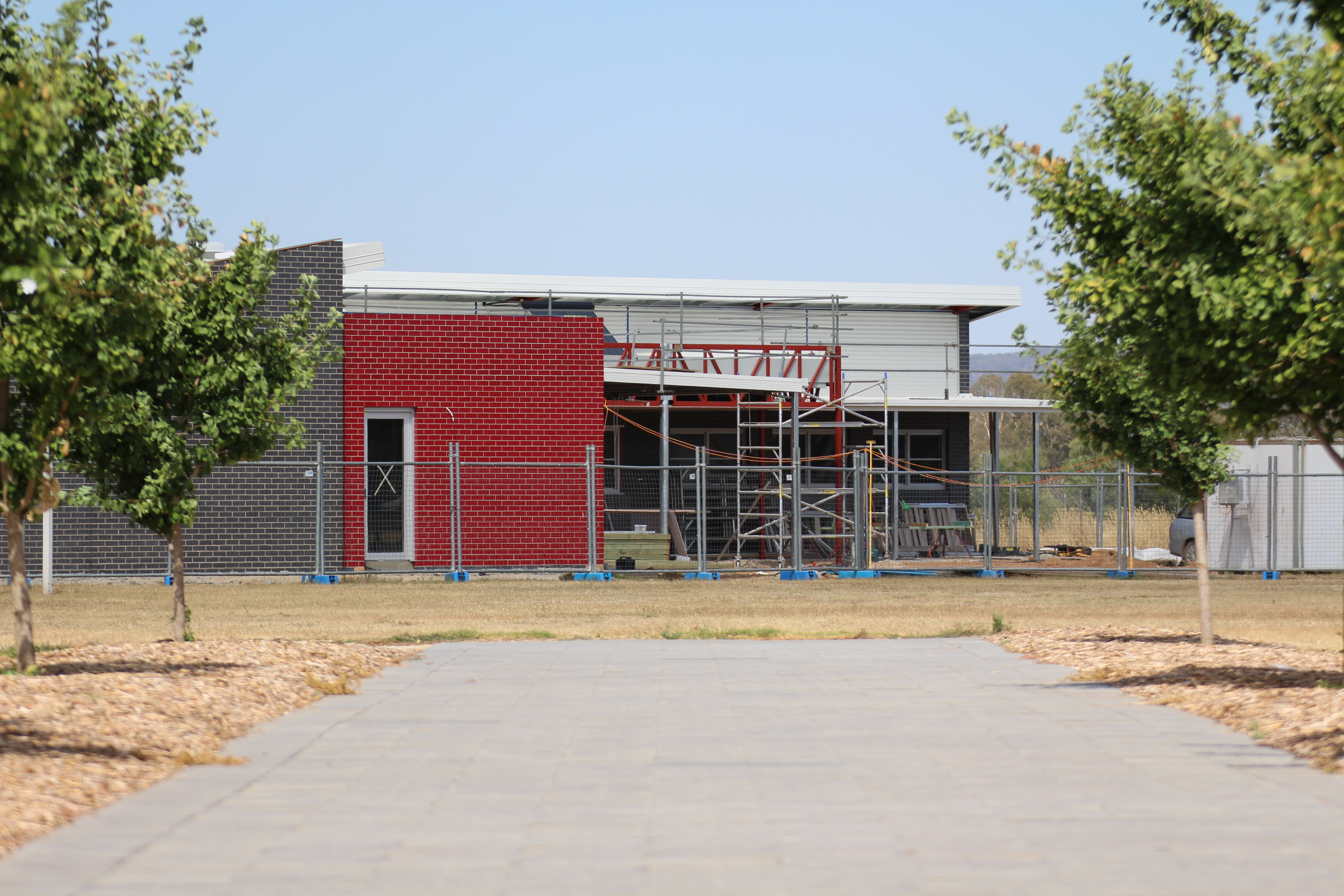
- New Science Centre, opened in July 2013

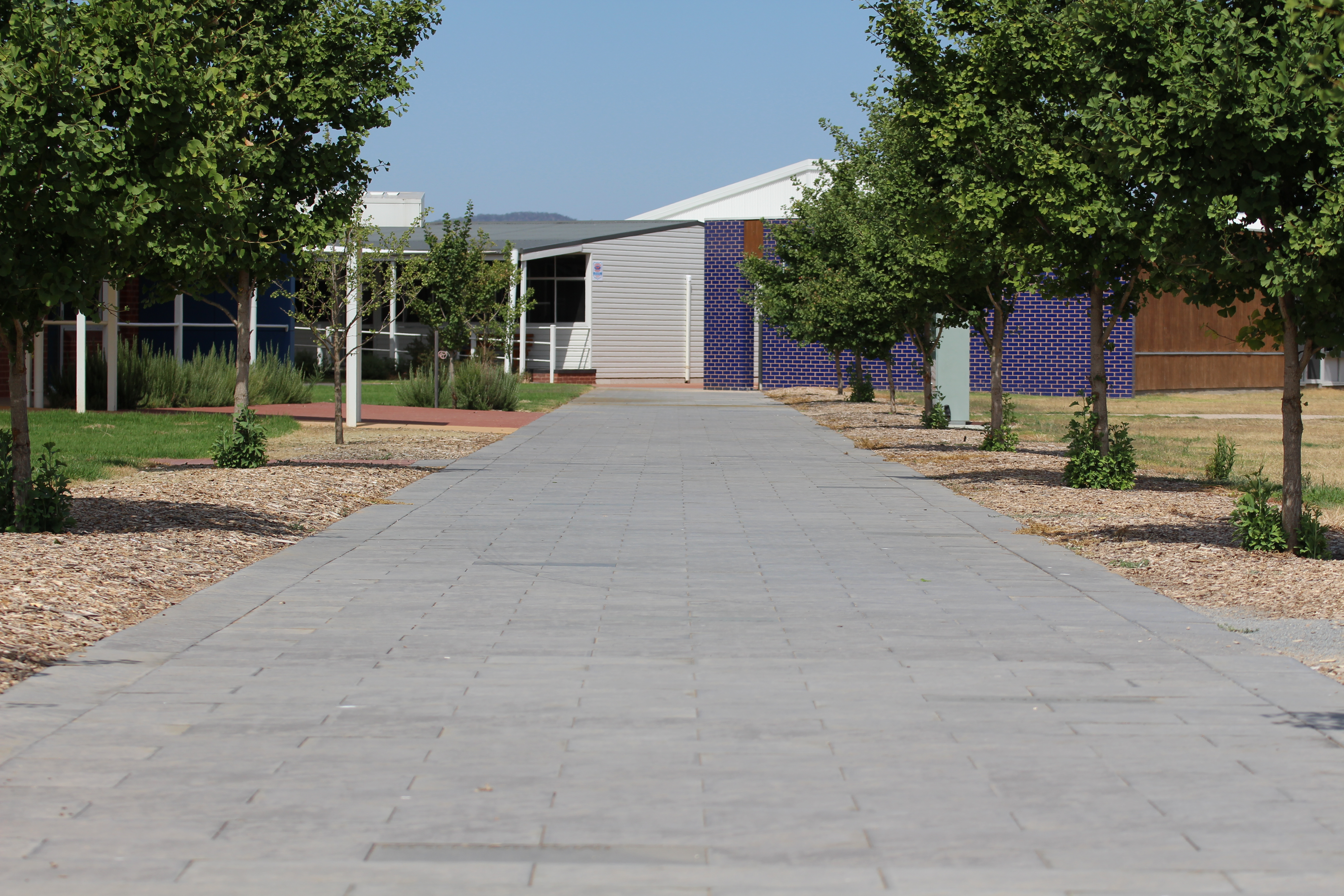
- Paths of Learning, leading to the library at the Murdoch Road Campus

Cathedral College Wangaratta is a private Anglican co-educational primary and secondary day school, located in Wangaratta, Victoria, Australia. Established in 2003, the school caters for students from Prep to Year 12. The motto of the college is "Truth and Service" which can be found on the school crest.

The current principal of Cathedral College Wangaratta is Nick Jones.

== Overview ==
In 2011, Cathedral College joined the Anglican Schools Commission. It was the first Anglican school to join that was not from Western Australia. Since then, several other local schools have become part of the Anglican Schools Commission, including Trinity College Albury and Cobram Anglican Grammar School.

Cathedral College phased out "The Close" senior campus in favour of a single, unified campus catering for years Prep to 12. This was effective as of the first day of school term for the 2015 school year. The school now has over 1000 students from Prep to Year 12 that are all housed on the "Murdoch Road" campus. Cathedral College was also ranked in the Nation's Top 50 Country Schools.

== See also ==
- List of non-government schools in Victoria
- Anglican education in Australia
