= Swan Christian Education Association =

- Formation: 1982
- Headquarters: Perth, Australia
- Members: 7 member schools
- Chairperson: Rob Edkins
- Website: www.scea.wa.edu.au

Swan Christian Education Association Inc (SCEA) is an organisation founded in 1982 to "establish and maintain Christian Schools". SCEA's first six schools were located in or near to the Swan Valley and Hills regions of Perth, though in 2017 it ventured into new territory by opening Northshore Christian Grammar School in Alkimos.

SCEA is governed by a volunteer board elected from and by Association Members. The board appoints a Chief Executive Officer to manage the organisation.

SCEA is a system member of the Association of Independent Schools of Western Australia.

== Schools ==
SCEA owns and operates the following schools:

- Beechboro Christian School - Kindergarten to Year 6. Opened 1991.
- Ellenbrook Christian College - Kindergarten to Year 12. Opened 2001.
- Geographe Grammar School - Kindergarten to Year 7. Opened 2011, closed in 2015.
- Kalamunda Christian School - Kindergarten to Year 6. Opened 1984.
- Mundaring Christian College - Pre-Kindergarten to Year 12. Opened 1988.
- Northshore Christian Grammar School - Kindergarten to Year 7. Opened 2017.
- Swan Christian College - Kindergarten to Year 12. Opened 1983.
- Southern Hills Christian College (formerly Armadale Christian College) - Kindergarten to Year 12. Opened 1980

Midland Christian School was a SCEA Primary school located on the same site as Swan Christian College. It opened in 1982. In 2009, it was amalgamated with Swan Christian College to form one school catering for Kindergarten to Year 12.
