= Peter Moyes =

Australian headmaster and education administrator

Peter Moyes AM OBE
- Born: 9 July 1917; Port Pirie, South Australia
- Died: 27 July 2007 (aged 90); Claremont, Western Australia
- Education: St Peter's College, Adelaide
- Occupations: Educator & education administrator
- Spouse: Judy Moyes
- Children: Christopher, Penny & Liz
- Parent(s): John & Helen Moyes

Peter Morton Moyes AM OBE (9 July 1917 – 27 July 2007) was the Headmaster of Christ Church Grammar School and Chairman of the Headmasters' Conference of the Independent Schools of Australia.

He was born as the fourth of six children to parents John and Helen Moyes. Educated at St Peter's College in Adelaide he moved with father to Sydney where he completed his education at The Armidale School, and finally the University of Sydney, where he graduated with a Bachelor of Arts degree in 1939.

He started his teaching career as assistant master at Canberra Grammar School, which was postponed by the outbreak of World War II . After returning from the Middle East, he volunteered to join militia units in Papua New Guinea, where he had been in support of Australian Brigadier Arnold William Potts. He was later appointed to the Z Special Unit, where he trained spies, but later returned home upon doctors orders.

Once the war ended, he and his wife, Judy travelled to the United Kingdom, where he became a Latin and History teacher at Winchester College in Hampshire. After three years, he returned to Australia, teaching at Geelong Grammar School. After spending two years in the role at Geelong Grammar, he came to Perth to take up the headmaster position at Christ Church Grammar School.

At the time of his appointment at Christ Church Grammar School, the diocese was considering closing the school. He set about strengthening the schools academic record, which increased student numbers from 259 when he arrived in 1951 to 1020 when he left in 1981.

After leaving Christ Church in 1981, he started to create lower-fee, co-educational, boarding, community-based Anglican schools. He structured the five schools he created to take advantage of the highest levels of government funding, using parent's resources to create a program with high parental involvement and using the available facilities of the wider community, such as sporting fields, rather than duplicating them. His model became a template for the development of Anglican education across Australia.

His influence stretched across South-East Asia, where he helped train school principals in the Philippines, Thailand and Malaysia.

Moyes was appointed an Officer of the Order of the British Empire in 1982 and a Member of the Order of Australia in 1995. He was awarded the Centenary Medal in 2001.

He died on 27 July 2007 and was survived by his widow Judy, and three children: Christopher, Penny and Liz.
