= Walter Road =

Road in Perth, Western Australia

Walter Road: Walter Road West; Walter Road East; Western Australia
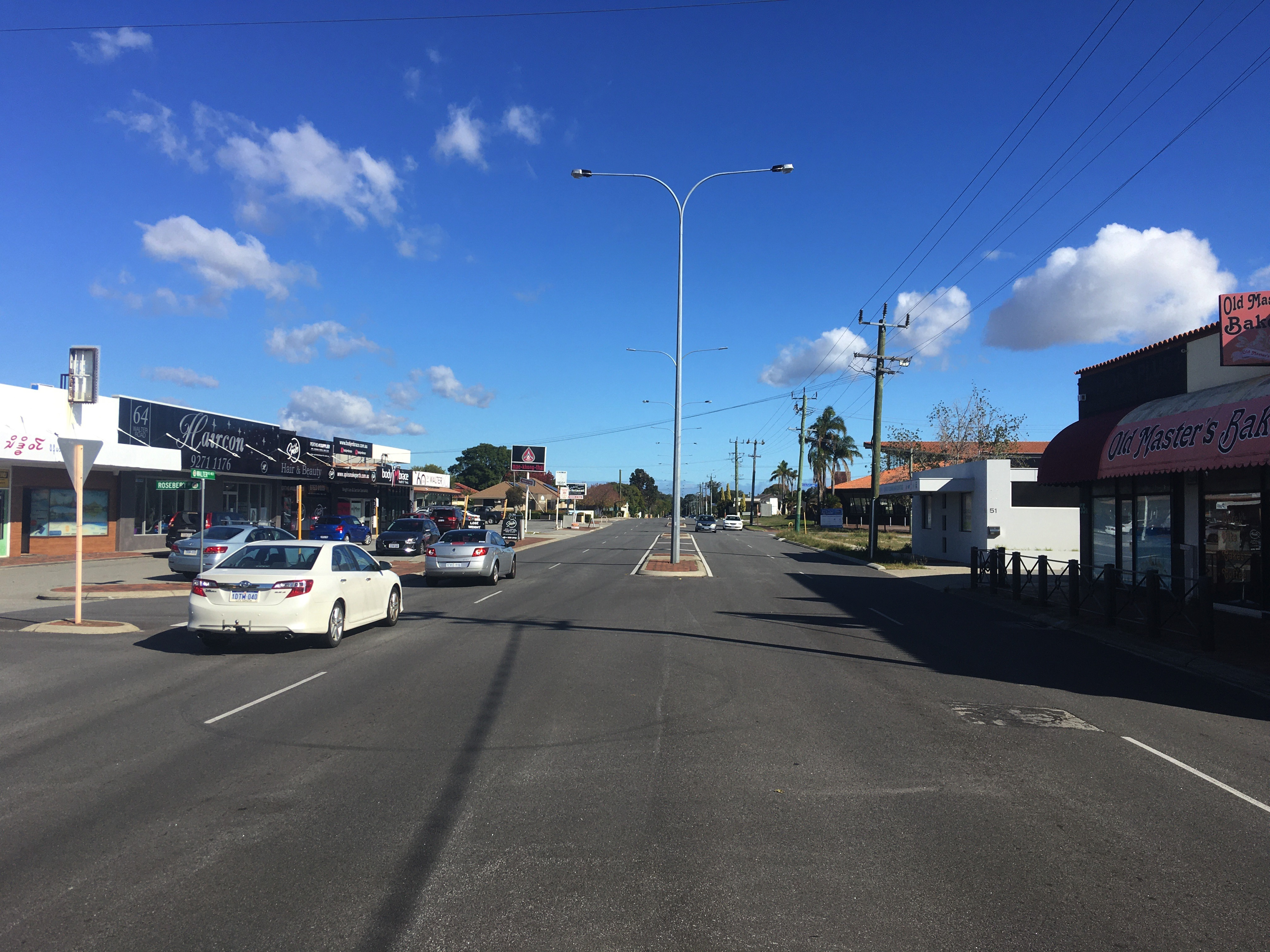
- Walter Road West near Rosebery Street

General information
- Type: Road
- Length: 8.3 km (5.2 mi)

Major junctions
Walter Road West
- West end: Hamer Parade Inglewood
- Grand Promenade (State Route 55); Collier Road
- East end: Cul-de-sac Morley
Walter Road East
- West end: Beechboro Road North / Broun Avenue Embleton / Bayswater / Morley
- East end: Lord Street Bassendean / Eden Hill

Location(s)
- Major suburbs: Inglewood, Dianella, Bedford, Morley, Bayswater, Bassendean, Eden Hill

Walter Road is a road in the north-eastern suburbs of Perth, Western Australia. Formerly a continuous road, it is now discontinuous at Tonkin Highway. The western section of the road is known as Walter Road West, and the eastern section of the road is known as Walter Road East.

== Route description ==
Walter Road has a speed limit of 60 kilometres per hour (37 mph) for its entire length.

=== Walter Road West ===
Walter Road West, which is 5.5 kilometres (3.4 mi) long, commences as a four lane continuation of Hamer Parade. 200 metres (660 ft) to the south-west, Hamer Parade terminates at a roundabout intersection with Central Avenue. From Hamer Parade, Walter Road West heads north, between Mount Lawley Golf Club and Walter Road Reserve. The road then bends to the north-east, passing through the urban areas of Inglewood, Dianella, and Bedford. The traffic light controlled intersections on this section are Dundas Road and Homer Street, Grand Promenade and Coode Street.

Approximately 3 kilometres (1.9 mi) after its western terminus, Walter Road West enters the Morley commercial district. To the south is the Galleria Shopping Centre, and to the north is Coventry Village. The road takes a bend to face it due east. Traffic light controlled intersections on this section are Russell Street, Wellington Road and Collier Road.

Walter Road West then exits the Morley commercial district after Collier Road, passing through housing in Morley. After the intersection with Crimea Street, which is a traffic light controlled intersection, Walter Road West is a two lane road. Near the road's eastern terminus, there is a roundabout with Embleton Avenue. Just to the east of the roundabout, Walter Road West terminates at a cul-de-sac. To the south of the roundabout, Embleton Avenue leads to Broun Avenue, which bridges over Tonkin Highway, leading to Walter Road East.

=== Walter Road East ===
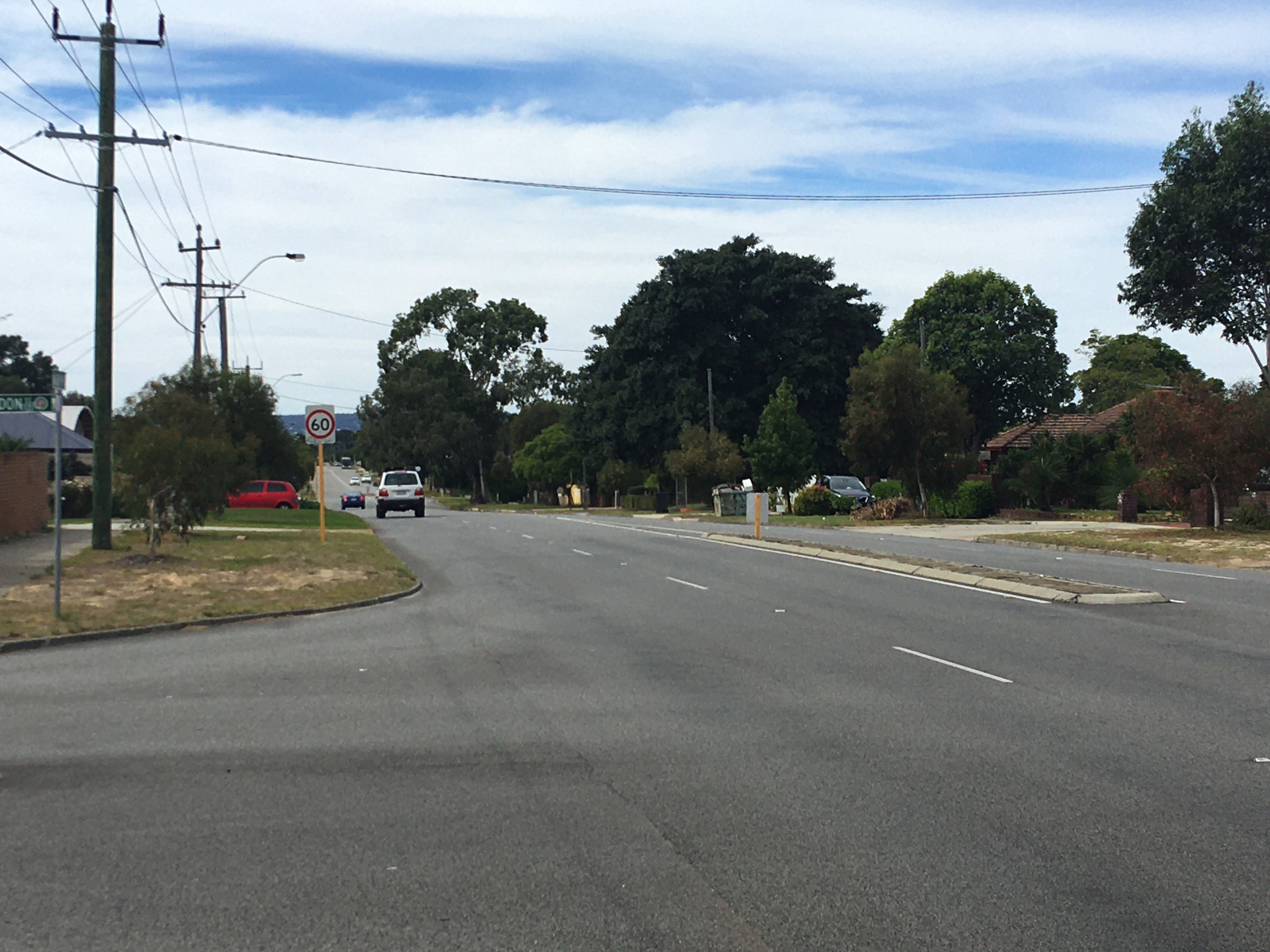
Walter Road East near Abingdon Street

Walter Road East, which is 2.8 kilometres (1.7 mi) long, commences as a four lane continuation of Broun Avenue at the intersection of Beechboro Road North. From there, the Road heads due east along the border of Bayswater / Morley, and later Bassendean / Eden Hill. Walter Road East briefly reduces to two lanes at the roundabout with Iolanthe Street, but otherwise remains a four lane road. The only set of traffic lights between the two termini is with Ivanhoe Street. The eastern terminus of Walter Road East is with Lord Street. There is a small, 100 metres (330 ft) section of Walter Road east of the Lord Street terminus that is cut off from the rest of the road.

== History ==
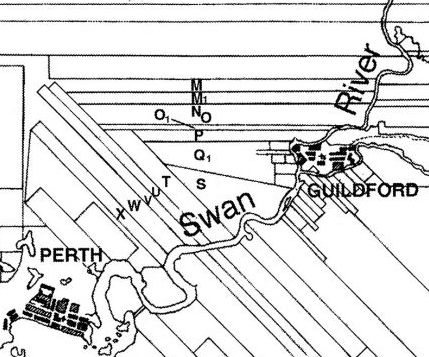
A track on the boundary of Q1 and P is the earliest sign of Walter Road

The earliest sign of what is now Walter Road was in the 1880s, as a track that followed the boundary of land grants Q1 and P. In 1887, the Perth Road Board decided to link the track to Perth. The route taken by the track is roughly the present day route of Walter Road, and it was used as an alternative route to reach West Guildford (now Bassendean). It was at first known as Government Road.

At some point in the early 20th century, the track was made into a plank road. A small rural community named Morley Park developed on Government Road. The Morley that exists today bears no visual signs of this early development. In May 1932, the Bayswater Road Board submitted an application for Commonwealth funding for widening and improving Government Road as a way of creating employment during the Great Depression. The works occurred during 1932 and the start of 1933.

In 1944, the Main Roads Department renamed Government Road to Walter Road. There are conflicting reports as to the origin of the name. One option is Walter Browne, who was born in Bayswater in 1903 and lived there for some time. Another possibility is Edgar Walter Hamer, who worked for Gold Estates, a property development company, and was Chairman of the Perth Road Board (precursor to the City of Stirling). Another possibility is Walter Padbury, who was a pioneer and politician.

In the 1960s, it was decided that Walter Road would be split into two when the planned Beechboro-Gosnells Highway was built. This was in line with the vision of Walter Road to be serving the Morley business district, rather than a through road. The highway, now named Tonkin Highway, was built in the early 1980s, splitting Walter Road into two sections. A bridge across Tonkin Highway was instead built at Broun Avenue just to the south of Walter Road. A small section of what used to be Walter Road is now Cherry Court.

In the mid 2010s, the City of Bayswater proposed to widen the section of Walter Road that goes through the Morley Activity Centre by 4.9 metres (16 ft) on both sides, in order to add a shared bus and cycling lane. This was later revised to 2 metres (6 ft 7 in), and then ditched altogether after opposition, particularly by the owners of Coventry Village, who would have had their outdoor dining area removed.

== Junction list ==
=== Walter Road West ===
| LGA | Location | km | mi | Destinations | Notes |
|---|---|---|---|---|---|
| Stirling | Inglewood | 0 | 0.0 | Hamer Parade – Mount Lawley, Inglewood | Walter Road West terminus; road continues south-west as Hamer Parade, with Hamer Parade branching off to the east |
| Stirling | Inglewood | 0.8 | 0.50 | Dundas Road south-east / Homer Street north-west – Dianella, Inglewood | Traffic light controlled intersection |
| Stirling–Bayswater boundary | Bedford–Dianella boundary | 1.6 | 0.99 | Grand Promenade – Bayswater, Bedford, Dianella | Traffic light controlled intersection |
| Stirling–Bayswater boundary | Bedford–Dianella–Morley tripoint | 2.6 | 1.6 | Coode Street – Bayswater, Bedford, Dianella | Traffic light controlled intersection |
| Bayswater | Morley | 3.2 | 2.0 | Russell Street – Morley | Traffic light controlled intersection |
| Bayswater | Morley | 3.5 | 2.2 | Old Collier Road south-east / Wellington Road north-west – Dianella, Morley | Traffic light controlled intersection |
| Bayswater | Morley | 4.0 | 2.5 | Collier Road – Morley, Embleton, Bayswater, Bassendean | Traffic light controlled intersection |
| Bayswater | Morley | 4.2 | 2.6 | Crimea Street – Morley, Noranda | Traffic light controlled intersection |
| Bayswater | Morley | 5.1 | 3.2 | Bath Road – Morley, Noranda | |
| Bayswater | Morley | 5.4 | 3.4 | Embleton Avenue – Embleton, Bayswater | Roundabout |
| Bayswater | Morley | 5.5 | 3.4 | Cul-de-sac | Walter Road West terminus |

=== Walter Road East ===
| LGA | Location | km | mi | Destinations | Notes |
|---|---|---|---|---|---|
| Bayswater | Bayswater–Embleton–Morley tripoint | 0 | 0.0 | Beechboro Road North north and south / Broun Avenue west – Perth, Bayswater, Morley, Beechboro | Walter Road East terminus; road continues west as Broun Avenue; traffic light controlled intersection |
| Bassendean | Bassendean–Eden Hill border | 1.7 | 1.1 | Iolanthe Street – Bassendean, Eden Hill | Roundabout |
| Bassendean | Bassendean–Eden Hill border | 2.1 | 1.3 | Ivanhoe Street – Bassendean, Eden Hill | Traffic light controlled intersection |
| Bassendean | Bassendean–Eden Hill border | 2.8 | 1.7 | Lord Street – Bassendean, Eden Hill, Lockridge, Beechboro | Walter Road East terminus; traffic light controlled intersection |

== See also ==
- List of major roads in Perth, Western Australia
