= Collier Road =

Road in Perth, Western Australia

Collier Road Western Australia
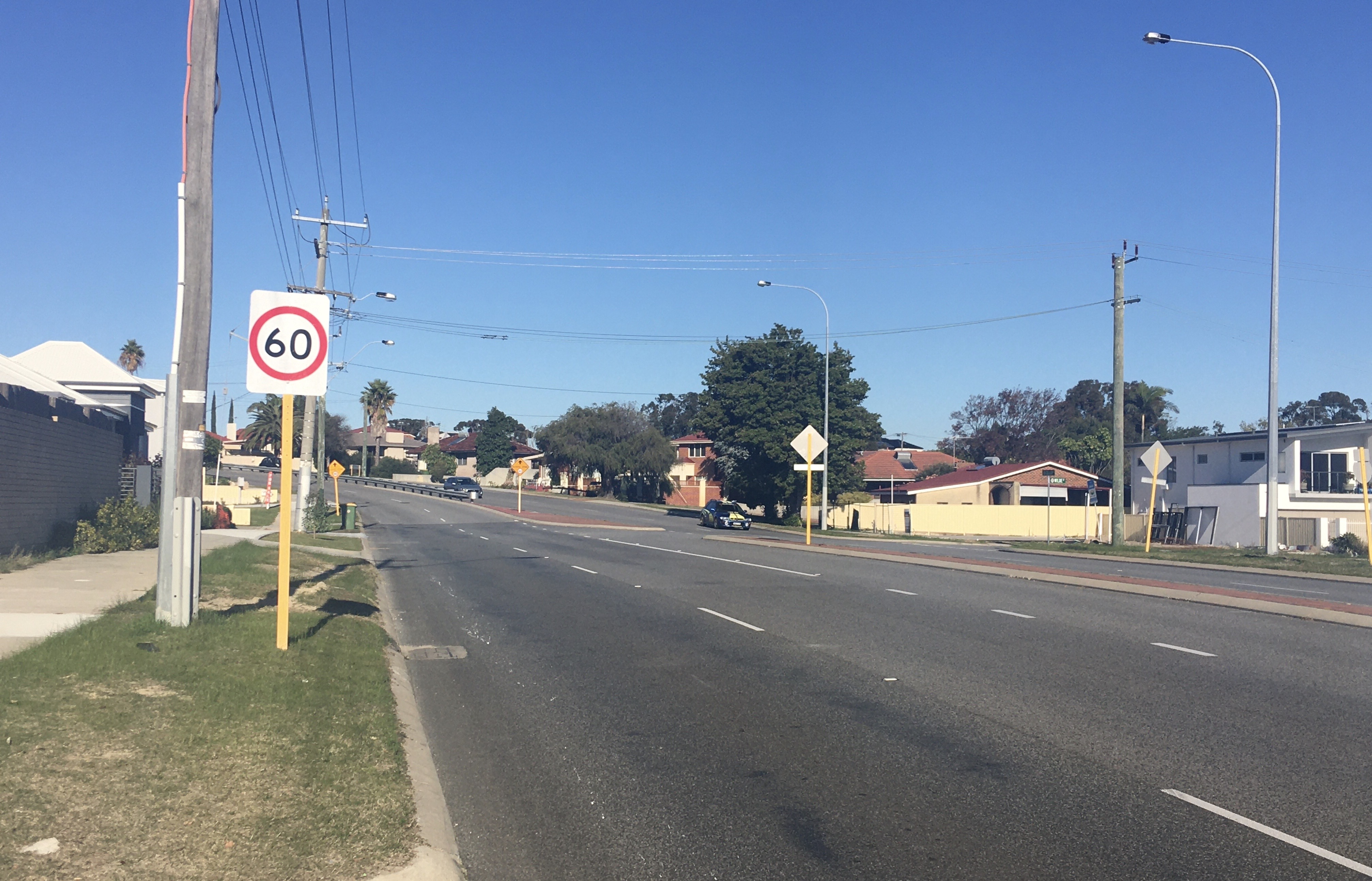
- Collier Road east of Broun Avenue in Embleton

General information
- Type: Road
- Length: 4.7 km (2.9 mi)

Major junctions
- NW end: Walter Road West
- Broun Avenue (State Route 53); Tonkin Highway (State Route 4)
- SE end: Guildford Road (State Route 51)

Location(s)
- LGA(s): City of Bayswater, Town of Bassendean
- Major suburbs: Morley, Embleton, Bayswater, Bassendean

Collier Road is a 4.7-kilometre (2.9 mi) main road in the north-eastern suburbs of Perth, Western Australia, linking Morley in the north-west to Bassendean in the south-east. It services an industrial area in Bayswater and Bassendean, the Morley business district, and connects to Tonkin Highway. Collier Road first existed as a gravel track in the 1910s. The 1950s and 1960s saw the land around Collier Road change from rural to urban. It has undergone a major realignment twice, first in the mid-1980s to make room for a larger shopping centre in Morley, and between 2016 and 2018, for the construction of an interchange with Tonkin Highway.

== Route description ==
Collier Road is a four-lane road for its entire length, with a speed limit of 60 km/h (37 mph) from Walter Road to Grey/Jackson Streets, and 70 km/h (43 mph) from Grey/Jackson Streets to Guildford Road.

Collier Road starts at a traffic-light-controlled T junction with Walter Road West in Morley. From there, it travels southwards, past the Galleria Shopping Centre and other various commercial buildings on the west, and residential housing on the east, bending a little to the east after 400 metres (1,300 ft). After 200 metres (700 ft), Crimea Street meets up with Collier Road at an unsignalised T junction. After another 200 metres (700 ft), Collier Road comes to a traffic-light-controlled intersection with Broun Avenue at the boundary of Morley and Embleton. From there, Collier Road is surrounded by residential houses in Embleton. After 200 metres (700 ft), the road bends to an easterly direction.

After 1 kilometre (0.6 mi) of straight road, there is a traffic-light-controlled intersection on the boundary of Embleton and Bayswater with Beechboro Road South on the south, and Embleton Avenue on the north. From there, Collier Road is surrounded on both sides by industrial buildings. After 400 metres (1,300 ft), at a traffic-light-controlled intersection with Wright Street, Collier Road changes name to Collier Link. Collier Road is instead used as the name for minor access road 100 metres (300 ft) north. After 300 metres (1,000 ft), Collier Link comes to a single-point urban interchange by which it overpasses Tonkin Highway.

After 300 metres (1,000 ft), Collier Link comes to a traffic-light-controlled intersection on the boundary of the City of Bayswater and the Town of Bassendean, with Jackson Street on the south and Grey Street on the north. The road changes name back to Collier Road. For 1.7 kilometres (1.1 mi), Collier Road bends north and then south, mostly through an industrial area, but with some residential on the east, near the end, where it crosses the Midland railway line at a level crossing and terminates at a T junction with Guildford Road.

== History ==
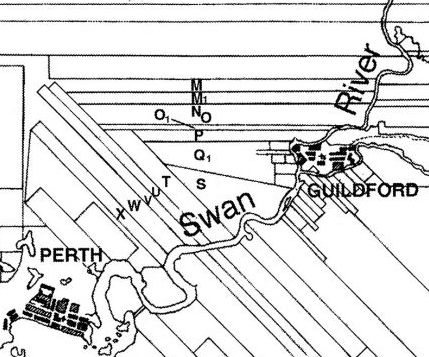
Collier Road was built on the border of Locations Q, S and T.

Collier Road has existed as far back as the early 1910s, being built along the border of several land grants by the Bayswater Road Board, the precursor to the City of Bayswater, as part of an agreement with the landowners. The road was built out of gravel. Later, the road was named Collier Road, after Philip Collier, the Premier of Western Australia from 1924 to 1930.

In 1956, the Morley business district was zoned, centring on the corner of Collier Road and Walter Road. The late 1950s and early 1960s saw the land around Collier Road change from rural to suburban, as the suburbs of Morley and Embleton were developed. The 1960s saw the modernisation of Collier Road, with its steep hills flattened to gentle slopes.

The decline of drive-in theatres had caused the Wirrina Drive-In, on the corner of Collier Road and Walter Road, to close in 1980. This provided an opportunity for realigning Collier Road to go along the eastern edge of the Morley business district, to allow the construction of one large shopping centre. At the time, Collier Road continued straight through the Morley business district, meeting up at an intersection with Walter Road and Wellington Road. Long standing businesses in the area, especially those along Collier Road, were strongly opposed to the idea, but the Bayswater council was for it. The realignment occurred in the middle of the 1980s, allowing the Galleria Shopping Centre to be constructed. Remnants of the old alignment remain, with a small portion of Collier Road, now named Old Collier Road used as an entrance to the Galleria Shopping Centre.

Collier Road was being modified on its other end as well. On 16 December 1986, Collier Road was extended from Alice Street in Bassendean to Guildford Road.

Between mid-2016 and early 2018, as part of the NorthLink WA construction project, Collier Road was realigned between Wright Street and Grey/Jackson Streets. A single-point urban interchange was built at the junction of Collier Road and Tonkin Highway, replacing the previous at-grade intersection. Also, traffic lights were added to Collier Road's junctions with Wright Street and Grey/Jackson Streets. The project's purpose was to make Tonkin Highway freeway standard and to replace the intersection of Collier Road and Tonkin Highway, which was the third most congested intersection in Western Australia in 2016.

Due to the realignment, either the new or old road had to be renamed. City of Bayswater officers suggested the names Walkenden Road for the bypassed section of Collier Road west of Tonkin Highway, Greenaish Road east of Tonkin Highway, and a small portion of Spencer Street north of Collier Road to Seal Street, but those suggestions were not accepted at a planning committee meeting on 20 June 2017. Local businesses on the bypassed section of Collier Road wanted it to keep its name, and rename the new section of Collier Road, saying that they could lose money and have to change things such as contracts and banking details. On 14 August 2017, City of Bayswater councillors and staff, Landgate, NorthLink WA, and affected businesses met, and all agreed to keep the name Collier Road for the existing section of road, and name the new section of road something else. On 22 August 2017, the City of Bayswater council resolved to keep the name Collier Road for the existing section of road, with the new section to be named Collier Link, and the northern part of Spencer Street renamed Seal Street.

== Future ==
The state government's long term vision is for the Collier Road level crossing with the Midland railway line to be removed by grade separation. However it is not a priority as there are more congested level crossings in Perth, and there are no detailed plans or funding for it.

== Junction list ==
LGA	Location	km	mi	Destinations	Notes
Bayswater	Morley	0.0	0.0	Walter Road West – Bedford, Dianella, Inglewood	Collier Road north-western terminus; traffic-light-controlled T junction
Bayswater	Morley	0.6	0.37	Crimea Street – Noranda, Malaga	T junction
Bayswater	Morley–Embleton boundary	0.8	0.50	Broun Avenue (State Route 53) – Perth, Mount Lawley, Eden Hill	Traffic-light-controlled intersection
Bayswater	Embleton–Bayswater boundary	2.0	1.2	Beechboro Road South south / Embleton Avenue north – Bayswater, Embleton, Morley	Traffic-light-controlled intersection
Bayswater	Bayswater	2.4	1.5	Wright Street south / Collier Road north – Bayswater	South-eastbound traffic continues on Collier Link; North-westbound traffic continues on Collier Road; Traffic-light-controlled intersection
Bayswater	Bayswater	2.7	1.7	Tonkin Highway (State Route 4) – Perth Airport, Kelmscott	Single-point urban interchange
Bayswater–Bassendean boundary	Bayswater–Bassendean boundary	3.0	1.9	Jackson Street south / Grey Street north	South-eastbound traffic continues on Collier Road; North-westbound traffic continues on Collier Link; Traffic-light-controlled intersection
Bassendean	Bassendean	4.6	2.9	Midland railway line	Level crossing
Bassendean	Bassendean	4.7	2.9	Guildford Road (State Route 51) – Perth, Guildford, Midland	Collier Road south-eastern terminus; Traffic-light-controlled T junction
Route transition
