= Beaufort Street =

Road in Perth, Western Australia

Beaufort Street Western Australia
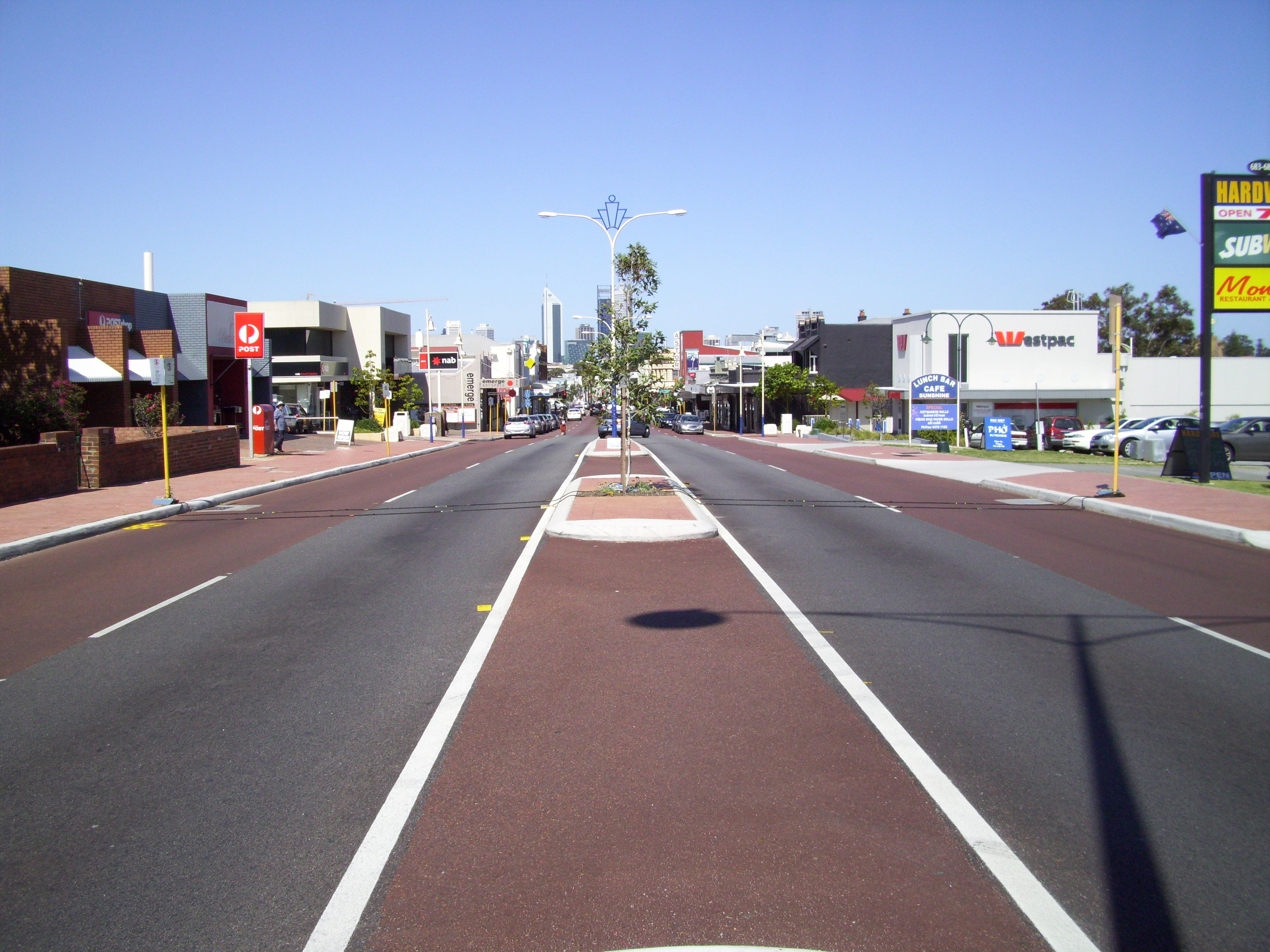
- View south-west, in Mount Lawley

General information
- Type: Road
- Length: 6 km (3.7 mi)
- Opened: 1900s
- Route number(s): State Route 53

Major junctions
- Southwest end: Wellington Street (State Route 65), Perth
- Walcott Street (State Route 75); Grand Promenade (State Route 55); Broun Avenue (State Route 53)
- Northeast end: Cul-de-sac near Coode Street, Bedford

Location(s)
- Major suburbs: Highgate, Mount Lawley, Inglewood

Beaufort Street is a major road in the inner north-eastern suburbs of Perth, Western Australia, connecting the Morley area to the Perth central business district. For most of its length, it is a single-carriageway, two-way road with two lanes in each direction.

The street played host to the community focused Beaufort Street Festival from 2010 to 2015. In 2013, over 120,000 people attended the festival, making it one of Perth's largest street festivals.

== Route description ==
Beaufort Street begins at Wellington Street in the Perth central business district, continuing north from Barrack Street. It heads northeast towards the Morley area, terminating in a cul de sac near Coode Street. Another section of Beaufort Street runs between Coode Street and Drake Street. It is part of State Route 53, which connects The Esplanade in Perth, near Swan Bells, to Tonkin Highway in Cullacabardee, at the southern edge of Whiteman Park.

Beaufort Street is a popular shopping and eating strip, especially in Mount Lawley and Inglewood. The Astor Cinema is also on Beaufort Street.

It is one of the most heavily patronised bus corridors in Perth, served by Transperth's most frequent suburban bus route 950 and limited stops route 66 for its entire length, and by routes 67 and 68 between Perth and Grand Promenade, Bedford.

== History ==
Beaufort Street has existed since at least 1848. The road was macadamised in 1870. The road was initially built to service the Mount Lawley area in the early 19th century.

In 1907, work began on reconstructing the Beaufort Street Bridge, which connected the road to Wellington Street over the railway line.

In 1929, the Town Planning Commission viewed Beaufort Street to be an important arterial road in the future, and agreed with the Bayswater Road Board's plans to extend the road through to Collier Road by resuming land.

Between Wellington Street and Brisbane Street, it was a one-way road, as the continuation of Barrack Street, with southbound traffic directed along Brisbane Street onto William Street. From 7 April 2013, two-way traffic was reintroduced along Beaufort Street. The project also introduced part-time bus lanes, operational (in one direction) during peak times, and available for parking at other times.

Beaufort Street was widened between Central Avenue, Inglewood and Queens Crescent, Mount Lawley. The project was expected to take ten months to complete, from July 2013 to April 2014. Beaufort Street's intersection with Central Avenue was also upgraded, with additional turning lanes and modified traffic light signals. The works enabled the road lanes to be reconfigured as one bus priority lane plus one traffic lane in each direction. A new central median island prevents right turns at most locations along the road.

== Major intersections ==
All intersections listed are signalised unless otherwise mentioned.

| LGA | Location | km | mi | Destinations | Notes |
|---|---|---|---|---|---|
| Bayswater | Embleton | 0 | 0.0 | Drake Street | Northern terminus of minor street section; Unsignalised intersection. |
| Bayswater | Embleton–Bedford boundary | 0.3 | 0.19 | Coode Street – Morley, Bayswater | Southern terminus of minor street section; Cul de sac on southern side; Unsignalised intersection. |
| Bayswater | Bedford | 0.4 | 0.25 | Broun Avenue (State Route 53) – Morley, Bayswater, Eden Hill | State Route 53 concurrency terminus. Southwest bound local traffic turns left, north-eastbound local traffic turns right; Unsignalised intersection. |
| Bayswater | Bedford | 1.2 | 0.75 | Grand Promenade (State Route 55) – Dianella, Bayswater | |
| Stirling | Inglewood–Mount Lawley boundary | 2.7 | 1.7 | Central Avenue – Menora, Maylands | |
| Stirling–Vincent boundary | Mount Lawley | 4.2 | 2.6 | Walcott Street (State Route 75) – Coolbinia, Menora, North Perth | No right turns permitted between both streets. |
| Vincent | Mount Lawley | 4.5 | 2.8 | Vincent Street – Leederville | Unsignalised intersection; no right turn permitted between Vincent Street and Beaufort Street south. |
| Vincent | Perth | 5.2 | 3.2 | Bulwer Street (State Route 72) – Leederville, Wembley, City Beach | No right turn permitted between Beaufort Street north and Bulwer Street east during peak hours. |
| Vincent | Perth | 5.4 | 3.4 | Brisbane Street | |
| Vincent–Perth boundary | Perth | 5.8 | 3.6 | Newcastle Street – Leederville | Access to Graham Farmer Freeway |
| Perth | Perth | 6.0 | 3.7 | Aberdeen Street – Northbridge | |
| Perth | Perth | 6.3 | 3.9 | Roe Street – Northbridge, West Perth | |
| Perth | Perth | 6.4 | 4.0 | Wellington Street (State Route 65) – West Perth, East Perth | Southern terminus, continues south as Barrack Street (State Route 53) |
1.000 mi = 1.609 km; 1.000 km = 0.621 mi: Incomplete access; Route transition
