= Morley Drive =

Road in Perth, Australia

Morley Drive Western Australia
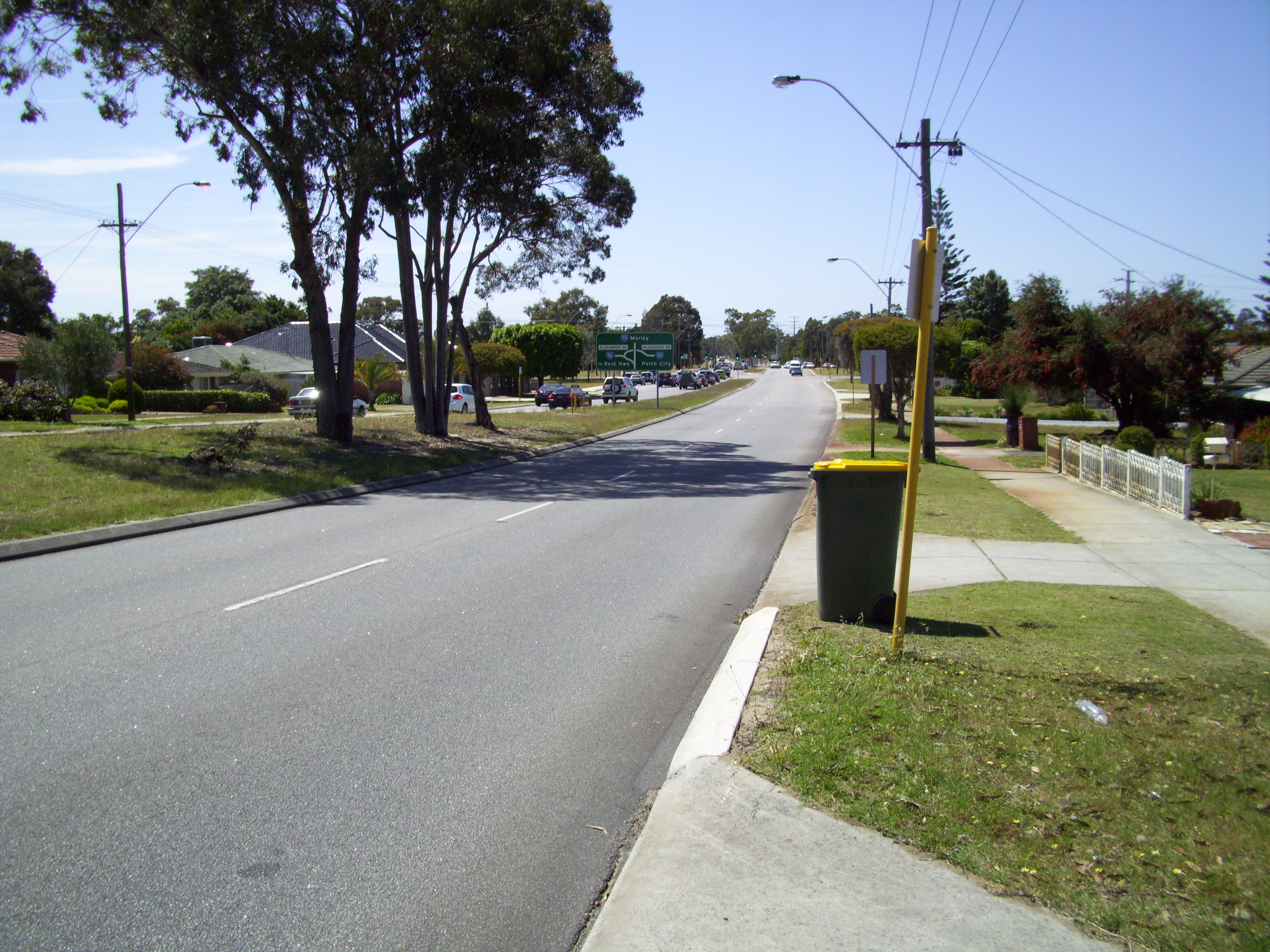
- View east from Dianella

General information
- Type: Highway
- Length: 8.6 km (5.3 mi)
- Opened: 1970s
- Route number(s): State Route 76

Major junctions
- West end: Main Street, Balcatta
- Wanneroo Road (State Route 60); Grand Promenade (State Route 55); Alexander Drive (State Route 56)
- East end: Tonkin Highway (State Route 4), Morley

Location(s)
- Major suburbs: Nollamara, Dianella, Morley

Highway system
- Highways in Australia; National Highway • Freeways in Australia; Highways in Western Australia

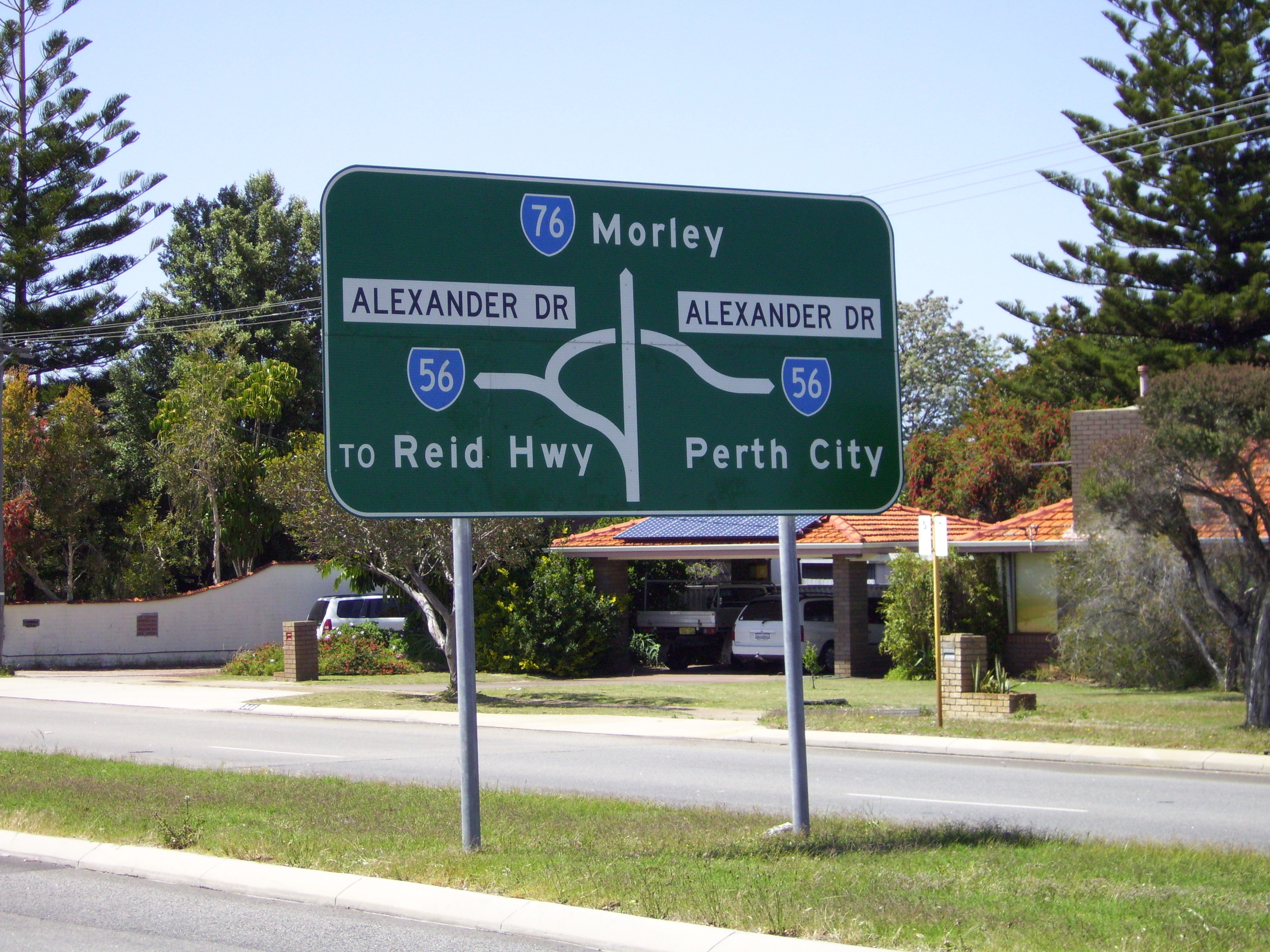
Directions sign on the western approach to the hamburger roundabout

Morley Drive is a major east–west road in the inner northern suburbs of Perth, Western Australia, connecting the residential areas of Balcatta, Osborne Park, Tuart Hill, Westminster, Nollamara, Yokine, Dianella, and Morley with major north-south arterial roads including Wanneroo Road, Alexander Drive, and Tonkin Highway.

== Route description ==
The road is part of State Route 76, which connects the coastal suburb of Trigg, Western Australia, with the Swan Valley in the east. Morley Drive runs through the following local government areas City of Stirling, City of Bayswater and City of Swan. The entire road is controlled by Main Roads Western Australia for its entire length, and is designated as part of the Karrinyup-Morley Highway (H28).

Morley Drive commences at a traffic light intersection with Main Street on the boundary of Balcatta and Tuart Hill, with Morley Drive continuing from Karrinyup Road west of the intersection. 900 metres (3,000 ft) further east, Morley Drive meets Wanneroo Road and then travels along the suburbs of Nollamara and Yokine for 1.1 kilometres (0.68 mi) before intersecting with Flinders Street. The road is now within the suburb of Dianella, travelling through said suburb for 5.8 kilometres (3.6 mi), intersecting with Dianella Drive, Grand Promenade, Alexander Drive and The Strand. The former two intersections are standard traffic light T-junctions, while the intersection with Alexander Drive and The Strand (north-west and south-east) is designed as a hamburger roundabout.

At Camboon and Wellington Roads, Morley Drive heads over into the City of Bayswater and the suburb of Morley. The roads runs through the suburb for 2.8 kilometres (1.7 mi), intersecting with McGilvray Avenue and Crimea Street, before ending at a roundabout interchange at Tonkin Highway. Morley Drive, and State Route 76, continue as Morley Drive East to Caversham and the Swan Valley.

== History ==
Morley Drive was first built during the 1970s to service the then-new inner northern suburbs of Perth. Before then, North Beach Drive was the main route to the coast in the west, as well as some similar situations in Morley, with Morley Drive being mostly discontinuous. Upon the opening of the road, which made the whole road continuous, the existing roads that were affected were made into discontinuous local roads. Also of note was Grand Promenade being cut off from what is known today as Dianella Drive. During the late 1980s, the six-way roundabout with Alexander Drive and the Strand was converted into a hamburger roundabout, resulting in The Strand becoming discontinuous. Morley Drive represented the northern terminus of the section of Tonkin Highway north of the Swan River from 1984 until 1989, when it was extended further north to Benara Road (Tonkin Highway became continuous in 1988).

Apart from minor modifications, Morley Drive remained relatively unchanged until 2010, when the terrain of the eastbound carriageway near McGilvray Avenue was lowered to improve road safety around that area. 2016, the Flinders Street intersection was upgraded with longer turning lanes and better pedestrian facilities. Between 2016 and 2018, as part of the NorthLink WA road project, the intersection with Tonkin Highway was upgraded to a roundabout interchange with Tonkin Highway free-flowing over Morley Drive, a first in WA.

== Videos ==
Views along Morley Drive

Tonkin Highway to Crimea Street

Westbound in Morley, approaching Camboon Road

At the Alexander Drive hamburger roundabout, a "right turn" is made by turning left, then following the roundabout curve to the right

== Major intersections ==
LGA	Location	km	mi	Destinations	Notes
Stirling	Balcatta, Tuart Hill	0	0.0	Main Street – Balcatta, Osborne Park	Morley Drive western terminus: continues as Karrinyup Road (State Route 76)
Stirling	Balcatta, Nollamara, Yokine, Tuart Hill	0.9	0.56	Wanneroo Road (State Route 60) – Perth, Wanneroo	
Stirling	Nollamara, Yokine	2.0	1.2	Flinders Street – Nollamara, Yokine	
Stirling	Dianella	3.2	2.0	Dianella Drive north – Dianella, Mirrabooka	Traffic light controlled T Junction
Stirling	Dianella	33	21	Grand Promenade (State Route 55) southeast – Dianella, Bedford, Bayswater	Traffic light controlled T Junction
Stirling	Dianella	4.1– 4.2	2.5– 2.6	Alexander Drive (State Route 56) north & south / The Strand northwest & southeast – Perth, Malaga, Dianella, Bedford	Hamburger roundabout: Morley Drive continues through roundabout
Stirling, Bayswater	Dianella, Morley	5.8	3.6	Camboon Road north / Wellington Road southeast – Dianella, Morley, Noranda	
Bayswater	Morley	7.3	4.5	Crimea Street – Morley, Noranda	
Bayswater	Morley	8.6	5.3	Tonkin Highway (State Route 4) – Joondalup, Midland, Armadale, Perth Airport	Morley Drive eastern terminus: continues as Morley Drive East (State Route 76). Roundabout interchange favouring Tonkin Highway.
1.000 mi = 1.609 km; 1.000 km = 0.621 mi Note: Intersections with minor local roads are not shown
