= Tom Snooks =

Thomas James Snooks (1890–1958) was a pioneering picture-show man and a developer-builder in the north-eastern suburbs of Perth, Western Australia. In addition to his professional interest in cabinet-making and building, Tom possessed a love for live theatre, staging a number of Gilbert and Sullivan productions in the (now defunct) Maylands Methodist hall, when he was in his early twenties. Not long after the First World War he began showing silent films at a number of venues in Maylands - at the Maylands town hall and the old Lyric Theatre - as well as in Bassendean, and Inglewood, under the business name Central Pictures. By staggering the starting times, Tom and his brothers were able to shuffle canisters of film between competing venues via a speeding motor cycle, thereby keeping the local police force on its toes. In the early days, Tom would go on stage to introduce the silent films, as he believed in the power of the word as well as the image.

Tom was born in Hawthorn, Victoria in 1890, and, when he was six or seven, migrated with his family to gold-booming Perth in order to escape financially depressed Melbourne. He attended state school in Subiaco, Western Australia in the late 1890s and early 1900s, after which the family moved to a hill-top property in Maylands. This rambling timber-clad house became the family headquarters of the extended Snooks clan until the 1970s. The expertise for both of Tom's business activities arose from his early training. When he began an apprenticeship in cabinet making he not only learnt woodworking skills but also imbibed his teacher's love of Shakespeare and the Romantic poets. It was Shakespeare who stimulated his lifelong interest in the performing arts. Tom, who prided himself on being a self-made man, had little time for formal education. He died prematurely in Inglewood in 1958 from a heart damaged by scarlet fever contracted in his youth.

Tom involved his entire family of four brothers (Jack, Ted, Harry, and Mick) and three sisters (Dorrie, Min, and Alice) in his expanding picture show business. The Snooks brothers enthusiastically took part in racing film canisters between cinemas, operating the film projectors (at the Civic Theatre, the centre of the business, the projector was on a swivel mount so that it could show films in either the theatre or the picture gardens), showing people to their seats, and "chucking out" troublesome patrons. The girls dispensed tickets, arranged refreshments, and looked after the accounts. From the 1940s to the early 1960s, the Snooks family continued to own the Civic property, but leased the film-showing business to Goldfields Pictures.

Tom Snooks was actively involved with the Civic Theatre site in Inglewood, Western Australia from the early 1920s until his death in 1958. It was in the early 1920s that Tom built the Piccadilly Picture Gardens, which was one of the first outdoor film-showing venues in the inner north-eastern suburbs. It was a structure that fascinated the local children, as it was built to resemble a castle, clad in appropriately painted corrugated iron. Owing to the success of this venture he reshaped the entire site in the early 1930s, building an indoor cinema with an adjoining picture gardens - now rechristened the Civic Theatre - together with a series of shops providing second-storey accommodation and two blocks of flats. He was the designer, builder, and owner of this prominent complex that occupies the corner of Beaufort Street and Dundas Road. Tom chose the name Civic because, like the clock tower that looked both ways along this arterial road, it looks the same from both directions. Being a thrifty man, the earlier name Piccadilly was reused for the new flats. This heritage-listed complex of buildings was redeveloped for residential purposes - owing to the demise of suburban cinemas in the face of television - between 2006 and 2008. The Janus-like clock tower, however, remains as a major local landmark.

== Construction industry ==
While the picture-show business absorbed a great deal of Tom's time at nights and weekends, it was not his main business. In his day job, Tom was partner and, after the early retirement of his father Thomas George Snooks (1860–1937), principal of T. Snooks & Son, a successful building firm, which had its offices in the second-storey rooms under the clock tower. At least one of Tom's grandsons - the historical economist and complex systems theorist Graeme Snooks - regularly delighted in climbing to the top of the tower to look out over the entire district, while his father (William Donald Snooks, 1920–1966) was otherwise occupied with the firm's accounts. T. Snooks & Son was responsible for building many houses and small businesses in the Maylands-Inglewood area and beyond. Until Tom retired in 1945, due to ill health, all the boys, together with their sister Min (in accounts), worked in his firm; thereafter they established their own building business called Snooks Bros, which continued operating until the mid-1960s. Tom Snooks, therefore, played a significant role in both building and entertaining this microcosm of interwar suburbia.
