= Grand Promenade (Perth) =

Coordinates: 31°54′26″S 115°53′00″E

Grand Promenade Western Australia
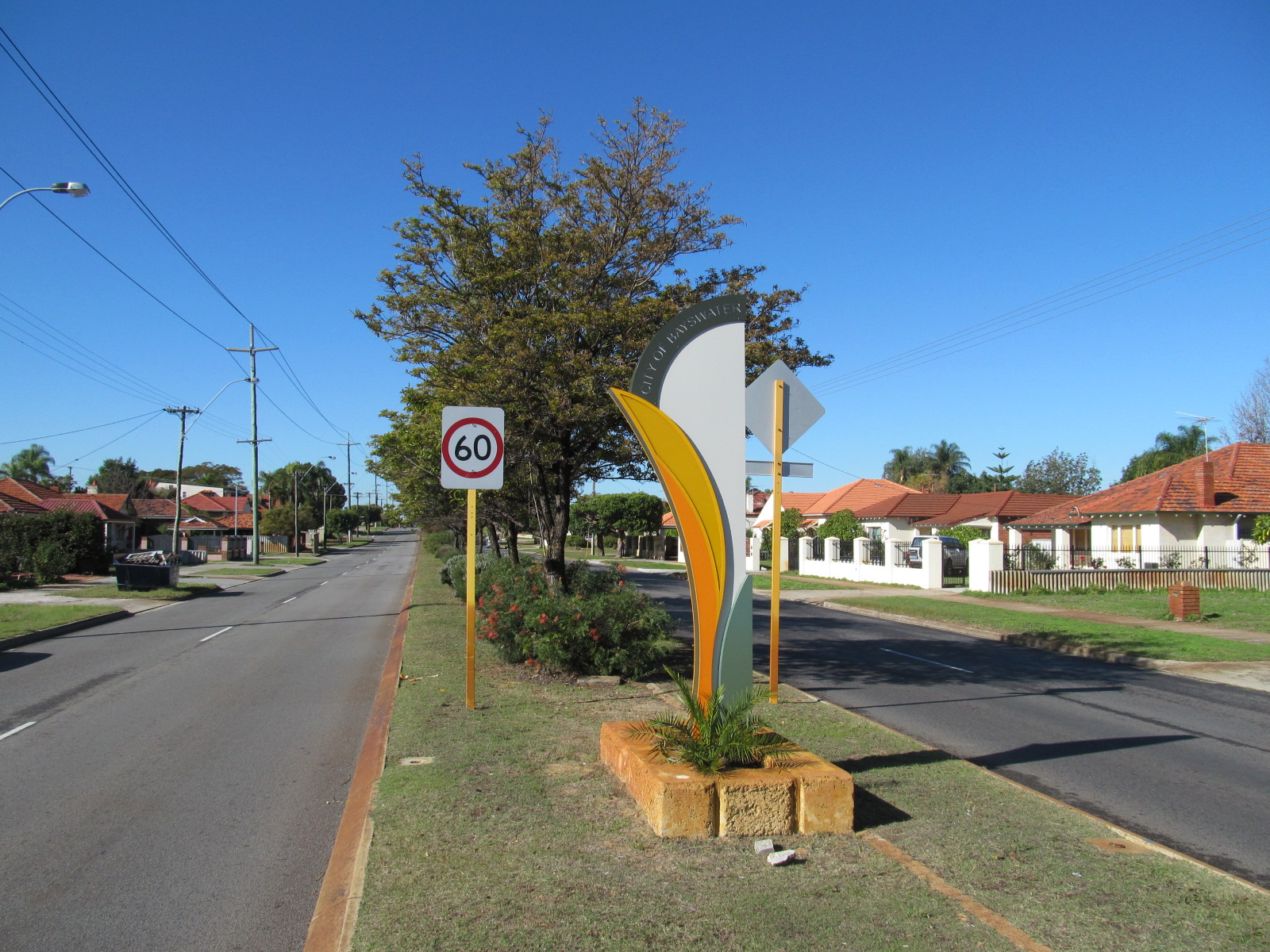
- Grand Promenade entering the City of Bayswater

General information
- Type: Road
- Length: 5.0 km (3.1 mi)
- Route number(s): State Route 55

Major junctions
- North end: Morley Drive (State Route 76), Dianella
- Alexander Drive (State Route 56); Walter Road; Beaufort Street (State Route 53)
- South end: Railway Parade Bayswater

Location(s)
- LGA(s): City of Stirling, City of Bayswater
- Major suburbs: Dianella, Bedford, Bayswater

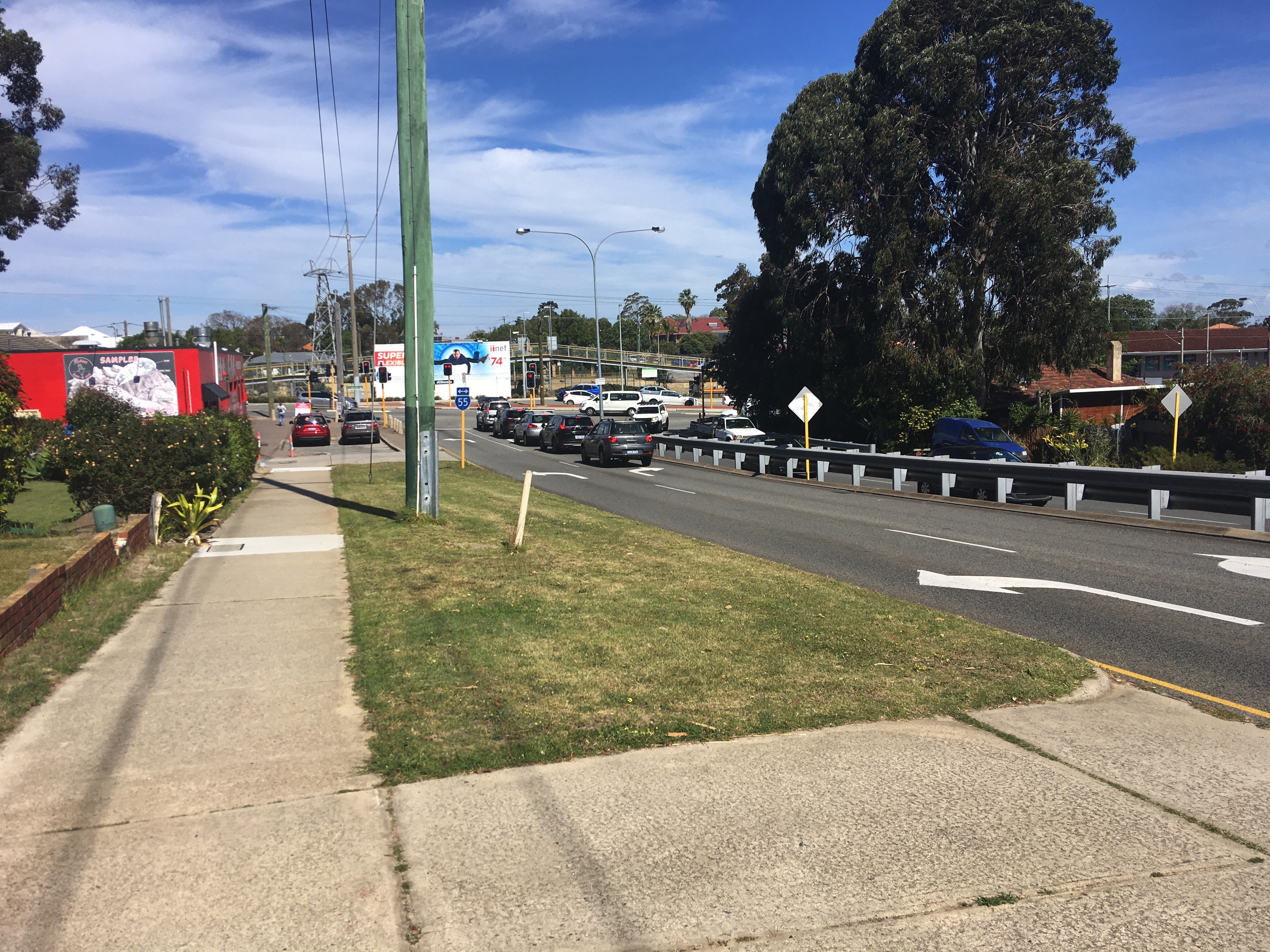
Southern terminus of Grand Promenade

Grand Promenade is a 5-kilometre main road in the inner north-eastern suburbs of Perth, Western Australia, linking Dianella in the north, with Bayswater in the south. It forms the northern section of State Route 55 connecting with Railway Parade, which it joins onto at its southern terminus.

== Route description ==
Grand Promenade is part of state route 55 for its entire length. It commences at Morley Drive, in Dianella, traveling south in a straight line through residential areas before terminating at Railway Parade in Bayswater. It is managed by the City of Stirling from the northern terminus to Walter Road, and the City of Bayswater from Walter Road to the southern terminus. It is a four-lane dual carriageway with a speed limit of 60 km/h for its entire length.

Grand Promenade starts at a traffic light controlled T-intersection with Morley Drive. From there, it bends a little to the east, then continues on straight, traveling through residential areas. After 0.8 kilometres (0.50 mi), it comes to a traffic light controlled intersection with Alexander Drive. Just after there, Grand Promenade passes Dianella Plaza Shopping Centre. After 1.7 kilometres (1.1 mi), Grand Promenade crosses over into Bedford, in the City of Bayswater, at Walter Road. After another 1.5 kilometres (0.93 mi), Grand Promenade intersects Beaufort Street at a traffic light controlled intersection. Soon after, at York Street, it crosses over into Bayswater, then, after 1.0 kilometre (0.62 mi), Grand Promenade terminates at a traffic light controlled T-intersection with Railway Parade, near a small commercial area, and Meltham railway station.

== History ==
Grand Promenade was originally built as a two lane single carriageway which was continuous with Dianella Drive on its northern end. In August 1959, a trolleybus line opened along Grand Promenade as a spur from Beaufort Street to Woodrow Avenue. On 20 December 1968, the trolleybus line closed. In the 1970s, the continuity with Dianella Drive was cut off. In the late 1980s, the road was upgraded to a four lane road from the southern terminus to Alexander Drive. In the late 1990s, the road was upgraded to a four lane road from Alexander Drive to its northern terminus, resulting on the entire road being a four lane road. In addition, the intersection with Alexander Drive was upgraded with turning lanes.

== Future ==
Grand Promenade's south end carries approximately 17,500 vehicles per day, significantly below its capacity of 40,000. A transport assessment recommended that the intersection of Grand Promenade and Bowden Street to be converted to a single-lane roundabout, and Grand Promenade south from there be converted to a single lane road with parking on the side.

== Junction list ==
LGA	Location	km	mi	Destinations	Notes
Stirling	Dianella	0.0	0.0	Morley Drive (State Route 76) – Morley, Karrinyup	Grand Promenade northern terminus; state route 55 northern terminus; Traffic light controlled t-junction
Stirling	Dianella	0.9	0.56	Alexander Drive (State Route 56) – Perth, Malaga, Landsdale	Traffic light controlled intersection
Stirling	Dianella	1.7	1.1	Woodrow Avenue – Yokine	Traffic light controlled t-junction
Stirling–Bayswater boundary	Dianella–Bedford boundary	2.6	1.6	Walter Road – Inglewood, Morley	Traffic light controlled intersection
Bayswater	Bedford	4.0	2.5	Beaufort Street – Perth, Mount Lawley, Morley	Traffic light controlled intersection
Bayswater	Bayswater	5.0	3.1	Railway Parade – Maylands, Bayswater	Traffic light controlled t-junction
