= Dianella Secondary College =

High school in Perth, Western Australia,

Location
- 180 Nollamara Avenue; Dianella, Western Australia; Australia; 31°52′41″S 115°51′11″E

Information
- Type: Public co-educational high day school
- Established: 1965; 61 years ago
- Principal: Debra Unwin
- Enrolment: 558 (2021)
- Campus type: Suburban
- Website: www.dsc.wa.edu.au

Dianella Secondary College (formerly Mirrabooka Senior High School) is a public co-educational high day school, located in Dianella in the northern suburbs of Perth, Western Australia. It teaches years 7 to 12 in the Australian education system, and has around 600 students.

Mirrabooka Senior High School opened in 1965. In 2017 it changed its name to Dianella Secondary College.

The school also has an Education Support Centre for those with disabilities and other children that needs support.

== Notable alumni ==
- Dean Smith, Senator

== See also ==
- List of schools in the Perth metropolitan area
