= Embleton, Western Australia =

Embleton
- Suburb
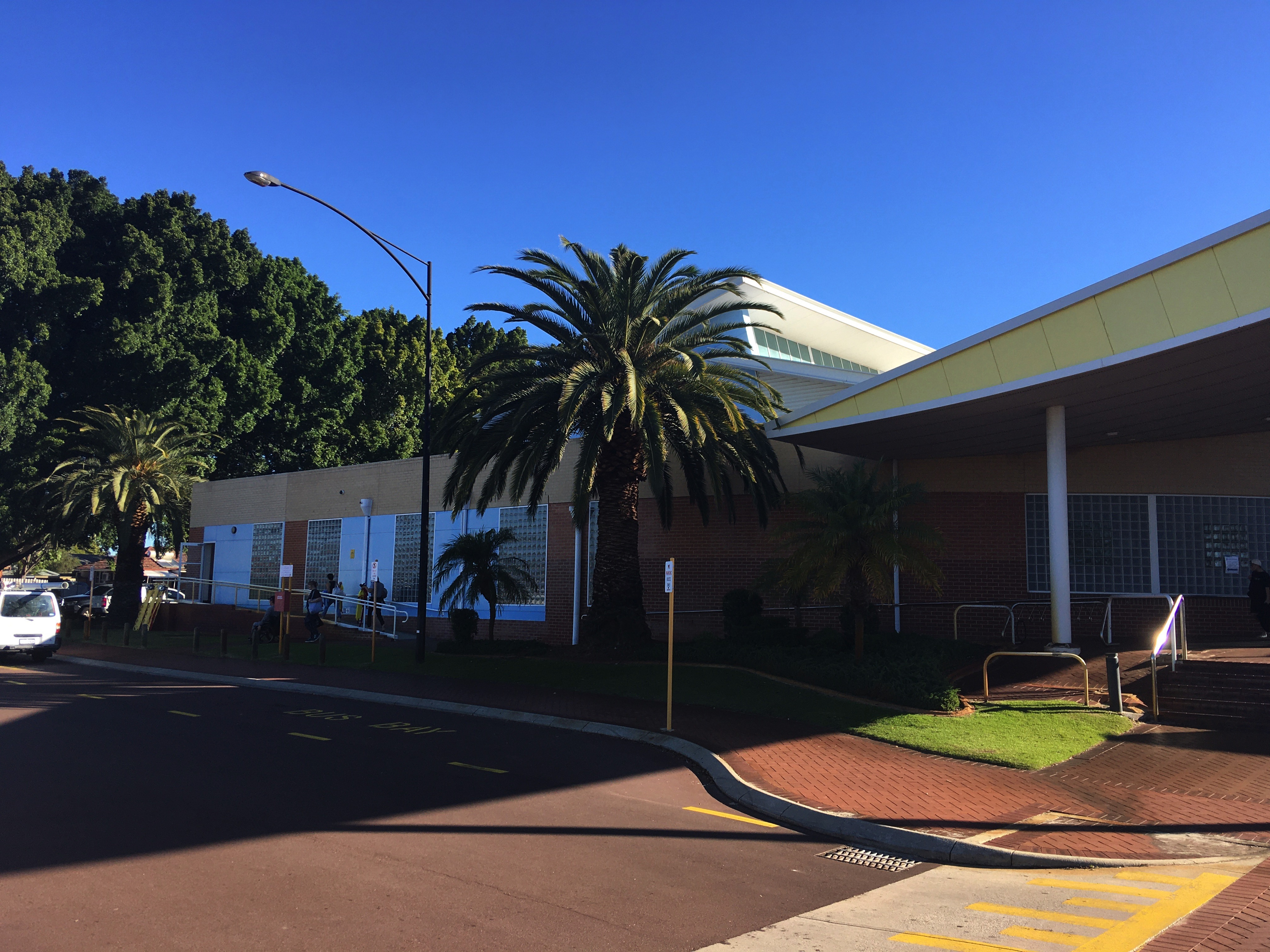
- Bayswater Waves aquatic centre in Embleton
- Interactive map of Embleton
- Coordinates: 31.904°S 115.910°E
- Country: Australia
- State: Western Australia
- City: Perth
- LGA: City of Bayswater
- Location: 7 km (4.3 mi) from the Perth CBD

Government
  - State electorate: Maylands, Bassendean
  - Federal division: Perth

Area
  - Total: 1.71 km^{2} (0.66 sq mi)

Population
  - Total: 3,600 (SAL 2021)
- Postcode: 6062
Suburbs around Embleton
Morley	Morley	Morley
Morley	Embleton	Bayswater
Bedford	Bayswater	Bayswater

Embleton is a suburb of Perth, the capital city of Western Australia, located 7 kilometres (4.3 mi) north-east of the central business district, between the suburbs of Morley and Bayswater. Its local government area is the City of Bayswater.

== History ==
=== Before European colonisation ===
Prior to European settlement, the area was inhabited by the Mooro group of the Whadjuk people of the Noongar nation. The Mooro group were led by Yellagonga, and inhabited the area north of the Swan River, as far east as Ellen Brook and north to Moore River. The Swan River provided fresh water and food, as well as being a place for trade.

=== European colonisation ===
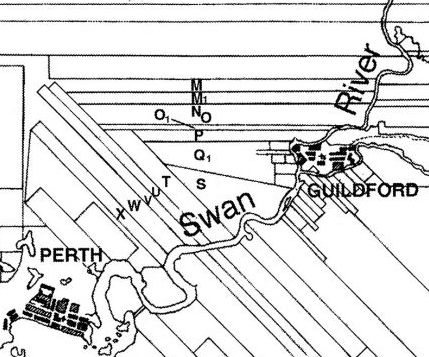
Ribbon grants near the Swan River

When Europeans founded the Swan River Colony in 1829, the land along the Swan River was surveyed by John Septimus Roe, the colony's Surveyor General. The survey resulted in the land being divided into long, narrow rectangular strips extending from the river. As the river was the only method of transportation in the early years of the colony, each piece of land had to have river frontage. The long, narrow strips were called "ribbon grants", however the term "grant" was misleading, as the grantees had a requirement that they make improvements to the land granted to them within 10 years, or be forced to forfeit the land. In 1830, the colonists travelled up the river to the land allotted to them. The colonists were disappointed to discover that most of the area inland was unsuitable for European agriculture, being sand dunes interspersed with swampland. Most of these colonists either died or left the area soon after, and none of them settled in the present day Embleton, far away from the Swan River.

One example of these early colonists is the family of John and Anne Whatley, their children Joan and Mary, and their servants, the Embleton family, who lived at Location T. They arrived in Fremantle in October 1829, and settled on the land in February 1830, but left soon after in September 1830 when John Whatley drowned. The servants, the Embleton family, stayed in the Swan River Colony, and their legacy lives on today as the name of the suburb Embleton.

=== 20th century development ===
In the early 1970s, a site on Broun Avenue was chosen for an aquatic centre to be built and run by the Shire of Bayswater. Construction on the $500,000 project began in February 1972. The facility is now known as Bayswater Waves.

In the early 1980s, Tonkin Highway was under construction through the suburb. The highway meant that Beechboro Road was split into Beechboro Road South and Beechboro Road North, a bridge over Tonkin Highway being built for Broun Avenue instead of Beechboro Road, with Beechboro Road South ending up on the west of Tonkin Highway and Beechboro Road North on its east. Tonkin Highway opened to traffic in 1984.

== Geography ==
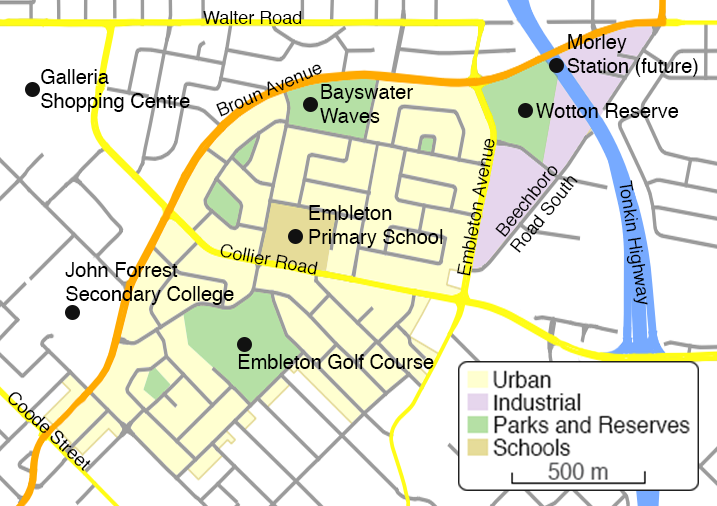
Map of Embleton

Embleton is located approximately 7 kilometres (4.3 mi) north-east of the central business district of Perth, the capital of Western Australia, 15 kilometres (9.3 mi) east of the Indian Ocean, and covers an area of 1.71 square kilometres (0.66 sq mi). It is surrounded by Bayswater to the south and east, Bedford to the west and Morley to the north. Its border roughly follows, heading anti-clockwise, Broun Avenue, Coode Street, Beaufort Street, Drake Street, Rothbury Road. Maurice Street, Langley Road and Beechboro Road.

Embleton is predominantly zoned as "urban" in the Metropolitan Region Scheme, however the area between Embleton Avenue and Tonkin Highway is zoned as "industrial".

Embleton lies on the Bassendean Dunes, which formed 800,000 to 125,000 years ago during the middle Pleistocene. The dunes form low-lying hills made of heavily leached white to grey sands, which are poor at retaining nutrients. Groundwater is generally about 10 metres (33 ft) below the surface. The Bassendean Dunes are a part of the greater Swan Coastal Plain.

== Demographics ==
Embleton's population at the 2016 census was 3,167. This is an increase on the 2,737 recorded at the 2011 census, 2,434 recorded at the 2006 census, and 2,404 recorded at the 2001 census. 49.6% of residents are male and 50.4% are female. The median age is 37 years, just above the Western Australian average of 36. Out of the suburb's 1,309 dwellings, 1,140 were occupied and 169 were unoccupied. Out of the occupied dwellings, 996 were detached houses, 129 were semi-detached, 3 were apartments or flats and 3 were another type. 288 were owned outright, 436 were owned with a mortgage, 379 were rented and 35 were another type or not stated.

The median weekly household income was $1,542, which is close to the median weekly household income of Western Australia, which is $1,595. Major industries that residents worked in were cafes and restaurants (3.5%), hospitals (3.5%), state government administration (2.4%), other social assistance services (2.0%) and primary education (2.0%).

The population of Embleton is predominantly Australian born, with 53.2% of residents born in Australia. The next-most-common birthplaces are England (5.6%), Vietnam (3.6%), Philippines (3.0%), China (2.9%) and New Zealand (2.5%). 28.4% of residents had both parent born in Australia, and 51.0% had neither parents born in Australia.

== Parks and amenities ==
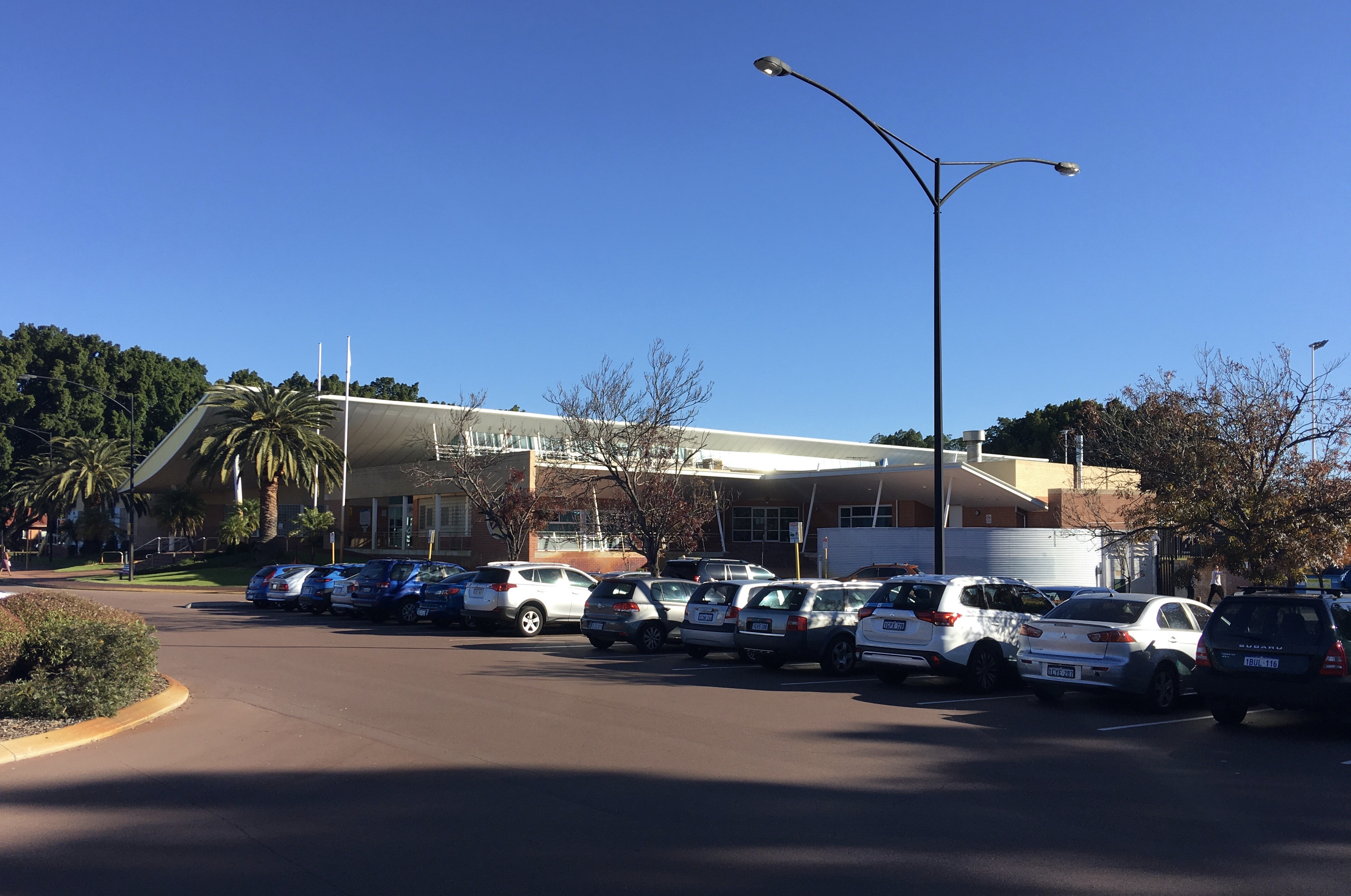
Bayswater Waves

Located in Embleton is Bayswater Waves, the City of Bayswater's aquatic centre. It has several indoor and outdoor pools, including Western Australia's only wave pool. It also has a crèche, health club, and hydrotherapy area. Next to Bayswater Waves is Broun Park. Embleton Golf Course is a 9-hole golf course owned by the City of Bayswater and operated by Golf Oracle. Wotton Reserve is on the corner of Embleton Avenue and Broun Avenue. It has several soccer pitches and a skate park.

Other minor parks are spread throughout the suburb, including Feredy Reserve, McKenzie Reserve and Ockley Square Reserve. The portion of Embleton used as public open space is less than the 10% recommended by the state government's liveable neighbourhoods policy.

== Education ==
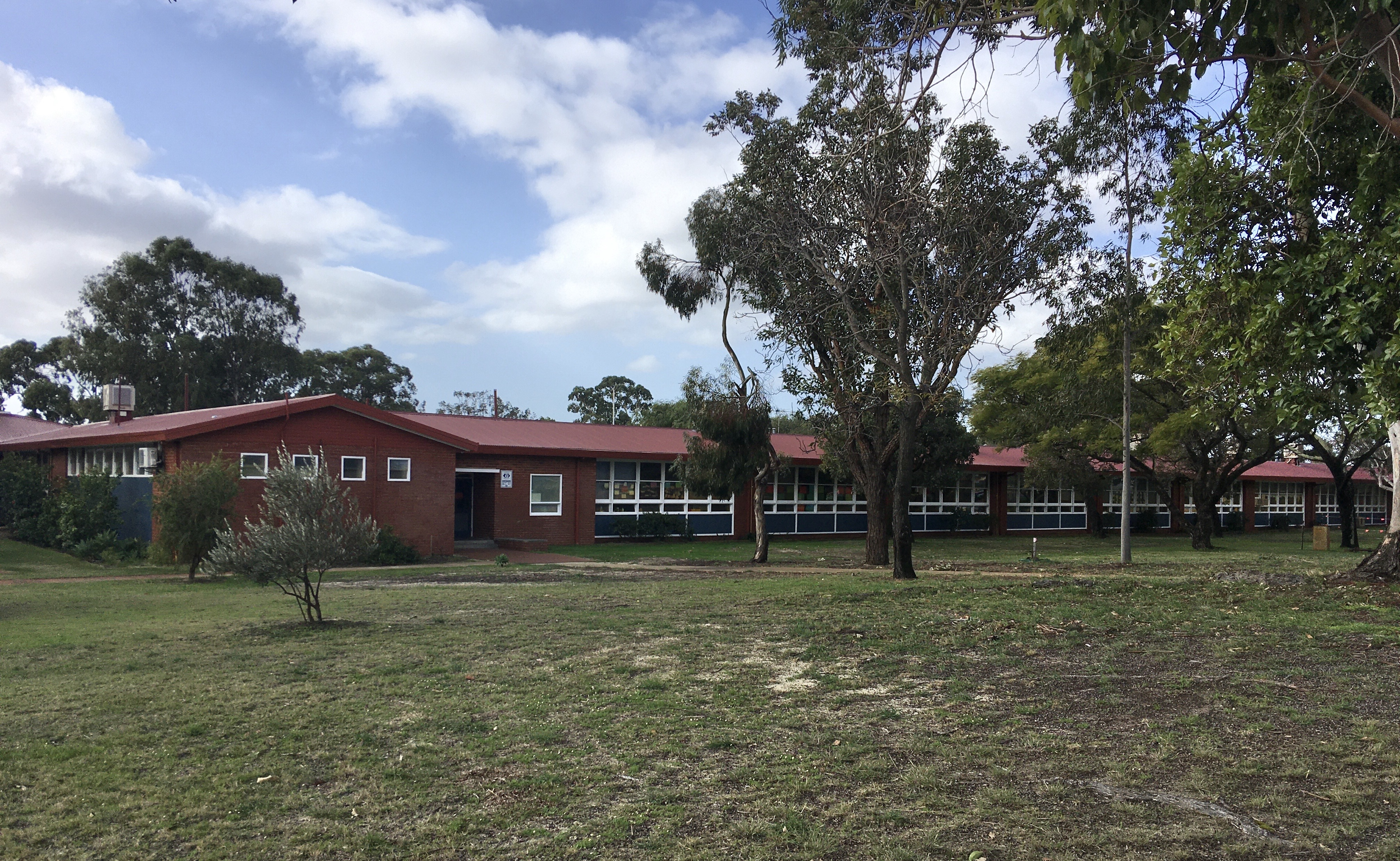
Embleton Primary School

The sole school located in Embleton is Embleton Primary School, a public primary school for students from Kindergarten to Year 6. Hillcrest Primary School and John Forrest Secondary College are located adjacent to the suburb's western boundary.

== Governance ==
=== Local ===
Embleton is in the City of Bayswater local government area. It is almost entirely within its central ward, but there is a small portion in its west ward. Councillors for the central ward are Barry McKenna, Sally Palmer and Steven Ostaszewskyj. Councillors for the west ward are Lorna Clarke, Giorgia Johnson and Dan Bull, who is also the mayor.

=== State ===
Embleton west of Tonkin Highway is within the Electoral district of Maylands, and east of Tonkin Highway is within the Electoral district of Bassendean for the Western Australian Legislative Assembly. Both of these districts are strong seats for the centre-left Labor Party. Labor has held Maylands since 1968 and Bassendean since it was created in 1996. Maylands' current member is Lisa Baker, and Bassendean's current member is Dave Kelly. In the Western Australian Legislative Council, both these districts are part of the East Metropolitan electoral region.

=== Federal ===
Bayswater is within the Division of Perth in the Australian Federal Government. It is a safe seat for the Australian Labor Party, and has been held by a Labor member since 1983. Its current member is Patrick Gorman.

== Transport ==
At the 2016 census, 70.0% of residents travelled to work in a car, whether it be as a passenger or a driver, and 7.2% took public transport.

=== Road ===
Major roads that pass through Embleton include Beechboro Road, Broun Avenue, Collier Road, Embleton Avenue and Tonkin Highway. Tonkin Highway can be accessed by an interchange with Collier Road in Bayswater. Broun Avenue bridges over Tonkin Highway but does not have any connecting ramps.

=== Public transport ===
Embleton is served by Transperth routes 48, 66, 341, 342, 345, 950 and 955. When the under-construction Ellenbrook line opens in 2024, Embleton will be served by Morley railway station, located at the Broun Avenue flyover at Tonkin Highway.

==== Bus ====
- 40 Galleria Bus Station to Elizabeth Quay Bus Station – serves Broadway, Irwin Road, Collier Road, Power Street and Langley Road
- 46 Morley Station to Bayswater Station – serves Embleton Avenue and Beechboro Road
- 47 Morley Station to Bassendean Station – serves Embleton Avenue and Beechboro Road
- 352 Morley Station to Galleria Bus Station – only serves Morley Station
- 355 Galleria Bus Station to Whiteman Park Station – serves Broun Avenue and Collier Road
- 950X Morley Station to Queen Elizabeth II Medical Centre (high frequency / limited stops) – only serves Morley Station
- 975 Bayswater Station to Warwick Station (high frequency) – serves Beechboro Road, Collier Road and Broun Avenue

Bus routes serving Broun Avenue and Morley Station:

- 353, 354 and 356 Galleria Bus Station to Ballajura Station
- 950 Morley Station to Queen Elizabeth II Medical Centre (high frequency)

==== Rail ====
- Ellenbrook Line
  - Morley Station
