= Dianella, Western Australia =

Suburb of Perth, Australia

Dianella
- Suburb
- Interactive map of Dianella
- Coordinates: 31.888°S 115.874°E
- Country: Australia
- State: Western Australia
- City: Perth
- LGAs: City of Bayswater; City of Stirling
- Location: 9 km (5.6 mi) from the Perth CBD
- Established: 1960s

Government
  - State electorates: Mirrabooka; Morley; Mount Lawley
  - Federal divisions: Perth; Cowan

Area
  - Total: 10.7 km^{2} (4.1 sq mi)

Population
  - Total: 24,169 (SAL 2021)
- Postcode: 6059
Suburbs around Dianella
Westminster	Mirrabooka	Noranda
Nollamara	Dianella	Morley
Yokine; Menora	Inglewood	Bedford

Dianella is a suburb of Perth, Western Australia. It is within the local government area of the City of Stirling.

== History ==
Dianella was named after the botanical title of a small blue lily, Dianella revoluta, a narrow-leafed plant that was plentiful in the area before residential development. Early development of the area was slow, as the sandy soil, part of the Banksia sandplain, was considered unsuitable for agriculture. Much of Dianella was subdivided in the 1880s by the Intercolonial Investment Company of Sydney, but growth was still slow and by 1919, the only development was along Walter Road, a track leading to dairy farms in the Morley area. Dianella comprised localities known as North Inglewood, East Yokine, Morley Park and Bedford Park. They were amalgamated into Dianella in 1958, which generated some growth.

Development progressed during the 1960s and housing construction first occurred north from Walter Road and Grand Promenade, with St Andrews, Montclair Rise and Dress Circle Estates being the last major areas to be developed in the early 2000s. The character of housing ranges from modest post-war homes to large, modern two storey dwellings.

Dianella was Perth and Western Australia's media centre; with three of Perth's major commercial television stations based there until Channel 7 relocated to Osborne Park in 2015. Channel 9 and Channel 10 left the suburb in 2016 and are now in St Georges Terrace and Subiaco, respectively.

== Facilities ==
Dianella Plaza is the major shopping centre in the suburb, with several smaller local stores. Dianella Plaza opened in 1968 on the corner of Alexander Drive and Grand Promenade. In 2026, plans were announced for a $35 million upgrade of the centre.

There are a number of small parks in Dianella and a large regional open space. Education is provided by a number of primary schools as well as high schools in Mirrabooka and Morley.

Dianella Regional Open Space is at the junction of Alexander Drive and Morley Drive and provides a landscape feature for the suburb as well as sporting facilities. The area is home to a number of sporting codes, including lacrosse, football, little athletics, soccer and cricket as well as many more indoor sports.

== Demography ==
Dianella lies at the heart of Perth's small Jewish community. Although this is the third largest Jewish community in Australia, numbers have never reached more than 6000 members (the most recent Australian census put Western Australia's entire Jewish community at 5,300 members). Dianella itself is home to a number of community institutions such as a Jewish day school (Carmel), a sports club, an aged home (Maurice Zeffert Home) and a small synagogue known as "Dianella Shul". A number of streets in the region are named after Jewish icons such as Menora, Maccabean and Golda Meir. Despite a small but steady stream of Jewish immigration from South Africa and China, specifically Kaifeng, the community in Dianella and surrounding suburbs is shrinking as many young people leave Perth, mainly heading to the larger Australian Jewish communities in Melbourne and Sydney.

Dianella is also part of Perth's small Greek community, the second biggest hub for the Greek Orthodox Community in Perth, the biggest being in the centre of Northbridge. During the early 1990s, the Greek community of Perth wanted a Greek Orthodox College so that children of Greek origin could learn the Greek language and to be engaged in the Greek culture while going to school. Today, there is a Greek day school (St Andrew's Grammar) which is located in the St Andrews Land Estate and a small Greek Orthodox Church (Agios Nectarios) located in the northern sector of the suburb just next to the Dress Circle Land Estate. Next to the Greek Orthodox College there is a Greek retirement home (Hellenic Community Aged Care). Some streets in the northern sector of the suburb have names of Greek origin such as Hellenic Drive in the St Andrews Land Estate.

== Transport ==
=== Bus ===
- 20 Galleria Bus Station to Edith Cowan University Mount Lawley – serves Wellington Road, Morley Drive, Light Street and Alexander Drive
- 67 Mirrabooka Bus Station to Perth Busport – serves Yirrigan Drive, Dianella Drive and Grand Promenade
- 68 Mirrabooka Bus Station to Perth Busport – serves Northwood Drive, Dianella Drive, Oliver Street, The Strand, Rennington Street, Lennard Street and Bedale Street
- 350 Mirrabooka Bus Station to Caversham – serves Northwood Drive, Kokoda Boulevard, Cherrywood Avenue, Hellenic Drive and Widgee Road
- 360 Perth Busport to Alexander Heights Shopping Centre (limited stops) – serves Alexander Drive
- 361 Galleria Bus Station to Alexander Heights Shopping Centre (limited stops) – serves Wellington Road and Widgee Road
- 960 Mirrabooka Bus Station to Curtin University Bus Station (high frequency) – serves Yirrigan Drive, Dianella Drive, Morley Drive and Alexander Drive
- 970 Mirrabooka Bus Station to Perth Busport (high frequency) – serves Mirrabooka Avenue and Nollamara Avenue
- 970X Mirrabooka Bus Station to Perth Busport (high frequency / limited stops) – serves Mirrabooka Avenue and Nollamara Avenue
- 975 Galleria Bus Station to Warwick Station (high frequency) – serves Wellington Road, Alexander Drive and Yirrigan Drive
- 980 Galleria Bus Station to Elizabeth Quay Bus Station (high frequency) – serves Walter Road
- 998 Fremantle Station to Fremantle Station (limited stops) – CircleRoute clockwise, serves Morley Drive, Grand Promenade and Walter Road
- 999 Fremantle Station to Fremantle Station (limited stops) – CircleRoute anti-clockwise, serves Walter Road, Grand Promenade and Morley Drive

Bus routes serving Northwood Drive:

- 362 and 363 Mirrabooka Bus Station to Ballajura Station
- 377 Mirrabooka Bus Station to Alexander Heights Shopping Centre
