= Bedford, Western Australia =

Bedford
- Suburb
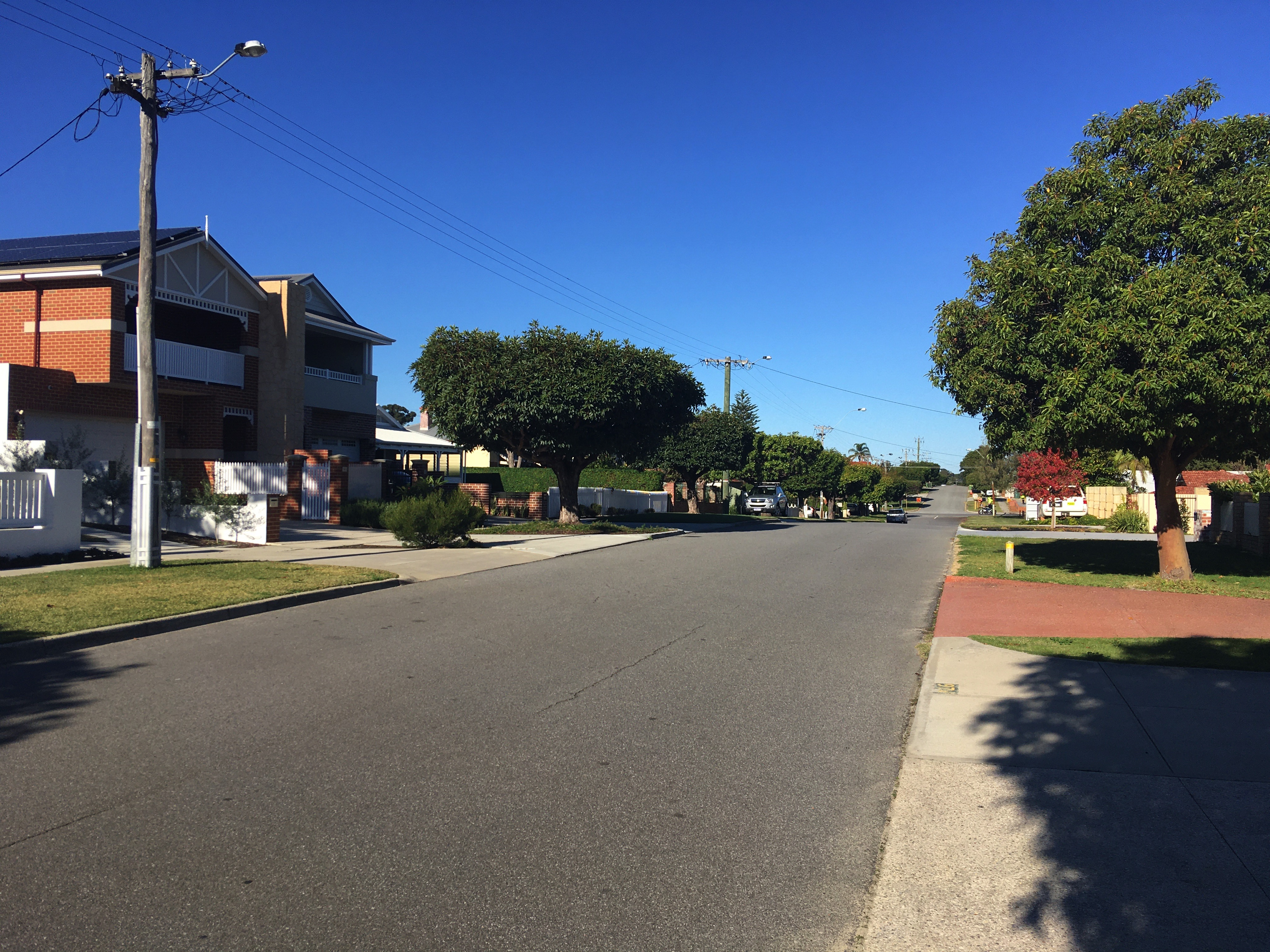
- Rosebery Street near Park Street
- Interactive map of Bedford
- Coordinates: 31°54′32″S 115°53′31″E
- Country: Australia
- State: Western Australia
- City: Perth
- LGA: City of Bayswater
- Location: 6 km (3.7 mi) from Perth
- Established: 1937 (townsite gazetted)

Government
  - State electorate: Maylands
  - Federal division: Perth

Area
  - Total: 2.33 km^{2} (0.90 sq mi)

Population
  - Total: 5,716 (SAL 2021)
- Postcode: 6052
Suburbs around Bedford
Dianella		Morley
	Bedford	Embleton
Inglewood	Maylands	Bayswater

Bedford is a suburb 6 kilometres (4 mi) north-east of the central business district (CBD) of Perth, the capital of Western Australia. Named after Frederick Bedford, the Governor of Western Australia from 1903 to 1909, the suburb is within the City of Bayswater local government area. It is predominantly a low density residential suburb consisting of single-family detached homes, with clusters of commercial buildings along Beaufort Street, Grand Promenade and Walter Road.

Before European settlement, the area was inhabited by the Mooro group of the Whadjuk Noongar people. The first major developments for the suburb occurred in the 1920s, when the extension of Beaufort Street and its associated tram service into the area triggered housing construction. Bedford Park was gazetted as a townsite in 1937, and major growth occurred following World War II, due to developments by the State Housing Commission. Today, Bedford is fully suburbanised.

Major roads that travel through or along the edge of the suburb are Beaufort Street, Coode Street, Grand Promenade and Walter Road. Major parks include Beaufort Park, RA Cook Reserve and Grand Promenade Reserve, which are used for various sports including Australian rules football, cricket and soccer.

== History ==
=== Aboriginal history and culture ===
Before European settlement, the area was inhabited by the Mooro group of the Whadjuk Noongar people. The Mooro group were led by Yellagonga, and inhabited the area north of the Swan River, as far east as Ellen Brook and north to Moore River. The Swan River provided fresh water and food, as well as being a place for trade.

=== European colonisation ===
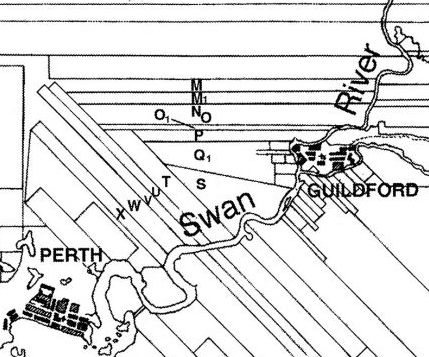
Ribbon grants near the Swan River

When Europeans founded the Swan River Colony in 1829, they did not recognise the indigenous ownership of the land. Land along the Swan River was surveyed by John Septimus Roe, the colony's Surveyor General. The survey resulted in the land being divided into long, narrow rectangular strips extending from the river. As the river was the only method of transportation in the early years of the colony, each piece of land had to have river frontage. The long, narrow strips were called "ribbon grants", however the term "grant" was misleading, as the grantees had a requirement that they make improvements to the land granted to them within 10 years, or be forced to forfeit the land. In 1830, the colonists travelled up the river to the land allotted to them. The colonists were disappointed to discover that most of the area inland was unsuitable for European agriculture, being sand dunes interspersed with swampland. Most of these colonists either died or left the area soon after, and none of them settled in the present day Bedford, far away from the Swan River.

=== 20th century development ===
In the 1920s, Beaufort Street was extended through to Salisbury Street, and then Coode Street. The Beaufort Street tram was extended as far as Salisbury Street. Gold Estates of Australia Pty Ltd, a gold prospecting company that had turned to real estate, bought the land near Beaufort Street that was part of Location W, and subdivided it for residential purposes. This generated the first major development in Bedford Park, which was at the time just an extension of Inglewood into the Bayswater Road District. Some of the houses developed in the 1920s still remain along Rosebery Street and Salisbury Street.

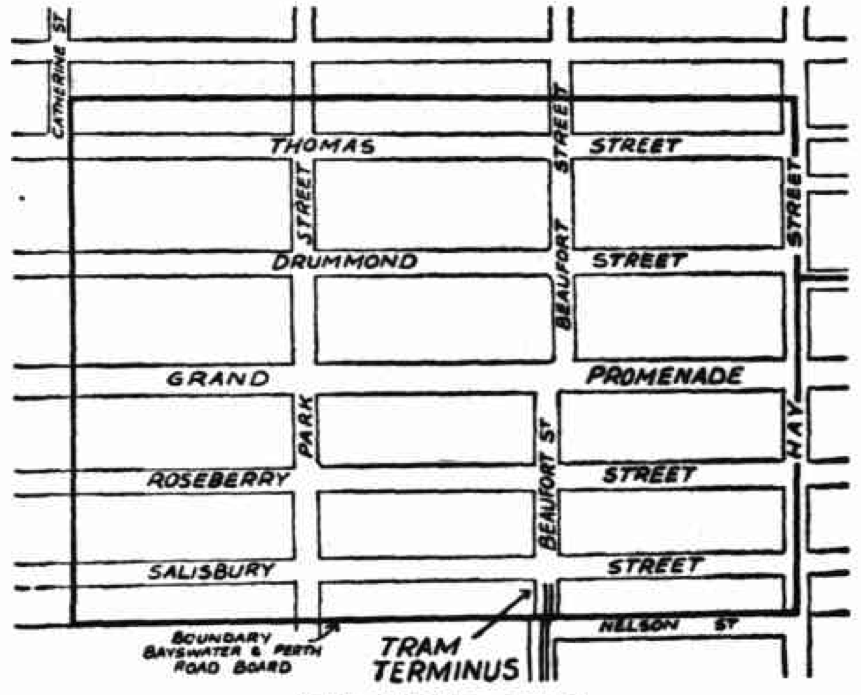
Bedford Park townsite map published in The West Australian on 27 July 1937

On 18 June 1937, the townsite of Bedford Park was gazetted, named after Frederick Bedford, the Governor of Western Australia between 1903 and 1909. It consisted of 53 hectares (130 acres) of land centred on the intersection of Beaufort Street and Grand Promenade. The Beaufort Street tram terminated at Salisbury Street, on the edge of the townsite. During World War II, the tram was extended to Grand Promenade, as one of the final extensions to Perth's tramway system.

Following World War II, there was a severe shortage of housing in Perth. The State Housing Commission bought large areas of land in Bedford. The first public housing estate built in Bedford was between Walter Road and Craven Street. The West Australian commended the housing commission in successfully creating houses that were varied in design:

...(The State Housing Commission has) despite mass development, skilfully avoided any appearance of monotony in design. All the homes are on wide fronted, deep blocks and all are basically the same inside in that they have the same number of rooms and the same facilities. There all similarity ceases. By switching the entrances from one side of the house to the other, or by placing them in the middle, by running gables at different angles and by general architectural modifications, complete dissimilarity has been achieved.

By 1948, the population in the northern side of Bedford Park was large enough for shops to be needed. The State Housing Commission was initially unsure of whether its job was to provide shops or whether it was appropriate. It was decided that the housing commission did need to build shops, and so the shops along Grand Promenade are the first in Perth to be built using taxpayer money. By May 1952, the shops were completed, and occupied by a bootmaker, butcher, chemist, delicatessen, grocer and draper.

The rapid expansion put strain on the Bayswater Road Board's budget. In 1946, the board told the housing commission that they were unable to build more roads than what was paid in rates, and in 1949, the road board refused to build any more roads in Bedford without additional funding from the government. An agreement was created that the State Housing Commission would pay half the cost of the roads for the area, but even still, that put great strain on the road board's budget.

The expanding population of Bedford Park and its neighbouring suburb of Bayswater necessitated a new primary school in the late 1940s. North Inglewood Primary School was at capacity. The Department of Education foresaw a large protest if a new school was not open by 1950. The site atop a hill on Coode Street, just over the border in Bayswater, was selected in March 1949. The plans called for a school with six to eight classrooms, however works were delayed due to the site's steep nature. Due to the urgency of needing a school open by 1950, three classrooms were transported from East Fremantle to the site. The school opened in 1950 to 120 pupils and criticism of its basic facilities. The school expanded its buildings over the course of the decade, and in 1958, the school's population was approximately 700. The expanding population also caused the Catholic Church to establish St Peter's Primary School on Wood Street, next to its church.

Starting in 1948, Perth's tramways began to gradually shut down, due to the increasing use of private cars crowding roads and reducing patronage. The Beaufort Street tramway was the last to be closed, on 19 July 1958. It was replaced by trolleybuses, which followed the same route but had some extensions and spurs. The line was extended along Beaufort Street to Lawrence Street, opening on 21 July 1958. A spur was opened in August 1959, travelling along Grand Promenade to Woodrow Avenue in Dianella.

In 1961, Bedford Park was renamed Bedford. This change happened alongside the renaming of Morley Park to Morley. On 20 December 1968, the trolleybuses to Bedford were closed. By the early 1970s, major development of Bedford was complete, the last road being Gummery Street in the suburb's north.

=== 21st century ===
==== Harvey family mass murder ====
In September 2018, 24 year-old Anthony Robert Harvey was arrested for the murder of his family of five in a house on Coode Street. Harvey was charged with murdering his three daughters, all under the age of four, his wife, and his mother-in-law. Harvey murdered his children and wife on 3 September 2018. The next morning, he murdered his mother-in-law. Police found that no firearms were used; instead "blunt objects" and knives were used. Harvey's case came before Justice Stephen Hall in the Supreme Court of Western Australia, where he became the first Western Australian in history to be sentenced to life in prison with no option for release. ABC News reported this event to be the "third mass murder" for a domestic household of 2018, claiming that Bedford and metropolitan Perth were in a "domestic violence crisis". The house was demolished in May 2021.

== Geography ==
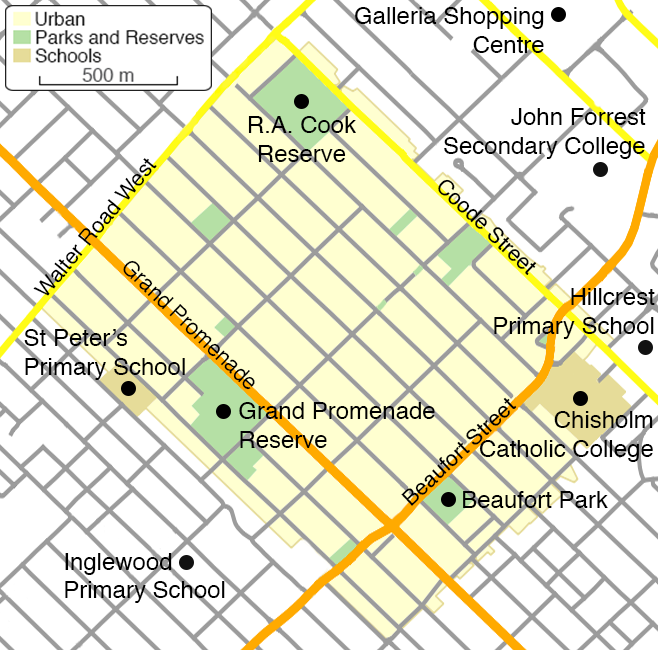
Map of Bedford and surrounding areas

Bedford is located 6 kilometres (4 mi) north-east of the central business district (CBD) of Perth, the capital of Western Australia, 13 kilometres (8 mi) east of the Indian Ocean, and covers an area of 2.33 square kilometres (0.90 sq mi). It is surrounded by Morley to the north-east, Dianella to the north-west, Inglewood to the south-west, Bayswater to the south-east, and Embleton to the east. Its southern corner touches Maylands. Its border follows the centre of Walter Road, the lots on the north-eastern side of Coode Street, the lots on the south-eastern side of York Street and the lots on the south-western side of Salisbury Street.

Bedford is zoned as "urban" in the Metropolitan Region Scheme, and consists predominantly of single-family detached homes, with clusters of commercial buildings along Beaufort Street, Grand Promenade and Walter Road. The streets in the suburb follow a grid pattern, a remnant of the old ribbon grants.

Bedford lies on the Bassendean Dunes, which formed 800,000 to 125,000 years ago during the middle Pleistocene. The dunes form low-lying hills made of heavily leached white to grey sands, which are poor at retaining nutrients. Groundwater is generally about 10 m (33 ft) below the surface. The Bassendean Dunes are a part of the greater Swan Coastal Plain.

== Demographics ==
Bedford's population at the 2016 Australian census was 5,438. This is an increase on the 4,944 recorded at the 2011 census, 4,575 recorded at the 2006 census, and 4,240 recorded at the 2001 census. 48.8% of residents are male and 51.2% are female. The median age is 37 years, just above the Western Australian average of 36. Out of the suburb's 2,224 dwellings, 2,016 were occupied and 208 were unoccupied. Out of the occupied dwellings, 1,749 were detached houses, 257 were semi-detached and 10 were apartments or flats. 564 were owned outright, 791 were owned with a mortgage, 593 were rented and 67 were other or not stated. Bedford's tenure statistics closely aligns with the state averages.

The median weekly household income was $1,779, which is higher than the state and the country, which are at $1,595 and $1,438 respectively. Major industries that residents worked in were hospitals (4.8%), cafes and restaurants (4.0%), state government administration (3.0%), primary education (2.7%) and engineering design and engineering consulting services (2.1%).

The population of Bedford is predominantly Australian born, with 61.2% of residents born in Australia, which is around the state average of 60.3%. The next-most-common birthplaces are England (4.6%), New Zealand (2.4%), India (2.2%), Vietnam (2.2%) and Italy (2.0%). 33.1% of residents had both parents born in Australia, and 44.3% of residents had neither parent born in Australia. The most popular religious affiliations were none (31.3%), Catholic (31.0%), Anglican (9.4%) and Buddhism (2.9%).

== Parks and amenities ==
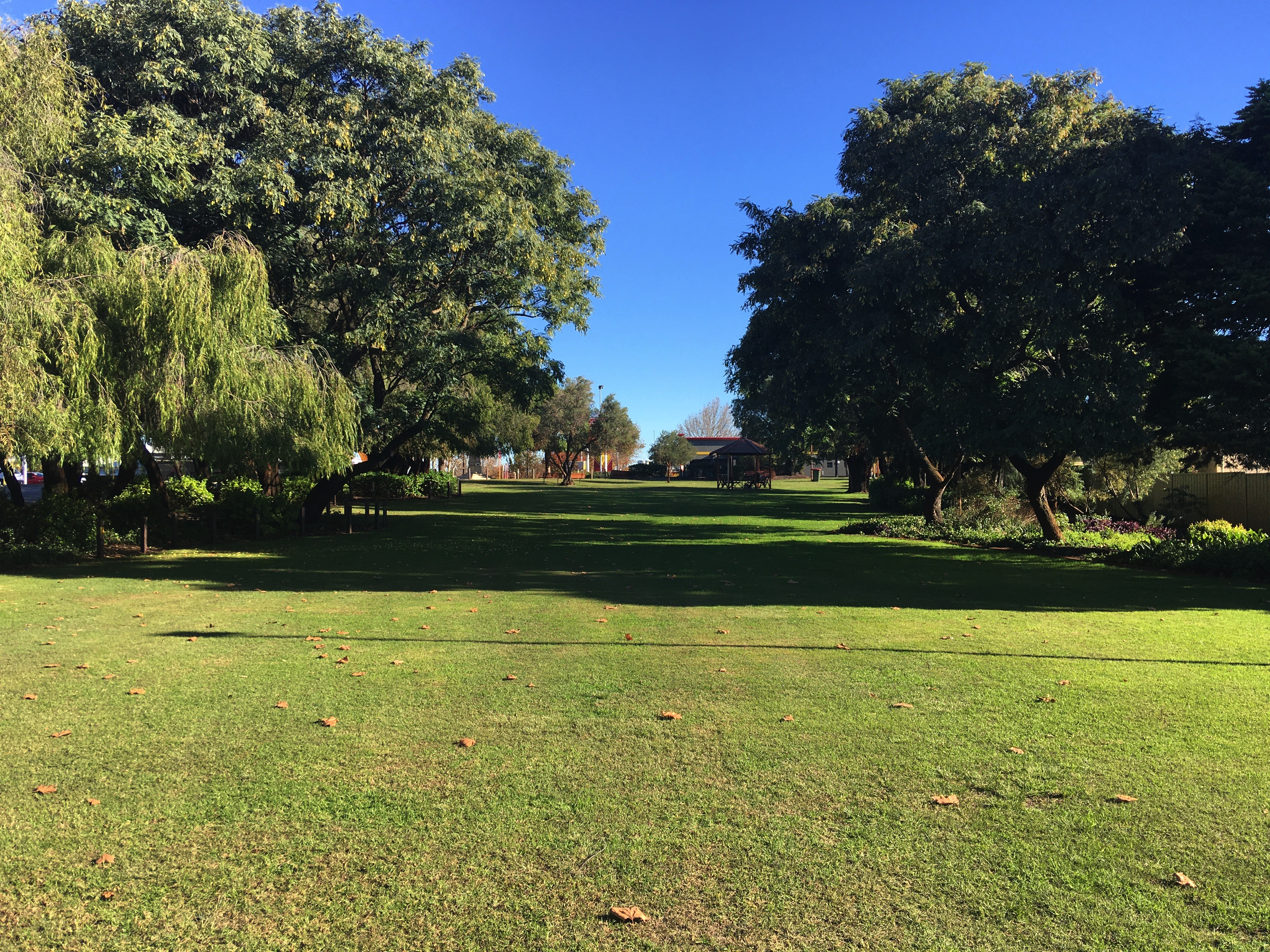
Remembrance Park

Commercial buildings in Bedford are limited to small businesses along the major roads. The nearest supermarket is Inglewood Coles, just to the west of Bedford, and the nearest shopping centres are the Galleria Shopping Centre in Morley and Dianella Plaza.

Beaufort Park is a park on the corner of Drummond and Beaufort Streets, which has a large grassed oval, a playground and a hall open for hire. During the summer, the oval is used for cricket, and has an artificial cricket pitch. In winter, there are two soccer pitches. Grand Promenade Reserve is a park used for various sports. The oval is used for soccer and cricket, using an artificial pitch. The park also has cricket nets, courts for basketball and netball, and a playground. Next to it is a lawn bowls club and a community hall leased to the Filipino Australian Multicultural Association. RA Cook Reserve is a sports reserve on Coode Street, used for cricket, Australian rules football, hurling, and softball. It has a turf pitch and two artificial cricket pitches, as well as cricket nets, and two Australian rules football ovals in winter. It is used by various sports clubs, and has a community hall for hire. Other minor parks are spread throughout the suburb, including Alan Lehmann Reserve, Birkett Street Reserve, Browns Lake Reserve, Gummery Reserve and Remembrance Park. The portion of Bedford used as public open space is less than the 10% recommended by the state government's liveable neighbourhoods policy.

== Education ==
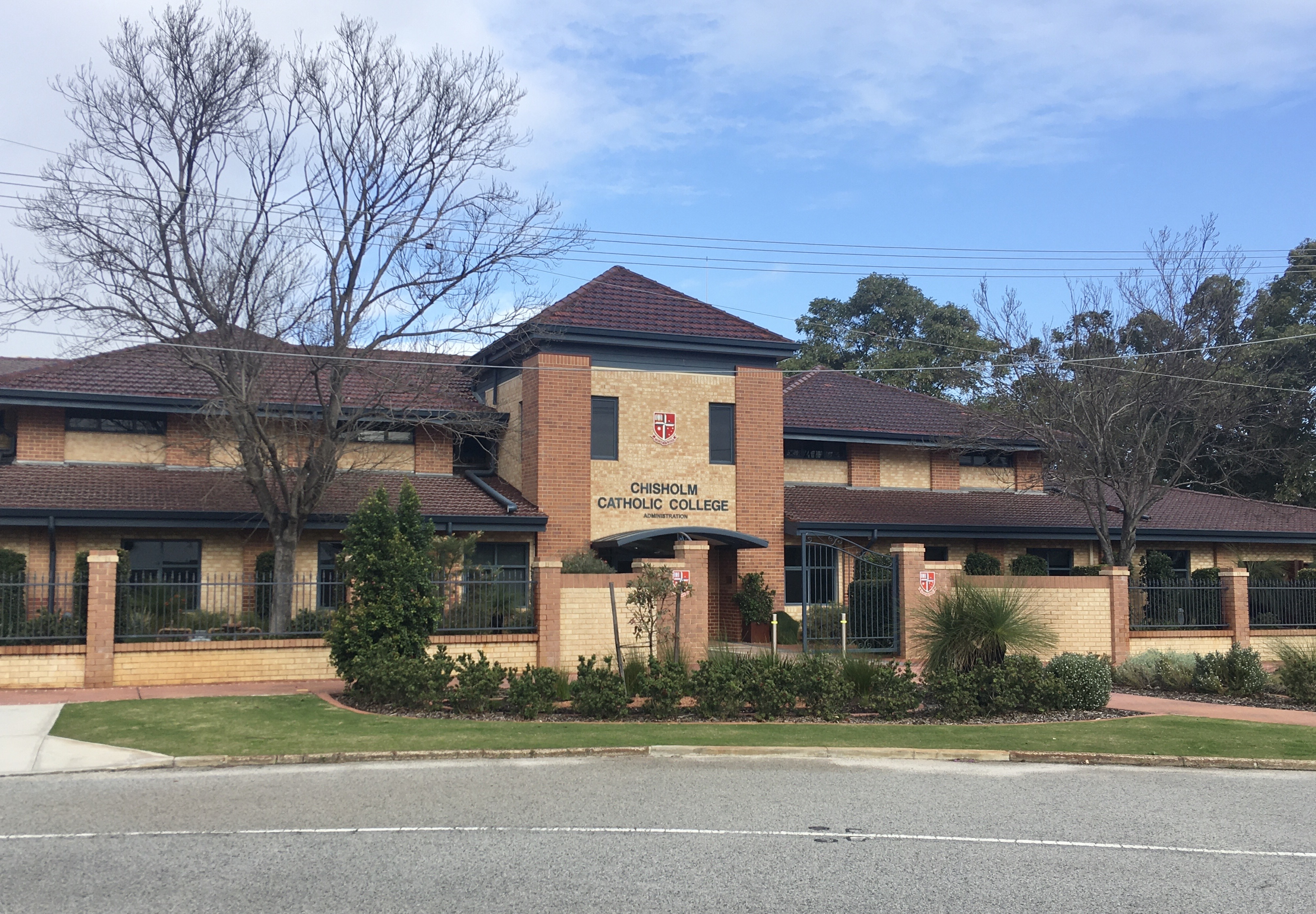
Chisholm Catholic College in July 2021

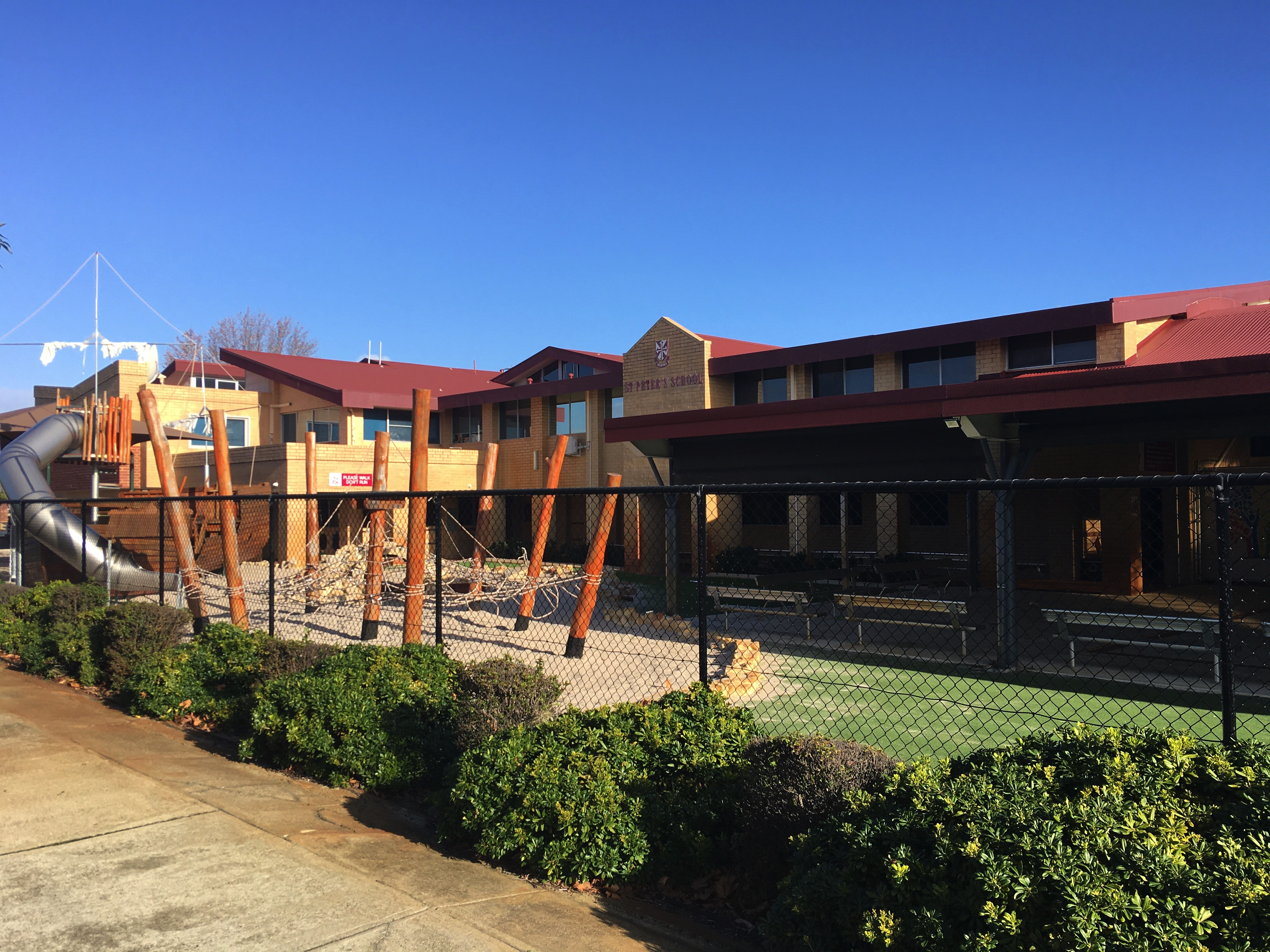
St Peter's Primary School in July 2021

St Peter's Primary School is a Catholic primary school located on Wood Street. It has approximately 700 students in three streams from Kindergarten to Year 6. The school first opened in 1941, occupying a single house. The school moved down the street to its current site in 1942. Expansions occurred in the 1950s, and in 1957, a secondary school for girls named St Thomas Aquinas College opened on the same site. The two schools would undergo significant improvements and renovations over the decades that followed.

Meanwhile, St Mark’s College, a secondary school for boys, was established on Beaufort Street in Bedford. In 1989, St Thomas Aquinas College and St Mark's College merged to form Chisholm Catholic College. St Thomas Aquinas became the campus for lower school students, and St Mark's became the campus for senior school students. In 2003, the school was consolidated on the Beaufort Street site, and the Wood Street site became solely for St Peter's Primary School. Today, Chisholm Catholic College has 1,700 students from Year 7 to 12.

There are no public primary schools in Bedford, but parts of the suburb are in the intake areas of Hillcrest Primary School, Inglewood Primary School and Morley Primary School. There are also no public secondary schools in Bedford, but the suburb is in the intake area for John Forrest Secondary College.

== Governance ==
=== Local ===
Bedford is in the City of Bayswater local government area. It lies fully within the City's west ward. Councillors for the west ward are Lorna Clarke, Giorgia Johnson and Dan Bull.

=== State ===
Bedford is within the electoral district of Maylands, which is a strong seat for the centre-left Labor Party, who have held it since 1968. Mayland's current member is Lisa Baker. In the Western Australian Legislative Council, this district is part of the East Metropolitan electoral region.

The results below combine the results of the polling places in Bedford.

2021 state election Source: WAEC
Labor	79.4%
Liberal	20.0%
Greens	14.6%
NMV	3.1%
One Nation	1.7%

2017 state election Source: WAEC
Labor	48.5%
Liberal	28.1%
Greens	14.3%
Matheson	1.5%
Christians	1.0%

2013 state election Source: WAEC
Liberal	42.2%
Labor	39.3%
Greens	10.4%
Christians	1.8%

2008 state election Source: WAEC
Labor	41.7%
Liberal	33.3%
Greens	16.0%
CDP	2.8%

2005 state election Source: WAEC
Labor	54.2%
Liberal	25.9%
Greens	8.8%
CDP	3.7%
Family First	2.7%

2001 state election Source: WAEC
Labor	51.0%
Liberal	25.0%
Greens	7.2%
One Nation	5.6%
Democrats	3.1%

=== Federal ===
Bedford is within the Division of Perth in the Australian Federal Government. It is a safe seat for the Australian Labor Party, and has been held by a Labor member since 1983. Its current member is Patrick Gorman.

The results below are the results for the Bedford polling place, at Beaufort Park Hall.

2019 federal election Source: AEC
Labor	38.5%
Liberal	33.7%
Greens	19.8%
WAP	2.0%
One Nation	1.8%

2019 Perth by-election Source: AEC
Labor	42.7%
Greens	19.8%
Independent	8.8%
Independent	5.8%
Julie Matheson	5.7%

2016 federal election Source: AEC
Liberal	40.1%
Labor	39.9%
Greens	16.7%
LDP	1.8%
ODD	1.6%

2013 federal election Source: AEC
Labor	42.6%
Liberal	41.3%
Greens	10.5%
PUP	2.7%
Christians	1.2%

2010 federal election Source: AEC
Labor	43.0%
Liberal	38.3%
Greens	15.5%
CDP	1.1%
Family First	1.1%

2007 federal election Source: AEC
Labor	47.3%
Liberal	37.7%
Greens	11.0%
CDP	1.2%
Independent	1.1%

2004 federal election Source: AEC
Labor	47.1%
Liberal	37.0%
Greens	10.1%
Democrats	1.9%
CDP	1.5%

== Transport ==
Cars are the most popular mode of transport in Bedford. The 2016 Australian census said that 61.0% of residents travelled to work in a car. However, bus usage is significantly above the state average. 10.0% of Bedford residents said they take the bus to work compared to 3.9% of Western Australians.

=== Road ===
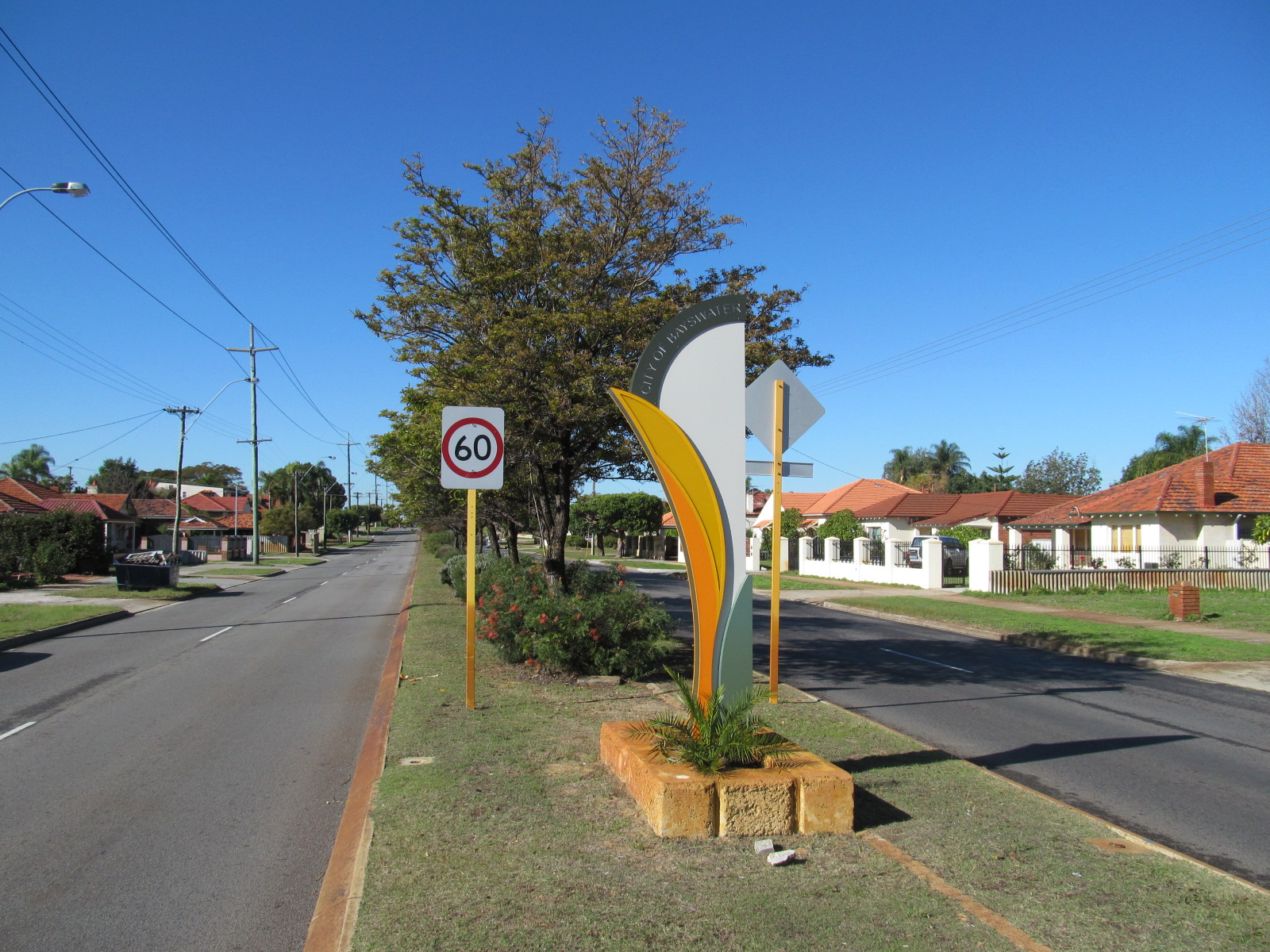
Grand Promenade south of Walter Road

Major roads that go through or along the edge of Bedford are Beaufort Street, Coode Street, Grand Promenade and Walter Road. All these roads aside from Coode Street have two lanes in each direction and a speed limit of 60 kilometres per hour (37 mph). Beaufort Street is the suburb's main link to the Perth central business district. It also links to Morley and areas further east. Coode Street links to the Bayswater town centre and Guildford Road. Walter Road links to the surrounding suburbs. Grand Promenade links to Dianella Plaza and Morley Drive in the north-west, and Garratt Road in the south-east. Garratt Road leads to Guildford Road and across the Swan River at the Garratt Road Bridge.

=== Public transport ===
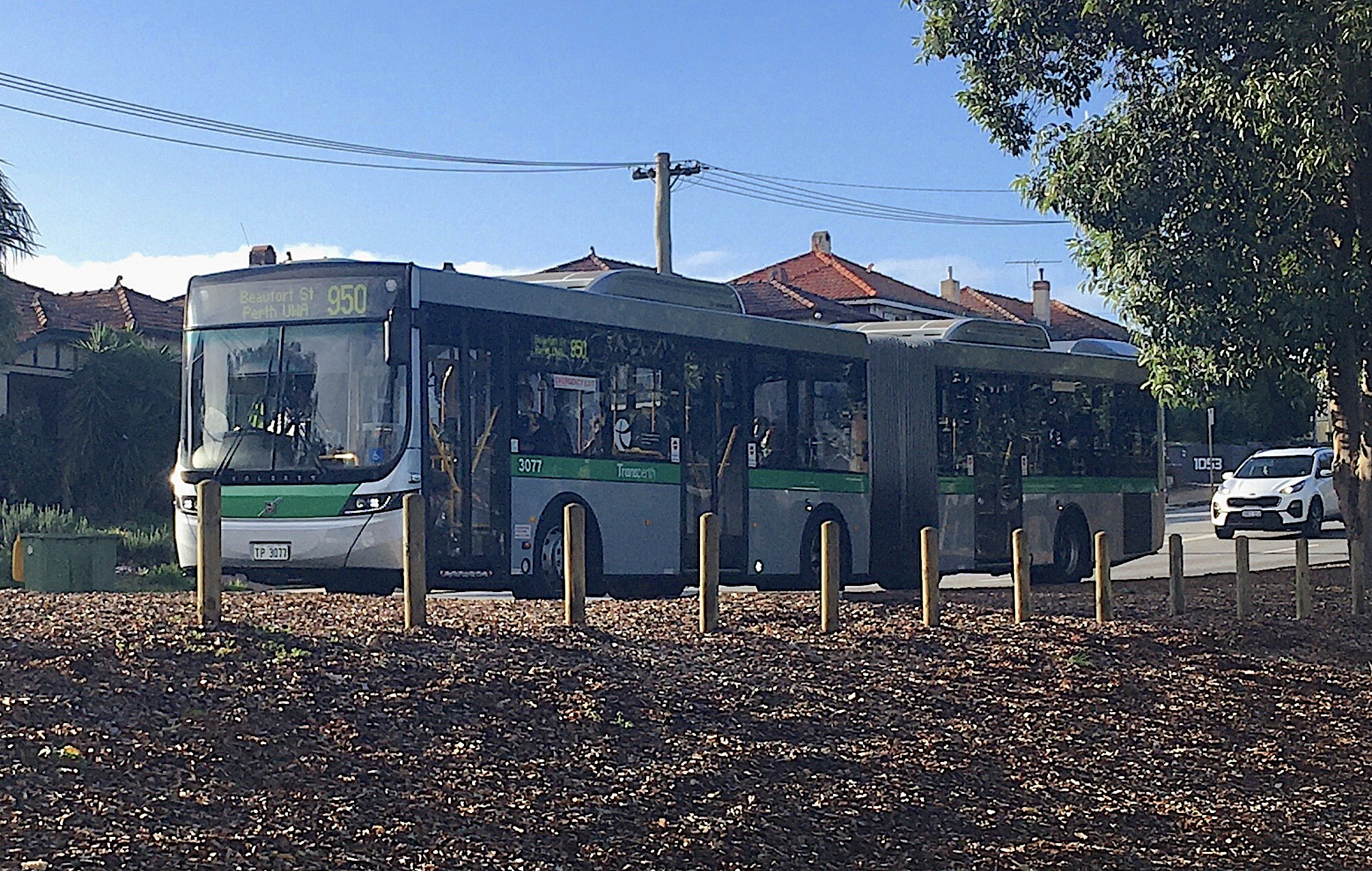
Transperth route 950 bus on Beaufort Street

Along Beaufort Street, Bedford is served by Transperth routes 66 and 950, both of which travel between Galleria bus station and the Perth central business district. The 950 continues through Elizabeth Quay bus station to connect to the University of Western Australia and the Queen Elizabeth II Medical Centre, whereas route 66 terminates at Perth Busport and is a limited stops route. Routes 998 and 999, also known as the CircleRoute, travel along Coode Street and Walter Road, deviating off to Galleria bus station. These routes link to Bayswater station in the south and Dianella shopping centre in the north. Route 60 travels along Walter Road, linking to Galleria bus station and Elizabeth Quay bus station. Route 67 travels along Grand Promenade towards Mirrabooka bus station and along Beaufort Street to Perth Busport. Route 68 takes a similar path, but deviates along Craven Street and various other minor roads in Bedford. It winds its way through other suburbs towards Mirrabooka bus station. Route 980 runs along Walter Road between Galleria bus station and Elizabeth Quay bus station.
