= Inglewood, Western Australia =

Inglewood
- Suburb
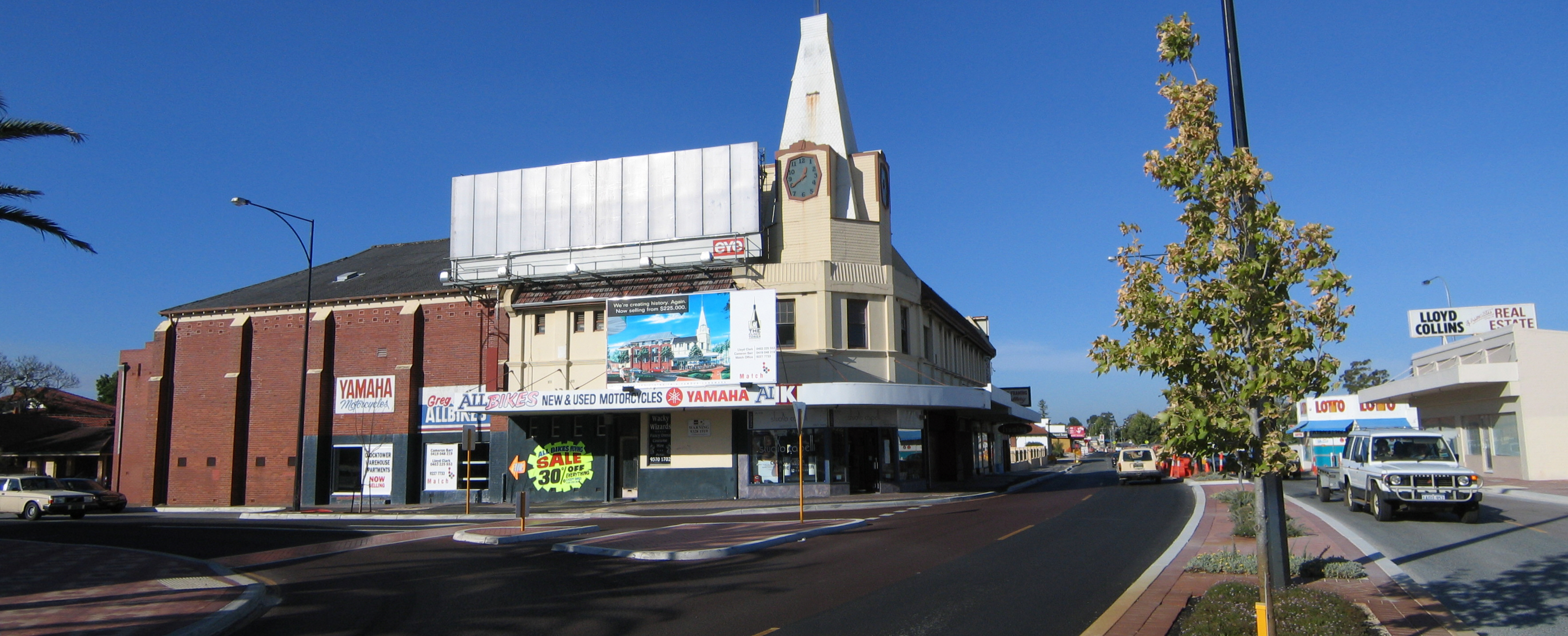
- Beaufort Street, Inglewood, Western Australia
- Interactive map of Inglewood
- Coordinates: 31.917°S 115.883°E
- Country: Australia
- State: Western Australia
- City: Perth
- LGA: City of Stirling
- Location: 5 km (3.1 mi) NE of Perth CBD

Government
  - State electorate: Maylands, Mount Lawley
  - Federal division: Perth

Area
  - Total: 2.9 km^{2} (1.1 sq mi)

Population
  - Total: 5,837 (SAL 2021)
- Postcode: 6052
Suburbs around Inglewood
| Yokine | Dianella | Bedford |
| Menora | Inglewood | Bayswater |
| Mount Lawley | Mount Lawley | Maylands |

Inglewood is an inner-city suburb of Perth, Western Australia, 4 kilometres (2 mi) north-east of its central business district. It is located within the local government area of the City of Stirling.

== History ==
With a name thought to have been derived from the Norwegian barque Inglewood (its late nineteenth century voyage was mentioned in The West Australian on 24 May 1904), the suburb of Inglewood began when land was first granted to John Gregory in 1831. It is also plausible to derive that the suburb was named after the Inglewood Gold rush region of California given the suburb was developed during the gold boom era of the 1890s by a company calling itself Gold Estates of Australia. E.W. Hammer named part of the estate "Inglewood Estate" in 1895.

Regarded as part of Maylands in the early years, Inglewood was initially developed by a company called Gold Estates of Australia and a section now referred to as The Avenues was the first to be subdivided. This development included land from the railway line to North Street and eventually through to Eleventh Avenue and Dundas Road; the later subdivision was named Inglewood Estate.

== Residential development ==
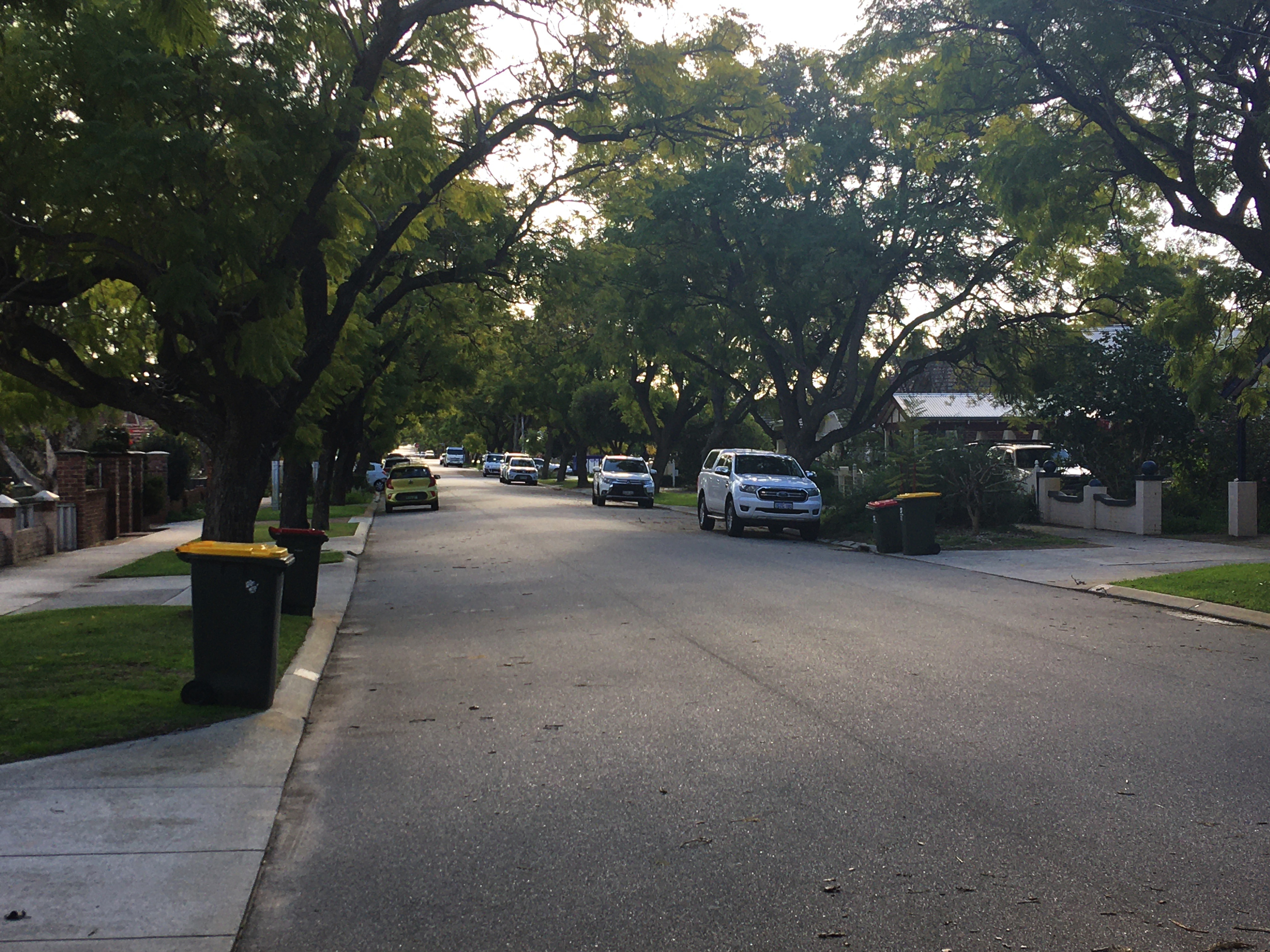
Harcourt Street

Inglewood has experienced two distinct booms in residential growth: between 1904 and 1920 single residential housing was built to accommodate the blue-collar population while more development occurred around World War Two between 1935 and 1940.

The majority of residences in Inglewood are of pre-war vintage (many are of a Federation or Californian bungalow style) and towards Mount Lawley a typical lot size is 730 square metres (7,900 sq ft), increasing to up to 1,400 square metres (15,000 sq ft) east of Beaufort Street.

Inglewood has a high heritage value with numerous places of cultural and historical significance and many of the older dwellings have been renovated and restored to their original styles. In addition to character housing, there are 1960s apartments and modern unit developments scattered throughout the suburb.

== Community development ==
The main commercial area within Inglewood is centred on Beaufort Street and contains retail services, a library and a recreation centre and there are several small shops that cater for daily needs.

Inglewood contains many recreational facilities, including the Terry Tyzack Aquatic Centre, Mount Lawley Golf Course and Macaulay Park, and there are facilities to play tennis and soccer, as well as bocce. Inglewood Primary School meets the educational needs for younger students while the Home of Peace provides services for elderly residents.

== Significant landmarks ==
Significant landmarks include the prominent clock tower on the corner of Beaufort Street and Dundas Road, highly visible to northbound traffic along Beaufort Street, and the Inglewood Civic Centre, opened in 1991, incorporating the local library, an autumn centre and children's centre. Inglewood Primary School, the major school for the area, is located just off Beaufort Street. The clock tower was originally part of a picture theatre - the Civic - and shopping complex designed, built, and owned by Tom Snooks (1890–1958) a local picture-show man and builder-developer from the 1910s to the 1940s. This heritage building complex has recently (2006–2008) been redeveloped for residential purposes.

The suburb contains a number of heritage-listed sites, including the Inglewood Post Office.

== Demographics ==
Inglewood's population at the Australian Bureau of Statistics's 2016 census was 5,674. This is an increase on the 5,503 recorded at the 2011 census, 5,045 recorded at the 2006 census, and the 4,708 recorded at the 2001 census. 48.1% of residents are male, and 51.9% are female. The median age is 38, which is above the Western Australian average of 36, and 44.9% of residents over the age of 15 are married, which is below the state average of 48.8%. Out of the suburb's 2,536 dwellings, 2,282 were occupied and 254 were not. Out of the 2,282 occupied dwellings, 1,403 were detached houses, 373 were semi-detached and 497 were apartments or flats. The proportion of apartments or flats, 21.8%, is significantly higher than Western Australia's average of 5.7%. 614 were owned outright, 816 were owned with a mortgage, 772 were rented and 68 were other or not stated.

The median weekly household income was $1,832, which is higher than the state and the country, which are at $1,595 and $1,438 respectively. Major industries that residents worked in were hospitals (4.4%), state government administration (3.3%), primary education (2.8%), cafes and restaurants (2.8%), and legal services (2.6%).

The population of Inglewood is predominantly Australian born, with 65.9% of residents born in Australia, similar to the state's average of 60.3%. The next most common birthplaces are England (6.7%), New Zealand (1.9%), Italy (1.4%), India (1.4%), and Ireland (1.2%). 38.5% of residents had both parents born in Australia, and 37.8% of residents have neither parent born in Australia. The most popular religious affiliations were none (36.6%), Catholic (27.6%), Anglican (11.9%) and Eastern Orthodox (3.0%).

== Education ==
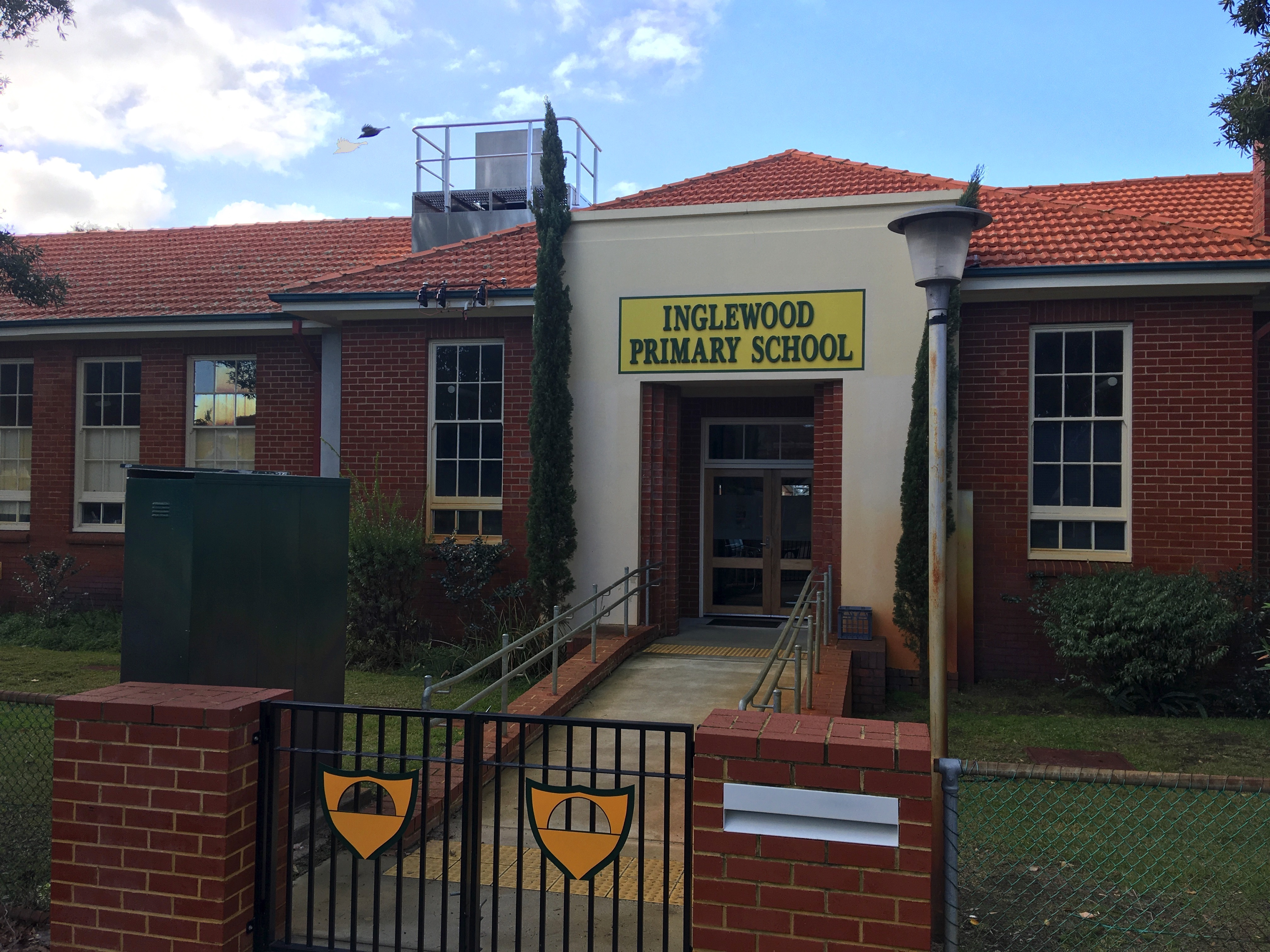
Inglewood Primary School administration entrance

Inglewood Primary School is public primary school on Normanby Road in Inglewood. It has approximately 600 students from Kindergarten to year 6. It was established in 1927 as North Maylands School. It was renamed North Inglewood State School in 1933. It was renamed again to its present name in 1985.

St Peter's Primary School is a Catholic primary school located on Wood Street, on Inglewood's boundary with Bedford. It has approximately 700 students in three streams from Kindergarten to Year 6. The school first opened in 1941, occupying a single house. The school moved down the street to a new site in 1942, that being its current site. Expansions occurred in the 1950s, and in 1957, a secondary school for girls named St Thomas Aquinas College opened on the same site. The two schools would undergo significant improvements and renovations over the decades that followed.

Meanwhile, St Mark’s College, a secondary school for boys, was established on Beaufort Street in Bedford. In 1989, St Thomas Aquinas College and St Mark's College merged to form Chisholm Catholic College. St Thomas Aquinas became the campus for lower school students, and St Mark's became the campus for senior school students. In 2003, the school was consolidated on the Beaufort Street site, and the Wood Street site in Inglewood became solely for St Peter's Primary School.

== Governance ==
Inglewood is part of the Inglewood ward of the City of Stirling. Elections are held on the third Saturday of October for every odd year, and councillors are elected to four year terms. Councillors for the Inglewood ward are David Lagan, whose term expires in 2023, and Bianca Sandri, who is also the deputy mayor and whose term expires in 2021.

For the Western Australian Legislative Assembly, Inglewood is part of the electoral district of Maylands east of Hamer Parade and Walter Road West, and part of the electoral district of Mount Lawley west, although no residents live in that part. Both these electoral districts are part of the East Metropolitan electoral region in the Western Australian Legislative Council. Maylands is a strong seat for the centre-left Labor Party, having held Maylands since 1968. Maylands' current member is Lisa Baker.

Inglewood is within the Division of Perth in the Australian Federal Government. It is a safe seat for the Australian Labor Party, and has been held by a Labor member since 1983. Its current member is Patrick Gorman.

Inglewood has two locations that are usually used as polling locations at elections. They are Inglewood Primary School and Inglewood Masonic Hall.

== Transport ==
The suburb is served by a number of Transperth bus routes operated by Path Transit. The 360, 361, 362 (Alexander Heights-Perth) and 960 (Mirrabooka-Perth-Curtin University) cover Alexander Drive. The 66, 67, 68, 950 and 980 buses pass through Inglewood along Walter Road and Beaufort Street.
