= Hepburn Avenue =

Road in Perth, Western Australia

Hepburn Avenue Western Australia
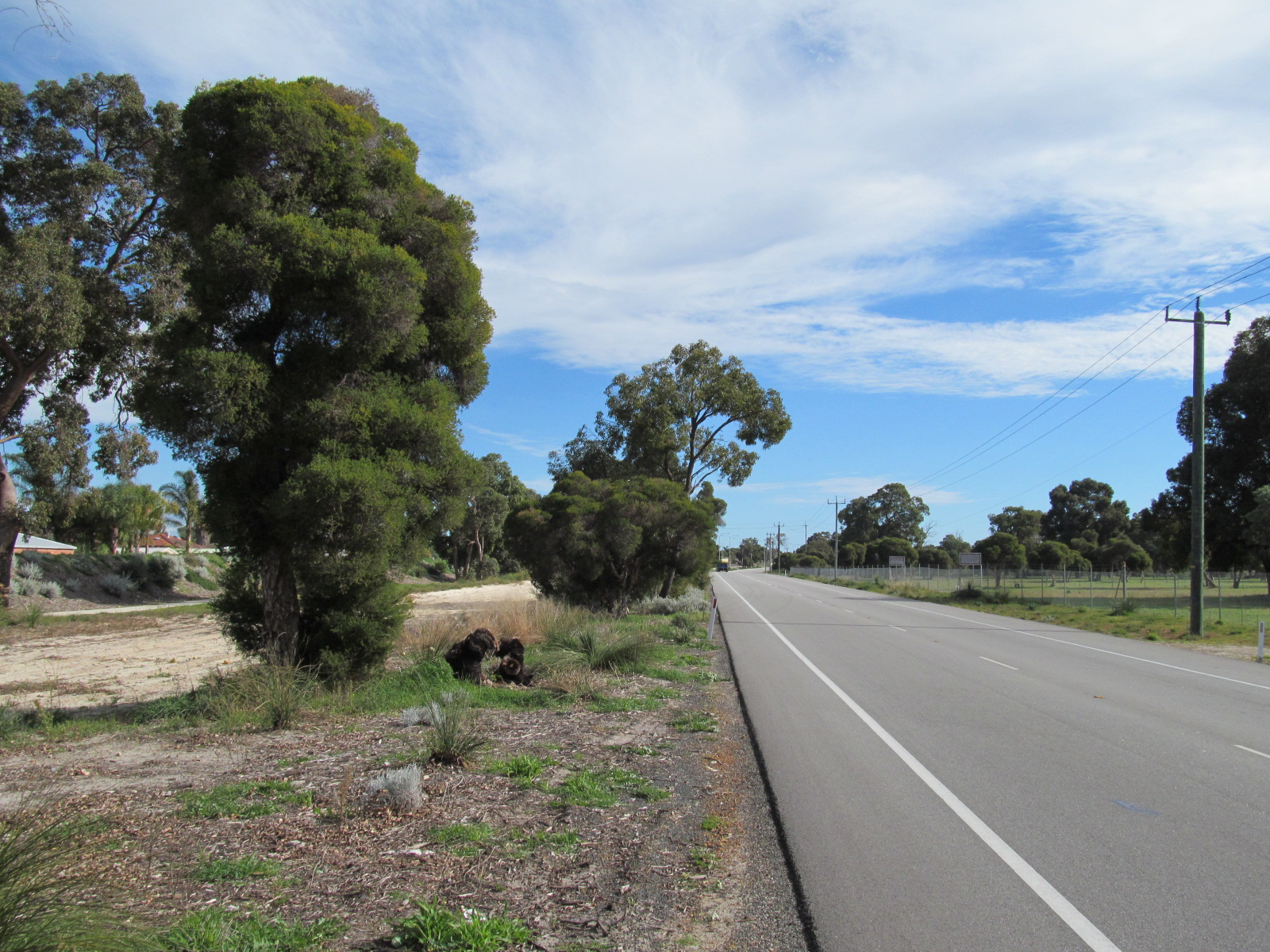
- Single carriageway section near Lyrebird Square, Ballajura

General information
- Type: Road
- Length: 18 km (11 mi)
- Route number(s): State Route 82

Major junctions
- West end: Whitfords Avenue (Tourist Drive 204), Hillarys
- Marmion Avenue (State Route 71); Mitchell Freeway (State Route 2); Wanneroo Road (State Route 60); Alexander Drive (State Route 56); Marangaroo Drive (State Route 81)
- East end: Tonkin Highway interchange with Beechboro Road North Cullacabardee

Location(s)
- Major suburbs: Sorrento, Padbury, Duncraig, KingsleyGreenwood, Marangaroo, Ballajura

Hepburn Avenue is an arterial east–west road in the northern suburbs of Perth, Western Australia. The road links Sorrento in the west with Malaga and Whiteman in the east. It also connects the residential developments that span its length with several local facilities, as well as major road routes into central Perth.

== History ==
The road was built in the 1980s to meet suburban demand and was originally proposed on the Metropolitan Region Scheme as a freeway. It was named after Alistair Hepburn (1915–2004), one of the drafters of the Scheme together with Professor Gordon Stephenson (1908–1997). Between 1986 and 1988, Hepburn Avenue represented the northern terminus of the Mitchell Freeway.

Subsequent additions east of Wanneroo Road, the original terminus, have been built in stages — in the late 1990s it was extended further east, reaching Alexander Drive in 2005, and extending to Beechboro Road in October 2010. The opening of the extension was delayed several months due to street lighting issues. Construction began on the next 1.3 kilometres (0.81 mi) extension through to Marshall Road in August 2010, and was opened in June 2012.

Works to upgrade Hepburn Avenue to a dual carriageway were constructed between the late 2000s to the early 2010s. The first stage was from Wanneroo Road to Giralt Road, completed in the late 2000s. Next was from Alexander Drive to Mirrabooka Avenue, completed in 2010. The remaining part between Mirrabooka Avenue and Bellerive Boulevard was upgraded in 2012. The last section to become a dual carriageway, east of Alexander Drive was completed in 2017.

During 2018–19, the eastern end of Hepburn Avenue was upgraded to link with a realigned Beechboro Road North at a grade separated roundabout interchange with Tonkin Highway as part of NorthLink WA.

== Route description ==
View eastbound from Hartman Drive

View eastbound from Wanneroo Road

Hepburn Avenue begins at a roundabout, joining with West Coast Drive, Whitfords Avenue and Hillarys Boat Harbour carpark, and ends at a roundabout interchange at Tonkin Highway, continuing eastwards as Beechboro Road North. Hepburn Avenue provides direct access to Kingsway City shopping centre in Madeley and St Stephen's School in Duncraig, as well as the Greenwood railway station, which was constructed at the Mitchell Freeway interchange, and opened in January 2005. Hepburn Avenue is a four lane dual carriageway for its entire length (an exception was the section between Beechboro Road North and Marshall Road but this was removed with the development of NorthLink WA). Hepburn Avenue is allocated State Route 82 for its entire length from 2019 onwards; before then this allocation only extended eastwards to Wanneroo Road.

=== Hillarys Boat Harbour to Wanneroo Road ===
Hepburn Avenue commences at the roundabout just east of the main entrance to the Hillarys Boat Harbour, with Whitfords Avenue to the north and West Coast Drive to the south. From that roundabout, Hepburn Avenue runs for 1.8 kilometres (1.1 mi) bordering the suburbs of Hillarys to the north and Sorrento to the south before encountering a traffic light controlled intersection at fellow arterial road Marmion Avenue. Following this intersection Hepburn Avenue runs for 2.2 kilometres (1.4 mi) bordering Padbury to the north and Duncraig to the south and encountering some local roads and providing access to St Stephen's School, before encountering Mitchell Freeway at a standard diamond interchange. The southbound entrance ramp to the freeway provides access to Greenwood railway station. The road then borders Kingsley to the north and Greenwood to the south for 3.7 kilometres (2.3 mi), intersecting with several local roads within the area before meeting arterial highway Wanneroo Road at a traffic light controlled intersection. This intersection marks the former eastern terminus of State Route 82, and Wanneroo Road is the boundary of both the City of Joondalup and Wanneroo local government areas.

=== East of Wanneroo Road ===
Following the Wanneroo Road intersection, Hepburn Avenue is now within the City of Wanneroo. For 1.5 kilometres (0.93 mi), Hepburn Avenue borders Madeley to the north and Marangaroo to the south, during which it provides access to the Kingsway City shopping centre and local sporting areas in Madeley. The road then reaches Hartman Drive at a roundabout, with the suburb boundary to the north changing to Darch. Hepburn Avenue reaches Mirrabooka Avenue at a roundabout 1.6 kilometres (0.99 mi) later, after which Hepburn Avenue borders Landsdale to the north and Alexander Heights to the south for another 2.2 kilometres (1.4 mi) before reaching Alexander Drive at a traffic light controlled intersection.

Hepburn Avenue then heads into the City of Swan LGA, now bordering Cullacabardee to the north and Ballajura to the south. It curves to the southeast and does so for the next 4.4 kilometres (2.7 mi), intersecting with Marangaroo Drive, Lakefarm Retreat, and Bellefin Drive, before finally terminating at a roundabout interchange at Tonkin Highway and continuing southwards as Beechboro Road North following the interchange.

== Major intersections ==
All intersections listed below are roundabout-controlled unless otherwise indicated.

LGA	Location	km	mi	Destinations	Notes
Joondalup	Hillarys	0.0	0.0	Northside Drive north / Southside Drive south – Hillarys Boat Harbour	Western terminus
Joondalup	Hillarys–Sorrento boundary	0.1	0.062	Whitfords Avenue north / West Coast Drive (Tourist Drive 204) south – Kallaroo, Mullaloo, Marmion, Trigg	State Route 82 western terminus
Joondalup	Hillarys–Sorrento boundary	0.6	0.37	Amalfi Drive north / Howland Road south	
Joondalup	Padbury–Duncraig–Sorrento–Hillarys quadripoint	2	1.2	Marmion Avenue (State Route 71) – Yanchep, Craigie, Carine, Scarborough	Signalised intersection
Joondalup	Padbury–Duncraig boundary	2.5	1.6	Gibson Avenue	Signalised T-intersection
Joondalup	Padbury–Duncraig boundary	3.6	2.2	Glengarry Drive	
Joondalup	Kingsley–Greenwood–Duncraig–Padbury quadripoint	4.2– 4.4	2.6– 2.7	Mitchell Freeway (State Route 2) – Butler, Joondalup, Stirling, Perth	Signalised diamond interchange favouring Mitchell Freeway. Access to Greenwood railway station.
Joondalup	Kingsley–Greenwood boundary	4.8	3.0	Kingsley Drive	Signalised T-intersection
Wanneroo-Joondalup boundary	Madeley–Marangaroo–Greenwood–Kingsley quadripoint	7.9	4.9	Wanneroo Road (State Route 60) – Lancelin, Wanneroo, Balcatta, Perth	Signalised intersection
Wanneroo	Madeley–Marangaroo boundary	8.4	5.2	Giralt Road	Signalised intersection
Wanneroo	Madeley–Marangaroo boundary	9.1	5.7	Spectator Drive	
Wanneroo	Darch–Marangaroo–Madeley tripoint	9.5	5.9	Hartman Drive – Wangara	
Wanneroo	Darch–Marangaroo boundary	9.9	6.2	Highclere Boulevard – Wangara	
Wanneroo	Landsdale–Alexander Heights–Marangaroo–Darch quadripoint	11.1	6.9	Mirrabooka Avenue – Gnangara, Balga, Mirrabooka, Nollamara	
Swan-Wanneroo boundary	Landsdale–Cullacabardee–Ballajura–Alexander Heights quadripoint	11.1	6.9	Alexander Drive (State Route 56) – Gnangara, Dianella, North Perth	Signalised intersection
Swan	Cullacabardee–Ballajura boundary	15.0	9.3	Marangaroo Drive (State Route 81) – Koondoola, Girrawheen	Unsignalised T-intersection
Swan	Cullacabardee–Ballajura boundary	17.0	10.6	Bellefin Drive – Malaga	
Swan	Ballajura–Cullacabardee–Whiteman tripoint	17.9	11.1	Tonkin Highway (State Route 4) – Muchea, Ellenbrook, Morley, Perth Airport	Eastern terminus for both Hepburn Avenue and State Route 82 at a roundabout interchange favouring Tonkin Highway. Continues as Beechboro Road North southeast-bound (State Route 53)
Swan	Bennett Springs–Whiteman–Ballajura–Malaga quadripoint	19.1	11.9	Marshall Road	Previous terminus at a signalised T-intersection; replaced by the Tonkin Highway interchange as part of NorthLink WA
Swan	Closed/former; Route transition				
