= Marangaroo Drive =

Marangaroo Drive Western Australia
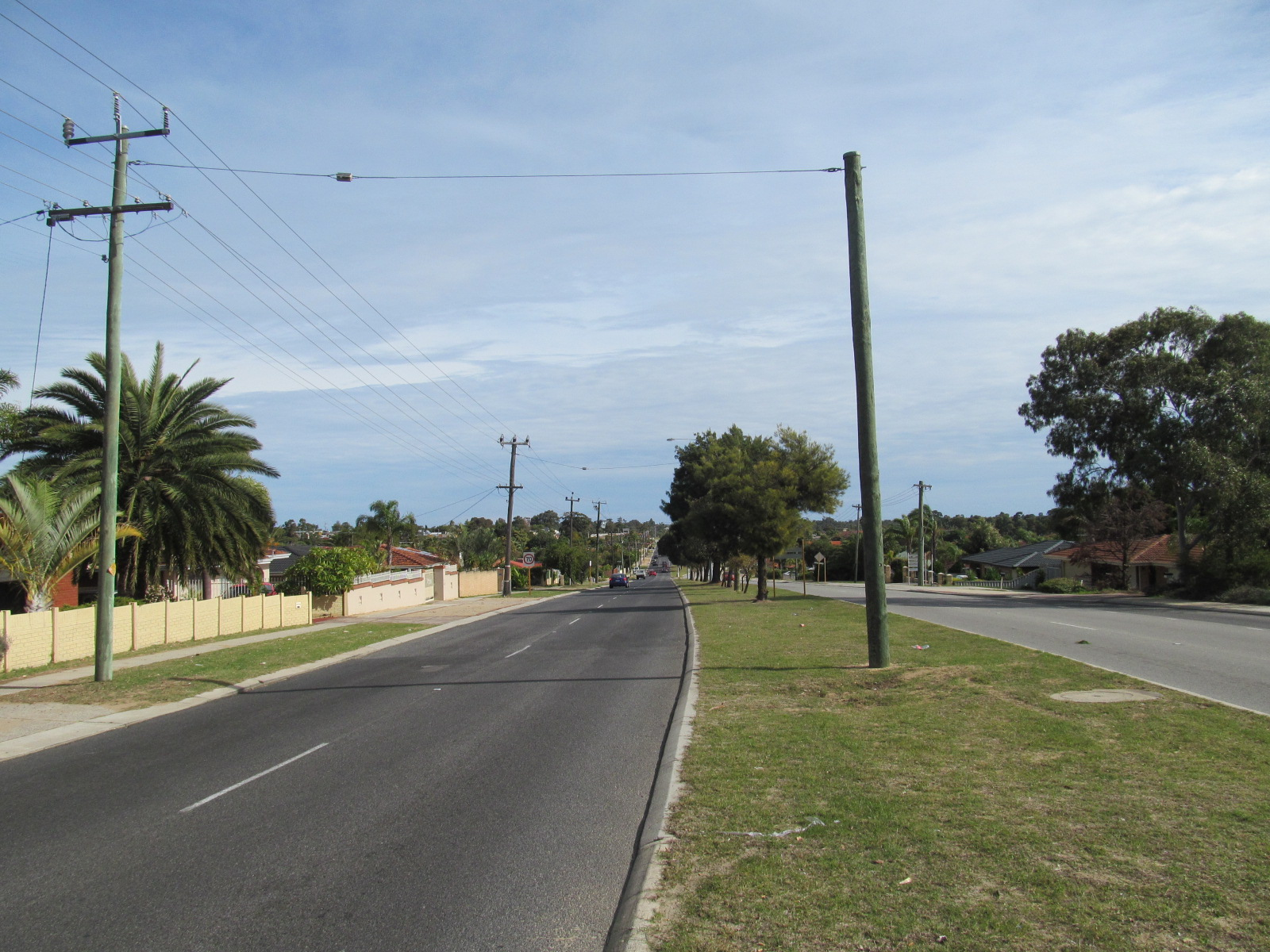
- Marangaroo Drive near Highclere Boulevard

General information
- Type: Road
- Length: 7.1 km (4.4 mi)
- Opened: 1970s
- Route number(s): State Route 81

Major junctions
- West end: Wanneroo Road (State Route 60), Marangaroo
- Mirrabooka Avenue; Alexander Drive (State Route 56)
- East end: Hepburn Avenue Ballajura

Location(s)
- Major suburbs: Marangaroo, Alexander Heights, Ballajura

Marangaroo Drive is an arterial east-west road located in the northern suburbs of Perth, Western Australia. This road was originally part of Warwick Road, but in the late 1970s, Warwick Road was realigned, so the section of Warwick Road that was east of Wanneroo Road was discontinuous with the part that was west. The part that was east was renamed Marangaroo Drive, after the suburb Marangaroo. Marangaroo Drive is now extended through the suburb of Ballajura so it connects with Hepburn Avenue.

Marangaroo Drive is now part of State Route 81, which Warwick Road is also a part of, connected by a small part of Wanneroo Road. This route connects the coastal suburbs of Sorrento and Marmion with Ballajura.

Marangaroo Drive is almost entirely a four-lane dual carriageway with a brief section that is two-lane around the roundabout with Illawarra Crescent in Ballajura. It passes through mostly residential areas, also passing by Newpark Shopping Centre, Girrawheen Senior High School and Koondoola Regional Bushland.

== Junction list ==
LGA	Location	km	mi	Destinations	Notes
Joondalup–Wanneroo	Warwick–Greenwood–Marangaroo tripoint	0.0	0.0	Wanneroo Road (State Route 60) – Tuart Hill, Wanneroo	Marangaroo Drive terminus; State route 81 continues south on Wanneroo Road; Traffic light controlled t-junction
Wanneroo	Marangaroo–Girrawheen boundary	1.6	0.99	Highclare Boulevard – Marangaroo, Darch	Traffic light controlled t-junction
Wanneroo	Girrawheen–Marangaroo–Alexander Heights–Koondoola quadripoint	3.3	2.1	Mirrabooka Avenue – Mirrabooka, Landsdale	Traffic light controlled intersection
Wanneroo	Koondoola–Alexander Heights boundary	4.5	2.8	The Avenue – Alexander Heights	Traffic light controlled t-junction
Wanneroo–Swan boundary	Koondoola–Alexander Heights–Ballajura tripoint	5.5	3.4	Alexander Drive – Perth, Dianella, Landsdale	State Route 81 eastern terminus; Traffic light controlled t-junction
Swan	Ballajura–Cullacabardee boundary	7.1	4.4	Hepburn Avenue – Hillarys, Malaga	Marangaroo Drive eastern terminus; Traffic light controlled t-junction
Concurrency terminus
