= Balga, Western Australia =

Balga
- Suburb
- Interactive map of Balga
- Coordinates: 31.859°S 115.839°E
- Country: Australia
- State: Western Australia
- City: Perth
- LGA: City of Stirling
- Location: 13 km (8.1 mi) N of Perth
- Established: 1954

Government
  - State electorate: Mirrabooka
  - Federal division: Cowan

Area
  - Total: 5.2 km^{2} (2.0 sq mi)

Population
  - Total: 13,864 (SAL 2021)
- Postcode: 6061
Suburbs around Balga
Warwick	Girrawheen	Koondoola
Hamersley	Balga	Mirrabooka
Balcatta	Westminster	Mirrabooka

Balga is a suburb of Perth, the capital city of Western Australia, 13 kilometres (8 mi) north of Perth city's central business district (CBD). Its local government area is the City of Stirling. Mark Irwin is the current mayor.

The name "Balga" was adopted in 1954 and is the Noongar (Aboriginal) word for the indigenous grass tree Xanthorrhoea preissii. It was designed by the State Housing Commission along with Nollamara and Westminster as part of the "Mirrabooka Project", and the laying of streets and building of homes commenced in the 1960s.

== Geography ==
Balga is 13 kilometres (8 mi) north of Perth, and is bounded by Wanneroo Road to the west, Reid Highway to the south, Mirrabooka Avenue to the east and Beach Road to the north.

== Demographics ==
At the 2011 census, Balga had a population of 10,701. Balga residents had a median age of 31, and median incomes were well below average for the Perth metropolitan area and the region — $490 per week compared with $669 per week in Perth, and $685 in the Perth North West statistical region. The population of Balga was more ethnically diverse than the Perth average, with 49.1% born in Australia and significant minorities from Sudan, Italy, Macedonia, Vietnam and Burma identified in the 2011 census. At the 2011 census, 3.72% of residents identified as Indigenous Australians.

== Education ==
Balga contains a state high school, Balga Senior High School which opened in 1970; three state primary schools, Balga (1965), North Balga (1968) and Warriapendi (1970); one special school, the Gladys Newton School; and one private school, Majella Catholic Primary School (1971). Additionally, a campus of North Metropolitan TAFE (formerly known as Polytechnic West) is in the southeast of the suburb.

Balga Senior High School includes an Intensive English Centre for newly arrived refugee students, a program for teenage parents, a sports-based education program for indigenous students, and an emphasis on literacy, numeracy, health and careers through all levels of the school.

== Transport ==
The suburb is served by a number of Transperth bus routes operated by Swan Transit (374, 375, 386, 386X, 388, 389, 970 and 970X) and Path Transit (975). The 374 (Mirrabooka-Darch and occasionally to Whitfords Station) and 375 (Mirrabooka-Alexander Heights) covers Marangaroo Drive and inner portions of the Suburb, the 389 (Perth–Wanneroo) covers Wanneroo Road, and the 386 and 386X (during peak), runs Perth–Kingsway City Shopping Centre in Madeley, 975 (Warwick Station to Mirrabooka Station via Treen St) routes along with various routes from Mirrabooka bus station, 970 and 970X covers eastern end of the suburb and 449 covers for the northern end.

=== Bus ===
- 374 Mirrabooka Bus Station to Whitfords Station – serves Mirrabooka Avenue, Balga Avenue and Princess Road
- 375 Mirrabooka Bus Station to Alexander Heights Shopping Centre – serves Walderton Avenue, Fernhurst Crescent, Loxwood Road, Balga Avenue, Finchley Crescent, Redcliffe Avenue and Beach Road
- 386 Perth Busport to Kingsway City – serves Princess Road
- 386X Perth Busport to Kingsway City (limited stops) – serves Princess Road
- 388 Perth Busport to Warwick Station – serves Wanneroo Road
- 389 Perth Busport to Wanneroo – serves Wanneroo Road
- 448 Warwick Station to Kingsway City – serves Beach Road
- 449 Warwick Station to Malaga – serves Beach Road
- 970 Perth Busport to (high frequency) – serves Mirrabooka Avenue
- 970X Perth Busport to (high frequency / limited stops) – serves Mirrabooka Avenue
- 975 Warwick Station to Bayswater Station (high frequency) – serves Wanneroo Road, Culloton Crescent, Camberwell Road and Princess Road
