= Girrawheen, Western Australia =

Girrawheen
- Suburb
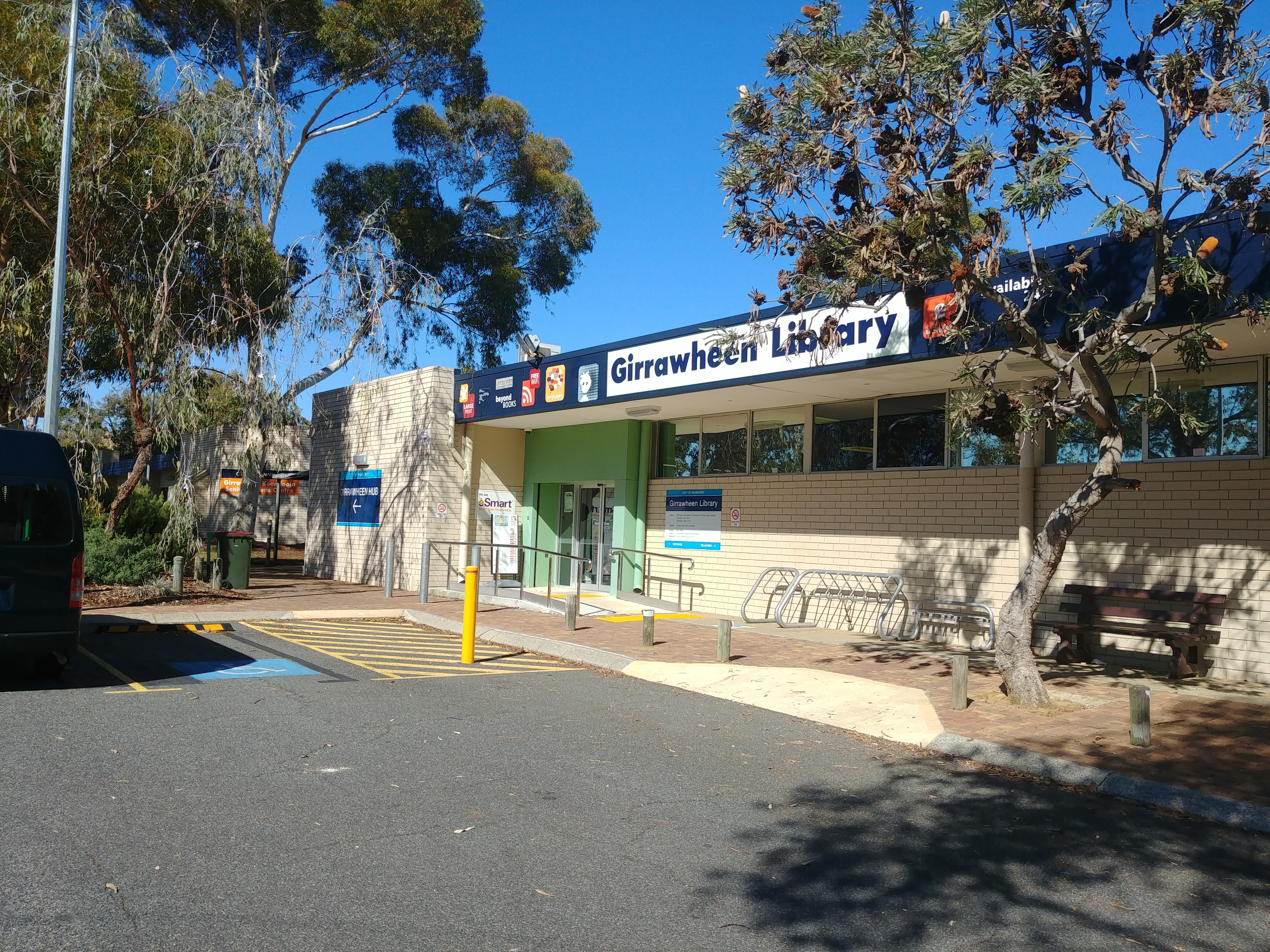
- Girrawheen Library
- Interactive map of Girrawheen
- Coordinates: 31.836°S 115.832°E
- Country: Australia
- State: Western Australia
- City: Perth
- LGA: City of Wanneroo
- Location: 15 km (9.3 mi) N of Perth
- Established: 1970s

Government
  - State electorate: Mirrabooka
  - Federal division: Cowan

Area
  - Total: 4.1 km^{2} (1.6 sq mi)

Population
  - Total: 8,897 (SAL 2021)
- Postcode: 6064
Suburbs around Girrawheen
Greenwood	Marangaroo	Alexander Heights
Warwick	Girrawheen	Koondoola
Hamersley	Balga	Mirrabooka

Girrawheen is a northern suburb of Perth, the capital city of Western Australia. Its local government area is the City of Wanneroo.

== History ==
In October 1969, the Government, in a bid to offer affordable land for housing following the McCarrey Report, rezoned a large portion of land in the area from Urban Deferred to Urban, which was then included in land set aside for the State Housing Commission under the Mirrabooka satellite city development scheme. The plan never came to fruition, although a town planning scheme was approved by the Shire of Wanneroo in September 1970.

On 26 June 1970, the Shire gazetted the name "Girrawheen", meaning "place of flowers" or "the place where flowers grow" in an Eastern States Aboriginal language, possibly that of the Kambuwal people in southeastern Queensland. The name was already in use for the Girraween National Park near Stanthorpe, Queensland, and a suburb of Girraween in western Sydney was gazetted five years later.

== Geography ==
Girrawheen is located 15 kilometres (9 mi) north of Perth's central business district, and is bounded by Wanneroo Road to the west, Beach Road to the south, Marangaroo Drive to the north and Mirrabooka Avenue to the east.

== Demographics ==
In the 2011 census, Girrawheen had a population of 8,334.

Girrawheen residents had a median age of 33 compared to the Perth median of 37, and median incomes were below average for the state — $494 per week compared with $662 per week. The population of Girrawheen was ethnically mixed — while 53.3% were born in Australia, the next most common countries of birth were England 5.4%, Vietnam 5.1%, Burma (Republic of the Union of Myanmar) 3.5%, New Zealand 2.8% and Sudan 1.7%. 3.2% of residents identified as Indigenous Australians.

The most popular religious affiliations in descending order in the 2011 census were Roman Catholic 22.8%, no religion 20.6%, Anglican 13.5%, Buddhism 6.1% and Islam 6.0%.

== Facilities ==
Two small shopping centres, Newpark and Summerfield, provide for the suburb's daily shopping needs. Larger shopping centres at Marangaroo (Kingsway City), Warwick Grove and The Square Mirrabooka are all located within 4 kilometres (2.5 mi) of the suburb's boundaries.

The suburb contains four churches—Uniting and Baptist churches in Salcott Road, and Catholic and non-denominational on Girrawheen Avenue—as well as the Maha Bodhi Buddhist monastery which adheres to the Burmese Theravada tradition. The neighbouring suburb of Mirrabooka contains the At-Taqwa mosque.

Numerous parks are dotted through the suburb and many offer courts, ovals and other sporting facilities. A library and community centre are located adjacent to Summerfield shopping area on Patrick Court, and a recreation centre on Hainsworth Avenue, also serve local residents.

=== Education ===
Girrawheen is located in the Swan Educational District, and contains three state primary schools and one state high school. The socio-economic profile of the suburb together with the high numbers of Vietnamese, Sudanese and Aboriginal students, some of whom have low literacy or English language skills, mean that all schools in the suburb have been a high priority for Commonwealth and State funding and offer specialist literacy support services not found at many other metropolitan schools. Blackmore Primary School, in the suburb's west, opened in 1971 Girrawheen Primary School, in the centre of the suburb, opened in 1975. These two schools Amalgamated in 2008 on the former Girrawheen Primary School site. The new amalgamated school is named Hudson Park Primary School. After the nearby public space utilised for many team and social activities. Roseworth Primary School, the result of a 2008 amalgamation of Hainsworth (1972) and Montrose Primary Schools, currently accommodates 51 pre-primary and 207 primary students. Classes are currently conducted at the former Hainsworth school site until new buildings are completed at the former Montrose site in 2009. The school also has an Education Support Centre with 29 students. In partnership with Edith Cowan University and the Fogarty Foundation, the new school will include a research facility for teaching methods and behaviour management techniques.

Girrawheen Senior High School, whose catchment area covers the suburb as well as neighbouring Koondoola, Marangaroo and Alexander Heights, was built in 1974 and accommodates 521 students, 42 teachers and 44 other staff. Across this population are represented approximately 50 cultural groups and 27 language groups.

Two private primary schools are also located in the suburb—Our Lady of Mercy Primary adjacent to the Summerfield shopping area, and Emmanuel Christian Primary School in Salcott Road, whilst Mercy College, a Catholic school covering Kindergarten to Year 12 and established in 1972 by the Sisters of Mercy, is located just beyond the suburb's southeastern boundary.

=== Transport ===
The suburb is served by a number of Transperth bus routes operated by Path Transit and Swan Transit. The 344 (Warwick–Ballajura–Morley) covers Marangaroo Drive, the 389 (Perth–Wanneroo) covers Wanneroo Road, and the 385 and 386 (Perth–Marangaroo) routes along with various routes including 374 and 375 from Mirrabooka bus station cover other parts of the suburb. Route 448 covers Templeton Crescent and route 449 cover Beach Road.

==== Bus ====
- 375 Mirrabooka Bus Station to Alexander Heights Shopping Centre – serves Beach Road, Hainsworth Avenue and Amberton Avenue
- 389 Wanneroo to Perth Busport – serves Wanneroo Road
- 448 Warwick Station to Kingsway City – serves Beach Road, Blackmore Avenue, Templeton Crescent and Marangaroo Drive
- 449 Warwick Station to Ballajura Station – serves Beach Road
- 450 Warwick Station to Ballajura Station – serves Wanneroo Road
- 451 Warwick Station to Ballajura Station – serves Marangaroo Drive
- 970 Landsdale to Perth Busport (high frequency) – serves Mirrabooka Avenue
- 970X Landsdale to Perth Busport (high frequency / limited stops) – serves Mirrabooka Avenue

Bus routes serving Girrawheen Avenue and Marangaroo Drive:

- 374 Mirrabooka Bus Station to Whitfords Station
- 386 Kingsway City to Perth Busport
- 386X Kingsway City to Perth Busport (limited stops)
