= Alexander Drive =

Road in Perth, Western Australia

Alexander Drive Western Australia
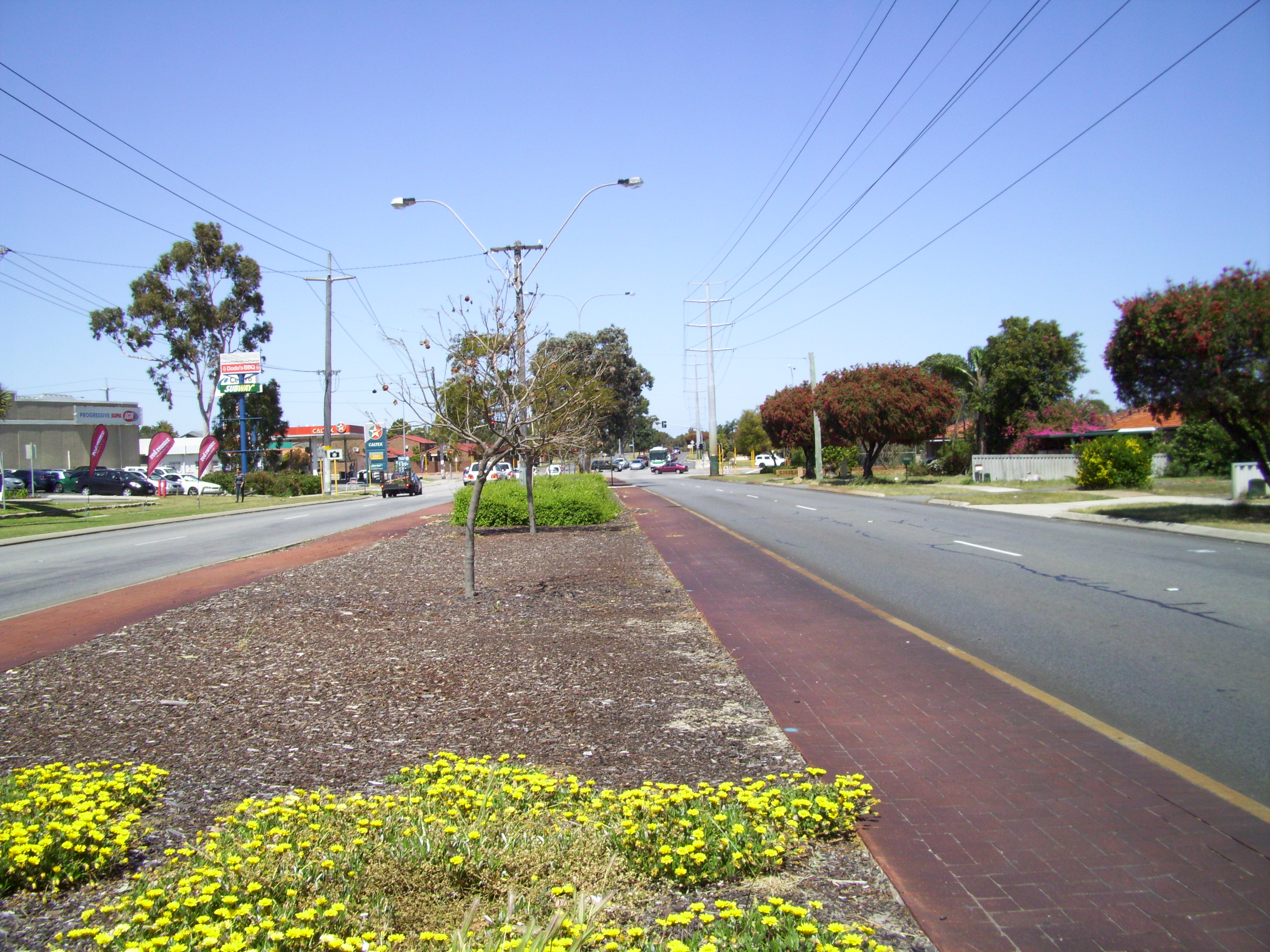
- Looking south, in Dianella

General information
- Type: Road
- Length: 16 km (9.9 mi)
- Opened: 1932
- Route number(s): State Route 56 (Walcott Street to Gnangara Road)

Major junctions
- South end: Walcott Street, Menora
- Morley Drive (State Route 76); Reid Highway (State Route 3); Gnangara Road (State Route 84)
- North end: Cul-de-sac north of Gnangara Road, Gnangara

Location(s)
- Major suburbs: Dianella, Mirrabooka, Ballajura, Landsdale

Alexander Drive is a major north–south arterial road in the northern suburbs of Perth, Western Australia, connecting Perth's central business district (CBD) with Edith Cowan University's Mount Lawley campus and the Malaga industrial area, as well as newer development suburbs to Perth's north. It is used by Transperth bus routes, including the 360, 361 and 362. Alexander Drive was named after Mr S.B. Alexander, a former Wanneroo Road Board member. Alexander Drive runs through the following local government areas City of Wanneroo, City of Swan, City of Bayswater and City of Stirling.

It is known as Road No. 7354 in plans and maps.

== Route description ==
=== Fitzgerald Street ===
State Route 56 starts in Northbridge, adjacent to Perth's CBD, as Fitzgerald Street, travelling northwards through West Perth and North Perth before becoming Alexander Drive at the intersection of Walcott Street.

=== Alexander Drive ===
Alexander Drive officially commences at the traffic light intersection of Walcott Street in Menora in the City of Stirling, with Alexander Drive travelling entirely through the suburb for 700 metres (2,300 ft) before reaching Bradford Street. It briefly borders Mount Lawley and the suburb's Edith Cowan University campus for 350 metres (1,150 ft) before reaching Central Avenue, and changing borders to the east with Inglewood. The border to the west changes to Yokine only 550 metres (1,800 ft) later. About 1 kilometre (0.62 mi) later the road is within the suburb of Dianella, with the Woodrow Avenue intersection not any further down.

From Woodrow Avenue, Alexander Drive intersects Grand Promenade 900 metres (3,000 ft) later, and then Morley Drive at a hamburger roundabout 600 metres (2,000 ft) down the road. This roundabout also features left-in/left-out junctions with the northwestern and southeastern sections of a residential distributor road, The Strand. The road travels through Dianella for 2.6 kilometres (1.6 mi) before reaching Reid Highway at a diamond interchange. Between there and Widgee Road/Hellenic Drive, Alexander Drive briefly borders Noranda and the City of Bayswater to the east.

After the Reid Highway interchange Alexander Drive now forms the border of the City of Stirling and Mirrabooka to the west, and the City of Swan and Malaga to the east. It reaches Beach Road 2 kilometres (1.2 mi), after which the border to the west changes to the City of Wanneroo and Koondoola. 550 metres (1,800 ft) north of there, the road intersects with Illawarra Crescent South and the border to the east becomes Ballajura. It then reaches Marangaroo Drive 1.2 kilometres (0.75 mi) later, after which the border to the west changes to Alexander Heights. It intersects with Illawarra Crescent North 1 kilometre (0.62 mi), and then Hepburn Avenue 600 metres (2,000 ft).

After Hepburn Avenue, the road now borders Landsdale to the west and Cullacabardee to the east. To the west is mostly residential areas and some bushland and farming area soon to be converted into residential development, while to the east is exclusively bushland and rural area. Alexander Drive travels along these suburbs for 2.8 kilometres (1.7 mi) before reaching Gnangara Road. This intersection marks the northern terminus of State Route 56, but not Alexander Drive, which ends at a cul-de-sac north of the intersection.

== History ==
In May 1932, the Perth Road Board (now City of Stirling) decided to rename Fitzgerald Street, north of Walcott Street, to Alexander Drive after Mr S.B. Alexander, who was a member of the Wanneroo Road Board (now City of Wanneroo). The name change was official made by the state government's Department of Lands and Surveys in September 1932. In 1939, improvement works were proposed for Alexander Drive and other roads in the area. These works included concrete kerbing, surfacing with a two coat bitumen seal, and widening from 16 feet (4.9 m) to 20 feet (6.1 m).

The north–south portion from Marangaroo Drive to Widgee Road was historically called Uganda Road and was barely more than a track, but was renamed when the dual carriageway was built in the late 1970s. The name change was made official in March 1979. The road was duplicated from Beach Road to the location of what is now the present-day Hepburn Avenue during the early 1990s, also during the time Reid Highway linked Alexander Drive to Malaga Drive; this was subsequently extended west from there.

In 2006, the original single carriageway northbound from Hepburn Ave was upgraded to a dual carriageway to Gnangara Road, where State Route 56 ends.

Traffic lights were installed at the intersection with Gnangara Road in 2007. In 2011, the original traffic light intersection with Reid Highway was upgraded to a diamond interchange. Reid Highway is now uninterrupted over traffic light junctions at Alexander Drive.

The MAX light rail system, which would run along Alexander Drive and Fitzgerald Street, was announced in 2012. The plans were modified to bus rapid transit in 2015, before being cancelled in 2016.

== Major intersections ==
View southbound from Gnangara Road

All intersections listed below are signalised unless otherwise indicated. Note that the length includes Fitzgerald Street for continuity.

| LGA | Location | km | mi | Destinations | Notes |
|---|---|---|---|---|---|
| Perth | Perth–Northbridge boundary | 0.0 | 0.0 | Roe Street – West Perth | Fitzgerald Street southern terminus |
| Perth | Northbridge | 0.1 | 0.062 | James Street | Access from Graham Farmer Freeway westbound exit |
| Perth | Northbridge | 0.3 | 0.19 | Piazza Nanni westbound / Aberdeen Street eastbound | Mitchell Freeway Principal Shared Path terminates here via Piazza Nanni. Access to St Brigid's Church parking. Southern terminus of peak hour bus lanes |
| Perth–Vincent boundary | West Perth–Northbridge–Perth tripoint | 0.5 | 0.31 | Newcastle Street – Leederville | Access to/from Mitchell Freeway to the south |
| Vincent | West Perth–Perth boundary | 0.7 | 0.43 | Carr Street westbound / Stuart Street eastbound | No through traffic between Carr and Stuart Streets. Stuart Street is left-only to Fitzgerald Street southbound and is controlled by give-way signs. No right turn permitted between Fitzgerald Street southbound to Carr Street. Access to Carr Street from Fitzgerald Street northbound via slip lane. |
| Vincent | West Perth–Perth boundary | 1.1 | 0.68 | Bulwer Street (State Route 72) – Leederville, Wembley, City Beach, Highgate | State Route 56 southern terminus |
| Vincent | West Perth–North Perth–Perth tripoint | 1.3 | 0.81 | Vincent Street – Leederville, Mount Lawley | No right turn permitted between Vincent Street east to Fitzgerald Street south. |
| Vincent | North Perth | 2.0 | 1.2 | Angove Street – Mount Hawthorn, Osborne Park | |
| Vincent–Stirling boundary | North Perth–Menora boundary | 2.7 | 1.7 | Walcott Street (State Route 75) – Mount Lawley, Osborne Park, Innaloo, Scarborough | Change of name to Alexander Drive. Northern terminus of peak hour bus lanes |
| Stirling | Menora–Mount Lawley boundary | 3.4 | 2.1 | Bradford Street | Access to Edith Cowan University Mount Lawley campus |
| Stirling | Menora–Inglewood–Mount Lawley tripoint | 3.8 | 2.4 | Central Avenue – Maylands | Access to Edith Cowan University Mount Lawley campus |
| Stirling | Dianella | 5.5 | 3.4 | Woodrow Avenue – Yokine | |
| Stirling | Dianella | 6.3 | 3.9 | Grand Promenade (State Route 55) – Bedford, Bayswater | |
| Stirling | Dianella | 6.7– 7.0 | 4.2– 4.3 | Morley Drive (State Route 76) west & east / The Strand northwest & southeast – Stirling, Karrinyup, Morley, Bedford | Hamburger roundabout with Alexander Drive splitting in two. Morley Drive is signalised while The Strand is controlled with give-way signs. Traffic typically turning right from Morley Drive onto Alexander Drive must turn left and follow roundabout first. |
| Stirling | Dianella | 7.7 | 4.8 | Light Street | |
| Stirling | Dianella | 8.3 | 5.2 | Gordon Road West | Gordon Road West westbound LILO only with access from Alexander Drive northbound via unsignalised slip lane. |
| Stirling | Dianella | 8.7 | 5.4 | Yirrigan Drive – Mirrabooka, Nollamara, Balcatta | |
| Stirling–Bayswater boundary | Dianella–Noranda boundary | 8.7 | 5.4 | Hellenic Drive westbound / Widgee Road eastbound | |
| Stirling–Swan–Bayswater tripoint | Mirrabooka–Malaga–Noranda–Dianella quadripoint | 9.5– 9.7 | 5.9– 6.0 | Reid Highway (State Route 3) – North Beach, Balcatta, Beechboro, Midland | Diamond interchange favouring Reid Highway. |
| Stirling–Swan boundary | Mirrabooka–Malaga boundary | 10.3 | 6.4 | Victoria Road | |
| Wanneroo–Swan–Stirling tripoint | Koondoola–Malaga–Mirrabooka boundary | 11.5 | 7.1 | Beach Road – Carine, Warwick, Dayton | |
| Wanneroo–Swan boundary | Koondoola–Ballajura–Malaga tripoint | 12.0 | 7.5 | Illawarra Crescent northeast bound | |
| Wanneroo–Swan boundary | Alexander Heights–Ballajura–Koondoola tripoint | 13.2 | 8.2 | Marangaroo Drive (State Route 81) – Ballajura, Girrawheen, Marangaroo | |
| Wanneroo–Swan boundary | Alexander Heights–Ballajura boundary | 14.2 | 8.8 | Illawarra Crescent southeastbound | |
| Wanneroo–Swan boundary | Landsdale–Cullacabardee–Ballajura–Alexander Heights quadripoint | 14.8 | 9.2 | Hepburn Avenue (State Route 82) – Hillarys, Greenwood, Bennett Springs, Malaga | |
| Wanneroo–Swan boundary | Gnangara–Cullacabardee–Landsdale tripoint | 17.7 | 11.0 | Gnangara Road (State Route 84) – Mullaloo, Wangara, Ellenbrook, Upper Swan | State Route 56 northern terminus |
| Wanneroo | Gnangara | 18.0 | 11.2 | Cul-de-sac | Northern terminus of Alexander Drive at Lake Gnangara lookout point |
1.000 mi = 1.609 km; 1.000 km = 0.621 mi: Concurrency terminus; Incomplete access
