= Mirrabooka Avenue =

Mirrabooka Avenue Western Australia

General information
- Type: Road
- Length: 8.3 km (5.2 mi)

Major junctions
- South end: Ravenswood Drive, Nollamara Avenue, Yirrigan Drive Westminster, Nollamara, Dianella, Mirrabooka
- Reid Highway (State Route 3); Marangaroo Drive (State Route 81)
- North end: Gnangara Road (State Route 83, Wangara, Landsdale

Location(s)
- Major suburbs: Mirrabooka, Marangaroo, Landsdale

Mirrabooka Avenue is a major north–south road located in the northern suburbs of Perth, Western Australia. It is a four-lane dual carriageway for its entire length. It mainly passes through residential areas, as well as industrial areas on the northern end of the road in Landsdale. On the southern end, it is continuous with Nollamara Avenue. On the northern end, it is continuous with Gnangara Road, which meets up with Ocean Reef Road and state route 84.

== History ==
In 2010, construction started on a diamond interchange for the junction of Reid Highway and Mirrabooka Avenue to improve safety and efficiency. Between 1999 and 2009, there were 400 crashes at the intersection, resulting in 4 fatalities and 38 serious injuries. In 2011, the work was completed.

In 2011, Mirrabooka Avenue was extended north from Hepburn Avenue to Gnangara Road, ultimately replacing Madeley Street (which was a former road that stretched from Heathfield Drive to Gnangara Road).

In March 2018, construction started on duplicating the last remaining section of single carriageway road, from Hepburn Avenue to Gnangara Road, which was completed in October 2018.

== Junction list ==
LGA	Location	km	mi	Destinations	Notes
Stirling	Westminster–Nollamara–Dianella–Mirrabooka quadripoint	0.0	0.0	Nollamara Avenue – Nollamara south / Ravenswood Drive – Westminster, Balcatta west / Yirrigan Drive – Mirrabooka, Dianella east	Mirrabooka Avenue southern terminus; Road continues south as Nollamara Avenue; Traffic light controlled intersection
Stirling	Westminster–Mirrabooka boundary	0.3	0.19	Milldale Way – Mirrabooka	Traffic light controlled t-junction
Stirling	Balga–Westminster–Mirrabooka tripoint	0.6	0.37	Reid Highway (State Route 3) – Joondalup, Morley, Kelmscott	Diamond interchange
Stirling	Balga–Mirrabooka boundary	1.2	0.75	Balga Avenue – Balga	John Septimus Roe Anglican Community School exit; Traffic light controlled intersection
Stirling–Wanneroo boundary	Balga–Mirrabooka–Girrawheen–Koondoola quadripoint	2.4	1.5	Beach Road, Perth – Duncraig, Malaga	Traffic light controlled intersection
Wanneroo	Girrawheen–Koondoola boundary	3.2	2.0	Montrose Avenue – Girrawheen west / Koondoola Avenue – Koondoola east	Roundabout controlled intersection
Wanneroo	Girrawheen–Koondoola–Marangaroo–Alexander Heights quadripoint	3.9	2.4	Marangaroo Drive (State Route 81) – Duncraig, Ballajura	Traffic light controlled intersection
Wanneroo	Marangaroo–Alexander Heights boundary	4.7	2.9	Rawlinson Drive – Marangaroo	Entrance and exit to Alexander Heights Shopping Centre; Roundabout controlled intersection
Wanneroo	Marangaroo–Alexander Heights–Darch–Landsdale quadripoint	5.6	3.5	Hepburn Avenue – Hillarys, Malaga	Roundabout controlled intersection
Wanneroo	Darch–Landsdale boundary	6.7	4.2	Kingsway – Madeley, Darch, Landsdale	Roundabout controlled intersection
Wanneroo	Landsdale–Wangara boundary	8.3	5.2	Gnangara Road (State Route 83) – Padbury, Wangara, Ellenbrook	Mirrabooka Avenue northern terminus; Road continues north as Gnangara Road; Roundabout controlled intersection
