= Koondoola, Western Australia =

Koondoola Perth, Western Australia
- Coordinates: 31.842°S 115.859°E
- Population: 4,055 (SAL 2016)
- Established: 1970s
- Postcode(s): 6064
- Area: 3.5 km^{2} (1.4 sq mi)
- Location: 15 km (9 mi) N of Perth
- LGA(s): City of Wanneroo
- State electorate(s): Mirrabooka
- Federal division(s): Cowan
Suburbs around Koondoola:
Marangaroo	Alexander Heights	Ballajura
Girrawheen	Koondoola	Ballajura
Balga	Mirrabooka	Malaga

Koondoola is a suburb of Perth, Western Australia, located within the City of Wanneroo. Its postcode is 6064.

Most of Koondoola's infrastructure was built in the 1970s. For example, two of the area's focal points, Koondoola Primary School and Koondoola Plaza, were built in 1975 and 1978 respectively. Prior to the 1970s a large portion of Koondoola had been a regional landfill facility.

Also in Koondoola is the small but progressive Waddington Primary School, overlooking local bushland.

Koondoola, like much of the northern suburbs, has a history of sporting clubs. In 1975 Koondoola Junior Football Club was formed, followed two years later by Koondoola Junior Soccer Club (1977). Similarly around this time Koondoola Junior Cricket Club was formed. Koondoola Junior Football Club had its grounds located at Koondoola Park, as did Koondoola Junior Cricket Club. Both clubs have since merged with Girrawheen. Koondoola Junior Soccer Club was first located at Butterworth Reserve, but moved to Shelvock Reserve in 1983. This was the club's final year of operation.

The suburb has a large bushland preserve which has seen major bushfires as recently as 2012 and 2021.

== Transport ==
=== Bus ===
- 360 Alexander Heights Shopping Centre to Perth Busport (limited stops) – serves Marangaroo Drive
- 361 Alexander Heights Shopping Centre to Perth Busport (limited stops) – serves Alexander Drive
- 376 Whitfords Station to Mirrabooka Bus Station – serves Mirrabooka Avenue
- 377 Alexander Heights Shopping Centre to Mirrabooka Bus Station – serves Marangaroo Drive, Koondoola Avenue, Burbridge Avenue, Butterworth Avenue and Beach Road
- 449 Warwick Station to Malaga – serves Beach Road
