= Marangaroo, Western Australia =

Marangaroo
- Suburb
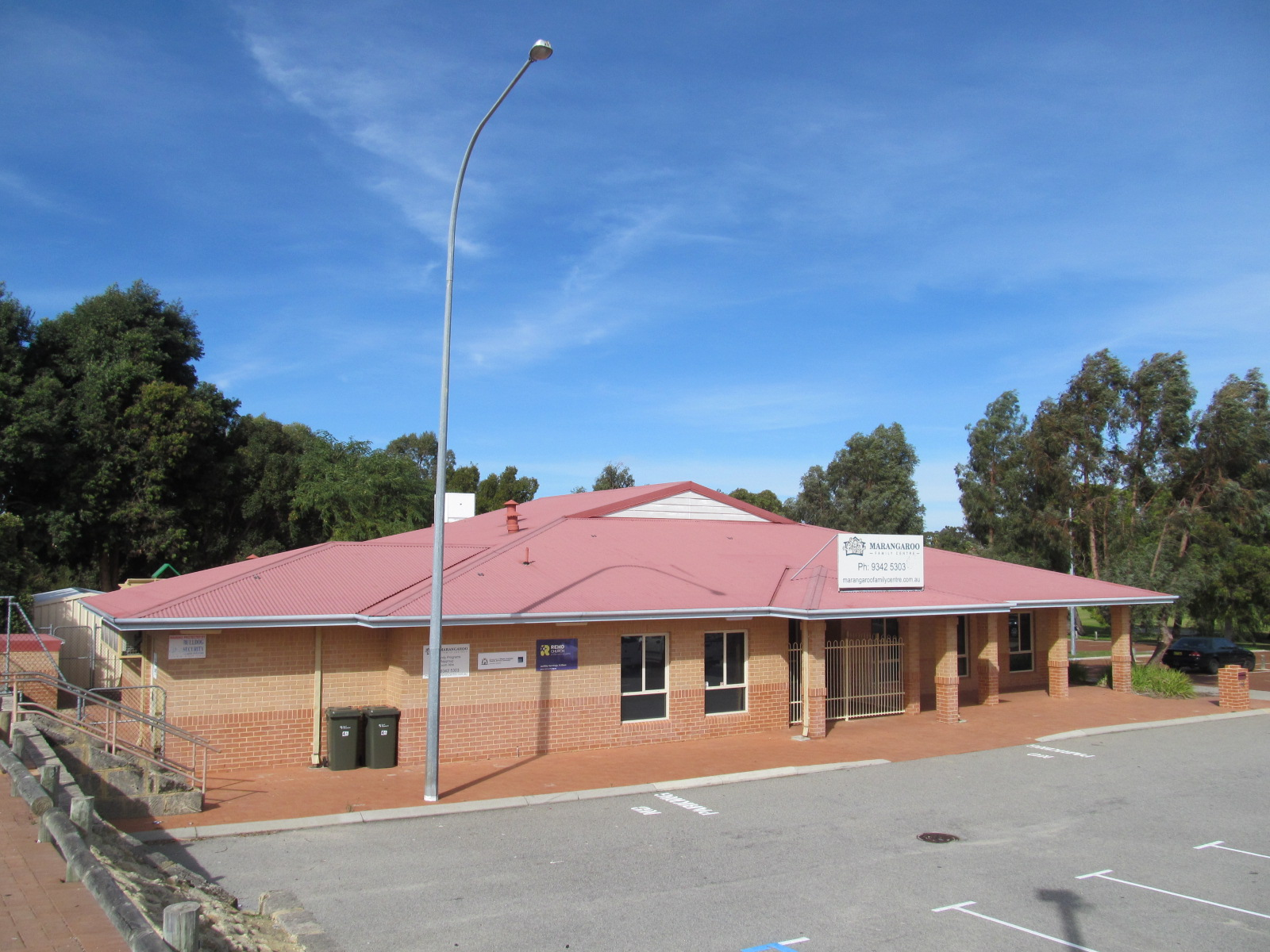
- Marangaroo Family Centre on Highclere Boulevard
- Interactive map of Marangaroo
- Coordinates: 31.828°S 115.836°E
- Country: Australia
- State: Western Australia
- City: Perth
- LGA: City of Wanneroo
- Location: 18 km (11 mi) from Perth City

Government
  - State electorate: Mirrabooka
  - Federal division: Cowan

Area
  - Total: 4.8 km^{2} (1.9 sq mi)

Population
  - Total: 10,483 (SAL 2021)
- Postcode: 6064
Suburbs around Marangaroo
| Kingsley | Madeley | Landsdale |
| Greenwood | Marangaroo | Alexander Heights |
| Warwick | Girrawheen | Koondoola |

Marangaroo is a suburb of Perth, Western Australia. It is located approximately 18 kilometres (11 mi) north of Perth City, within the City of Wanneroo. Marangaroo's borders comprise Wanneroo Road, Hepburn Avenue, Mirrabooka Avenue and Marangaroo Drive.

Marangaroo means place of blue flowers in the local Aboriginal language. It is home to the Marangaroo Golf Course and two primary schools – Marangaroo Primary School which was established in 1987 and Rawlinson Primary School which was established in 2003.

Paralympic athlete Sarah Edmiston is from Marangaroo.

== Transport ==
=== Bus ===
- 374 Whitfords Station to Mirrabooka Bus Station – serves Highclere Boulevard and Marangaroo Drive
- 375 Alexander Heights Shopping Centre to Mirrabooka Bus Station – serves Mirrabooka Avenue and Jefferson Drive
- 386 Kingsway City to Perth Busport – serves Hepburn Avenue, Highclere Boulevard and Marangaroo Drive
- 386X Kingsway City to Perth Busport (limited stops) – serves Hepburn Avenue, Highclere Boulevard and Marangaroo Drive
- 389 Wanneroo to Perth Busport – serves Wanneroo Road
- 448 Warwick Station to Kingsway City – serves Giralt Road and Marangaroo Drive
- 450 Warwick Station to Ballajura Station – serves Wanneroo Road
- 451 Warwick Station to Ballajura Station – serves Marangaroo Drive and Mirrabooka Avenue

Bus routes serving Mirrabooka Avenue:

- 360 Alexander Heights Shopping Centre to Perth Busport (limited stops)
- 361 Alexander Heights Shopping Centre to Galleria Bus Station
- 377 Alexander Heights Shopping Centre to Mirrabooka Bus Station
- 452 Whitfords Station to Ballajura Station
- 970 Landsdale to Perth Busport (high frequency)
- 970X Landsdale to Perth Busport (high frequency / limited stops)
