= Ballajura, Western Australia =

Suburb of Perth, Western Australia

Ballajura
- Suburb
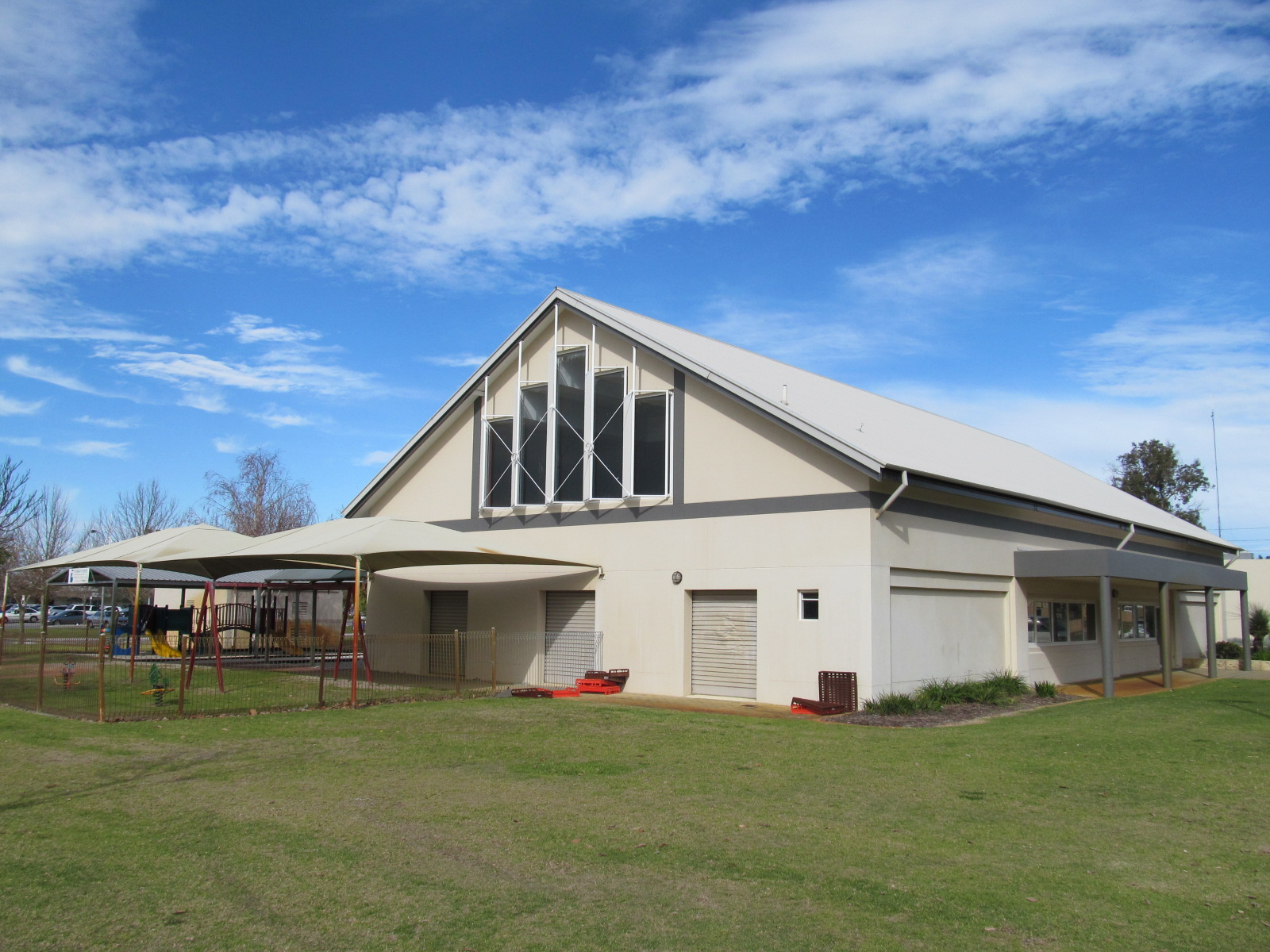
- Kingfisher CHC adjacent to the Ballajura Library in Ballajura
- Interactive map of Ballajura
- Coordinates: 31.840°S 115.895°E
- Country: Australia
- State: Western Australia
- City: Perth
- LGA: City of Swan

Government
  - State electorate: West Swan
  - Federal division: Division of Cowan

Area
  - Total: 8.9 km^{2} (3.4 sq mi)

Population
  - Total: 18,459 (SAL 2021)
- Postcode: 6066
Suburbs around Ballajura
| Landsdale | Cullacabardee | Cullacabardee |
| Alexander Heights and Koondoola | Ballajura | Whiteman |
| Malaga | Malaga | Beechboro |

Ballajura is a suburb of Perth, Western Australia, in the City of Swan local government area. Ballajura is located 14 kilometres (8.7 mi) north of the Perth central business district. Situated on its side of its western boundary with Koondoola is Emu Swamp.

== History ==
The Ballajura area was first settled in 1905, when Ernest Maltby Kerruish, an immigrant from the Isle of Man, purchased land for a farm at the present site, which at the time was located in Caversham. He named it Ballajora, after a farm at Maughold on the Isle of Man. John Creer and Arthur Eaton, who also emigrated with Kerruish from the Isle of Man, joined him in clearing the land to build a house and begin farming the land. After a few years, Kerruish decided the soil was not fertile enough and moved his operations to an established vineyard in the present-day Caversham area, a few kilometres southeast.

The names Kerruish, Eaton, and Creer have been given to three of the four houses of Ballajura Primary School. The fourth is named after Matilda Bennett, a woman also of Manx descent who was the wife of John Septimus Roe, the first surveyor general of Western Australia. Bennett Brook, a stream which ran through the Ballajora farm, was also named after Matilda Bennett.

The suburb was further developed in the 1980s with the development of two sub-divisions of Lakeshore and the Lakes Estate both becoming sought-after locations. Built around lakes and parks, they attracted a high quality of homes with the median price of housing within the subdivisions attracting prices 75–100% higher than of the rest of Ballajura. A proposal to officially rename the subdivisions was opposed by members of the local council, who expressed concerns that it would impact negatively on the remaining areas of Ballajura.

== Community ==
In the 2016 census of Population and Housing by the Australian Bureau of Statistics, the population of the Ballajura postcode area was 18,704, in an area of 8.9 square kilometres (3.4 sq mi). Australian-born residents accounted for 59% of the population.

The suburb has four primary schools (Ballajura, South Ballajura, Illawarra, and Mary MacKillop Catholic Primary School) and one high school (Ballajura Community College). No railway line directly serves the Ballajura area, though the suburb has several local bus services straight to the city and is served by the Ballajura railway station in the neighbouring suburb of Whiteman as part of the Ellenbrook line.

== Transport ==
=== Bus ===
- 351 Ballajura Station to Galleria Bus Station – serves Bellefin Drive
- 360 Alexander Heights Shopping Centre to Perth Busport (limited stops) – serves Alexander Drive, Illawarra Crescent and Marangaroo Drive
- 361 Alexander Heights Shopping Centre to Galleria Bus Station – serves Alexander Drive and Illawarra Crescent
- 362 Ballajura Station to Mirrabooka Bus Station – serves Guadalupe Drive, Hamelin Drive, Giralia Parkway, Bellefin Drive, Cassowary Drive and Illawarra Crescent
- 450 Ballajura Station to Warwick Station – serves Alexander Drive
- 451 Ballajura Station to Warwick Station – serves Bellefin Drive, Pelican Parade, Shearwater Terrace, Illawarra Crescent and Alexander Drive
- 452 Ballajura Station to Whitfords Station – serves Bellefin Drive, Pelican Parade, Shearwater Terrace, Illawarra Crescent and Marangaroo Drive

== General references ==
- Illawarra Primary School
