= Alexander Heights, Western Australia =

Alexander Heights Perth, Western Australia
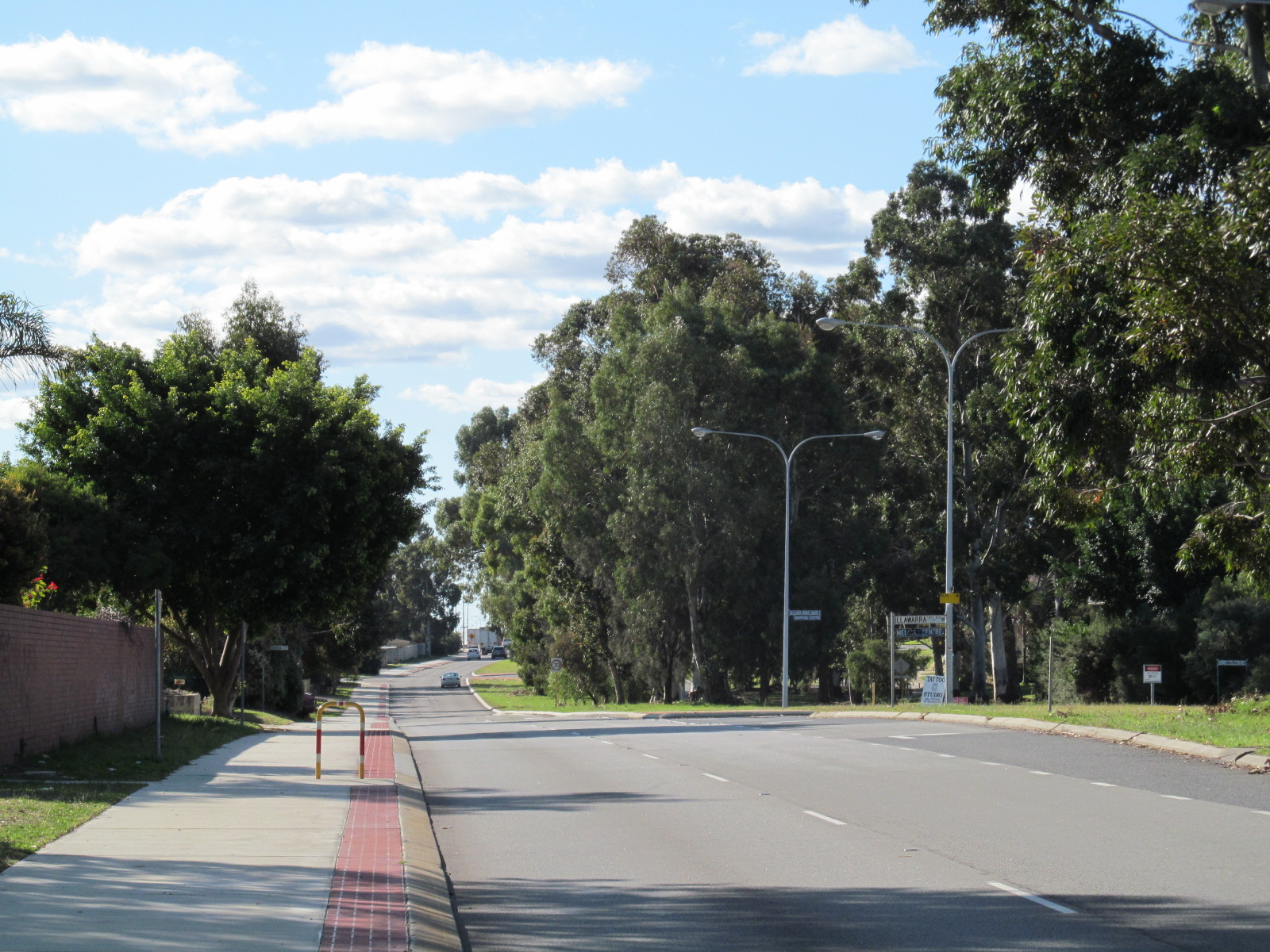
- Alexander Drive looking north from near Illawarra Crescent (N), Alexander Heights, Western Australia.
- Coordinates: 31.827°S 115.871°E
- Population: 7,772 (SAL 2021)
- Established: 1980s
- Postcode(s): 6064
- Area: 3.2 km^{2} (1.2 sq mi)
- Location: 14 km (9 mi) NNE of Perth CBD
- LGA(s): City of Wanneroo
- State electorate(s): Girrawheen
- Federal division(s): Cowan
Suburbs around Alexander Heights:
Darch	Landsdale	Cullacabardee
Marangaroo	Alexander Heights	Ballajura
Girrawheen	Koondoola	Ballajura

Alexander Heights is a suburb of Perth, Western Australia within the City of Wanneroo.

Originally named in 1977 as "Alinjarra", an Aboriginal word for "north", this suburb was renamed Alexander Heights in 1987. The name is derived from Alexander Drive, the main arterial road into the area, which forms the suburb's eastern boundary. The road was in turn named after Mr S.B. Alexander, a former Wanneroo Road Board member.

The suburb contains the Alinjarra Primary School, which covers from kindergarten to year 6. It hosts a range of sports programs and English courses to help the large number of recent immigrants, mostly of African, Arabic, Irish or English descent, moving into the area.

== Transport ==
The suburb is linked to the Perth CBD by the 360 Transperth bus route that run between Perth Busport and Alexander Heights Shopping Centre on Mirrabooka Avenue on the west side of the suburb. The 451 bus route also connects the suburb with Warwick railway station, while the 361 bus route connects to Galleria Bus Station.

=== Bus ===
- 451 Warwick Station to Ballajura Station (via Alexander Heights) – serves Mirrabooka Avenue, Errina Road, Azelia Street, The Avenue, Whitcombe Way, Greenpark Road and Alexander Drive
- 360 Alexander Heights Shopping Centre to Perth Busport (limited stops) – serves Mirrabooka Avenue and Marangaroo Drive
- 361 Alexander Heights Shopping Centre to Galleria Bus Station (limited stops) – serves Mirrabooka Avenue, Griffon Way, Hillcrest Road, Errina Road, Azelia Street, The Avenue, Whitcombe Way, Greenpark Road and Alexander Drive
- 375 Alexander Heights Shopping Centre to Mirrabooka Bus Station – serves Mirrabooka Avenue, Griffon Way, Hillcrest Road and Errina Road
- 376 Whitfords Station to Mirrabooka Bus Station – serves Mirrabooka Avenue
- 377 Alexander Heights Shopping Centre to Mirrabooka Bus Station – serves Mirrabooka Avenue and Marangaroo Drive
- 378 Alexander Heights to Mirrabooka Bus Station – serves Northumberland Avenue, Cromwell Road, The Avenue, Greenpark Road and Alexander Drive
