= Mirrabooka, Western Australia =

Mirrabooka
- Suburb
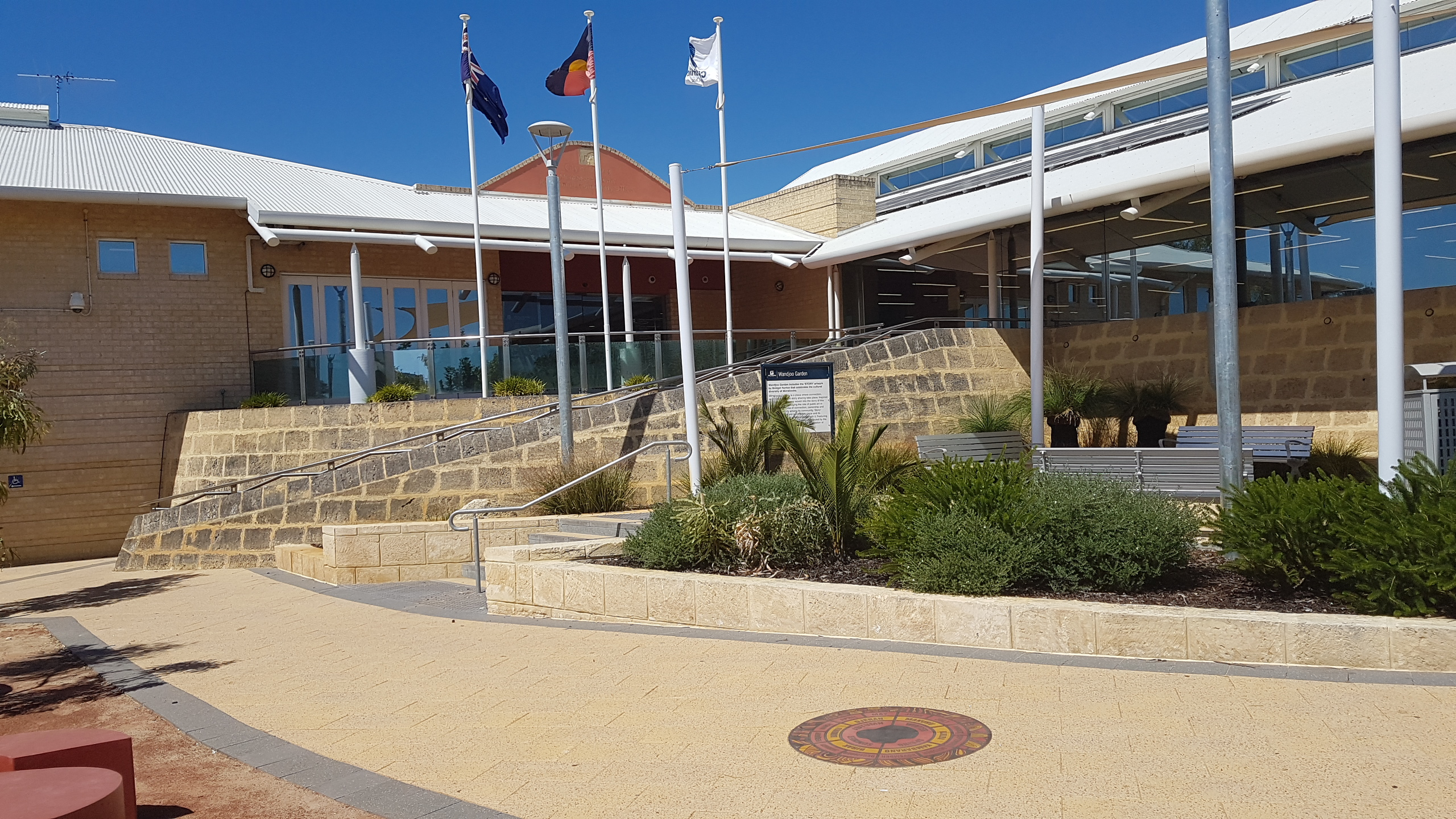
- Mirrabooka library
- Interactive map of Mirrabooka
- Coordinates: 31.863°S 115.87°E
- Country: Australia
- State: Western Australia
- City: Perth
- LGA: City of Stirling
- Location: 12 km (7.5 mi) N of Perth CBD
- Established: 1954

Government
  - State electorate: Mirrabooka
  - Federal division: Cowan

Area
  - Total: 5.0 km^{2} (1.9 sq mi)

Population
  - Total: 8,000 (SAL 2021)
- Postcode: 6061
Suburbs around Mirrabooka
Girrawheen	Koondoola	Malaga
Balga	Mirrabooka	Malaga
Westminster and Nollamara	Dianella	Noranda

Mirrabooka is a suburb of Perth, Western Australia. Its local government area is the City of Stirling. At the 2021 census it had a population of 8,000 people.

== History ==
The name "Mirrabooka" is not a Noongar word, but comes from an eastern states Indigenous language and the town of Mirrabooka, New South Wales. It is cited as a local name for the Southern Cross constellation.

The name "Mirrabooka" was originally applied to the Mirrabooka Project in the early 1950s, which was planned to be a satellite city of Perth housing up to 60,000 people and linked with the nearby Balcatta light industrial area. The project area comprised three suburbs: Balga, Nollamara, and Yirrigan. The suburb of Yirrigan was never fully developed and remained largely bushland, and was renamed Mirrabooka in 1980.

In the early stages of development of the suburb, it was originally considered as an extension of Girrawheen, and Nollamara. In the 1980s and 1990s the suburb expanded rapidly with the subdivision of bushland, on which housing developments have been built, especially north of Yirrigan Drive.

The Mirrabooka Square shopping centre, which originally opened in 1979, has since received a number of expansions. A police station near the shopping centre was opened in 1998, and was expanded in 2015.

== Transport ==
The suburb is home to the Mirrabooka bus station, a hub for bus transport in the area, and is served by a number of Transperth bus routes operated by Path Transit and Swan Transit, including connections to Perth, Warwick railway station and Stirling.

For the part north of Reid Highway, the western end on Mirrabooka Avenue is covered by routes 374, 970 and 970X (during peak) . Route 377 runs on Honeywell Boulevard, and route 362 and 363 runs on Australis Avenue; the eastern end on Alexander Drive is covered by routes 360, 361 and 362; the northern end on Beach Road is covered by route 449. All of these services are operated by Path Transit except route 374, which is operated by Swan Transit.

=== Bus ===
==== Bus stations ====
- Mirrabooka Bus Station

==== Bus routes ====
- 67 Mirrabooka Bus Station to Perth Busport – serves Yirrigan Drive
- 68 Mirrabooka Bus Station to Perth Busport – serves Chesterfield Road and Northwood Drive
- 350 Mirrabooka Bus Station to Caversham – serves Chesterfield Road and Northwood Drive
- 360 Alexander Heights Shopping Centre to Perth Busport (limited stops) – serves Alexander Drive
- 361 Alexander Heights Shopping Centre to Galleria Bus Station – serves Alexander Drive
- 362 Mirrabooka Bus Station to Ballajura Station – serves Chesterfield Road, Northwood Drive, Australis Avenue and Alexander Drive
- 363 Mirrabooka Bus Station to Ballajura Station – serves Chesterfield Road, Northwood Drive and Australis Avenue
- 374 Mirrabooka Bus Station to Whitfords Station – serves Milldale Way and Mirrabooka Avenue
- 375 Mirrabooka Bus Station to Alexander Heights Shopping Centre
- 377 Mirrabooka Bus Station to Alexander Heights Shopping Centre – serves Chesterfield Road, Northwood Drive, Boyare Avenue, Honeywell Boulevard and Beach Road
- 449 Warwick Station to Ballajura Station – serves Beach Road
- 960 Mirrabooka Bus Station to Curtin University Bus Station (high frequency) – serves Yirrigan Drive
- 970 Landsdale to Perth Busport (high frequency) – serves Mirrabooka Avenue, Milldale Way, Mirrabooka Bus Station and Chesterfield Road
- 970X Landsdale to Perth Busport (high frequency / limited stops) – serves Mirrabooka Avenue, Milldale Way, Mirrabooka Bus Station and Chesterfield Road
- 975 Warwick Station to Bayswater Station (high frequency) – serves Yirrigan Drive, Mirrabooka Bus Station and Chesterfield Road

Bus routes serving Chesterfield Road:

- 371 Mirrabooka Bus Station to Flinders Square
- 384 Mirrabooka Bus Station to Perth Busport
- 415 Mirrabooka Bus Station to Stirling Station
- 416 Mirrabooka Bus Station to Warwick Station

== Schools ==
- Boyare Primary School (1991)
- Dryandra Primary School (1989)
- John Septimus Roe Anglican Community School (1990)
