= Warwick, Western Australia =

Warwick Perth, Western Australia
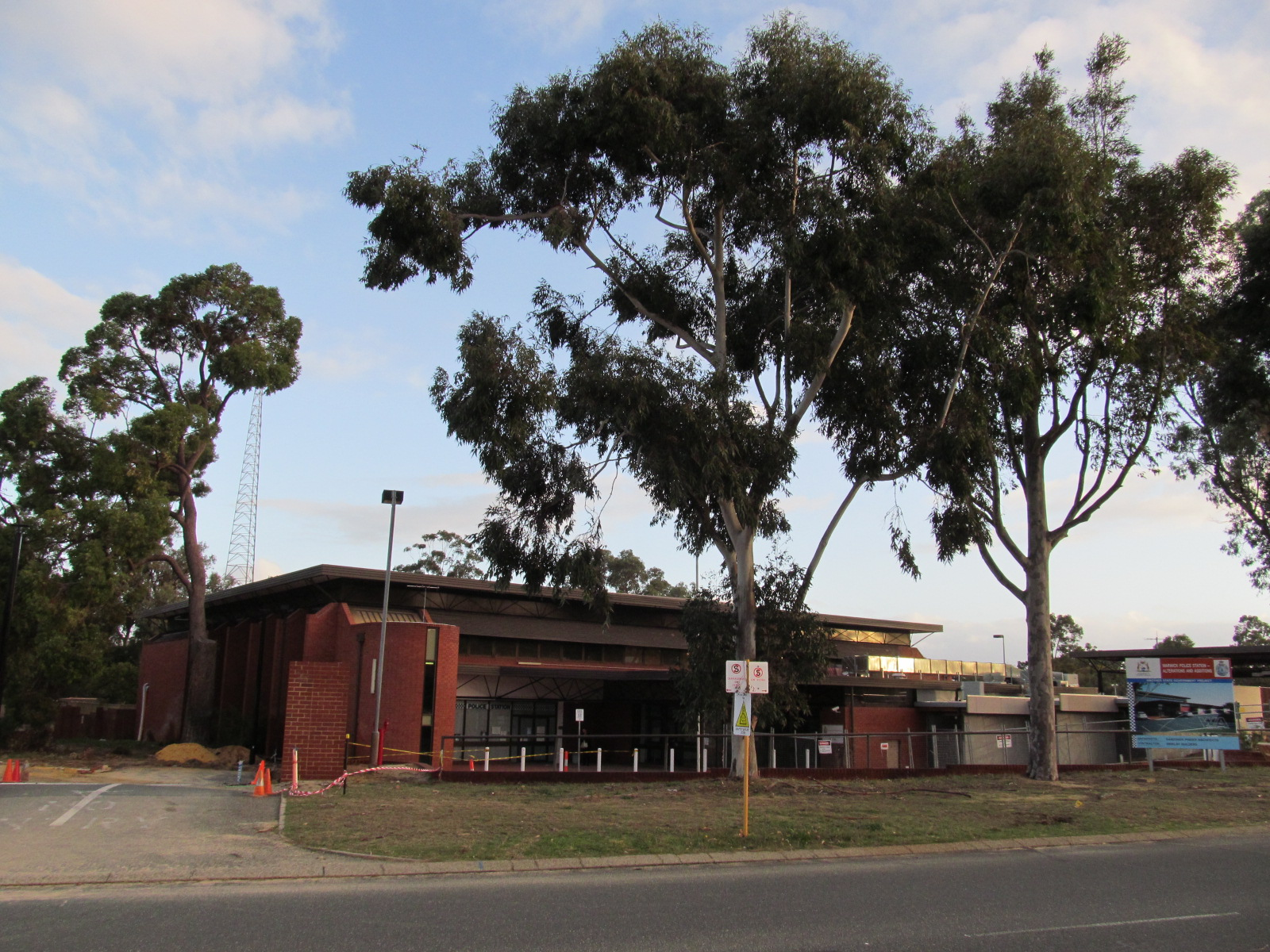
- Police station at Warwick
- Coordinates: 31.839°S 115.809°E
- Population: 3,858 (SAL 2021)
- Established: 1969
- Postcode(s): 6024
- Area: 3.1 km^{2} (1.2 sq mi)
- Location: 16 km (10 mi) NNW of the Perth CBD
- LGA(s): City of Joondalup
- State electorate(s): Kingsley
- Federal division(s): Cowan
Suburbs around Warwick:
Duncraig	Greenwood	Marangaroo
Duncraig	Warwick	Girrawheen
Carine	Hamersley	Balga

Warwick is a suburb of Perth, Western Australia, within the City of Joondalup. Its postcode is 6024. The eastern third of the suburb is a native bushland area known as the Warwick Open Space.

== History ==
Warwick was developed in the late 1960s. The Warwick Grove Shopping Centre was built in 1974. Warwick Senior High School was founded in 1981.

== Sport ==
The district is represented at Australian rules football by Warwick Greenwood Knights Junior Football Club. Basketball is played out of Warwick Stadium, which is hosted by the Warwick Senators and the Churches of Christ Sport & Recreation Association.

== Transport ==
The Warwick train station was commissioned in 1993. The suburb is also served by Transperth bus services operated by Path Transit and Swan Transit, including routes to Stirling and Whitfords train stations, Landsdale, Mirrabooka and Morley bus stations, and central Perth.
