= Malaga, Western Australia =

Malaga
- Suburb
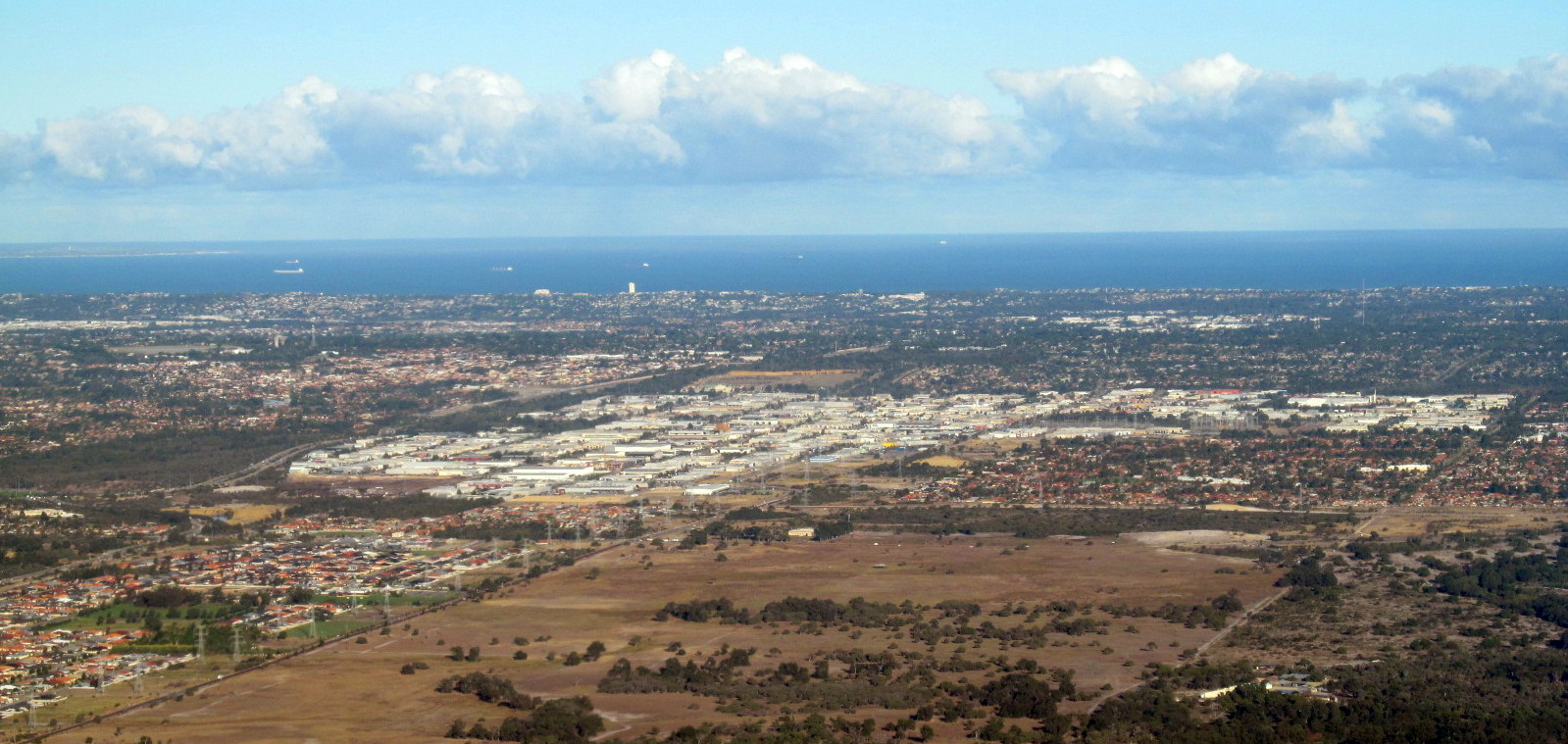
- Aerial view of Malaga from the north-east
- Interactive map of Malaga
- Coordinates: 31.860°S 115.893°E
- Country: Australia
- State: Western Australia
- City: Perth
- LGA: City of Swan

Government
  - State electorate: West Swan
  - Federal division: Division of Cowan

Area
  - Total: 6.6 km^{2} (2.5 sq mi)

Population
  - Total: 25 (SAL 2021)
- Postcode: 6090
Suburbs around Malaga
Koondoola	Ballajura	Whiteman
Mirrabooka	Malaga	Bennett Springs
Dianella	Noranda	Beechboro

Malaga (/məˈlɑːɡə/) is a suburb of Perth, Western Australia, approximately 11 kilometres (7 mi) north of the CBD, in the City of Swan.

Early real estate development occurred in the decade before the First World War.

== Etymology ==
The suburb is thought to be named after either the Spanish city of Málaga, or the Aboriginal word malaga, which means "ironstone". The name was approved in 1969.

== Demographics ==
Malaga is an industrial precinct. In 2008 there were 2409 businesses with a workforce of over 12,000 people. The 2006 census listed only 28 people living in the suburb.

== Commerce and industry ==
The Malaga Markets, a weekend market and food hall, opened in 1994. The suburb also contains Perth Ice Arena, the only indoor ice rink north of the Swan River.

The suburb contains a Transperth bus depot that opened in December 1986. In 2025, it was the first bus depot in Perth to be upgraded to operate a large fleet of electric buses. In April 1999, Volgren opened a bus building plant that has bodied over 2,000 Transperth buses.

A screen production facility, Perth Film Studios, is located in neighbouring Whiteman; due to its proximity to the suburb it is sometimes erroneously reported to be located in Malaga.

== Transport ==
=== Bus ===
- 351 Ballajura station to Galleria bus station – serves Marshall Road and Malaga Drive
- 360 Alexander Heights Shopping Centre to Perth Busport (limited stops) – serves Alexander Drive
- 361 Alexander Heights Shopping Centre to Galleria bus station – serves Illawarra Crescent and Alexander Drive
- 362 Ballajura station to Mirrabooka bus station – serves Marshall Road, Guadalupe Drive, Cassowary Drive, Illawarra Crescent and Alexander Drive
- 363 Ballajura station to Mirrabooka bus station – serves Marshall Road, Beringarra Avenue, Narloo Street and Victoria Road
- 449 Ballajura station to Warwick station – serves Marshall Road and Beach Road
- 450 Ballajura station to Warwick station – serves Marshall Road, Beach Road and Alexander Drive
