= Landsdale, Western Australia =

Landsdale
- Suburb
- Interactive map of Landsdale
- Coordinates: 31.809°S 115.839°E
- Country: Australia
- State: Western Australia
- City: Perth
- LGA: City of Wanneroo

Government
  - State electorate: Landsdale
  - Federal division: Pearce

Area
  - Total: 8.5 km^{2} (3.3 sq mi)

Population
  - Total: 15,401 (SAL 2021)
- Postcode: 6065
Suburbs around Landsdale
Wangara	Gnangara	Gnangara
Darch	Landsdale	Cullacabardee
Marangaroo	Alexander Heights	Ballajura

Landsdale is a northern suburb of Perth, Western Australia located within the local government area of the City of Wanneroo. It is mixed use, with residential, commercial and light manufacturing areas.

== History ==
In the late 1990s, Landsdale began to develop from market gardens and small rural lots into residential development. Until 1997–1998, prior to the separation by the City of Wanneroo of the suburbs of Darch and Madeley, Landsdale enclosed a much larger area extending westwards to Wanneroo Road.

== Facilities ==
The main commercial precinct is known as Landsdale Gardens and includes most of the facilities of the area, such as a small medical complex, the Warradale centre (named after Warradale Park at Southmead Drive), parks and reserves, lakes, walking trails, Landsdale Forum shopping centre.

The Warradale Centre is used for community events and includes a club room and change rooms as well as a canteen, parking and toilet facilities. It is used for local sporting clubs including the Kingsway Rockets football club, the Landsdale Lions Junior and Senior cricket club as well as a small tee ball club.

Landsdale also has an ambulance station located at the corner of Alexander Drive and Gnangara Road.

The Perth International Telecommunications Centre is located in the eastern end of Landsdale.

== Schools ==
Landsdale has three primary schools and one high school; one in the south called Carnaby Rise Primary School, one in the centre called Landsdale Primary School, and Landsdale Gardens Primary School, which opened on 1 February 2023. The only high school is Landsdale Christian School.

== Transport ==
=== Bus ===
- 450 Ballajura Station to Warwick Station – serves Pomodora Avenue and Kingsway
- 452 Ballajura Station to Whitfords Station – serves Rangeview Road, Kingsway, Alhambra Parkway, Huntington Parkway, Coverwood Promenade and Gnangara Road
- 455 Ellenbrook Station to Whitfords Station – serves Gnangara Road
- 970 Landsdale to Perth Busport (high frequency) – serves Gnangara Road, Coverwood Promenade, Warradale Terrace, Southmead Drive, The Broadview, Abbotswood Drive, Kingsway and Mirrabooka Avenue
- 970X Landsdale to Perth Busport (high frequency / limited stops) – serves Gnangara Road, Coverwood Promenade, Warradale Terrace, Southmead Drive, The Broadview, Abbotswood Drive, Kingsway and Mirrabooka Avenue
