= Mirrabooka bus station =

Bus station in Mirrabooka, Australia

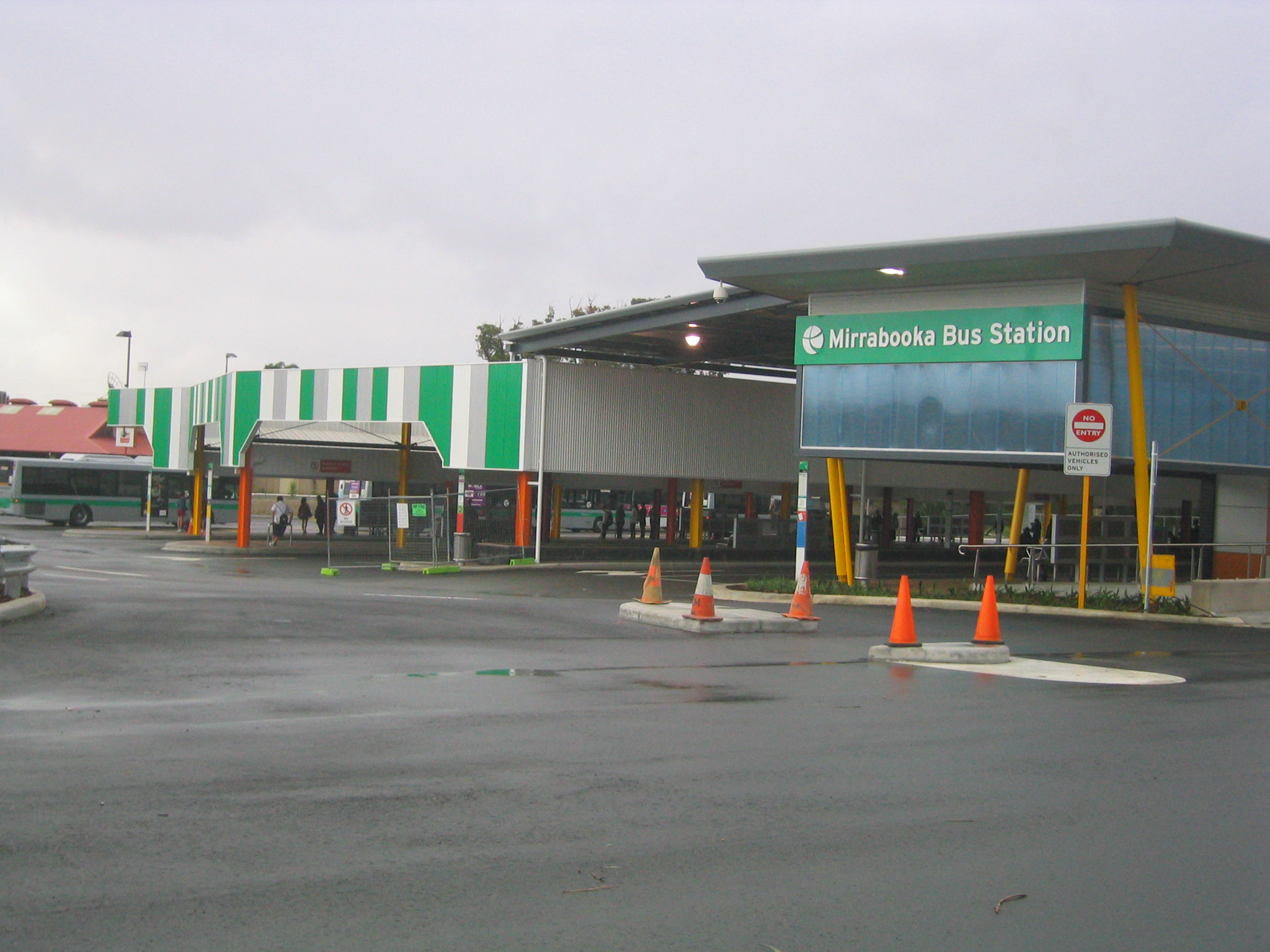

General information
- Location: Chesterfield Road, Mirrabooka; Western Australia; Australia
- Coordinates: 31°52′12″S 115°51′31″E
- Owner: Public Transport Authority
- Operator: Transperth
- Bus routes: 15
- Bus stands: 12

Other information
- Fare zone: 2

History
- Opened: 1970s
- Rebuilt: 13 December 2010
Location

Mirrabooka bus station is a Transperth bus station in Mirrabooka approximately 12 kilometres north of Perth, Western Australia. It has 12 stands and is served by 14 Transperth routes operated by Path Transit and Swan Transit.

== History ==
The original Mirrabooka bus station opened in September 1979. It was upgraded in February 1983. It was refurbished in 1996, before being partially demolished and expanded in 2010, reopening on 13 December 2010.

== Bus routes ==
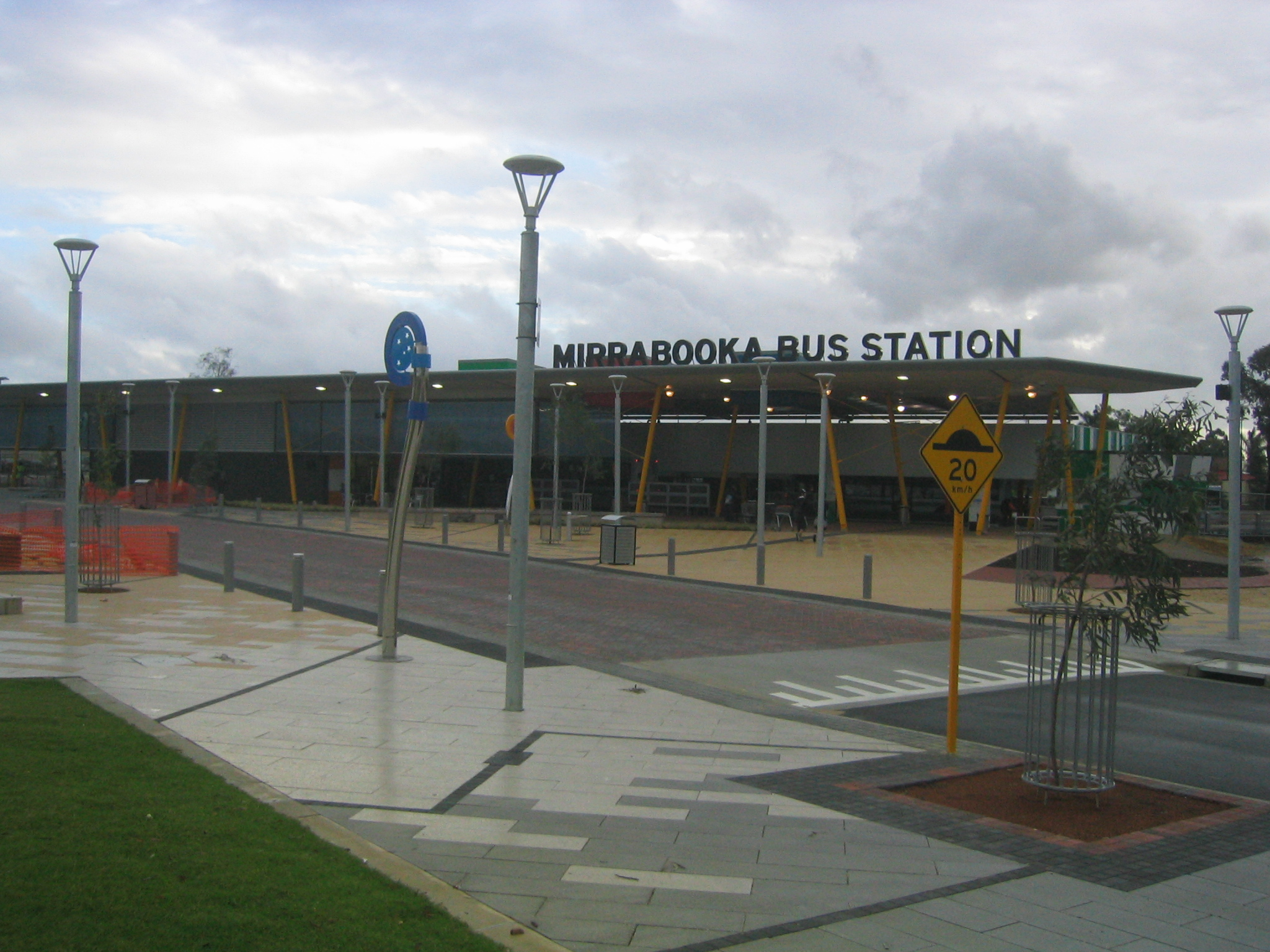
Pedestrian entrance in June 2011

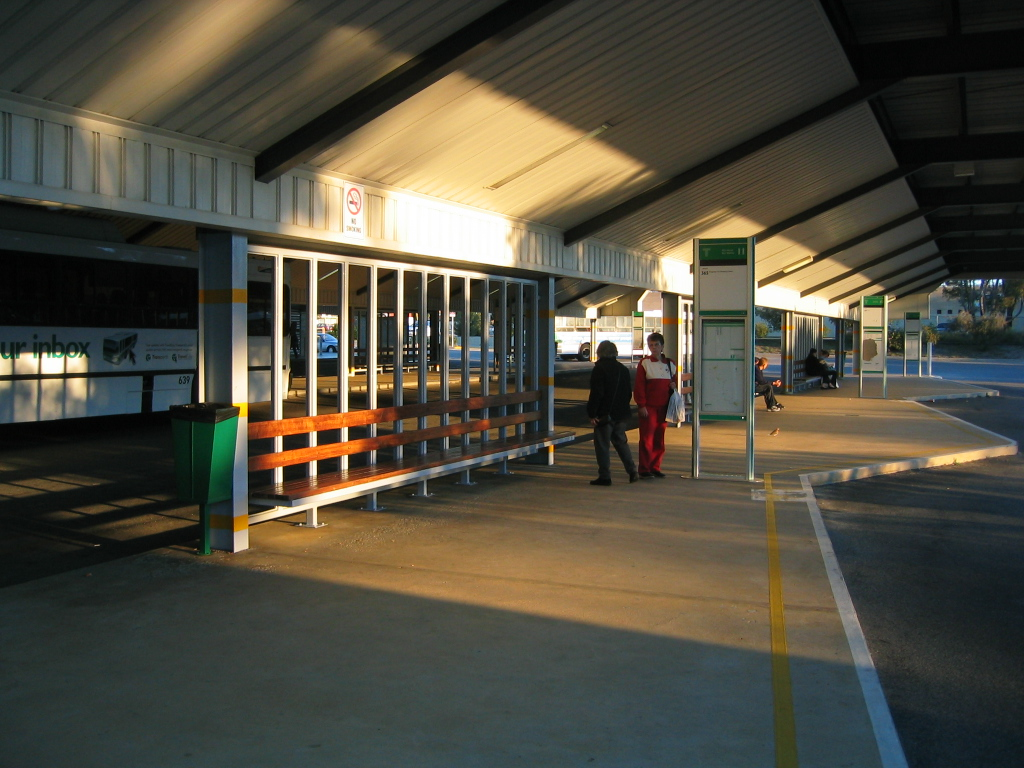
Mirrabooka bus station in July 2005

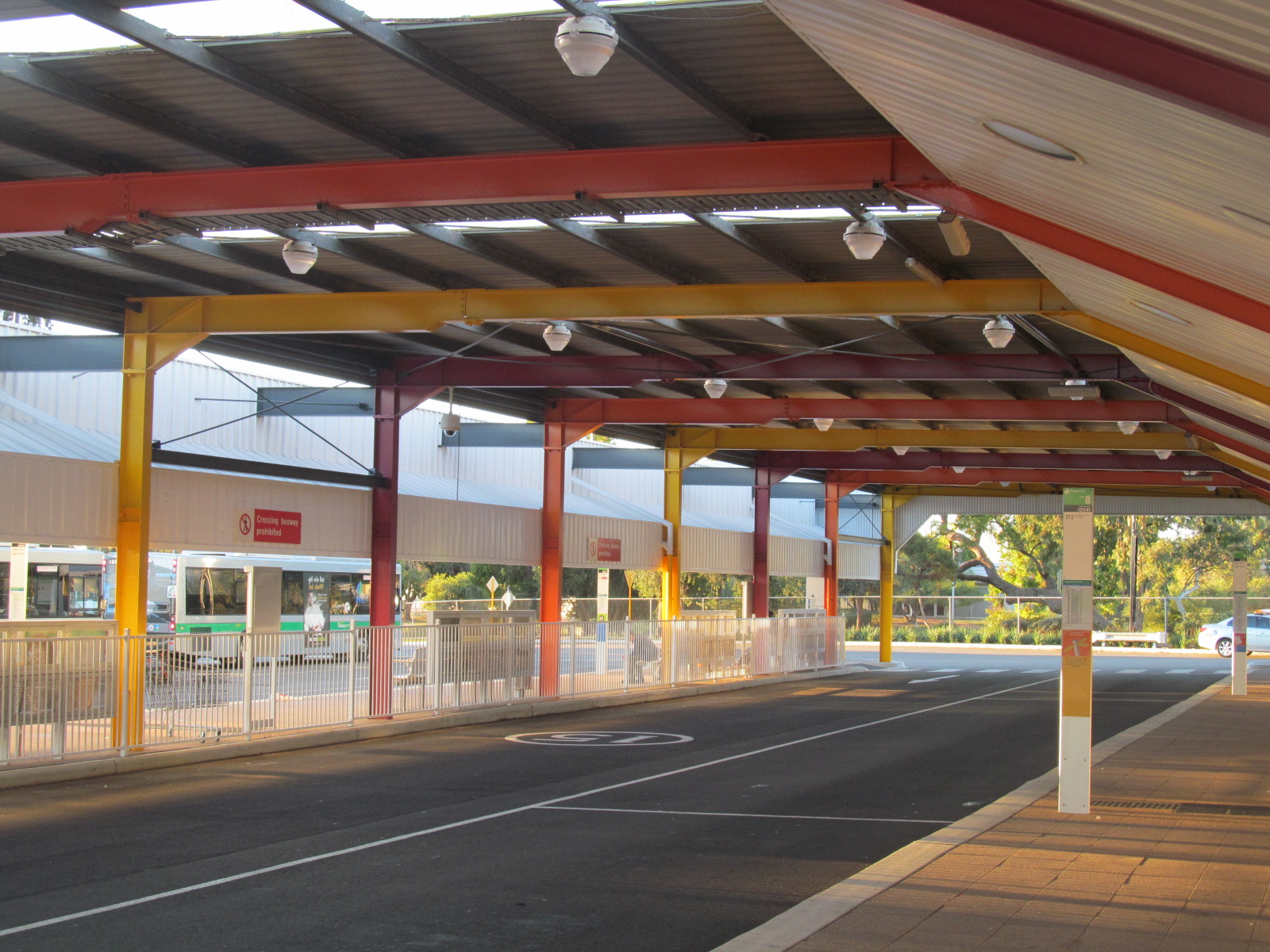
Interior in May 2012

=== Road A ===
Stop	Route	Destination / description	Notes
Stand 1	970	Perth Busport via Nollamara Avenue, Flinders Street & Charles Street	High frequency
Stand 1	970X	Perth Busport via Nollamara Avenue, Flinders Street & Charles Street	Limited stops
Stand 2	371	Flinders Square, Yokine via Ravenswood Drive, Nollamara Shopping Centre & Flinders Street	
Stand 2	384	Perth Busport via Ravenswood Drive, Wanneroo Road & Charles Street	
Stand 3	960	Curtin University Bus Station via Alexander Drive, Edith Cowan University Mount Lawley & Perth Busport	High frequency

=== Road B ===
Stop	Route	Destination / description	Notes
Stand 4	374	Whitfords Station via Girrawheen Avenue and Madeley	Selected services terminating in Darch
Stand 5	375	Alexander Heights Shopping Centre via Finchley Crescent, Hainsworth Avenue & Jefferson Drive	
Stand 6	970, 970X	Whitfords Station via Mirrabooka Avenue, The Broadview & Gnangara Road	High frequency

=== Road C ===
Stop	Route	Destination / description	Notes
Stand 7	975	Warwick station via Ravenswood Drive, Marloo Road, Princess Road, Culloton Crescent & Beach Road	
Stand 8	362	Ballajura Station via Cassowary Drive & Guadalupe Drive	
Stand 8	363	Ballajura Station via Victoria Road & Beringarra Avenue	
Stand 8	415	Stirling station via Ravenswood Drive & Amelia Street	
Stand 9	377	Alexander Heights via Honeywell Boulevard & Burbridge Avenue	

=== Road D ===
Stop	Route	Destination / description	Notes
Stand 10	975	Bayswater Station via Wellington Road, Galleria bus station & Beechboro Road South	
Stand 11	416	Warwick station via Balcatta Road & Eglinton Crescent	
Stand 11	652	Perth Stadium via Dianella Drive & Alexander Drive	Limited stops special event services
Stand 12	67	Perth Busport via Dianella Drive, Grand Promenade & Beaufort Street	
Stand 12	68	Perth Busport via Northwood Drive, The Strand, Lennard Street & Beaufort Street	
Stand 12	682	Crown Perth, Burswood via Dianella & Morley	
