= Warwick railway station, Perth =

Railway station in Perth, Western Australia

Warwick
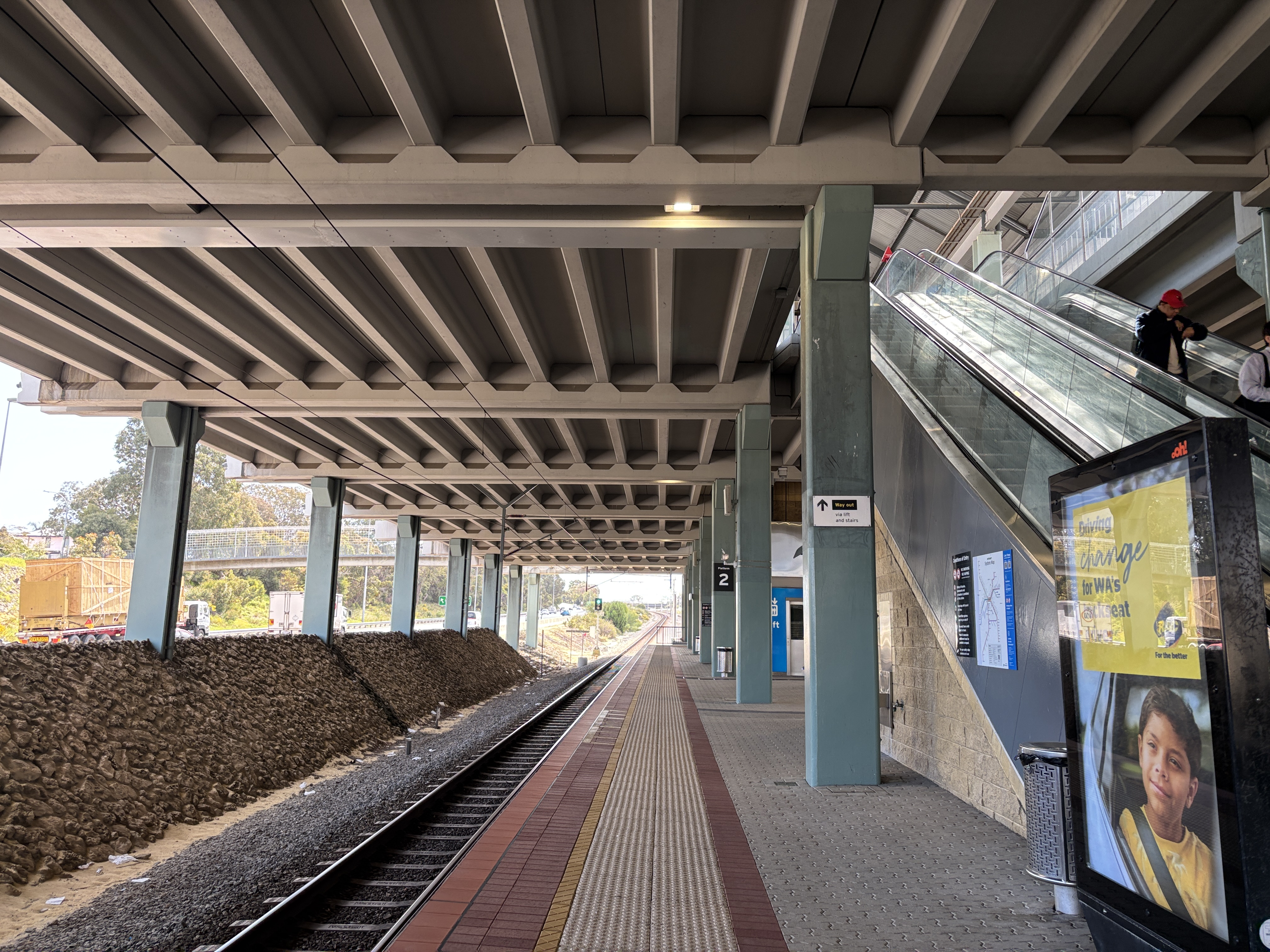
- Northbound view from Platform 2, 2026

General information
- Location: Mitchell Freeway, Warwick; Australia
- Coordinates: 31°50′40″S 115°47′47″E
- Owner: Public Transport Authority
- Operator: Transperth
- Line: Yanchep line
- Distance: 13.0 kilometres (8.1 mi) from Perth
- Platforms: 2 (1 island)
- Tracks: 2
- Bus routes: 19
- Bus stands: 8

Construction
- Structure type: Ground
- Accessible: Yes

Other information
- Station code: JWK; 99831 (platform 1); 99832 (platform 2)
- Fare zone: 2

History
- Opened: 28 February 1993

Passengers
- March 2018: 5,500 per day

Services
| Preceding station | Transperth | Following station |
|---|---|---|
| Stirling towards Elizabeth Quay via Perth Underground | Yanchep line All, K, W | Greenwood towards Whitfords, Clarkson or Yanchep |
Location
- Location of Warwick railway station

Warwick railway station is a railway station on the Transperth network. It is located on the Yanchep line, 13 kilometres (8.1 mi) from Perth Underground station serving the suburb of Warwick.

== History ==
Prior to the commissioning of the site as a railway station, the location was originally a bus interchange known as the Warwick Bus Station. Opened in 1987, it was similar in design and appearance to facilities constructed at Mirrabooka and Rockingham for the same purpose. It provided services connecting the Perth central business district to bus routes servicing the then rapidly expanding northern suburbs. The site also contains a privately operated child care centre which remains in operation as of May 2026.

The original bus station was connected to the adjoining Mitchell Freeway by a two-lane on/off ramp in both the north and south directions, constructed in the middle of the Mitchell Freeway reserve. It was constructed to service freeway express buses from Perth, services which were subsequently phased out with the opening of the railway station. The on/off ramp was connected to the bus station via a bridge spanning the southbound lanes of the Freeway. The bus station was positioned on land north of the connecting bridge between the Freeway East Embankment (controlled by the Main Roads Department), Hawker Avenue, land occupied by the Warwick chapel of the Church of Jesus Christ of Latter-day Saints, and adjoining residential housing.

=== Design and construction ===
At the time of the station's design, it was recognised by The Urban Rail Electrification Committee that the placement of bus services in close proximity or direct connection to rail infrastructure was of significant importance. This was evidenced by the Kelmscott and Armadale stations, and the then recently completed Cannington station.

Under the Northern Suburbs Transit System Project, construction on the station was scheduled to commence on 16 November 1991, with completion expected by the end of December 1992. Whitfords station being of a very similar design was scheduled for construction in synchronisation with Warwick station.

The station was to include a number of facilities, including a bus concourse to connect with feeder bus services, information booths and offices for railway staff, amenities and services, as well as access services for mobility-impaired passengers in line with design requirements of the time. Further to this, pieces of the Passenger Information Network installed at the station included previously unseen electronic displays on the upper bus decks designed to provide drivers with information so they could connect with appointed trains or communicate with bus depot control in the event of delays. Passenger information systems across the network were upgraded as part of the improvements under the New MetroRail Project.

Car parking spaces were also included as part of the construction project, which included a significant number of on-grade parking bays on the eastern side of the station for commuter use.

The design of the station also allowed for the possible extension of the upper bus deck in a southward direction towards Beach Road. This extension would provide for five additional regular bus bays, as well as additional pedestrian access if required.

As part of the construction of the new railway station, the on/off ramps used for buses were demolished, however, the original bridge over the southbound lanes was retained to provide upper-level bus station access. A pedestrian pathway was added to the bridge to enable pedestrian movements from the west side of the station on a new footbridge linking to Methuen Way, Duncraig.

The station consists of an upper bus deck. The deck was constructed of precast concrete that was formed off-site, which was then transported to the site before being placed atop columns constructed as part of the station's foundations. Precast concrete flooring was then put in place and held in specially formed ridges running the length of the beams. This upper deck was the most expensive structural element of the station, and was the cause of significant attention and consideration as part of the design and construction process.

Warwick station was built by Leighton Contractors. Due to construction delays, the station was not complete by the time the Northern Suburbs Railway opened in December 1992. The station was opened on 28 February 1993. The line opened to peak hour service on 21 March 1993, upon which date the bus interchange at Warwick station opened as well.

=== Demolition and associated works ===
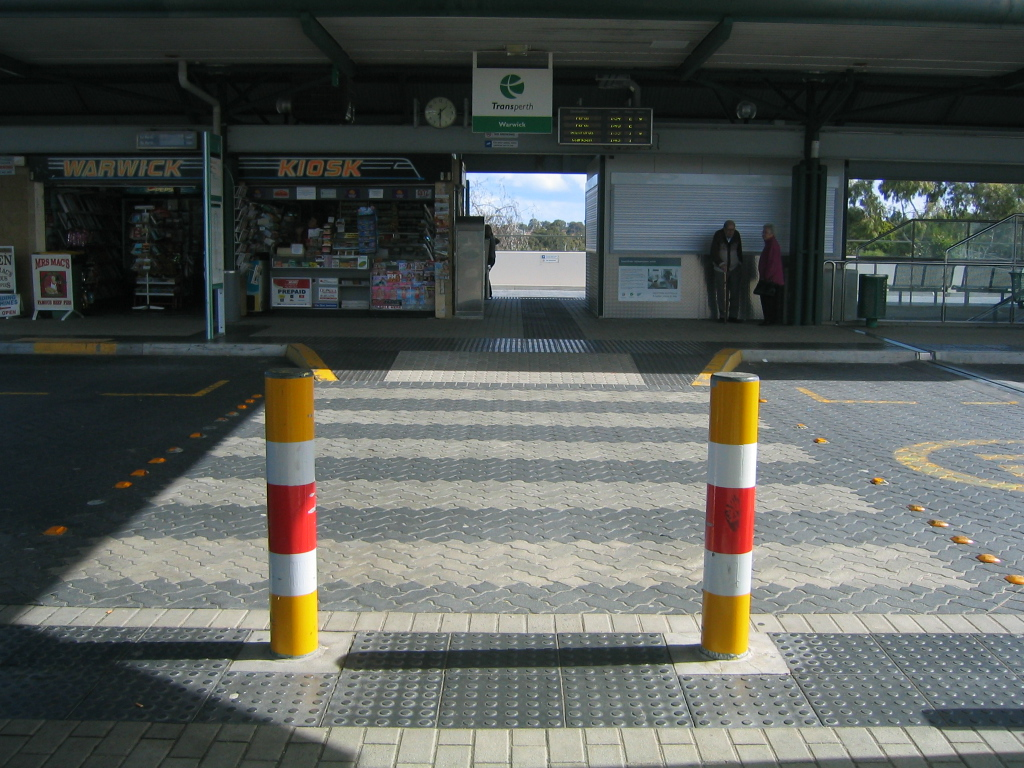
Station Entrance

Once the new railway station including the bus concourse had opened, the old transfer station was demolished. The costs of demolition for the existing station were not included as part of the construction budget for the new railway station. The land resulting from the demolition of the transfer station was then converted into additional commuter car parking space, bringing the available number of bays up to 830.

=== After construction ===
In 2003, the contract for extending the platforms on seven Joondalup line (now Yanchep line) stations, including Warwick station, was awarded to Lakis Constructions. The platforms on these stations had to be extended by 50 metres (160 ft) to accommodate 150-metre (490 ft) long six-car trains, which were planned to enter service. Along with the extensions, the platform edges were upgraded to bring them into line with tactile paving standards. Work on this station began in early 2004, and was complete by July 2004.

== Services ==
Warwick station is served by Transperth Yanchep line services.

In March 2018, Warwick station had approximately 5,500 boardings per weekday, making it the busiest station on the Yanchep line.

== Platforms ==
Warwick platform arrangement
| Stop ID | Platform | Line | Service Pattern | Destination | Via | Notes |
|---|---|---|---|---|---|---|
| 99831 | 1 | Yanchep line | All stations, K, W | Elizabeth Quay | Perth Underground | |
| 99832 | 2 | Yanchep line | All stations | Yanchep | | |
| 99832 | 2 | Yanchep line | K | Clarkson | | |
| 99832 | 2 | Yanchep line | W | Whitfords | | W pattern only during weekday peak times |

== Bus routes ==
| Stop | Route | Destination / description | Notes |
|---|---|---|---|
| Stand 1 | 904 | Rail replacement service to Perth station | |
| Stand 2 | 416 | to Mirrabooka Bus Station via Eglington Crescent, Balcatta Road & Ravenswood Drive | |
| Stand 2 | 975 | to Bayswater Station via Mirrabooka bus station & Galleria bus station | High Frequency |
| Stand 3 | 388 | to Perth Busport via Beach Road & Wanneroo Road | |
| Stand 3 | 427 | to Stirling station via Erindale Road & North Beach Road | |
| Stand 3 | 428 | to Stirling station via Balcatta | |
| Stand 4 | 423 | to Stirling station via Hillarys Boat Harbour & Karrinyup bus station | |
| Stand 4 | 425 | to Stirling station via Carine & Karrinyup bus station | |
| Stand 4 | 441 | to Whitfords station via Seacrest Drive | |
| Stand 4 | 904 | Rail replacement service to Yanchep station | |
| Stand 5 | 442 | to Whitfords station via Waterford Drive | |
| Stand 5 | 443 | to Whitfords station via Giles Avenue | |
| Stand 5 | 444 | to Whitfords station via Gibson Avenue | |
| Stand 6 | 445 | to Whitfords station via Coolibah Drive | |
| Stand 6 | 446 | to Whitfords station via Allenswood Road | |
| Stand 6 | 447 | to Whitfords station via Moolanda Boulevard | |
| Stand 7 | 448 | to Kingsway City Shopping Centre via Blackmore Avenue and Giralt Road | |
| Stand 7 | 449 | to Ballajura Station via Beach Road | |
| Stand 8 | 450 | to Ballajura Station via Kingsway City Shopping Centre, Kingsway, Landsdale, Alexander Drive & Beach Road | |
| Stand 8 | 451 | to Ballajura Station via Alexander Heights & Ballajura | |
