= Whitfords railway station =

Railway station in Perth, Western Australia

Whitfords
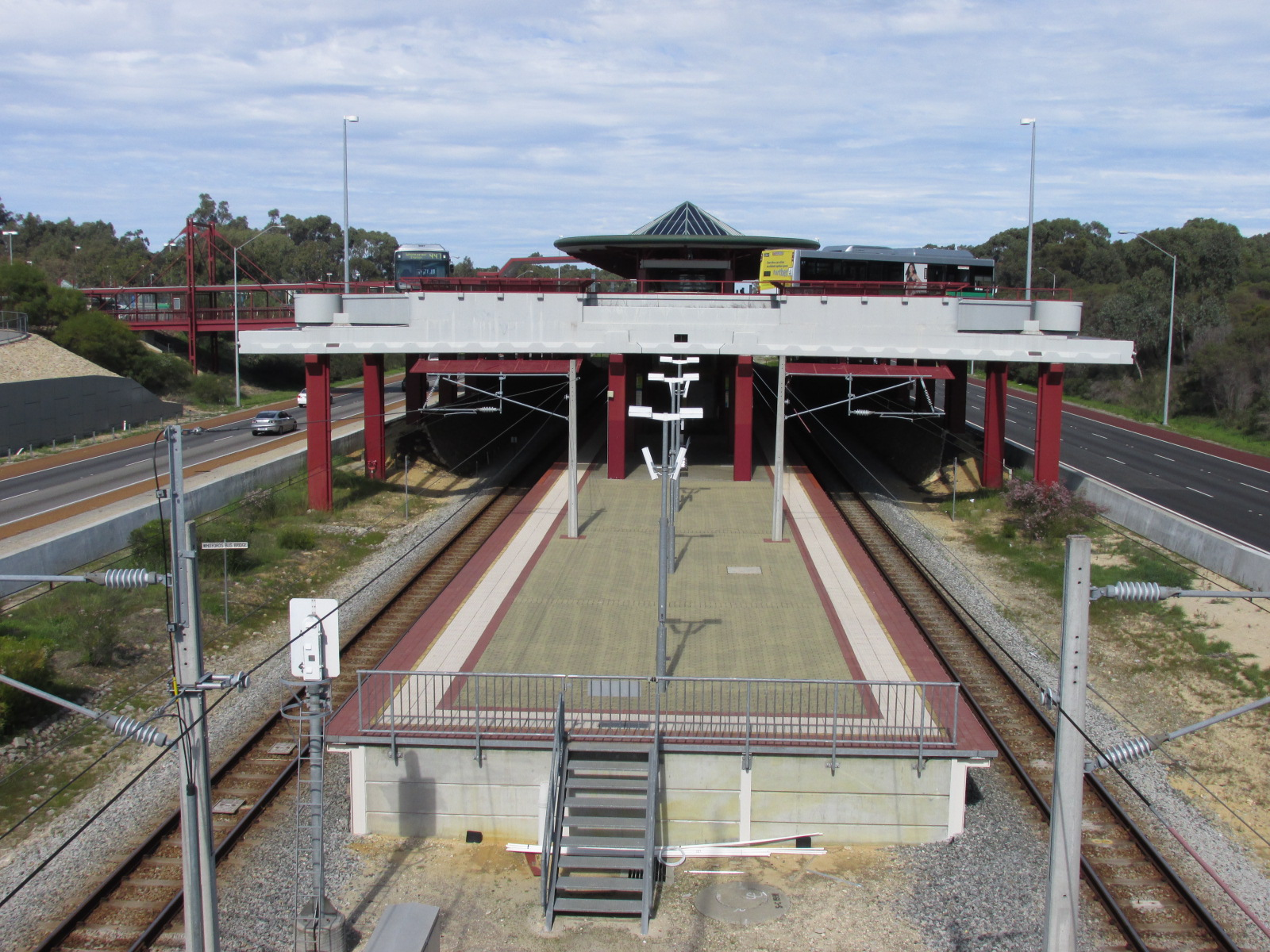
- Southbound view of the station platforms, August 2014

General information
- Location: Mitchell Freeway, Padbury, Western Australia; Australia
- Coordinates: 31°47′58″S 115°46′56″E
- Owner: Public Transport Authority
- Operator: Public Transport Authority
- Line: Yanchep line
- Distance: 19.0 kilometres (11.8 mi) from Perth Underground
- Platforms: 2 platform faces with 1 island platform
- Tracks: 2
- Bus routes: 19
- Bus stands: 8

Construction
- Structure type: Ground
- Parking: 908 bays
- Accessible: Yes

Other information
- Fare zone: 3

History
- Opened: 14 February 1993

Passengers
- March 2018: 4,200 per day

Services
Preceding station	Transperth	Following station
Greenwood towards Elizabeth Quay via Perth Underground	Yanchep line All, K	Edgewater towards Clarkson or Yanchep
Greenwood towards Elizabeth Quay via Perth Underground	Yanchep line W	Terminus
Location
- Location of Whitfords station

Whitfords railway station is a railway station located on the boundary of Padbury and Kingsley, suburbs of Perth, Western Australia. It is on the Yanchep line, which is part of the Transperth commuter rail network. It is located in the median of the Mitchell Freeway, and consists of an elevated bus interchange on top of an island platform at ground level. South of Whitfords, trains run every 5 minutes during peak. North of Whitfords, trains run every 10 minutes during peak. Between peak during the day, trains run every 15 minutes. The journey to Perth Underground railway station is 19.8 kilometres (12.3 mi), and takes 19 minutes.

The station was constructed as part of the Northern Suburbs Transit System project. Construction began in November 1991 and was completed in December 1992. It opened on 28 February 1993, along with most other stations on the Yanchep line (then known as the Joondalup line).

== Description ==
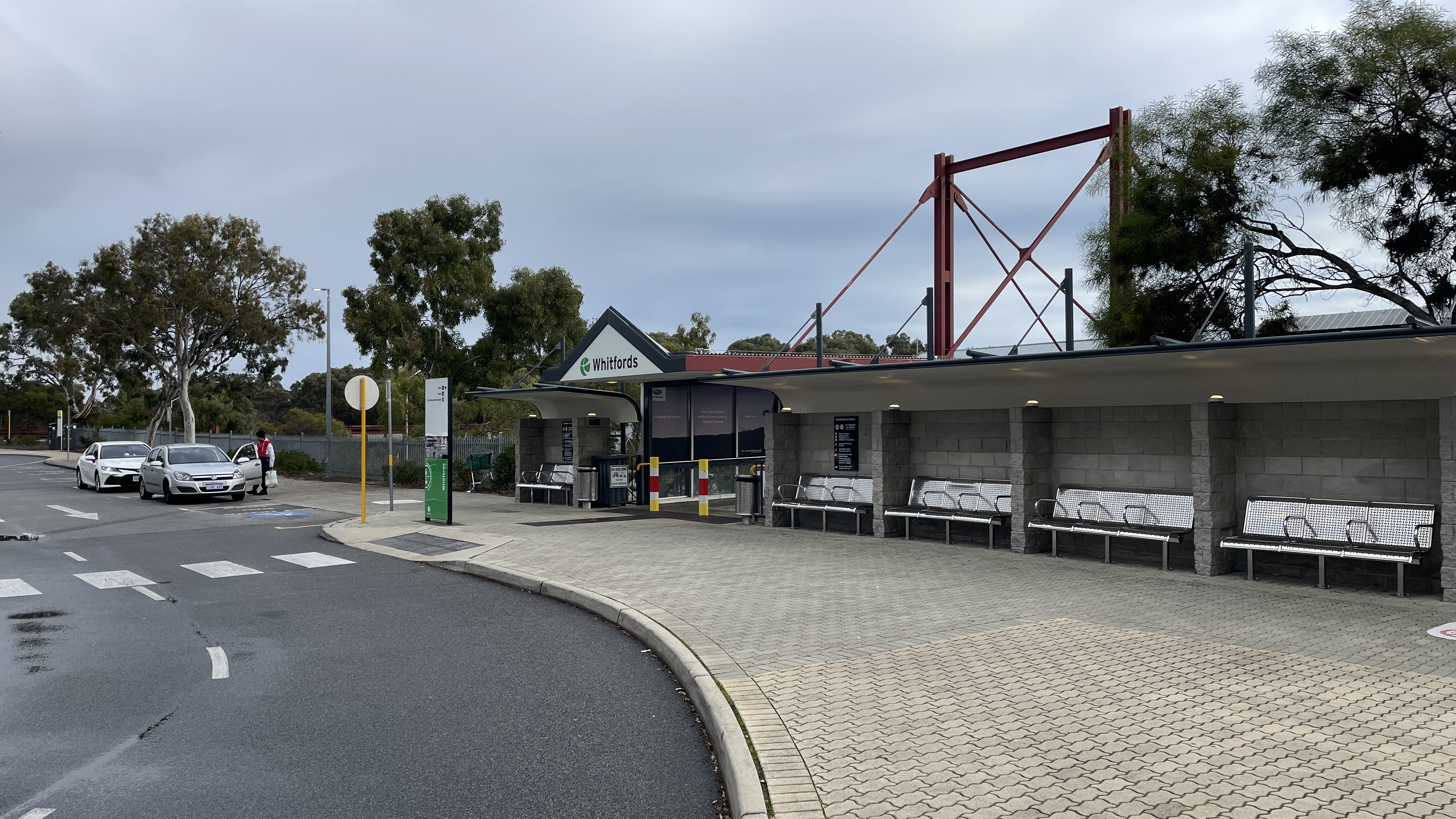
Entrance

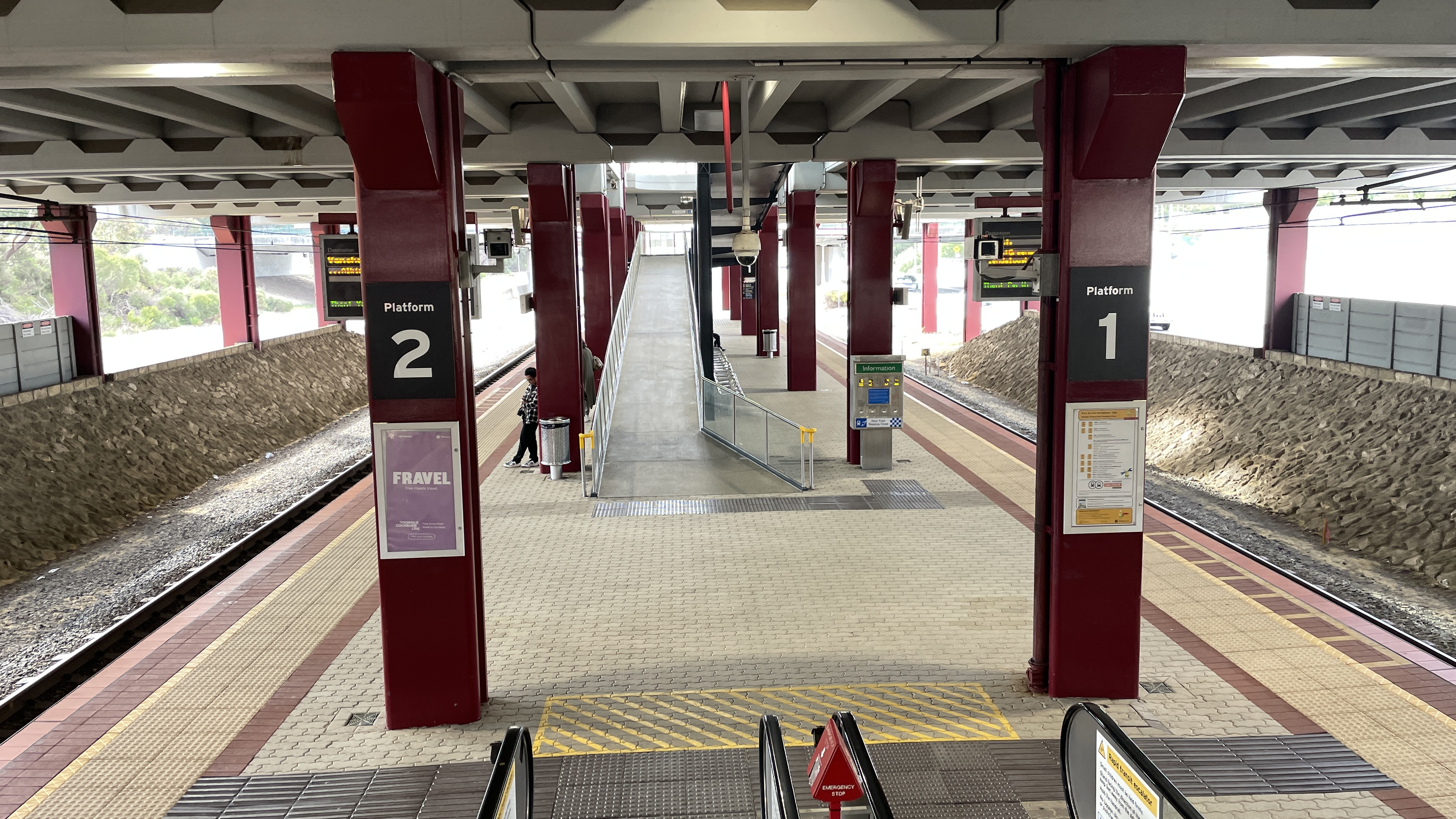
Platforms

Whitfords railway station is on the boundary of Padbury and Kingsley, suburbs of Perth, Western Australia. It is located in the median of the Mitchell Freeway, just south of Whitfords Avenue. The station consists of an elevated bus interchange on top of an island platform at ground level. The bus interchange is a road looping around a central island. The platform is accessed from the bus interchange island via stairs, a set of escalators, a lift, or a ramp. There are toilets and a kiosk on the bus interchange. It is linked to the east over the freeway by a bus bridge and a pedestrian bridge.

Whitfords station is 19.8 kilometres (12.3 mi), or a 19-minute train journey, from Perth Underground railway station, placing the station in fare zone 3. The adjacent stations are Greenwood railway station to the south, and Edgewater railway station to the north. To the north of the station is a 250 metres (820 ft) long turnback siding.

== History ==
=== Design and construction ===
At the time of the station's design, it was recognised by The Urban Rail Electrification Committee that the placement of bus services in close proximity or direct connection to rail infrastructure was of significant importance. This was evidenced by the Kelmscott and Armadale stations, and the then recently completed Cannington station.

Under the Northern Suburbs Transit System Project, construction on the station was scheduled to commence on 16 November 1991, with completion expected by the end of December 1992. Warwick station being of a similar design was scheduled for construction in synchronisation with Whitfords station.

The station was to include a number of facilities, including a bus concourse to connect with feeder bus services, information booths and offices for railway staff, amenities and services, as well as access services for mobility-impaired passengers in line with design requirements of the time. Further to this, pieces of the Passenger Information Network installed at the station included previously unseen electronic displays on the upper bus decks designed to provide drivers with information so they could connect with appointed trains or communicate with bus depot control in the event of delays.

North of the station a headshunt was laid for terminating trains. Even though the siding is in the middle of the Mitchell Freeway with no pedestrian access, Transperth was forced to fence the area in 2006 due to repeated graffiti attacks while trains were briefly in the siding. Car parking spaces were also included as part of the construction project, which included a significant number of on-grade parking bays on the eastern side of the station for commuter use.

The design of the station also allowed for the possible extension of the upper bus deck in a northern direction towards Whitfords Avenue. This extension would provide for five additional regular bus bays, as well as additional pedestrian access if required.

The most interesting part of the station was the upper bus deck. The deck was constructed of precast concrete that was formed off-site, which was then transported to the site before being placed atop columns constructed as part of the station's foundations. The precast concrete flooring was then put in place and held in specially formed ridges running the length of the beams. This upper deck was the most expensive structural element of the station, and was the cause of significant attention and consideration as part of the design and construction process.

Whitfords station was built by Leighton Contractors. Due to construction delays, the station was not complete by the time the Northern Suburbs Railway opened in December 1992. It was opened on 14 February 1993. The line opened to peak hour service on 21 March 1993, upon which date the bus interchange at Whitfords station opened as well.

=== After opening ===
A report done by the Department of Transport in 1999 identified Whitfords station as a station where the existing parking provisions were not sufficient for demand. The report said that the expansion of parking at Whitfords station should be given priority. In 2002, the car park was expanded to the south. The car park was expanded again, in 2009 and 2010, this time north of Whitfords Avenue.

In 2003, the contract for extending the platforms on seven Yanchep line (then Joondalup line) stations, including Whitfords station, was awarded to Lakis Constructions. The platforms on these stations had to be extended by 50 metres (160 ft) to accommodate 150-metre (490 ft) long six-car trains, which were planned to enter service. Along with the extensions, the platform edges were upgraded to bring them into line with tactile paving standards. Work on this station began in early 2004, and was complete by July 2004.

== Services ==
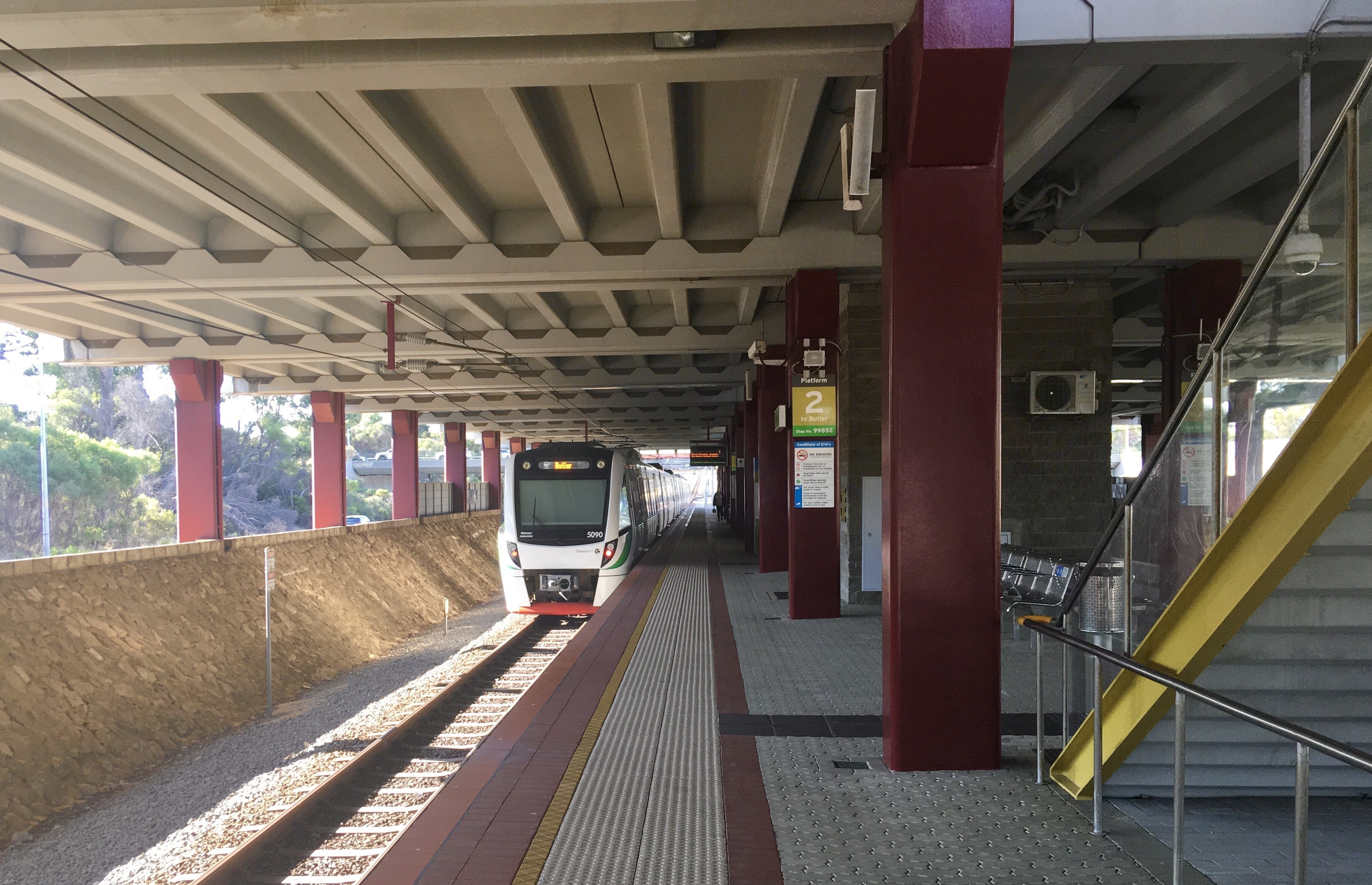
Transperth B-series train departing from Whitfords station

Whitfords is served by the Yanchep line on the Transperth network. This line goes between Yanchep station and Elizabeth Quay station in the Perth central business district. The line continues south from the Perth as a through service to the Mandurah line.

All stops services stop at the station every 10 minutes during peak on weekdays, and every 15 minutes outside peak during the day every day of the year except Christmas Day. At night time, trains are half-hourly or hourly. In addition, during peak, W pattern services run every 10 minutes south of Whitfords, using the turnback siding north of the station to turn around. At the end of peak periods, K pattern services run every 10 minutes from Elizabeth Quay to Clarkson station. The station saw 1,240,654 passengers in the 2013-14 financial year. In March 2018, the station had approximately 4,200 boardings per weekday, making it the fourth busiest station on the Yanchep line.

== Platforms ==
Whitfords platform arrangement
Stop ID	Platform	Line	Service Pattern	Destination	Via	Notes
99851	1	Yanchep line	All stations, K, W	Elizabeth Quay	Perth Underground	W pattern services to Perth begin at Whifords station
99852	2	Yanchep line	All stations	Yanchep		
99852	2	Yanchep line	K	Clarkson		
99852	2	Yanchep line	W	Terminus		

== Bus routes ==
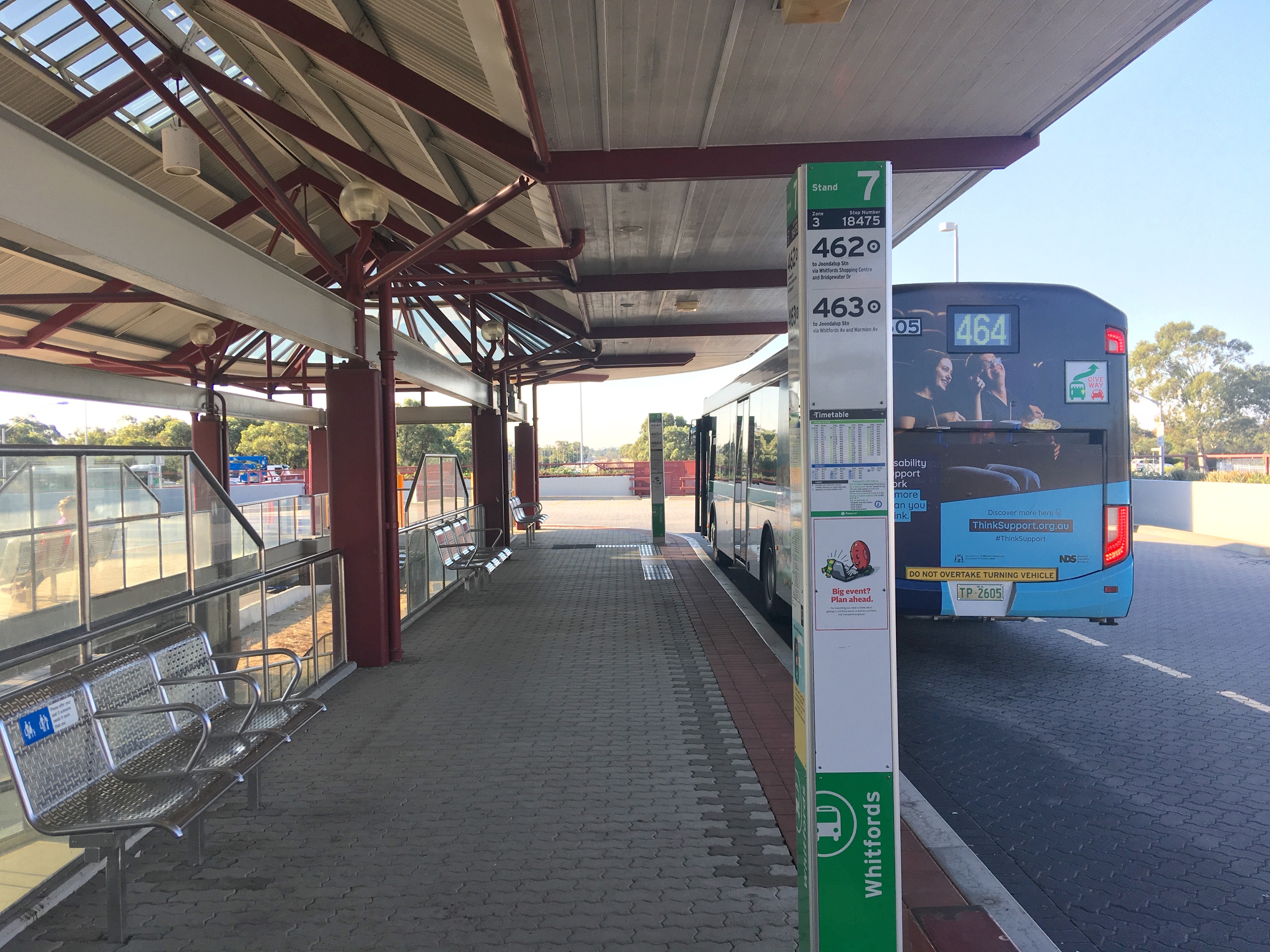
Bus interchange

The bus interchange has eight bus stands with 19 regular bus routes. Buses run to Joondalup railway station, Warwick railway station, Mirrabooka bus station, and Ellenbrook. Train replacement buses operate on route 904.

Stop	Route	Destination / description	Notes
Stand 1	467	to Joondalup station via Pearsall, Hocking & Ashby	
Stand 1	468	to Joondalup station via Wanneroo Road	
Stand 2	374	to Mirrabooka bus station via Madeley & Girrawheen Avenue	
Stand 2	452	to Ballajura Station via Gnangara Road, Landsdale, Alexander Heights & Ballajura	
Stand 2	455	to Ellenbrook Station via Wangara, Gnangara Road & Pinaster Road	
Stand 3	445	to Warwick station via Coolibah Drive	
Stand 3	446	to Warwick station via Allenswood Road	
Stand 3	447	to Warwick station via Moolanda Boulevard	
Stand 3	904	Rail replacement service to Butler station	
Stand 4	443	to Warwick station via Giles Avenue	
Stand 4	444	to Warwick station via Gibson Avenue	
Stand 4	904	Rail replacement service to Perth station	
Stand 5	441	to Warwick station via Seacrest Drive	
Stand 5	442	to Warwick station via Waterford Drive	
Stand 6	460	to Joondalup station via Oceanside Promenade	
Stand 6	461	to Joondalup station via Dampier Avenue	
Stand 7	462	to Joondalup station via Bridgewater Drive	
Stand 7	463	to Joondalup station via Gradient Way	
Stand 8	464	to Joondalup station via Eddystone Avenue	
Stand 8	465	to Joondalup station via Trappers Drive	
Stand 8	466	to Joondalup station via Timberlane Drive	
