= Marshall Road =

Road in Perth, Western Australia

Marshall Road Western Australia
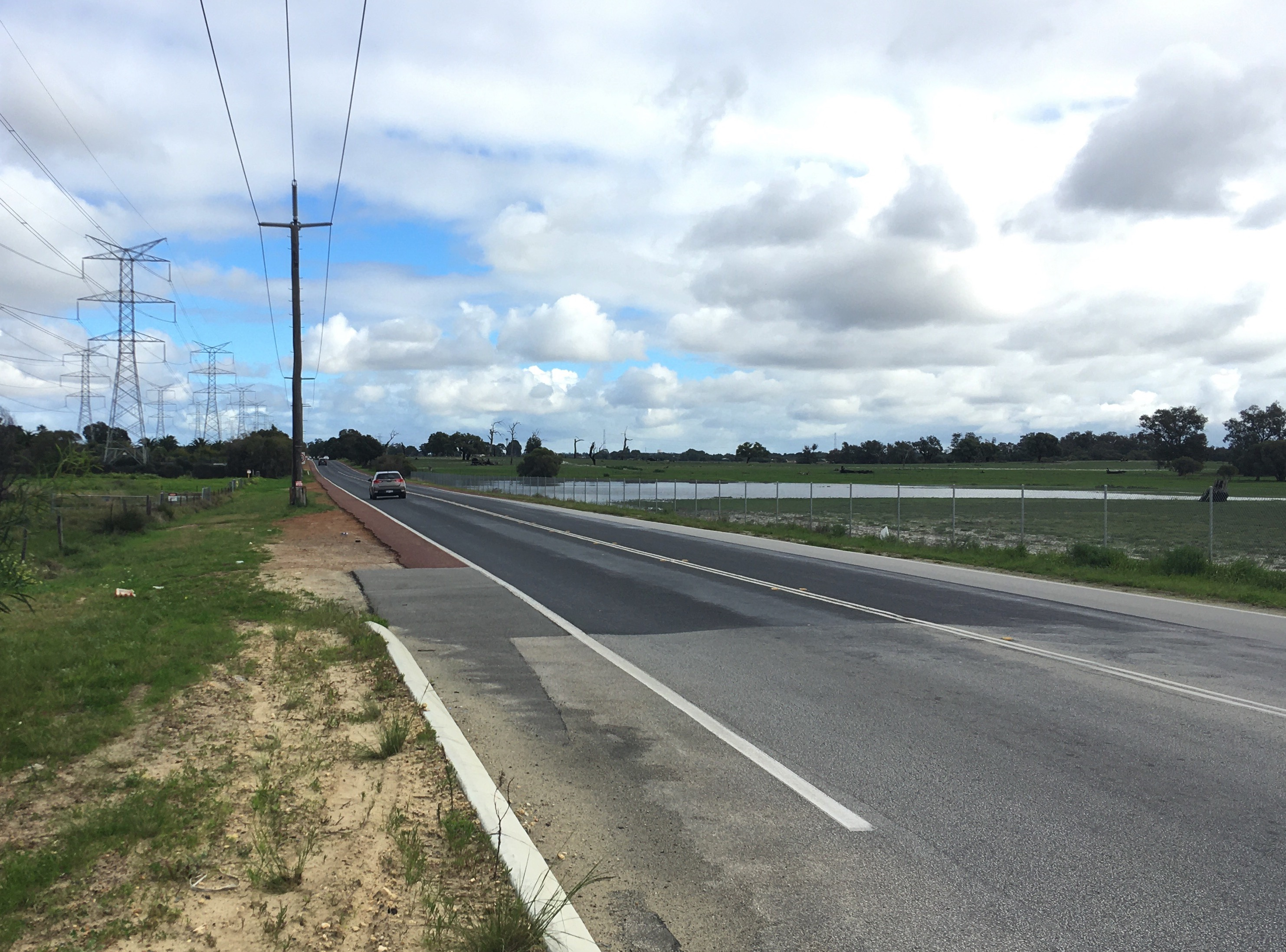
- Marshall Road near Altone Road

General information
- Type: Road
- Length: 7.3 km (4.5 mi)

Major junctions
- East end: Isoodon Street / Dayton Boulevard Dayton
- Altone Road; Beechboro Road North (State Route 53)
- West end: Beach Road / Malaga Drive Malaga

Location(s)
- Major suburbs: Dayton, Bennett Springs, Ballajura, Whiteman

Marshall Road is an east–west road in the northern suburbs of Perth, Western Australia. It is continuous with Beach Road.

== Route description ==
Marshall Road starts off at a roundabout with Isoodon Street and Dayton Boulevard in a suburban development in Dayton. From there, it heads west as a four lane dual carriageway with a speed limit of 60 km/h (37 mph). 220 m (720 ft) later, Marshall Road intersects with Drumpellier Drive. Approximately 200 m (660 ft) after that, Marshall Road turns into a two lane single carriageway with a speed limit of 70 km/h (43 mph). The road becomes somewhat rural in character, as it passes between paddocks in Bennett Springs. The road passes over Bennett Brook before intersecting with Altone Road. On the north side of the road is Whiteman Park, and on the south side of the road is the residential area of Bennett Springs. 2 km (1.2 mi) after that intersection is the intersection with Beechboro Road North. After that intersection, Marshall Road changes back into a four lane dual carriageway.

700 m (2,300 ft) after Beechboro Road North, Marshall Road passes over Tonkin Highway as a flyover. There is a slight kink in the road as the bridge was constructed slightly north of the former alignment of Marshall Road. Just past there, the road bends to the south, and enters the Malaga industrial area. The road then bends to the west before arriving at an roundabout with Guadalupe Drive. Heading north from the roundabout leads to the residential area of Ballajura, and heading south enters the carparks of businesses along Marshall Road. From there, a frontage road runs alongside Marshall Road on both sides, giving access to businesses along the road. Marshall Road continues west, arriving at a traffic light controlled intersection with Bellefin Drive 650 m (2,130 ft) later. Heading north on Bellefin Drive also leads to Ballajura. Marshall Road then bends north and then west, coming to a roundabout with Business Way and Trade Road, two local roads. Marshall Road terminates 160 m (520 ft) after there, at a traffic light controlled intersection with Malaga Drive and Beach Road. Beach Road continues west for another 12.8 km (8.0 mi) through the northern suburbs of Perth.

== History ==
Marshall Road was originally constructed as an unsealed track in the 1950s or 1960s. In the 1970s, it was sealed. However, it was still a minor road on the outskirts of Perth. The area around the road gradually started to be developed in the 1990s, and is continuing to this day.

In the late 1990s, Lord Street was extended south of Marshall Road. This involved a small realignment of Marshall Road. Marshall Road was also realigned approximately 200 m (660 ft) south in Malaga during the late 1990s, including a partial upgrade to dual carriageway between Beach Road and Bellefin Drive. In 2002, Altone Road was connected to Marshall Road. Between 2006 and 2008, Marshall Road was duplicated between Bellefin Drive and Beechboro Road North. Between 2008 and 2010, the eastern terminus of Marshall Road was converted into a roundabout, as a result of the area getting busier due to suburban development.

In August 2010, construction started on extending Hepburn Avenue south from its previous terminus to Marshall Road. It was planned to be finished in April 2011, but it was delayed. Eventually, it opened in June 2012. In February 2018, the intersection of Marshall Road and Hepburn Avenue was permanently closed to make way for the extension of Tonkin Highway as part of the NorthLink WA project. As part of that project, a bridge was constructed to carry Marshall Road over Tonkin Highway. The bridge was built just north of the existing Marshall Road alignment, so that the road could remain open during construction. The bridge opened in November 2018 as a two lane single carriageway, and as a four lane dual carriageway in April 2019.

In 2018 and 2019, as part of the New Lord Street project, a small portion of Marshall Road was rebuilt on a new alignment as a four lane dual carriageway, and a new intersection was built with New Lord Street, later called Drumpellier Drive. Various closures of this part of Marshall Road occurred during this time.

== Junction list ==
| LGA | Location | km | mi | Destinations | Notes |
|---|---|---|---|---|---|
| Swan | Dayton | 0.0 | 0.0 | Isoodon Street north and south / Dayton Boulevard east – Dayton, West Swan | Marshall Road terminus; Roundabout |
| Swan | Bennett Springs | 0.2 | 0.12 | Drumpellier Drive – Caversham, Ellenbrook | Traffic light controlled intersection |
| Swan | Bennett Springs | 1.2 | 0.75 | Dulwich Street – Whiteman | Roundabout |
| Swan | Bennett Springs–Whiteman border | 2.3 | 1.4 | Altone Road – Bennett Springs, Beechboro, Kiara, Lockridge | |
| Swan | Bennett Springs–Whiteman border | 4.2 | 2.6 | Beechboro Road North – Beechboro, Morley | Traffic light controlled intersection |
| Swan | Bennett Springs–Whiteman–Ballajura–Malaga quadripoint | 4.9 | 3.0 | Hepburn Avenue | Formerly traffic light controlled intersection; currently replaced by Tonkin Highway flyover |
| Swan | Malaga | 5.8 | 3.6 | Guadalupe Drive – Ballajura | Roundabout |
| Swan | Malaga | 6.5 | 4.0 | Bellefin Drive – Ballajura | Traffic light controlled intersection |
| Swan | Malaga | 7.1 | 4.4 | Business Way north / Trade Road south – Malaga, Ballajura | Roundabout |
| Swan | Malaga | 7.3 | 4.5 | Beach Road west / Malaga Drive south – Noranda, Mirrabooka, Warwick, Duncraig | Marshall Road terminus; road continues west as Beach Road; Traffic light controlled intersection |
Closed/former

== See also ==
- List of major roads in Perth, Western Australia
