= Gnangara Road =

Road in Perth, Western Australia

Coordinates: 31°47′44″S 115°56′06″E

Gnangara Road Western Australia
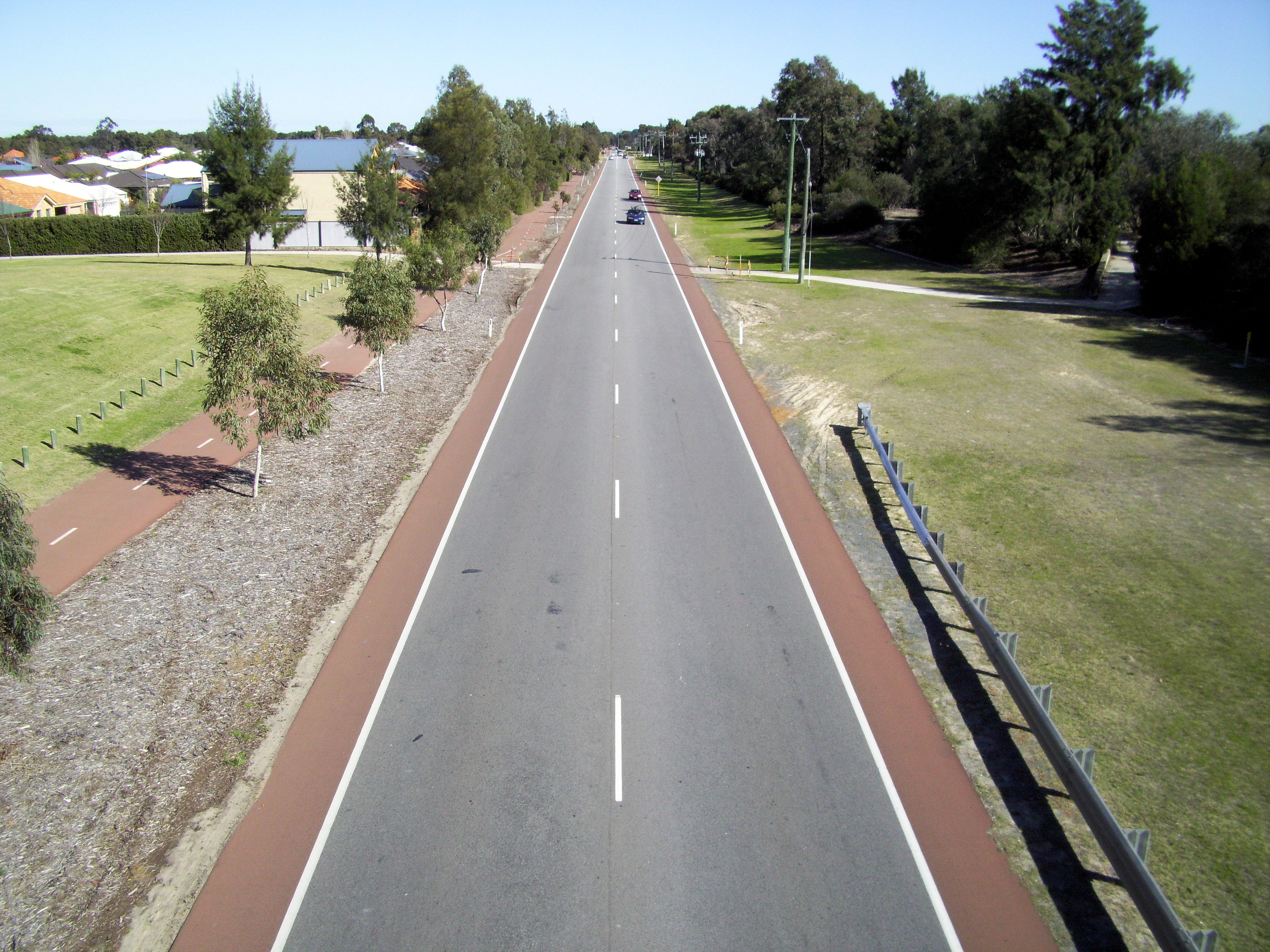
- Looking west, from Ellenbrook

General information
- Type: Road
- Length: 17.7 km (11 mi)
- Route number(s): State Route 83 (Wanneroo Road to Ocean Reef Road); State Route 84 (Ocean Reef Road to West Swan Road)

Major junctions
- West end: Wanneroo Road (State Route 60 / State Route 83), Madeley
- Mirrabooka Avenue; Ocean Reef Road (State Route 84); Alexander Drive (State Route 56); Tonkin Highway (State Route 4); Drumpellier Drive
- East end: West Swan Road (State Route 52), Henley Brook

Location(s)
- Major suburbs: Wangara, Landsdale, Gnangara, Cullacabardee, Lexia, Whiteman, Ellenbrook, Aveley

Gnangara Road is an arterial east–west road in Perth, Western Australia. It is located within the northern suburbs of Perth, from Madeley in the west, to Henley Brook in the east. Gnangara Road provides a connection between Great Northern Highway (via West Swan Road) and Wanneroo Road. The construction of the Ocean Reef Road extension in 2011 altered the road network in the Landsdale area in Landsdale. The plans show Gnangara Road as discontinuous between Mirrabooka Avenue and Alexander Drive, with the Mirrabooka Avenue and Ocean Reef Road extensions linking the two sections. Following construction, those linking road sections were named as Gnangara Road, allowing the road to remain continuous.

== Route description ==
View eastbound from Hartman Drive

From its western terminus at Wanneroo Road, Gnangara Road travels along the southern boundary of the Wangara industrial area. It continues east to reach Mirrabooka Avenue after 3.7 km (2.3 mi), where it then travels northwards for 350 m (1,150 ft) to Ocean Reef Road, before turning right to continue east for 1.5 km (0.9 mi) to Alexander Drive, and then after another 5 km (3.1 mi) it encounters Tonkin Highway at a parclo interchange. The road travels past Whiteman Park's northern edge, and the southern edge of Ellenbrook. It finally terminates, after 17.7-kilometre-long (11.0 mi) journey, in Henley Brook at West Swan Road, which connects northwards to Great Northern Highway, and southwards to Reid Highway.

== History ==
Traffic lights were installed in 2007 at the then-recently duplicated Alexander Drive intersection.

In 2011, as part of the Ocean Reef Road extension, the section between Mirrabooka Avenue/Sydney Road/Ocean Reef Road intersection and West Swan Road had the State Route 83 allocation replaced by State Route 84. The road is discontinuous at Wangara, where motorists will have to travel northwards along Mirrabooka Avenue to turn right at the nearby intersection to continue on Gnangara Road.

Gnangara Road was upgraded to a four lane dual carriage way between Drumpellier Drive and Pinaster Parade, near Ellenbrook. The works began in May 2012, and included traffic lights at the intersection of Gnangara Road and Drumpellier Drive, drainage, and kerbing. The upgrade works were completed on schedule, in December 2012, at a cost of more the $3.3 million.

Also in 2012 a single lane roundabout was constructed at Gnangara Road's eastern terminus with West Swan Road and Henry Street. Construction works began after the relocation of water and electrical services, and took 12 to 15 months.

The state government committed $6.6 million to construct a second carriageway between Beechboro Road North and Drumpellier Drive, and an additional $14 million to complete the remaining 7.9 kilometres (4.9 mi) up to Alexander Drive which took place between 2013 and 2015. The works involved installing traffic lights at the intersection with Beechboro Road North, which was the site of 131 accidents during the five-year period to 2010, and rated fifth in the RAC's 2012 list of Western Australia's worst intersections. In 2019, the intersection was subsequently removed as part of the NorthLink WA project due both to the new parclo interchange with Tonkin Highway opening just to the east along with the carriageway itself crossing the path of Beechboro Road North (that road was made a cul-de-sac at its northern end accessible from near Hepburn Avenue).

== Future Works ==
Gnangara Road in the City of Swan is planned to ultimately be upgraded to a six lane dual carriageway road between Alexander Drive and Tonkin Highway, and a four lane dual carriage road between Tonkin Highway and Pinaster Parade.

The City of Swan also has plans for a shared pedestrian–cyclist path (Principal Shared Path) alongside Gnangara Road from Pinaster Parade to Tonkin Highway. The estimated cost is $2.96 million.

== Major intersections ==
All intersections listed below are roundabout-controlled unless otherwise indicated.

LGA	Location	km	mi	Destinations	Notes
Joondalup–Wanneroo boundary	Kingsley–Madeley boundary	0	0.0	Wanneroo Road (State Route 60 / State Route 83 north) – Lancelin, Wanneroo, Padbury, Perth	Traffic light controlled t-junction
Wanneroo	Wangara–Madeley–Landsdale tripoint	1.6	0.99	Hartman Drive – Pearsall, Darch	
Wanneroo	Wangara–Landsdale boundary	2.8	1.7	Prestige Parade north / Attwell Street south	
Wanneroo	Wangara–Landsdale boundary	3.8	2.4	Mirrabooka Avenue south – Alexander Heights, Marangaroo, Mirrabooka	Eastbound traffic turns north, southbound traffic turns west
Wanneroo	Wangara–Gnangara–Landsdale tripoint	4.1	2.5	Ocean Reef Road (State Route 84) west / Sydney Road north – Ocean Reef, Joondalup, Jandabup	Traffic light controlled intersection. Eastbound traffic turns east, westbound traffic turns south. State Route 83 eastern terminus
Wanneroo–Swan boundary	Gnangara–Cullacabardee–Landsdale tripoint	5.7	3.5	Alexander Drive (State Route 56) – Ballajura, Dianella, Perth	Traffic light controlled intersection
Swan	Lexia–Cullacabardee boundary	9.9	6.2	Beechboro Road North (State Route 53)	Removed in 2019 as part of NorthLink WA, replaced with Tonkin Highway interchange
Swan	Lexia–Whiteman-Cullacabardee tripoint	10.5– 11.1	6.5– 6.9	Tonkin Highway (State Route 4) – Geraldton, Meekatharra, Ellenbrook, Morley	Six-ramp parclo interchange favouring Tonkin Highway. Tonkin north to Gnangara east and Tonkin south to Gnangara west ramps looped.
Swan	Lexia–Ellenbrook–Henley Brook–Whiteman quadripoint	13.5	8.4	Drumpellier Drive – Ellenbrook, Brabham, Dayton, Caversham	Traffic light controlled intersection. Access to future Whiteman Park railway station
Swan	Ellenbrook–Henley Brook boundary	14.0	8.7	Starflower Road south / Pinaster Parade north – Ellenbrook, Brabham	
Swan	Aveley–Ellenbrook–Henley Brook tripoint	15.6	9.7	Henley Brook Avenue	
Swan	Aveley–Henley Brook boundary	16.4	10.2	Egerton Drive	
Swan	Belhus–Henley Brook boundary	17.7	11.0	West Swan Road (State Route 52, Tourist Drive 203) – Upper Swan, West Swan, Guildford	Eastern terminus. Continues as Henry Street east. Access to the Swan Valley wine region
1.000 mi = 1.609 km; 1.000 km = 0.621 mi: Closed/former; Route transition; Unopened
