= Beechboro Road =

Road in Perth, Western Australia

Beechboro Road: Beechboro Road North; Beechboro Road South; Western Australia
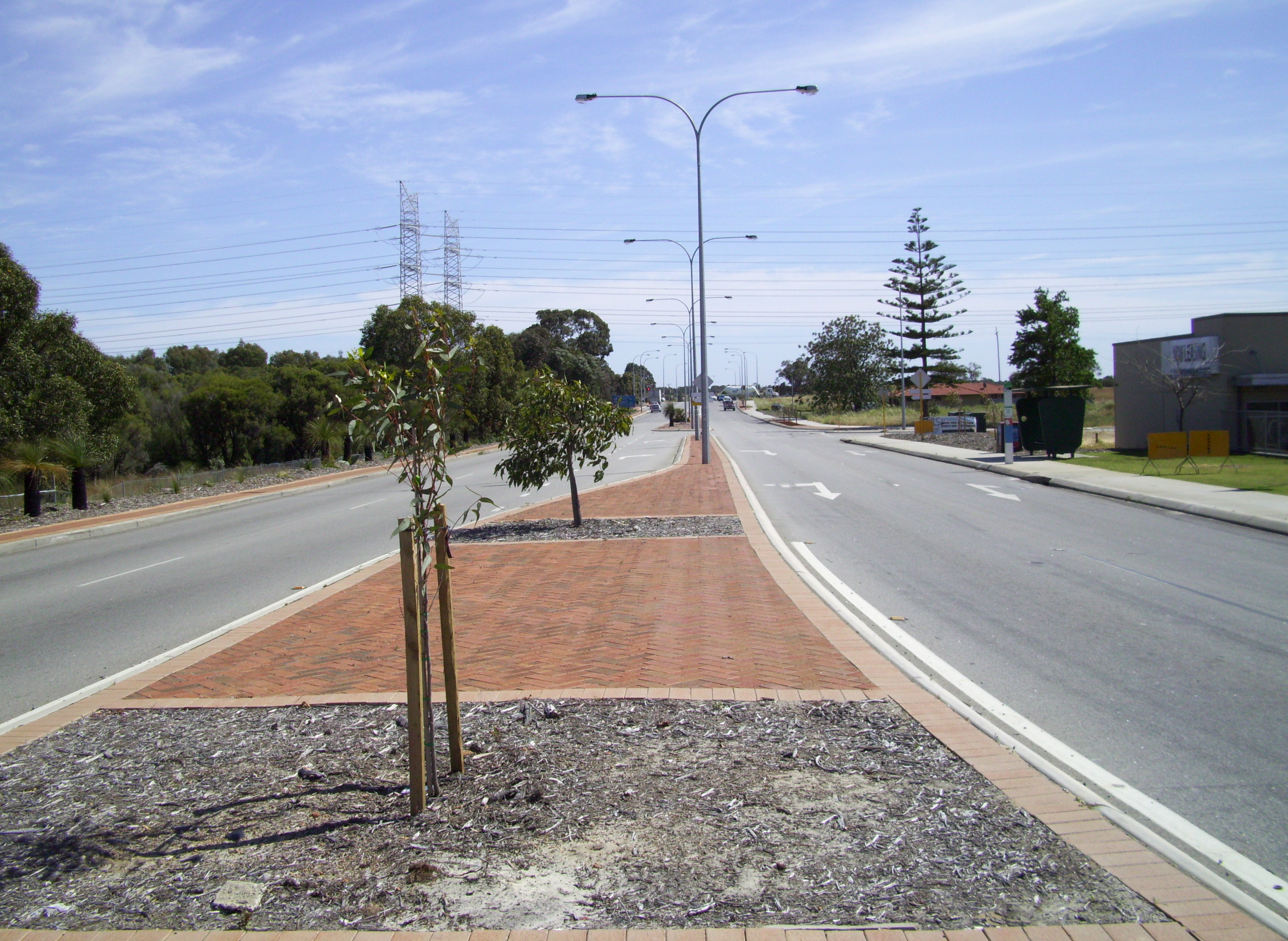
- Looking north, in Bennett Springs

General information
- Type: Road
- Length: 11.8 km (7.3 mi)
- Route number(s): State Route 53 (Tonkin Highway to Walter Road East)

Major junctions
Beechboro Road North
- North end: Tonkin Highway interchange with Hepburn Avenue Ballajura
- Marshall Road; Benara Road; Morley Drive East (State Route 76)
- South end: Cul-de-sac north of Tonkin Highway, Embleton
Beechboro Road South
- North end: Cul-de-sac south of Tonkin Highway, Embleton
- Embelton Avenue; Collier Road
- South end: Whatley Crescent, Bayswater

Location(s)
- Major suburbs: Morley, Beechboro, Cullacabardee

Beechboro Road is a north–south arterial road located in the northeastern suburbs of Perth, Western Australia, connecting Morley and Bayswater with areas further north. Until the construction of the nearby section of Tonkin Highway between 1984 and 1992, and later, during the NorthLink WA road project between 2016 and 2019, Beechboro Road was one of northeastern Perth's most important routes. The road is discontinuous at Tonkin Highway, with the section from Tonkin Highway to Walter Road officially known as Beechboro Road North, and the section running through Bayswater as Beechboro Road South.

Beechboro Road North is allocated State Route 53 for almost its entire length. Prior to 2019, this allocation extended northwards to Gnangara Road, but had since been truncated at Tonkin Highway and Hepburn Avenue due to the NorthLink WA road project.

== Route description ==
=== Beechboro Road South ===
Beechboro Road South runs entirely through Bayswater and is 2.6 kilometres (1.6 mi) long. The road is mostly a two-lane single carriageway and runs through residential and some industrial areas upon reaching its northern end.

Beechboro Road South commences as a continuation of Whatley Crescent at a traffic light controlled T-junction with Rose Avenue in the Bayswater town centre. The road initially runs through residential areas but transitions to industrial areas after 1 kilometre (0.62 mi). Another 800 metres (2,600 ft) takes the road to a traffic light controlled intersection with Collier Road. The road turns right after 100 metres (330 ft), while the main traffic flow continues northwards as Embleton Avenue, and terminates in a cul-de-sac north of Tonkin Highway 700 metres (2,300 ft) north-eastwards.

=== Beechboro Road North ===
Beechboro Road North is 9.2 kilometres (5.7 mi) long and is part of State Route 53. The road is mostly two lanes in each direction which alternates between single and dual carriageway, with one lane south of Walter Road East.

Beechboro Road North commences at a cul-de-sac north of Tonkin Highway in Embleton. 350 metres (1,150 ft) later, the road encounters a traffic light intersection with Broun Avenue to the west and Walter Road East to the east, gaining the State Route 53 north of that intersection. Now within the suburb of Morley and a four-lane single carriageway, the road intersects at traffic lights with Morley Drive East 650 metres (2,130 ft) later, and then, now a dual carriageway, another 1.5 kilometres (0.93 mi) later takes the road to Benara Road, also at traffic lights. The road travels through the suburb of Beechboro for another 1.5 kilometres (0.93 mi) before reaching Reid Highway, which Beechboro Road passes over, with the two roads having had formerly intersected with each other at traffic lights before 2018. Following this flyover the suburb is now within the residential suburb of Bennett Springs, encountering a roundabout with Orchid Avenue and Bridgeman Drive and a T-junction with Bennett Springs Drive, all within 750 metres (2,460 ft) before intersecting with Marshall Road at traffic lights.

Following this intersection Beechboro Road North is within the suburb of Whiteman for about 1.8 kilometres (1.1 mi), during which it forms part of the western border of Whiteman Park. After 0.3 kilometres (0.19 mi) beyond Marshall Road the road encounters a roundabout providing access to Ballajura railway station and then crosses over the upcoming Ellenbrook railway line (as part of the Metronet project) 0.4 kilometres (0.25 mi) further. After crossing the line the road then intersects with Whiteman Drive (an entrance to Whiteman Park) and Hennessey Road (the former section of Beechboro Road North between Hepburn Avenue and Gnangara Road). Beechboro Road North ends at a roundabout interchange with Tonkin Highway, continuing westwards as Hepburn Avenue.

== History ==
The road was first commissioned during the 1970s as a road that tracked the then-new northeastern suburbs of Perth, running all the way to Gnangara Road.

Upon the completion of the nearby section of Tonkin Highway from Railway Parade to Morley Drive in 1984, Beechboro Road was split into two parts, becoming discontinuous on both sides of the highway. In 1992, the intersection with Reid Highway opened when it was extended eastwards from Tonkin Highway. The location of this intersection required impact analysis and environmental review.

In 2010, a new extension of Hepburn Avenue to Beechboro Road North opened nearby, resulting in the latter being realigned with Beechboro Road traffic coming from the south continuing as Pass Way that would terminate at Hepburn Avenue. To continue onto Beechboro Road North, traffic had to turn right at the roundabout. This alignment was later removed in 2018 as part of nearby works for the NorthLink WA project.

Beechboro Road North was heavily affected during the NorthLink WA road project during 2018 and 2019. The intersection with Reid Highway was converted to a flyover due to its close proximity to the combination interchange between Reid and Tonkin Highways. The road was also realigned to connect with Hepburn Avenue at a roundabout interchange with Tonkin Highway, which shortened its original length by nearly 7 km, and the road was duplicated in the vicinity of the interchange. The section from Hepburn Avenue to Gnangara Road was also affected due to Tonkin Highway crossing its path and passing just south of its original northern terminus with Gnangara Road, with said section becoming a cul-de-sac at its northern end, and renamed Hennessey Road.

The southern terminus of Beechboro Road South was later realigned during the rebuild of Bayswater railway station in 2023. Prior to the rebuild Beechboro Road South commenced as a continuation of Railway Parade 200 m east of a traffic light controlled T-junction with Coode Street in the Bayswater town centre. Since the rebuild of Bayswater as an elevated train station Beechboro Road South now connects directly under the line to Whatley Crescent.

=== Hennessey Road ===
Hennessey Road is the current name of the original section of Beechboro Road North between Hepburn Avenue and Gnangara Road. This section of the route provided a link to Gnangara Road and Ellenbrook from Marshall Road when it was still part of Beechboro Road North, as well as provide access to the Cullacabardee community and Whiteman Park hobby clubs, which it still does today. As a result of the NorthLink WA works, the road was permanently closed north of Jules Steiner Memorial Drive (the entrance road to the shooting complex) in January 2019, and reduced to a local access road. The road is accessible from a left-in/left-out intersection at Beechboro Road North.

== Major intersections ==
=== Beechboro Road North ===
Intersections along the northern section are controlled by traffic lights unless otherwise indicated.

| LGA | Location | km | mi | Destinations | Notes |
|---|---|---|---|---|---|
| Swan | Lexia–Cullacabardee bonudary | | | Gnangara Road (State Route 84) | Previous northern terminus. Removed in 2019 as part of NorthLink WA, replaced with Tonkin Highway interchange |
| Swan | Ballajura–Cullacabardee–Whiteman tripoint | 0.0 | 0.0 | Tonkin Highway (State Route 4) – Muchea, Ellenbrook, Morley, Perth Airport | Current northern terminus for both Beechboro Road North and State Route 53 at a roundabout interchange favouring Tonkin Highway. Continues as Hepburn Avenue (State Route 82) northwest-bound |
| Swan | Whiteman | 0.3 | 0.19 | Hennessey Road | LILO intersection, connects to the previous alignment of Beechboro Road north. |
| Swan | Whiteman | 1.6 | 0.99 | Ballajura railway station access road | Roundabout |
| Swan | Bennett Springs–Whiteman border | 1.9 | 1.2 | Marshall Road – Warwick, Malaga, Dayton | |
| Swan | Bennett Springs | 2.3 | 1.4 | Orchid Avenue westbound / Bridgeman Drive eastbound | Roundabout |
| Swan | Bennett Springs–Beechboro border | 2.7 | 1.7 | Reid Highway (State Route 3) | Replaced with a flyover since 2019 as part of the NorthLink WA project. Previously a traffic light controlled instruction |
| Bayswater | Morley | 4.1 | 2.5 | Benara Road – Noranda, Lockridge, Caversham | |
| Bayswater | Morley | 5.7 | 3.5 | Morley Drive East (State Route 76) – Trigg, Dianella, Eden Hill | |
| Bayswater | Morley–Bayswater–Embleton tripoint | 6.3 | 3.9 | Broun Avenue westbound (State Route 53) / Walter Road East eastbound – Perth, Inglewood, Bassendean | State Route 53 southern concurrency terminus. Traffic connecting to/from Beechboro Road South must turn and follow Broun then Embleton Avenues. |
| Bayswater | Embleton–Bayswater boundary | 6.7 | 4.2 | Cul-de-sac | Southern terminus of Beechboro Road North just prior to Tonkin Highway |
Closed/former; Concurrency terminus; Incomplete access; Route transition; Note: Intersections with minor local roads are not shown

=== Beechboro Road South ===
This section lies entirely within the City of Bayswater.

| Location | km | mi | Destinations | Notes |
|---|---|---|---|---|
| Embleton–Bayswater boundary | 0 | 0.0 | Cul-de-sac | Northern terminus of Beechboro Road South just prior to Tonkin Highway |
| Embleton–Bayswater boundary | 0.6 | 0.37 | Embleton Avenue – Morley | Unsignalised T-intersection. Traffic continuing on Beechboro Road South must turn here. Traffic connecting to/from Beechboro Road North must continue straight via Embleton then Broun Avenues. |
| Embleton–Bayswater boundary | 0.8 | 0.50 | Collier Road – Morley, Bassendean | Signalised intersection. Connection to Tonkin Highway |
| Bayswater | 2.4 | 1.5 | Railway Parade – Ashfield, Bassendean | Unsignalised T-intersection. Access to Ashfield railway station |
| Bayswater | 2.5 | 1.6 | Rose Avenue north / Railway Parade west | Southern terminus at signalised T-intersection, continues as Whatley Crescent to Maylands. No right turn possible from Rose Avenue/Railway Parade. Access to Bayswater railway station |
Incomplete access; Note: Intersections with minor local roads are not shown
