= Beechboro, Western Australia =

Beechboro
- Suburb
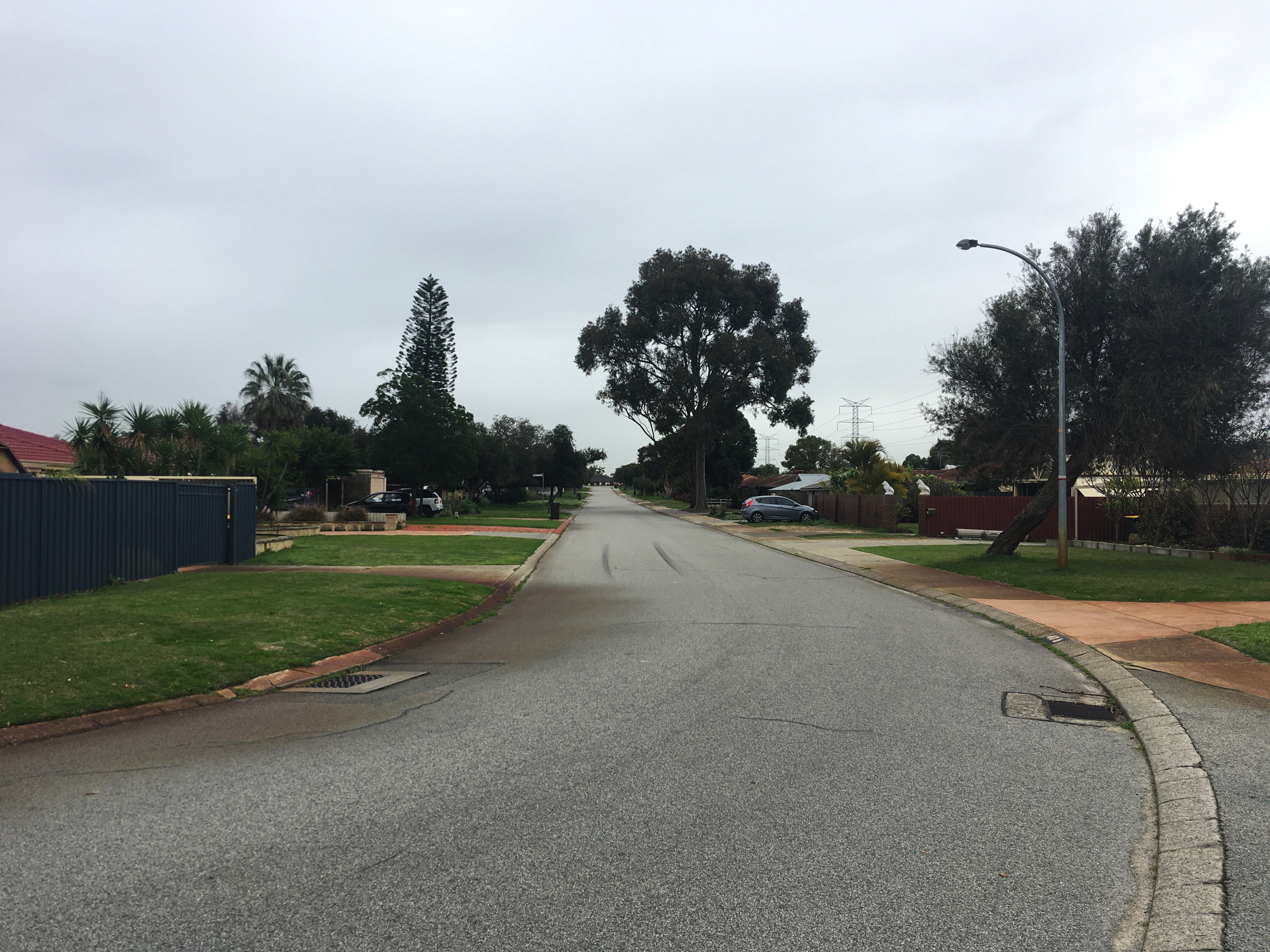
- Pilkington Circus in August 2021
- Interactive map of Beechboro
- Coordinates: 31.862°S 115.939°E
- Country: Australia
- State: Western Australia
- City: Perth
- LGA: City of Swan

Government
  - State electorates: Bassendean; Midland; Morley
  - Federal division: Hasluck

Area
  - Total: 4.7 km^{2} (1.8 sq mi)

Population
  - Total: 9,112 (SAL 2021)
- Postcode: 6063
Suburbs around Beechboro
Malaga	Bennett Springs	West Swan
Noranda	Beechboro	Caversham
Morley	Kiara	Lockridge

Beechboro is a suburb of Perth, Western Australia, located within the City of Swan.

== History ==
The name Beechboro reflects the history of the first European owner of land in the area. In 1892, Henry Brockman subdivided land in the area. The Brockman Family were well established landowners in the Swan River Colony and had considerable estates in England. Beechboro Park (Kent, England) was the name of one of these estates and he named his new subdivisions after it.

The area initially was a small agricultural hub, but is mostly an area for suburban living in the modern day.

== Subdivisions – development and features ==
Beechboro has developed in a number of stages:

- East Beechboro – the trapezoidal area east of Altone Road through to Lord Street, bounded by Reid Highway to the north and Benara Road to the south. Housing dates from 1979 through to the late 1980s. Block sizes are typically 600-800m2. Construction is usually brick and tile three bedroom one bathroom detached homes; with a few duplexes.
- West Beechboro – the square-shaped area west of Altone Road through to Beechboro Road North, again bounded by Reid Highway to the north and Benara Road to the south. Housing in West Beechboro dates from mid to late 1980s. Block sizes are typically 600-800m2. Construction is predominantly brick and tile; and the houses while still a majority of 3x1's, have increased in size and include a small number of 4x1's and some 4x2's.
- Timberlane Estate – a chunk of houses to the western extreme of Beechboro, defined by the boundaries of Reid Highway, Beechboro Road North and a dotted line on the southern edge running along the backyards of Blackboy Way.
- Bennett Springs and Orchid Park were neighbourhoods of Beechboro until they became part of a new suburb of Bennett Springs in April 2011.

== Transport ==
=== Bus ===
- 350 Mirrabooka Bus Station to Caversham – serves Benara Road
- 353 Galleria Bus Station to Ballajura Station – serves Beechboro Road
- 354 Galleria Bus Station to Ballajura Station – serves Danube Avenue, Amazon Drive and Beechboro Road
- 355 Galleria Bus Station to Whiteman Park Station – serves Altone Road
- 356 Galleria Bus Station to Ballajura Station – serves Benara Road, Brockmill Avenue, Barlee Way, Cuttler Avenue, Maguire Avenue, Thorburn Avenue and Altone Road

== Schools ==
- Beechboro Primary School
- West Beechboro Primary School
- East Beechboro Primary School
- Beechboro Christian School
