= Bennett Springs, Western Australia =

Suburb of Perth, Western Australia

Bennett Springs Perth, Western Australia
- Coordinates: 31.859°S 115.945°E
- Population: 5,929 (SAL 2021)
- Established: 2011
- Postcode(s): 6063
- LGA(s): City of Swan
- State electorate(s): Bassendean, West Swan
- Federal division(s): Hasluck
Suburbs around Bennett Springs:
Ballajura	Whiteman	West Swan
Malaga	Bennett Springs	Dayton
Noranda	Beechboro	Caversham

Bennett Springs is a northeastern suburb of Perth, Western Australia, located in the City of Swan. Formed from parts of the suburbs of Beechboro, Whiteman and West Swan, it was originally a subdivision from Beechboro until April 2011 when it was gazetted following a 10-year campaign by residents. The suburb was named after Matilda Bennett, the wife of John Septimus Roe.

The suburb is part of the City of Swan's Urban Growth Corridor and is bounded by Drumpellier Drive to the east, Reid Highway to the south, Tonkin Highway to the west and Marshall Road and the former boundary of West Swan to the north. Bennett Brook, also named after Matilda Bennett, runs through part of the suburb.

== Transport ==
=== Bus ===
- 353 and 354 Galleria Bus Station to Ballajura Station – serve Beechboro Road
- 355 Galleria Bus Station to Whiteman Park Station – serves Altone Road and Marshall Road
- 356 Galleria Bus Station to Ballajura Station – serves Altone Road, Bennett Springs Drive, Bridgeman Drive and Beechboro Road
- Future Train station on the Morley-Ellenbrook Line, Bennet springs east.
