= Ballajura railway station =

Railway station in Perth, Western Australia

Ballajura
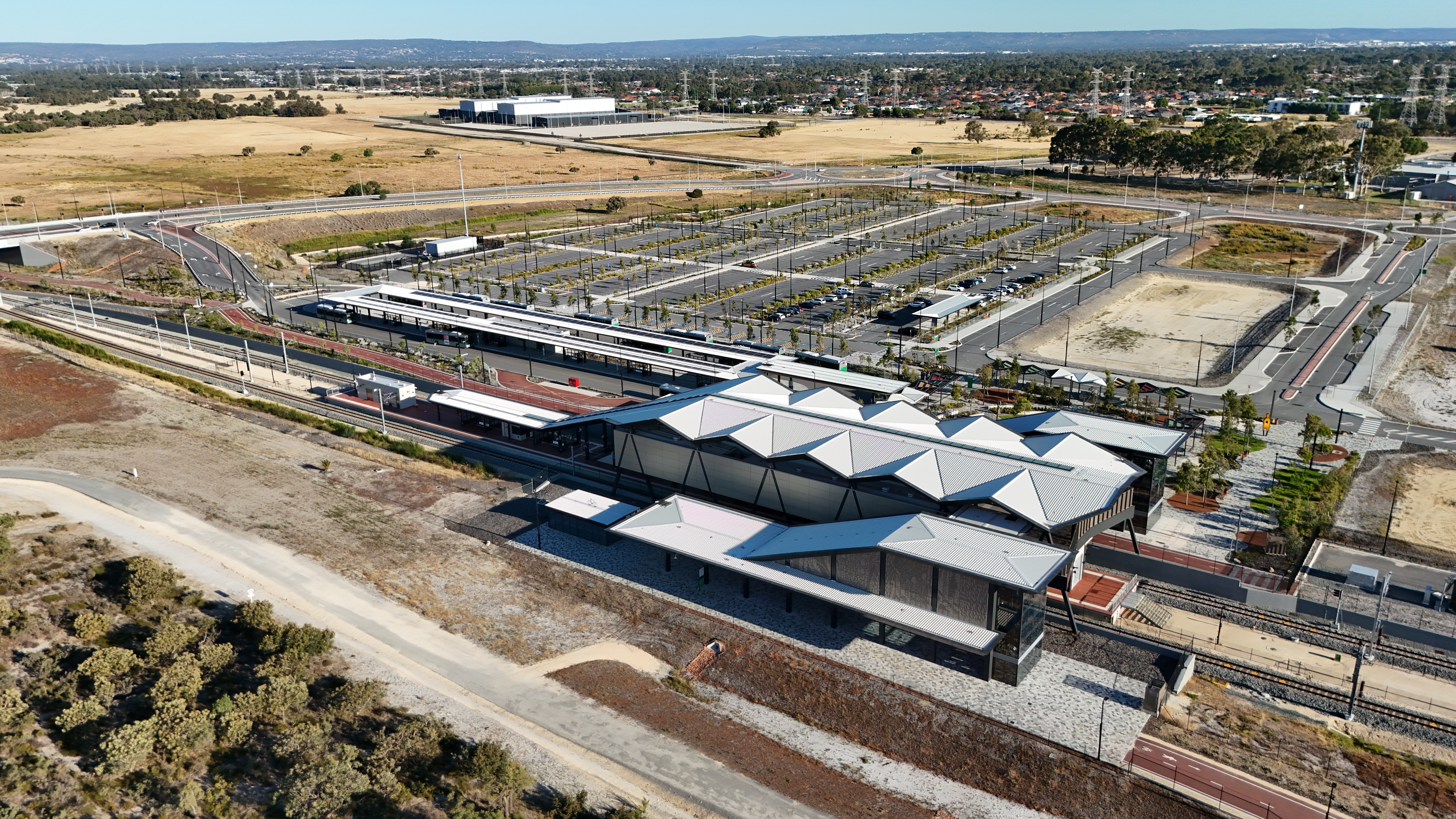
- Aerial view of Ballajura Station in December 2025

General information
- Location: Beechboro Road North, Whiteman; Western Australia; Australia
- Coordinates: 31°50′56″S 115°55′16″E
- Owner: Public Transport Authority
- Operator: Public Transport Authority
- Line: Ellenbrook line
- Platforms: 1 island platform with 2 platform edges
- Tracks: 2
- Bus stands: 12
- Connections: Bus

Construction
- Parking: 1,100 bays
- Cycle facilities: Yes
- Accessible: Yes
- Architect: Woods Bagot

Other information
- Fare zone: 2

History
- Opened: 8 December 2024

Services
Preceding station	Transperth	Following station
Noranda towards Perth	Ellenbrook line	Whiteman Park towards Ellenbrook
Location
- Location of Ballajura station

Ballajura railway station is a suburban railway station on the Ellenbrook line in Perth, Western Australia. The station is located east of Tonkin Highway, north of Marshall Road, and west of Beechboro Road North, within the rural area of Whiteman, and near the residential areas of Ballajura, Beechboro, and Bennett Springs.

Ballajura station consists of an island platform with entrances to the north and south via a bridge. The contract for the construction of the Ellenbrook line was awarded to Laing O'Rourke in October 2020 and construction began in 2022. By July 2024, construction on the station was complete. The Ellenbrook line opened on 8 December 2024.

During peak, trains stop at Ballajura station every twelve minutes in each direction, increasing to every fifteen minutes off-peak and on weekends and public holidays. At night, trains are half-hourly or hourly. A journey to Perth station takes 21 minutes. Feeder bus routes serve the surrounding area.

== Description ==
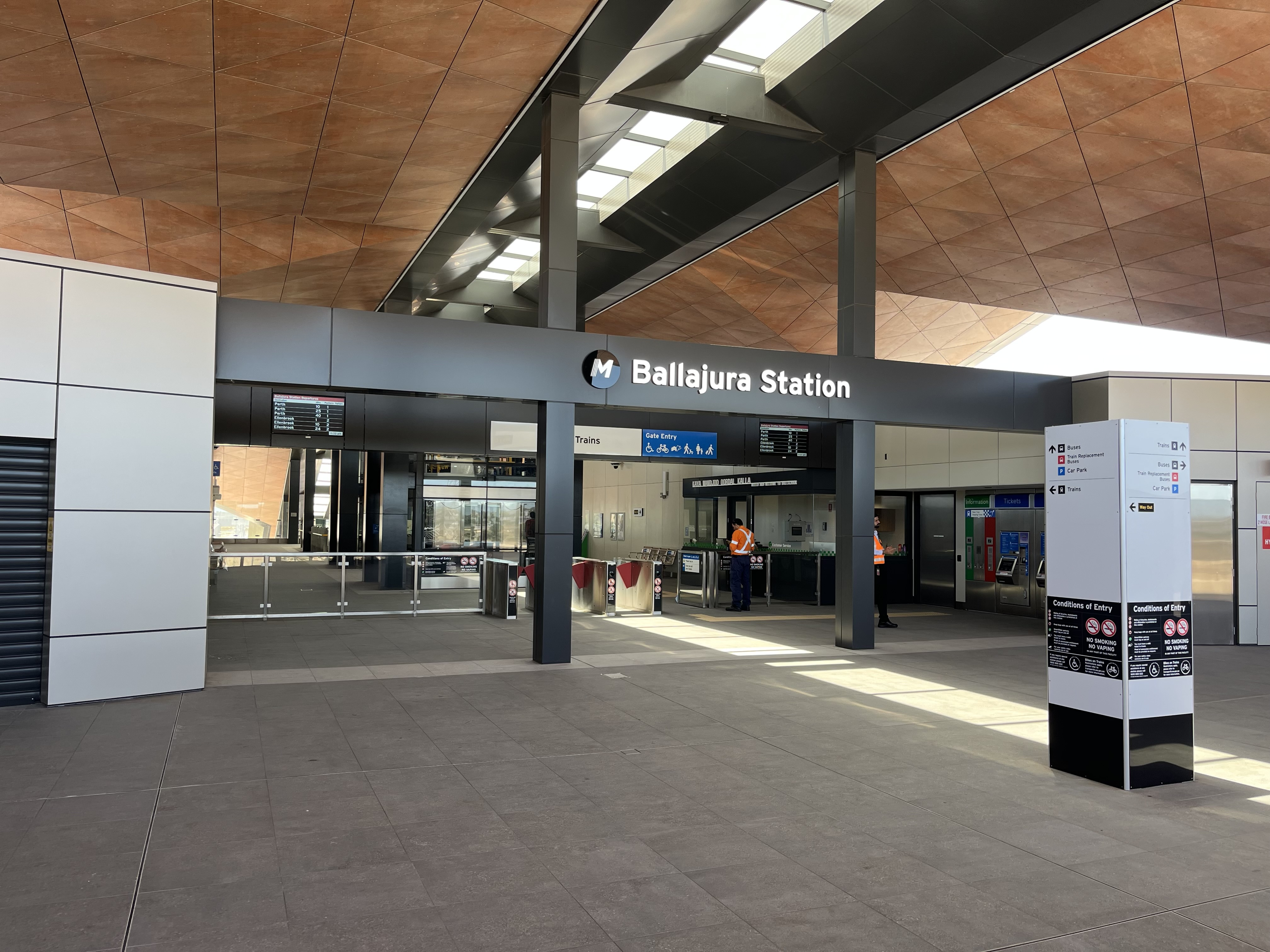
Concourse level before the fare gates

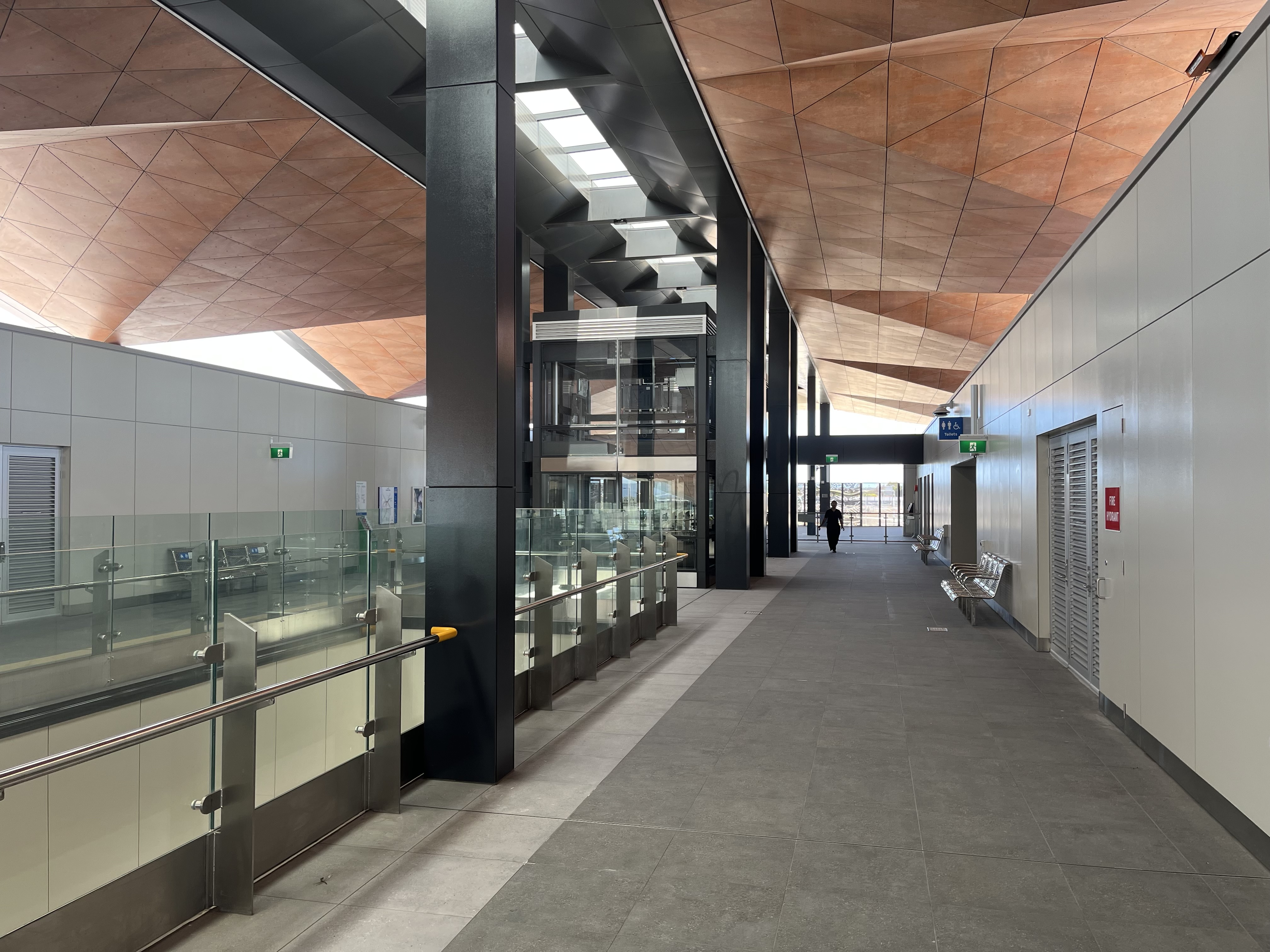
Concourse level after the fare gates

Ballajura station is in Whiteman, a north-western suburb of Perth, Western Australia, just outside the eastern boundary of Ballajura. The region is bounded by Tonkin Highway to the west, Marshall Road to the south, and Beechboro Road North to the east and north. The station is on the Ellenbrook line, which is owned by the Public Transport Authority, a state government agency. It is part of the Transperth system. The adjacent stations are Whiteman Park station to the east and Noranda station to the south. The station is within fare zone two.

Ballajura station has a 150-metre-long (490 ft) island platform, long enough for a B-series or C-series train. The platform is linked to the north and south by a concourse bridge, which is connected to ground level by lifts and stairs, with provisions for escalators to be built in the future. The platform was initially planned to be in a cutting below ground level with the entrance at the concourse level, but this was changed so that the platform is at ground level. Ballajura station was designed to architecturally fit in with the other four stations on the Ellenbrook branch, using the same design language, particularly with the roof geometry and materials used. At the southern entrance is a 12-stand bus interchange and a car park with 1,100 bays. Road access to the station is via Beechboro Road North. Other facilities include a bike shelter, kiosk, and toilets. The station is fully wheelchair accessible.

Before construction, the Ballajura station site was vacant rural land, with the nearest residential and industrial areas on the other side of Tonkin Highway and/or Marshall Road. The land is state owned, and is planned to be redeveloped by the Western Australian Planning Commission. The Ballajura Station Precinct Structure Plan was created to determine how the area will develop, with a draft plan released in 2024. The first planned development in the area was the Perth Film Studios, a screen production facility, which started construction in January 2024 and was opened in January 2026.

To the west of the station, on the other side of Tonkin Highway, is the residential area of Ballajura, which will be connected to the station by a footbridge across the highway. To the south and south-east, on the other side of Marshall Road, are the residential areas of Beechboro and Bennett Springs. To the south-west, on the other side of Marshall Road and Tonkin Highway, is the industrial area of Malaga. To the east is Whiteman Park, a nature reserve and tourism destination.

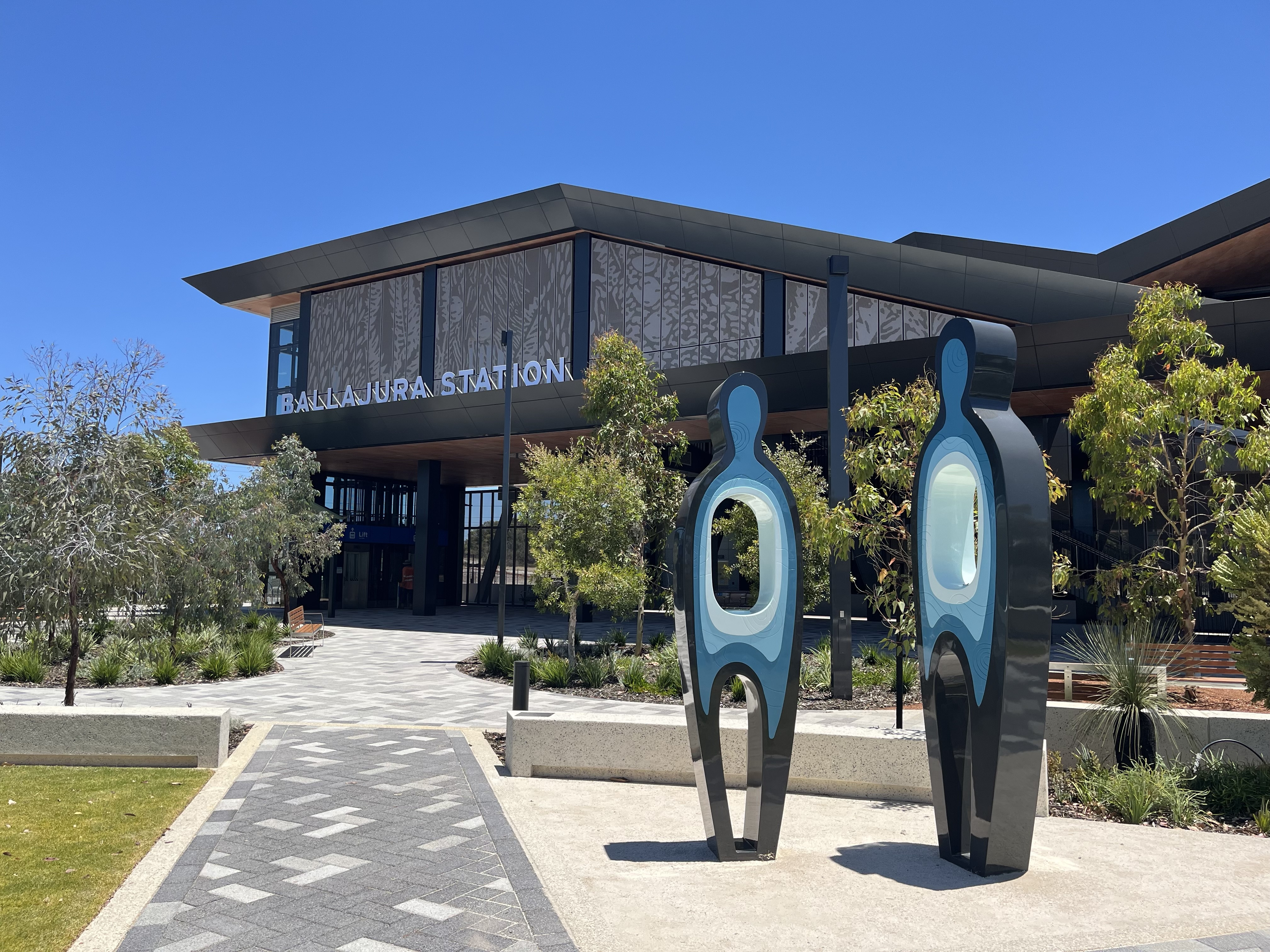
Sculptures by Peter Farmer and Jason Hirst

There are three pieces of public art at Ballajura station. Near the entrances are two pairs of sculptures by Peter Farmer and Jason Hirst representing how the Indigenous Noongar people travelled together in search of food and water sources. On the concourse is a perforated screen artwork by Marcia McGuire. On the screens on the station's façade are an artwork based on banksia trees, by Mark Datodi.

== History ==
During planning and construction, Ballajura station was known as Malaga station and the Ellenbrook line was known as the Morley–Ellenbrook line. Constructing the Ellenbrook line by 2023 as part of the Metronet project was committed to by the Labor Party before it won the 2017 state election. The route of the Ellenbrook line was officially confirmed in August 2019. It had the line running in the median strip of Tonkin Highway north from Bayswater, exiting north of Marshall Road to travel east, with Ballajura station located in the land bounded by Tonkin Highway, Marshall Road, and Beechboro Road North. The A$753 million main construction contract for the Morley–Ellenbrook line was awarded to the MELconnx Consortium, consisting of Laing O'Rourke, in October 2020.

Early works for Ballajura station were underway by August 2021, starting with the set up of site compounds. The first concept designs for the station were revealed in September 2021. The station was designed by lead architects Woods Bagot. Construction was planned to commence in September 2022. Initially, no footbridge to connect Ballajura station to its namesake suburb was planned, but in November 2022, it was announced that a footbridge would be constructed by the Tonkin Gap Alliance, the same alliance that was doing the enabling works for the Morley–Ellenbrook line along Tonkin Highway. The footbridge was a result of a community survey undertaken by Metronet in 2021. By November 2022, construction on Ballajura station's foundations was underway, and piling for the Beechboro Road North bridge was complete. The footbridge's design was revealed to the public in July 2023, as an arch bridge with a span of 90 metres (300 ft). In mid-2023, the roof on the upper level of Ballajura station was being installed. By March 2024, the station was nearly 75 percent complete, with structural works finished and lift installation beginning.

Construction on the station and footbridge had finished by July 2024, when it was announced that the station would be named Ballajura instead of Malaga. The station and the rest of the line were officially opened on Sunday, 8 December 2024 by Prime Minister Anthony Albanese, Premier Roger Cook and Transport Minister Rita Saffioti, with community events held at each of the five new stations.

== Services ==
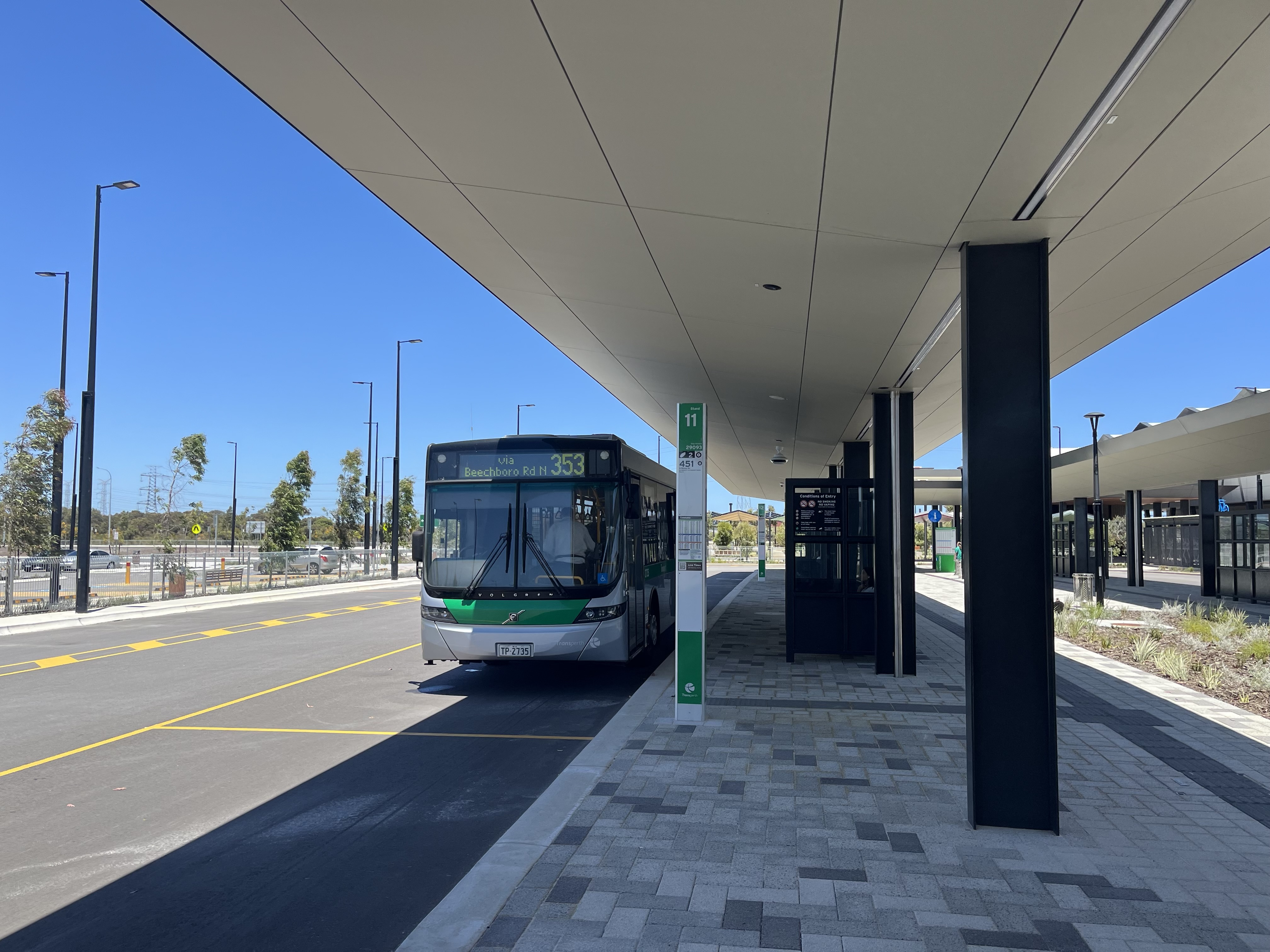
Bus interchange

=== Train services ===
Ballajura station serves Ellenbrook line services, which run between Ellenbrook station and Perth station. These services are part of the Transperth network and are operated by the Public Transport Authority.

During peak, trains stop at Ballajura station every twelve minutes in each direction, increasing to every fifteen minutes off-peak and on weekends and public holidays. At night, trains are half-hourly or hourly. A journey to Perth station takes 21 minutes. It is projected that Ballajura station will have 3,084 daily boardings by 2031.

==== Platforms ====
Ballajura platform arrangement
Stop ID	Platform	Line	Service Pattern	Destination	Via	Notes
99761	1	Ellenbrook line	All stations	Perth		
99762	2	Ellenbrook line	All stations	Ellenbrook		

=== Bus routes ===
Ten regular bus routes serve Ballajura station. Routes 351, 353, 354 and 356 run to Galleria bus station. Routes 362 and 363 run to Mirrabooka bus station. Routes 449, 450 and 451 run to Warwick station. Route 452 runs to Whitfords station. Rail replacement bus services operate as route 903.
