= Drumpellier Drive =

Road in Perth, Western Australia

Drumpellier Drive Western Australia
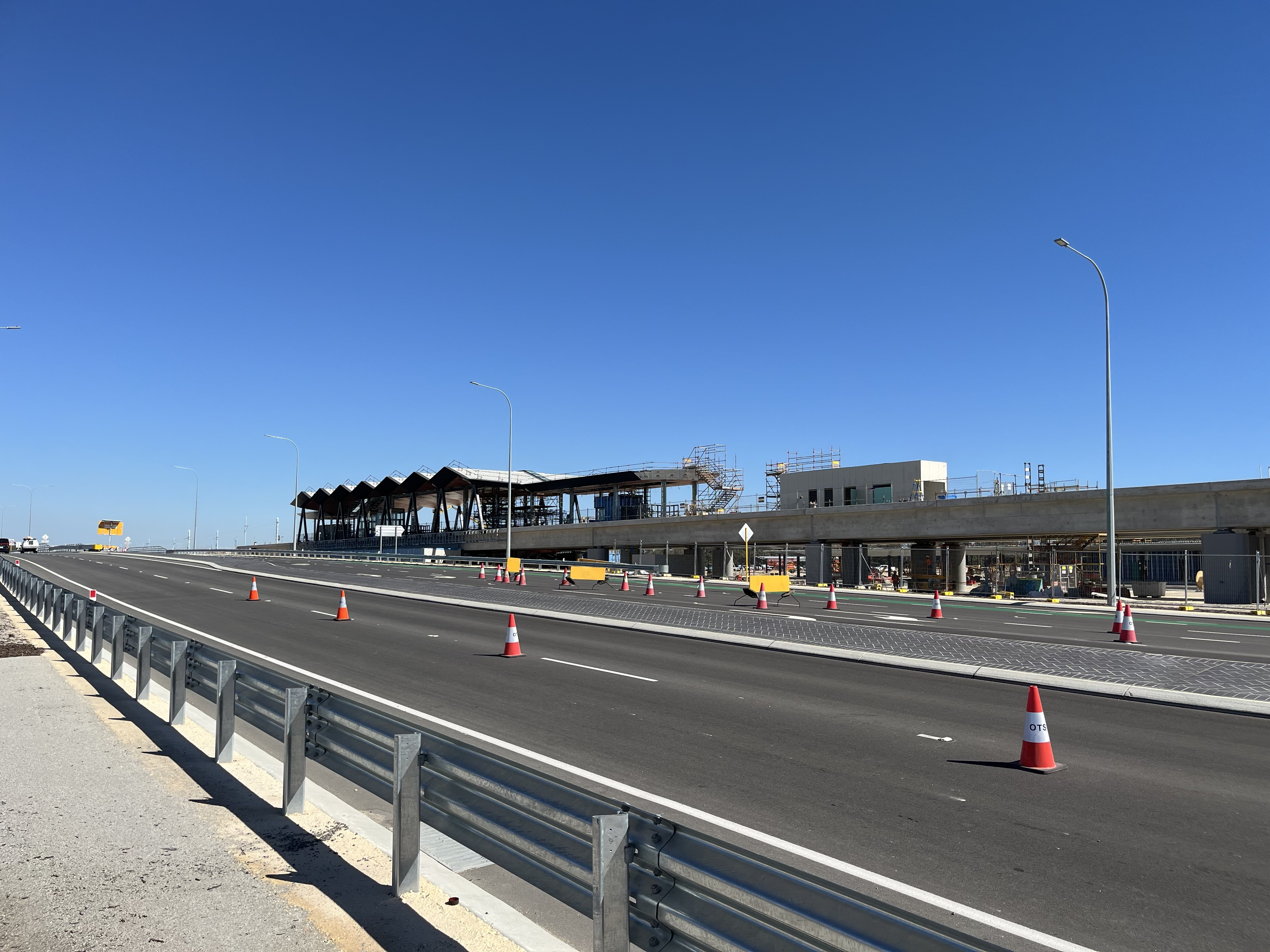
- Drumpellier Drive next to Whiteman Park station

General information
- Type: Road
- Length: 9.9 km (6.2 mi)
- Opened: 1980s

Major junctions
- South end: Reid Highway (State Route 3) / Daviot Road Caversham / Bennett Springs
- Gnangara Road (State Route 84)
- North end: The Promenade Ellenbrook / Lexia

Location(s)
- Major suburbs: Bennett Springs, Dayton, Whiteman, Brabham, Ellenbrook

Drumpellier Drive is a north-south road linking Ellenbrook with Reid Highway in the north-eastern suburbs of Perth, Western Australia. The southern section was opened as Lord Street, and was the main link between Ellenbrook and the rest of Perth until the extension of Tonkin Highway north to Gnangara Road. The road corridor has had several proposals put forward for it, including a highway, a bus rapid transitway and a railway. In 2019, a new alignment for Lord Street south of Gnangara Road opened, and it was renamed to Drumpellier Drive, making the naming consistent with the section of road north of Gnangara Road.

== Route description ==
Drumpellier Drive is a four lane dual carriageway south of Gnangara Road, and a two lane single carriageway north of Gnangara Road. It has a speed limit of 70 kilometres per hour (43 mph) south of Marshall Road, and a speed limit of 80 kilometres per hour (50 mph) north of Marshall Road.

Drumpellier Drive starts off at an intersection with Reid Highway, as a continuation of Daviot Road. From there, the road heads north, between the developing suburbs of Bennett Springs and Dayton. The road then passes to the east of Whiteman Park, and to the west of Caversham Airfield, Brabham and Henley Brook. Drumpellier Drive then passes Gnangara Road, where it heads past Ellenbrook, before terminating at a roundabout with The Promenade. Heading west on The Promenade leads to Tonkin Highway, and heading east on The Promenade leads to the Ellenbrook town centre.

== Name ==
Drumpellier Drive is named after Drumpellier Country Park in Scotland, the birthplace of James Stirling, the first governor of Western Australia.

== History ==
The first section of what is now Drumpellier Drive was an unsealed road along the perimeter of Caversham Airfield, which was constructed during World War II. The first upgrade occurred when the road was sealed and extended down to Marshall Road during the late 1980s. At the same time, another section of the road was constructed between Gnangara Road and Park Street as part of the development of Henley Brook.

In the late 1990s, the two sections of the road were connected up, the road was extended south to Reid Highway and the northern end was converted to a roundabout and extended north as Pinaster Parade. This road would be called Lord Street. It was at this time that the satellite city of Ellenbrook was first being developed, and Lord Street served as one of the main connections between Ellenbrook and the rest of Perth.

In 2005, a new road was constructed from just west of the Lord Street/Gnangara Road roundabout to The Promenade. This road was named Drumpellier Drive and ran along the edge of Ellenbrook before heading towards the Ellenbrook town centre. This section of road was not contiguous with Lord Street.

Between 2009 and 2013, there were 172 crashes at the intersection of Lord Street and Reid Highway. At the time, the intersection had no traffic lights and Reid Highway was two lanes. In June 2014, an $8 million intersection upgrade opened. The upgrade featured traffic lights and widenings for both roads near the intersection.

In 2016, Daviot Road was constructed, linking the southern terminus of Lord Street with Caversham.

=== Perth Darwin National Highway ===
From the 1990s, there has been a road reserve designated for the proposed Perth Darwin National Highway which runs through and alongside Lord Street and Drumpellier Drive. The Swan Valley Bypass was proposed to be built in that road reserve, partially superseding Lord Street and Drumpellier Drive. In 2014, it was decided that the Swan Valley Bypass would be built along a different alignment, west of Whiteman Park. Construction started on the project, called NorthLink WA in June 2017. In March 2019, NorthLink WA opened as Tonkin Highway between Reid Highway and Gnangara Road, reducing traffic along Lord Street. In August 2019, the section of Tonkin Highway between Gnangara Road and The Promenade opened, which caused the intersection of Drumpellier Drive and The Promenade to be modified to a roundabout intersection.

=== Bus route and New Lord Street ===
In July 2011, the state Liberal government's Public Transport in Perth in 2031 plan committed to a bus rapid transit (BRT) service along Lord Street between Ellenbrook and Bassendean station. By August 2012, the design of the BRT route was underway, but in August 2013, it was revealed that the BRT project had been cancelled due to costs increasing from $61 million to $110 million.

In the May 2016 state budget, the Ellenbrook BRT project was revived with a cheaper route. Estimated to cost $49 million, the new route was a 9-kilometre (5.6 mi) dedicated busway along Lord Street between the Ellenbrook town centre and Marshall Road. There would have been bus stations in the Ellenbrook town centre, at Gnangara Road and Marshall Road, with a future station at Youle-Dean Road. The busway would have been grade separated at Gnangara Road, Park Street and Youle-Dean Road, and buses would have continued south of Marshall Road along regular streets to Bassendean and Midland stations. Approximately 2,000 bus passengers travelled along Lord Street every weekday. Sections of Lord Street would have been upgraded and realigned as well. A request for tenders was released in July 2016 and in November 2016, CPB Contractors was selected as the preferred proponent, with the cost by then having risen to $55 million.

In April 2017, the newly elected Labor government scrapped the plans for the dedicated bus road, instead going ahead with the plans for realigning Lord Street, but also upgrading it to a dual carriageway for its entire length. The contract was modified at no extra cost. Lord Street is used by 14,000 vehicles per day, and queues during peak hour can be 2.5 km (1.6 mi) long. In October 2018, construction commenced on the upgrade.

The southern section of New Lord Street between Marshall Road and Park Street opened on 4 April 2019. The northern section of New Lord Street between Park Street and Gnangara Road opened on 12 April 2019. New Lord Street was renamed to Drumpellier Drive, making the name consistent with the northern section of the road. The old sections of Lord Street were renamed to Isoodon Street and Starflower Road, and they became local roads.

== Ellenbrook line ==
From 2022 to 2024, the Ellenbrook line was built partially alongside Drumpellier Drive. The roundabout intersection with Youle-Dean Road was replaced with a traffic light-controlled intersection as part of that. From 19 July 2022 to February 2024, Drumpellier Drive was diverted via Isoodon Street to allow for a pedestrian underpass to be constructed next to Whiteman Park station.

== Future ==
The ultimate plan for the intersection of Reid Highway, Drumpellier Drive and Daviot Road is for a grade separated interchange to be built. There is land set aside for this in the Metropolitan Region Scheme. The expected start of construction is early 2024 and the expected completion is mid-2026.

== Junction list ==
LGA	Location	km	mi	Destinations	Notes
Swan	Caversham–Bennett Springs border	0.0	0.0	Reid Highway (State Route 3) east and west / Daviot Road south – Caversham, Midland, Morley	Drumpellier Drive terminus; Road continues south as Daviot Road; Traffic light controlled intersection
Swan	Bennett Springs	0.7	0.43	Marshall Road – Dayton, Malaga	Roundabout
Swan	Whiteman–Brabham border	3.1	1.9	Whiteman Drive East – Whiteman Park / Youle-Dean Road – Brabham	Traffic light-controlled intersection. Access to Whiteman Park railway station
Swan	Whiteman–Brabham border	5.5	3.4	Park Street – Brabham, Henley Brook	Roundabout
Swan	Ellenbrook–Lexia–Whiteman tripoint	7.6	4.7	Gnangara Road (State Route 84) – Wanneroo, Ellenbrook	Traffic light controlled intersection
Swan	Ellenbrook–Lexia border	9.9	6.2	The Promenade – Bullsbrook, Ellenbrook	Drumpellier Drive terminus; Roundabout

== See also ==
- List of major roads in Perth, Western Australia
