= Lockridge, Western Australia =

Lockridge
- Suburb
- Interactive map of Lockridge
- Coordinates: 31.881°S 115.947°E
- Country: Australia
- State: Western Australia
- City: Perth
- LGA: City of Swan

Government
  - State electorate: Bassendean
  - Federal division: Hasluck

Population
  - Total: 3,322 (SAL 2021)
- Postcode: 6054
Suburbs around Lockridge
Beechboro	Beechboro	Caversham
Kiara	Lockridge	Caversham
Eden Hill	Eden Hill	Eden Hill

Lockridge is a suburb of Perth, in the Bassendean division of Western Australia, and the City of Swan local government area.

Land was first granted in the area to Edward Hamersley in 1837. Lockridge's name is derived from that of Lockeridge House, a property built by Edward Hamersley's son, Samuel Hamersley, in 1874. Part of what is now Lockridge, which became the Pyrton Estate, was bought by the Western Australian government during the Soldier settlement scheme in the 1920s. In 1969, the State Housing Commission purchased 240 acres (97 ha) to begin residential development in the area. An urban renewal project was undertaken in the late 1990s.

At the 2016 Australian census the suburb had a population of 3,467.

Local amenities include Rosher Park, Kiara College, Lockridge Primary School, and the Alice Davoren Community Centre. The Swan Valley Nyungah Community was in the area.

== Transport ==
=== Bus ===
- 355 Whiteman Park Station to Galleria Bus Station – serves Altone Road
- 356 Ballajura Station to Galleria Bus Station – serves Sturtridge Road, Diana Crescent, Rosher Road, Brathwaite Road and Morley Drive
- 357 Whiteman Park Station to Bassendean Station – serves Lord Street
