= Lord Street =

Lord Street may refer to:

- Lord Street, Liverpool, one of the streets in Liverpool, England, that forms the city's main shopping district
- Lord Street, Southport, the main shopping street of Southport, in Merseyside, England
- Lord Street, Perth, a street in Perth, Western Australia
- Drumpellier Drive, a road in Perth, Western Australia formerly known as Lord Street
