= NorthLink WA =

NorthLink WA was a road construction project in Perth, Western Australia, that saw both the northern section of Tonkin Highway upgraded, and the road extended northwards as the Swan Valley Bypass, to bypass Great Northern Highway. These two component projects were separately funded, with both the state and federal governments contributing to each project. Construction commenced in June 2016 and was completed on 23 April 2020.

== Tonkin Highway upgrade ==
The federal government has allocated $140.6 million to grade-separate Tonkin Highway's intersections with Benara Road, Morley Drive and Collier Road. The funding is part of the five-year phase of the Nation Building Program from 2014–15 to 2018–19. The upgrades are intended to improve freight transportation along the highway. The total cost is expected to be $281.2 million. In the lead up to the 2013 Australian federal election, which resulted in a change a government, the Labor candidate for Perth, Alannah MacTiernan, accused the then-opposition's candidate of lying to the electorate over their commitment to the upgrade. The official policy costings did not contain specific funding for the project. However, an opposition spokesperson claimed it was "in the current forward estimates", and not in the costing, as the upgrade was neither a "new and accelerated" project, nor a project that would definitely not be funded.

== Swan Valley Bypass ==
Swan Valley Bypass Western Australia
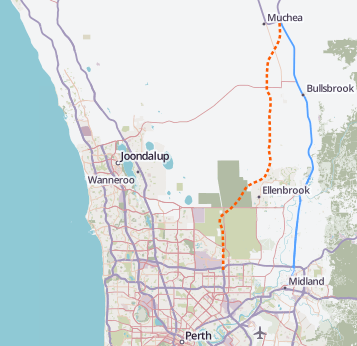
- Map of Perth's north with the proposed bypass in dashed orange, and the existing Great Northern Highway in blue

General information
- Type: Highway

Major junctions
- South end: Reid Highway (State Route 3); Tonkin Highway (State Route 4)
- Hepburn Avenue; Beechboro Road North (State Route 53); Gnangara Road (State Route 84); The Promenade, Ellenbrook; Neaves Road
- North end: Brand Highway (National Route 1); Great Northern Highway (National Highway 95 / National Route 1), Muchea

Location(s)
- Major suburbs: Ellenbrook, Bullsbrook, Muchea

Highway system
- Highways in Australia; National Highway • Freeways in Australia; Highways in Western Australia

The Perth Darwin National Highway (PDNH) Swan Valley Bypass is a highway built to bypass the Great Northern Highway within Perth. From the junction of Reid Highway and Tonkin Highway at Malaga, it heads north towards Ellenbrook, and continues on to Great Northern Highway and Brand Highway in Muchea. The previously planned route of the PDNH, prior to 2012, followed Lord Street, east of Whiteman Park. The state and federal governments allocated funding to the project, with contracts for the central section awarded to the Great Northern Connect Team on 12 January 2017, and contracts for the northern section awarded to CPB Contractors on 30 January 2017. Construction started on the central section on 12 June 2017, and construction on the northern section planned to start late 2017. Construction was completed on 23 April 2020.

== Route ==
=== Central section ===
This section starts at the Reid Highway/Tonkin Highway interchange, which will be upgraded to a cloverstack interchange. Following, to the north, is the Marshall Road flyover, then a two-level roundabout interchange with Hepburn Avenue and Beechboro Road North. Onwards from there is the Baal Street flyover, then at the planned interchange with the Whiteman/Yanchep Highway, the highway veers northeast, meeting up with a partial cloverleaf interchange with Gnangara Road. The highway then follows the edge of Ellenbrook, having a two-level roundabout interchange with The Promenade.

=== Northern section ===
This section was originally planned to be a 2 lane single carriageway with at-grade intersections, but because costs went down, it was changed so it can be constructed as a 4 lane dual carriageway with grade separated interchanges. Continuing on from the roundabout interchange with The Promenade in Ellenbrook, it goes north, passing built up areas in Ellenbrook, then going through rural areas. Along the way are roundabout interchanges with Stock Road and Neaves Road, and a flyover over Muchea South Road and the Midland railway line, and the current Brand Highway, before ending at a roundabout interchange with Great Northern Highway and a new Brand Highway.

== See also ==
- Gateway WA – project to upgrade Tonkin Highway and other roads near Perth Airport
- EastLink WA - a planned road linking Roe Highway in Middle Swan, Perth to Northam
- Perth Freight Link – project to provide a freeway link to the Fremantle port, bypassing Leach Highway
