= Ellenbrook railway station =

Railway station in Perth, Western Australia

Ellenbrook
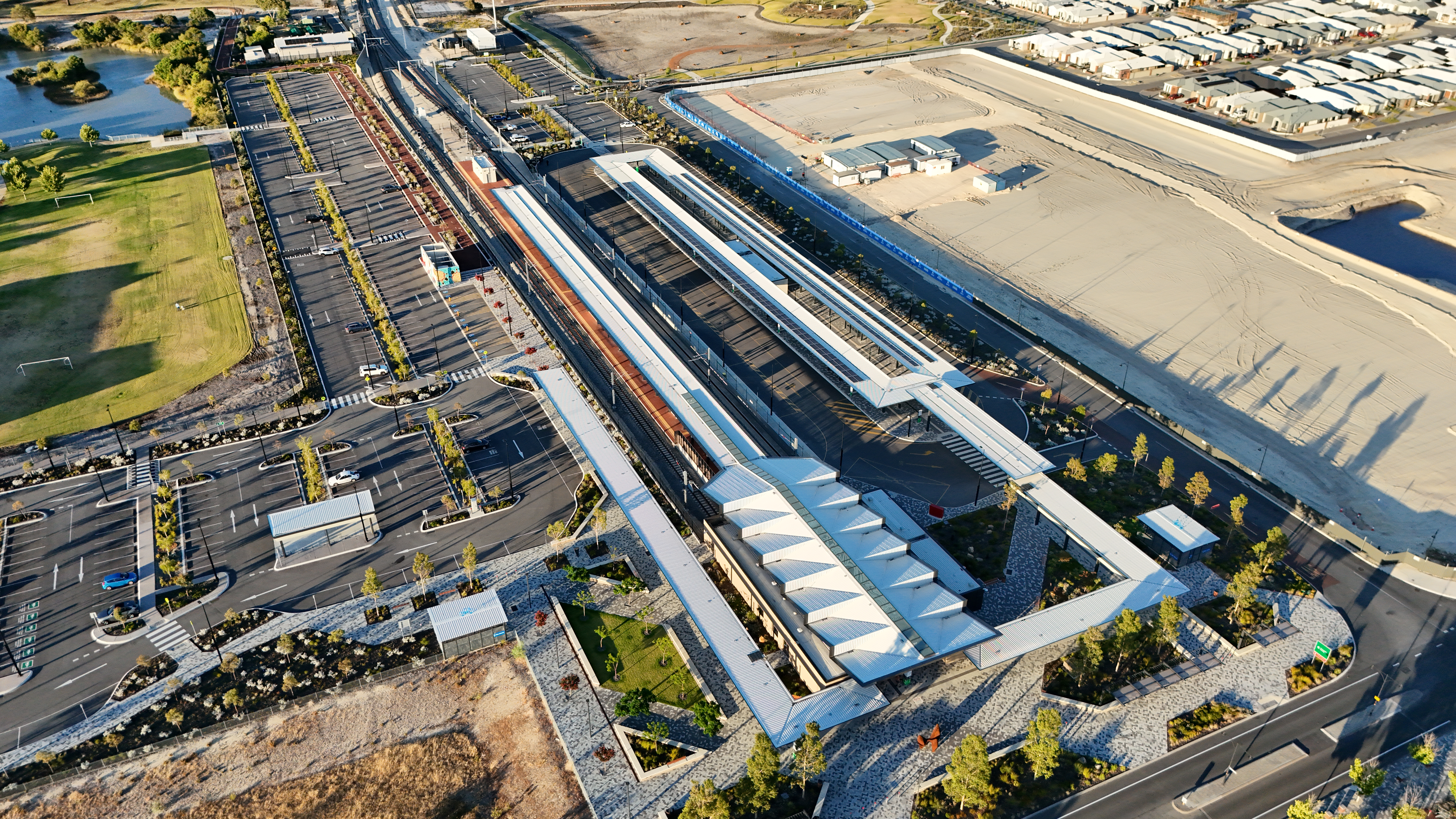
- An aerial view of Ellenbrook station as of January 2026

General information
- Location: The Parkway, Ellenbrook; Western Australia; Australia
- Coordinates: 31°46′55″S 115°57′47″E
- Owner: Public Transport Authority
- Operator: Public Transport Authority
- Line: Ellenbrook line
- Platforms: 1 island platform with 2 platform edges
- Tracks: 2
- Bus stands: 12
- Connections: Bus

Construction
- Parking: 500 bays
- Cycle facilities: Yes
- Accessible: Yes
- Architect: Woods Bagot

Other information
- Fare zone: 3

History
- Opened: 8 December 2024

Passengers
- October 2025: 2,108 per day

Services
Preceding station	Transperth	Following station
Whiteman Park towards Perth	Ellenbrook line	Terminus
Location
- Location of Ellenbrook station

Ellenbrook railway station is a suburban railway station in Ellenbrook, a suburb of Perth, Western Australia. The station is the north-eastern terminus of the Ellenbrook line.

Ellenbrook station consists of a ground-level island platform with a bus interchange and car park. The contract for the construction of the Ellenbrook line was awarded to Laing O'Rourke in October 2020. Construction on Ellenbrook station started in January 2022 and was completed in March 2024, making it the first new station on the Ellenbrook line to begin and complete construction. The station opened alongside the rest of the Ellenbrook line on 8 December 2024.

There are five trains per hour stopping at Ellenbrook station during peak, reducing to four trains per hour outside peak. A journey to Perth station takes 31 minutes. Feeder bus routes serve the surrounding area.

== Description ==
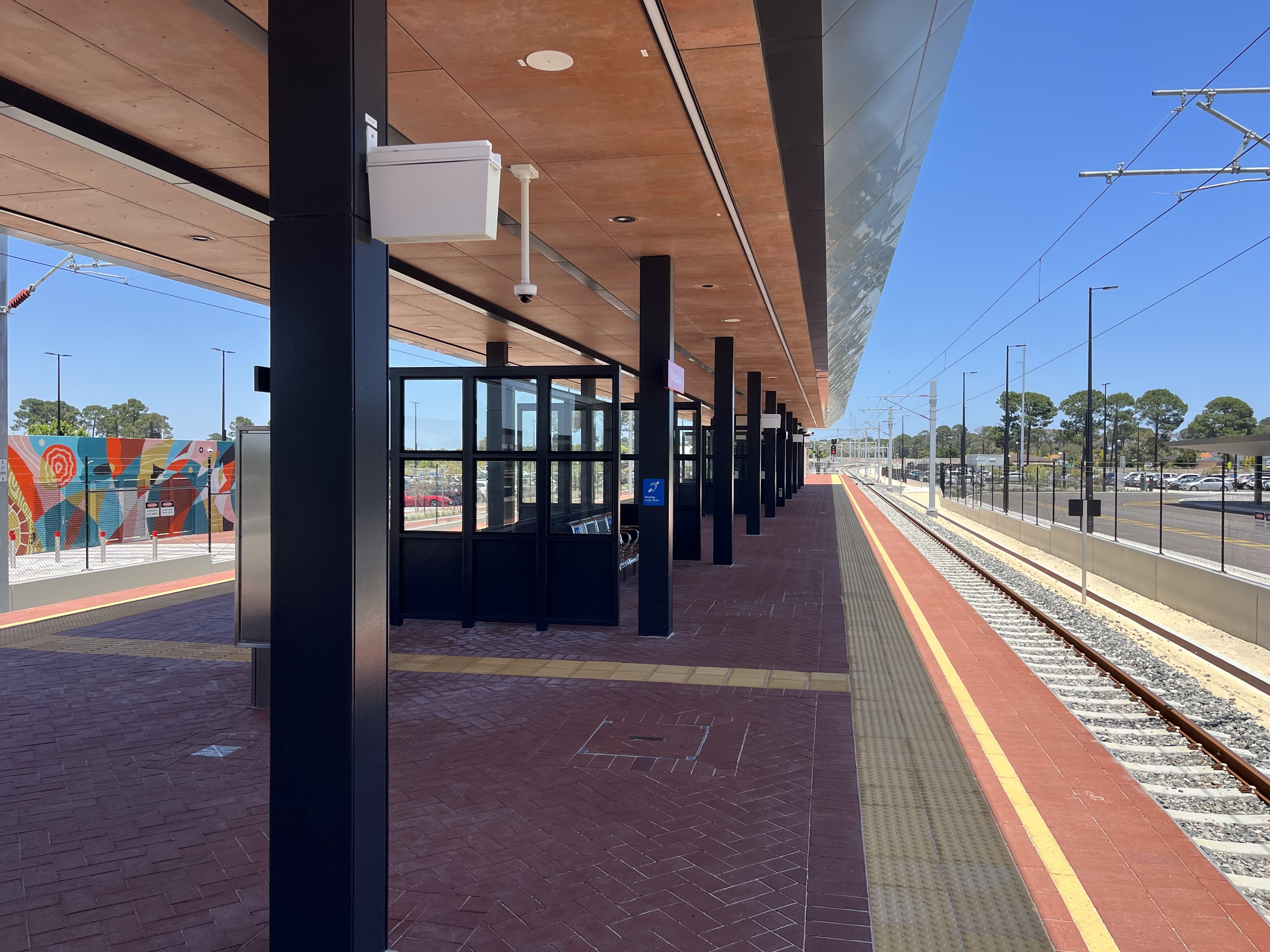
Station platform

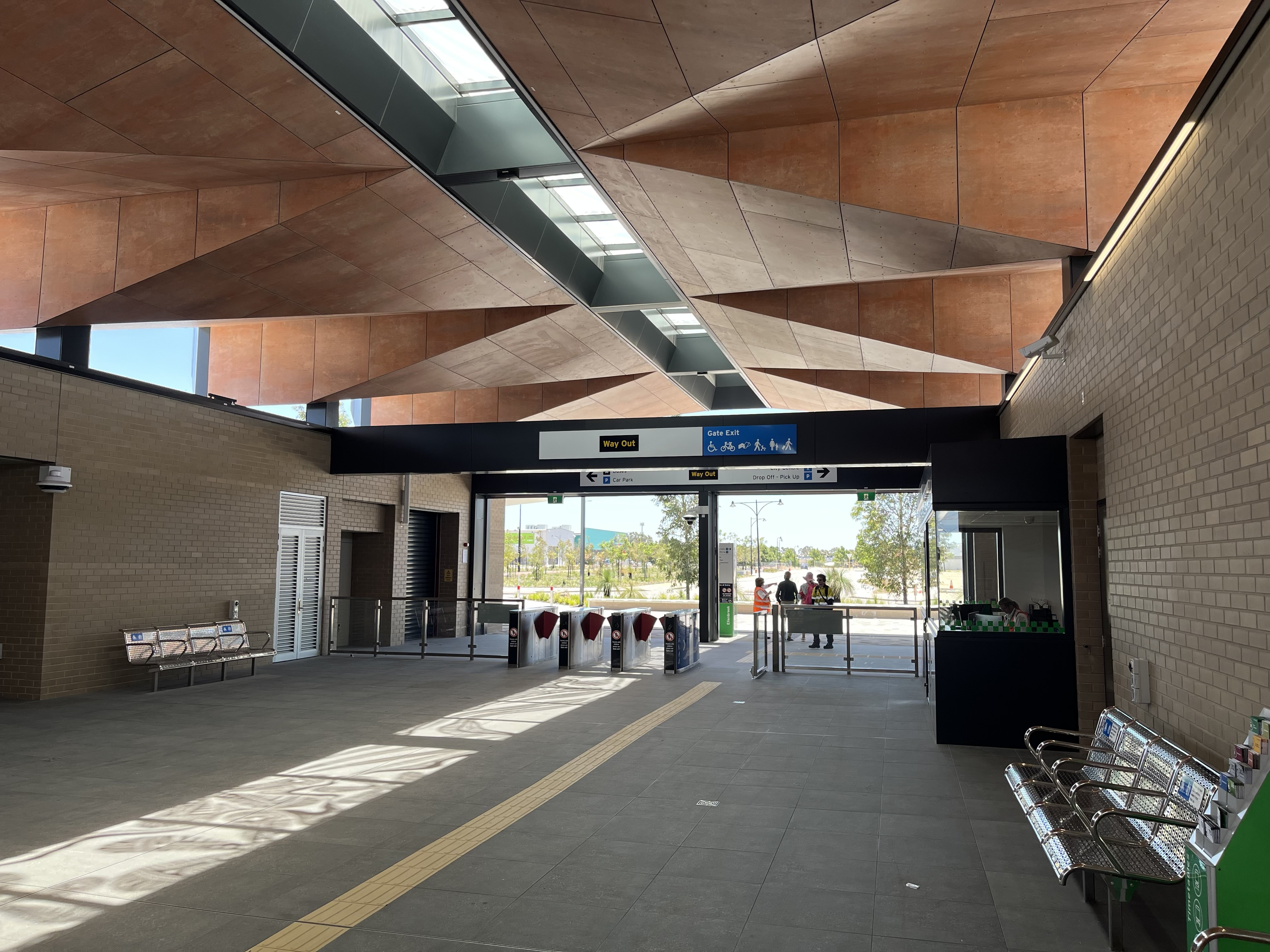
Entrance building

Ellenbrook station is in Ellenbrook, a north-eastern suburb of Perth, Western Australia. The station is on the southern side of The Parkway and the western side of Civic Terrace within a transit corridor reserved in the early 1990s. The station is the north-eastern terminus of the Ellenbrook line, which is owned by the Public Transport Authority, a state government agency. It is part of the Transperth system. The adjacent station to the south is Whiteman Park station. Ellenbrook station is within fare zone three.

Ellenbrook station consists of a 150-metre-long (490 ft) island platform, long enough for a six-car B-series or C-series train. The platform is accessed via an entrance at its northern end on The Parkway. The station was designed to architecturally fit in with the other four stations on the Ellenbrook branch, using the same design language, particularly with the roof geometry and materials used. South-east of the platform is a car park and north-west of the platform is a 12-stand bus interchange and a smaller car park, for a total of approximately 500 bays. Facilities at the station include toilets, a kiosk, and bike shelter. The station is fully wheelchair accessible.

Ellenbrook station is located on the edge of the commercial centre of Ellenbrook. Within 500 metres (1,600 ft) is the Ellenbrook Central shopping centre, Ellenbrook Secondary College, Ellenbrook Christian College, and Ellenbrook Library.

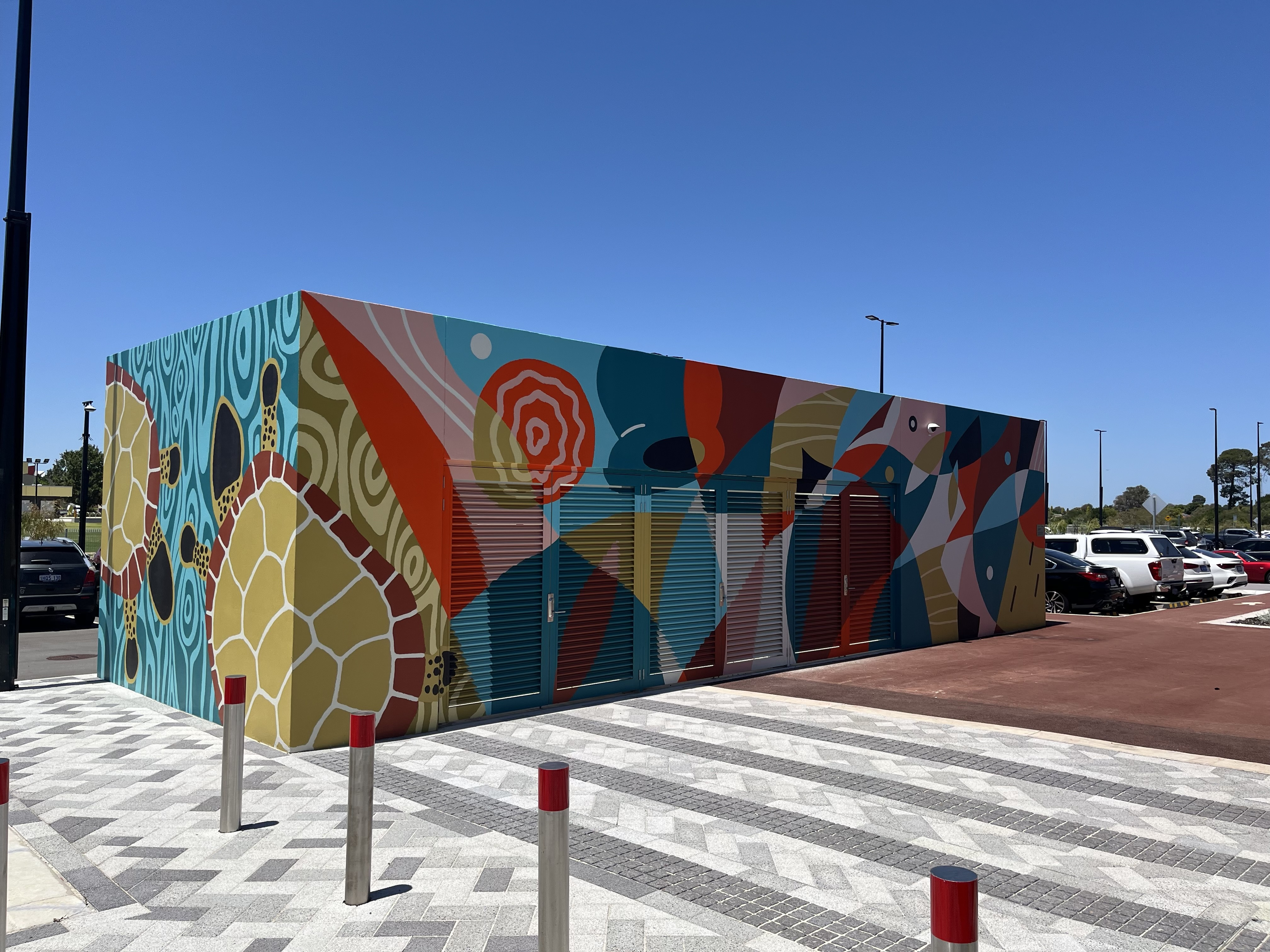
Art by Nathan Corunna and Darren Hutchens

At Ellenbrook station are three pieces of public art by Noongar artists. On metal screens near the station's entrance is art featuring local flora such as the grass tree, gum tree leaves, and peppermint trees by Marcia McGuire. On screens on the platform is art by Kambarni. On an electrical building is art by Nathan Corunna and Darren Hutchens featuring the Rainbow Serpent from Aboriginal mythology, the Bennett Brook, native flora and fauna, and fire.

== History ==
The land for the station was reserved as a railway corridor in the early 1990s during the start of development in Ellenbrook. The Labor Party committed to constructing the Ellenbrook line by 2023 as part of the Metronet project before it won the 2017 state election. During planning and construction, the line was known as the Morley–Ellenbrook line. In March 2018, an 88-metre-tall (289 ft) telecommunications tower for the Dampier to Bunbury Natural Gas Pipeline on the Ellenbrook station site was dismantled at a cost of A$5 million, funded by the New Lord Street project. The route of the Ellenbrook line was officially revealed in August 2019, confirming the location of Ellenbrook station at The Parkway. The $753 million main construction contract for the Morley–Ellenbrook line was awarded to the MELconnx Consortium, consisting of Laing O'Rourke, in October 2020.

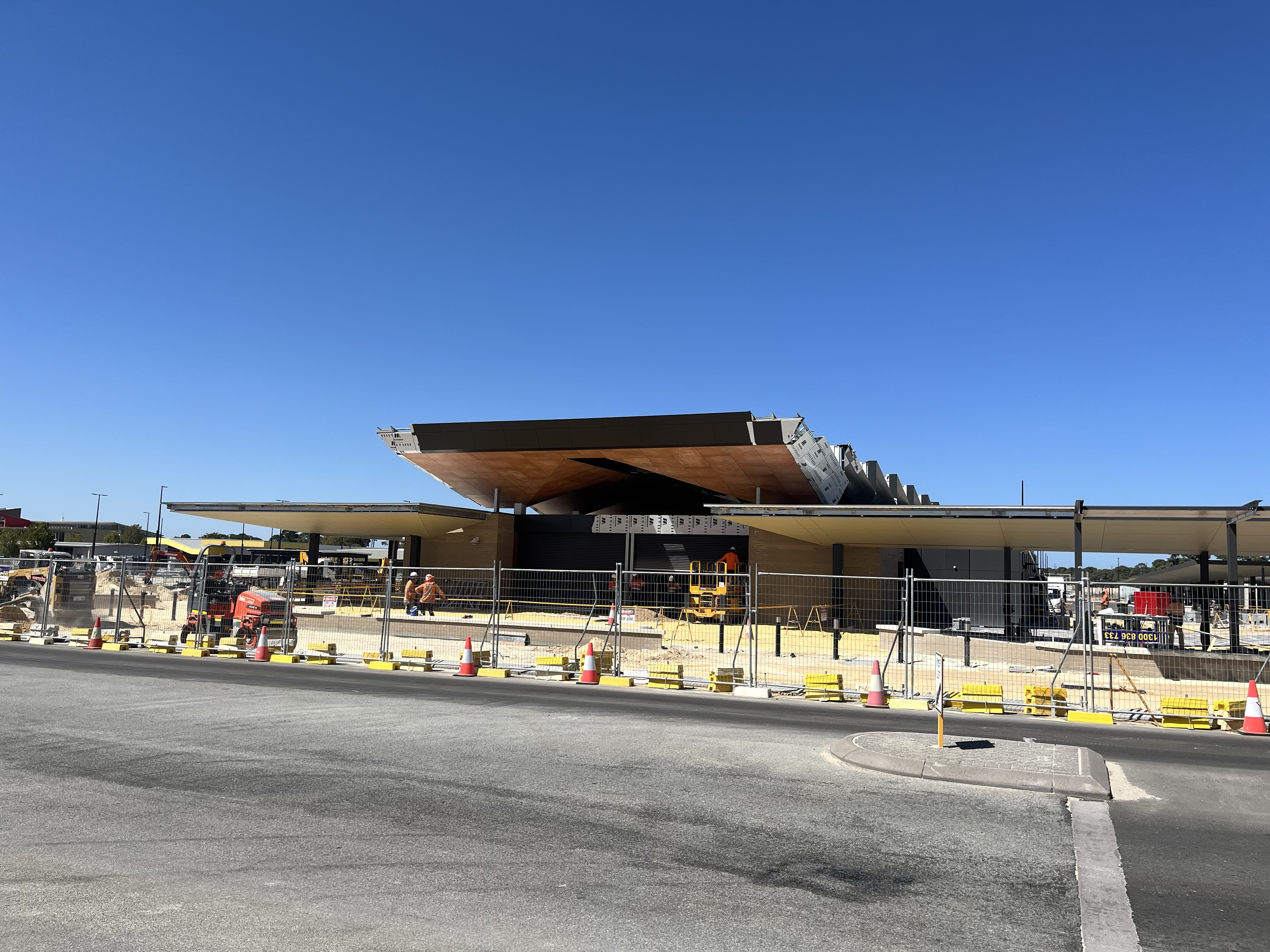
Ellenbrook station under construction, January 2024

The first concept designs for Ellenbrook station were released in July 2021. The station was designed by the architecture firm Woods Bagot. Construction began in January 2022, making it the first new station along the Ellenbrook line to begin construction. By November 2022, the platform foundations and walls were being built, and by July 2023, the station's roof had been installed. On 4 March 2024, it was announced that the station was complete, making it the first station on the Ellenbrook line to be finished. The station and the rest of the line were officially opened on Sunday, 8 December 2024 by Prime Minister Anthony Albanese, Premier Roger Cook and Transport Minister Rita Saffioti, with community events held at each of the five new stations.

== Services ==
Ellenbrook station is served by Ellenbrook line services to Perth station. These services are part of the Transperth network and are operated by the Public Transport Authority. There are five trains per hour stopping at Ellenbrook station during peak, reducing to four trains per hour outside of peak. A journey to Perth station takes 31 minutes. It is projected that Ellenbrook station will have 8,016 daily boardings by 2031; on its first weekday since opening, the station had over 2,000 boardings, and as of October 2025, the station has 2,108 boardings per day.

Eleven regular bus routes serve Ellenbrook station. Route 310 runs to Midland station. Routes 340, 341, 342 and 343 run to various places in Ellenbrook. Route 345 runs to Bullsbrook. This route was somewhat controversial, as it replaced a previous route which ran direct from Bullsbrook to Midland. Route 346 runs to Aveley, routes 347 and 349 run to Whiteman Park station, route 348 runs to Henley Brook, and route 455 runs to Whitfords station. Rail replacement bus services operate as route 903.
