= Whiteman, Western Australia =

Whiteman
- Suburb
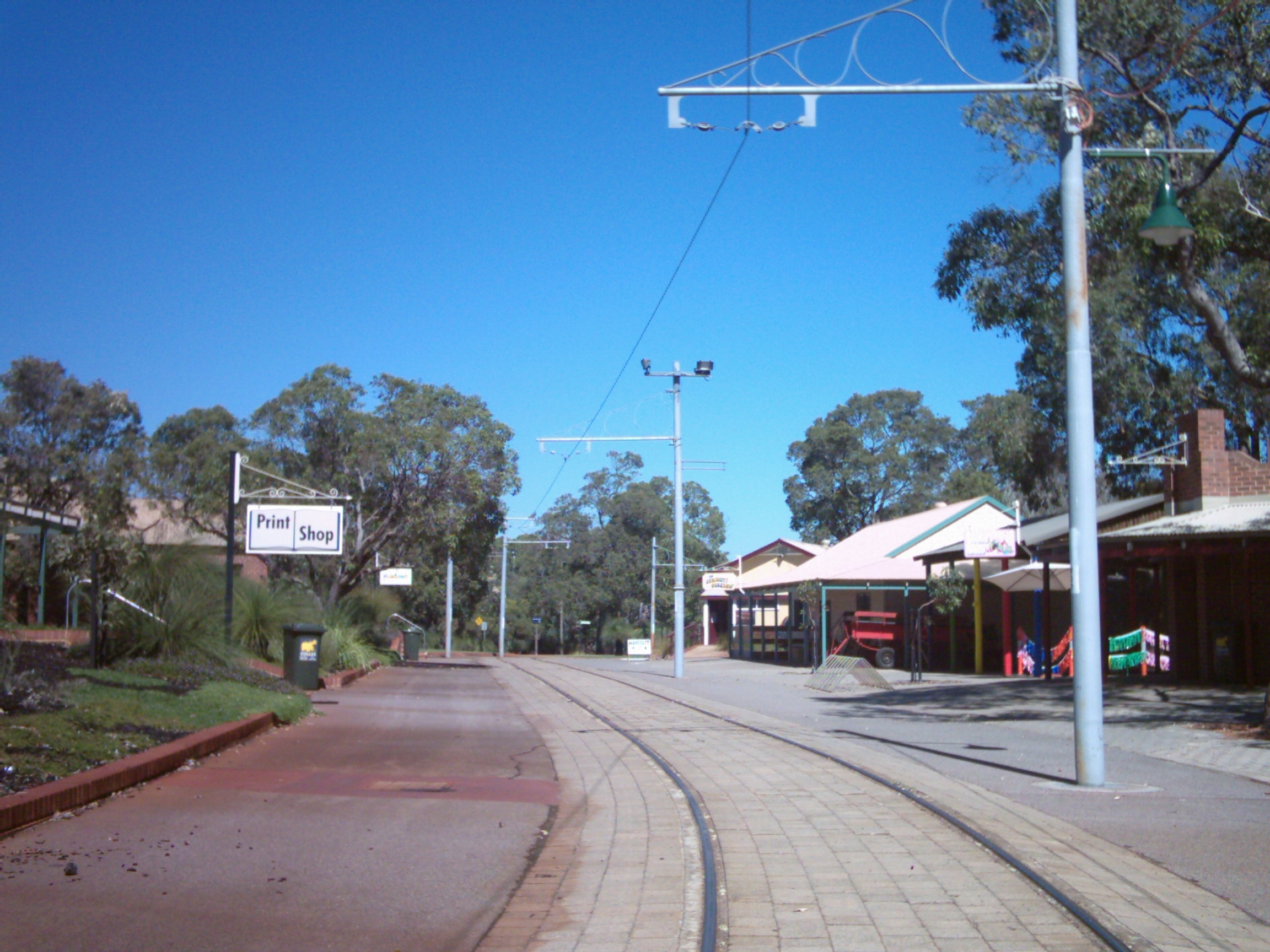
- Whiteman Park Village, with tramway through centre
- Interactive map of Whiteman
- Coordinates: 31.8299°S 115.9408°E
- Country: Australia
- State: Western Australia
- LGA: City of Swan
- Location: 18 km (11 mi) from Perth City

Government
  - State electorate: West Swan
  - Federal division: Hasluck

Population
  - Total: 10 (SAL 2021)
- Postcode: 6068
Suburbs around Whiteman
Lexia	Lexia	Ellenbrook
Cullacabardee	Whiteman	Henley Brook; Brabham
Ballajura; Malaga	Bennett Springs	West Swan; Dayton

Whiteman is a north-eastern locality of Perth, Western Australia, situated 18 kilometres from Perth's central business district. It contains Whiteman Park, which also includes the Caversham Wildlife Park among other attractions. A screen production facility, Perth Film Studios, is located on the southern edge of the suburb.

== Transport ==
Whiteman contains the Whiteman Park railway station on the Ellenbrook line, which traverses the southern and eastern boundaries of the locality. The station serves bus routes 347, 349, 355, 357, 358, and 359. Ballajura Station is also located within the boundaries of Whiteman, and serves as a major transport hub in the area serving bus routes 351, 353, 354, 356, 362, 363, 449, 450, 451 and 452.

=== Bus ===
- 355 Whiteman Park Station to Galleria Bus Station - Serves Marshall Road

=== Train ===
Ellenbrook Line

- Whiteman Park Station
- Ballajura Station

=== Tram ===
Whiteman also contains the only tramway in Perth, with heritage trams operated by the Perth Electric Tramway Society running around Whiteman Park and connecting to Transperth services at Whiteman Park Station.
