= Whiteman Park railway station =

Railway station in Perth, Western Australia

Whiteman Park
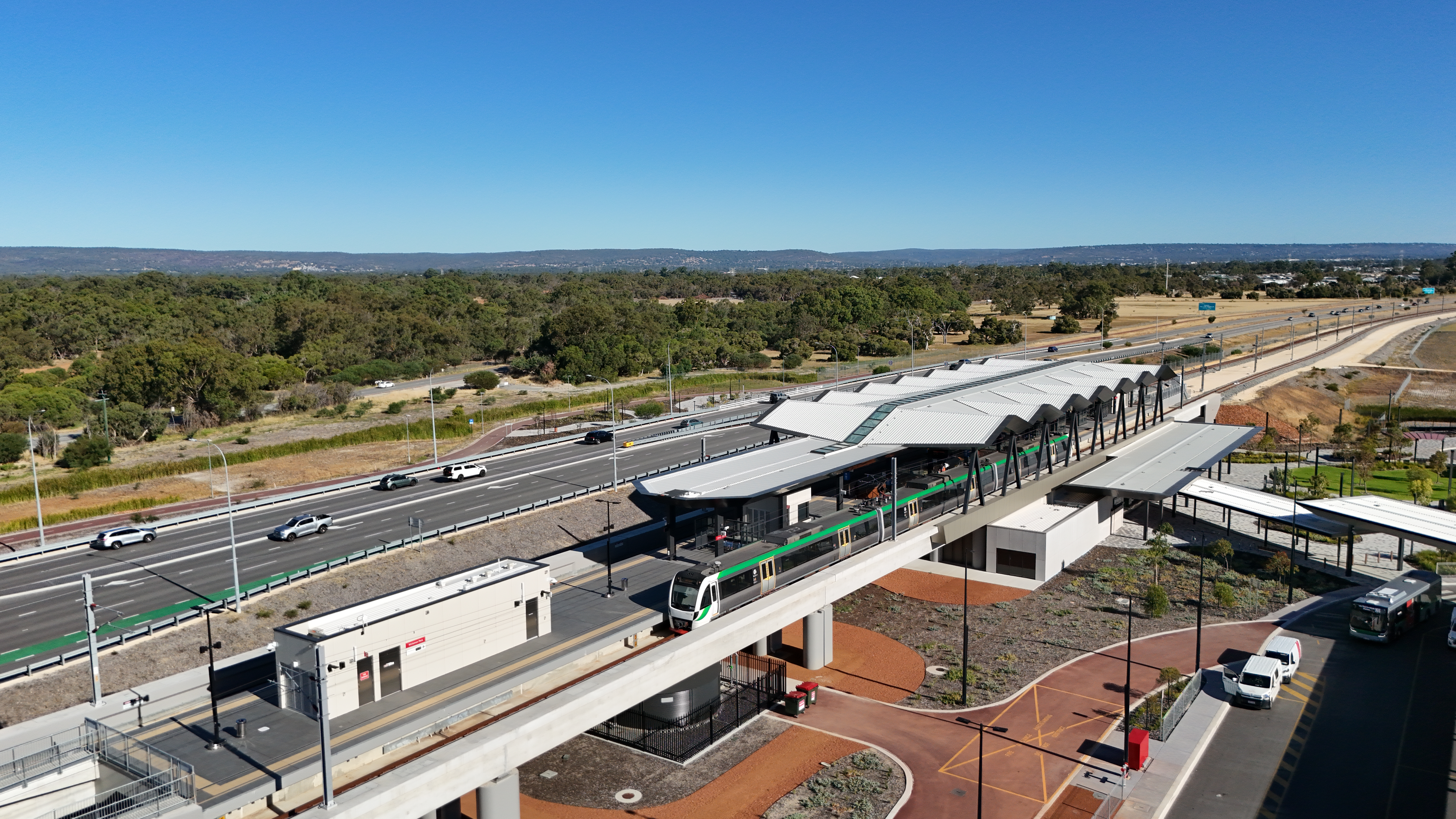
- An aerial shot of Whiteman Park Station as of December 2025

General information
- Location: Corner of Whiteman Drive East & Drumpellier Drive; Whiteman, Western Australia; Australia
- Coordinates: 31°50′09″S 115°57′53″E
- Owner: Public Transport Authority
- Line: Ellenbrook line
- Platforms: 1 island platform with 2 platform edges
- Tracks: 2
- Train operators: Public Transport Authority
- Tram operators: Perth Electric Tramway Society
- Bus stands: 10
- Connections: Bus, heritage tram

Construction
- Structure type: Elevated
- Parking: 900 bays
- Cycle facilities: Yes
- Accessible: Yes
- Architect: Woods Bagot

Other information
- Fare zone: 2

History
- Opened: 8 December 2024

Services
Preceding station	Transperth	Following station
Ballajura towards Perth	Ellenbrook line	Ellenbrook Terminus
Location
- Location of Whiteman Park station

Whiteman Park railway station is a suburban railway station on the Ellenbrook line in Perth, Western Australia. The station is located on the western side of Drumpellier Drive in Whiteman, and serves the surrounding suburbs of Brabham, Dayton, Henley Brook and West Swan, as well as the nature reserve and tourism destination of Whiteman Park.

Whiteman Park station consists of an island platform located on a viaduct. The contract for the construction of the Ellenbrook line was awarded to Laing O'Rourke in October 2020 and construction began in 2022. Throughout 2023, viaduct bridge beams were being installed, and during 2024, cladding and fit out occurred. The station was completed in August 2024 and opened with the rest of the Ellenbrook line on 8 December 2024.

There are five trains per hour stopping at Whiteman Park station during peak, reducing to four trains per hour outside peak. A journey to Perth station takes 26 minutes. Feeder bus routes serve the surrounding area, and a heritage tramway operated by the Perth Electric Tramway Society runs from the station into the core of Whiteman Park.

== Description ==
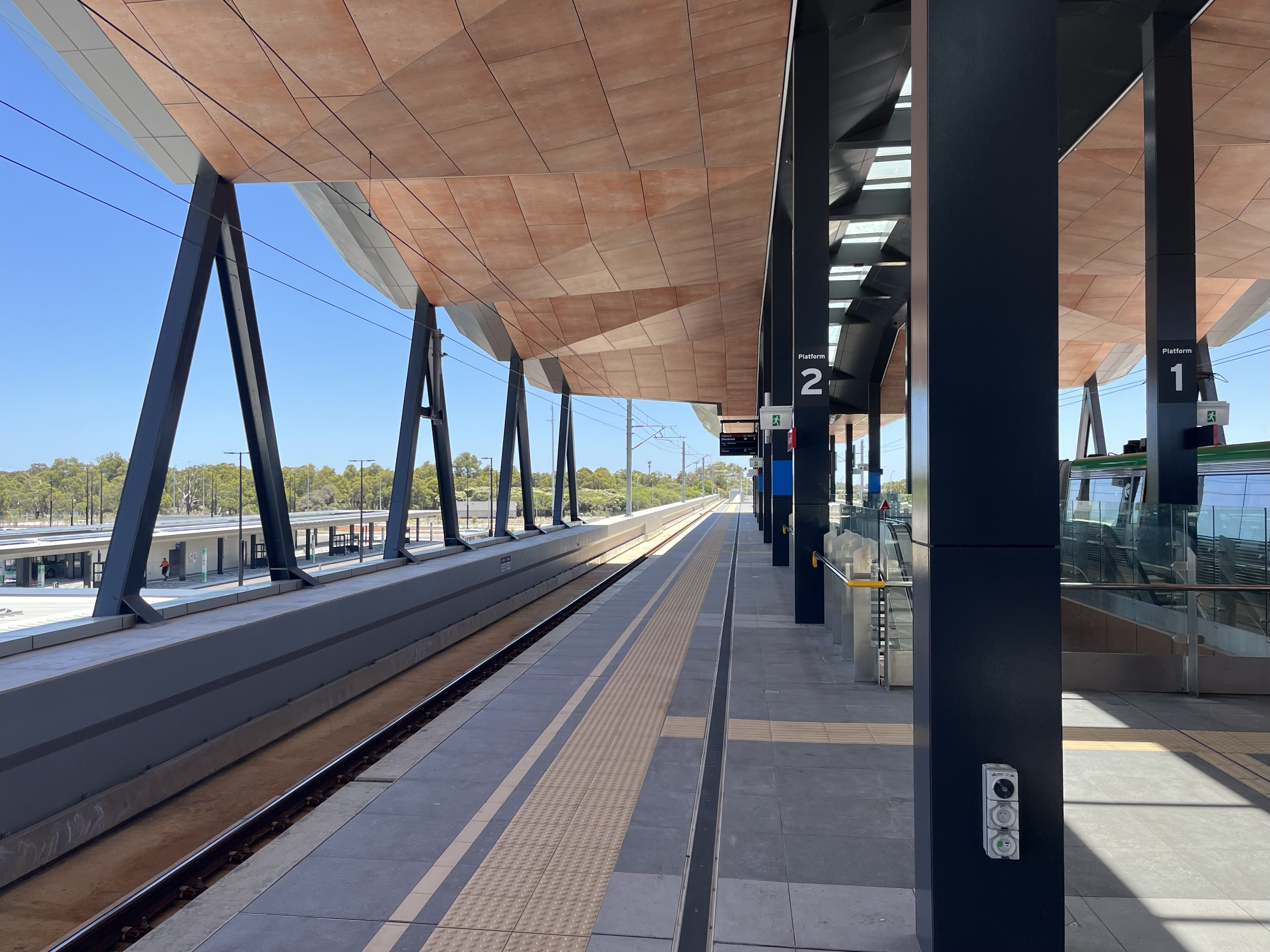
Platform level

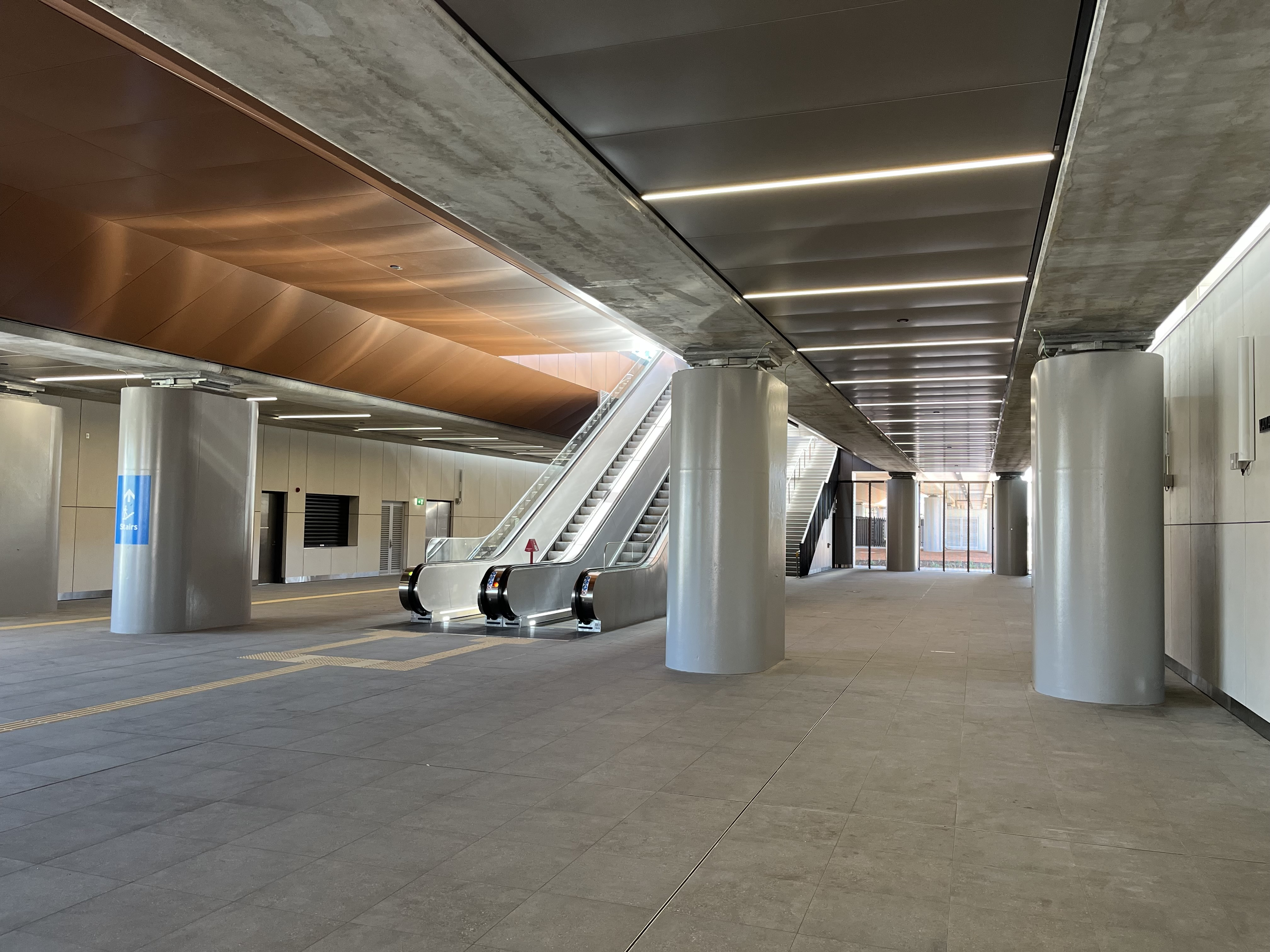
Ground level interior

Whiteman Park station is in Whiteman, a north-western suburb of Perth, Western Australia. The station is located on the western side of Drumpellier Drive, just south of Whiteman Drive East, one of the main entrance roads to Whiteman Park. The station is on the Ellenbrook line, which is part of the Transperth system. The adjacent stations are Ellenbrook station to the north and Ballajura station to the south. The station is within fare zone two.

Whiteman Park station is located on a viaduct so that the Ellenbrook line can bridge over Whiteman Drive East. The station has a 150-metre-long (490 ft) elevated island platform, long enough for a six-car B-series or C-series train. The platform is connected to ground level by lifts, escalators and stairs. The station was designed to architecturally fit in with the other four stations on the Ellenbrook branch, using the same design language, particularly with the roof geometry and materials used. West of the platforms is a ten-stand bus interchange, car park with approximately 900 bays, and a platform for the heritage tramway to Whiteman Park. The car park's footprint was designed to reduce the number of trees cut down. East of the station is a pedestrian underpass passing under Drumpellier Drive which leads to a shared path in Brabham. Facilities at the station include toilets, a kiosk and a bike shelter. The station is fully wheelchair accessible.

Whiteman Park station serves the nearby residential areas of Brabham, Dayton, Henley Brook, West Swan, and the nature reserve and tourism destination of Whiteman Park, which includes Caversham Wildlife Park and various transport-related museums. The land directly east of the station on the other side of Drumpellier Drive is the former Caversham Airfield, which is intended to become a transit-oriented development. The land surrounding the station west of the railway line, which is part of Whiteman Park, is also planned to be developed for "cultural and tourism uses".

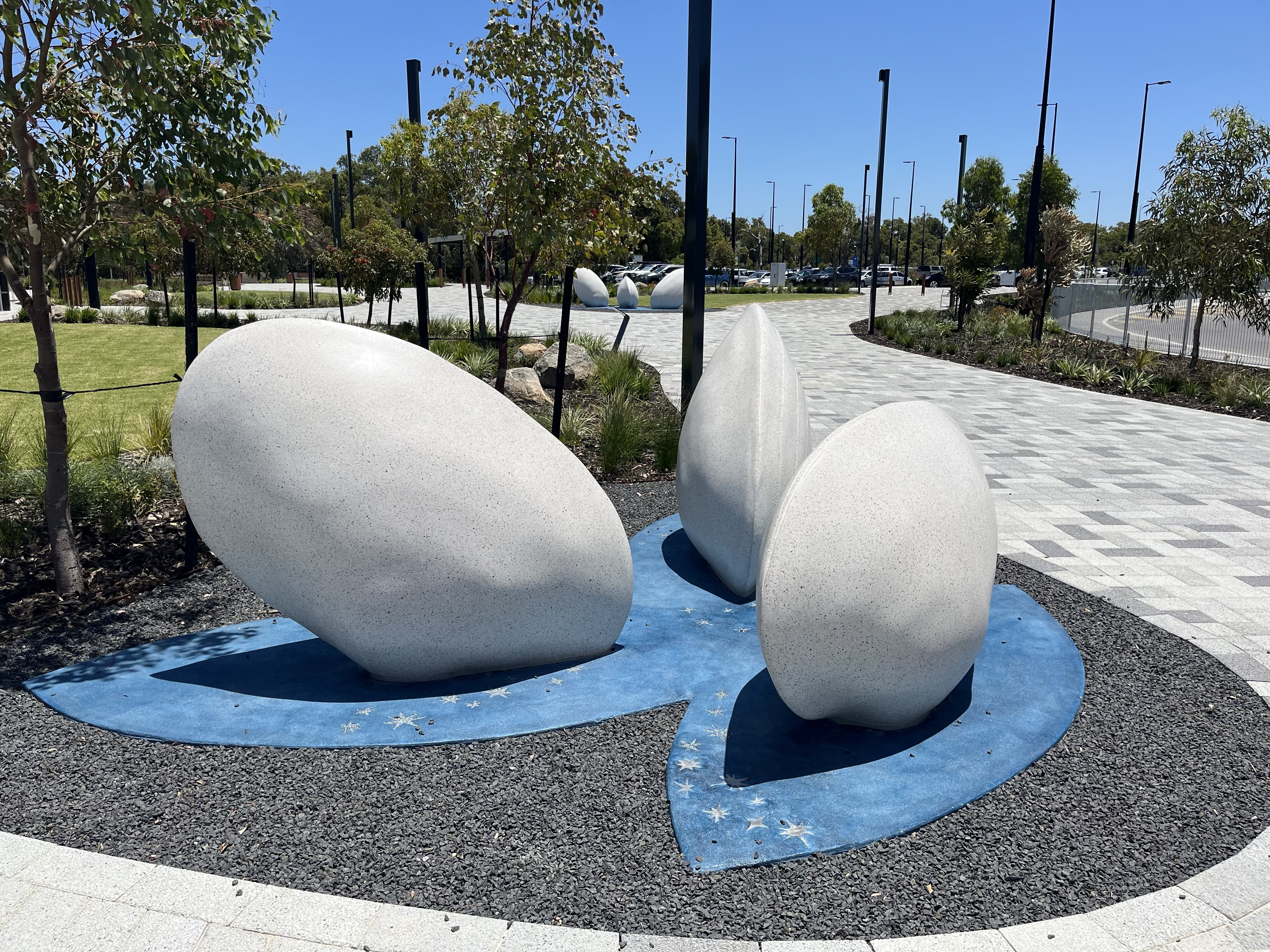
Sculptures of Carter's freshwater mussel

At Whiteman Park station are three pieces of public art. On the walls around the station's entrance is a mural by Jack Bromell featuring three wedge-tailed eagles in flight and "abstract swamp and stout paperbark leaves and flowers". The walls of the Drumpellier Drive underpass have a mural by Rohin Kickett and Haylee Fieldes representing the Bennett Brook and Whiteman Park's native flora and fauna. Surrounding the station are two clusters of sculptures of freshwater mussels, referencing Whiteman Park's Mussell Pool and the Carter's freshwater mussel living within nearby wetlands.

== History ==
Constructing the Ellenbrook line by 2023 as part of the Metronet project was committed to by the Labor Party before it won the 2017 state election. During planning and construction, the line was known as the Morley–Ellenbrook line. The route of the Ellenbrook line was officially confirmed in August 2019. It had the line running along the eastern side of Whiteman Park along Drumpellier Drive, with Whiteman Park station located at the eastern entrance to Whiteman Park. The A$753 million main construction contract for the Morley–Ellenbrook line was awarded to the MELconnx Consortium, consisting of Laing O'Rourke, in October 2020.

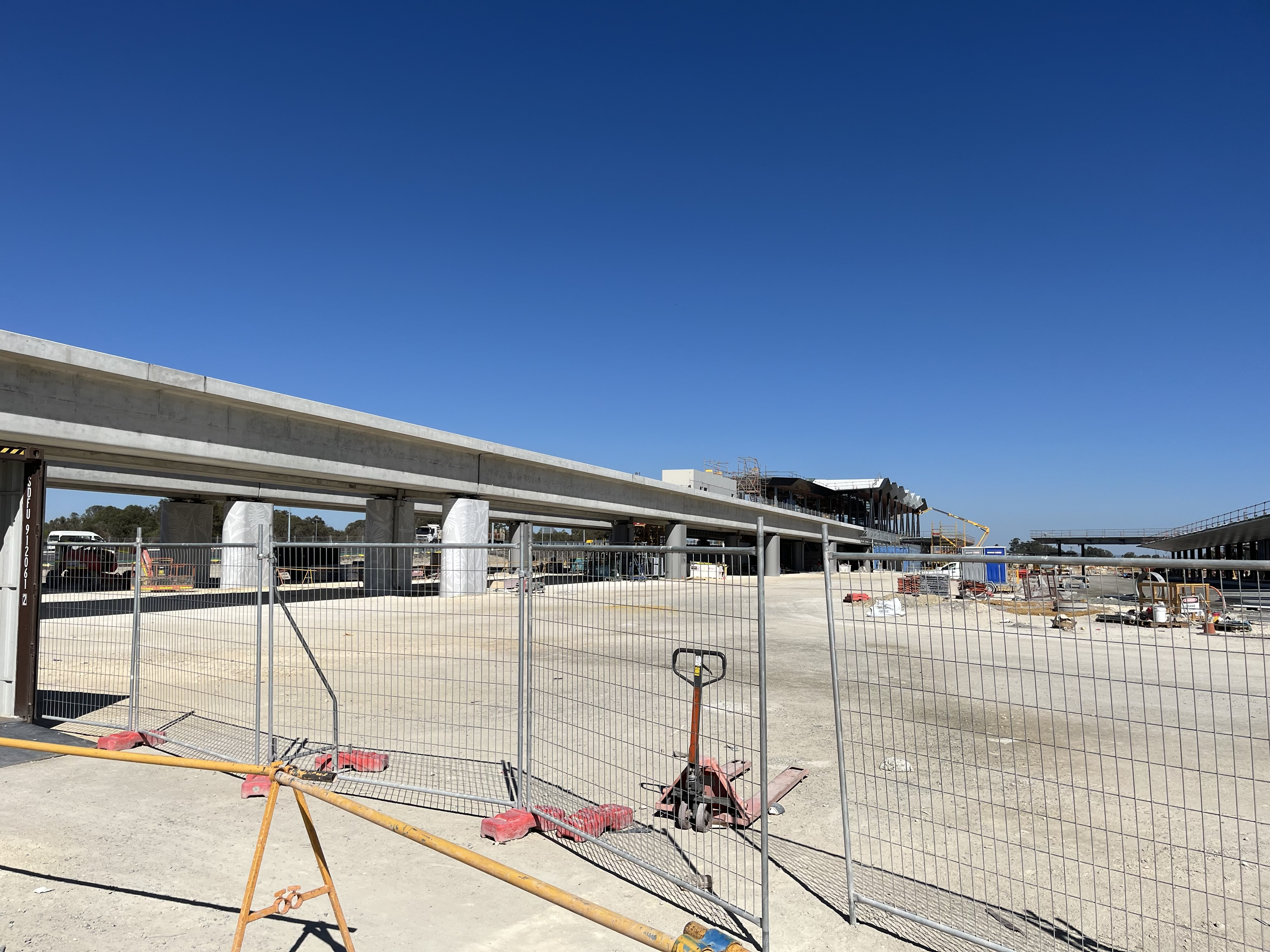
Ellenbrook line viaduct and Whiteman Park station in the background, March 2024

The first concept designs for Whiteman Park station were released in October 2021. By that stage, clearing of vegetation for the station was underway. The station was designed by lead architecture firm Woods Bagot. The first stage was the construction of the foundations for the viaduct. Piling was underway by July 2022 and complete by October 2022. From 19 July 2022 to February 2024, Drumpellier Drive was diverted via Isoodon Street to allow for the elevation of the road for the pedestrian underpass and the lifting of viaduct bridge beams. By June 2023, twelve out of forty viaduct beams had been lifted into place, and as of October 2023, three spans were yet to be completed. By March 2024, structural steel and concrete works were complete and cladding and fit out had commenced. The station reached completion in August 2024, making it the third out of the five stations to finish construction.

A 1.3-kilometre (0.81 mi) extension of the Perth Electric Tramway Society's heritage tramway to Whiteman Park station was announced in February 2024. It was funded by a $1 million contribution by the state government and constructed using 85 percent recycled materials from other Metronet projects and by North Metropolitan TAFE students. To celebrate the opening of the extension, the tram will be free until the end of 2025.

The station and the rest of the line were officially opened on Sunday, 8 December 2024 by Prime Minister Anthony Albanese, Premier Roger Cook and Transport Minister Rita Saffioti, with a community event held at the station.

== Services ==
Whiteman Park station is served by Ellenbrook line services, which run between Ellenbrook station and Perth station. These services are part of the Transperth network and are operated by the Public Transport Authority. There are five trains per hour in each direction stopping at Whiteman Park station during peak, reducing to four trains per hour outside of peak. A journey to Perth station takes 26 minutes. It is projected that Whiteman Park station will have 3,795 daily boardings by 2031; on its first weekday since opening, the station had 820 boardings.

Six regular bus routes serve Whiteman Park station. Routes 347 and 349 run to Ellenbrook station. Route 355 runs to Galleria bus station. Route 357 runs to Bassendean station. Routes 358 and 359 run to Midland station. Rail replacement bus services operate as route 903. The heritage tramway runs to Whiteman Park.
