= Galleria bus station =

Bus station in Perth, Western Australia

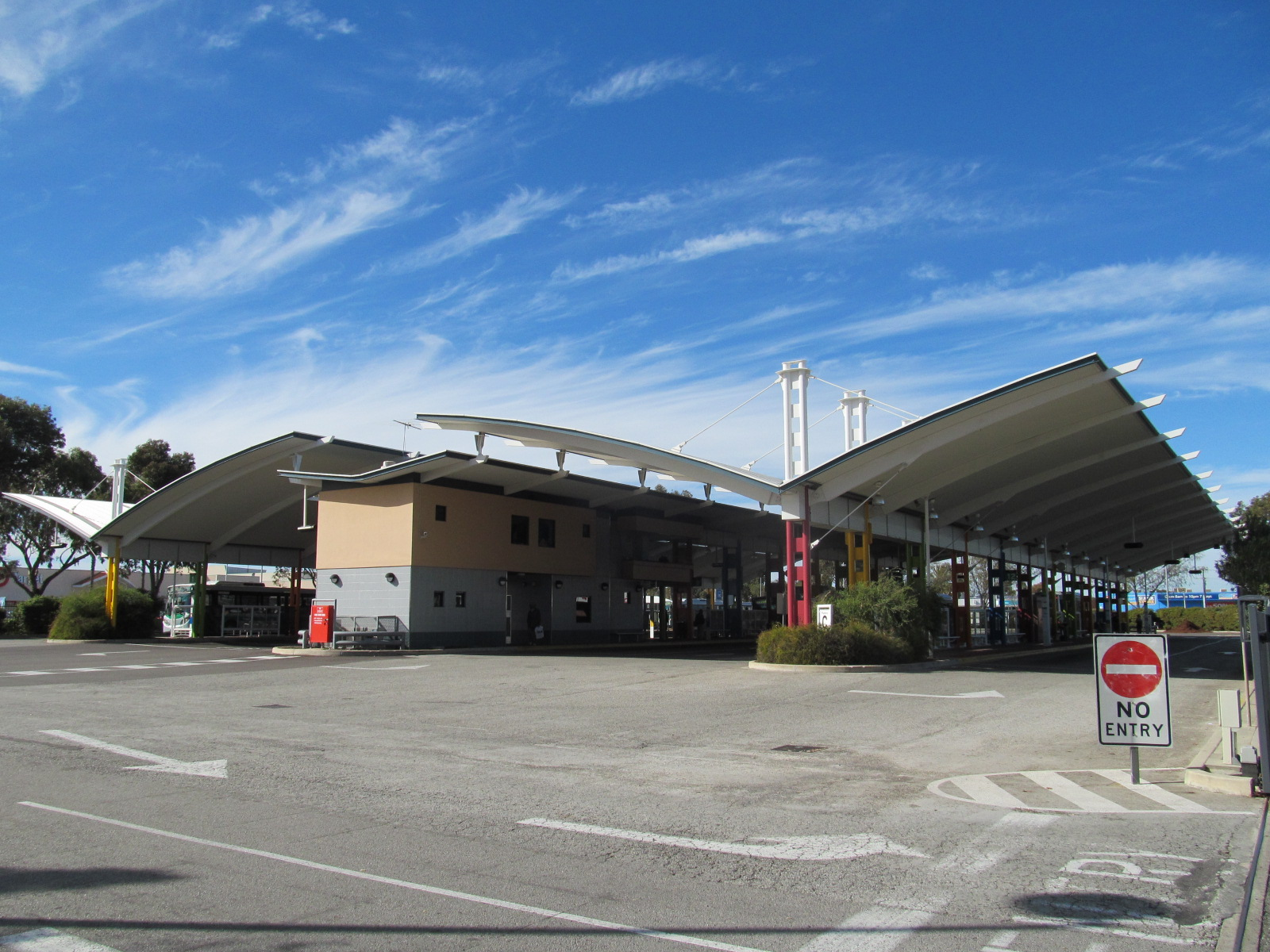

General information
- Location: Russell Street, Morley; Western Australia; Australia
- Coordinates: 31°53′56″S 115°53′53″E
- Owner: Public Transport Authority
- Operator: Transperth
- Bus routes: 15
- Bus stands: 17

Other information
- Fare zone: 1

History
- Opened: 1 July 1994
Location

Galleria bus station, formerly Morley bus station, is a Transperth bus station located next to the Galleria Shopping Centre in Morley, Western Australia. It has 17 stands and is served by 17 Transperth routes operated by Path Transit, Swan Transit and Transdev WA.

== History ==
Galleria bus station was opened as Morley bus station in August 1972 as the first bus station in the Perth metropolitan area. On 20 August 1972, an express bus route from the bus station to the central business district was introduced, the first of a series of such routes radiating from the central business district to suburban bus stations. The route was described as an "experiment".

The current bus station was opened on 1 July 1994 by Stephen Smith, the federal member for Perth. The ceremony was also attended by Eric Charlton, the state government's Minister for Transport.

The bus station was renamed Galleria bus station on 9 December 2024. It was renamed following the opening of the similarly named Morley railway station and bus interchange on the south-eastern edge of the suburb on Tonkin Highway and Broun Avenue.

While there has never been a park and ride facility at the Galleria bus station, bus passengers would generally use an adjacent carpark at the Galleria Shopping Centre. However, in 2011 the centre started chaining off this carpark, leaving passengers with no parking at one of the busiest bus stations in Perth. As of 2024, the shopping centre enforces a three-hour parking limit.

== Bus routes ==
=== Platform A ===
Stop	Route	Destination / description	Notes
Stand 1	998	CircleRoute to Fremantle station via Ascot Racecourse & Belmont Forum	Limited stops
Stand 2	40	to Elizabeth Quay Bus Station via Guildford Road	
Stand 3	975	to Bayswater station via Beechboro Road South	High frequency
Stand 4	999	CircleRoute to Fremantle station via Tuart Hill & Yokine	Limited stops

=== Platform B ===
Stop	Route	Destination / description	Notes
Stand 5	980	to Elizabeth Quay Bus Station via Walter Road West & North Street	High frequency
Stand 6	950	to Morley Station via Walter Road	High frequency
Stand 6	950X	to Morley Station via Walter Road	Limited Stops
Stand 7	637	to Perth Oval	Special event services
Stand 7	653	to Perth Stadium via Beaufort Street	Special event services
Stand 8			Set down only
Stand 9	353	to Ballajura Station via Morley Station & Beechboro Road North	
Stand 10	354	to Ballajura Station via Broun Avenue, Morley Station, Bottlebrush Drive & Amazon Drive	
Stand 11	356	to Ballajura Station via Broun Avenue, Morley Station, Bassendean station, Sturtridge Road & Bennett Springs Drive	
Stand 12	355	to Whiteman Park Station via Collier Road, Broadway, Bassendean station & Altone Road	

=== Platform C ===
Stop	Route	Destination / description	Notes
Stand 13	351	to Ballajura Station via Crimea Street, Malaga Drive & Bellefin Drive	
Stand 14	352	to Morley Station via McGilvray Avenue, Emberson Road & Bath Road	
Stand 15	20	to Edith Cowan University Mount Lawley via Light Street, The Strand & Freedman Road	
Stand 15	361	to Alexander Heights via Morley Senior High School and Illawarra Crescent	
Stand 16	975	to Warwick station via Mirrabooka bus station	High frequency
