= West Swan, Western Australia =

West Swan
- Suburb
- Interactive map of West Swan
- Coordinates: 31.85°S 115.977°E
- Country: Australia
- State: Western Australia
- City: Perth
- LGA: City of Swan

Government
  - State electorate: West Swan
  - Federal division: Hasluck

Population
  - Total: 786 (SAL 2021)
- Postcode: 6055
Suburbs around West Swan
| Whiteman | Brabham | Herne Hill |
| Dayton | West Swan | Middle Swan |
| Bennett Springs | Caversham | Middle Swan |

West Swan is a suburb of Perth, Western Australia, located in the City of Swan local government area. It lies west of the Swan River, and east of the former Caversham Motor Racing Circuit. The suburb is traversed by the West Swan Road, one of the main routes in the Swan Valley winery area. At the 2021 Australian census the suburb had a population of 786.

== History ==
West Swan is located on the western side of the Swan River. Of significance to the area is the Caversham Airfield, now known as the Middle Swan Airfield military facility. Originally built in 1943 to prevent possible invasion by the Japanese, the aerodrome later became a motor racing circuit, playing host to two Australian Grand Prix and the Six Hour Le Mans endurance race from 1955 to 1968.

Bandyup Women's Prison is located on the northern side of Roe Highway, and on the southern side of the Swan River in West Swan.

== Transport ==
=== Bus ===
- 335 Midland Station to Ellenbrook Central – serves West Swan Road
