= Whiteman Park =

Bushland reserve in north of Perth, Western Australia

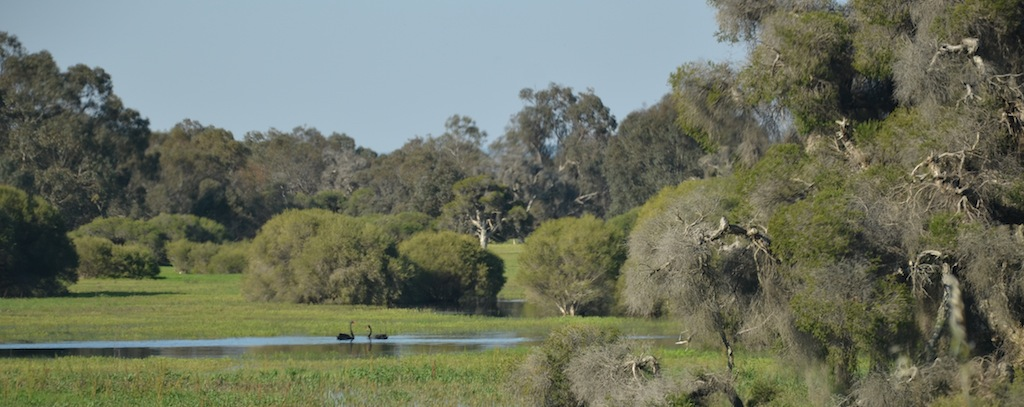
- Whiteman Park swans

- Location within Western Australia
- Whiteman Park (●) protects a drinking water source for Perth, Western Australia, although both Tonkin Highway and the Ellenbrook line now traverse it.
- Location: Western Australia
- Nearest city: Perth
- Coordinates: 31.821791°S 115.928442°E
- Area: 4,000 ha (9,900 acres)
- Etymology: Lew Whiteman
- Open: 8:30 am – 6 pm
- Public transit: Whiteman Park railway and bus station
- Main entrance: Drumpellier Drive
- Website: www.whitemanpark.com.au

Whiteman Park is a 4,000-hectare (9,900-acre) bushland area located 22 kilometres (14 mi) north of the central business district of Perth, Western Australia. The park is in the suburb of Whiteman, in the Swan Valley in the upper reaches of the Swan River.

It encompasses the source of Bennett Brook – an important place to the Nyoongar people, and a source of mythology of the Wagyl and stories about Aboriginal occupancy of the area.

Whiteman Park is known for its biodiversity, including more than 450 endemic plants and more than 120 vertebrate animals, some of which are rare and endangered. More than 17% of Western Australian bird species occur in Whiteman Park, including migratory birds attracted to the habitat provided by Bennett Brook and associated wetlands, including Grogan's Swamp, a Conservation Category Wetland.

== History ==
The Government of Western Australia purchased the land from a number of private owners in 1978 to protect the underlying aquifer as a drinking water source for Perth. The major owner was Lew Whiteman, after whom the park is named.

== Attractions ==
Whiteman Park includes bushwalking trails, bike paths, sports facilities and playgrounds.

The park is also host to heritage transport groups and their collections.

- Perth Electric Tramway Society
- Caversham Wildlife Park
- Bennett Brook Railway
- The Tractor Museum of Western Australia
- The Western Australian Motor Museum
- Bus Preservation Society of Western Australia
- Revolutions Transport Museum

== Transport ==
Whiteman Park is served by the Whiteman Park railway and bus station on the Ellenbrook line, situated near the main entrance of the park at Drumpellier Drive. The park's existing heritage tram line has also been extended to the station and has a dedicated platform south of the Transperth platforms. Whiteman Park station opened on 8 December 2024.
