= Dayton, Western Australia =

Coordinates: 31°51′06″S 115°58′32″E

Dayton Perth, Western Australia
- Population: 5,507 (SAL 2021)
- Established: 2011
- Postcode(s): 6055
- LGA(s): City of Swan
- State electorate(s): West Swan
- Federal division(s): Hasluck
Suburbs around Dayton:
Whiteman	Brabham	West Swan
Bennett Springs	Dayton	West Swan
Caversham	Caversham	Caversham

Dayton is a suburb of Perth, Western Australia, located in the City of Swan. It was gazetted in May 2011, and was named after Walter Warner Day, a pioneer of both the cattle and wine-growing industries in the City of Swan. The suburb is part of the City of Swan's Urban Growth Corridor and is bounded by Lord Street, Harrow Street, Malvern Street, Reid Highway and the Dampier to Bunbury Natural Gas Pipeline. The suburb is located in the Swan Valley Ward of the City of Swan.

== Schools ==
A new primary school in Dayton is opening in 2023 called Dayton Primary School
