= Ellenbrook line =

Railway line in Perth, Western Australia

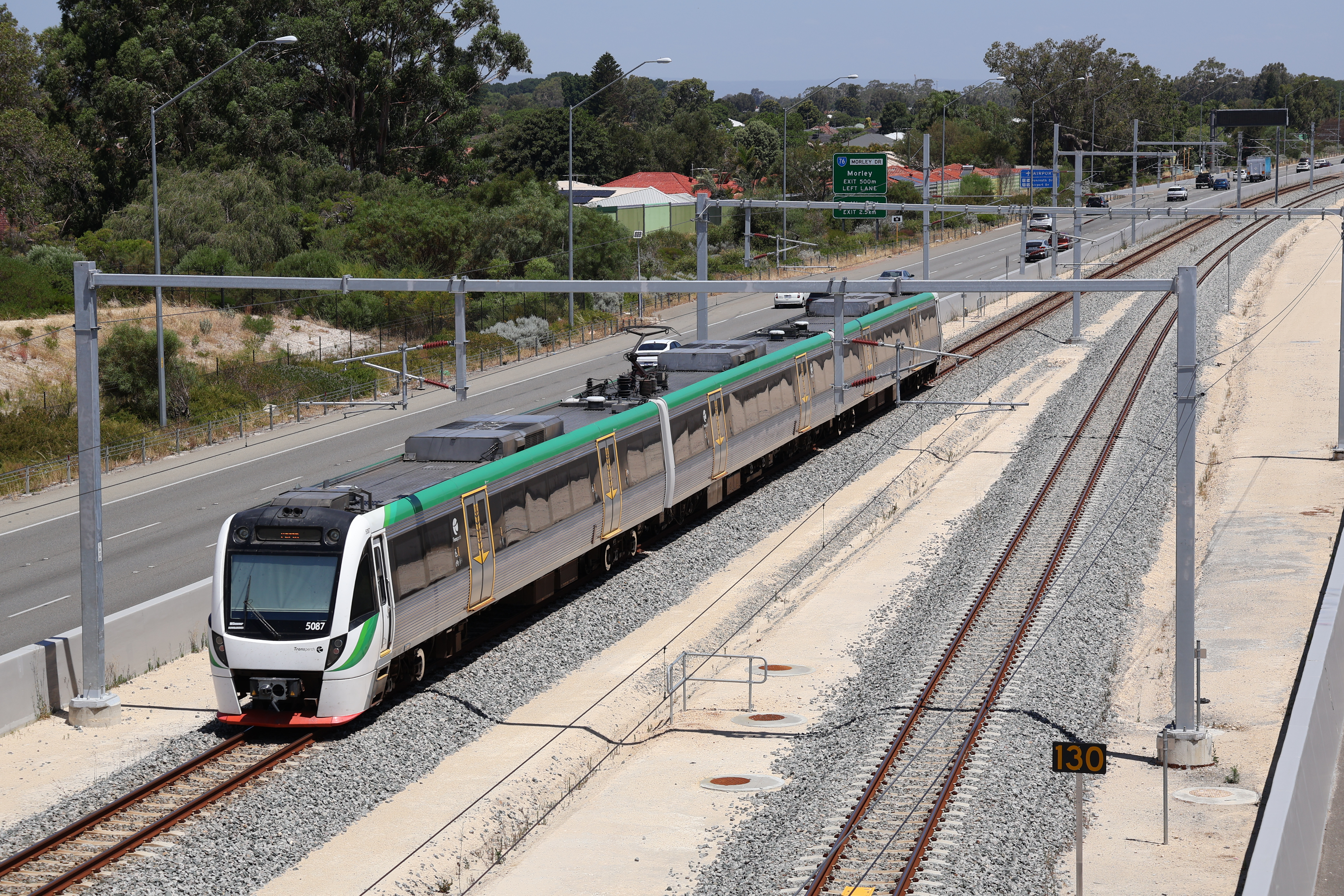
- Ellenbrook line within Tonkin Highway south of Benara Road, January 2026

Overview
- Other name: Morley–Ellenbrook line (during construction)
- Owner: Public Transport Authority
- Locale: Perth, Western Australia
- Termini: Ellenbrook (north-east); Perth (south-west)
- Stations: 5 (branch); 13 (total)

Service
- Type: Suburban rail
- System: Transperth
- Operator: Public Transport Authority
- Depot: Claisebrook railcar depot
- Rolling stock: Transperth B-series trains
- Ridership: 3,979,302 (year to June 2025)

History
- Work began: January 2022
- Opened: 8 December 2024

Technical
- Line length: 27.9 km (17.3 mi) (Note: This includes 2.1 kilometres (1.3 mi) from Perth to East Perth, 4.2 kilometres (2.6 mi) from East Perth to the junction in Bayswater, and 21.6 kilometres (13.4 mi) from the junction to Ellenbrook.)
- Num of tracks: 2
- Character: At-grade and elevated
- Track gauge: 1,067 mm (3 ft 6 in) narrow gauge
- Electrification: 25 kV 50 Hz AC from overhead catenary
- Operating speed: 130 km/h (81 mph)
- Signalling: Fixed block signalling
- Train protection system: Automatic train protection
Route map
- Red shading denotes the Free Transit Zone

The Ellenbrook line, known as the Morley–Ellenbrook line during construction, is a suburban railway line in Perth, Western Australia, which is operated by the Public Transport Authority as part of the Transperth system. The line branches from the Midland line at Bayswater station and heads north-north-west to serve five stations along a 21.3-kilometre (13.2 mi) route to Ellenbrook. Ellenbrook line services continue west of Bayswater station alongside Midland and Airport line services to terminate at Perth station in the central business district.

Land for a transit line to Ellenbrook was reserved in the 1990s during the initial development of Ellenbrook. A railway line to Ellenbrook was promised by both major political parties in the leadup to the 2008 state election, but was cancelled by the newly-elected Liberal government after the election. After the Labor Party won the 2017 state election, planning for the Ellenbrook line restarted as part of the wider Metronet project. Enabling works within the Tonkin Highway median strip were undertaken by the Tonkin Gap project, which started construction in November 2020 and was completed in early 2024. The main Ellenbrook line contract was awarded to Laing O'Rourke in October 2020 and construction began in January 2022. The main contract's budget was A$1.123 billion, which increased to $1.651 billion in 2023. Track laying was completed by July 2024 and all stations were complete by November, allowing the Ellenbrook line to open on 8 December 2024.

Branching from the Midland line at Bayswater station, the Ellenbrook line enters the median strip of Tonkin Highway, the location of Morley and Noranda stations. After exiting the highway, the line runs along the southern and eastern edges of Whiteman Park, the location of Ballajura and Whiteman Park stations, before entering Ellenbrook to terminate at Ellenbrook station. The Ellenbrook line has a frequency of five trains per hour during peak and four trains per hour off peak, operated by B-series trains. The travel time from Ellenbrook to Perth is 31 minutes. All stations along the branch are fully accessible and have 150-metre-long (490 ft) platforms; train lengths are limited by 100-metre (330 ft) platforms between Perth and Bayswater. The branch was forecast to have 11,753 boardings per weekday upon opening, increasing to 18,070 boardings per weekday in 2031, but as of July 2025, the branch has 5,364 boardings per weekday.

== History ==
=== Corridor reservation ===
The 1955 Plan for the Metropolitan Region, Perth and Fremantle, also known as the Stephenson–Hepburn Report, proposed a 7 1/2-mile (12 km) railway line branching off the Eastern Railway (Midland line) at Bayswater, then heading north through Morley to reach Walter Road, then north-west to terminate near Wanneroo Road. The branch was planned to have six stations and projected to have 7,000 daily passengers. The report also proposed the Beechboro–Gosnells Highway, now known as Tonkin Highway. When the Metropolitan Region Scheme was adopted in 1963, the land for the proposed highway was reserved but not the land for the proposed railway. Tonkin Highway between Railway Parade and Reid Highway was opened in stages between 1984 and 1991.

The North-East Corridor Structure Plan, published in 1994, called for the rezoning of Ellenbrook for urban development and the reservation of a public transport corridor from the proposed Ellenbrook town centre and along Lord Street (now known as Drumpellier Drive) to Bassendean on the Midland line. The Metropolitan Region Scheme was amended later that year to reserve the corridor from Ellenbrook to Reid Highway. The corridor south of Reid Highway to Bassendean was not reserved due to a large number of objections, which prompted the government to commission the North-East Corridor Transit Route Reserve Study to determine a route south of the Reid Highway/Lord Street junction. The study outlined four possible routes:

A map of the four options outlined in the North-East Corridor Transit Route Reserve Study

- To Bayswater via the Tonkin Highway median strip and the northern side of Reid Highway. The northern side of Reid Highway was selected as the highway's median strip was not wide enough for the railway and the southern side had housing that was too close to the highway. Potential station locations were Walter Road/Morley Drive, Benara Road, Beechboro Road, Altone Road, and Marshall Road.
- To Bassendean via the western side of Lord Street. This option would have required a 240-metre (790 ft) tunnel to exit the Midland line corridor and pass under several houses. Potential station locations were Morley Drive, Benara Road, and Marshall Road.
- To Midland via an extension of Benara Road through Caversham. This route had the Ellenbrook line end at Midland station, with a transfer required to get to Perth station. Potential station locations were West Swan Road and Marshall Road.
- To Middle Swan via the Reid Highway median strip and from Middle Swan to Midland via the freight railway. This would operate as an extension of the Midland line. Potential station locations were Great Eastern Highway, Morrison Road, Stratton, Great Northern Highway, West Swan Road, and Marshall Road.

The route to Bayswater was chosen as the preferred option, so in 1996, the land required for that was reserved in the Metropolitan Region Scheme.

=== Proposals ===
Following the success of the Mandurah line, which opened in late 2007, Premier of Western Australia Alan Carpenter committed a week before the September 2008 state election to build a railway line to Ellenbrook for A$850 million if the Labor Party were re-elected, with construction starting in 2012 and finishing in 2015. Opposition and Liberal Party leader Colin Barnett also committed to building a railway to Ellenbrook, but following the Liberal Party's election victory, the Public Transport Authority (PTA) advised Transport Minister Simon O'Brien that bus rapid transit (BRT) would be more adaptable and could follow roads through built-up areas, unlike a railway line. In April 2009, the PTA cancelled a route definition study that had been commissioned by the Carpenter government and commenced a feasibility study due to doubts over the line's viability. New Transport Minister Troy Buswell said in May 2011 that the Liberal Party only committed to the Ellenbrook line because it believed that the Carpenter government had done a feasibility study, and that a subsequent study found that patronage would not be high enough for a rail line. Barnett said that he had only committed to building it if elected to a second term.

In July 2011, the government's Public Transport in Perth in 2031 plan committed to a BRT service between Ellenbrook and Bassendean station, ending plans for a rail line to Ellenbrook. By August 2012, the design of the BRT route was underway. Ahead of the March 2013 state election, Barnett again promised to build a rail line to Ellenbrook if re-elected, which he reiterated during an election debate on the ABC. In February 2013, Barnett reneged on that promise, saying "when we looked at it and we took advice from the Department of Transport and others, it was clear that rail line was ahead of its time". Meanwhile, Labor leader Mark McGowan committed to building the Ellenbrook line as part of Labor's proposed Metronet project. Days before the election, Barnett announced that the BRT project had been cancelled due to costs increasing from $61 million to $110 million. The Liberals won the election.

In the May 2016 state budget, the Ellenbrook BRT project was revived with a cheaper route. Estimated to cost $49 million, the new route was a 9-kilometre (6 mi) dedicated busway along Lord Street between the Ellenbrook town centre and Marshall Road. There would have been bus stations in the Ellenbrook town centre, at Gnangara Road, and at Marshall Road, with a future station at Youle-Dean Road. The busway would have been grade separated at Gnangara Road, Park Street and Youle-Dean Road, and buses would have continued south of Marshall Road along regular streets to Bassendean and Midland stations. Sections of Lord Street would have been upgraded and realigned as well. A request for tenders was released in July 2016 and in November 2016, CPB Contractors was selected as the preferred proponent, with the cost having risen to $55 million.

In February 2016, Transport Minister Dean Nalder revealed the government was considering an underground rail line from the Perth central business district to Morley via Edith Cowan University in Mount Lawley, with an eventual extension to Ellenbrook. Labor criticised the tunnel for being too expensive. The Transport@3.5 million plan, published in July 2016, said a railway line to Ellenbrook would not be built until after 2050, with the tunnel from Perth to Morley to be built as the first stage of a line to East Wanneroo; the Ellenbrook line would later be built as a spur off that line. A week later, Barnett backtracked, saying that a rail line to Ellenbrook would be constructed "well before" 2050. The final version of the Transport@3.5 million report, published in February 2017, said that a rail line to Ellenbrook would be built before 2050. Labor again promised to build the Ellenbrook line for $863 million as part of its revised Metronet project, with construction beginning in 2019 and finishing in 2022.

Labor won the March 2017 state election. Afterwards, Premier Mark McGowan announced the cancellation of the Ellenbrook BRT project as it was redundant to the Ellenbrook line. The contract with CPB was renegotiated into a realignment and upgrade of Lord Street. Upon the project's completion in April 2019, Lord Street was renamed Drumpellier Drive. As part of the NorthLink WA project, the intersections between Tonkin Highway and Collier Road, Morley Drive, Benara Road, and Reid Highway were grade separated and the highway was extended north, providing the corridor for the Ellenbrook line to be built.

=== Planning ===
Prime Minister Malcolm Turnbull committed $500 million in the April 2018 federal budget for the Ellenbrook line, then-known as the Morley–Ellenbrook line, subject to a favourable assessment by the independent statutory authority Infrastructure Australia.

The finalised route for the Ellenbrook line was revealed in August 2019, with the state government saying that it considered 100 possible routes. The main engineering challenges of the final alignment were the tunnels to enter and exit Tonkin Highway. The number and location of stations were finalised. There were to be five stations: Morley, Noranda, Ballajura (known at the time as Malaga station), Whiteman Park, and Ellenbrook. It was announced that the scope of an existing project to rebuild Bayswater station would be increased to add extra platforms for the Ellenbrook line. The expected year of opening was 2022–23.

Consideration was given to having the Ellenbrook line travel along Tonkin Highway on the western side of Whiteman Park, but this route would not have allowed for a station at the entrance to Whiteman Park or a station to serve Henley Brook, Dayton, Brabham or West Swan. The design allows for a branch to extend north along Tonkin Highway past Ballajura. Consideration was also given to running the line along Reid Highway, as was planned in the 1990s, instead of the southern side of Whiteman Park, but the Reid and Tonkin Highway interchange constructed as part of NorthLink WA made that route difficult to construct. Another option considered was tunnelling the Ellenbrook line between Bayswater station and Tonkin Highway instead of building a viaduct. Tunnelling was rejected due to the high cost, steep slopes required, the Bayswater Main Drain being in the way, and disruption to the Airport and Midland lines. During further design, the height of the viaduct was reduced due to complaints from nearby residents. The route through the southern and eastern parts of Whiteman was criticised by the shadow minister for transport, Libby Mettam, who said that it broke the terms of an agreement made when Lew Whiteman and other landowners sold the land to the state government, which said that the land must remain public open space. The state government retorted by saying that the previous Liberal government had planned for the land to become a cemetery and a sporting complex.

The environmental assessment was divided into two packages. The Bayswater to Malaga environmental assessment application was submitted to the state's Environmental Protection Authority (EPA) in November 2019, which determined the following month that this portion did not require assessment by the EPA. The Malaga to Ellenbrook environmental assessment application was submitted to the EPA in December 2019, which approved the application in November 2020. Important environmental considerations included the clearing of vegetation, impacts on Bennett Brook and nearby wetlands, and the habitat of Carter's freshwater mussels and black cockatoos.

In February 2020, the Parliament of Western Australia passed the Railway (METRONET) Amendment Act 2020, an enabling act for the Ellenbrook line, authorising the line's construction. Infrastructure Australia released its assessment of the Ellenbrook line in May 2020, adding the project to the Infrastructure Priority List as a "Priority Project", enabling it to receive $500 million in federal funding. Infrastructure Australia described the project as a "marginal" case, saying that urban renewal would be crucial to the project achieving the desired patronage levels and that the government had overestimated projected patronage growth and travel times, but that the Ellenbrook corridor had high population growth and was one of Perth's only corridors without a railway line. In June 2020, the project definition plan was released, which said that the Ellenbrook line would be divided into four programs of work: the Bayswater station project, the Tonkin Gap project, the main Ellenbrook line works, and forward works.

=== Tonkin Gap project ===
The Tonkin Gap project's main purpose was to widen Tonkin Highway between Collier Road in Bayswater and Dunreath Drive in Redcliffe; enabling works for the Ellenbrook line to run in the highway's median strip were incorporated into this project as well. Managed by Main Roads Western Australia, the enabling works included building the tunnels and dive structures for the railway to enter and exit the highway at Bayswater and Ballajura, modifying drainage along the Ellenbrook line route, adding barriers between Tonkin Highway and the railway, rebuilding the Broun Avenue bridge to allow for a bus interchange at Morley station, and building railway bridges across Morley Drive. As a future railway line was not considered during the construction of NorthLink WA stage one, the associated works also included adding deflection walls to bridge piers and electrification screens to bridges. The Tonkin Gap Alliance, consisting of BMD, Georgiou, WA Limestone, BG&E and GHD, was announced as the preferred proponent in May 2020, and the $400 million contract was signed in June 2020. Construction began in November 2020. The cost has since increased to $761 million.

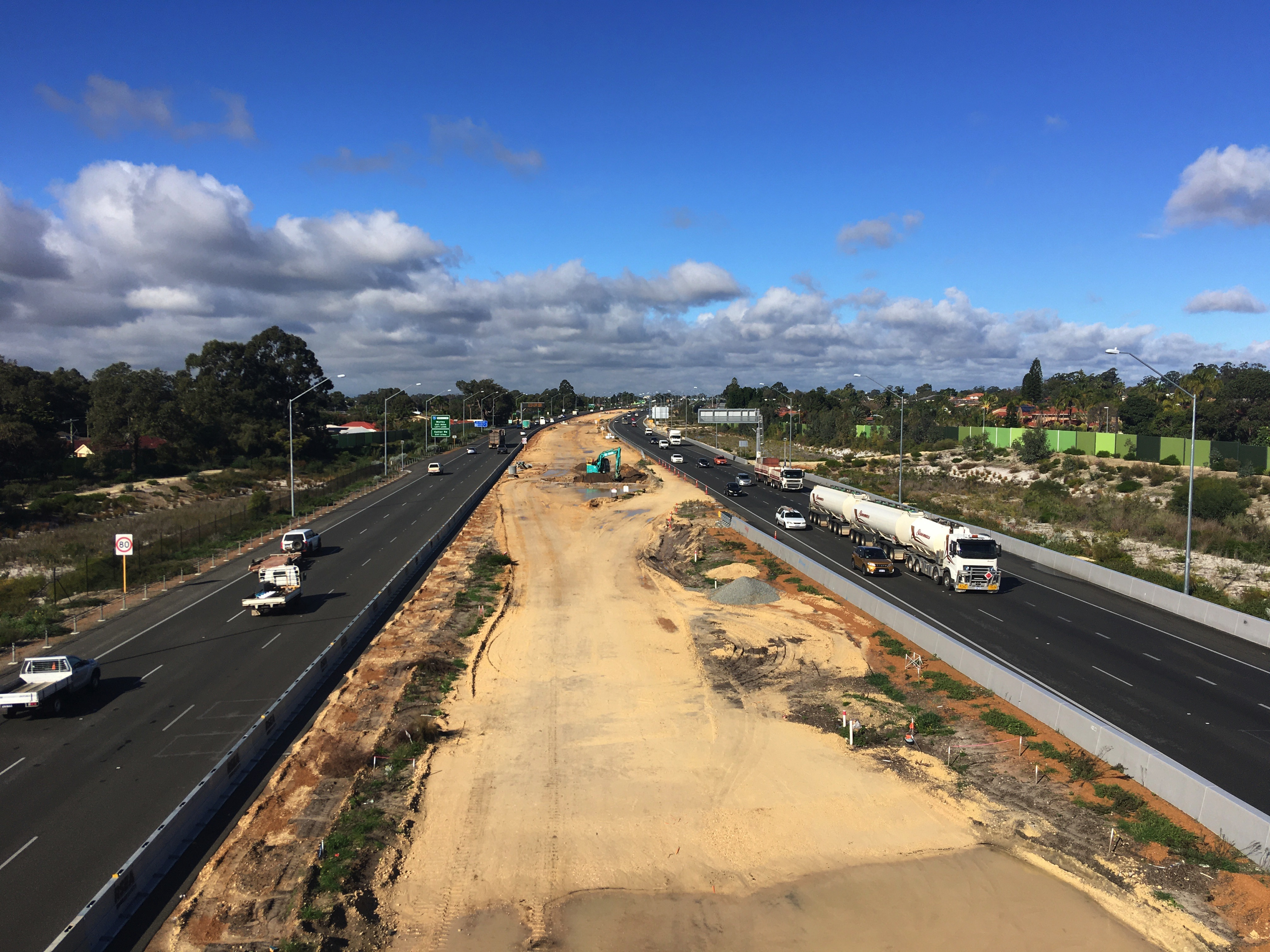
Earthworks for the Tonkin Gap south of Benara Road, July 2021

The two dive structures were built by shifting the affected Tonkin Highway carriageway out of the way. From May 2021, the northbound Tonkin Highway carriageway between Railway Parade and Collier Road was shifted east to allow for the construction of the southern dive structure. In December 2022, both carriageways were diverted to the western side of the dive structure, and in early 2023, the southbound carriageway was moved back to its original location. From September 2021, the southbound Tonkin Highway carriageway near Marshall Road was shifted west to allow for the construction of the northern dive structure. Piling works started that month and were completed in April 2022, after which, excavation and concrete pours commenced. In March 2023, the northern dive structure was completed and the southbound Tonkin Highway carriageway was moved back to its original location.

The Broun Avenue bridge was replaced because its clearance was not high enough and the Morley station bus interchange was to be built on a bridge across Tonkin Highway. The old bridge was demolished in April 2022 and the new bridge was structurally complete by September 2022. In November 2022, it was announced that a footbridge across Tonkin Highway to Ballajura station would be added to the scope of the Tonkin Gap project, in response to a community survey undertaken by Metronet in 2021. The Tonkin Gap project was officially completed in July 2024.

=== Bayswater station project ===
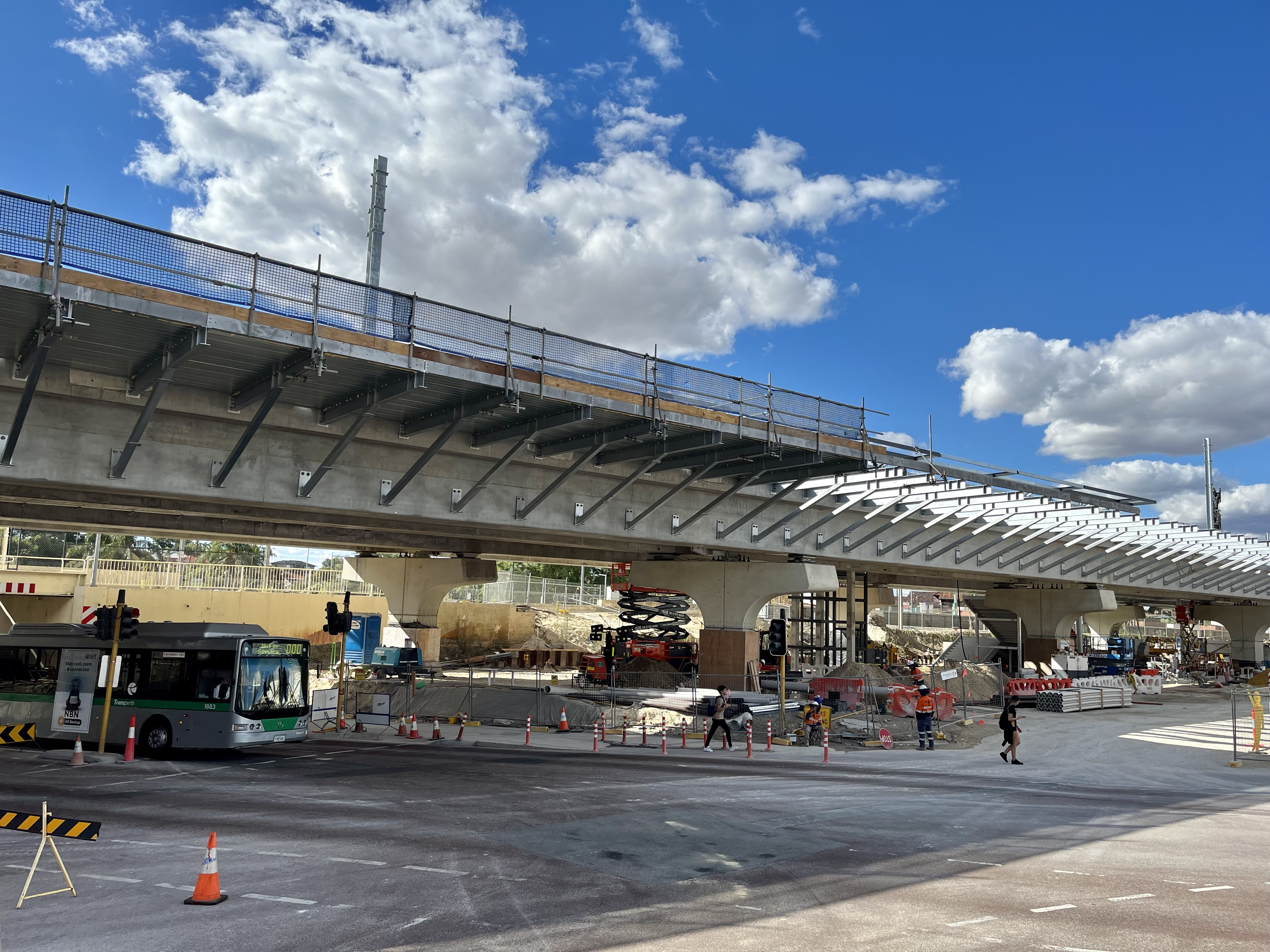
Bayswater station under construction, March 2023

Before the Ellenbrook line, Bayswater station was already planned to be rebuilt for the Forrestfield–Airport Link (Airport line), which was under construction at the time. The station was to be rebuilt as an elevated station with two platform faces and a turnback siding west of the station. The planned number of platform faces was increased to four upon the announcement of the Ellenbrook line's route. On 9 April 2020, the contract for the Bayswater station project, worth $253 million, was awarded to the Evolve Bayswater Alliance, consisting of Coleman Rail and Decmil. Construction began in January 2021.

The budget for the Bayswater station project increased twice, in 2023 and 2024, making the final cost $516 million. The southern half of the new station opened on 8 October 2023. From 28 March to 8 April 2024, the Airport and Midland lines were shut down to realign the tracks through Bayswater station to their final alignment and to construct the connection to the Ellenbrook line. The northern half of the station opened at the end of that shutdown.

=== Ellenbrook line construction ===
A request for proposal for the Ellenbrook line's design and construct contract was released in January 2020, and in April 2020, two alliances were shortlisted: the Ellenbrook Alliance, consisting of CPB Contractors and Downer EDI, and the MELconnx Consortium, consisting of UK company Laing O'Rourke. The MELconnx Consortium was chosen as the preferred proponent in September 2020. The following month, the contract with the MELconnx Consortium was signed for $700 million, with the completion date delayed to 2023–24. The contract's total budget was $1.123 billion when including contingency, escalation, and ancillary costs, with a further $233 million for the Ellenbrook line portion of the Bayswater station and Tonkin Gap projects. The shadow minister for transport, Libby Mettam, criticised the decision to go with a foreign contractor over a local contractor, and the CEO of the Civil Contractors Federation Western Australia said that the project could have been split into smaller contracts like what was done for the Mandurah line to allow for mid-tier contractors. The MELconnx Consortium chose Woods Bagot as the main architect for the five stations, alongside Taylor Robinson Chaney Broderick helping with Morley and Noranda stations, and UDLA and TCL doing the landscape architecture. The Morley–Ellenbrook line project won four awards at the 2025 Australian Institute of Architects's Western Australian Architecture Awards, including the state's highest architecture honour: the George Temple Poole Award.

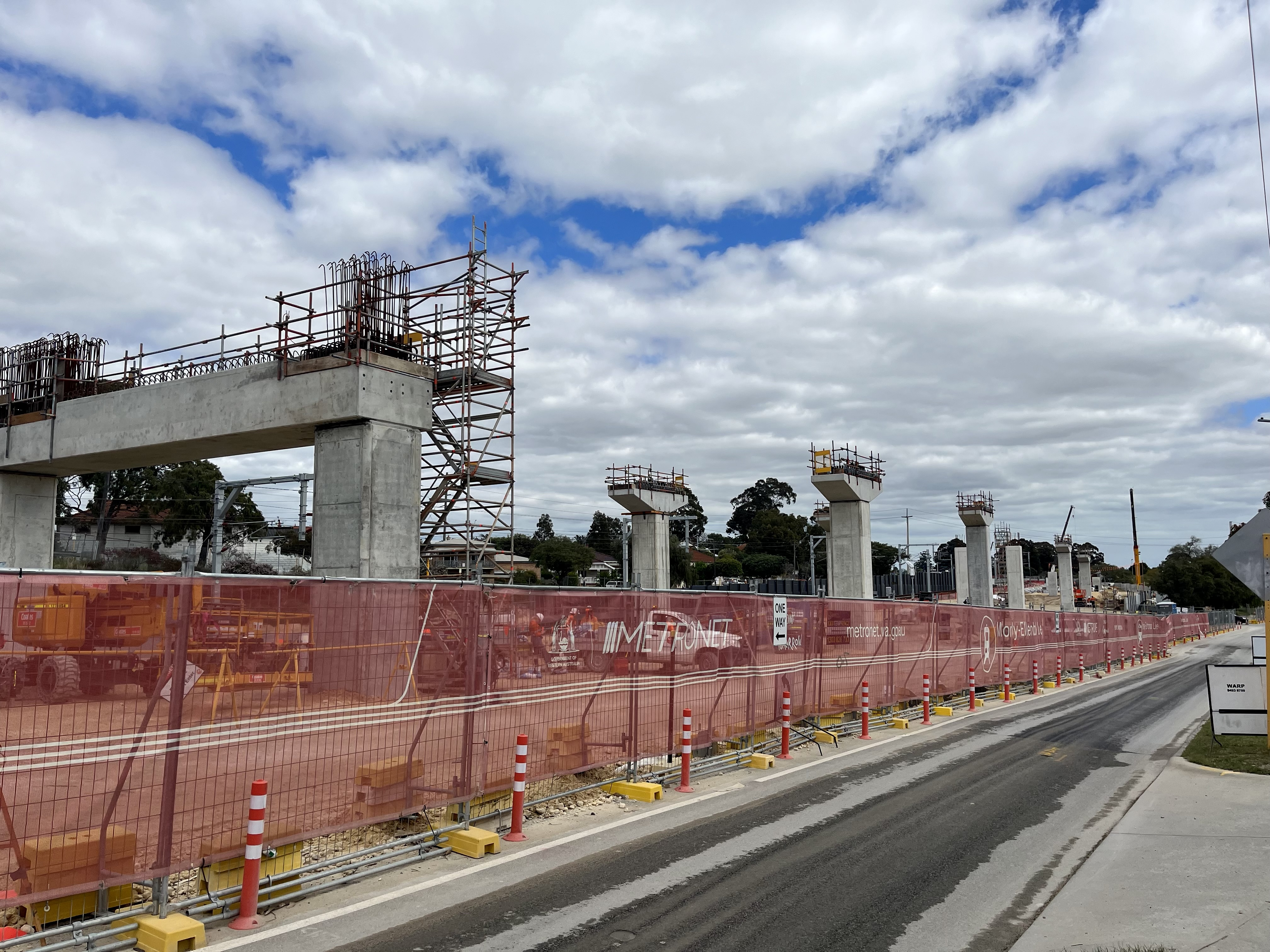
Bayswater viaduct under construction, September 2023

Construction began on each station starting from the northernmost station and heading south from there due to the ongoing construction work on the Tonkin Gap. Work started at Ellenbrook station in January 2022. Because the Ellenbrook line passes through the grounds of Ellenbrook Christian College, the state government funded a $2.8 million pavilion for the school's sports oval, and built an underpass. By March 2023, the first 1.5 kilometres (0.9 mi) of track had been laid between Whiteman Park station and Gnangara Road. The May 2023 state budget revealed the project's budget had increased by $528.1 million, bringing the total to $1.651 billion. The cost increase was blamed on issues with the supply of labour, equipment, and materials. By June 2023, the installation of beams for the Whiteman Park station viaduct had begun.

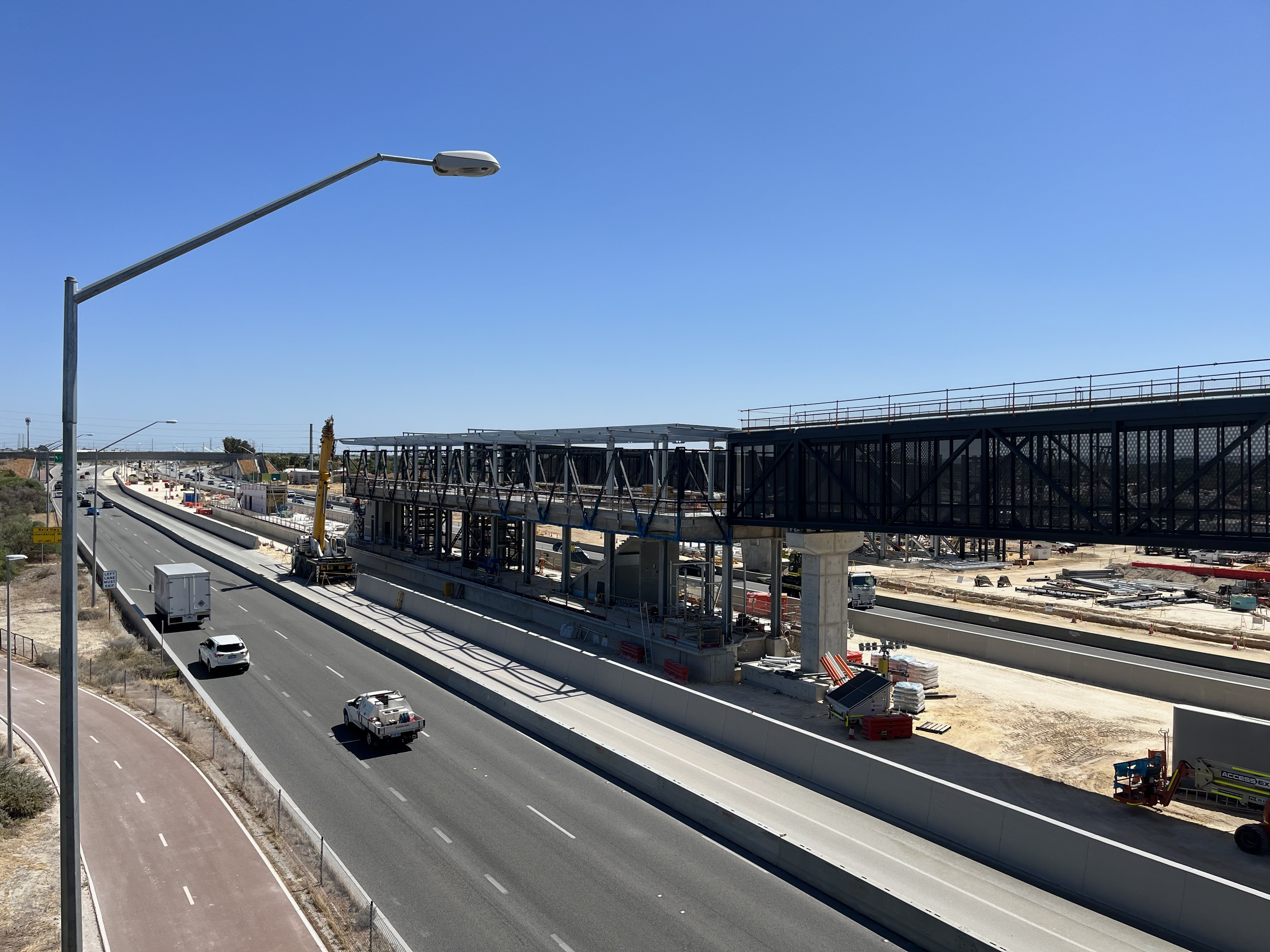
Noranda station under construction, January 2024

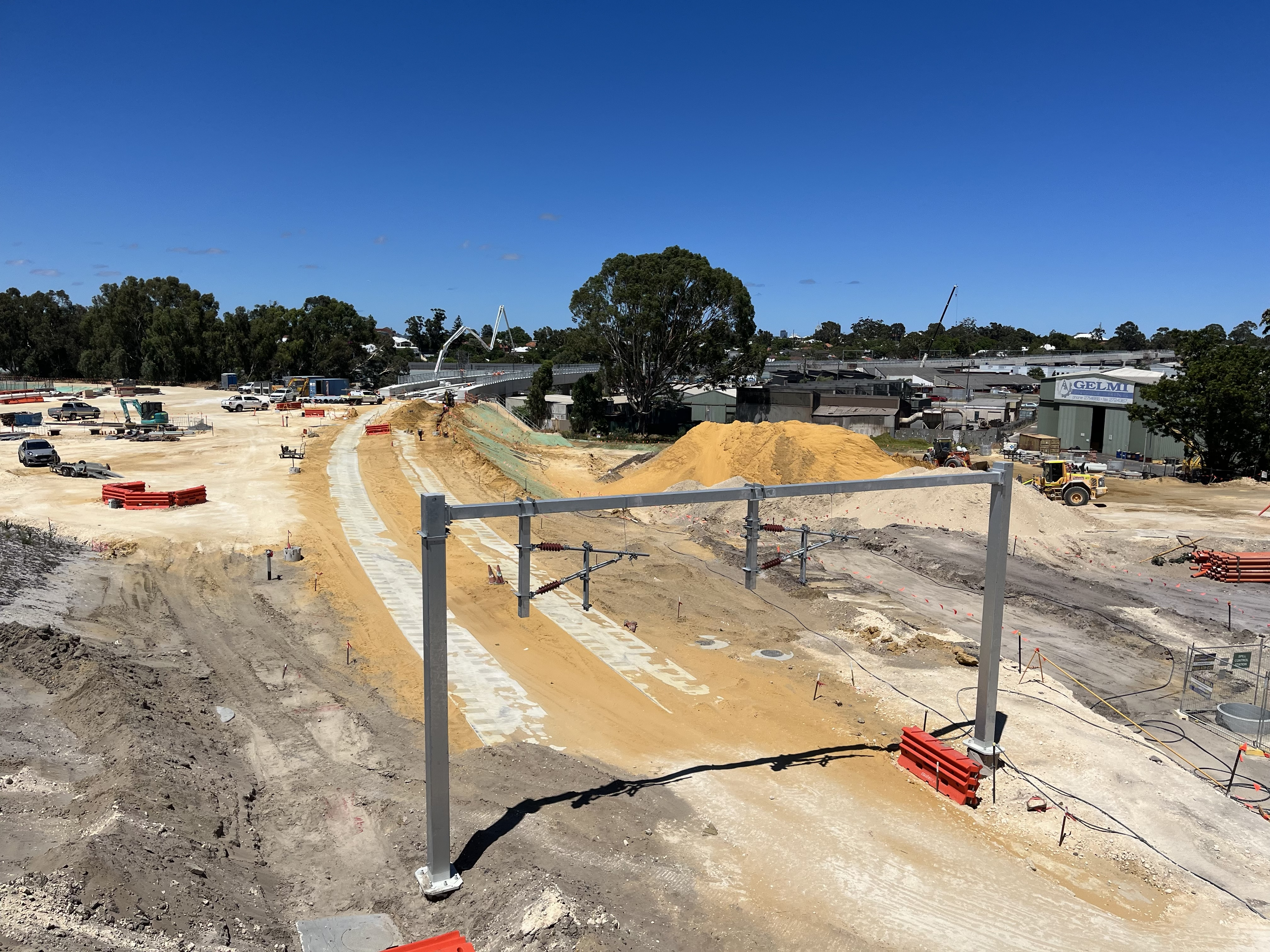
The Ellenbrook line as it exits the southern Tonkin Highway tunnel, pictured before tracks were laid here, January 2024

The five stations were completed during 2024, starting with Ellenbrook station in March. In July, Ballajura station was completed, and in August, Whiteman Park station was completed. The final two stations: Morley and Noranda, were completed by November. By March 2024, sixty-eight per cent of track laying had been completed and all major beams were installed for the Bayswater viaduct. Track laying was complete by the end of July 2024, the overhead lines were energised in August 2024 and the first train entered the line on 26 August 2024. Four weeks of testing was planned, with driver training commencing after that.

The Ellenbrook line was officially opened on 8 December 2024 by Prime Minister Anthony Albanese, Premier Roger Cook and state Transport Minister Rita Saffioti. Community events were held at each of the five new stations. It was estimated that over 40,000 people rode the Ellenbrook line on its first day. The line only ran between Ellenbrook and Bayswater on opening day; train services to Perth and feeder bus routes to the five new stations commenced the following day, albeit with some community concerns about buses feeding into the new line instead of Midland station.

=== After opening ===
Since opening, the turnback siding at Daglish station has been used to reverse Ellenbrook line trains, which has resulted in noise complaints from Daglish and Subiaco residents. The siding was previously seldom used. The City of Subiaco claimed that testing showed noise at the siding reached 92 decibels, causing the PTA to also undertake noise testing, which resulted in the siding being deemed compliant with regulations. Nonetheless, a flange lubrication system was installed, with mixed success in reducing noise. Since the opening of the Ellenbrook line, delays on the Transperth rail network have increased in frequency due to the congested track between Perth and Bayswater.

== Description ==
The Ellenbrook branch uses 1,067 mm (3 ft 6 in) narrow gauge track and has a maximum speed of 130 kilometres per hour (81 mph). Trains are powered by 25 kV 50 Hz AC overhead line equipment which is powered by a substation in Malaga. The Transperth network uses fixed block signalling. The tracks between Bayswater and Daglish are limited to fifteen trains per hour, which allows for a maximum frequency of five trains per hour on the Ellenbrook branch. As part of the High Capacity Signalling Project, Alstom and DT Infrastructure will replace the signalling system with Alstom's Urbalis communications-based train control (CBTC) system. The Ellenbrook, Airport, and Midland lines are to be Perth's first lines with the upgraded signalling system. As of 2026, this is planned to be operational in 2029.

=== Route ===
The Ellenbrook line branches from the Midland line at Bayswater and runs for 21.3 kilometres (13.2 mi) to Ellenbrook. South-west of Bayswater station, Ellenbrook line services run along the Midland line to Perth station, where they terminate and run empty to the siding west of Daglish station to turn around and travel back to Ellenbrook.

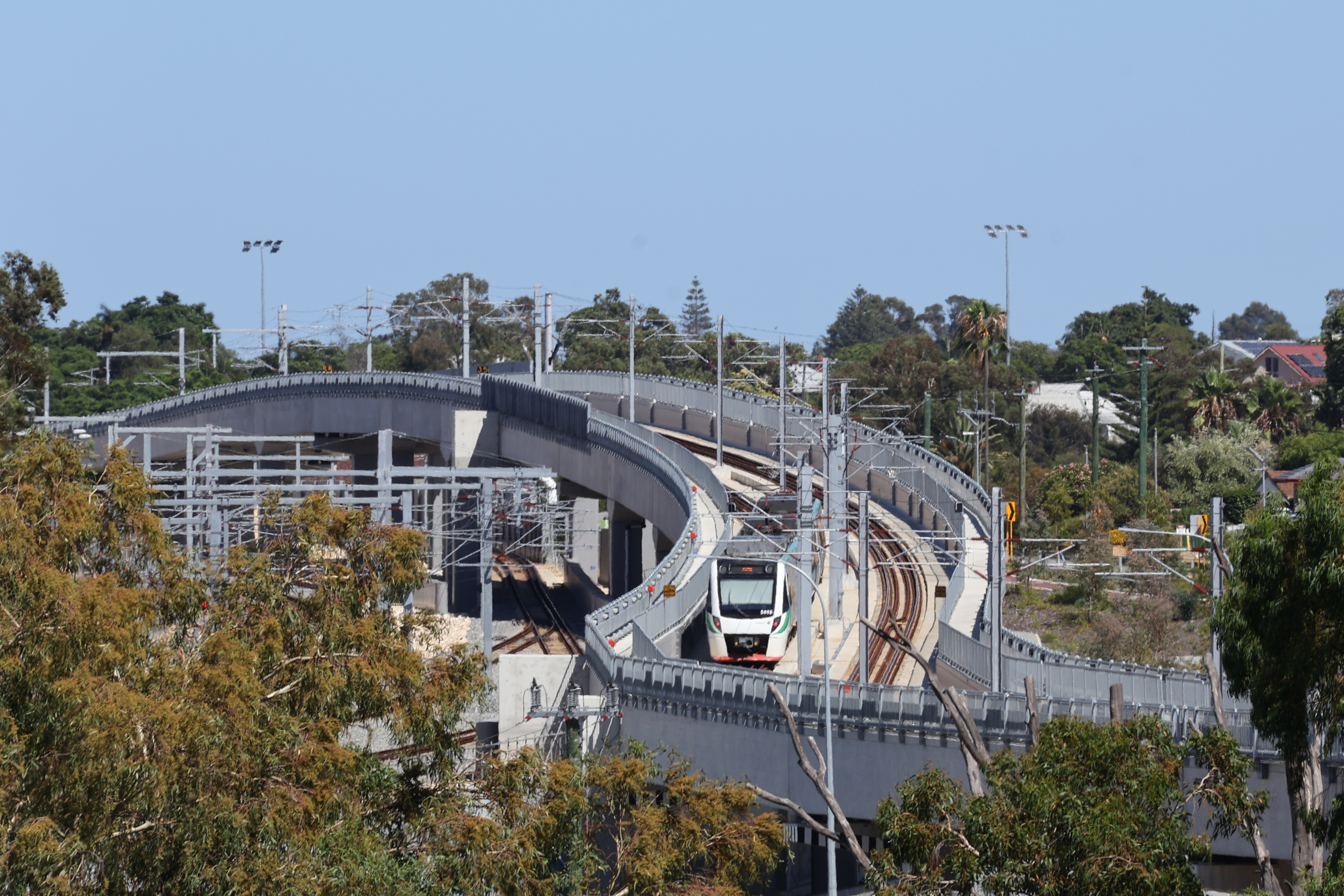
Viaduct in Bayswater

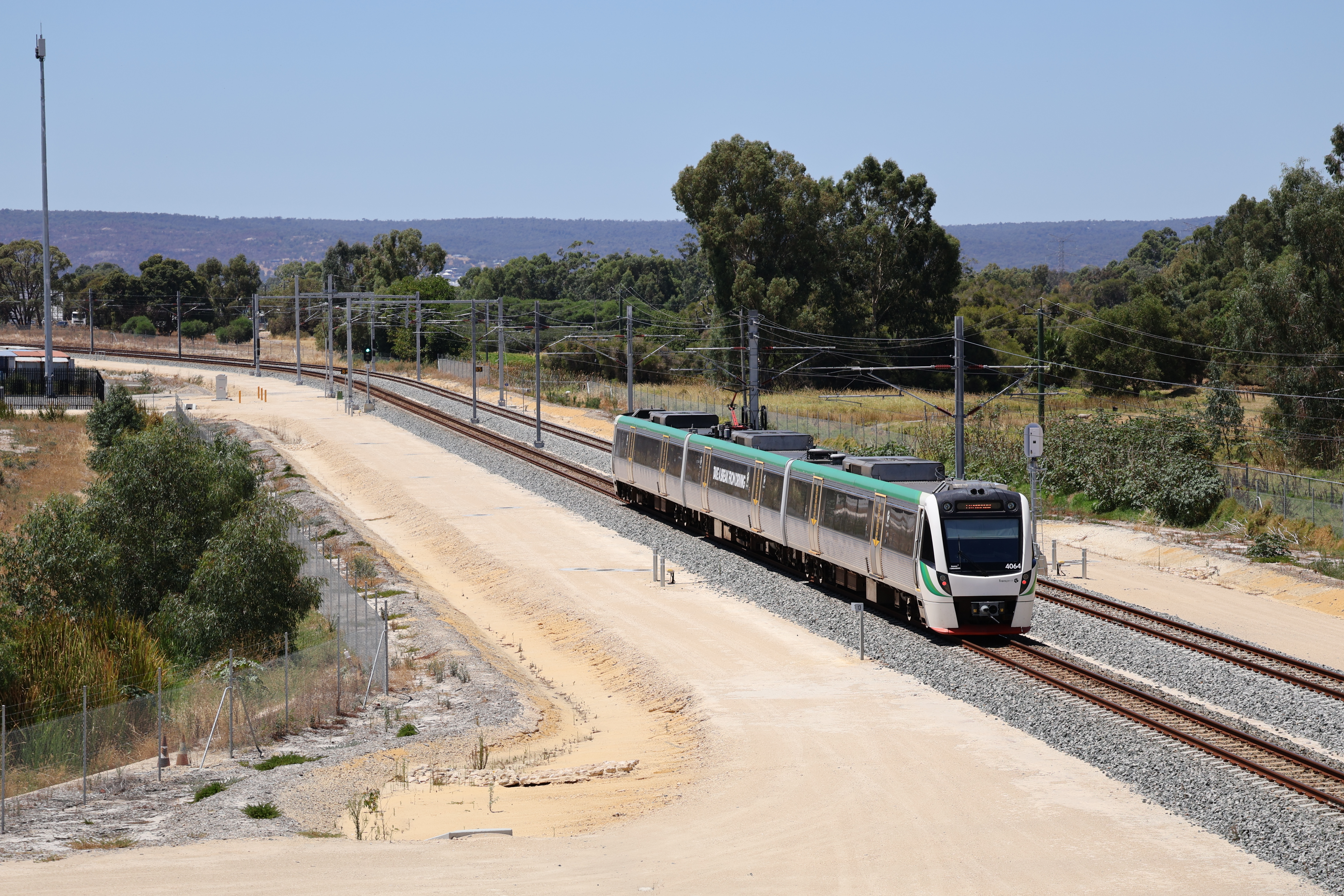
The site of the potential Bennett Springs East station viewed from the Dulwich Street Bridge, February 2026

The Ellenbrook line splits from the Midland line just west of Bayswater station; the Ellenbrook line uses the two inner tracks at Bayswater station and the Airport and Midland line services use the two outer tracks, allowing Ellenbrook line services to either terminate at Bayswater or continue to Perth station. East of Bayswater station, the Ellenbrook line enters an 850-metre-long (2,790 ft) viaduct, passing over the eastbound Midland line track and running parallel to the Midland line before curving north to pass over local roads. At Tonkin Highway, the line enters a tunnel and surfaces within the highway's median strip. The Ellenbrook line runs along Tonkin Highway for about 7 kilometres (4 mi) until it reaches Ballajura. There are two stations along this section: Morley station at Broun Avenue and Noranda station at Benara Road.

North of Marshall Road, the Ellenbrook line enters a short tunnel and bends east under the southbound Tonkin Highway carriageway to reach Ballajura station at ground level. East of Ballajura station, the Ellenbrook line passes under Beechboro Road North and then travels through land within the southern area of Whiteman Park, north of Marshall Road. The line bridges over Bennett Brook and enters a rural part of Bennett Springs, passing under Dulwich Street, where land is reserved for a potential Bennett Springs East station. The line then bends north to travel along the western side of Drumpellier Drive, avoiding Horse Swamp, which is classed as a conservation category wetland. At Whiteman Drive East, one of the main entrances to Whiteman Park, is Whiteman Park station, which is located on a viaduct that bridges over Whiteman Drive East. North of the station, the Ellenbrook line continues parallel to Drumpellier Drive and then enters a tunnel to pass under the intersection of Gnangara Road and Drumpellier Drive. The railway then diverges from Drumpellier Drive to enter Ellenbrook, passing through the Ellenbrook Christian College school grounds on an embankment to reach the Ellenbrook town centre, where the line terminates at Ellenbrook station.

=== Stations ===
Ellenbrook line services stop at 13 stations: eight from Perth to Bayswater and five on the Ellenbrook line branch. All stations on the Ellenbrook line branch are fully accessible and have 150-metre-long (490 ft) island platforms, long enough for a six-car train. Most stations between Perth and Bayswater only have platforms long enough for four-car trains, limiting the length of trains that can run on the Ellenbrook line. The exceptions are Bayswater, East Perth and Perth stations. The Claisebrook, Maylands and Meltham station platforms are planned to be lengthened, with Mount Lawley and McIver platforms to be extended thereafter. Several stations between Perth and Bayswater are not fully accessible. Factors limiting accessibility include non-compliant ramps, a lack of tactile paving, large platform gaps, and pedestrian level crossings.

List of stations
| Station | Image | Distance from Perth | | Location | Opened | Connections |
| Station | Image | km | mi | Location | Opened | Connections |
|---|---|---|---|---|---|---|
| Perth | Perth station platforms | 0.0 | 0.0 | Perth CBD | 1 March 1881 | Bus at Perth Busport, Australind, Airport, Armadale, Fremantle, Mandurah, Midland, Thornlie–Cockburn, and Yanchep lines |
| McIver | McIver station platform | 0.7 | 0.4 | Perth CBD | 14 August 1989 | Airport, Armadale, Midland and Thornlie–Cockburn lines |
| Claisebrook | Claisebrook station platform | 1.3 | 0.8 | East Perth, Perth | 1883 | Airport, Armadale, Midland and Thornlie–Cockburn lines |
| East Perth | East Perth station platform | 2.1 | 1.3 | East Perth, Perth | 15 June 1969 | Airport and Midland lines, Transwa coaches, AvonLink, MerredinLink, Prospector, and Indian Pacific |
| Mount Lawley | Mount Lawley station platform | 3.2 | 2.0 | Mount Lawley | 10 April 1907 | Airport and Midland lines |
| Maylands | Maylands station platform | 4.5 | 2.8 | Maylands | 1 February 1900 | Airport and Midland lines |
| Meltham | Meltham station platform | 5.5 | 3.4 | Bayswater | 14 June 1948 | Airport and Midland lines |
| Bayswater | Elevated station passing over a street | 6.7 | 4.1 | Bayswater | 28 September 1896 | Bus, Airport and Midland lines |
| Morley | Morley station platform in a highway median strip | 10.3 | 6.4 | Embleton, Morley | 8 December 2024 | Bus |
| Noranda | Noranda station platform in a highway median strip | 12.8 | 8.0 | Morley, Noranda | 8 December 2024 | Bus |
| Ballajura | Ballajura station platform | 15.9 | 9.9 | Whiteman | 8 December 2024 | Bus |
| Whiteman Park | Elevated train station | 21.6 | 13.4 | Whiteman | 8 December 2024 | Bus |
| Ellenbrook | Ellenbrook station entrance | 27.9 | 17.3 | Ellenbrook | 8 December 2024 | Bus |

== Services ==
Transperth train services are operated by the Public Transport Authority. Ellenbrook line frequencies are five trains per hour during peak, four trains per hour off peak and on weekends and public holidays, and two or one trains per hour late at night. It takes 31 minutes to travel from Perth to Ellenbrook. Services operate between roughly 5 am and midnight on weekdays, extending to 2 am on weekend nights. On weekend mornings, services commence at roughly 6 am and 7 am respectively. By 2031, it is planned for peak frequencies to increase to six trains per hour, which will require the CBTC system to be operational and an additional siding at Daglish.

=== Rolling stock ===
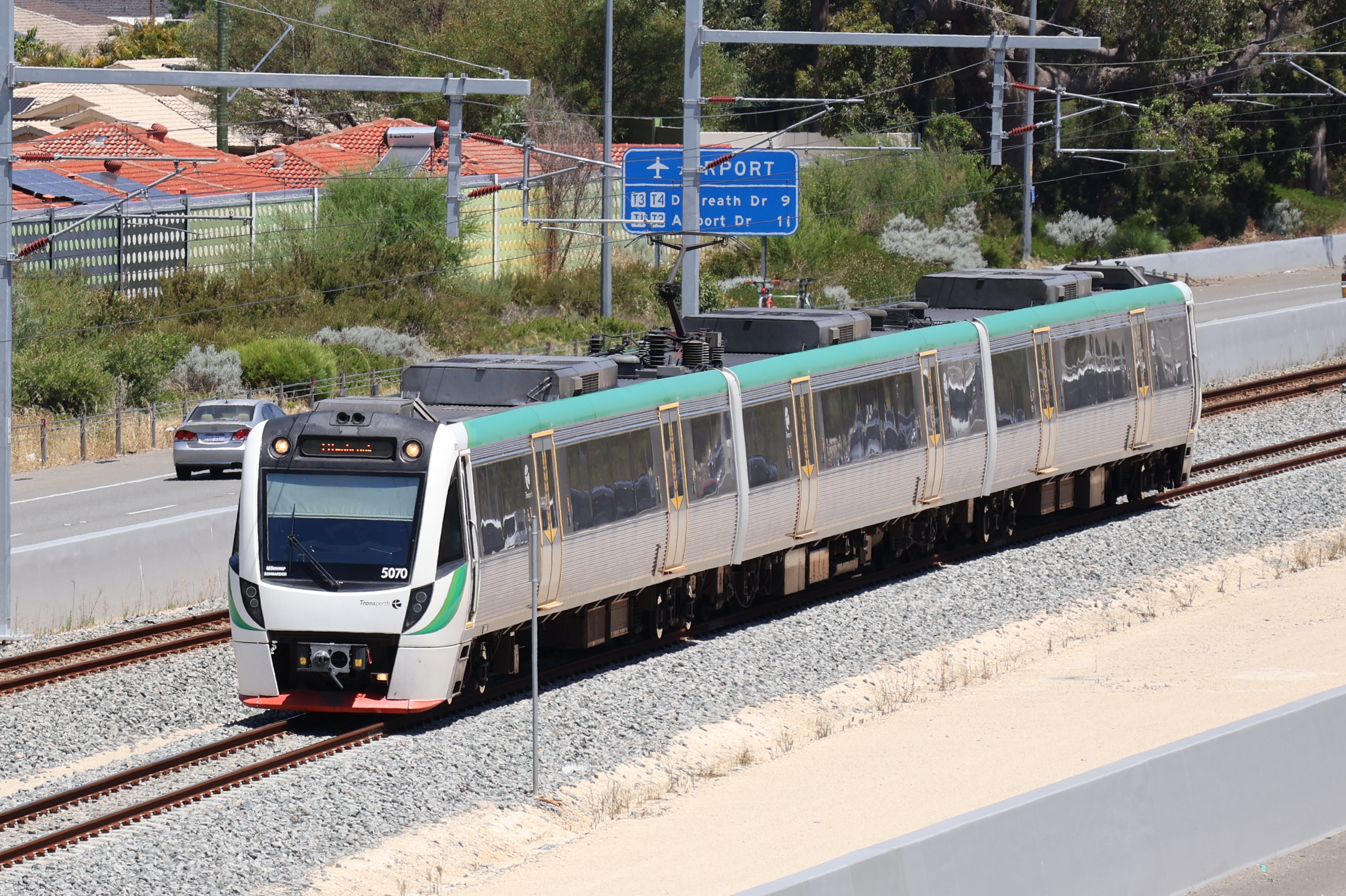
A B-series train on the Ellenbrook line south of Noranda station

Nine three-car Transperth B-series trains were planned to run Ellenbrook line services upon the line's opening. These trains entered service between 2004 and 2019, originally for the Mandurah and Yanchep lines, and consist of three cars each with two doors on the side of each car. The introduction of C-series trains to the Mandurah and Yanchep lines in 2024 allowed for some B-series trains to be freed up for use on the Ellenbrook line. Trains were planned to be stabled and maintained at Claisebrook railcar depot near the Perth central business district and the future Bellevue railcar depot at the end of the Midland line. Provisions have been made for a future depot along the Ellenbrook line in Henley Brook with capacity for twelve six-car trains.

=== Patronage ===
The Ellenbrook line branch was forecast to have 11,753 boardings per weekday upon opening, increasing to 18,070 boardings in 2031. The busiest station was forecast to be Ellenbrook station, with 8,016 boardings by 2031, followed by Whiteman Park station with 3,795 boardings, Ballajura station with 3,084 boardings, Noranda station with 1,810 boardings, and Morley station with 1,365 boardings. On the first weekday of service, the Ellenbrook line branch had almost 4,500 passengers, and as of July 2025, the branch is receiving 5,364 boardings per weekday. In the year to June 2025, the line as a whole had 1,961,838 boardings, and 3,979,302 boardings in the year to June 2026.
