= Bennett Brook (Australia) =

Stream in Perth, Western Australia

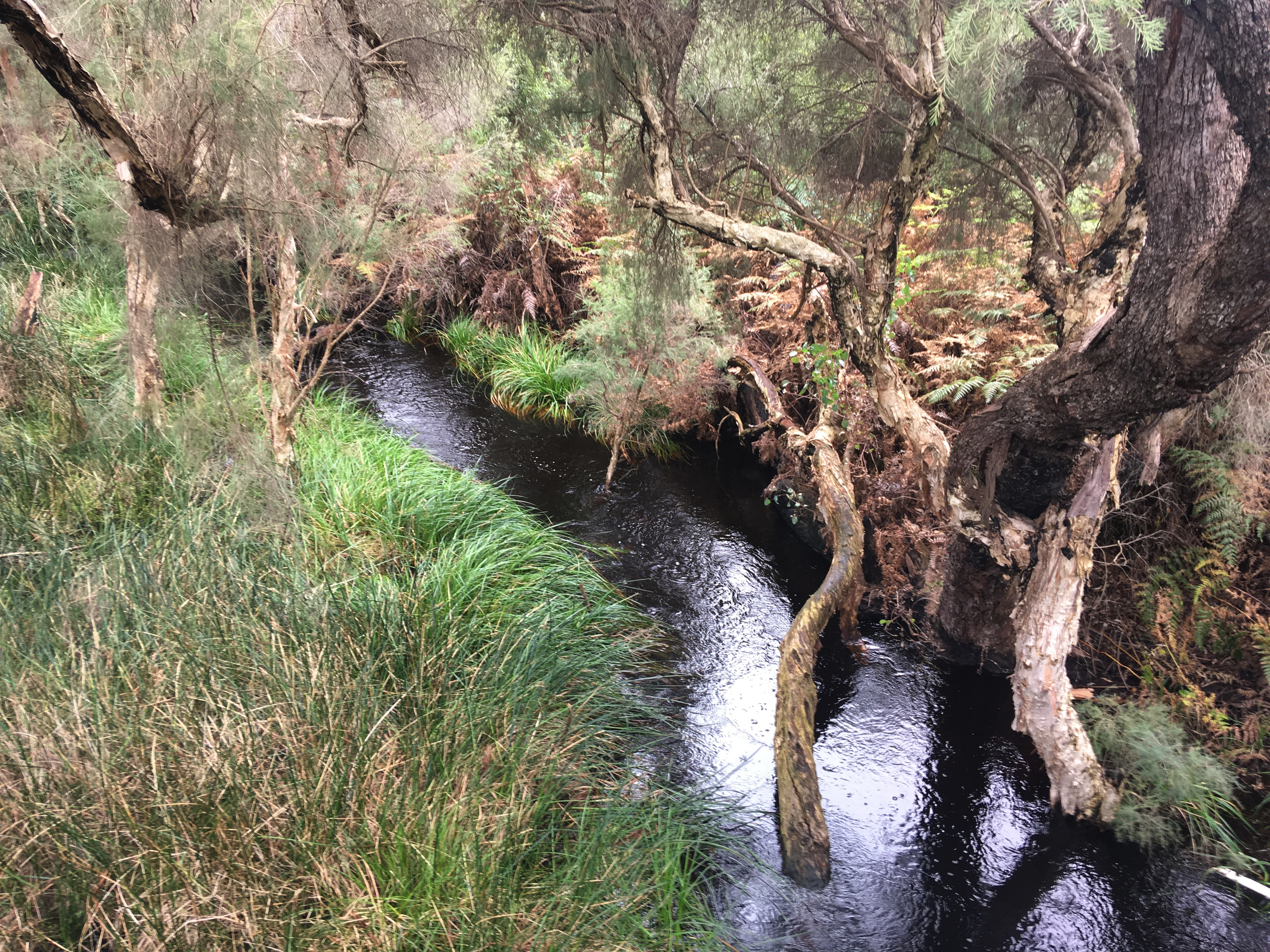
- Bennett Brook viewed from a footbridge in Caversham in August 2021
- Etymology: Matilda Leay Bennett, wife of John Septimus Roe

Location
- Country: Australia
- State: Western Australia

Physical characteristics
- Source: Gnangara Mound, Stormwater from surrounding urban area
  - location: Whiteman Park
  - coordinates: 31.818°S 115.919°E
- Mouth: Swan River
  - location: Border of Eden Hill and Caversham
  - coordinates: 31.894°S 115.960°E
- Length: 13 km (8.1 mi)
- Basin size: 217 km^{2} (84 sq mi)
- Discharge
  - average: 5.1 GL (180×10^{6} cu ft)

Bennett Brook is a stream that runs from Whiteman Park to the Swan River in Western Australia.

== Overview ==
Bennett Brook's catchment area covers 217 square kilometres (84 sq mi). Approximately half of the catchment area is covered by Whiteman Park and the Gnangara Pine Plantation. The rest of the catchment is urbanised, covering the suburbs of Ballajura, Beechboro, Bennett Springs, Kiara, Lockridge, Malaga, Morley and Noranda. The tributaries to the west are highly modified and partially underground. The tributaries to the north are mostly natural.

Upstream areas only flow between August and November. Groundwater pumping from the Gnangara Mound has made the flow lower than the natural flow. Downstream areas flow year round. Urbanisation has made the flow downstream higher than the natural flow, due to higher surface runoff from roads and houses.

By the 1960s, Lew Whiteman, the owner of much of the land that makes up Whiteman Park today, built a dam across Bennett Brook and deepened a natural pool along the brook to form the Mussel Pool, named due to the naturally occurring freshwater mussels. The area has since become a picnic spot. The dam prevented the seasonal migration of small fish, resulting in the areas upstream of the dam having no fish. A fish ladder was constructed in 1999, allowing the western minnow and western pygmy perch to reach upstream of the dam. The first fish ladder in Australia, it was designed by a Murdoch University zoologist and built by a team of people on the Work for the Dole program.

== Bridges ==
From south to north:

- Benara Road
- Reid Highway, which opened on 25 November 1996
- Marshall Road
- Ellenbrook line, which bridges over the brook at one of it narrowest points

== Fauna ==
Animals found in and around Bennett Brook include:

- Chelodina oblonga – southwestern snake-necked turtle
- Westralunio carteri – species of freshwater mussel
- Isoodon obesulus – quenda or southern brown bandicoot
- Trichosurus vulpecula – brush-tailed possum
- Hydromys chrysogaster – water rat

== Name ==
Bennett Brook is named after Matilda Bennett, the wife of John Septimus Roe.

== See also ==
- Bennett Brook Railway
- List of watercourses in Western Australia
