= Noranda railway station =

Railway station in Australia

Noranda
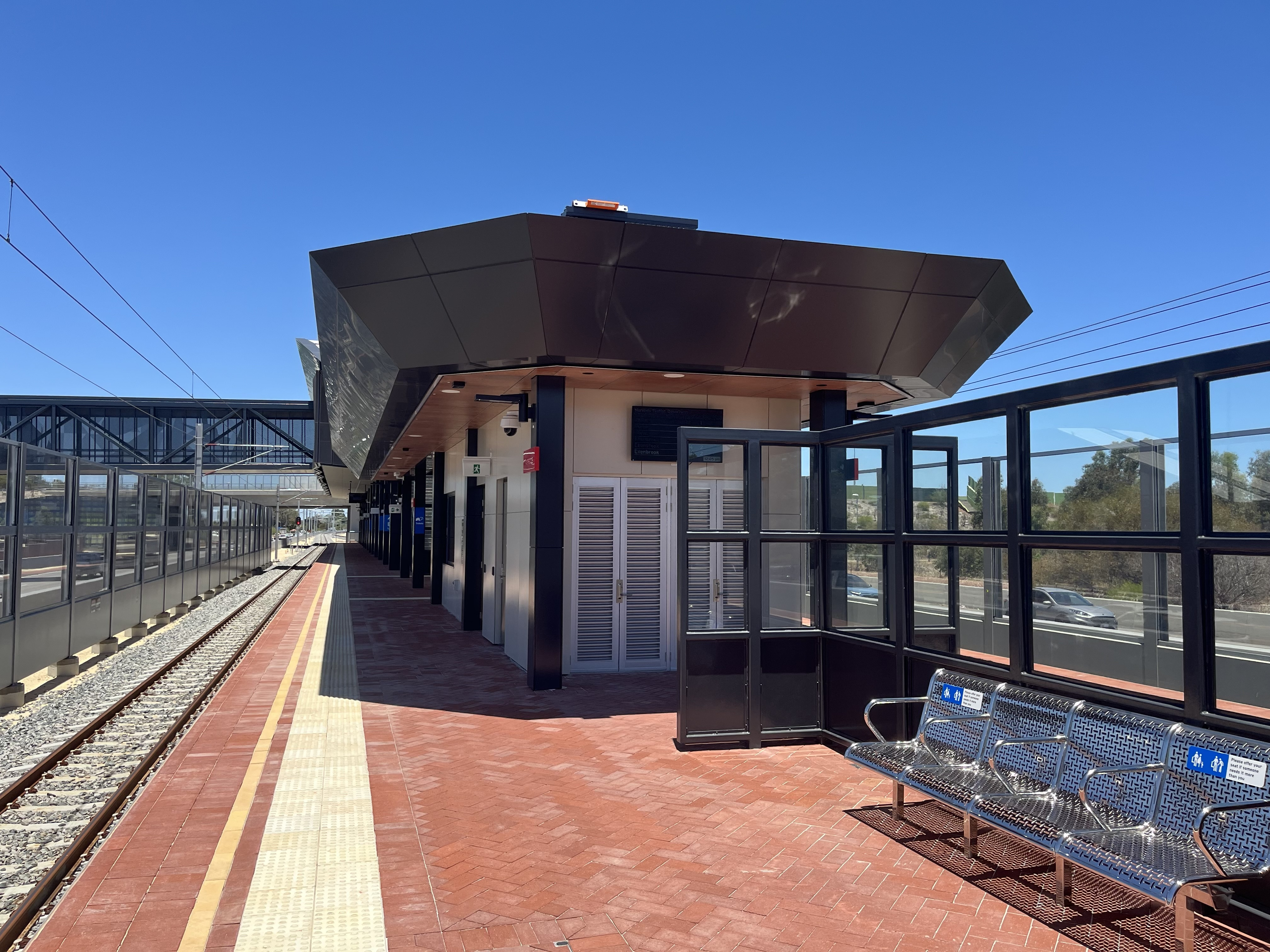
- Station platform

General information
- Location: Tonkin Highway & Benara Road, Noranda / Morley; Western Australia; Australia
- Coordinates: 31°52′26″S 115°55′05″E
- Owner: Public Transport Authority
- Operator: Public Transport Authority
- Line: Ellenbrook line
- Platforms: 1 island platform with 2 platform edges
- Tracks: 2
- Bus stands: 2 (on Benara Road)

Construction
- Parking: 400 bays
- Cycle facilities: Yes
- Accessible: Yes
- Architect: Woods Bagot & TRCB

Other information
- Fare zone: 2

History
- Opened: 8 December 2024

Services
Preceding station	Transperth	Following station
Morley towards Perth	Ellenbrook line	Ballajura towards Ellenbrook
Location
- Location of Noranda station

Noranda railway station is a suburban rail station that is part of the Transperth network. It opened in 2024 as a station on the Ellenbrook line, serving the Perth suburbs of Beechboro, Kiara and Noranda. It is in the median of Tonkin Highway, just north of Benara Road.

There are five trains per hour stopping at Noranda station during peak, reducing to four trains per hour outside peak. A journey to Perth station takes 18 minutes.

== History ==
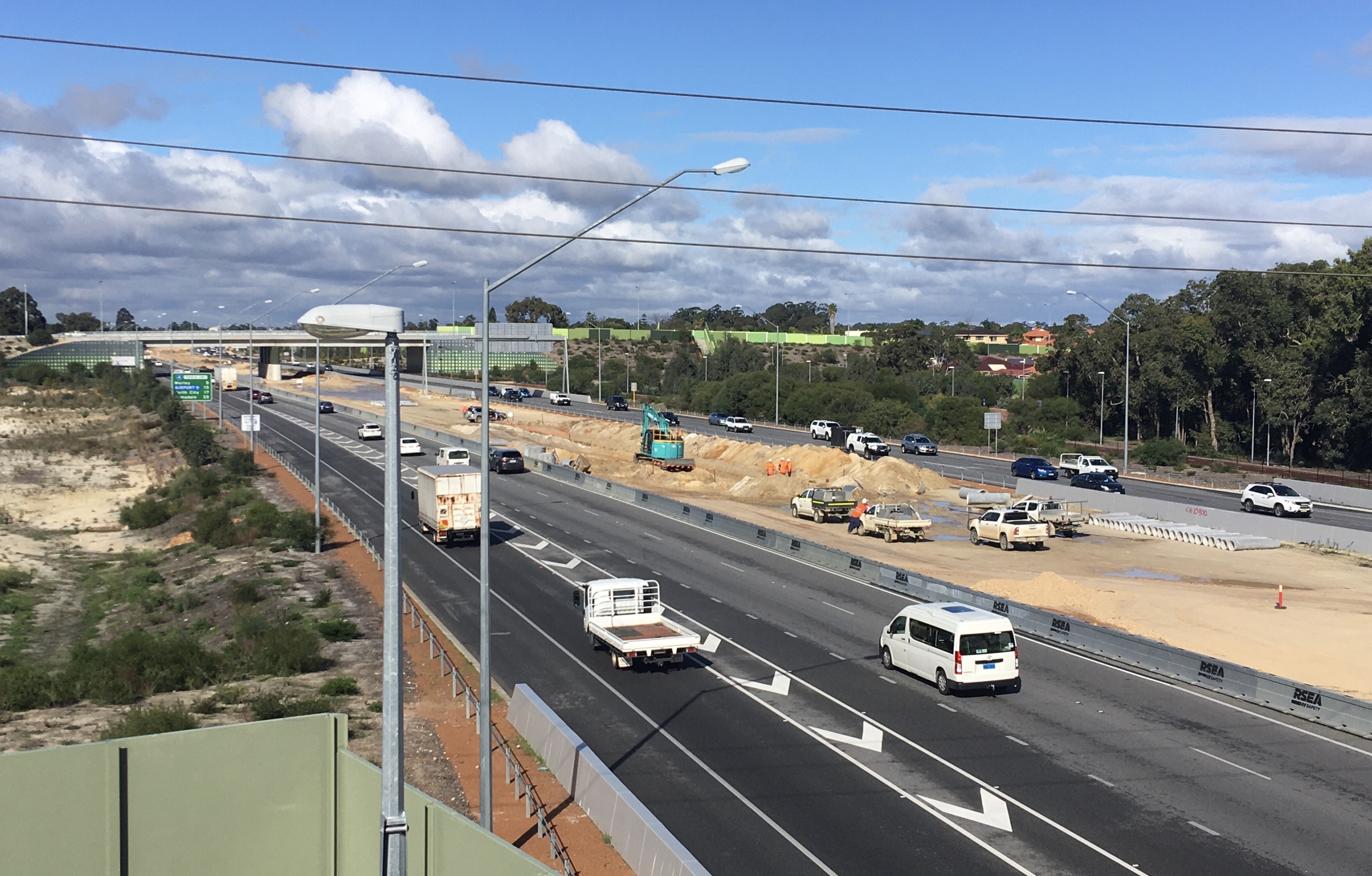
Earthworks in July 2021

In August 2019, the location of the station was revealed. In November 2019, Metronet did a community survey to decide where to put the station car park. The three options were south-west, north-west or north-east of Benara Road and Tonkin Highway. In the end, the north-east option was the most preferred option, with 66% of respondents preferring that option. The reasons included that it does not require a signalised intersection unlike the other options, and it had the largest amount of car bays of the three options.

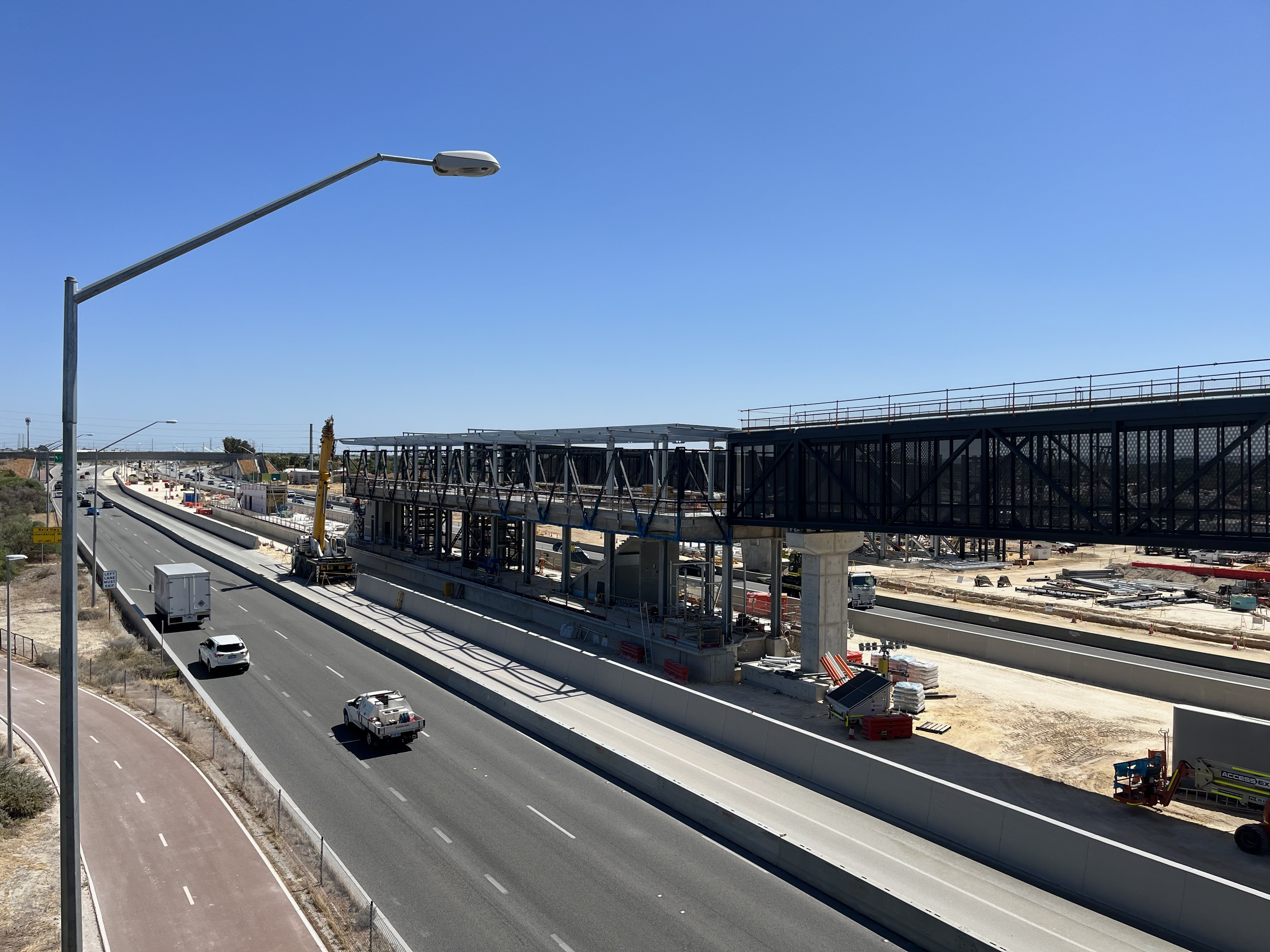
Station construction in January 2024

In September 2020, Laing O'Rourke was announced as the preferred proponent for the construction of the Ellenbrook railway line.

The station and the rest of the line were officially opened on Sunday, 8 December 2024 by Prime Minister Anthony Albanese, Premier Roger Cook and Transport Minister Rita Saffioti, with community events held at each of the five new stations.

== Station design ==
Noranda railway station is just north of Benara Road in the Tonkin Highway median, similar to many stations along the Yanchep and Mandurah lines. Passengers access the station either by a walkway to the Benara Road bridge or a walkway across Tonkin Highway to the carpark. The carpark is located east of Tonkin Highway and can be accessed via Benara Road. It has 400 car bays and a drop off zone. Two bus stands are located on Benara Road, serving route 350 between Mirrabooka bus station and Caversham. A pedestrian underpass under Benara Road allows pedestrians to safely and easily access the station and bus stop. Other facilities at the station include passenger toilets and a kiosk.

== Services ==
=== Train services ===
Noranda is served by Transperth Trains operating along the Ellenbrook line to Perth and Ellenbrook railway stations. A journey to Perth station takes 18 minutes. Noranda station is in fare zone 2. Noranda station is projected to have 1,810 passenger boardings per day in 2031.

==== Platforms ====
Noranda platform arrangement
Stop ID	Platform	Line	Service Pattern	Destination	Via	Notes
99751	1	Ellenbrook line	All stations	Perth		
99752	2	Ellenbrook line	All stations	Ellenbrook		

=== Bus routes ===
Unlike other stations on the Ellenbrook line branch, Noranda station does not feature a bus station interchange. The nearest bus stops are located along Benara Road are serviced by route 350 to Caversham or Mirrabooka bus station as well as 903 train replacement bus services to Ellenbrook or Perth.
