= Benara Road =

Road in Perth, Western Australia

Benara Road Western Australia
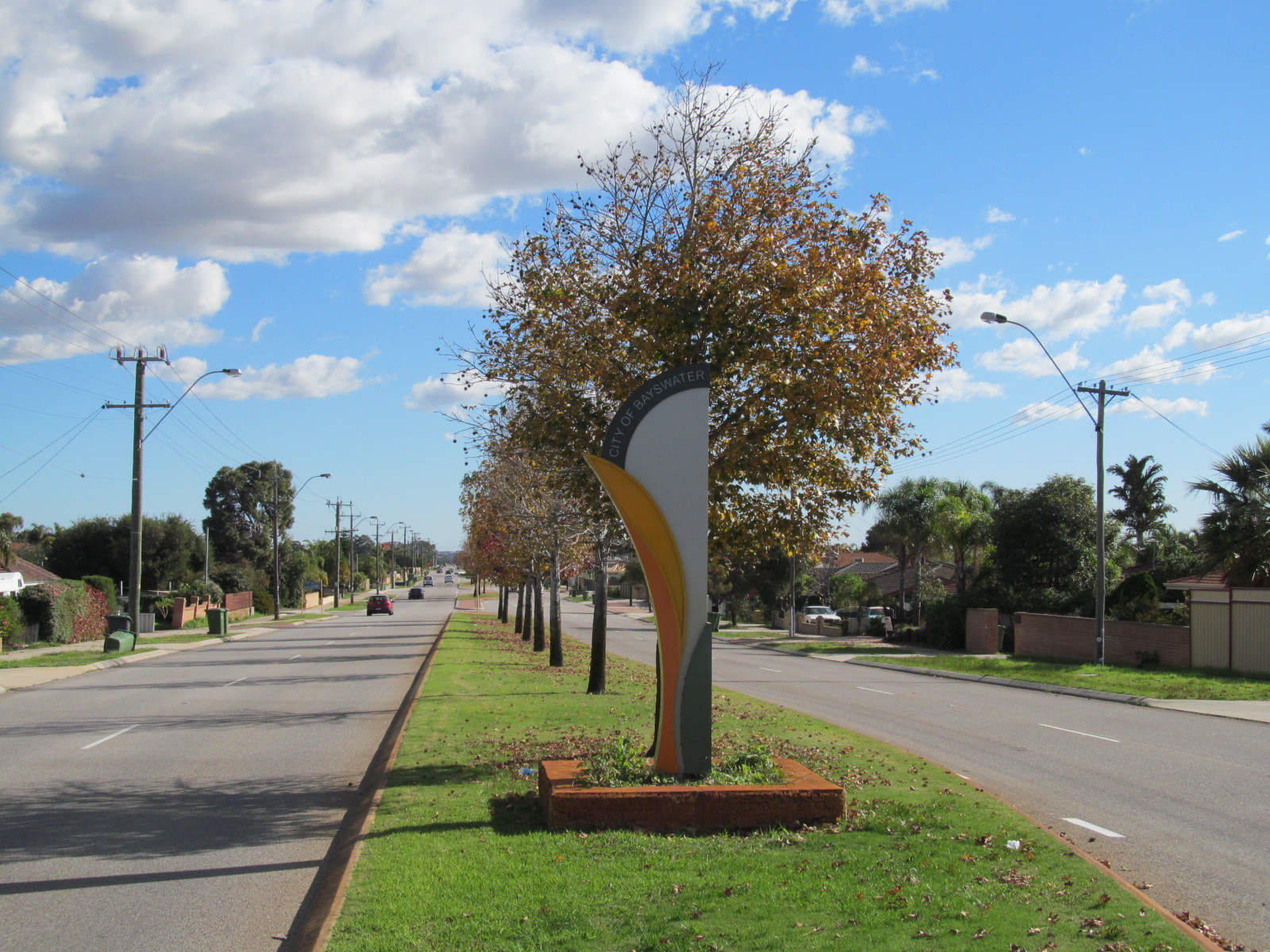
- Benara Road entering the City of Bayswater

General information
- Type: Road
- Length: 8.1 km (5.0 mi)
- Route number(s): State Route 76 (Caversham)

Major junctions
- West end: Camboon Road Noranda
- Beechboro Road North (State Route 53); Lord Street (State Route 76)
- East end: West Swan Road (State Route 52), Caversham

Location(s)
- Major suburbs: Noranda, Beechboro, Caversham

Benara Road is an east–west road in the north-eastern suburbs of Perth, Western Australia.

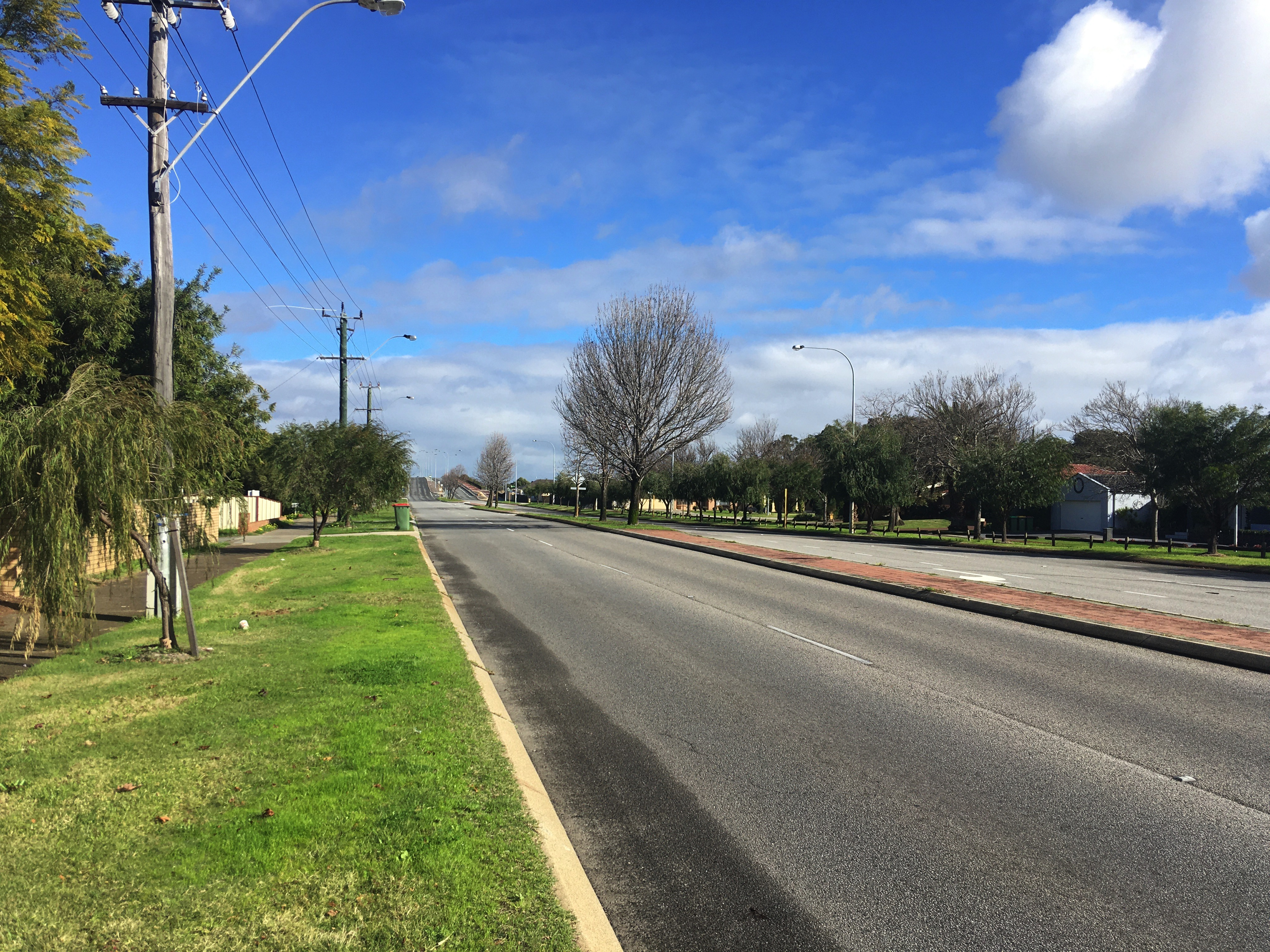
Benara Road near Beechboro Road North

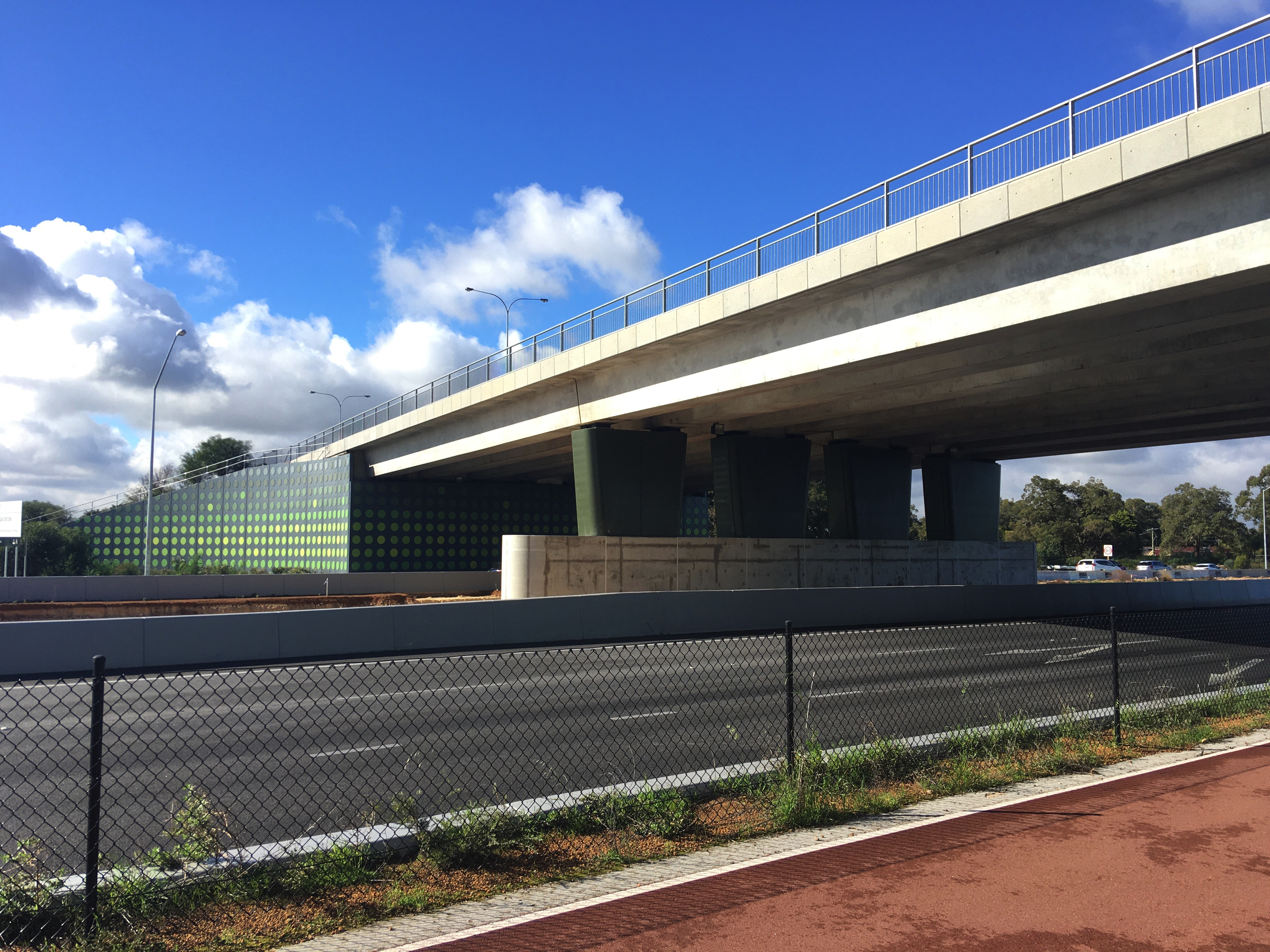
Benara Road bridge over Tonkin Highway

== Route description ==
Benara Road starts off at a roundabout with Camboon Road in Noranda as a two-lane, single carriageway road with a speed limit of 60 km/h (37 mph). The road continues east, in a completely straight line, passing Noranda Shopping Village. 1.2 kilometres (0.75 mi) from the western terminus, just before Holden Drive, Benara Road turns into a four lane dual carriageway, and the speed limit changes to 70 km/h (43 mph), which is what the speed limit is for the rest of the road. 1.5 km (0.93 mi) from Holden Drive, Benara Road passes over Tonkin Highway as a bridge.

1.5 kilometres (0.93 mi) after Tonkin Highway, Benara Road exits the City of Bayswater and enters the City of Swan. The road also changes back to a two lane single carriageway. Just after that, Benara Road passes Kiara College on one side, and Altone Park on the other side. 2.3 km (1.4 mi) after entering the City of Swan, the road intersects with Lord Street, gaining the State Route 76 allocation. Just after that, the road passes over Bennett Brook. Past there, the surrounding area is partially rural, with Vineyards on the side of the road. The road comes to an end shortly after, at a roundabout with West Swan Road, in Caversham. Heading south on West Swan Road leads to Guildford, and heading north leads to Reid Highway, Great Northern Highway and the Swan Valley.

== History ==
Originally when the road was built, it was a two lane road travelling through farms and bushland on the outskirts of Perth. In the 1930s, Benara Road was considered an option for a highway between Midland and the beach. That plan was shelved.

In the 1970s and 1980s, the area around Benara Road gradually shifted from rural to urban, as it was developed. Small areas of farmland still exist near the road's eastern end in Caversham, which is the southernmost extent of the Swan Valley.

Prior to the late 1970s, Benara Road extended west of Camboon Road, however it was cut off west of Camboon Road, and the cut off section was renamed Bramwell Road. Between 1981 and 1985, the road was upgraded to a four lane dual carriageway between Holden Drive and Della Road. On 18 December 1989, the Tonkin Highway extension to Benara Road was opened, as a traffic light controlled intersection, and the dual carriageway section of Benara Road was extended east to Tonkin Highway. Benara Road was the northern terminus of Tonkin Highway until 11 November 1991, when Tonkin Highway was extended north to link to Reid Highway. In the 1990s, several intersections were modified to be roundabout intersections, and between 1995 and 1998, the dual carriageway was extended again, to Danube Avenue, which is still the current extent of the dual carriageway.

From 2016 to 2018, the intersection with Tonkin Highway was converted to a flyover as a part of the NorthLink WA project. An interchange was considered, but it would have been too close to Tonkin Highway's interchange with Reid Highway, so that was not chosen.

As a part of the Ellenbrook railway line, Noranda railway station was built at the flyover of Tonkin Highway. A pedestrian entrance to the station is on the bridge, and the entrance to the station's car park is on Benara Road.

== Future ==
In 2022 and 2023, the City of Swan and Main Roads Western Australia are going to upgrade Benara Road between Lord Street and Bennett Street. The existing two-lane timber bridge over Bennett Brook will be replaced with a four-lane concrete bridge by Main Roads, and the road between the roundabouts with Lord Street and Bennett Street will be upgraded to a four-lane dual carriageway. The City of Swan will upgrade the two roundabouts and their approaches so each roundabout has two lanes.

The City of Swan also has longer term plans for the duplication of the entire portion of Benara Road within its boundaries, between West Swan Road and Danube Avenue, saying that Benara Road is expected to have a traffic volume of more than 16,000 vehicles per day in 2031. The estimated cost is $20.3 million.

== Junction list ==
| LGA | Location | km | mi | Destinations | Notes |
|---|---|---|---|---|---|
| Bayswater | Noranda | 0.0 | 0.0 | Camboon Road – Mirrabooka, Dianella, Morley | Benara Road western terminus; Roundabout intersection |
| Bayswater | Noranda | 0.7 | 0.43 | McGilvray Avenue – Malaga, Morley | Roundabout intersection |
| Bayswater | Noranda | 1.5 | 0.93 | Crimea Street – Ballajura, Malaga, Morley | Traffic light controlled intersection |
| Bayswater | Noranda–Morley border | 2.7 | 1.7 | Tonkin Highway (State Route 4) | Formerly traffic light controlled intersection; currently flyover |
| Bayswater | Morley | 3.4 | 2.1 | Beechboro Road North (State Route 53) – Bennett Springs, Beechboro, Morley | Traffic light controlled intersection |
| Swan | Beechboro–Kiara–Lockridge tripoint | 5.3 | 3.3 | Altone Road – Bennett Springs, Beechboro, Kiara, Lockridge | Traffic light controlled intersection |
| Swan | Beechboro–Lockridge–Caversham | 6.3 | 3.9 | Lord Street (State Route 76) – Beechboro, Lockridge, Eden Hill, Bassendean | State Route 76 concurrency terminus: continues south; Roundabout intersection |
| Swan | Caversham | 6.7 | 4.2 | Bennett Street – Caversham, Dayton, Brabham, Ellenbrook | Roundabout intersection |
| Swan | Caversham | 7.3 | 4.5 | Waldeck Road – Caversham | Roundabout intersection |
| Swan | Caversham | 8.1 | 5.0 | West Swan Road (State Route 52) – Guildford, Caversham, West Swan, Henley Brook | State Route 76 eastern terminus; Roundabout intersection |
Closed/former; Concurrency terminus

== See also ==
- List of major roads in Perth, Western Australia
