= Morley railway station, Perth =

Railway station in Perth, Western Australia

Morley
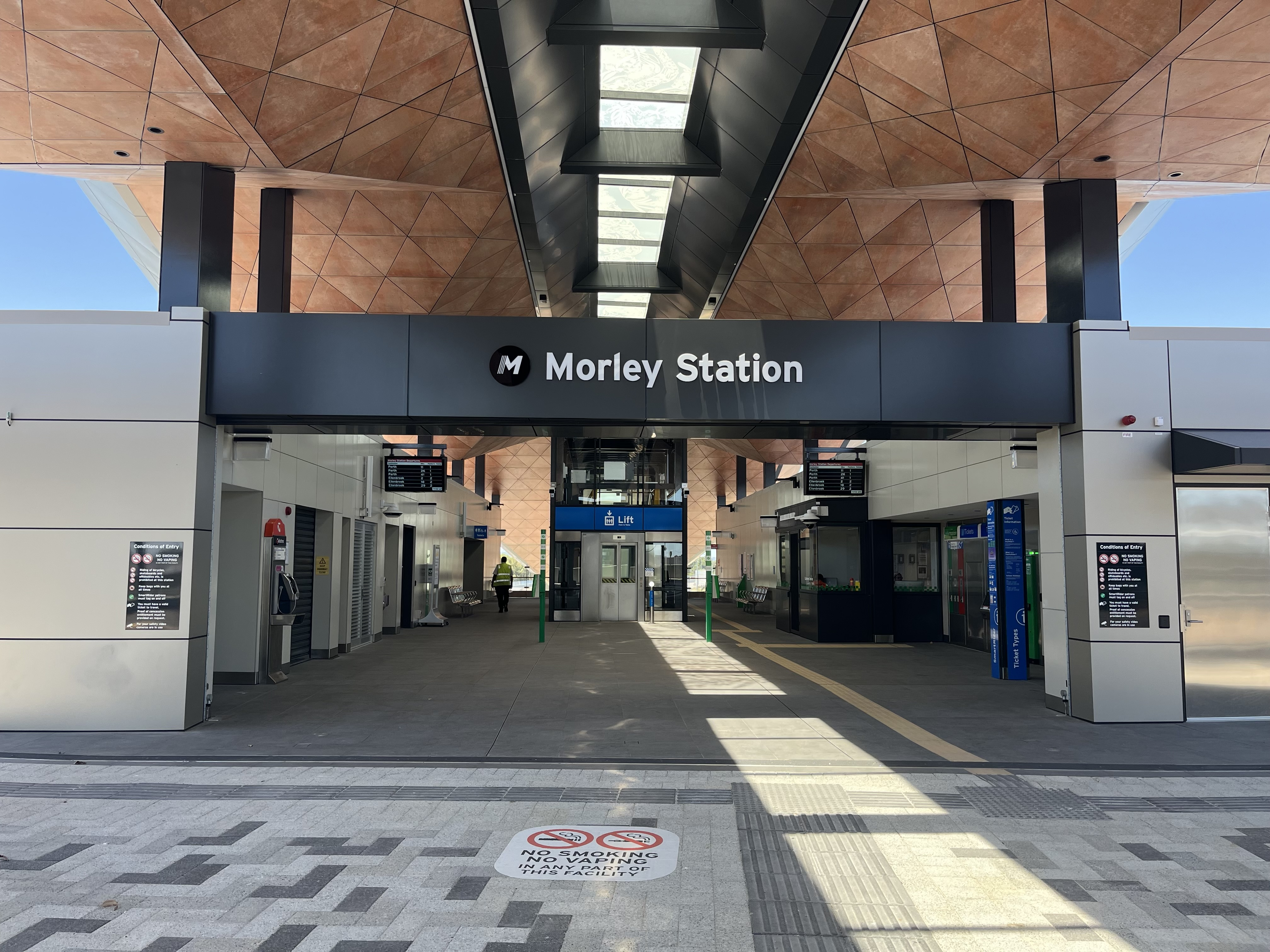
- Station entrance

General information
- Location: Tonkin Highway & Broun Avenue, Embleton / Morley; Western Australia; Australia
- Coordinates: 31°53′46″S 115°55′12″E
- Owner: Public Transport Authority
- Operator: Public Transport Authority
- Line: Ellenbrook line
- Distance: 10.3 km (6.4 mi) from Perth
- Platforms: 1 island platform with 2 platform edges
- Tracks: 2
- Bus stands: 12
- Connections: Bus

Construction
- Parking: 400 bays
- Cycle facilities: Yes
- Accessible: Yes
- Architect: Woods Bagot & TRCB

Other information
- Fare zone: 2

History
- Opened: 8 December 2024

Services
Preceding station	Transperth	Following station
Bayswater towards Perth	Ellenbrook line	Noranda towards Ellenbrook
Location
- Location of Morley station

Morley railway station is a suburban railway station on the Ellenbrook line in Embleton and Morley, suburbs of Perth, Western Australia. Located in the median strip of Tonkin Highway at the Broun Avenue flyover, Morley station consists of an island platform at ground level with entrances on both sides of the Broun Avenue bridge. A bus interchange is located on the southern side of the bridge and a multi-storey car park is to the south-west.

Early works under the Tonkin Gap project started in November 2020, which included the replacement of the Broun Avenue bridge, which occurred throughout 2022. The main contract for the construction of the Ellenbrook line was awarded to Laing O'Rourke in October 2020. Morley station reached completion in November 2024, and on 8 December 2024, the Ellenbrook line opened.

During peak, trains stop at Morley station every twelve minutes in each direction, increasing to every fifteen minutes off-peak and on weekends and public holidays. At night, trains are half-hourly or hourly. The journey to Perth station takes fifteen minutes. Feeder bus routes serve the surrounding area, including the Galleria Shopping Centre.

== Description ==
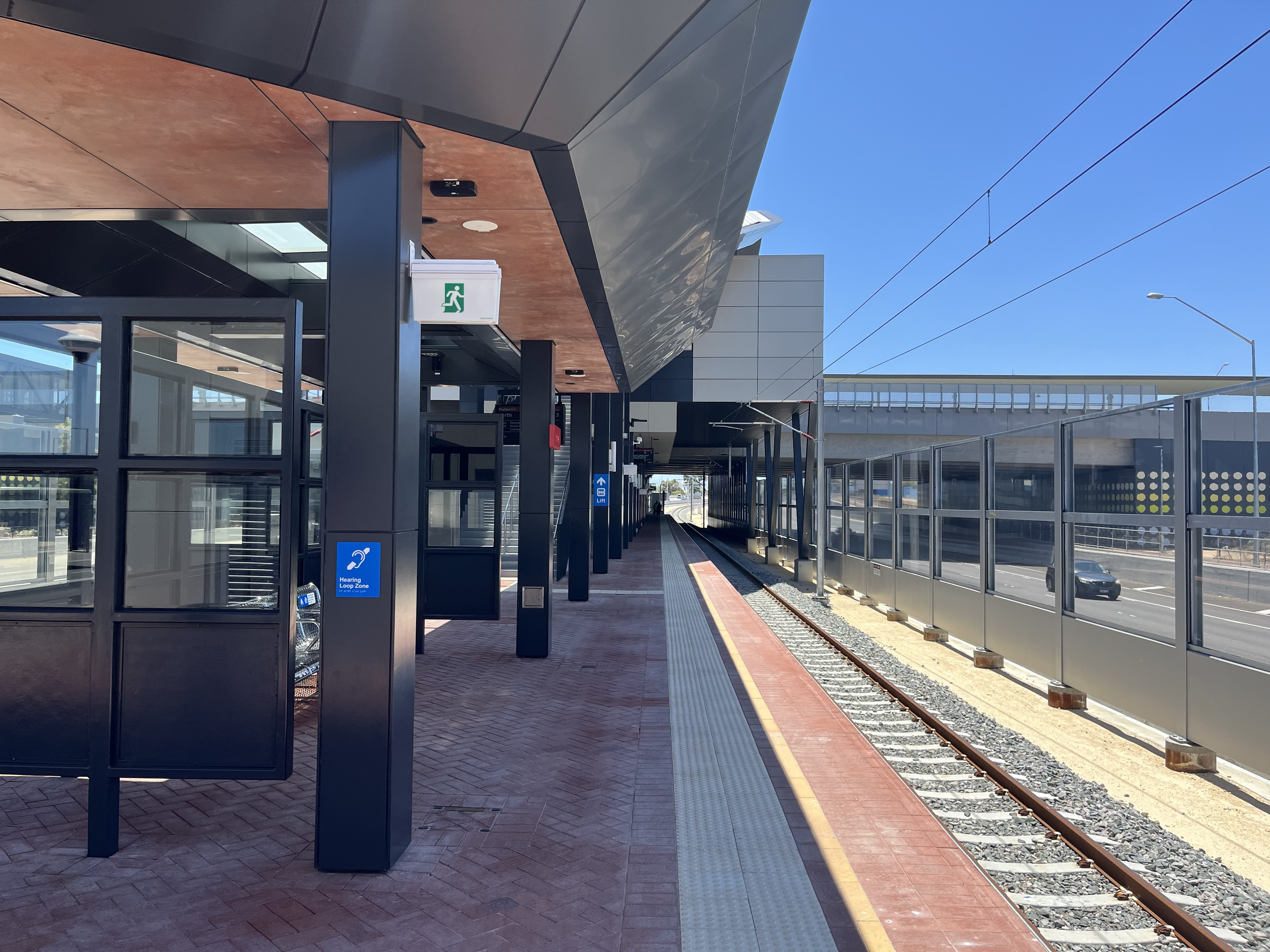
Station platform

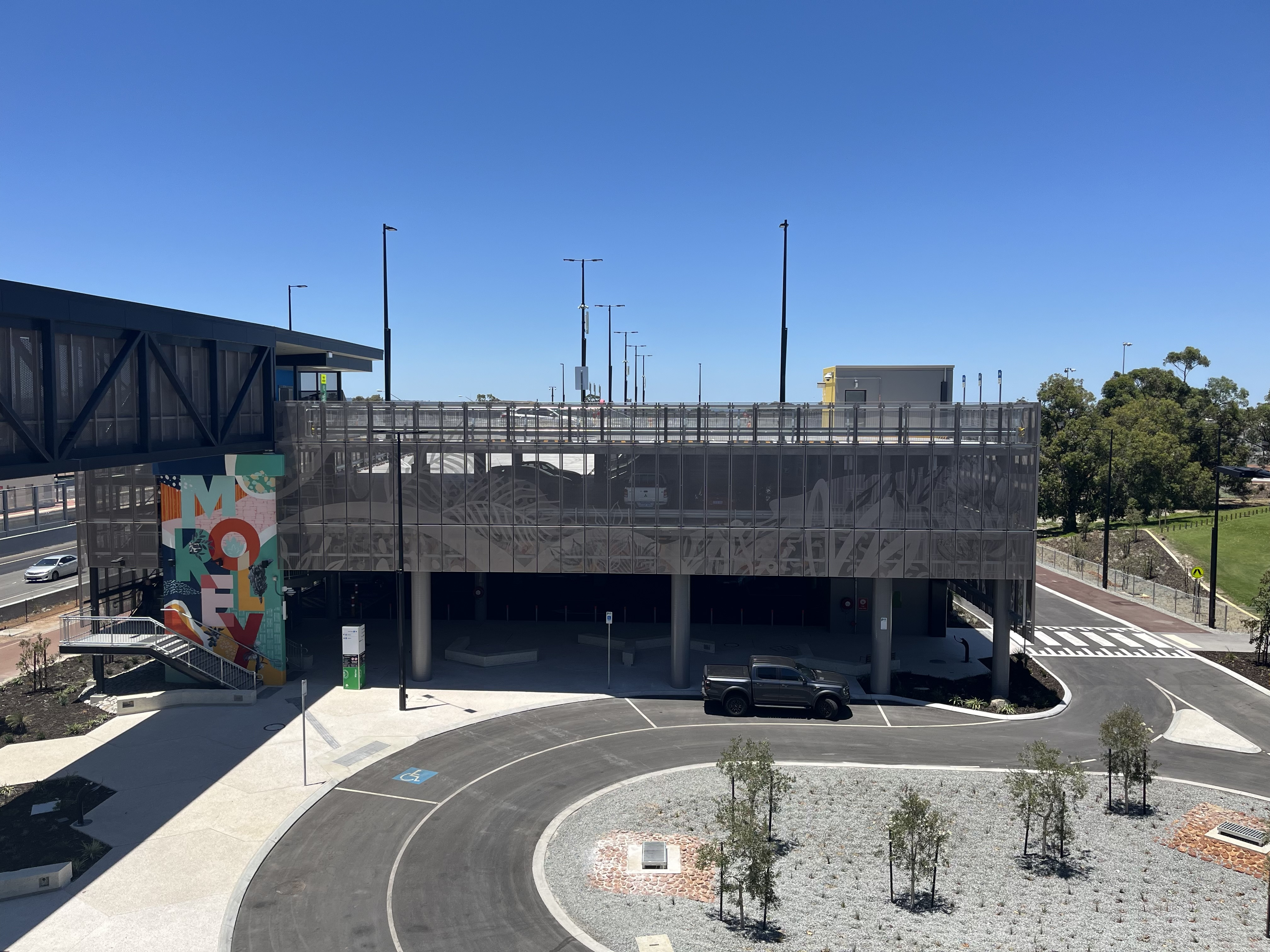
Multi-storey car park

Morley station is located on the boundary of Embleton and Morley, north-eastern suburbs of Perth, Western Australia. The station is within the median strip of Tonkin Highway at the Broun Avenue flyover and is on the Ellenbrook line, which is part of the Transperth system. The next stations are Noranda to the north and Bayswater to the south, where the Ellenbrook line connects to the Airport and Midland lines. Morley station is 10.3 kilometres (6.4 mi) from Perth station and is in fare zone two.

Morley station consists of an island platform within the Tonkin Highway median strip underneath a bridge. The station has entrances on both sides of the bridge, each with stairs and lifts. On the southern portion of the bridge is a bus interchange with twelve bus stands, while the northern side of the bridge is for Broun Avenue. In the south-west quadrant is a multi-storey car park with four hundred parking bays. Other facilities include toilets, bike shelters and a kiosk. The station is fully accessible.

== History ==
=== Early history ===
The 1955 Plan for the Metropolitan Region, Perth and Fremantle, also known as the Stephenson–Hepburn Report, proposed a 7 1/2-mile (12 km) railway line branching off the Eastern Railway (Midland line) at Bayswater, then heading north through Morley to reach Walter Road and then north-west to terminate near Wanneroo Road. When the Metropolitan Region Scheme was adopted in 1963, the land for the proposed railway was not reserved.

The North-East Corridor Structure Plan was published in 1994, and called for the rezoning of Ellenbrook for urban development and the reservation of a public transport corridor to Ellenbrook. Later that year, the government commissioned the North-East Corridor Transit Route Reserve Study to determine a route for the corridor between the Reid Highway / Lord Street junction and the Midland line. The route recommended by the study was via the Tonkin Highway median strip, with one of the reasons being that the route is the closest to the Morley regional centre. The study did not consider a station at Broun Avenue, only considering stations for Morley at Walter Road or Morley Drive, with the Walter Road site favoured due to there being no highway interchange there. In 1996, the land required for that route was reserved in the Metropolitan Region Scheme, including a small section of land at Walter Road on the east side of Tonkin Highway.

=== Construction ===
Constructing the Ellenbrook line by 2023 as part of the Metronet project was committed to by the Labor Party before it won the 2017 state election. During planning and construction, the line was known as the Morley–Ellenbrook line. The route of the Ellenbrook line was officially revealed in August 2019, confirming that it would run in the Tonkin Highway median strip and that Morley station would be located at Broun Avenue.

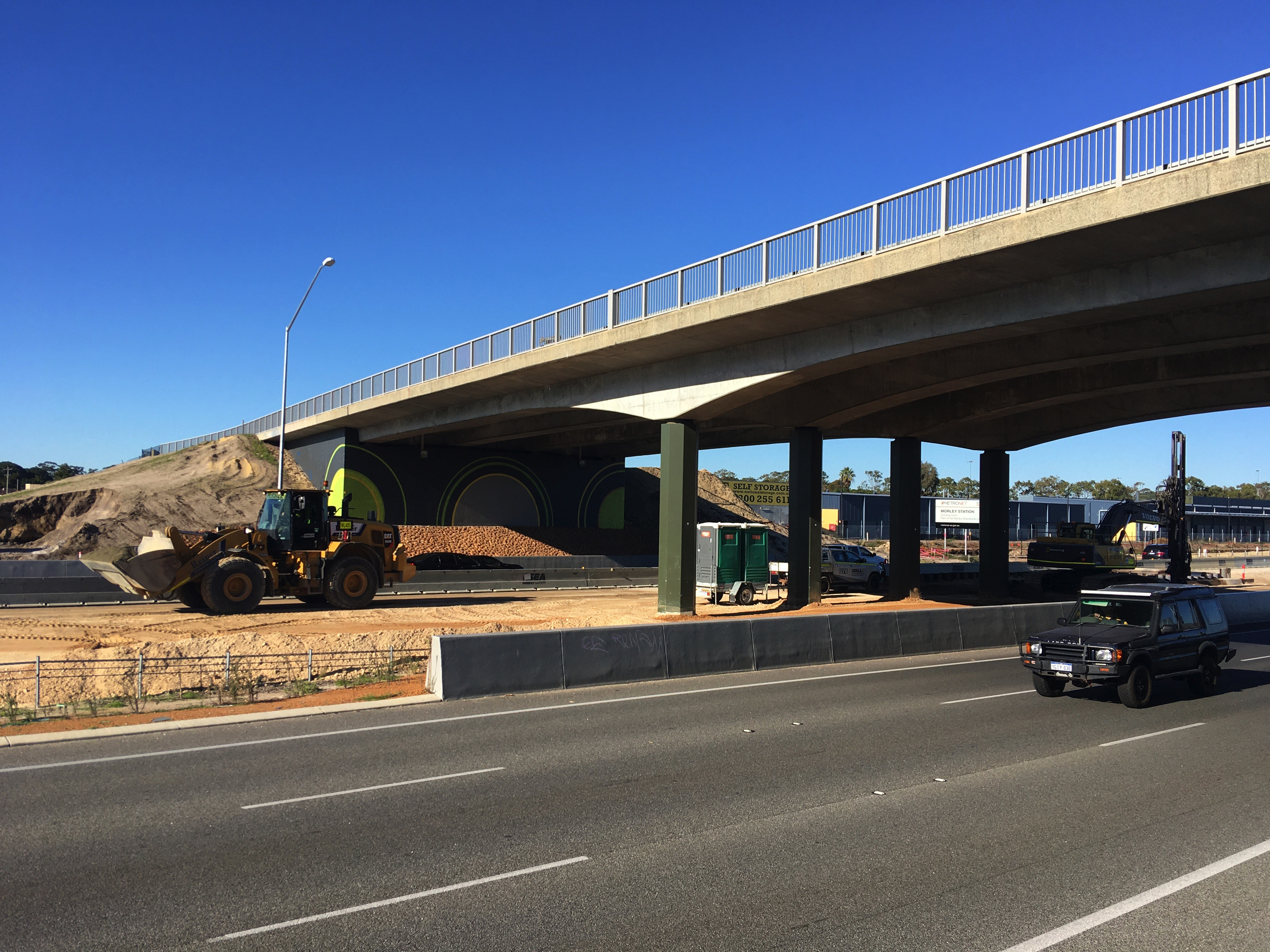
The old Broun Avenue bridge and Tonkin Gap works within the Tonkin Highway median strip, June 2021

As part of the Tonkin Gap project, enabling works were completed for the Ellenbrook line, which included modifications to drainage and barriers along Tonkin Highway and a rebuild of the Broun Avenue bridge for the Morley station bus interchange. Construction for the Tonkin Gap Ellenbrook line enabling works began in November 2020.

The A$753 million main construction contract for the Morley–Ellenbrook line was awarded to the MELconnx Consortium, consisting of Laing O'Rourke, in October 2020.

In April 2022, the thirty-eight-year-old Broun Avenue bridge was demolished, which required a weekend shutdown of Tonkin Highway. The final bridge beam out of eighteen beams was installed by September 2022.

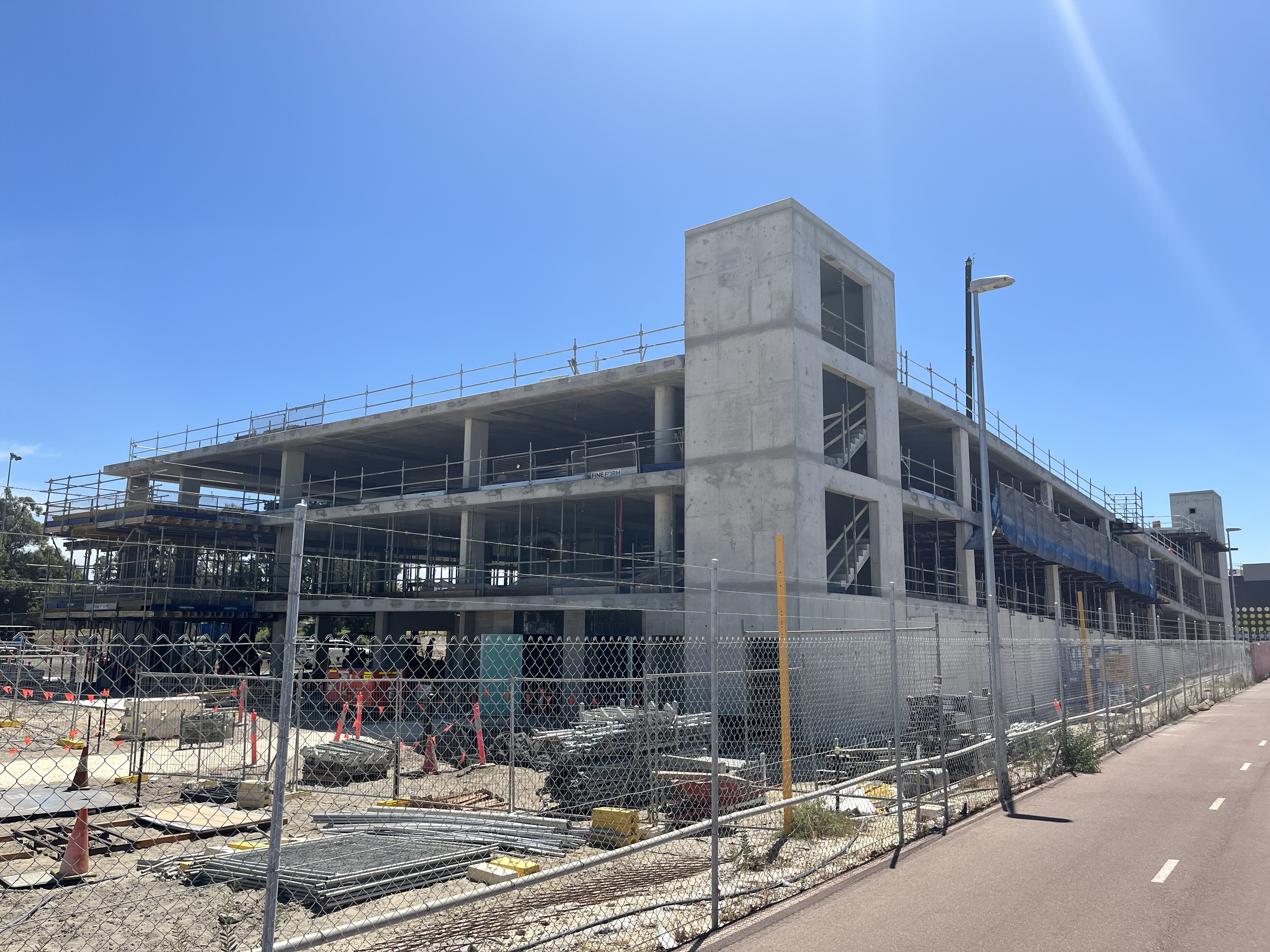
Multi-storey car park under construction, February 2024

To make way for the Morley station multi-storey car park, the Wotton Skate Park had to be relocated. After several different locations were considered, the opposite side of Wotton Reserve was chosen as the location for the new skate park. The skate park was built by the City of Bayswater using $2.5 million of state government funding. Construction began in April 2022. The new City of Bayswater Skate Park opened to the public in November 2022. On 10 December 2022, a 3.9-metre-tall (13 ft) and 13.5-metre-wide (44 ft) vert ramp, the largest one in Perth, was opened.

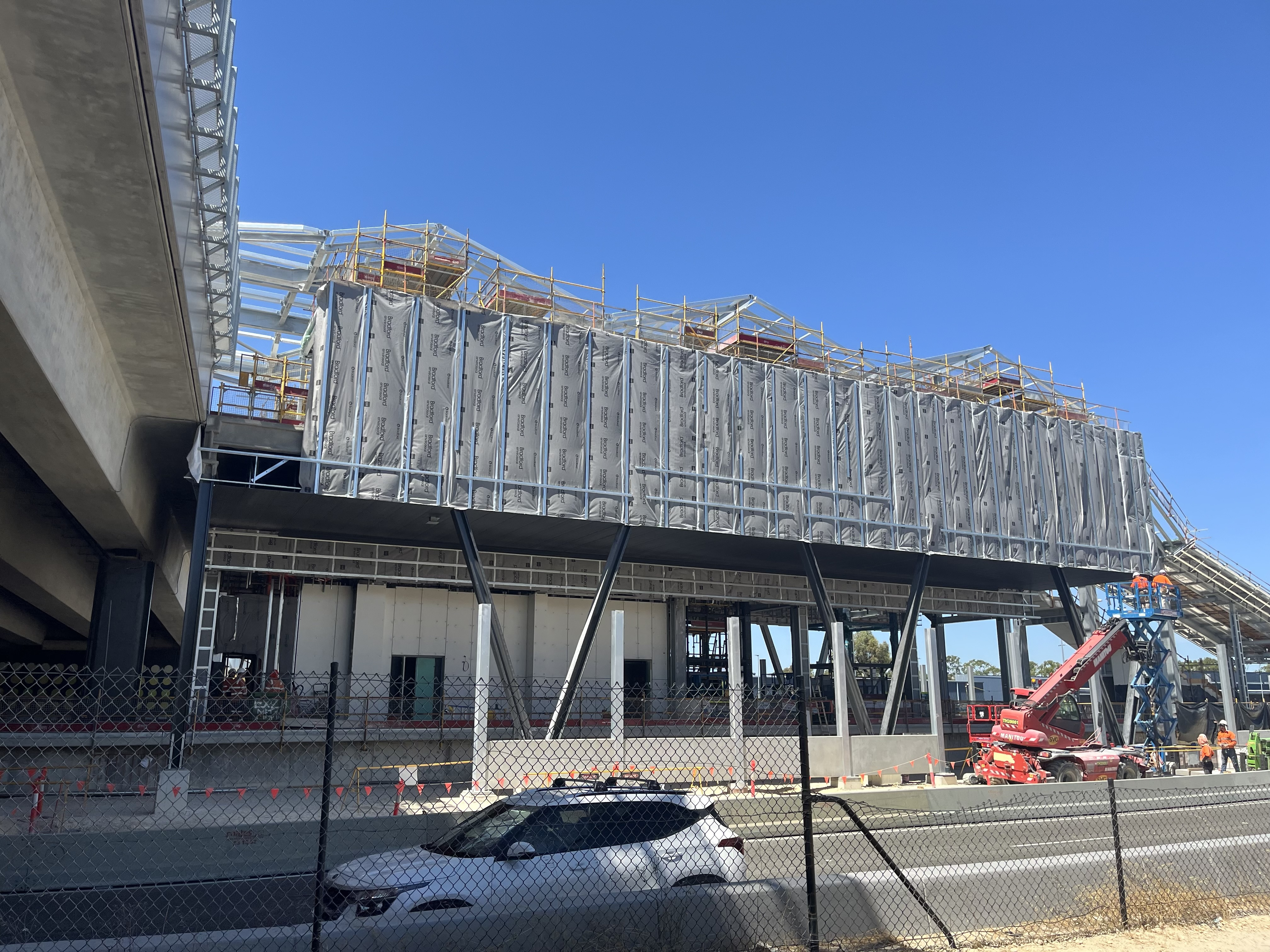
Morley station under construction, February 2024

By November 2024, Morley station was complete. The station and the rest of the line were officially opened on Sunday, 8 December 2024 by Prime Minister Anthony Albanese, Premier Roger Cook and Transport Minister Rita Saffioti, with community events held at each of the five new stations. To avoid confusion with Morley station, the existing Morley bus station at the Galleria Shopping Centre was renamed Galleria bus station upon the Ellenbrook line's opening.

== Services ==
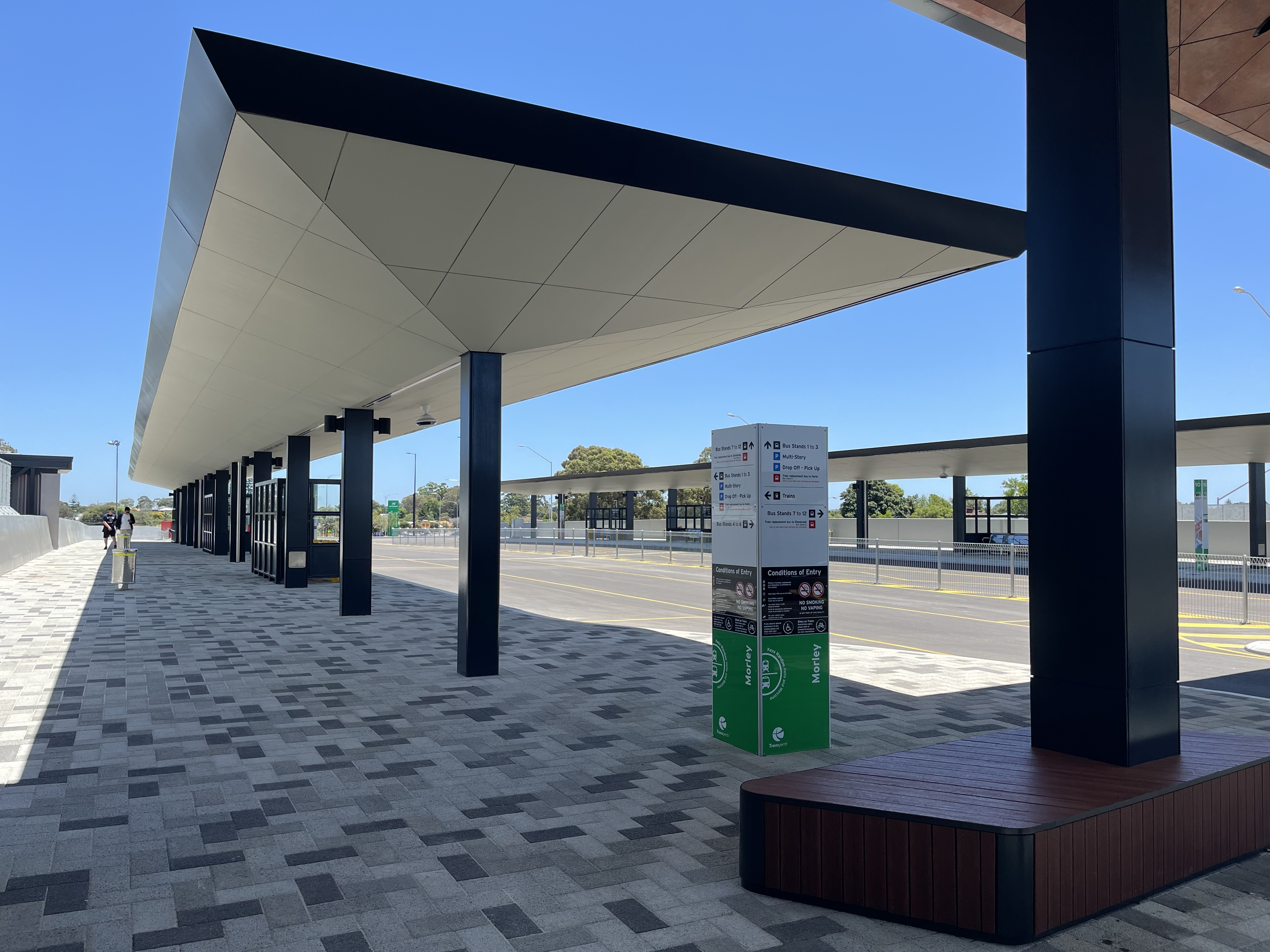
Bus interchange on the bridge across Tonkin Highway

=== Train services ===
Morley station is served by Transperth Ellenbrook line trains, which travel from Perth station in the CBD to Ellenbrook station in Perth's Northeast. These services are operated by the Public Transport Authority.

During peak, trains stop at Morley station every twelve minutes in each direction, increasing to every fifteen minutes off-peak and on weekends and public holidays. At night, trains are half-hourly or hourly. The journey to Perth station takes fifteen minutes. It is projected that Morley station will have 1,365 daily boardings by 2031.

==== Platforms ====
Morley platform arrangement
Stop ID	Platform	Line	Service Pattern	Destination	Via	Notes
99741	1	Ellenbrook line	All stations	Perth		
99742	2	Ellenbrook line	All stations	Ellenbrook		

=== Bus routes ===
Eight regular bus routes serve Morley station. Route 46 runs to Bayswater station and route 47 runs to Bassendean station. Route 352 runs to Galleria bus station. Routes 353, 354 and 356 run between Galleria bus station and Ballajura station via Morley station. Route 950, which is the most frequent bus route in Perth, runs to Queen Elizabeth II Medical Centre via Galleria bus station, Elizabeth Quay bus station and the University of Western Australia. Route 950X is a limited stops version of the 950. Rail replacement bus services operate as route 903.
