= Noranda, Western Australia =

Noranda
- Suburb
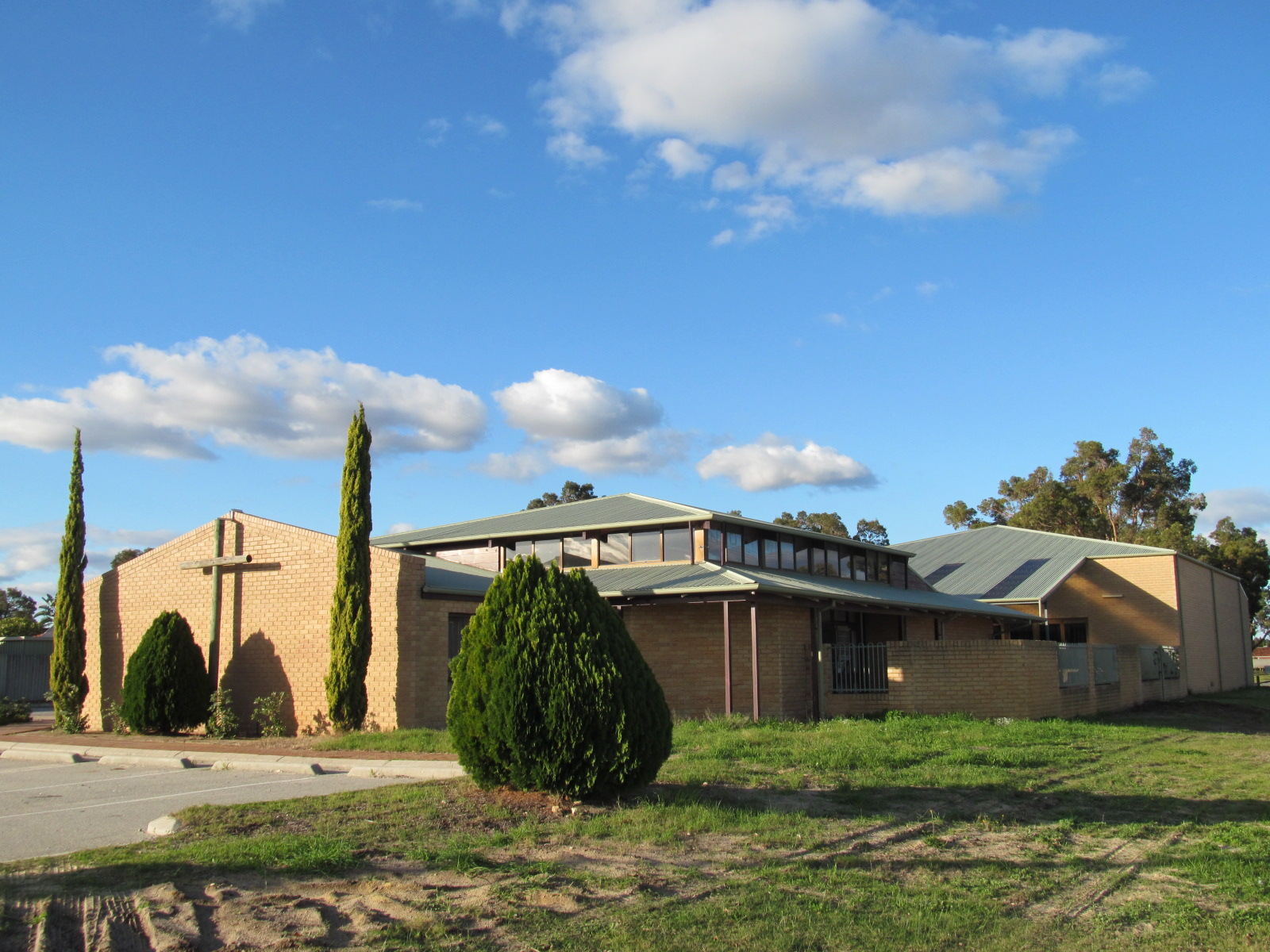
- Noranda Church of Christ
- Interactive map of Noranda
- Coordinates: 31.875°S 115.889°E
- Country: Australia
- State: Western Australia
- City: Perth
- LGA: City of Bayswater
- Location: 12 km (7.5 mi) NE of Perth

Government
  - State electorate: Morley
  - Federal division: Hasluck

Area
  - Total: 5 km^{2} (1.9 sq mi)

Population
  - Total: 8,002 (SAL 2021)
- Postcode: 6062
Suburbs around Noranda
| Mirrabooka | Malaga | Beechboro |
| Dianella | Noranda | Morley |
| Dianella | Morley | Morley |

Noranda is a suburb of Perth, Western Australia, located in the City of Bayswater.

The suburb was named in 1977 after Noranda Park, a town in the U.S. state of Florida. The portion north of Widgee Road was transferred to the City of Bayswater from the City of Swan on 1 July 2016. The suburb is a middle- to upper-middle class area with some affluent pockets. The population consists largely of families of white collar workers.

== Facilities ==
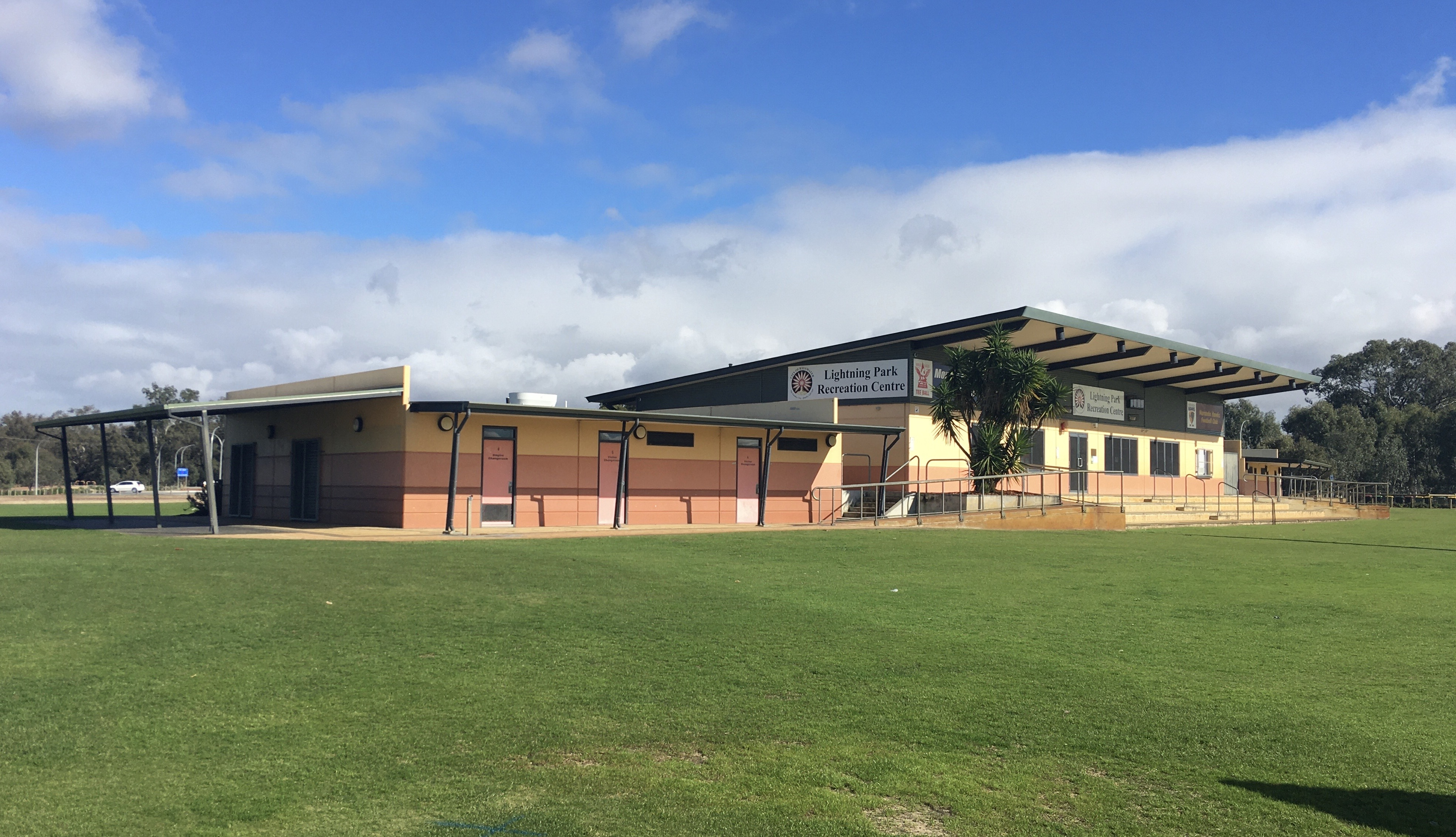
Lightning Park Recreation Centre

Noranda is serviced by bus routes (Routes 344, 346, 347 and 371) that run to Galleria Bus Station, and two routes (371 and 344) that run to Warwick railway station. The main shopping centre in the suburb is Hawaiian's Noranda (formerly Noranda Palms Shopping Centre, and Noranda Square Shopping Centre). The suburb has a number of junior sporting clubs including the Noranda Hawks Football Club, Noranda Junior Cricket Club, Noranda City Football Club and serves as a district in the WA Netball Association. The netball association provides a number of clubs and this in turn supports a large number of young children from neighbouring suburbs.

Lightning Swamp Bushland and Lightning Park Recreation Centre are both in Noranda.

== Education ==
The suburb contains one high school – Morley Senior High School – and two state primary schools – Noranda Primary School and Camboon Primary School. Private schools located near the suburb include Chisholm Catholic College, John Septimus Roe Anglican Community School and St Andrew's Grammar School.

== Transport ==
=== Bus ===
- 350 Mirrabooka Bus Station to Caversham - serves Widgee Road, Camboon Road, Benara Road and Noranda Station
- 351 Ballajura Station to Galleria Bus Station – serves McGilvray Avenue, Benara Road and Crimea Street
- 352 Morley Station to Galleria Bus Station – serves McGilvray Avenue, Benara Road, and Emberson Road
- 361 Alexander Heights Shopping Centre to Galleria Bus Station – serves Widgee Road and Camboon Road

=== Train ===
Ellenbrook Line

- Noranda Station
