= Caversham, Western Australia =

Suburb of Perth, Western Australia

Caversham
- Suburb
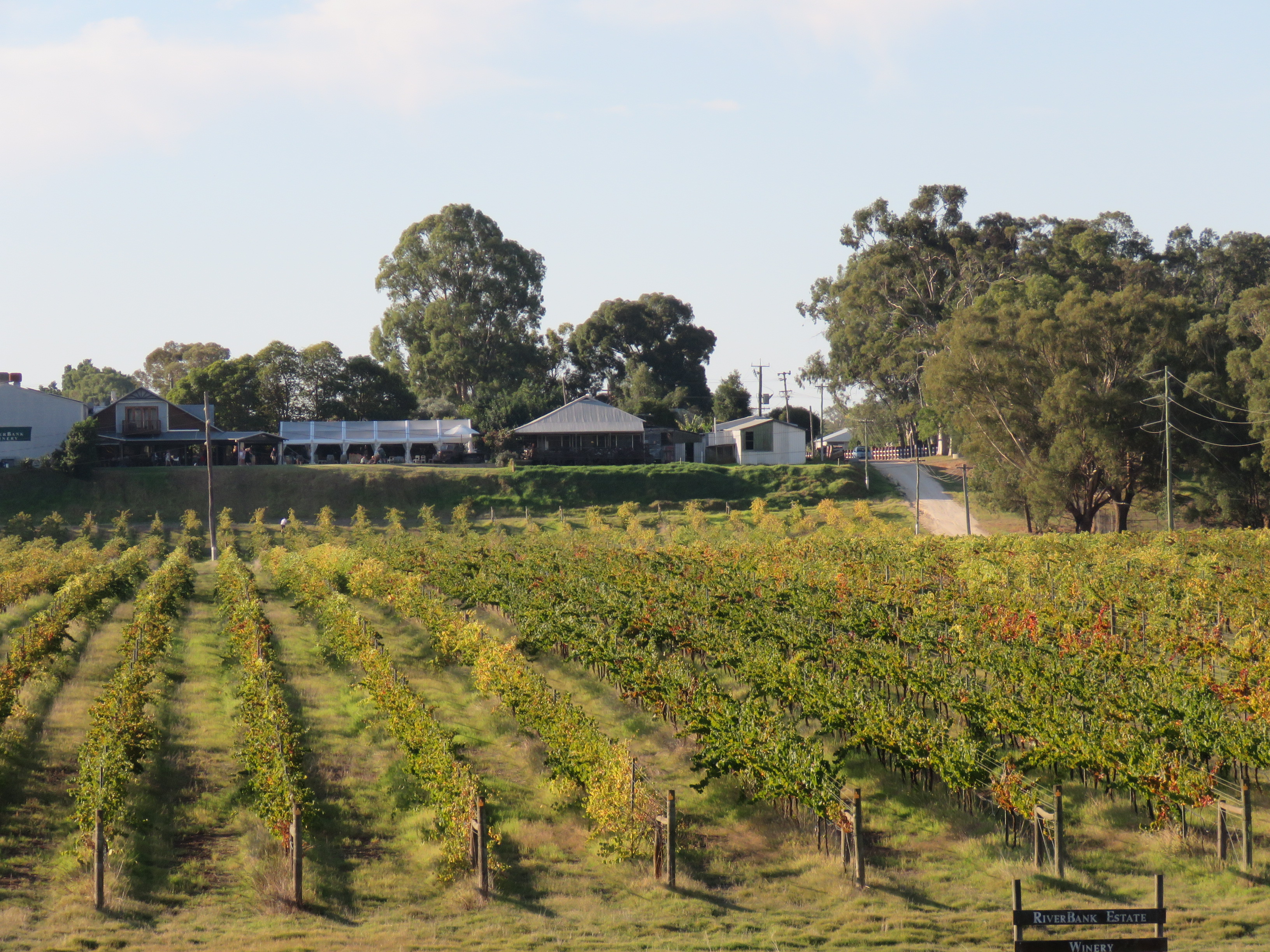
- The Riverbank Estate Winery at Caversham in 2021
- Interactive map of Caversham
- Coordinates: 31.875°S 115.975°E
- Country: Australia
- State: Western Australia
- City: Perth
- LGA: City of Swan

Government
  - State electorates: Midland; Bassendean
  - Federal division: Hasluck

Population
  - Total: 7,419 (SAL 2021)
- Postcode: 6055
Suburbs around Caversham
Beechboro	Dayton	Middle Swan
Lockridge	Caversham	Viveash
Eden Hill	Guildford	Woodbridge

Caversham is a suburb of Perth, Western Australia, located in the City of Swan.

It contains many wineries as part of the Swan Valley wine region. It is the location of brick and tile manufacturers, with Brisbane & Wunderlich establishing a tile manufacturing factory in 1953. It has long been associated with agricultural pursuits and has regularly had a show.

It has also been the location of child welfare properties such as Riverbank. In the 2000s Caversham was the location of a detention centre known as the Disability Justice Centre. The Hall - originally known as the Soldiers and Sailors Memorial Hall built in 1921, was replaced by the Caversham and District Memorial Hall.

It also was the location of the Caversham Wildlife Park, which has since moved into Whiteman Park.

It was the location of a war-time airstrip, the Caversham Airfield, which was later utilised as a motor-raceway.

== Transport ==
=== Bus ===
- 350 Caversham to Mirrabooka Bus Station – serves Benara Road
- 357 Whiteman Park Station to Bassendean Station – serves Suffolk Street, Patricia Street, Bennett Street, Daviot Road, Benara Road and Lord Street
- 358 Whiteman Park Station to Midland Station – serves Suffolk Street
