= Emu Swamp =

Wetland in Ballajura, Western Australia

- Emu Swamp Reserve
- Interactive map of Emu Swamp
- Nearest city: Perth
- Coordinates: 31°50′43″S 115°52′48″E

Emu Swamp is a forested wetland located in Ballajura near the boundary with Koondoola. The reserve is characterized as a swamp, a wetland dominated by tree vegetation, and it includes features such as a lake, a pond, and a stream.

The area encompasses a variety of natural features typical of a wetland ecosystem.
