= West Coast Drive =

Road in Perth, Western Australia

West Coast Drive Western Australia
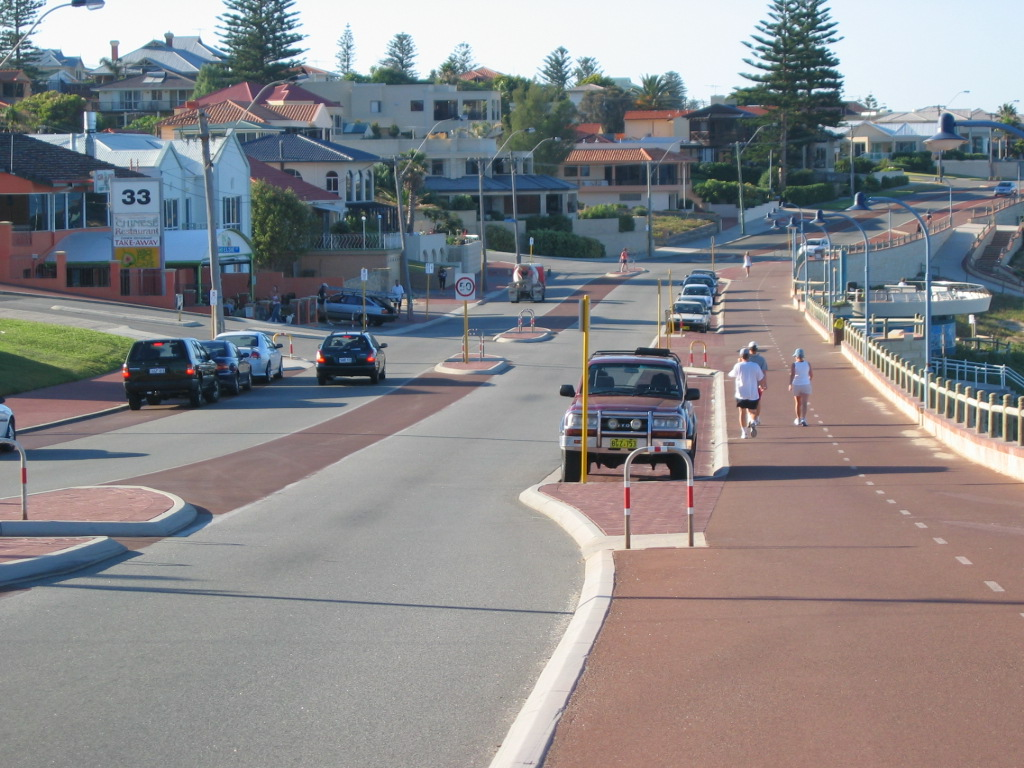
- West Coast Drive near Watermans Bay

General information
- Type: Road
- Length: 7 km (4.3 mi)
- Opened: 1930s
- Tourist routes: Tourist Drive 204 (north of Karrinyup Road)

Major junctions
- South end: West Coast Highway (State Route 71 / Tourist Drive 204), Trigg Beach
- Karrinyup Road (Tourist Drive 204); North Beach Road; Beach Road
- North end: Hepburn Avenue(State Route 82); Whitfords Avenue (Tourist Drive 204), Hillarys

Location(s)
- Major suburbs: North Beach, Watermans Bay, Marmion, Sorrento

West Coast Drive is a scenic north-south route along the Indian Ocean in the northern suburbs of Perth, Western Australia.

== History ==
The road was initially a street which formed part of North Beach, which from the 1920s onwards was a coastal village which served as a holiday destination for Perth residents. During the Great Depression a tent city was located at the North Beach Road intersection. The road had to navigate around the original Hamersley family residence at Beachton Street, but this was demolished in 1961 under Town Planning Scheme No.14 which was drafted in 1959 by the Shire of Perth in order that the road could be straightened. In 1967, the road was extended north to the newly built Sacred Heart College, Sorrento.

Before 1985, West Coast Drive was part of West Coast Highway and connected through to Scarborough. However, the demands of massive urban growth in the northern suburbs necessitated the extension of Marmion Avenue to Scarborough. West Coast Drive was cut off in Trigg and southbound traffic directed onto Karrinyup Road.

In recent years, two- and three-storey houses, often with wide front windows and balconies, have been constructed along the east side of the road.

Views along West Coast Drive

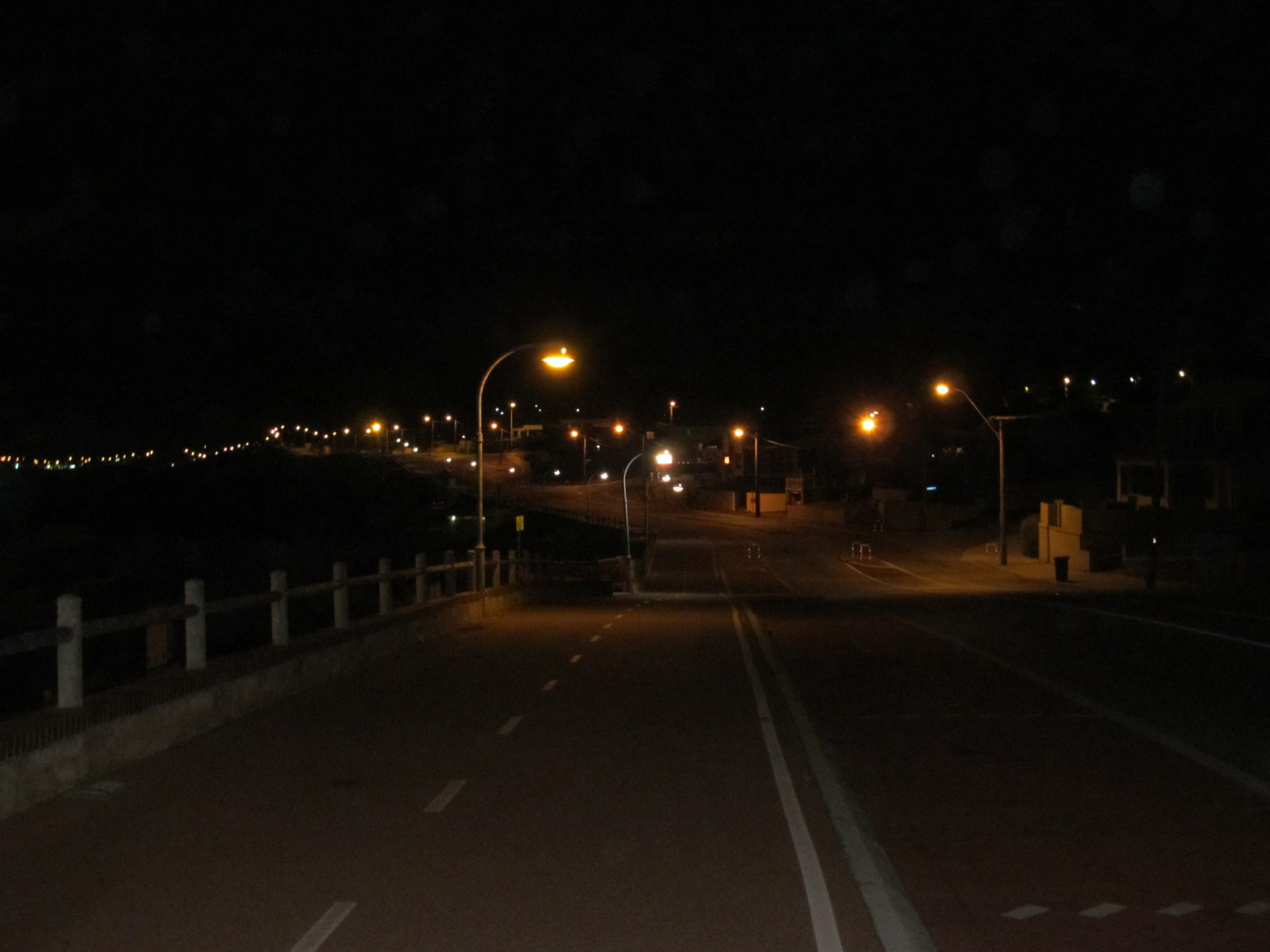
Looking north from near Watermans Bay at night

Travelling south from Hillarys to Karrinyup Road

== Public transportation ==
Until 2015, during the summer its entire length, which is mostly a single-carriageway road with one lane in each direction and many curves, was served by Transperth bus routes ferrying passengers between the beaches, including Mettams Pool at Trigg, Watermans Beach, Marmion Beach and Sorrento Beach. Transperth abolished route 458 in 2015, and the still existing route 423 serves only the northern part of West Coast Drive.

== Major intersections ==
All intersections below are controlled by roundabouts unless otherwise indicated.

LGA	Location	km	mi	Destinations	Notes
Joondalup	Hillarys–Sorrento boundary	0.0	0.0	Hepburn Avenue (State Route 82) – Padbury, Greenwood, Ballajura, Hillarys Boat Harbour	Northern terminus. Continues as Whitfords Avenue (Tourist Drive 204) north.
Joondalup–Stirling boundary	Marmion–Watermans Bay boundary	3.0	1.9	Beach Road – Duncraig, Warwick, Balga, Malaga	Unsignalised T-intersection
Stirling	North Beach	4.7	2.9	North Beach Road – Carine, Gwelup, Karrinyup	
Stirling	Trigg	6.2	3.9	Karrinyup Road (State Route 73;Tourist Drive 204) – Karrinyup, Dianella, Morley, Eden Hill	Tourist Drive 204 (Sunset Coast Tourist Drive) southern concurrency terminus. Traffic continuing south to West Coast Highway must turn here.
Stirling	Trigg	6.4	4.0	Trigg Place	
Stirling	Trigg	6.5	4.0	King Albert Road	
Stirling	Trigg	6.9	4.3	South Trigg Beach Access roads	West Coast Drive converts to one-way northbound
Stirling	Trigg	7.0	4.3	West Coast Highway (State Route 71 / Tourist Drive 204)	Southern Terminus. No access from West Coast Drive to West Coast Highway
1.000 mi = 1.609 km; 1.000 km = 0.621 mi: Incomplete access; Route transition; Note: Intersections with minor local roads are not shown
