= Beach Road, Perth =

Road in Perth, Western Australia

Beach Road Western Australia
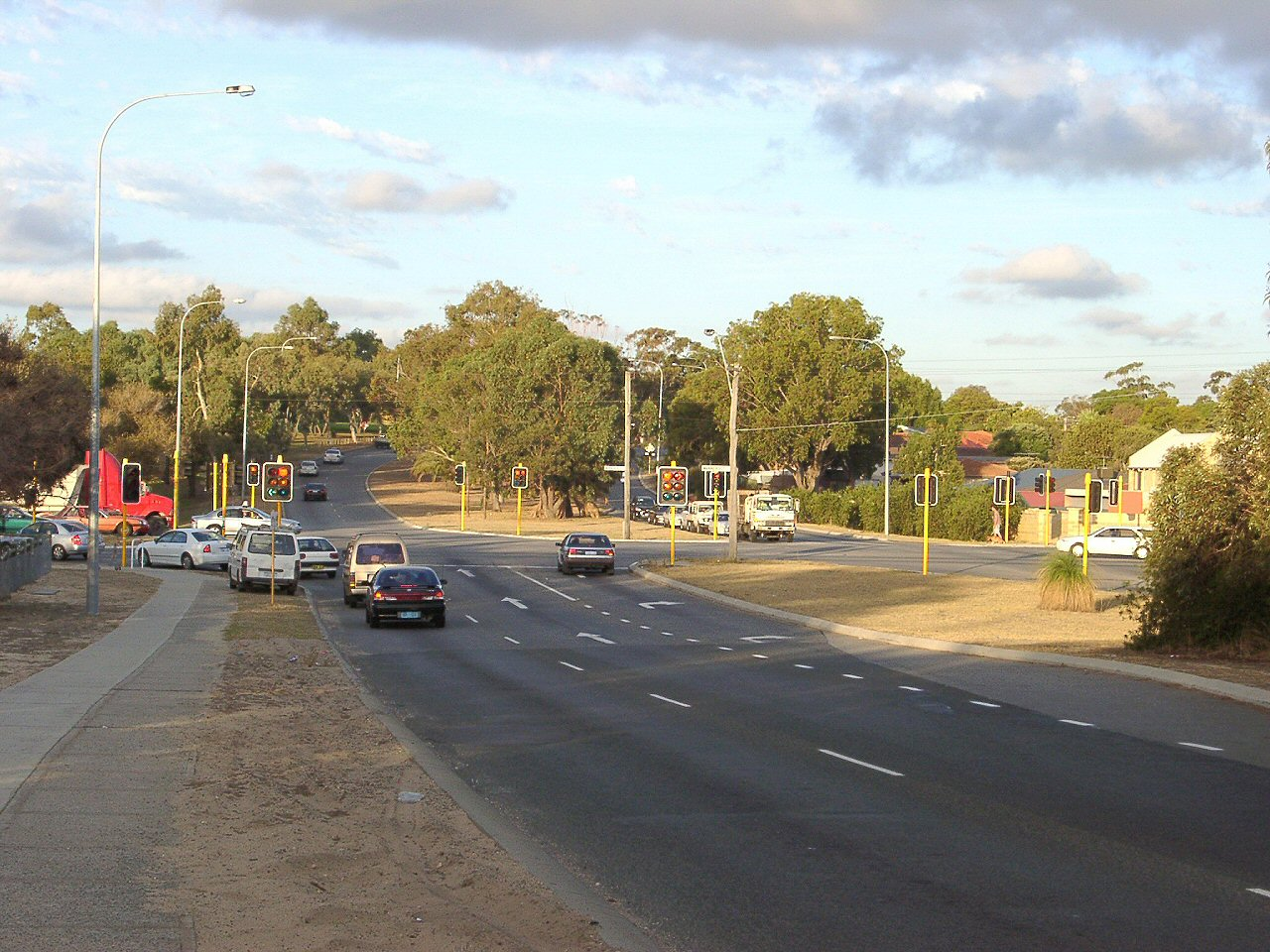
- View east towards intersection with Wanneroo Road

General information
- Type: Road
- Length: 14 km (8.7 mi)
- Opened: 1900

Major junctions
- West end: West Coast Drive (Tourist Drive 204), Marmion
- Marmion Avenue (State Route 71); Erindale Road (State Route 77); Wanneroo Road (State Route 60); Alexander Drive (State Route 56)
- East end: Marshall Road, Malaga

Location(s)
- Major suburbs: Duncraig, Carine, Warwick, Hamersley, Balga, Mirrabooka, Malaga

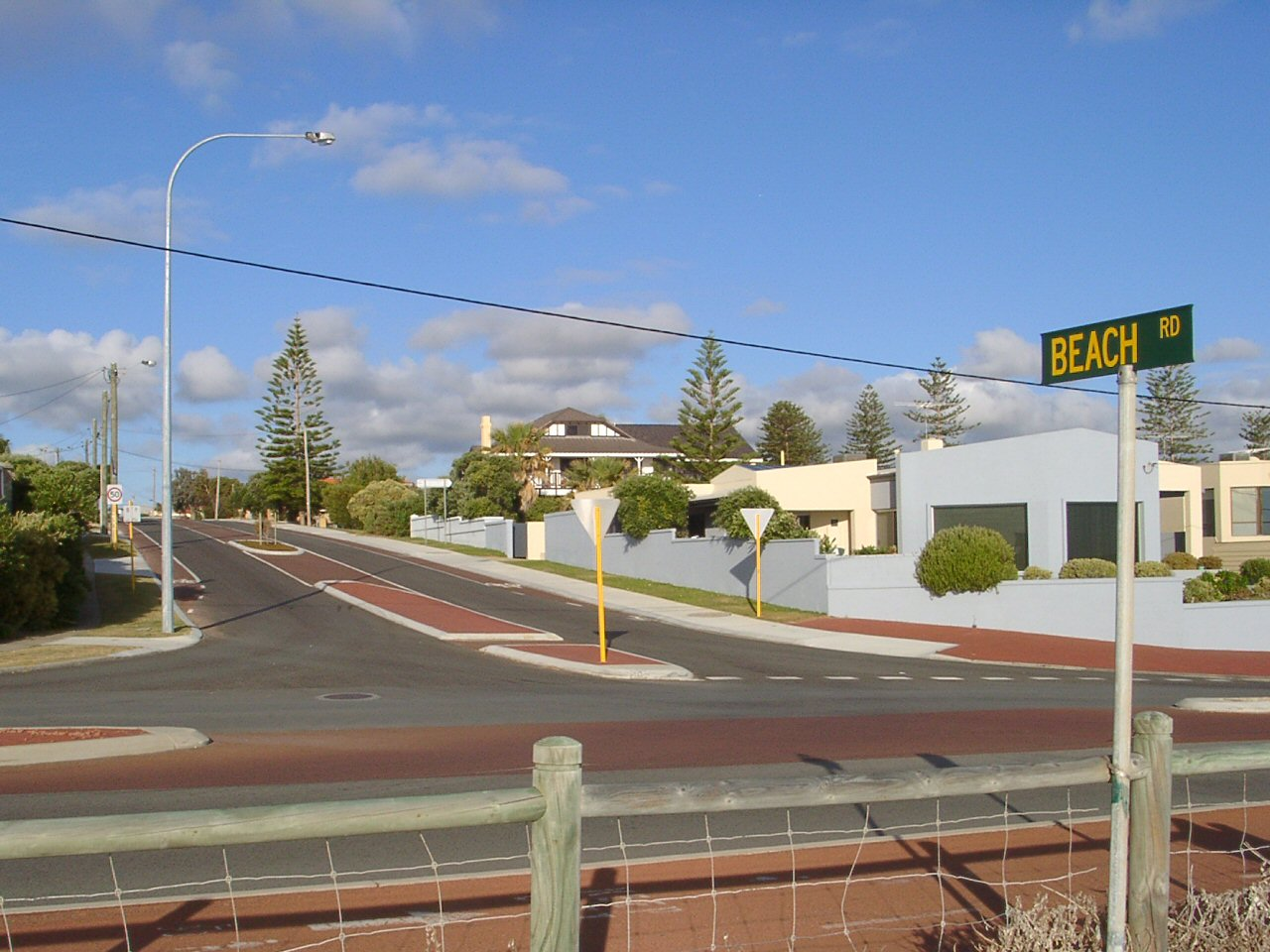
View east from intersection with West Coast Drive

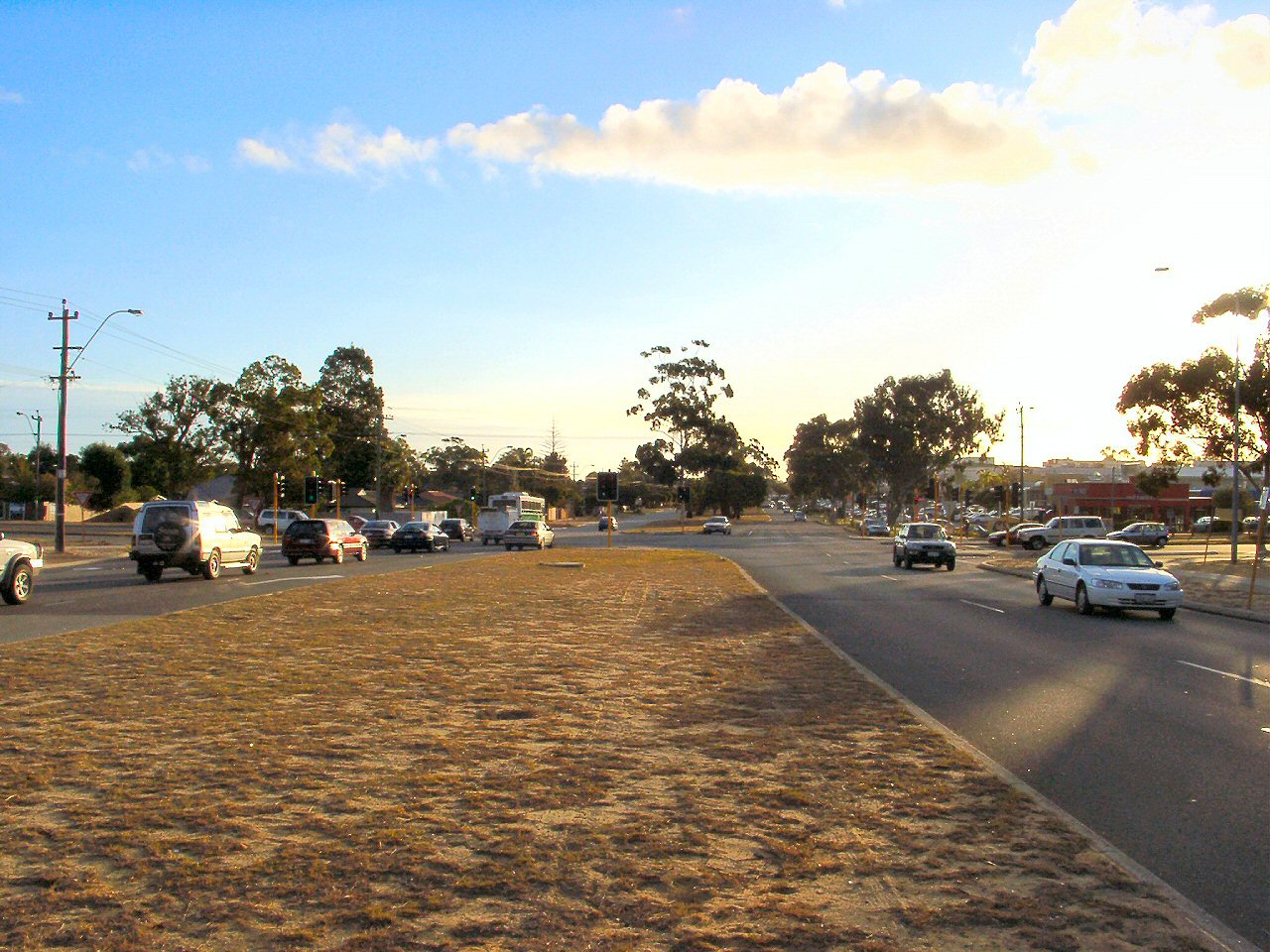
View west towards intersection with Erindale Road

Beach Road is a major east–west road in the northern suburbs of Perth, Western Australia, connecting Perth's inner northern beachside suburbs and inland state housing areas with shopping and public transport facilities at Warwick and the Malaga industrial area. It was mostly built between 1967 and 1974, and is a dual carriageway for most of its length, except for a small western part between Marmion Avenue and the coast, which is a minor residential distributor road and is discontinuous at Marmion Avenue. Beach Road also serves as a local government boundary. From Alexander Drive to Wanneroo Road, Beach Road is the boundary with the City of Wanneroo on the northern side and the City of Stirling on the southern side. From Wanneroo Road to the coast Beach Road is the boundary with the City of Joondalup (part of City of Wanneroo until 1998) on the northern side and the City of Stirling on the southern side.

Beach Road is unusual in two respects: despite its size and traffic levels, and the fact it crosses Mitchell Freeway, it does not have entry or exit to the freeway – one of only two major east-west roads not to do so (along with Scarborough Beach Road) – and secondly, it was not assigned a route number when Main Roads Department introduced the State Route system in 1986.

== History ==
It was surveyed as Road No.246 by A. Crowther in 1900. It included modern-day Sandstone Place in Marmion and Treen Street in Balga, running purely east-west, and formed the boundary between the Wanneroo and Perth Road Districts (now the Cities of Joondalup and Wanneroo, and the City of Stirling). The road serviced a small number of rural grants around Lake Carine as well as the small coastal town of Marmion, which was gazetted in 1940.

By 1968, two different parts of the road were impacted by development. The Hamersley Development Scheme had been approved on both sides of the road between Marmion Avenue and Wanneroo Road, while the State Housing Commission had commenced the Mirrabooka Satellite City development, which consisted mainly of housing construction in the Balga and Girrawheen areas. The Shires of Perth and Wanneroo agreed to build a new road on the present alignment, and closed 95 chains (1.8 km or 1.1 mi) of the old road between what is now Glendale Avenue and Wanneroo Road.

In 1974, the Warwick Grove Shopping Centre was built at the intersection of Erindale Road. A bus transfer station alongside the proposed Mitchell Freeway was constructed in the early 1980s, which was demolished in 1992 to construct Warwick railway station. The construction of the Reid Highway in stages from 1988 to 2001 about 1–2 km (0.62–1.24 mi) further south for Beach Road's entire length provided an alternative for east-west traffic.

== Major intersections ==
All intersections below are controlled by traffic lights unless otherwise indicated.

LGA	Location	km	mi	Destinations	Notes
Swan	Malaga	0.0	0.0	Malaga Drive – Noranda, Bennett Springs, Dayton	Eastern terminus; road continues east as Marshall Road
Swan	Malaga	0.8	0.50	Oxleigh Drive	Roundabout
Swan	Malaga	1.1	0.68	Crocker Drive	Roundabout
Wanneroo–Swan–Stirling tripoint	Koondoola–Malaga–Mirrabooka tripoint	1.6	0.99	Alexander Drive (State Route 56) – Landsdale, Ballajura, Dianella, Perth	
Wanneroo–Stirling boundary	Koondoola–Mirrabooka boundary	2.9	1.8	Butterworth Avenue	
Wanneroo–Stirling boundary	Balga–Mirrabooka–Girrawheen–Koondoola quadripoint	3.8	2.4	Mirrabooka Avenue – Alexander Heights, Darch, Nollamara	
Wanneroo–Stirling boundary	Girrawheen-Balga boundary	5.3	3.3	Girrawheen Avenue north / Princess Road south – Westminster	
Stirling–Joondalup–Wanneroo tripoint	Hamersley –Balga–Warwick–Girrawheen quadripoint	7.0	4.3	Wanneroo Road (State Route 60) – Lancelin, Wanneroo, Yokine, Perth	
Joondalup–Stirling boundary	Warwick-Hamersley boundary	8.0	5.0	Erindale Road – Greenwood, Balcatta, Gwelup	
Joondalup–Stirling boundary	Warwick-Hamersley boundary	8.5	5.3	Dorchester Avenue north / Glendale Avenue south	
Joondalup–Stirling boundary	Warwick-Hamersley boundary	9.4	5.8	Warwick railway station access road	
Joondalup–Stirling boundary	Duncraig-Carine boundary	10.7	6.6	Davallia Road north / Okely Road south	
Joondalup–Stirling boundary	Marmion –Duncraig–Carine–Watermans Bay quadripoint	12.8– 13.0	8.0– 8.1	Marmion Avenue (State Route 71) – Yanchep, Hillarys, Scarborough, Cottesloe	Staggered T-intersections favouring Marmion Avenue. The section from the coast meets at an unsignalised intersection 150 m south of the main signalised intersection.
Joondalup–Stirling boundary	Marmion–Watermans Bay boundary	14.0	8.7	West Coast Drive (Tourist Drive 204) – Sorrento, North Beach, Trigg	Western terminus at unsignalised T-intersection
1.000 mi = 1.609 km; 1.000 km = 0.621 mi Note: Intersections with minor local roads are not shown

Travelling along Beach Road

View westbound from Glendale Avenue

View eastbound from Wanneroo Road
