= Sorrento, Western Australia =

Sorrento
- Suburb
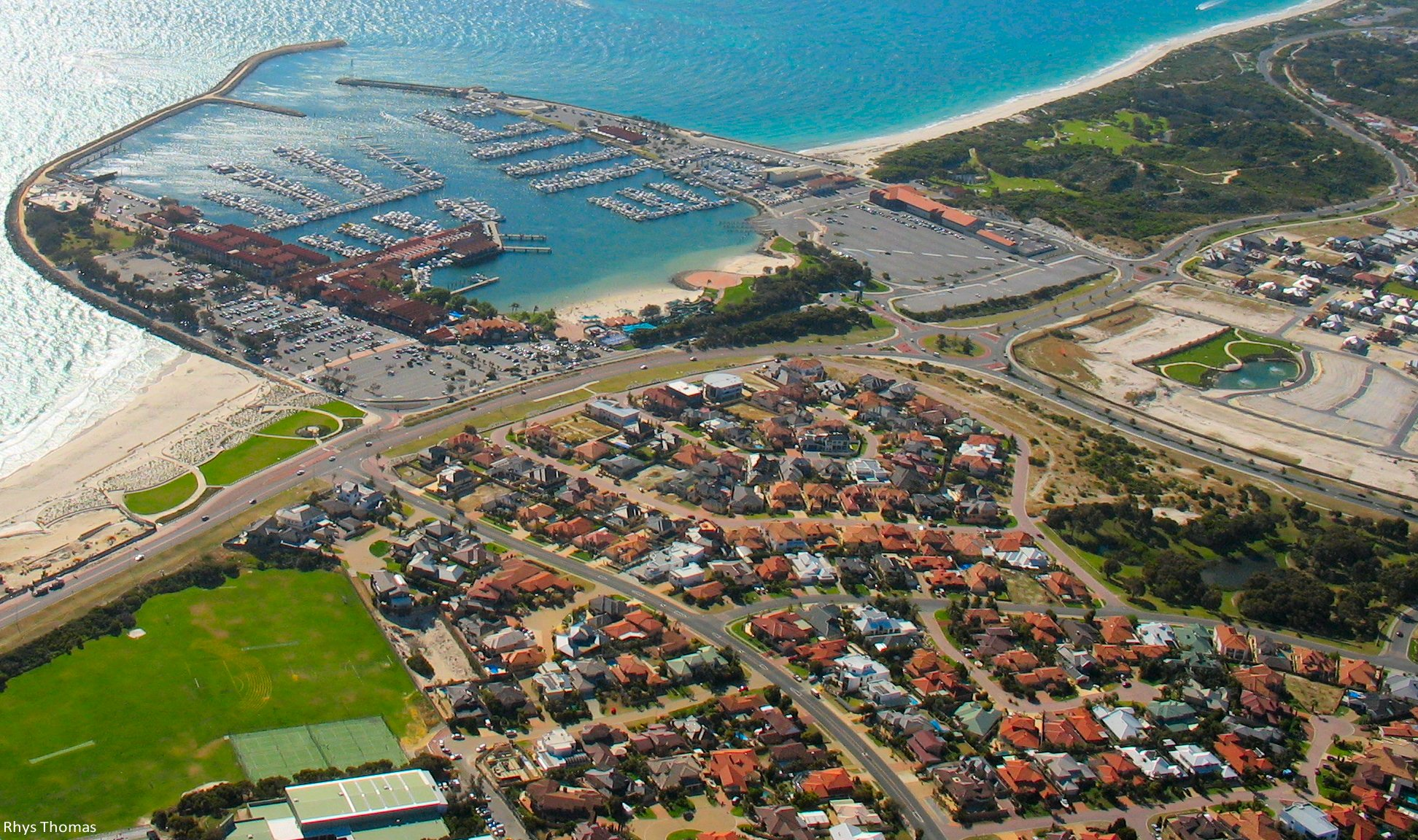
- Sorrento and Hillarys from the air, circa 2009
- Interactive map of Sorrento
- Coordinates: 31.827°S 115.754°E
- Country: Australia
- State: Western Australia
- City: Perth
- LGA: City of Joondalup
- Location: 19 km (12 mi) NW of Perth CBD
- Established: 1971

Government
  - State electorate: Carine
  - Federal division: Moore

Area
  - Total: 3.5 km^{2} (1.4 sq mi)

Population
  - Total: 7,795 (SAL 2021)
- Postcode: 6020
Suburbs around Sorrento
	Hillarys	Padbury
Indian Ocean	Sorrento	Duncraig
	Marmion	Duncraig

Sorrento is a northern coastal suburb of Perth, the capital city of Western Australia in the local government area of the City of Joondalup. At its northwestern corner is the Hillarys Boat Harbour, built in the late 1980s.

== History ==
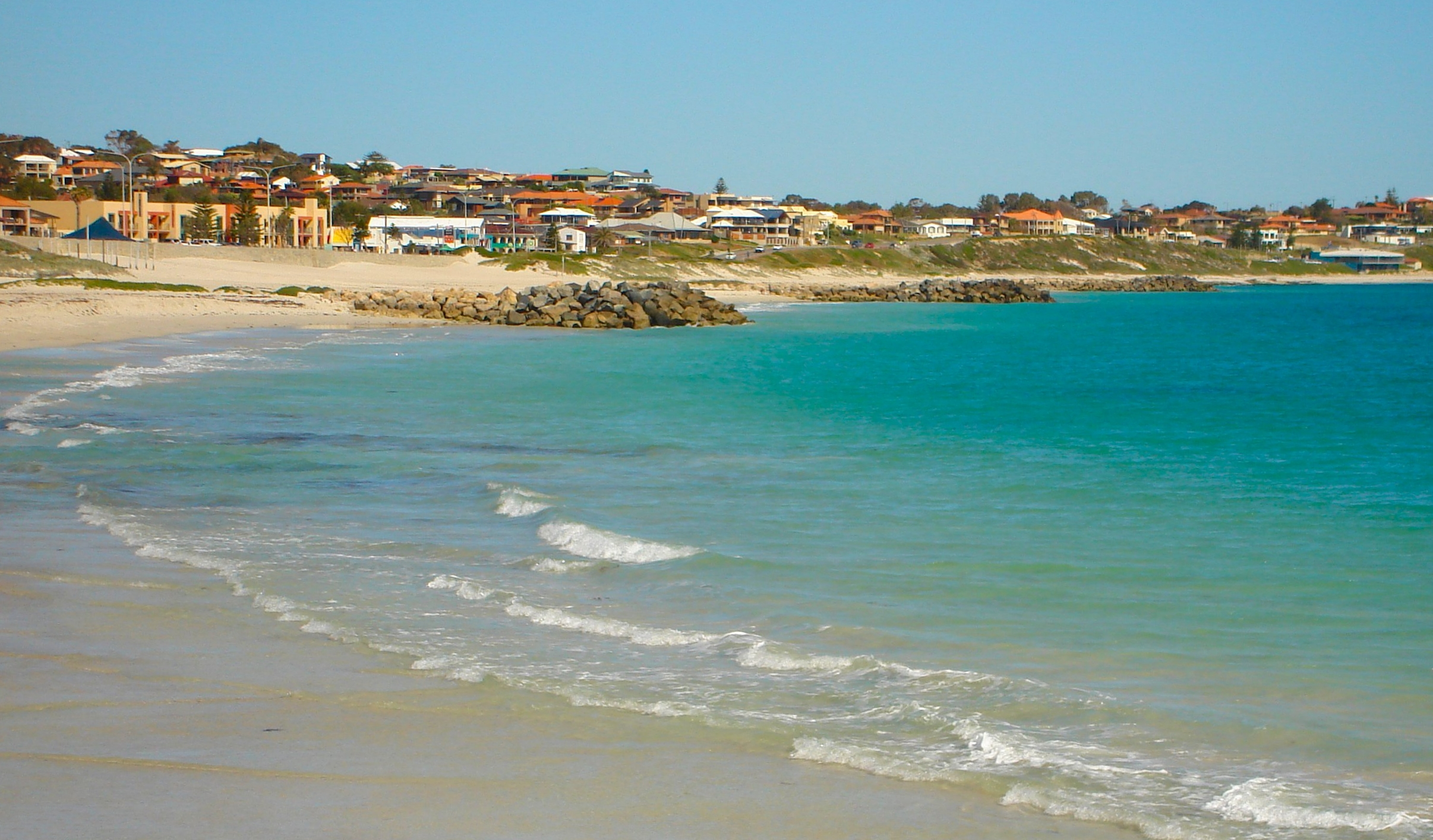
Sorrento Beach

A private subdivision of freehold land known as "Sorrento" was surveyed here in 1929. It is assumed that the name was taken from the Italian seaside town of Sorrento which is located south of Naples opposite the Isle of Capri. Prior to white settlement, the Whadjuk Aboriginal people, who called the area Mooro, gathered abalone and other shellfish in large numbers off the nearby reefs.

The first European to settle in the area was Patrick Marmion, master whaler, who operated a whaling station in the area in 1849. There are still some remains of the old whaling station at the present-day Surf Lifesaving Club site, and a monument to Marmion can be found in Geneff Park in Padbury Circle.

The area was popular with fishermen in the 1930s, and numerous boatsheds and shacks were built there. Residential settlement commenced in the early 1950s and until 1981, it was part of the suburb of Marmion.

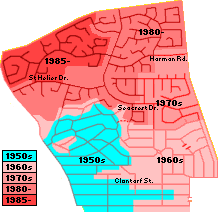
Sorrento's development (1950–1990)

In 1958, the Sisters of Our Lady of the Missions bought land in Sorrento at what was then the end of the West Coast Highway, and in 1967, the Sisters and boarding students moved from Highgate to the new site, Sacred Heart College Sorrento. The college became coeducational in 1977, and in 1989, the Catholic Education Commission took over management of the school.

In preparation for Australia's defence of the 1987 America's Cup at Fremantle, the State Government commissioned the building of Hillarys Boat Harbour, the first major marina in the north metropolitan area. The retail complex on the site, called Sorrento Quay, commenced trading in December 1987 and was officially opened in January 1988. Also, in May 1987, the Government declared Marmion Marine Park over a region from Burns Beach to Trigg, to which the new marina complex provided a gateway.

== Geography ==
Sorrento is bounded by Hepburn Avenue to the north, Marmion Avenue to the east, Marine Terrace to the south and West Coast Drive and the Indian Ocean to the west.

At the 2021 Australian Census, Sorrento had a population of 7,795 people living in 2,944 dwellings. Sorrento's oceanside location and to Hillarys Boat Harbour has seen the suburb become affluent since the 1980s, and the ABS identified many managers and professionals living within the suburb. However, many tradespeople and service employees also live in the area.

== Facilities ==
Sorrento is a residential suburb, relying on the Seacrest Village shopping centre for liquor, take-away food, the Seacrest pharmacy for medical goods, and Whitford City and Centro Warwick for other services. Several parks of various sizes are situated in the suburb.

The Sorrento Quay retail development within the Hillarys Boat Harbour sits on the northwestern boundary of the suburb. Off the coast is the Marmion Marine Park, which provides a home for many species of marine animals.

Sorrento Beach has a shark siren alert system meaning if a shark is in near by waters a siren goes off. Sorrento Beach also has a Surf Life Saving Club, providing patrols, education training and sporting facilities.

There are many parks situated in Sorrento. Seacrest Park is the largest park in Sorrento with two AFL size ovals used in winter for the Sorrento Duncraig Football Club and in summer the Sorrento Cricket Club, half a soccer pitch, a basketball ring, cricket nets, large children play area, change rooms/community hall and public toilets. Other parks in Sorrento include Robin Reserve (oval), Albacore Park, Lacepede Park and pond, Harman Park (bushland), Geneff Park, Tom Walker Park and Porteous Park (bushland).

Although being in Duncraig on the suburb border of Sorrento, Percy Doyle Reserve is home to many Sorrento sport clubs.

== Education ==
Sorrento contains a Catholic private school, Sacred Heart College, and a state primary school Sorrento Primary School (founded 1970). The suburb falls within Duncraig Senior High School's catchment area.

== Transport ==
Sorrento is served by the 441 and 442 buses from Warwick Train Station and Whitfords Train Station, as well as the 423 bus from Warwick Train Station and Stirling Train Station operated by Swan Transit.

=== Bus ===
- 441 to Warwick Station
- 441 to Whitford Station
- 442 to Whitford Station*
- 443 to Warwick Station
- 443 to Stirling Station
- 444 to Whitford Station*
- 783 to Warwick Station*

*school special, departing Sacred Heart College

== Sport ==
Sorrento has a rich sporting culture, with 8 local sport clubs calling the suburb home. Below is a table summarising these sport clubs:

Club	Moniker	Sport	Location	Est	Major Leagues
Sorrento Football Club	Gulls	Soccer	Percy Doyle Reserve	1972	National Premier League WA
Sorrento Tennis Club	Planets*	Tennis	Percy Doyle Reserve	1973	Men's State League (MSL)
Sorrento Duncraig Junior Football Club	Hawks	Australian Football	Seacrest Park	1971	
Sorrento Duncraig Cricket Club	Vikings	Cricket	Seacrest Park	1999	
Sorrento Duncraig Junior Cricket Club	Kookaburras	Cricket	Seacrest Park	1976	
Sorrento Surf Life Saving Club	N/A	Surf Life Saving	Sorrento Beach	1958	
Sorrento Netball Club	Saints	Netball	Kingsway Sport Complex	1993	
Sorrento Bowling Club	Swans	Lawn Bowls	Percy Doyle Reserve	1976	

* Sorrento Tennis Club's Men's State League team is joined with the Mt Lawley Tennis Club. They are known as the Mt Lawley/Sorrento Planets. They play half their home games at Sorrento Tennis Club and the other half at the Mt Lawley Tennis Centre. Men's State League is the highest semi-professional tennis league in Western Australia. The Planets were established before the 2023/24 season. The club itself does not go off the branded name 'Planets', only the state league team.

== Politics ==
Sorrento is a reasonably affluent suburb with many "mortgage belt" families. The beachside part of Sorrento, together with Hillarys to its north, is the strongest base in the northern suburban region for the Liberal Party at both federal and state elections.

== See also ==
- Hillarys Boat Harbour
- Percy Doyle Reserve
