= Carine Senior High School =

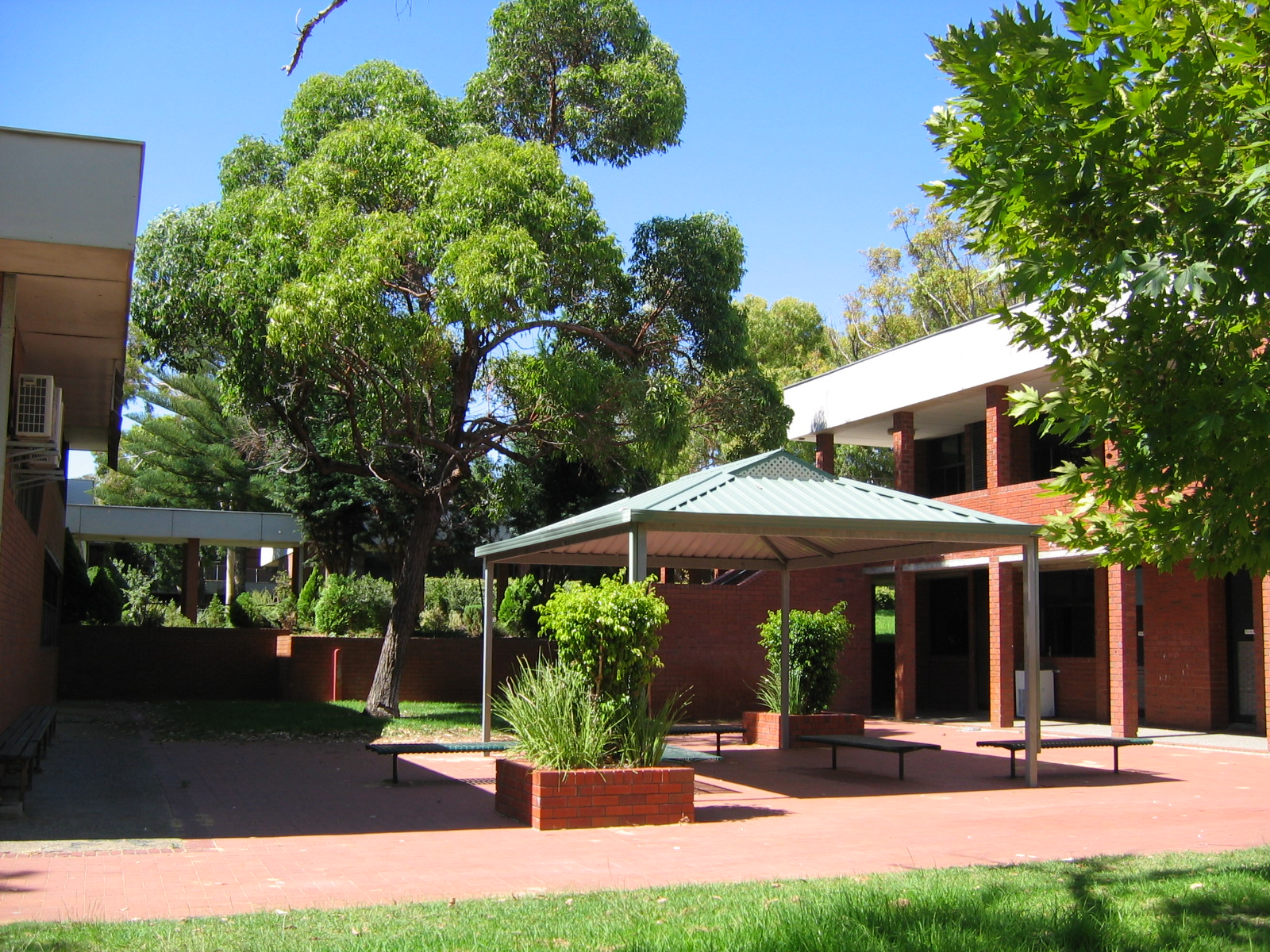
- An internal view of Carine Senior High School, in 2007

Location
- Carine, Perth, Western Australia; Australia; 31°51′7″S 115°46′33″E

Information
- Type: Public co-educational high school
- Motto: Service
- Established: 1973; 53 years ago
- Educational authority: WA Department of Education
- Principal: Damian Shuttleworth
- Years: 7–12
- Enrolment: 2,545 (2026)
- Campus type: Suburban
- Houses: Emerald; Silica; Topaz; Zircon
- Colours: Blue, red and white
- Mascot: "Kwilena The Dolphin"
- Website: www.carinehs.wa.edu.au

Carine Senior High School is a public co-educational high school, located in the suburb of Carine, approximately 15 kilometres (9.3 mi) north-west of Perth, Western Australia.

== History ==
Carine Senior High School was established in 1973 and reached senior high school status three years later. It caters for around 2,000 students from Years 7 to 12, and offers a range of tertiary, non-tertiary and vocational education and training (VET) subjects in Years 11 and 12.

In 2017 Carine Senior High School was awarded WA Secondary School of the Year.

== House system ==
In 2017 Carine SHS reinstated a house system with the following colours:

House
Emerald
Silica
Topaz
Zircon

== Catchment area ==
The Carine Senior High School catchment area consists of students living in Carine, Stirling, Waterman's Bay, North Beach, Karrinyup, Gwelup, Trigg, Marmion, parts of Duncraig (south of Warwick Road) and small areas of Sorrento, Innaloo, Doubleview, Scarborough and Balcatta.

The primary schools within the catchment area are Carine Primary School, Davallia Primary School, Poynter Primary School, Marmion Primary School, North Beach Primary School, Karrinyup Primary School, Lake Gwelup Primary School, Deanmore Primary School and Newborough Primary School.

== Incidents ==
On 7 December 2023, a 16-year-old male student was stabbed by a 15-year-old female student before turning the knife on herself. The boy was stabbed at least twice in the back. Police stated that “Both students are with police and currently receiving medical treatment in hospital" and that “There is no threat to the school or the wider community, the situation is contained.”

== Notable alumni ==
- Darren Glass – West Coast Eagles footballer
- Jamie Harnwell – Perth Glory FC captain
- Lisa McCune – Gold Logie-winning actress
- Guy McKenna — West Coast Eagles footballer
- Mark Nicoski – West Coast Eagles footballer
- Jo Beth Taylor – former TV actor starring in multiple shows
- Mitchell White – West Coast Eagles footballer

== See also ==
- List of schools in the Perth metropolitan area
