= Watermans Bay, Western Australia =

Watermans Bay Perth, Western Australia
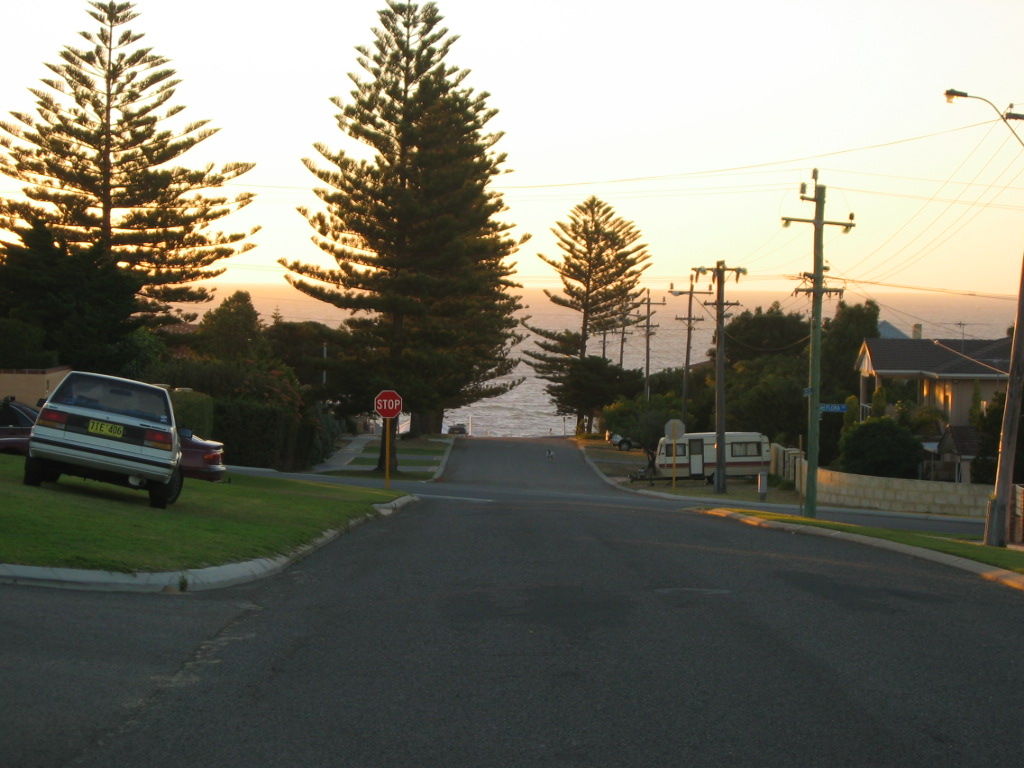
- View towards the ocean at sunset from Watermans Bay
- Coordinates: 31.851°S 115.758°E
- Population: 1,369 (SAL 2021)
- Established: 1918
- Postcode(s): 6020
- Area: 1.7 km^{2} (0.7 sq mi)
- Location: 18 km (11 mi) NW of Perth
- LGA(s): City of Stirling
- State electorate(s): Carine
- Federal division(s): Moore
Suburbs around Watermans Bay:
	Marmion	Duncraig
Indian Ocean	Watermans Bay	Carine
	North Beach	Karrinyup

Watermans Bay is a northern coastal suburb of Perth, the capital city of Western Australia. Its local government area is the City of Stirling.

== History ==
The area originally formed part of the Hamersley Estate, which also included the suburbs now known as Carine, North Beach and modern-day Hamersley. These areas were owned by the Hamersley family, who arrived from Europe to settle in the Swan River Colony in 1837. The Hamersleys built a summer home just south of Waterman called "The Castle" in 1865, where their large family, as well as the Perth elite, congregated for summer holidays. Many of the street names in the suburb honour members of the Hamersley family, including Ethel, Margaret, Mary, Ada and Elsie.

Originally set aside as a timber reserve, the area was first settled by pastoralists in the 1860s. It served as a stopping point and watering hole along the Coastal Stock Route between Dongara and Fremantle. Cattle drovers frequented the area and Afghan camel drivers were a common sight after the opening of the goldfields in the 1890s.

In 1908, the first house in modern-day Watermans Bay was built by a business man cum recreational fisherman, Alfred Waterman, who named his house "Zephyr". The beach front adjacent to his house became known as Watermans Bay, which became a popular fishing spot. The only way into the area at this time was via a wooden block road built by convicts (later Wanneroo Road) and then along a limestone track to North Beach, although numerous tracks through the bushland were developed as time progressed.

In 1918, the area was subdivided as the Mt Flora Estates, but initial development was largely limited to holiday shacks. After World War II, the area developed rapidly, and in 1954, the postal district of Watermans Bay was approved. By 1961, nearly all of the existing suburb had been built and settled.

=== Name controversy ===
In 1962, the name Watermans Bay was shortened to Waterman because it did not comply with WA state government regulations at the time – it was not, strictly speaking, a bay. This move was unpopular with local residents, who lobbied to revert the name. In November 2003, the Geographic Names Committee accepted a City of Stirling proposal to return to the original name following a survey of Waterman households, 491 of whom supported the proposal and 11 of whom opposed it. It is in fact a "bay", divided by onshore cliffs and offshore reefs to north and south with a wide sandy beach, and a place to launch fishing boats.

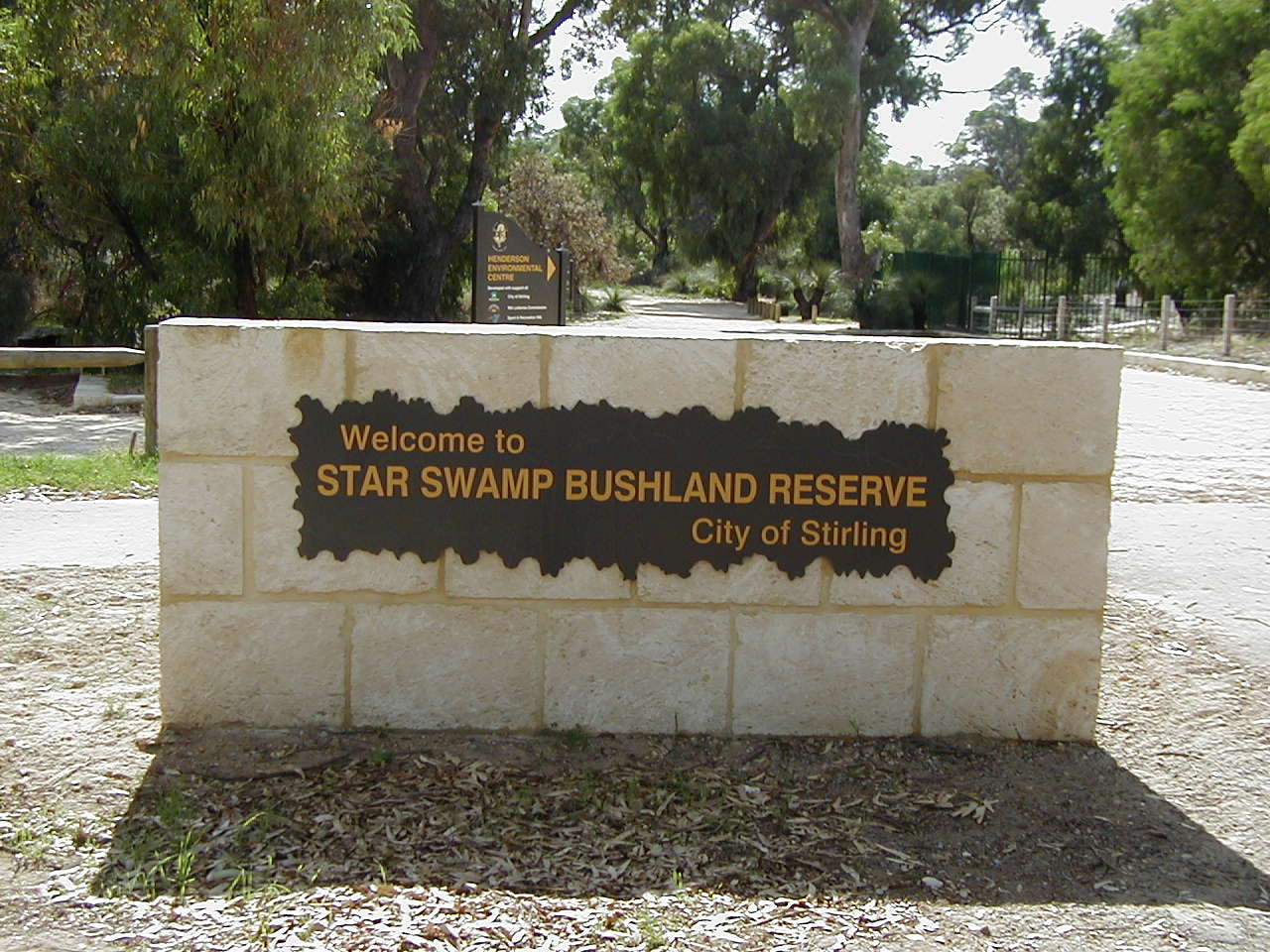
Star Swamp Bushland Reserve

=== Star Swamp ===
Star Swamp Bushland Reserve is a bushland reserve occupying about half of the land area of the suburbs of Watermans Bay and North Beach. The precise origin of the name is unknown, but the earliest known use of the name was on a lease application by J.H.Okely of Wanneroo in 1868. It also has a long history as a Noongar camping area, with fresh water and abundant bush tucker and seafood. Some signs of the people are still there. In 1987, the State Government set aside 96 hectares as an A-class reserve, and funding from the Bicentennial Commemorative Program and assistance from local organisations facilitated the establishment of the Star Swamp Heritage Trail within the reserve.

== Geography ==
Watermans Bay is bounded by the Beach Road coastal segment to the north, Marmion Avenue to the east, Hale Street to the south and West Coast Drive and the ocean to the west. Star Swamp sits east of Hope Street and represents just over half of the suburb. Reid Highway ends at the southeastern corner, and is the suburb's outlet to the Mitchell Freeway and the Perth central business district.

At the 2006 Australian census, Waterman had a population of 1,195 people living in 494 dwellings, with an average age of 45 years (the third-oldest in the northern suburbs). Residential styles in Watermans Bay range from timber and fibro workers' homes to modern two storey dwellings constructed of brick. Due to its small size and surroundings, it is one of the most expensive of the northern suburbs in Perth.

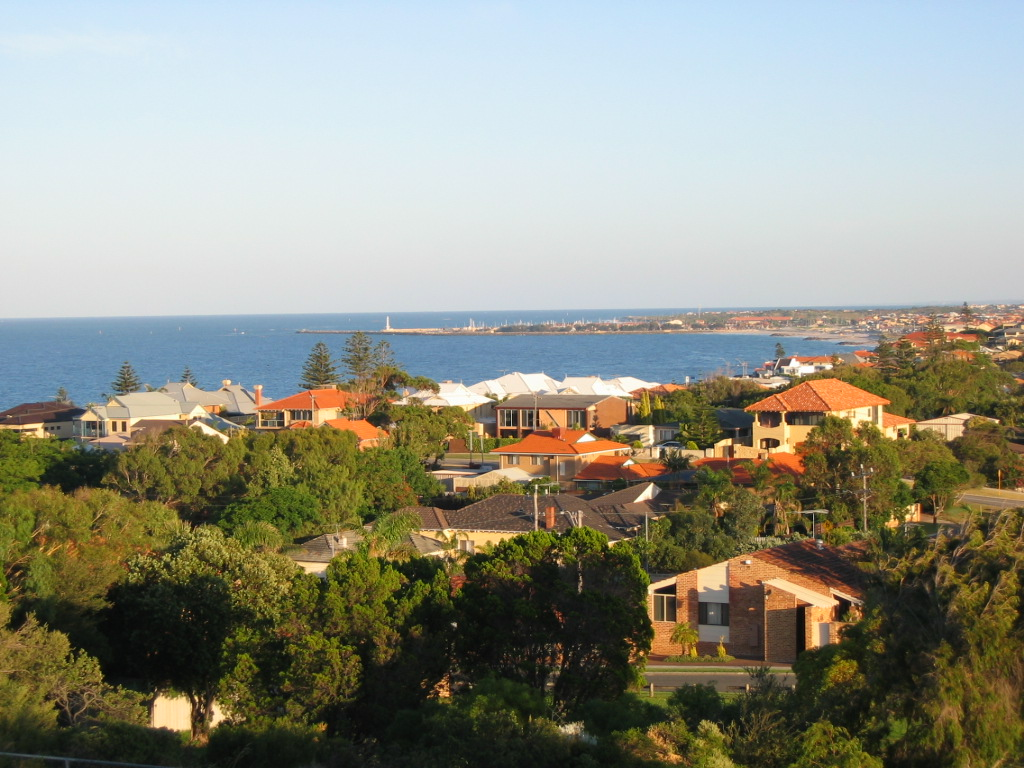
View over Waterman from Mount Flora Lookout

== Facilities ==
Watermans Bay is a residential suburb, relying on North Beach Shopping Centre which includes a gym, a cafe, a Farmer Jacks, a liquor shop and many other stores, situated on West Coast Drive. There are also nearby shops in Marmion, North Beach and Duncraig for basic commercial services, and nearby Karrinyup Shopping Centre for other services. The suburb contains no schools, but Marmion Primary School is just beyond its northern boundary and North Beach Primary school just beyond its southern border.

Star Swamp Bushland Reserve is accessible from the eastern edge of the suburb. The WA Marine Research Laboratories are located on the beach off Elvire Street, and until recently were the headquarters of the Research Division of the WA Department of Fisheries, which moved to Hillarys in June 2005. The site has since become the home of the department's International Operations Branch.

On the southern boundary, on Elvire Street, is the Mount Flora Regional Museum, built in 1936 as a water tower at the highest point of the suburb to provide scheme water to surrounding areas. It was phased out of service in the 1970s, and converted to a museum and lookout in May 1986. It now details the region's history, and is home to the North Suburban Historical Society.

== Transport ==
Watermans Bay is served by the 423 bus between Warwick and Stirling train stations, operated by Swan Transit.

=== Bus ===
- 423 Stirling Station to Warwick Station – serves Flora Terrace and Beach Road

== Politics ==
Watermans Bay is a reasonably affluent suburb with a large elderly population. It consistently supports the Liberal Party at both federal and state elections.

2004 federal election Source: AEC
Liberal	61.0%
Labor	27.2%
Greens	7.47%
CDP	1.93%
One Nation	0.96%

2005 state election Source: WAEC
Labor	52.1%
Liberal	32.0%
Greens	12.4%
CDP	3.5%

2001 federal election Source: AEC
Liberal	59.7%
Labor	25.7%
Greens	9.17%
Democrats	2.46%
One Nation	1.79%

2001 state election Source: WAEC
Liberal	41.8%
Labor	26.4%
Independent	13.4%
Greens	8.12%
One Nation	4.97%

1998 federal election Source: AEC
Liberal	54.8%
Labor	30.0%
One Nation	4.85%
Greens	4.85%
Democrats	4.73%

1996 state election Source: WAEC
Liberal	43.4%
Independent	25.8%
Labor	20.3%
Independent	6.37%
Greens	4.00%
