= Hamersley Development Scheme =

Scheme in Perth, Western Australia

The Hamersley Development Scheme was conceived in 1967 and built over the ensuing years as part of a major effort by the Government of Western Australia to force down the price of land elsewhere in the Perth metropolitan area by opening up and developing land for housing as quickly as possible. This was a response to upward pressures on land prices across the metropolitan area, including demand created by the growth of the Kwinana industrial district south of Perth and the establishment of the iron ore industry in northern Western Australia. By 1968 land speculation had also become a significant factor, with individuals and companies profiting by buying and selling released but undeveloped land.

The scheme area was a region of 24 km^{2} bounded by Hepburn Avenue, Marmion Avenue, North Perimeter Highway and Wanneroo Road, and consisted of the suburbs of Hamersley and Carine within the City of Stirling, and Warwick, Greenwood and Duncraig within the City of Joondalup.

== History ==
In the late 1960s, concern about the growth of land prices in the Perth metropolitan area, which for several years had exceeded the consumer price index, led to the Premier of Western Australia, David Brand, convening an inter-departmental committee to study the problem. One of the committee's recommendations to Cabinet was to release 300 hectares of land owned by the State Housing Commission in Hamersley, Warwick and Greenwood which was designated as "deferred urban" land under the Metropolitan Scheme which had been drafted in 1963. On 13 December 1967, the Metropolitan Region Planning Authority decided to rezone as urban all land bounded by Hepburn Avenue, Marmion Avenue, North Perimeter Highway and Wanneroo Road, on the condition that subdivision would be approved when "Town Planning (Development) Scheme(s) have been approved with the general object of serving the best possible development at the least cost to the community".

The Shires of Perth and Wanneroo combined to prepare Town Planning Scheme No.26 (Hamersley Development Scheme), and by early March 1968, the scheme, which included provisions for water supply, sewerage, drainage, road construction and undergrounding of power mains, was presented to both councils for consideration. By July, however, negotiations between the councils broke down, and the Shire of Perth (now City of Stirling) decided to administer its own part of the scheme independently.

In April, the R&I Bank, a government-owned bank, was granted permission to subdivide a small area in northern Ardleigh Crescent. The first auction of 80 lots on Saturday 14 December 1968 was anticipated on the front page of The West Australian, with Premier Brand advising intending buyers to be cautious about their bids. At the auction, 76 lots were sold at an average price of $4,784, compared to $6,700 at a recent R&I Bank sale in the nearby suburb of Karrinyup, with newspapers agreeing that the Premier's warning had been heeded by bidders.
