= Hillarys, Western Australia =

Hillarys
- Suburb
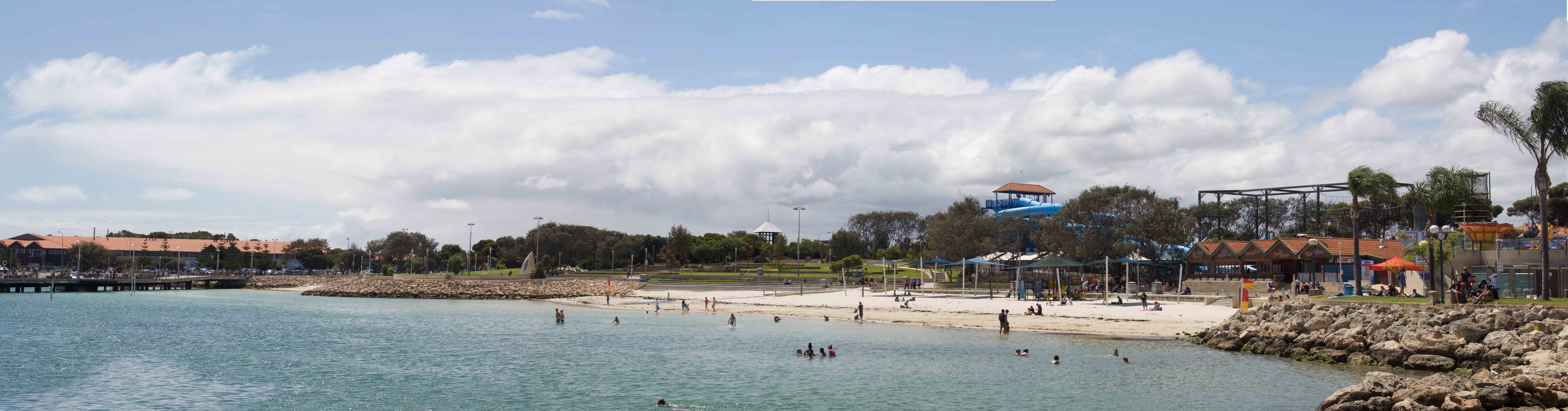
- Interactive map of Hillarys
- Coordinates: 31.807°S 115.744°E
- Country: Australia
- State: Western Australia
- City: Perth
- LGA: City of Joondalup
- Location: 21 km (13 mi) from Perth City
- Established: 1970s.

Government
  - State electorate: Hillarys
  - Federal division: Moore

Area
  - Total: 6.3 km^{2} (2.4 sq mi)

Population
  - Total: 11,200 (SAL 2021)
- Postcode: 6025
Suburbs around Hillarys
	Kallaroo	Craigie
Indian Ocean	Hillarys	Padbury
	Sorrento	Duncraig

Hillarys is a northern coastal suburb of Perth, the capital city of Western Australia, in the local government area of the City of Joondalup. It is part of the Whitfords precinct, and is located 21 km north-northwest of Perth's central business district via Mitchell Freeway and Hepburn Avenue.

== History ==
Hillarys was named after an early settler, Bertram John Hillary (1895-1957), who had become blind in his right eye while fighting in Gallipoli during the First World War. He came to the area during the Great Depression while fishing for a living with his brother Harry, and built a boatshed on the beach in 1930. Subsequently, he expanded it to accommodate himself, his wife and four children. For many years, they were the only residents of what is now Hillarys, and the nearest store, at North Beach to the south, was a 5 km walk away. During the Second World War, the Australian Army used the area, and named it "Hillary's Beach" on their maps. Bert Hillary died in 1957 and the shack and 14 others nearby were destroyed in a fierce storm in 1964.

The Metropolitan Region Scheme, designed in 1955, had proposed that Whitford Beach, just beyond modern Hillarys's north, would be the limit of coastal settlement, and in 1962, a highway from Fremantle to Sorrento was suggested by the Government. In 1967, a road to Whitford Beach was built after a major Catholic school, Sacred Heart College, relocated from inner-suburban Highgate into the region.

Wanneroo Shire Council and the R&I Bank began developing the Whitford precinct and planned a town centre, which ultimately became Westfield Whitford City, in the suburb's northeast, and Marmion Avenue was built. They asked for the Government to gazette a suburb here and this was done in 1971. Many streets in the new development (including the facing portion of what was to become Padbury were named for early explorers and pioneers of Australia. On 21 November 1978, Whitford City Shopping Centre was officially opened.

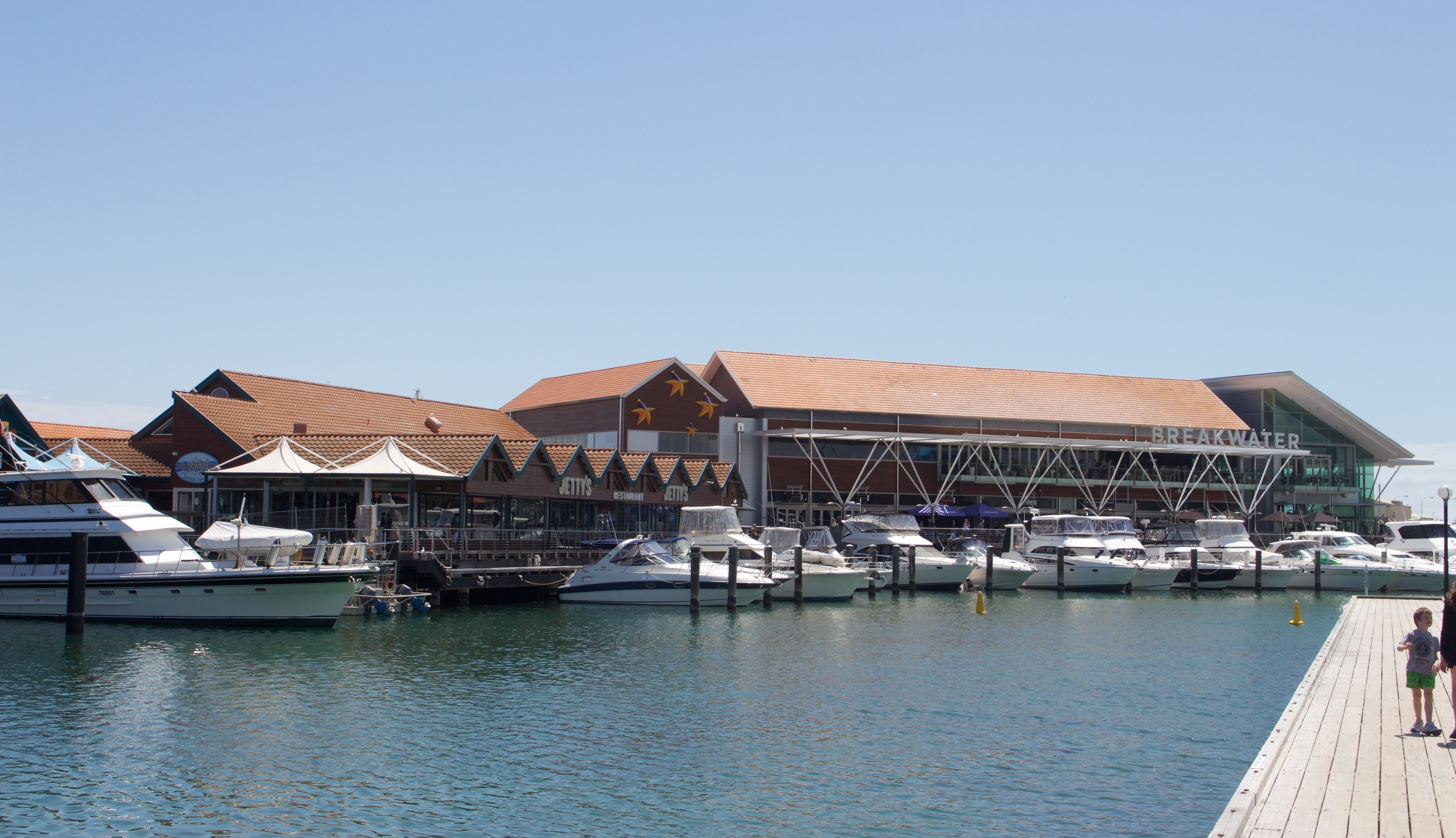
Restaurants and promenade at Hillarys

In preparation for Australia's defence of the 1987 America's Cup at Fremantle, the State Government commissioned the building of Hillarys Boat Harbour, the first major marina in the north metropolitan area. The retail complex on the site, called Sorrento Quay, commenced trading in December 1987 and was officially opened in January 1988. Also, in May 1987, the Government declared Marmion Marine Park over a region from Burns Beach to Trigg, to which the new marina complex provided a gateway.

The shopping centre and marina development fuelled growth in the suburb and by the mid-1990s, both the northwest and southwest of the suburb had been fully developed.

== Geography ==
Hillarys is bounded by Hepburn Avenue to the south, Marmion Avenue to the east, Whitfords Avenue to the north and the coastal road portion of Whitfords Avenue (formerly part of West Coast Highway) to the west.

At the 2001 Australian census, Hillarys had a mostly above-average-income population of 10,159. Hillarys's oceanside location, proximity to three private schools and to Hillarys Boat Harbour has seen the suburb become affluent since the 1980s, and the ABS identified many managers and professionals living within the suburb. However, many tradespeople and service employees also live in the area.

== Facilities ==
Hillarys is mostly a residential suburb, and relies on Westfield Whitford City, a large shopping centre in its northeast, and the smaller Hillarys Shopping Centre (2003) on Flinders Avenue for commercial services. St. Mark's Anglican Community School is a K-12, co-educational private school located to the West of Westfield Whitford City, on the former Red Cattle Ridge site. Several parks and walkways of various sizes are situated in the suburb, and there are picnic facilities in a coastal park just north of Hillarys Boat Harbour. Unlike beaches further to the south, though, the beach at Hillarys is relatively difficult to access due to large sand dunes and remnant vegetation, and Whitford Beach to the north and Sorrento Beach to the south provide access. Off the coast is the Marmion Marine Park, which provides a home for many species of marine animals.

=== Tourism ===
Hillarys Boat Harbour, a large marina development which contains the Sorrento Quay retail development, was built in 1987 and includes the Aquarium of Western Australia (formerly Underwater World) and numerous shops and eating spots, as well as helicopter flights and a ferry terminal offering whale watching cruises during key breeding months, and ferry services to Rottnest Island.

== Economy ==
There is a hatchery serving the aquaculture industry of marine shellfish in Hillarys. In 2020, spat of the black-lip rock oyster was grown in the hatchery and relocated to one of the trial sites on the coast off Karratha and Derby, at specially selected sites at Cossack and West Lewis Island. This was the first time that the oysters had been commercially grown in WA, in an industry which is expected to grow and provide an economic boost and employment opportunities for Indigenous people in the Pilbara region.

== Education ==
Hillarys is served by the Hillarys Primary School, founded in 1973 and formerly known as Lymburner, and an Anglican college, St Mark's Anglican Community School, a coeducational day school built in 1986 on an 11-hectare (27-acre) site. The suburb falls within the Duncraig Senior High School catchment area.

== Photos ==
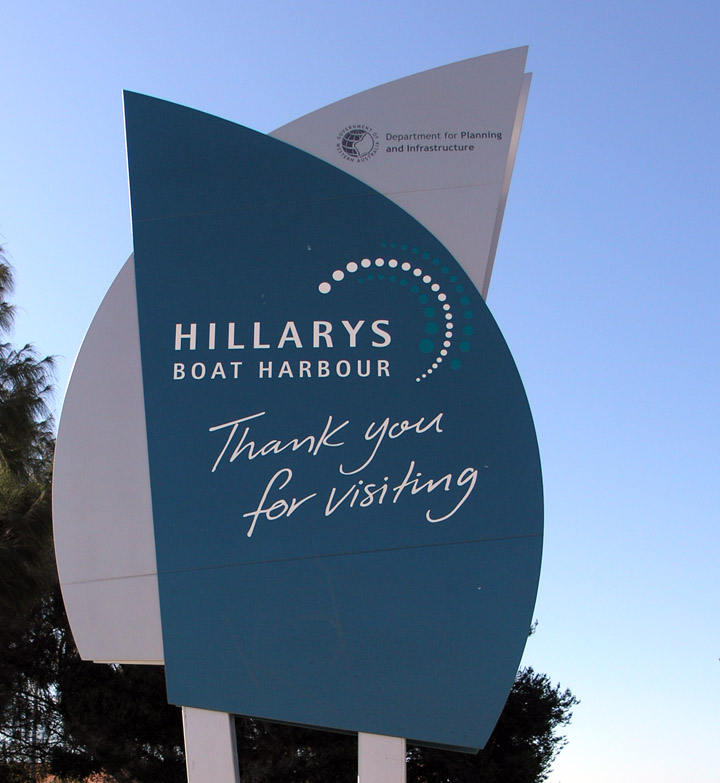
Sign at Hillarys

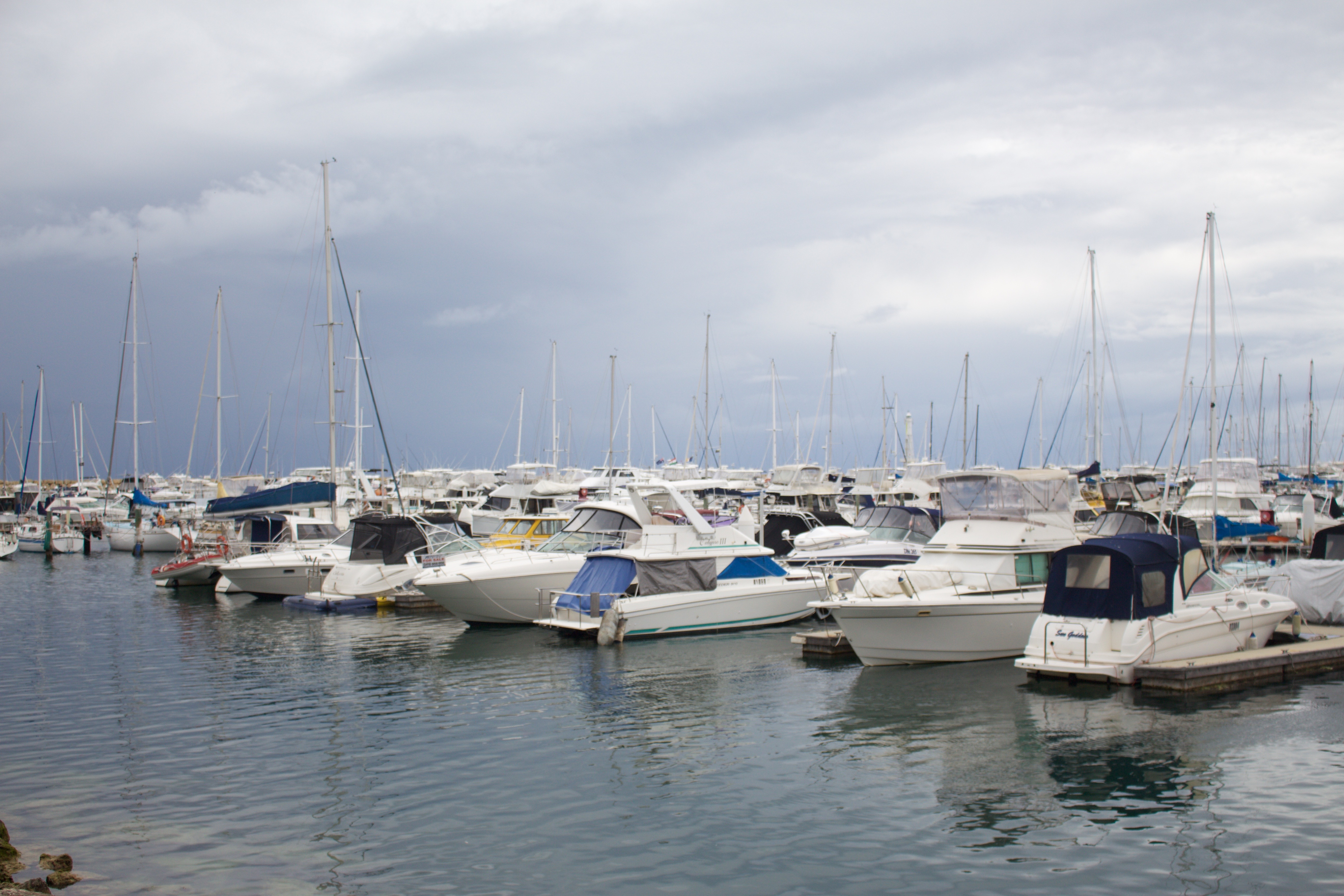
Boat pens

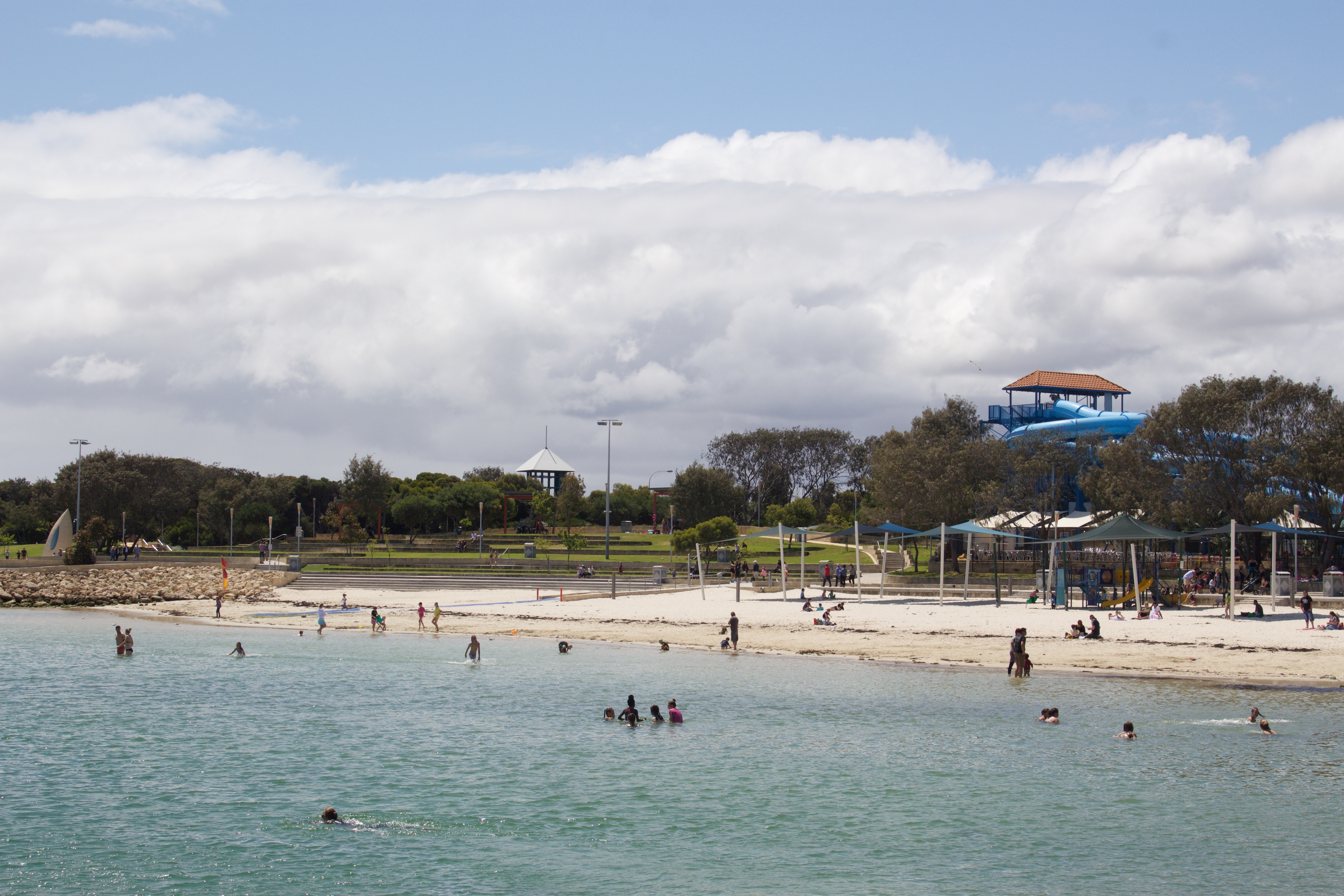
Beach

== Transport ==
Hillarys is served by multiple different transport options. Transperth operate buses that traverse and run adjacent to the suburb connecting Whitfords, Warwick and Joondalup railway stations. Routes 441 and 442 runs through the suburb along Cook Ave and Waterford Dr respectively. Routes 460, 461 and 462 run adjacent to the suburb along Whitfords Ave before spurring off into the neighbouring suburb of Kallaroo.

The suburb is serviced by an extensive pathway network which links to the costal shared path and the Mitchell Freeway Principle Shared Path.

Previously, the suburb was serviced by the 452 Transperth bus, travelling between Whitfords and Warwick railway stations.

== Politics ==
Hillarys is a reasonably affluent suburb with many "mortgage belt" families, and is one of the strongest bases in the northern suburban region for the Liberal Party at both federal and state elections.

Hillarys is administered by the City of Joondalup although it was administered by the City of Wanneroo prior to the creation of the City of Joondalup in 1998.
