= Marmion, Western Australia =

Marmion Perth, Western Australia
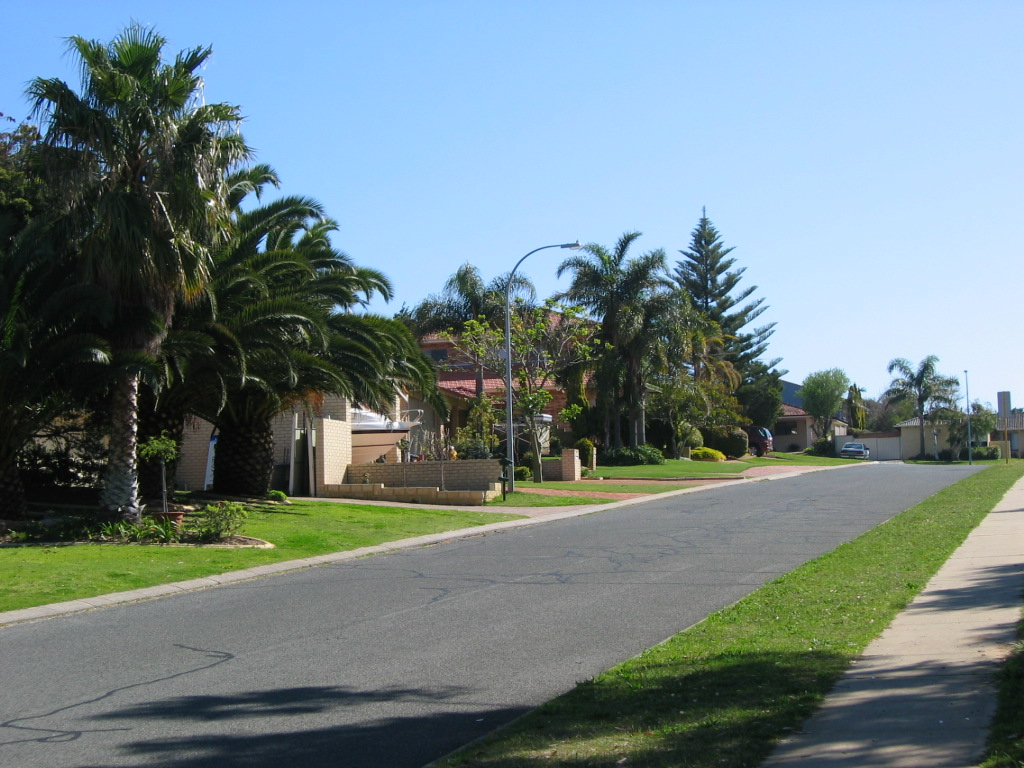
- Radbourn Street, Marmion
- Coordinates: 31.84°S 115.756°E
- Population: 2,390 (SAL 2021)
- Established: 1970s
- Postcode(s): 6020
- Area: 1.2 km^{2} (0.5 sq mi)
- Location: 17 km (11 mi) NW of Perth
- LGA(s): City of Joondalup
- State electorate(s): Carine
- Federal division(s): Moore
Suburbs around Marmion:
	Sorrento	Duncraig
Indian Ocean	Marmion	Duncraig
	Watermans Bay	Carine

Marmion is a northern coastal suburb of Perth, the capital city of Western Australia. Its local government area is the City of Joondalup.

== History ==
Marmion was named after Patrick Marmion, master whaler, who operated a whaling station in the area in 1849. There are still some remains of the old whaling station in the adjacent suburb, Sorrento. A monument to Marmion can be found in Geneff Park in Padbury Circle, Sorrento.

Prior to white settlement, the Whadjuk Aboriginal people, who called the area Mooro, gathered abalone and other shellfish in large numbers off the nearby reefs.

The area was popular with fishermen in the 1930s, and numerous boatsheds and shacks were built there, as well as a whaling station. A townsite was gazetted in the area in 1940, but it remained largely undeveloped until the late 1950s, when the postal district of Marmion was approved. At first, the only development in the area was the primary school, opened in 1956 as a two-teacher school and nicknamed "The Little School in the Bush", accessible only by a track until the mid-1970s. By 1961, the area west of Cliff Street was largely developed, and the Marmion Angling and Aquatic Club had been established. The rest of the suburb was developed between 1973 and 1976.

== Geography ==
Marmion is bounded by High Street and Freeman Way to the north, Marmion Avenue to the east, the Beach Road coastal segment to the south and West Coast Drive and the ocean to the west.

At the 2006 Australian census, Marmion had a population of 2,106 people living in 736 dwellings.

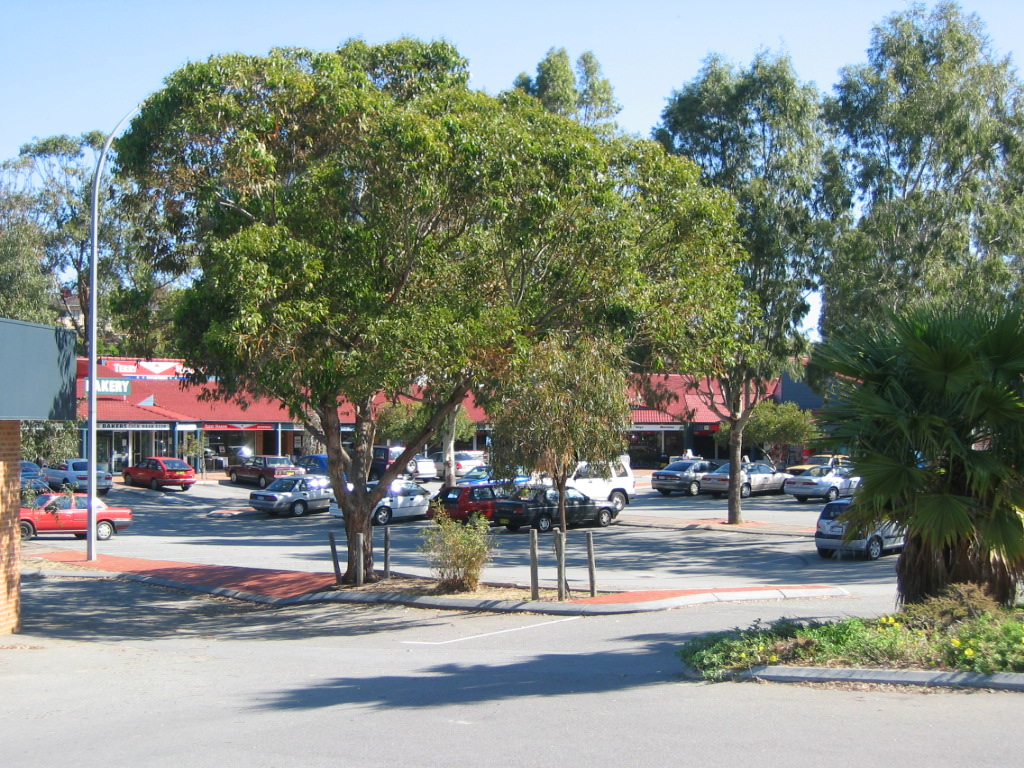
Marmion Village shopping centre

== Facilities ==
Marmion is a residential suburb, relying on the Marmion Village shopping centre in Sheppard Way for basic commercial services, and Karrinyup Shopping Centre and Centro Warwick for other services. The suburb is served by the Marmion Primary School and falls within Carine Senior High School's catchment area. Braden Park, a large park with play equipment and lighting, is situated near the shopping centre.

The Marmion Angling and Aquatic Club is a boating and fishing club located above Marmion Beach, which has a function room overlooking the Indian Ocean. Off the coast is the Marmion Marine Park, which provides a home for many species of marine animals.

== Transport ==
Marmion's west is served by the Transperth 423 bus route between Warwick and Stirling, while the 441 bus along Marmion Avenue serves the eastern part of the suburb. All bus services are operated by Swan Transit.

=== Bus ===
- 423 Warwick Station to Stirling Station – serves Freeman Way, Cliff Street and Beach Road
- 441 Warwick Station to Whitfords Station – serves Freeman Way
- 442 Warwick Station to Whitfords Station – serves Marmion Avenue

== Politics ==
Marmion is a reasonably affluent suburb with a large elderly population. It consistently supports the Liberal Party at both federal and state elections.

== Education ==
Marmion has one state public school, Marmion Primary School, which caters for kindergarten through to year 6.
