= Duncraig Senior High School =

School in Duncraig, Perth, Western Australia

Location
- Duncraig, Perth, Western Australia; Australia; 31°49′21″S 115°45′59″E

Information
- Type: Independent public co-educational high day school
- Motto: Care Engage Excel
- Established: 1979; 47 years ago
- Educational authority: WA Department of Education
- Principal: Myles Draper
- Enrolment: 1,871 (2025)
- Campus type: Suburban
- Colours: Navy blue & white
- Website: www.duncraigshs.wa.edu.au

Duncraig Senior High School is an independent public co-educational high day school, located in the suburb of Duncraig, 18 kilometres (11 mi) north of Perth, Western Australia. The current principal is Myles Draper.

== History ==
The school opened in 1979 with 850 students from various primary schools in the surrounding area. It currently has an average of 1642 students. The opening of Padbury Senior High School in 1987 reduced the number of contributing primary schools. At the closure of Craigie Senior High School in 2004 Duncraig took in year nine and ten students belonging to Craigie's Academic Talent Program.

During a freak storm in March 2010 the school was extensively damaged by hail and torrential rain. As a result, the school was closed for a week for all students. Senior school students then returned but students from Year 8 to 10 were not allowed back until late April following the first term holiday break.

== See also ==
- List of schools in the Perth metropolitan area
