= Carine, Western Australia =

Carine Perth, Western Australia
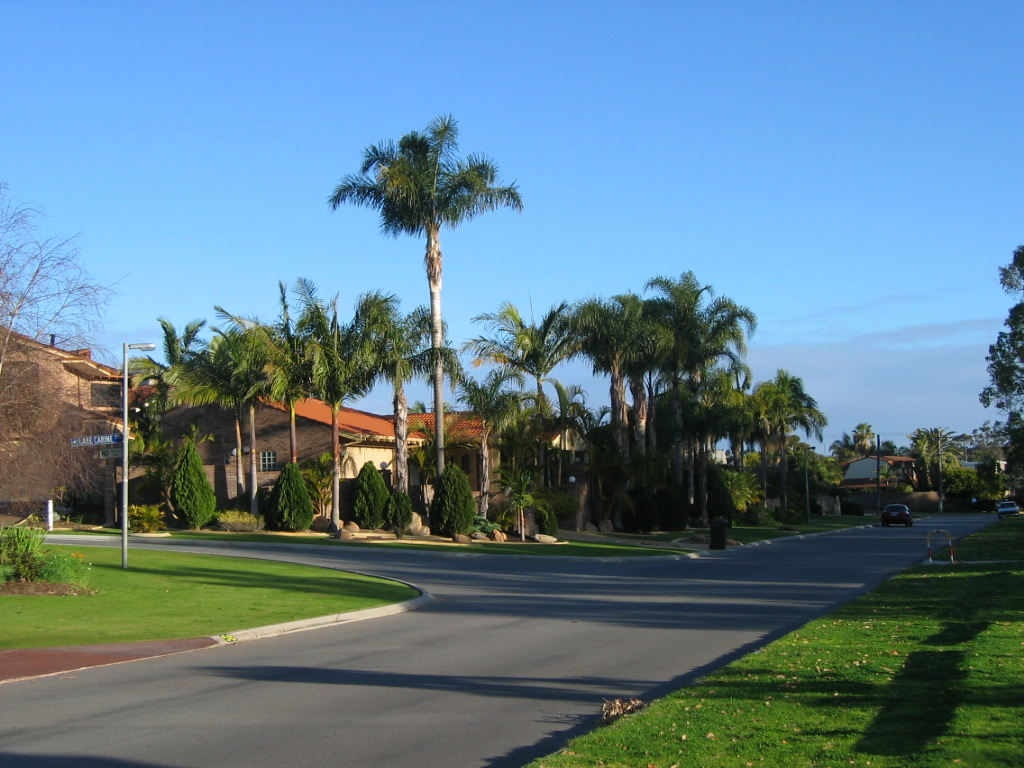
- Monyash Road, Carine
- Coordinates: 31.851°S 115.779°E
- Population: 7,330 (SAL 2021)
- Established: 1973
- Postcode(s): 6020
- Area: 4.7 km^{2} (1.8 sq mi)
- LGA(s): City of Stirling
- State electorate(s): Carine
- Federal division(s): Moore
Suburbs around Carine:
Marmion	Duncraig	Warwick
Watermans Bay	Carine	Hamersley
North Beach	Karrinyup	Gwelup

Carine is a suburb of Perth, the capital city of Western Australia, and is located 14 kilometres (9 mi) north of Perth's central business district (CBD) between Marmion Avenue and Mitchell Freeway. Its local government area is the City of Stirling.

== History ==
The name "Carine" was derived from the two swamps in the area, which were recorded by R. Quinn in a survey in 1865 as "Big Carine Swamp" and "Small Carine Swamp". Carine originally formed part of the Hamersley Estate, which also included the suburbs now known as North Beach, Waterman and Hamersley.

These areas were owned by the Hamersley family, who arrived from Europe to settle in the Swan River Colony in 1837 and built a summer home in what is now North Beach. The majority of land at Carine remained largely undeveloped until the 1960s, with a few market gardens and farms established in the low-lying portions around the swamps, the remainder being timber reserves and a small piggery and horse stable near Little Carine Swamp, and the Beetles Dairy in Okely Road which operated until 1915.

In the early 1970s, the part of the suburb south of what is now Reid Highway was built, and in 1973, Carine High School opened. For several years, the high school and the Carine Gardens Caravan Park and surrounding market gardens on Balcatta Road were the only facilities in the suburb. From 1975 onwards, the residential suburb was built progressively, with the last two stages being completed in 1987, west of Osmaston Road and the Lake Carine Gardens estate (built on a site originally reserved for a school to serve eastern Carine).

The majority of buildings were single detached houses but, with the growth in popularity of infill development, duplexes have become more common.

In 2000, the final stage of Reid Highway was completed despite considerable local opposition. This effectively separated the southern 300m of the suburb (the oldest section) and the caravan park from the rest of Carine.

In November 2013, a plan was announced to redevelop the former Carine Tafe site. The plan included new town housing, apartments, a retirement village, aged care facilities and mixed use space. The project developers for the site are LandCorp, Cedar Woods Properties and St Ives Group.

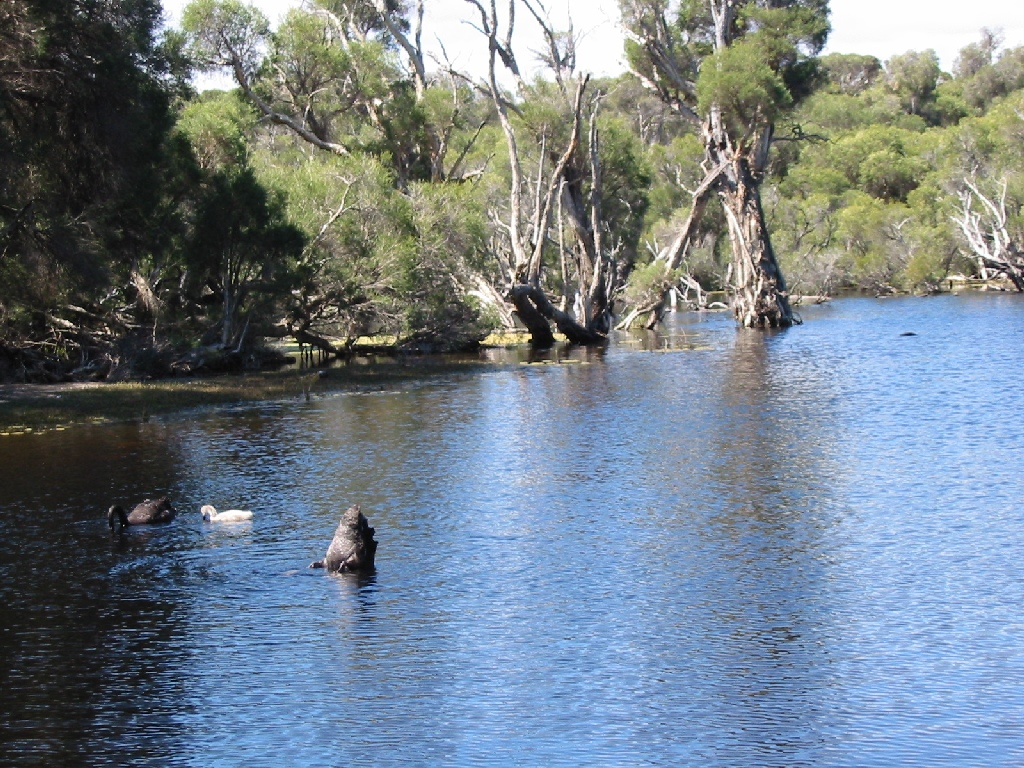
Birdlife at Lake Carine.

== Geography ==
Carine is bounded by Beach Road to the north, Mitchell Freeway to the east, North Beach Road to the south and Marmion Avenue to the west. Carine Regional Open Space sits between Duffy/Monyash Roads and Okely Road, and represents about one-third of the suburb. Reid Highway runs through the southern part of the suburb, and is the suburb's outlet to the Mitchell Freeway and the city.

At the 2016 Australian census, Carine had a mostly middle-income white population of 6,479 people living in 2,425 dwellings, nearly all of which were detached houses on single lots. The ABS reported that nearly half of Carine's workforce were managers or professionals. 65% of all people in Carine are married, and the suburb has a lot more families than the rest of Western Australia.

== Facilities ==
Carine is a residential suburb, relying on the Carine Glades shopping centre on its northern boundary for basic commercial services, and nearby Karrinyup Shopping Centre and Centro Warwick for other services. The suburb is served by a primary school, and a high school (grades 7-12).

Carine Regional Open Space is a wetland reserve centred on the two large swamps, and is home to many rare waterbirds, frogs, turtles and other wildlife. They are served by walking and bicycle tracks. The northern end of the open space contains sports facilities, ovals and a skateboard ramp.

== Transport ==
Carine is served by the Warwick railway station at its northeastern corner, linking the area to the Perth CBD. The suburb is also served by Transperth bus route 425 along Beach Road, Okely and Osmaston Roads and Everingham Street, the 424 along North Beach Road in Carine's south, and other routes along Marmion Avenue and Beach Road.

=== Bus ===
- 424 Karrinyup Bus Station to Stirling Station – serves North Beach Road
- 425 Warwick Station to Stirling Station – serves Beach Road, Okely Road, Osmaston Road, Almadine Drive, Silica Road, Everingham Street and North Beach Road

Bus routes serving Beach Road:

- 423 Warwick Station to Stirling Station
- 441, 442, 443 and 444 Warwick Station to Whitfords Station

== Politics ==
Carine is a reasonably affluent suburb with many "mortgage belt" families and socially liberal voters. It consistently supports the Liberal Party at both federal and state elections where it is located in the Australian Labor Party-held federal Division of Moore and state Electoral district of Carine respectively. Prior to the district of Carine being created in 1996, the suburb was in the Electoral district of Marmion, and before that Karrinyup.
