= Percy Doyle Reserve =

Sporting facility in Perth, Western Australia

Coordinates: 31°50′12″S 115°46′02″E

- Interactive map of Percy Doyle Reserve
- Location: Duncraig, Western Australia
- Owner: City of Joondalup
- Capacity: 5,000
- Surface: Grass

Tenant
- Sorrento FC Sorrento Tennis Club Sorrento Bowling Club Wanneroo Joondalup Tee-Ball Club

Percy Doyle Reserve is a sporting and recreational facility in Duncraig, Western Australia. Spanning a substantial area, the reserve serves as a central hub for community activities and various sports.

== Facilities ==
The reserve has diverse facilities catering various sports and activities:

- 3 soccer fields
- 1 AFL size oval
- 20 tennis courts
- 6 lawn bowl greens
- 4 clubrooms
- Library and community garden
- Recreation centre (including gym and basketball courts)
- Adventure Hub. An $8.1 million Duncraig Adventure Hub, including a skate park, bike track, multipurpose court, play space, barbecues, and shaded areas. The adventure hub opened in September 2025.

== Clubs ==
The reserve offers a home to many local sporting clubs:

Percy Doyle Reserve Sporting Clubs
Club	Sport	Established	Major Leagues
Sorrento Football Club "Gulls"	Soccer/Football	1972	National Premier League Western Australia
Sorrento Tennis Club	Tennis	1973	
Sorrento Bowling Club "Swans"	Bowls	1976	
Undercroft Bridge Club	Contract bridge		
Wanneroo Joondalup Tee Ball Club "Roos"	Tee-ball	1975	

Football: The main soccer oval at Percy Doyle Reserve is currently used for association football. The ground is used by Sorrento FC in the National Premier League Western Australia, and it has previously been used by Perth Glory Women in the W-League and Perth Glory FC Youth in the National Youth League. The ground is surrounded by a series of football pitches used by various teams competing in Football West competitions. The facility was used as the team base camp for Haiti during the 2023 FIFA Women's World Cup. Sorrento Football Club were the 2024 Football State League Champions.

Tennis: The Sorrento Tennis Club was home to the Mt Lawley Sorrento Planets in the Tennis West Men's State League from 2023-2025, before not renewing their contract for the 2025/26 season.. They played half their home games at the Sorrento Tennis Club and the other half at the Mt Lawley Tennis Centre in Mt Lawley. Mens State League is the highest semi-professional tennis league in Western Australia. The Planets were established before the 2023/24 State League season, finishing last on the ladder in their first season. Prior to the Planets, Sorrento participated in the Men's State League competition for most seasons until the 2016/17 season. They won the Men's State League shield in 1997/98 season.
