= North Beach, Western Australia =

North Beach
- Suburb
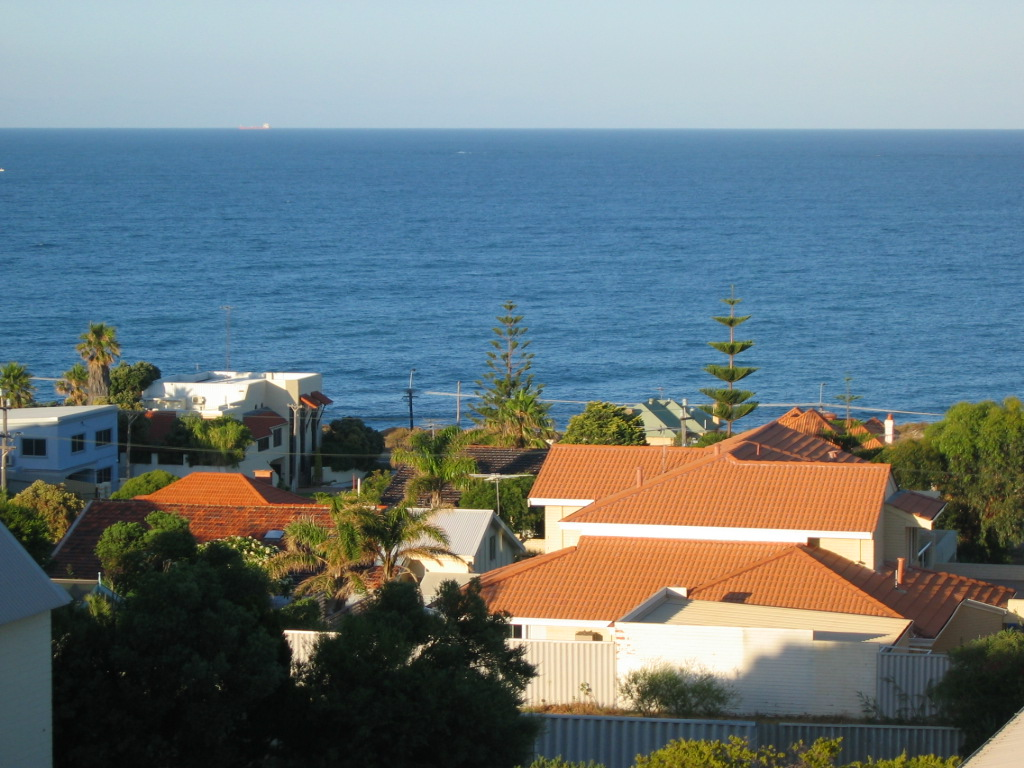
- View from Mount Flora
- Interactive map of North Beach
- Coordinates: 31.861°S 115.758°E
- Country: Australia
- State: Western Australia
- City: Perth
- LGA: City of Stirling
- Location: 16 km (9.9 mi) NW of Perth CBD
- Established: 1940s

Government
  - State electorate: Carine
  - Federal division: Moore

Area
  - Total: 1.7 km^{2} (0.66 sq mi)

Population
  - Total: 3,689 (SAL 2021)
- Postcode: 6020
Suburbs around North Beach
	Watermans Bay	Carine
Indian Ocean	North Beach	Carine
	Trigg	Karrinyup

North Beach is a northern coastal suburb of Perth, the capital city of Western Australia 16 kilometres (10 mi) from Perth's central business district via Mitchell Freeway and Reid Highway. Its local government area is the City of Stirling.

== History ==
The name North Beach began as a descriptive name, derived from the suburb being at the time the most northerly of Perth's beaches. It was assigned in 1888 when surveyor Charles Crossland referred to the pastoral leases of Samuel Richard Hamersley as his "north beach coastal run".

The area originally formed part of the Hamersley Estate, which also included the suburbs now known as Carine, North Beach and Hamersley. These areas were owned by the Hamersley family, who arrived from Europe to settle in the Swan River Colony in 1837 and built a summer home, called "The Castle" in 1865, where their large family as well as the Perth elite congregated for summer holidays. "The Castle" was later converted into the Castle Hotel, but after 75 years was demolished and subdivided in 1998.

Originally set aside as a timber reserve, the area was first settled by pastoralists in the 1860s. It served as a stopping point and watering hole along the Coastal Stock Route between Dongara (near Geraldton) and Fremantle. Cattle drovers frequented the area and Afghan camel drivers were a common sight after the opening of the goldfields in the 1890s - the area also served as a quarantine area for camels entering the colony. A number of orchards operated in the area - the only evidence that remains today is an old olive tree on Hope Street.

The only way into the area at this time was via a wooden block road built by convicts (later Wanneroo Road) and then along a limestone track to North Beach, although numerous tracks through the bushland were developed as time progressed.

During World War I, the Australian 10th Light Horse Regiment was stationed at Mount Flora on coast-watch duties, and kept their horses at a yard at the corner of modern-day Hope and Hale Streets. During the Great Depression, the area around the intersection of West Coast Drive and North Beach Road was a "tent city" that housed "many unfortunate people 'on hard times'".

After World War II, the area developed rapidly, and in 1954, the Postal District of North Beach was approved. By 1961, nearly all of the existing suburb had been built and settled.

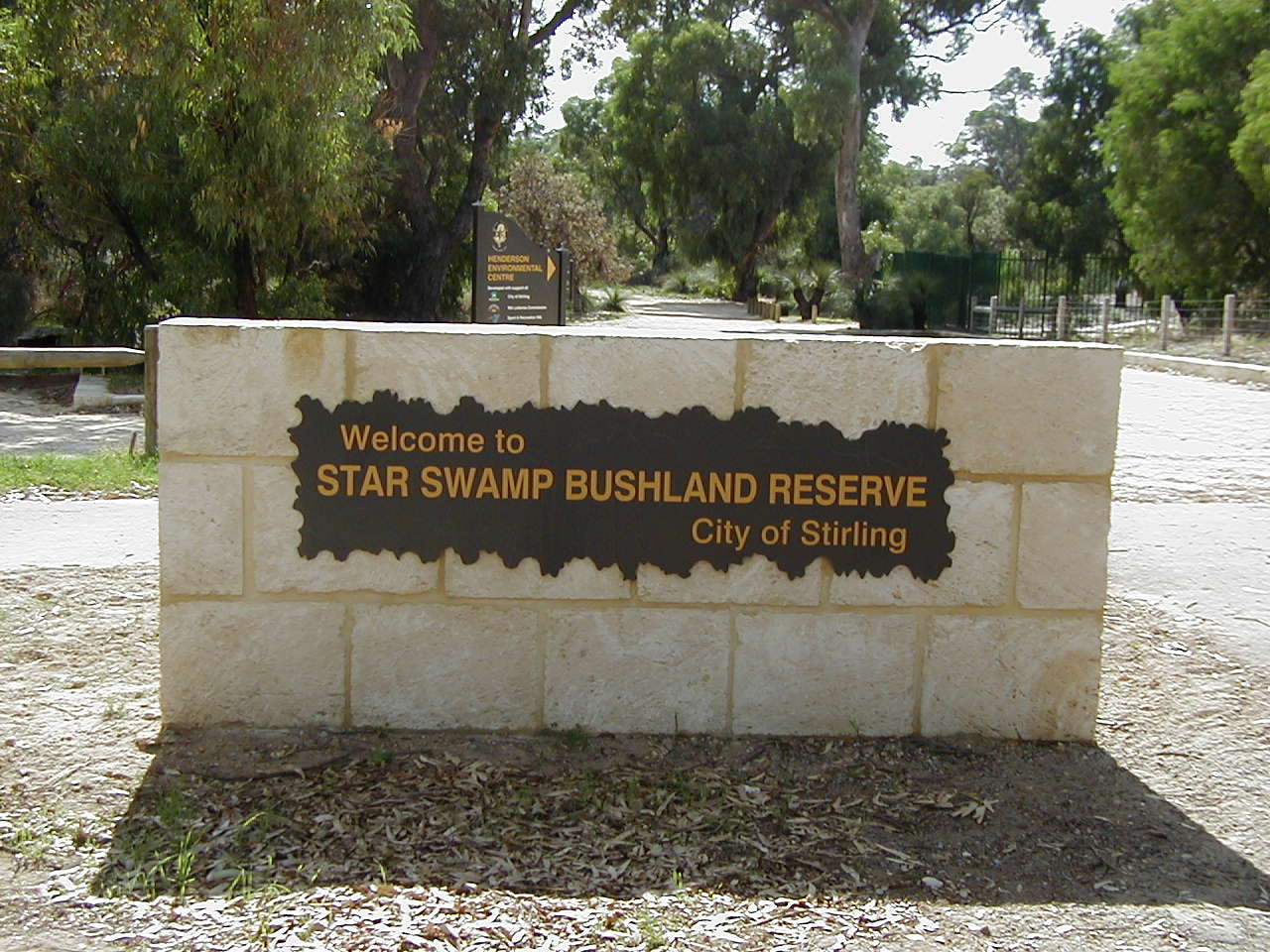
Star Swamp Bushland Reserve

=== Star Swamp ===
Star Swamp Bushland Reserve is a bushland reserve occupying about half of the land area of the suburbs of Watermans Bay and North Beach. The precise origin of the name is unknown, but the earliest known use of the name was on a lease application by J.H.Okely of Wanneroo in 1868.

In 1987, the State Government set aside 96 hectares as an A-class reserve, and funding from the Bicentennial Commemorative Program and assistance from local organisations facilitated the establishment of the Star Swamp Heritage Trail within the reserve.

== Geography ==
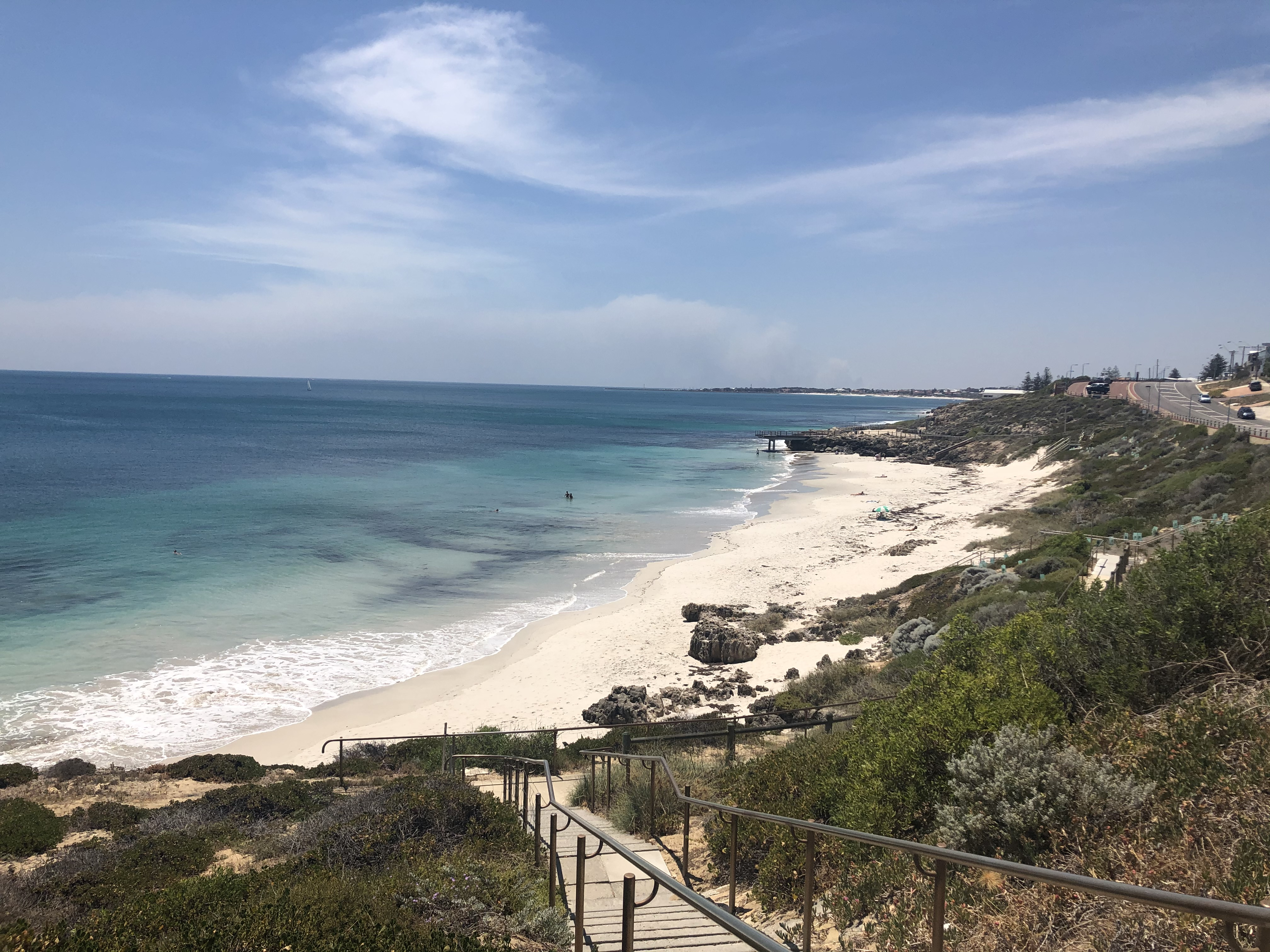
North Beach looking north towards the pier

North Beach is bounded by Hale Street to the north, Marmion Avenue to the east, an imprecise line near Lynn Street to the south and West Coast Drive and the ocean to the west. Star Swamp represents one-third of the suburb's area. Reid Highway empties into North Beach's eastern border, and is the suburb's outlet to the Mitchell Freeway and the city.

At the 2001 Australian census, North Beach had a population of 2,949 people living in 1,270 dwellings, with a median age of 42 years (among the oldest in the northern suburbs). Residential styles in North Beach include a mix of holiday dwellings from before and after World War II, some former workers' houses, and modern dwellings.

== Facilities ==
North Beach is a residential suburb, with small shopping areas on the coast and at Flora Terrace and Castle Street which offer basic commercial services. Nearby Karrinyup Shopping Centre provides other services. North Beach features a tennis club (synthetic and hard surfaces) near Our Lady of Grace. The suburb contains North Beach Primary School and the private Our Lady of Grace school - Carine Senior High School is nearby.

Star Swamp Bushland Reserve is accessible from the eastern edge of the suburb (Hope Street and Groat Street).

On the northern boundary is the Mount Flora Regional Museum, built in 1936 as a water tower at the highest point of the suburb to provide scheme water to surrounding areas. It was phased out of service in the 1970s, and converted to a museum and lookout in May 1986. It now details the region's history, and is home to the North Suburban Historical Society.

== Transport ==
North Beach is served by the Transperth 423 bus route between Warwick and Stirling, operated by Swan Transit.

In 1925, the North Beach Bus Company was started by Alf Lehman with crimson charabancs. It was taken over by the James family in 1928, in an era when REO buses drove over plank roads through the wetlands between modern-day Tuart Hill and North Beach. The company was taken over by the Metropolitan Transport Trust on 30 September 1961.

== Politics ==
North Beach is an affluent suburb with a large elderly population. It consistently supports the Liberal Party at both federal and state elections. However, voters in this suburb lean more towards progressive parties than in similar-demographic Watermans Bay and Marmion.

2004 federal election Source: AEC
Liberal	52.9%
Labor	32.3%
Greens	8.91%
CDP	2.21%
Democrats	1.22%

2001 federal election Source: AEC
Liberal	47.6%
Labor	30.9%
Greens	8.51%
Democrats	6.74%
One Nation	3.19%

1998 federal election Source: AEC
Liberal	48.4%
Labor	31.4%
Greens	7.05%
One Nation	6.89%
Democrats	5.10%

2005 state election Source: WAEC
Liberal	47.5%
Labor	36.3%
Greens	12.7%
CDP	3.4%

2001 state election Source: WAEC
Liberal	38.3%
Labor	27.2%
Independent	12.6%
Greens	7.88%
One Nation	6.21%

1996 state election Source: WAEC
Liberal	42.2%
Independent	22.7%
Labor	21.0%
Greens	8.58%
Independent	5.47%
