= Duncraig, Western Australia =

Duncraig
- Suburb
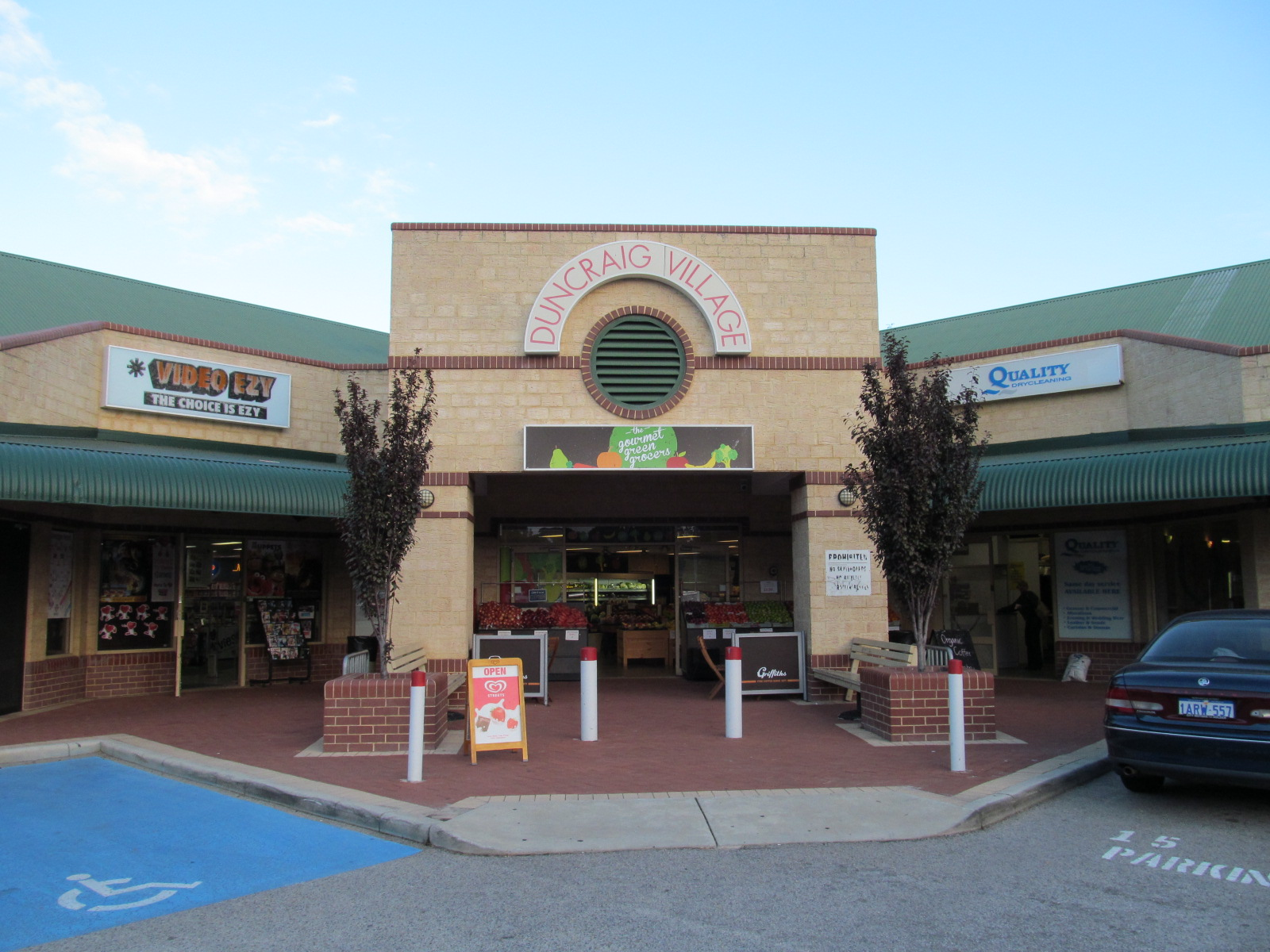
- Duncraig Village Shopping Centre
- Interactive map of Duncraig
- Coordinates: 31.833°S 115.777°E
- Country: Australia
- State: Western Australia
- City: Perth
- LGA: City of Joondalup
- Location: 16 km (9.9 mi) N of Perth CBD
- Established: 1960s

Government
  - State electorate: Carine
  - Federal division: Moore

Area
  - Total: 7.5 km^{2} (2.9 sq mi)

Population
  - Total: 15,982 (SAL 2021)
- Postcode: 6023
Suburbs around Duncraig
Hillarys	Padbury	Kingsley
Sorrento	Duncraig	Greenwood
Marmion	Carine	Warwick

Duncraig is a northern suburb of Perth, the capital city of Western Australia, and is located 16 kilometres (10 mi) north of Perth's central business district (CBD) between Marmion Avenue and Mitchell Freeway. Its local government area is the City of Joondalup.

== History ==
Not much is known about Duncraig before the residential settlement boom – the majority of land in the area remained largely undeveloped until the 1960s. In 1969, the name Duncraig was approved, and was first used as a promotional name. It is of Scottish origin.

In 1967, planning stages commenced for a Marmion Town Centre with 17,000 square metres (180,000 sq ft) of retail space by 1986 in the southwestern corner of the suburb to be developed by the Lands Department in conjunction with the Rural and Industries Bank. A mining lease for sand and limestone was held by Thiess Brothers over part of the land in question (Reserve 8018), so the Lands Department suggested a road (now Burragah Way) be built to separate the proposed centre from the lease. A detailed submission for the centre was made in 1977 by T.S. Martin and Associates, but Warwick, Karrinyup and small local centres had filled the retail need in the area and population had developed somewhat differently from original expectations, so the plan was shelved. Plans to develop a large retail centre were resurrected in the late 1980s to local protest, after which the area was the last to be developed for residential use.

The bulk of the suburb was built in the mid-1970s, with infrastructure being built almost at the same time – Davallia Primary School (February 1974), Duncraig Library (July 1974) and Duncraig Primary School (February 1975). In 1979, the Carine Glades tavern on Beach Road (now "The Carine"), Glengarry Private Hospital and Duncraig Senior High School all opened.

Duncraig's development (1960–1990)

In 1983, the Uniting Church in Australia opened St Stephen's School, a secondary, co-educational day school, in the northeastern corner of the suburb, which expanded to include a primary school in 1993. St Stephen's School is the largest independent school in Western Australia. In 1986, the suburb was finally linked directly to the CBD via the Mitchell Freeway.

== Geography ==
Duncraig is bounded by Beach Road to the south, Mitchell Freeway to the east, Hepburn Avenue to the north and Marmion Avenue to the west, and Warwick Road runs through the centre of the suburb. Almost all of Duncraig is residential, although many small parks and bushland areas can be found throughout. In the Northwest corner of Duncraig is a tangle of streets named after Gilbert and Sullivan characters and personalities. Gilbert Road meets Sullivan Road there, near Savoy Place, Pinafore Court, and streets named after 30 characters from the Gilbert and Sullivan operas. The only Gilbert and Sullivan performer with a street named after him is Bernard Manning (1888–1961), a performer with the J. C. Williamson company and founder of the Gilbert and Sullivan Society of Western Australia in Perth.

== Facilities ==
Duncraig is a residential suburb, although has numerous small parks and bushland areas, and the Percy Doyle Reserve which contains a library and recreation centre. It also contains a multipurpose sports complex including several football fields and soccer pitches, lawn bowl greens and 20 tennis courts. Percy Doyle Reserve is home to Sorrento Football Club who participates in the National Premier League Western Australia, as well as the Sorrento Tennis Club who participates in the Tennis West State League.

Several neighbourhood shopping centres are dotted throughout the suburb, the largest of which are Glengarry and Carine Glades. Nearby the Centro Warwick to the southeast, Karrinyup Shopping Centre to the south and Westfield Whitford City to the northwest provide for a wide range of retail shopping. Glengarry Private Hospital, together with a number of specialist medical centres/services are located on Arnisdale Road behind the Glengarry shopping area.

Just beyond Duncraig's southern boundary is Carine Regional Open Space, a wetland reserve centred on two large swamps which is home to many rare waterbirds, frogs, turtles and other wildlife. The space is served by walking and bicycle tracks and also offers AFL, Soccer Pitches, tennis courts and is also home to the Carine Cats baseball and teeball clubs.

== Education ==
Duncraig contains Duncraig Senior High School (Years 7–12) and a private school operated by the Uniting Church, St Stephen's School (Years K-12). The area south of Warwick Road falls within the catchment area of Carine Senior High School (Years 7–12). Also, Duncraig contains four state primary schools with Davallia being the oldest among all four:

- Davallia (1974)
- Duncraig (1975)
- Glengarry (1980)
- Poynter (1980)

== Transport ==
Duncraig is served by the Warwick train/bus interchange at its southeastern corner, and Greenwood train station at its northeastern corner, linking the area to the Perth CBD

. The suburb is also served by Transperth buses along Beach Road, Glengarry and Poynter Drives, Davallia, Lilburne and Readshaw Roads, and Marmion Avenue (423, 441, 442, 443, 444). All bus services are operated by Swan Transit.

== Sport ==
There are many sport clubs based in Duncraig, catering for all sporting members of the community.

Club	Moniker	Sport	Location	Est.	Major Leagues
Sorrento Football Club	Gulls	Soccer	Percy Doyle Reserve	1972	National Premier League WA (NPL WA)
Sorrento Tennis Club	Planets*	Tennis	Percy Doyle Reserve	1973	Men's State League (MSL)
Sorrento Duncraig Junior Football Club	Hawks	Australian Football	Seacrest Park (Sorrento) Percy Doyle Reserve	1971	
Sorrento Bowling Club	Swans	Lawn Bowls	Percy Doyle Reserve	1976	
Northern Knights Cricket Club	Knights	Cricket	Glengarry Park		
Duncraig Recreation Centre			Percy Doyle Reserve		

== Politics ==
Duncraig is a reasonably affluent suburb with many "mortgage belt" families. It consistently supports the Liberal Party at both federal and state elections, with the strongest support located in the southeastern part of Duncraig, served by the Davallia Primary polling booth.

Duncraig is administered by the City of Joondalup although previously administered by the City of Wanneroo prior to the creation of the City of Joondalup in 1998.

2004 federal election
Liberal	61%
Labor	27%
Greens	7.0%
CDP	2.2%
One Nation	1.5%

2001 federal election
Liberal	56%
Labor	28%
Greens	5.3%
Democrats	5.1%
One Nation	3.2%

2005 state election
Liberal	49%
Labor	35%
Greens	8.6%
CDP	4.0%
Independent	2.1%

2001 state election
Liberal	46%
Labor	25%
Independent	10.5%
Greens	6.2%
One Nation	5.6%

== Notable people ==
- Clint Hinchliffe, cricketer
- Matt Parker, mathematician, author and comedian, grew up in Duncraig.
- Melanie Perkins founded web-based graphics design software Canva in her family's Duncraig home. It is now Australia's only private company valued over US$1 billion.
- Daniel Ricciardo, a Formula One racing driver, grew up in Duncraig.
- Wes Robinson, cricketer
