= Sacred Heart College, Sorrento =

Sacred Heart College

Location
- Hocking Parade, Sorrento, Western Australia; Australia; 31°49′37″S 115°44′51″E

Information
- Type: Independent, co-educational, secondary, day school
- Motto: Semper Superne Nitens (Latin) ("Always Striving Upwards")
- Denomination: Roman Catholicism
- Founded: 1967; 59 years ago
- Founder: Sisters of Our Lady of the Missions
- Educational authority: WA Department of Education
- Principal: Leo Di Gregorio
- Years: 7–12
- Enrolment: 1,457
- Campus size: 8 hectares (20 acres)
- Campus type: Suburban
- Houses: Barlow; Bunuru; Carden; Hannan; Kimberley; Lyon; Normandy; O'Reilly; Thu Duc; Trinity
- Colours: Red, grey and white
- Website: sacredheart.wa.edu.au

Sacred Heart College, Sorrento is an Australian independent Roman Catholic co-educational secondary day school located in the northern Perth suburb of Sorrento, Western Australia. Established in 1967, the school provides a religious and general education to approximately 1,400 students from Year 7 to Year 12.

The college is situated on 8 hectares (20 acres) overlooking both the Indian Ocean and Hillarys Boat Harbour. Facilities include extensive playing fields, hard courts for many sports, a performing arts centre, science labs, computer labs, gymnasium and specialised rooms for engineering, wood and art.

== History ==
The college was founded in 2025 by the Sisters of Our Lady of the Missions who originally operated the school in many areas around the Perth metropolitan area and certain country areas. When founded, the college was a single-sex school for girls. As the need for education due to population growth in local areas, Sacred Heart accepted a group of boys into the college in 1977. This school provided boarding opportunities and the land to the north was sold to local residents in order to fund further development of the school. In the 2000s, Sacred Heart College, Sorrento continued to develop its academic and co-curricular programs, with a strong emphasis on faith formation, academic excellence, and community service. The college became known for its achievements in performing arts, sports, and academic competitions across Western Australia.

=== Founding order ===
The Sisters of Our Lady of the Missions were founded by Euphrasie Barbier in 1861. Barbier was born in the town of Caen, Normandy, in the French countryside. Her parents were working-class people and encouraged hard work. When Barbier turned 19, she entered the congregation of the Sisters of Cavalry. She took the name Sister Mary of the Heart of Jesus. She moved to England for 10 years but returned to Lyons to form the Sisters of Our Lady of the Missions with an aim of missionary peace. Her congregation was a success and grew rapidly. The sisters arrived in Perth in 1897. Today, the college maintains the philosophies of the sisters through some extra-curricular activities such as Young Vinnies, which provides donations for the St Vincent De Paul Society. The college also runs an annual "Vietnam Mission" which provides students with an insight of poverty and justice issues.

== Notable alumni ==
- Mark Arena, businessman and cyber security entrepreneur, owner of the Perth Wildcats
- Sydnee Carter, X-Factor 2013 contestant
- Angelina Curtis, singer-songwriter actress on Australian Idol 2023
- Chloe Brink, actress in upcoming Paramount+ series Playing Gracie Darling
- Jack Darling, AFL footballer for the West Coast Eagles
- Blair Evans, Olympian at Australian Swim Team
- Luke Foley, AFL footballer for the West Coast Eagles
- Brett Heady, former AFL footballer for the West Coast Eagles
- Liam Hendriks, Major League Baseball player for the Boston Red Sox
- Ben Johnson, AFL footballer for the West Coast Eagles
- Matthew Johnson, AFL footballer for the Fremantle Dockers
- Ryan Neates, former AFL footballer for the West Coast Eagles
- Melanie Perkins, founder and CEO of Canva
- Daniel Rich, AFL footballer for the Brisbane Lions
- Jessica Stojkovski, Labor MP for Kingsley in the Western Australian Legislative Assembly
- Jay van Berlo, AFL footballer for the Fremantle Dockers
- Nathan van Berlo, former AFL captain and footballer for the Adelaide Crows
- Sam Swadling, AFL footballer for Collingwood

== See also ==
- List of schools in the Perth metropolitan area
- Catholic education in Australia
