= Hillarys Boat Harbour =

Marina and tourist precinct in Western Australia

Coordinates: 31°49′27″S 115°44′10″E

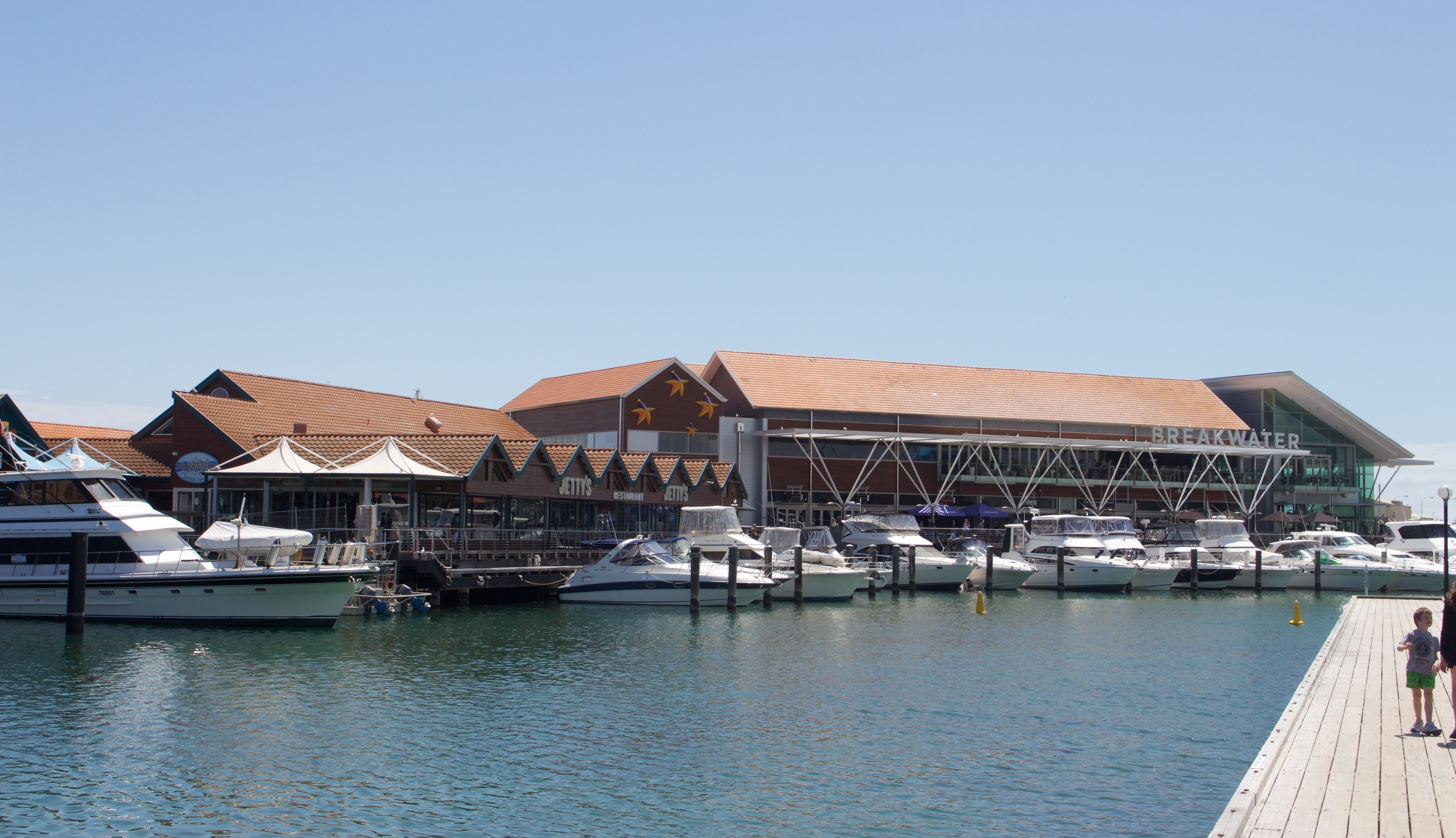
Restaurants and promenade

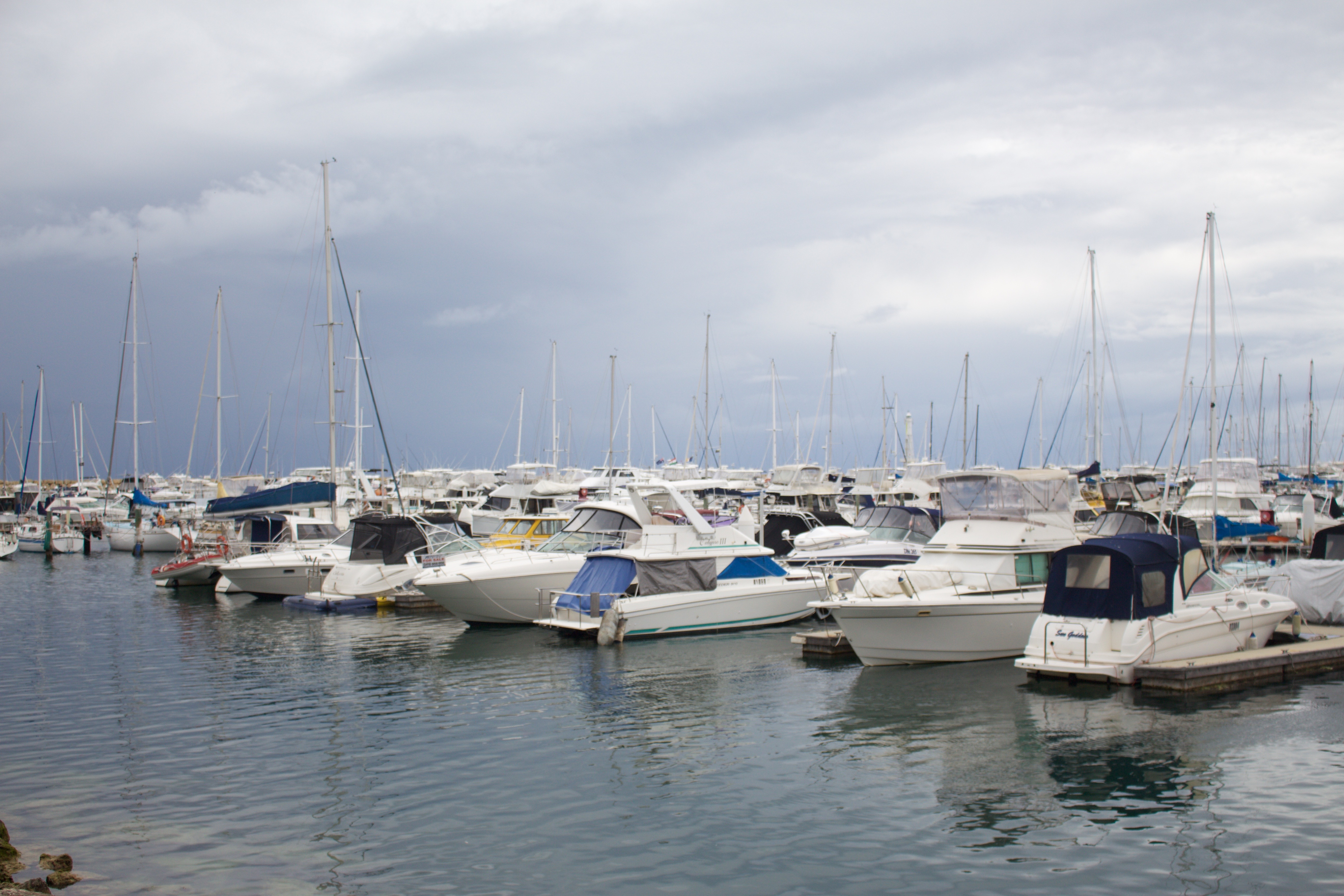
Boat pens

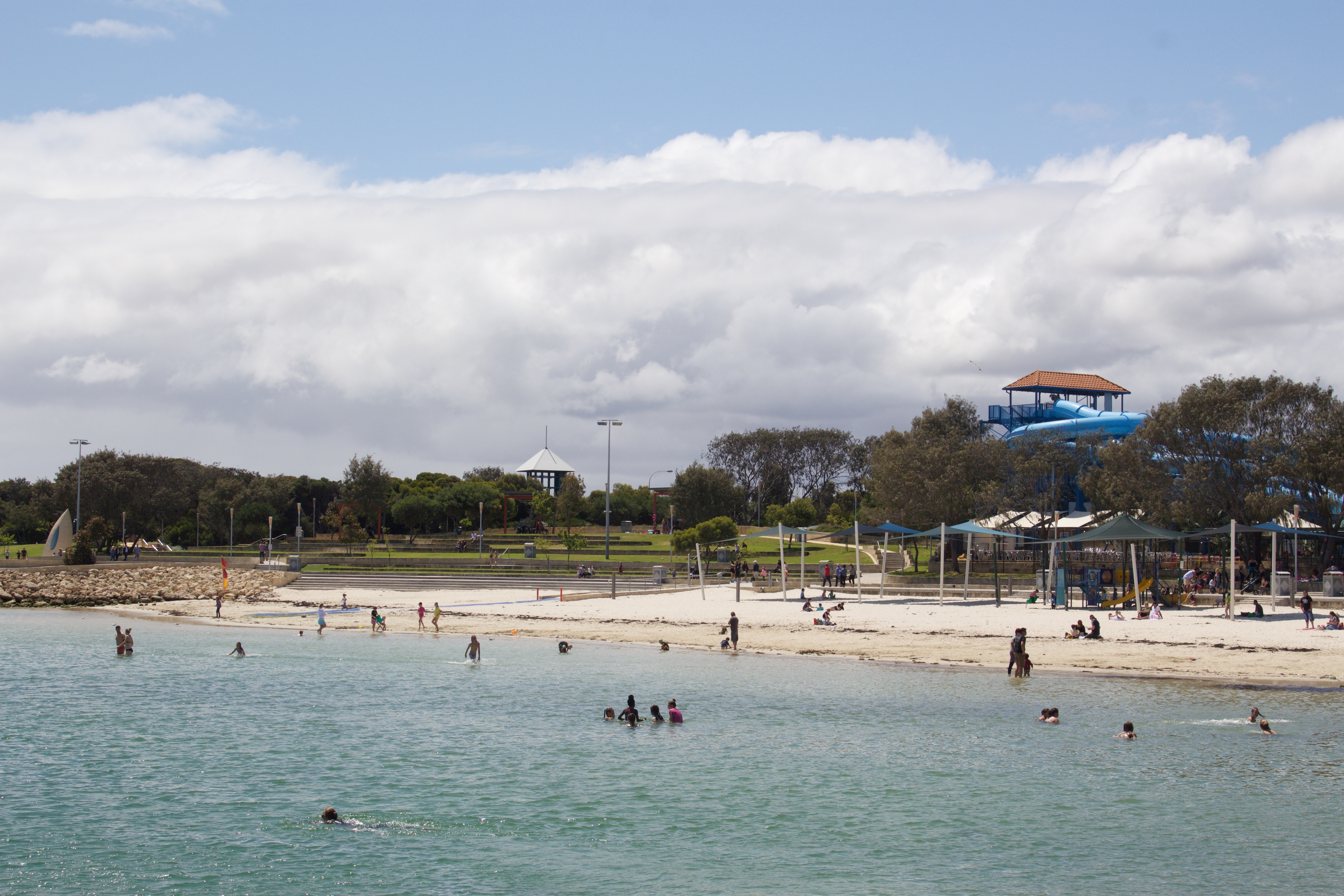
Beach and waterslides of The Great Escape visible in the background in 2015, prior to demolition

Hillarys Boat Harbour is a marina and tourist precinct located in Hillarys, north of Perth, Western Australia, and on the Indian Ocean. The marina also contains two retail precincts, Sorrento Quay and Hillarys Boardwalk.

== History ==
Hillarys Boat Harbour was the first such major marina in the north metropolitan region of Perth. Construction of the new marina commenced in September 1985; protestors laid down in front of bulldozers in an attempt to halt early site works. Boat launching facilities were completed in October 1986 and boats started moving into pen moorings two months later, just before the start of the 1987 America's Cup Challenge Series. Developed by the Lombardo Group, Sorrento Quay commenced trading in December 1987, and the marina was officially opened in January 1988.

In 1989 receivers were appointed to sell the assets of the Lombardo Group, and Sorrento Quay was sold to the Japanese group Victoria Co. In 1995, an amusement park named The Great Escape opened on the eastern side of the harbour, adjacent to the beach. The complex included three water slides, trampolines, dry attractions and a mini-golf course called "Wacky Putt". In 1999, the Wyllie Group bought Sorrento Quay for $16 million from Victoria Co.

In late 2004, the Wyllie Group announced a $9 million plan, designed by Cox, Howlett & Bailey Woodland, to expand the boat harbour's Sorrento Quay shopping precinct by expanding the northern side of the facility with 800 square metres (8,600 sq ft) of retail and dining space and a two-storey tavern of 1,500 square metres (16,000 sq ft). A 175-metre (574 ft) footbridge with a drawbridge, would cross the harbour from the new area to the northern parking area. The Western Australian Planning Commission approved the now $12 million project in 2005 and the Wyllie Group lodged an application for a building licence in November of the same year.

In May 2006, the Department for Planning & Infrastructure committed $5 million to expand the area they managed at the boat harbour with boardwalks, upgrades to picnic areas, new barbecue facilities, toilets, improved lightning, trees, grass and shade structures with work to begin in August of that year. The new development cost $30 million when it was opened by MLA Rob Johnson on 13 December 2008. The new Breakwater Tavern had been fitted out at $7 million by the Reid family. A further 19 marine pens had been constructed along with a new Rottnest Island ferry terminal. Another stage was planned with the redevelopment of the old tavern and the adding of more shops and food and beverage facilities.

In June 2016, The Great Escape closed after its tenancy lease wasn't renewed, but briefly reopened with the dry attractions, trampolines and Wacky Putt operating in Summer 2016. The park was eventually demolished in November 2017 after standing idle for nine months. On 12 September 2018, after leaseholder Wyllie Group struck a deal with local family company, Pirate's Cove Adventure Golf, plans emerged of a complex in the former Great Escape site that would include two themed 18-hole golf courses, a double flowrider, a cafe, a small bar and a beach kiosk, with completion scheduled in March 2019. However the next month, the project was suddenly cancelled following negative publicity surrounding a shareholder of Pirate's Cove Adventure Golf and his previous business relationship with notorious child rapist William Goad.

In February 2025, the state government pledged $14.1 million towards upgrades to the precinct; these include refurbished toilets and changerooms, upgrades to an existing fishing platform, and the redevelopment of the former Great Escape site into a plaza for youth and families with a skatepark and climbing wall.

== Attractions ==
Hillarys is also home to Aquarium of Western Australia (AQWA) which showcases the marine life and unique regions of Western Australia's 12,000-kilometre (7,500 mi) coastline.

The harbour contains a sheltered beach within its breakwaters. Other attractions in and around the harbour include helicopter flights, fishing charters and cruises. A ferry also departs from here to Rottnest Island daily.

== See also ==
- Little Island
