= Mortgage belt =

Australian political term

The Mortgage belt is a term used in Australian politics to signify residential suburbs which have a high concentration of families mortgaging their homes.

Often the belt covers areas where homes could be considered more affordable yet the cost of servicing the mortgage loan represents a high proportion of the families' available income. Changes to cost of servicing a mortgage, seen through interest rate fluctuations, can trigger widespread satisfaction or dissatisfaction towards the government of the day.

== History ==
In the 2004 federal election, the media played up the narrative the mortgage belt voted highly in favour of the Coalition, in fear that economic management under the Australian Labor Party could increase interest rates. The Coalition ran a fear campaign on the issue and this became one of the keystones which helped it win a successive fourth term. However, it is generally agreed that governments have little control over interest rates, which are set by the Reserve Bank of Australia. There is little evidence in the political science literature to support the media's narrative for the mortgage belt making negative economic assessments of the Labor Party instead leader effects had a far larger impact on vote choice with a significant effect for negative assessments of the Labor leader, Mark Latham, on the defection of Labor partisans to the Coalition.

In March 2005, interest rates rose by a quarter of a percent.

Mortgage belt areas played a significant role in the 2007 election, where Labor won back many mortgage belt Liberal strongholds won in the 1996 election due to general disaffection with the incumbent government, as well as high interest rates.

== International use ==
The term has also seen use in New Zealand by political and economic commentators.

== See also ==
- Australian property bubble
- New Zealand property bubble
- Swing voter
