= Karrinyup, Western Australia =

Perth suburb

Karrinyup
- Suburb
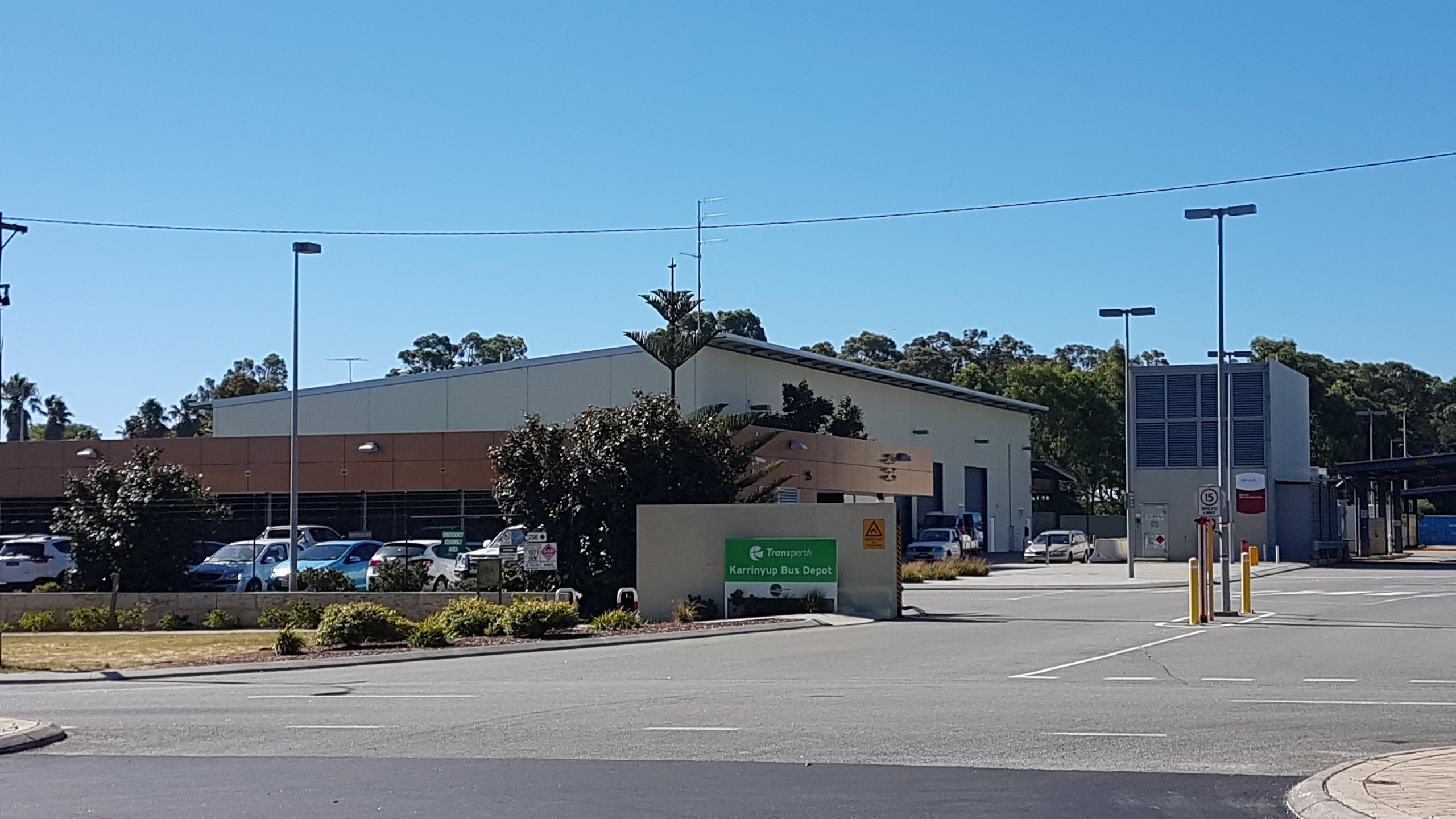
- The Transperth bus depot in Karrinyup
- Interactive map of Karrinyup
- Coordinates: 31.875°S 115.777°E
- Country: Australia
- State: Western Australia
- City: Perth
- LGA: City of Stirling
- Location: 12 km (7.5 mi) from Perth
- Established: 1950s

Government
  - State electorate: Scarborough
  - Federal division: Curtin

Area
  - Total: 6.5 km^{2} (2.5 sq mi)

Population
  - Total: 9,886 (SAL 2021)
- Postcode: 6018
Suburbs around Karrinyup
North Beach	Carine	Carine
Trigg	Karrinyup	Gwelup
Scarborough	Doubleview	Innaloo

Karrinyup is a suburb of Perth, the capital city of Western Australia, and is located 12 km north of Perth's central business district. Its local government area is the City of Stirling.

== History ==
The name Karrinyup was originally derived from the word Careniup, a Noongar name for a nearby swamp, an Aboriginal word apparently meaning "the place where bush kangaroos graze". It may also mean "the place where spiders are". In the 1840s, Samuel Moore took up a grant of 780 acres (3.2 km^{2}) in the northern part of the suburb. Moore's grant, Swan Location 92 was surveyed by P Chauncey in 1844 and Chauncey recorded a large swamp just to the east of Karrinyup as Careniup Swamp.

In 1929, the foundation committee developing the Lake Karrinyup Country Club golf course opted to change the spelling.

While the area had been subdivided by Charles Stoneman in 1904 and roads built, the country club remained the only significant feature in the area, and rapid growth did not begin until 1957, with the part south of Karrinyup Road developing first. At this stage, the only access to the area from Perth was via Wanneroo Road and Balcatta Beach Road. The building of the Mitchell Freeway to Karrinyup Road in 1983-84 facilitated the growth of Karrinyup and nearby Stirling as a regional hub.

== Geography ==
Karrinyup is bounded by North Beach Road to the north (Reid Highway is located just a few hundred metres further north), Marmion Avenue to the west, Newborough Street to the south and Huntriss Road and the country club to the east. About one-third of Karrinyup's land area is reserve or bushland, or part of the suburb's two golf courses. Karrinyup Road links Marmion Avenue and West Coast Highway to Mitchell Freeway through the suburb.

At the 2016 Australian census, Karrinyup had a population of 9,283. Most of the houses in Karrinyup are relatively modern, though the prolonged period of development has resulted in a range of styles from various eras. Many of the homes within the suburb are of two storeys and the vast majority are of brick and tile construction.

== Facilities ==
The Karrinyup Shopping Centre contains a bus station, community centre and library as well as two major department stores. It was built in 1973 with 54,587 m^{2} of retail accommodation with undercover and open-air parking. A major renovation was completed in 2021 when it expanded to 109,000 m^{2} of retail space including cinemas and a new dining precinct, making Karrinyup Shopping Centre the largest in suburban Perth. Apartment towers in the north-east of the complex are expected to be finished by 2027. The complex is owned by the superannuation fund UniSuper and managed by GPT.

Karrinyup has two golf courses, Hamersley (public) and Lake Karrinyup (private). Open spaces exist at Lake Karrinyup and at the south-west of the suburb. Karrinyup contains three state primary schools (Karrinyup, Deanmore and Newborough) and a private college, St Mary's Anglican Girls' School, founded in 1921 at West Perth and relocated to Karrinyup in 1961.

== Transport ==
Karrinyup is served by the Karrinyup bus station, located at the shopping centre, with Transperth bus routes 422, 423, 424 and 425 providing a link to Stirling railway station. A Transperth depot in the suburb is to be upgraded to operate electric buses in 2026.

=== Bus ===
==== Bus routes ====
- 422 Stirling station to Scarborough Beach bus station – serves Huntriss Road, Finnerty Street, Ramsay Street, Dean Street, Francis Avenue, Pascoe Street, Burroughs Road, Karrinyup bus station, Jeanes Road, Deanmore Road, Rinaldi Crescent, Rainer Street and Newborough Street
- 423 Stirling station to Warwick station – serves Huntriss Road, Karrinyup Road and Karrinyup bus station
- 424 Stirling station to Karrinyup bus station – serves North Beach Road and Karrinyup Road
- 425 Stirling station to Warwick station – serves Karrinyup Road, Karrinyup bus station, Milverton Avenue and North Beach Road

== Politics ==
Karrinyup is a reasonably affluent suburb with many "mortgage belt" families and socially liberal voters. It consistently supports the Liberal Party at both federal and state elections, although the part south of Karrinyup Road leans more towards the Australian Labor Party.

Summary of the Karrinyup voting poll results
Election year	Candidates	Party	Votes	%	Swing (%)
2022 federal election	Celia Hammond	Liberal	639	39.11	-18.01
2022 federal election	Kate Chaney	Independent	436	26.68	+26.68
2022 federal election	Yannick Spencer	Labor	266	16.28	-7.60
2022 federal election	Cameron Pidgeon	The Greens (WA)	186	11.38	-2.03
2022 federal election	Dale Marie Grillo	Pauline Hanson's One Nation	37	2.26	+0.49
2022 federal election	Ladeisha Louise Verhoeff	United Australia Party	33	2.02	+0.95
2022 federal election	Judith Cullity	Australian Federation Party	21	1.29	+1.29
2022 federal election	Bill Burn	Western Australia Party	16	0.98	-0.60
2019 federal election	Vince Connelly	Liberal	1,227	57.12	-4.35
2019 federal election	Melita Markey	Australian Labor Party	513	23.88	+3.47
2019 federal election	Judith Cullity	The Greens (WA)	288	13.41	+0.34
2019 federal election	Angus Young	Pauline Hanson's One Nation	38	1.77	+1.77
2019 federal election	Elizabeth Re	Western Australia Party	34	1.58	+1.58
2019 federal election	Kevin Host	Australian Christians	25	1.16	-1.27
2019 federal election	Dorothy Hutton	United Australia Party	23	1.07	+1.07
2016 federal election	Michael Keenan	Liberal	1,364	61.47	+1.09
2016 federal election	Robert Pearson	Australian Labor Party	453	20.41	-0.81
2016 federal election	Tom Webster	The Greens (WA)	290	13.07	+1.11
2016 federal election	Kevin Host	Australian Christians	54	2.43	+0.70
2016 federal election	Kim Mubarak	Independent	33	1.49	+0.26
2016 federal election	Alison L Rowe	Rise Up Australia Party	25	1.13	+0.63
2013 federal election	Michael Keenan	Liberal	1,323	60.38	+2.76
2013 federal election	Dan Caddy	Labor	465	21.22	-5.85
2013 federal election	Tim Clifford	The Greens (WA)	262	11.96	+0.50
2013 federal election	Kevin Host	Australian Christians	38	1.73	+1.73
2013 federal election	Wayne Gordon Thompson	Palmer United Party	62	2.83	+2.83
2013 federal election	Kim Mubarak	Independent	27	1.23	+1.23
2013 federal election	Alison Rowe	Rise Up Australia Party	11	0.50	+0.50
2013 federal election	Matueny Marial Luke	Family First Party	3	0.14	-0.21
2010 federal election	Michael Keenan	Liberal	1,305	57.46	+1.33
2010 federal election	Louise Durack	Labor	617	27.17	-5.33
2010 federal election	Chris Martin	The Greens (WA)	261	11.49	+2.93
2010 federal election	Elizabeth Re	Independent	45	1.98	+1.98
2010 federal election	Jenny Whately	Christian Democratic Party	35	1.54	+0.39
2010 federal election	Peter Clifford	Family First	8	0.35	-0.25
2007 federal election	Michael Keenan	Liberal	1,326	56.16	-2.17
2007 federal election	Peter Tinley	Labor	767	32.49	+2.79
2007 federal election	Tamara Desiatov	The Greens	202	8.56	+1.20
2007 federal election	Ray Moran	Christian Democratic Party	27	1.14	-0.68
2007 federal election	Symia Hopkinson	Family First	14	0.59	+0.59
2007 federal election	Denise Hynd	What Women Want (Australia)	10	0.42	+0.42
2007 federal election	Sam Ward	LDP	7	0.30	+0.30
2007 federal election	Alex Patrick	One Nation	6	0.25	-0.24
2004 federal election	Michael Keenan	Liberal	1,316	58.33	+4.08
2004 federal election	Jann McFarlane	Labor	670	29.70	+0.94
2004 federal election	Katrina Bercov	The Greens	166	7.36	+1.96
2004 federal election	Ray Moran	CDP Christian Party	41	1.82	+0.55
2004 federal election	Giuseppe Coletti	Australian Democrats	31	1.37	-4.62
2004 federal election	Marcus Anderson	Independent	18	0.80	+0.80
2004 federal election	Leone Pearson	Citizens Electoral Council	3	0.13	+0.13
2004 federal election	Alex K Patrick	Pauline Hanson's One Nation	11	0.49	-2.57
2022 Source: AEC - House of Representatives, Division of Stirling - First Preferences 2019 Source: AEC - House of Representatives, Division of Stirling - First Preferences 2016 Source: AEC - House of Representatives, Division of Stirling - First Preferences 2013 Source: AEC - House of Representatives, Division of Stirling - First Preferences 2010 Source: AEC - House of Representatives, Division of Stirling - First Preferences 2007 Source: AEC - House of Representatives, Division of Stirling - First Preferences 2004 Source: AEC - House of Representatives, Division of Stirling - First Preferences

== Notable residents ==
- Peter Dowding, former Premier of Western Australia (1988 to 1990)
- Dennis Lillee, former Australian cricketer
- Emma Matthews, soprano
- Jeff Newman, former television presenter
- Tim Winton, novelist and National Living Treasure, grew up in Gwelup Street
