= West Coast Highway, Perth =

Highway in Perth, Western Australia

West Coast Highway Western Australia
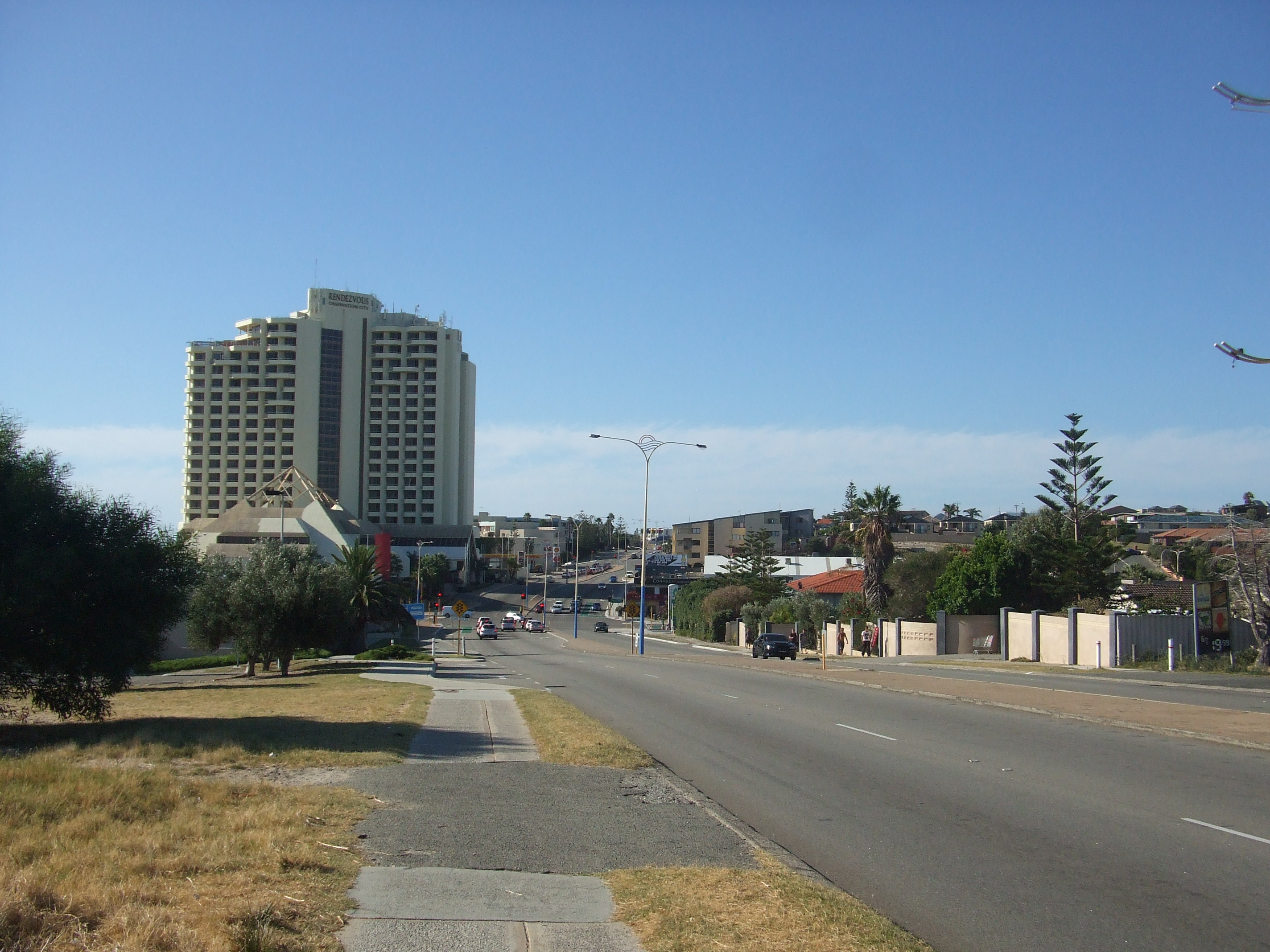
- View northbound approaching Scarborough

General information
- Type: Highway
- Length: 13 km (8.1 mi)
- Opened: 1960s
- Route number(s): State Route 71 (all sections)
- Tourist routes: Tourist Drive 204 (Swanbourne to Oceanic Drive, City Beach and Challenger Parade, City Beach to Trigg)

Major junctions
- South end: Curtin Avenue (State Route 71), Swanbourne
- Rochdale Road (State Route 65); Oceanic Drive; The Boulevard (State Route 72); Scarborough Beach Road (State Route 75); Karrinyup Road (State Route 76 / Tourist Drive 204)
- North end: Marmion Avenue (State Route 71), Trigg

Location(s)
- Major suburbs: City Beach, Scarborough

Highway system
- Highways in Australia; National Highway • Freeways in Australia; Highways in Western Australia

West Coast Highway is an arterial coastal highway located in the western and inner northern suburbs of Perth, Western Australia. It is part of State Route 71, and also Tourist Drive 204 in various coastal parts.

The highway commences from the end of Curtin Avenue at Swanbourne and heads north, via the SAS Campbell Barracks and rifle range, to City Beach, Scarborough and Trigg, terminating at the Karrinyup Road intersection, where it becomes Marmion Avenue. It links the northern coastal suburbs of Perth with the city of Fremantle. The speed limit for the majority of the highway is 70 km/h with two small 60 and 80 km/h sections at the Scarborough end. The highway is a dual carriageway for most of its length.

== History ==
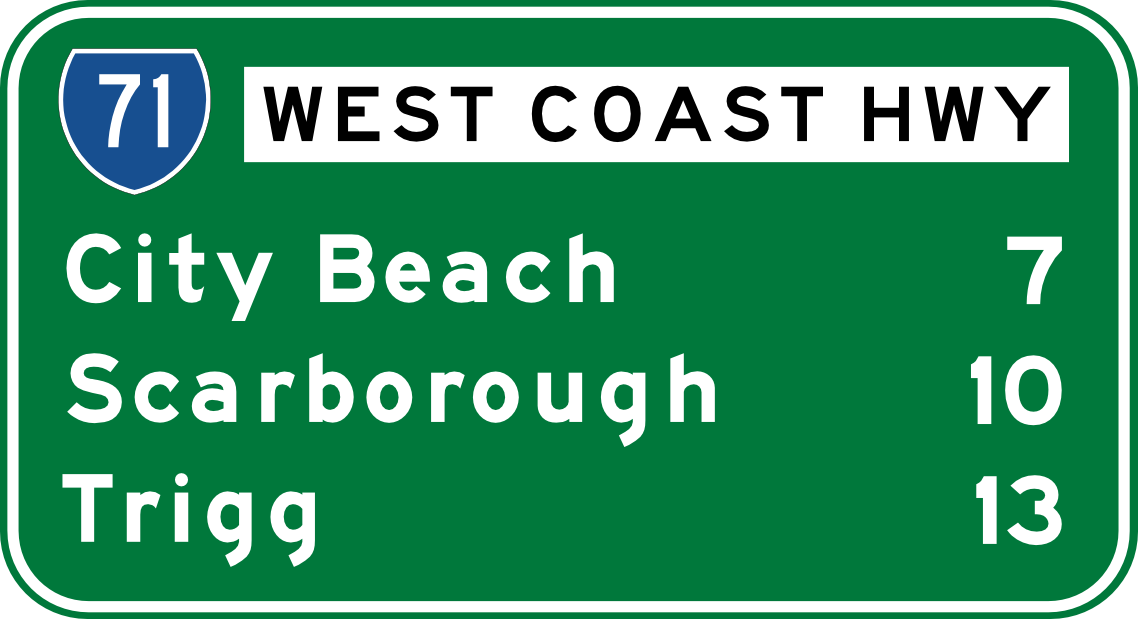
Approximate road distances (in kilometres) of coastal suburbs from Swanbourne onwards.

The highway began life as a minor coastal road (called Coast Road) between Swanbourne and North Beach in the 1940s. Prior to this time, the only access to settlements such as North Beach and Mullaloo had been by gravel road from Wanneroo Road. In the late 1960s, it was significantly upgraded and extended to Mullaloo Beach.

In the mid 1970s, the section through City Beach was redesigned, seeing the former Challenger Drive (inland) and West Coast Highway (coastal) trading names and the new highway being dualled as far north as Scarborough. The southernmost section running through Swanbourne was renamed Rochdale Road. In 1984, the highway was extended north to Ocean Reef Road.

By this stage, Marmion Avenue had supplanted the highway as the major road servicing the new northern suburbs, and suburban Swanbourne was struggling to cope with the through-traffic. In 1985–86, immediately preceding the designation of the State Route system, the highway immediately north of Scarborough was diverted inland along its present route to join Marmion Avenue at Karrinyup Road, and the highway south of City Beach was rerouted into Servetus Street, Swanbourne.

The northern two-thirds of the highway was divided up and renamed:

- West Coast Drive from Trigg to Hepburn Avenue and Hillarys Boat Harbour;
- Whitfords Avenue to Whitfords Avenue (east-west);
- Northshore Drive to Mullaloo Drive; and
- Oceanside Promenade to Ocean Reef Road.

Apart from the section in Scarborough, all of these sections were continuous.

By 2000, Servetus Street had become as much of a bottleneck as Rochdale Road had prior to 1985. A new extension to West Coast Highway, cut into the ground to reduce noise for local residents, was completed immediately next to Servetus Street, which was reduced to a local road. Curtin Avenue (leading to Fremantle) was also upgraded.

== Major intersections ==
All intersections below are controlled by traffic signals unless otherwise mentioned.

LGA	Location	km	mi	Destinations	Notes
Cottesloe–Nedlands boundary	Cottesloe–Swanbourne boundary	0	0.0	Curtin Avenue (State Route 71) south – Mosman Park, North Fremantle / Claremont Crescent east – Claremont, Karrakatta	Southern terminus. Continues as Curtin Avenue southwards to connect with Stirling Highway (State Route 5) via Eric Street
Cottesloe–Nedlands boundary	Cottesloe–Swanbourne boundary	0.2	0.12	North Street (Tourist Drive 204)	Connection to Servetus Street. Tourist Drive 204's (Sunset Coast Tourist Drive) southern section ends here.
Nedlands	Swanbourne	1.4	0.87	Alfred Road east – Mount Claremont, Karrakatta / Campbell Barracks access road west	
Cambridge	Mount Claremont–City Beach boundary	3.3	2.1	Rochdale Road (State Route 65) – Subiaco, Perth	Non-signalised intersection.
Cambridge	City Beach	3.7	2.3	Challenger Parade (Tourist Drive 204)	Non-signalised intersection. Tourist Drive 204's (Sunset Coast Tourist Drive) northern section commences here.
Cambridge	City Beach	5.1	3.2	Oceanic Drive – Floreat, West Leederville	
Cambridge	City Beach	6.2	3.9	Challenger Parade (Tourist Drive 204)	Non-signalised intersection. Tourist Drive 204's (Sunset Coast Tourist Drive) southern concurrency terminus.
Cambridge	City Beach	6.6	4.1	The Boulevard (State Route 72) – Floreat, Wembley	
Cambridge	City Beach	8.1	5.0	Hale Road – Wembley Downs, Churchlands	
Stirling	Scarborough	9.8	6.1	Brighton Road	
Stirling	Scarborough	10.2	6.3	Scarborough Beach Road (State Route 75) – Innaloo, Osborne Park, North Perth	
Stirling	Scarborough	10.5	6.5	Manning Street	
Stirling	Trigg	11.9	7.4	West Coast Drive – Watermans Bay, Sorrento, Hillarys	No access from West Coast Drive to West Coast Highway
Stirling	Trigg–Karrinyup boundary	13.1	8.1	Marmion Avenue (State Route 71) – Marmion, Hillarys, Clarkson, Yanchep north / Karrinyup Road (State Route 76 / Tourist Drive 204 west) – Stirling, Morley, Eden Hill	Northern terminus. Continues as Marmion Avenue northwards. Tourist Drive 204's (Sunset Coast Tourist Drive) northern concurrency terminus.
1.000 mi = 1.609 km; 1.000 km = 0.621 mi: Concurrency terminus; Incomplete access; Note: Intersections with minor local roads are not shown

== See also ==
- Highways in Australia
- List of highways in Western Australia
