= Innaloo, Western Australia =

Innaloo
- Suburb
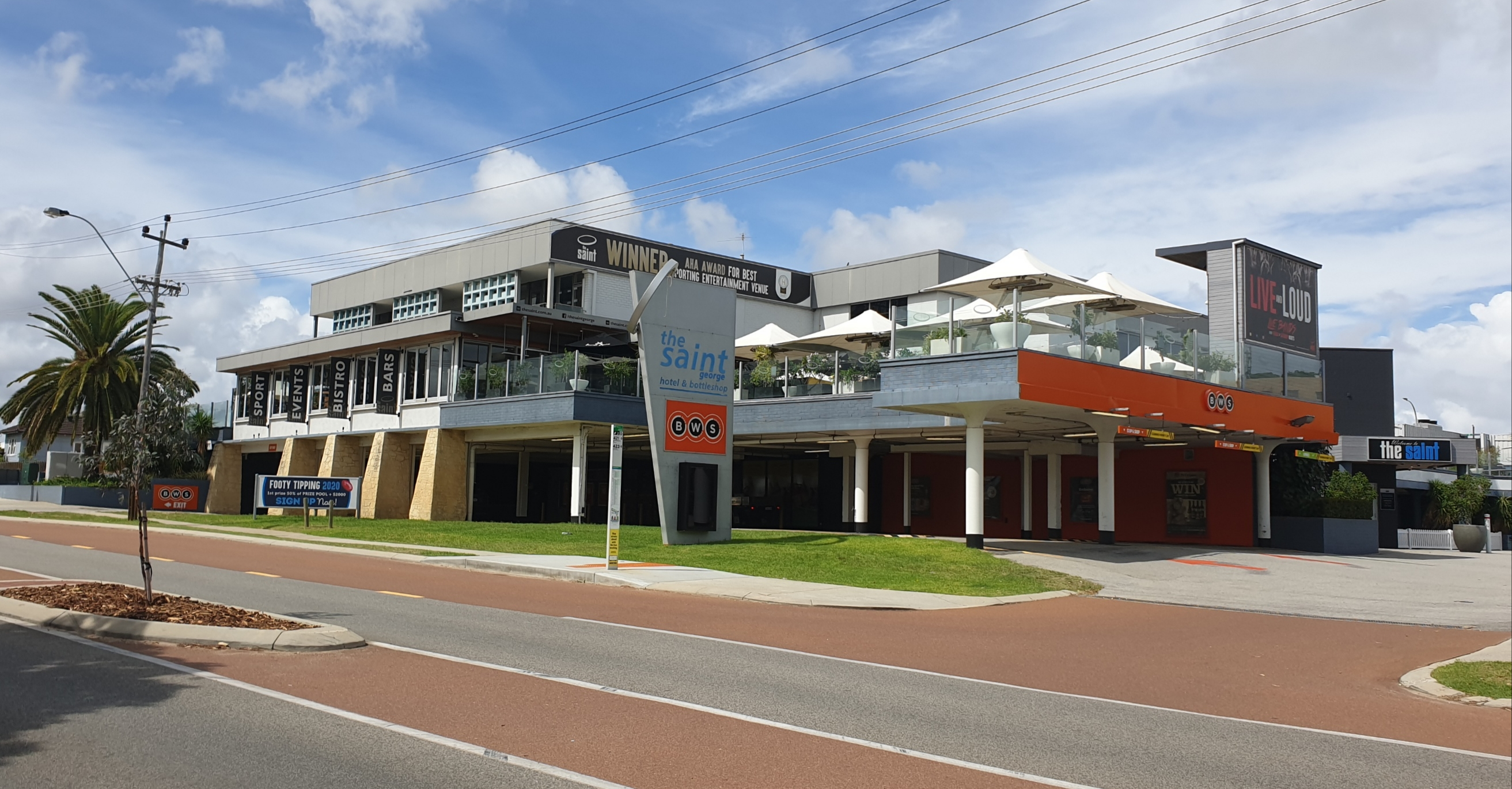
- Saint George Hotel, Barnes Street, Innaloo
- Interactive map of Innaloo
- Coordinates: 31.894°S 115.791°E
- Country: Australia
- State: Western Australia
- City: Perth
- LGA: City of Stirling
- Location: 9 km (5.6 mi) NNE of Perth CBD
- Established: 1950s

Government
  - State electorate: Scarborough
  - Federal division: Curtin

Area
  - Total: 3.0 km^{2} (1.2 sq mi)

Population
  - Total: 9,592 (SAL 2021)
- Postcode: 6018
Suburbs around Innaloo
Karrinyup	Gwelup	Stirling
Doubleview	Innaloo	Osborne Park
Wembley Downs	Woodlands	Herdsman

Innaloo is a suburb of Perth, the capital city of Western Australia, 9 km (5.6 mi) from Perth's central business district in the local government area of the City of Stirling.

Innaloo is an established residential suburb that is home to the Westfield Innaloo and Westfield Innaloo Megacentre shopping centres, and is adjacent to Perth's largest cinema complex, the 18-cinema Event Cinemas.

== Name ==
Innaloo was originally named Njookenbooroo (sometimes spelt Ngurgenboro, Noorgenbora or similar variants), believed to be derived from the local Noongar name for Herdsman Lake or a nearby wetland.

The spelling and pronunciation (e.g. "ny-ooken-borra") were deemed to be difficult to those unfamiliar with the name; in 1927, the local progress association asked welfare worker and anthropologist Daisy Bates to compile a list of possible alternative names, drawn from various Aboriginal languages. Bates' rendering of the personal name of a woman, "Innaloo" (from Dongara) was chosen.

Nevertheless, some local landmarks are still named "Nookenburra" – another variation of the original name.

The similarity of the name Innaloo to the phrase "in a loo" soon made the suburb the butt of many jokes. However, campaigns aimed at changing the name have failed to gain significant support.

== History ==
=== From settlement to suburb ===
Land near Innaloo was first granted to Thomas Mews in 1831. In 1898, Town Properties of WA subdivided the lands around Njookenbooroo Swamp for sale as market gardens, and drained the swamp into Herdsman Lake over the following years, digging channels through the area to facilitate agriculture. They offered rent-free lease of the lots, with an option to later purchase at £100 per hectare if the occupants cleared them and brought them into production. The area between Hertha Road, Oswald Street and King Edward Road and Herdsman Lake was gazetted as the Njookenbooroo Drainage District, and by 1912, local market gardeners were turning off 25 tonnes of produce each week.

The Njookenbooroo School on Odin Road (then called Government Road), linked to the city by a plank road, was built in 1915. Although subdivision for southern Innaloo was approved in 1916, by the 1920s only ten houses had been built, with the majority of the land used for grazing. Residential development accelerated during World War II, and in the 1950s, Metro-Goldwyn-Mayer (MGM) built a drive-in cinema in nearby Liege Street.

=== Development of modern Innaloo ===
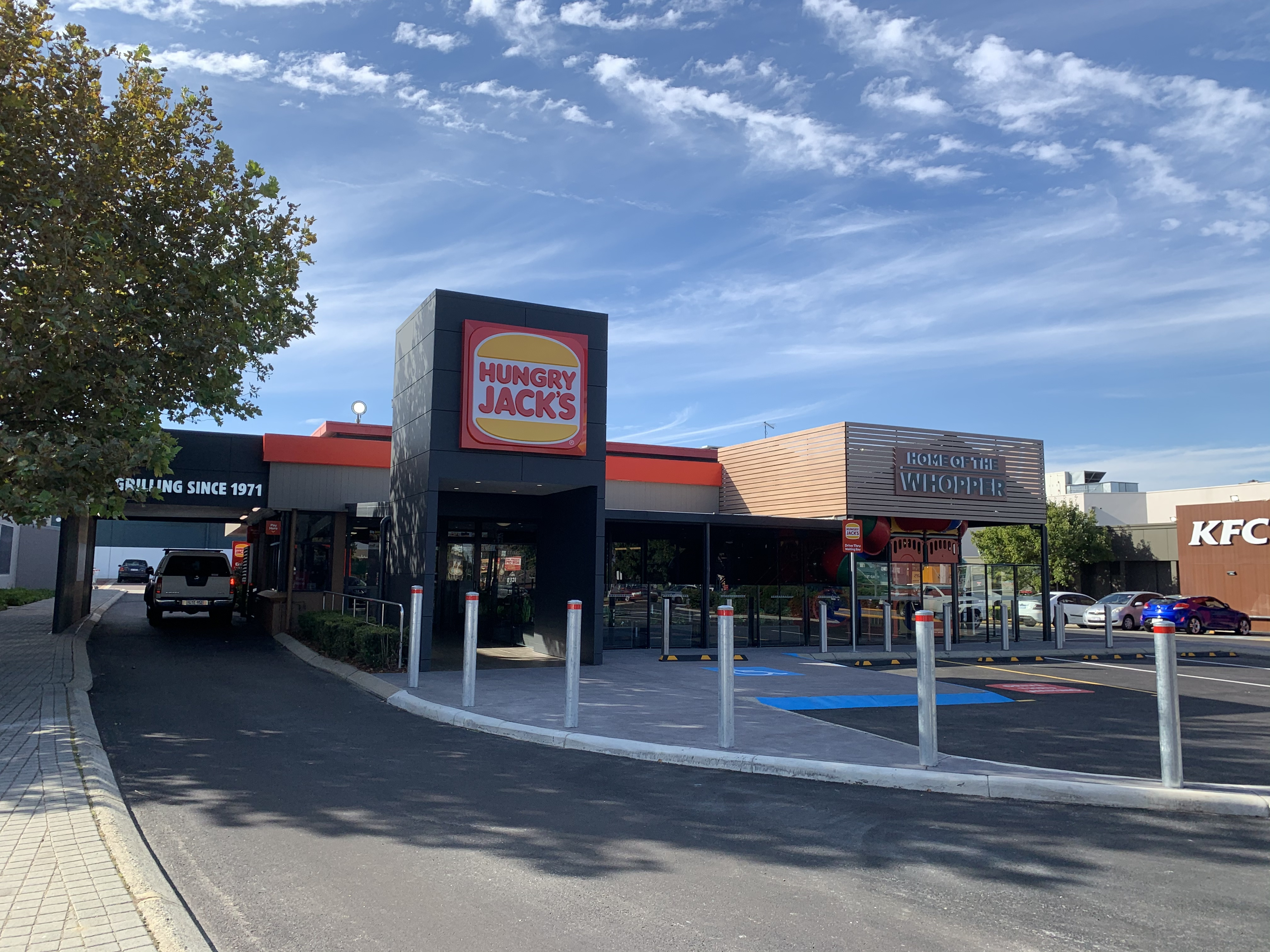
A Hungry Jack's restaurant in Innaloo, Western Australia

Development of the suburb was essentially complete by 1970, and its status increased due to its proximity to Scarborough Beach and the light industrial and commercial centre of Osborne Park, the building of the Nookenburra Hotel (1962) and shopping centre (1967) and the nearby civic centre in Hertha Road (1966).

Innaloo is also the home for the first Hungry Jack's in Australia since 1971.

The Mitchell Freeway was extended to Hutton Street in 1981 and to Karrinyup Road in 1984. The shopping centre also hosted the region's main bus station until the construction of Stirling bus/train interchange about a kilometre away in 1992. In 1999, Ellen Stirling Boulevard, named after the wife of the first governor of Western Australia, was constructed on land purchased from the last market gardeners in the area to replace the increasingly hazardous Oswald Street as the main through link between the freeway and the shopping areas.

== Geography ==
Innaloo is bounded by Karrinyup Road to the north, Huntriss Road to the west, Scarborough Beach Road to the south and Mitchell Freeway and the future line of Stephenson Avenue to the east. The majority of the suburb is residential, apart from the shopping areas in the south-east, several small parks and an undeveloped portion to the east of Ellen Stirling Boulevard. Some of the undeveloped area next to Stirling station has been developed as a commercial area centred on a new IKEA store.

At the 2006 census, Innaloo had a mostly middle-income population of 6,470 people. Most homes are single detached homes of timber-frame construction built around World War II, but some duplexes and recently built units also exist. A number of elderly homes including Geneff Village, named for Sorrento businessman and philanthropist George Geneff (who also built the Nookenburra Hotel), are located within the suburb.

== Facilities ==
Innaloo contains the Westfield Innaloo shopping centre. Next to Westfield Innaloo on Ellen Stirling Boulevard is the Westfield Innaloo Megacentre (acquired from Centro in August 2006), which contains 20 stores and a grocery. Across Scarborough Beach Road is the Event Cinemas megaplex. The northern part of the suburb also contains a small local shopping area in Morris Place. Opposite the Megacentre, an IKEA has been constructed, replacing the smaller store a kilometre away in the adjoining suburb of Osborne Park.

Innaloo's southern border with Woodlands hosts Perth's largest cinema complex, the 18-cinema Event Cinemas megaplex Innaloo, which contain cinemas as well as an arcade with numerous restaurants and dining speciality outlets and a game centre (centred on Timezone). It started off life as an MGM drive-in in the 1950s, then was rebuilt by Greater Union in 1990 with 8 screens, then expanded to a Megaplex - the first in Western Australia - in 1996. During the 2000s Greater Union was replaced with Event Cinemas.

== Transport ==
Innaloo is served by bus links to Stirling train station on the Yanchep line, including the 410, 412, 421, 424 and the 998/999 CircleRoute, and the 423 and 425 along the Karrinyup Road boundary. Additionally, the 990 services link Scarborough and the Glendalough railway station along Innaloo's southern boundary.

Prior to the construction of the Stirling railway station as part of the Northern Suburbs Transit System, a possible deviation of the rail alignment was considered to directly service the suburb and its shopping district including Westfield Innaloo. However, this idea was rejected by both the project and the public at large due to the significant cost, lack of identifiable benefits, and environmental impact grounds.

=== Bus ===
- 402 Perth Busport to Stirling Station via Main Street and Loftus Street
- 403 Perth Busport to Stirling Station via Royal Street and Loftus Street
- 410 Karrinyup Bus Station to Stirling Station via Scarborough Beach Road
- 412 Karrinyup Bus Station to Stirling Station via Scarborough Beach Road
- 413 Stirling Station to Glendalough Station via Osborne Park
- 414 Stirling Station to Glendalough Station via Balcatta
- 415 Stirling Station to Mirrabooka Bus Station via Amelia Street
- 420 Surf CAT Stirling Station to Scarborough Beach Bus Station
- 421 Stirling Station to Scarborough Beach Bus Station via Sackville Terrace
- 422 Stirling Station to Scarborough Beach Bus Station via Huntriss Road and Karrinyup Bus Station
- 423 Stirling Station to Warwick Station via Karrinyup Bus Station and Hillarys Boat Harbour
- 424 Stirling Station to Karrinyup Bus Station via North Beach Road and Gwelup
- 425 Stirling Station to Warwick Station via Karrinyup Bus Station and Carine
- 427 Stirling Station to Warwick Station via North Beach Road and Erindale Road
- 428 Stirling Station to Warwick Station via Balcatta
- 998 CircleRoute Clockwise
- 999 CircleRoute Anti-Clockwise

=== Rail ===
- Yanchep line
  - Stirling Station

== Politics ==
Innaloo is a mixed-wealth suburb with many "mortgage belt" families, as well as many elderly voters. The Yuluma booth is among the northern suburbs' few genuinely marginal booths at federal level. However, they strongly support the Australian Labor Party at state elections.

== Education ==
Innaloo is located within the intake area for Balcatta Senior High School. Students north of Barnes Road may optionally go to Carine Senior High School, and students south of Barnes Road may optionally go to Churchlands Senior High School.

Innaloo contains two primary schools. Yuluma Primary School is a state school located at 21 Ambrose Street. St Dominic's Primary School is a Catholic school located at 95 Beatrice Street.
