= Karrinyup Road =

Road in Perth, Western Australia

Karrinyup Road Western Australia
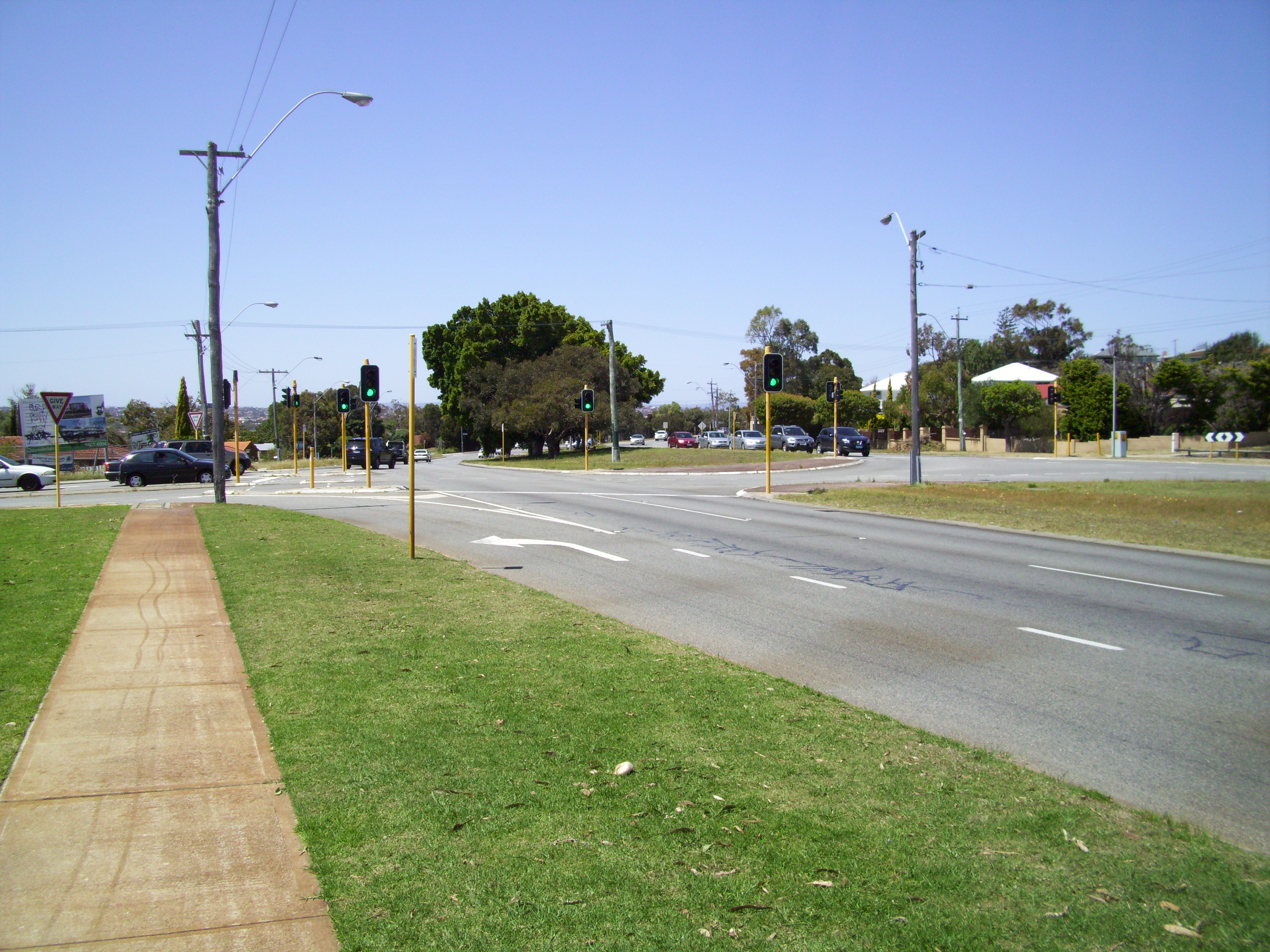
- Looking east towards Francis Avenue in Karrinyup

General information
- Type: Highway
- Length: 8.0 km (5.0 mi)
- Opened: 1950s
- Route number(s): State Route 76 (Karrinyup – Balcatta)
- Tourist routes: Tourist Drive 204 (Trigg)

Major junctions
- West end: West Coast Drive (Tourist Drive 204), Trigg
- Marmion Avenue (State Route 71); West Coast Highway (State Route 71 / Tourist Drive 204); Mitchell Freeway (State Route 2); Cedric Street (State Route 64)
- East end: Morley Drive (State Route 76), Balcatta

Location(s)
- Major suburbs: Karrinyup, Stirling

Highway system
- Highways in Australia; National Highway • Freeways in Australia; Highways in Western Australia

Karrinyup Road is a major east–west arterial road in the inner northern suburbs of Perth, Western Australia, connecting the City of Stirling council offices, Osborne Park Hospital and Karrinyup Shopping Centre with residential estates in Innaloo, Stirling and Balcatta.

== Route description ==
Karrinyup Road is part of State Route 76 for most of its length, east of West Coast Highway, and part of Tourist Drive 204 for the remaining section in Trigg. The speed limit is mostly 70 kilometres per hour (43 mph), though it is 60 kilometres per hour (37 mph) within the vicinity of the Karrinyup Shopping Centre and Trigg. Main Roads Western Australia controls and maintains Karrinyup Road, and is part of Main Roads' internal designation H28 Karrinyup–Morley Highway, along with Morley Drive.

Karrinyup Road commences in Trigg at a roundabout with West Coast Drive, assuming Tourist Drive 204 which continues along West Coast Drive northwards. After 1.1 kilometres (0.68 mi) the road reaches a traffic light intersection at Marmion Avenue (north) and West Coast Highway (south), at which point Tourist Drive 204 turns southbound on West Coast Highway, and Karrinyup Road gains the State Route 76 allocation. 1.2 kilometres (0.75 mi) later Karrinyup Road intersects with Jeanes Road as well as the entrance to the Karrinyup Shopping Centre. The road then travels along the vicinity of the shopping centre and Karrinyup bus station before reaching Francis Avenue 500 metres (1,600 ft) later. Karrinyup Road reaches Huntriss Road 750 metres (2,460 ft) later, and then, within the suburb of Gwelup, North Beach Road 850 metres (2,790 ft) later. Another 350 metres (1,150 ft) takes the road to the Mitchell Freeway, which it crosses over for 140 metres (460 ft).

Following the Mitchell Freeway interchange, Karrinyup Road is within the suburb of Stirling. After providing access to the Osborne Park Hospital the road reaches Cedric Street 950 metres (3,120 ft) later. 350 metres (1,150 ft) the road reaches Jones Street, and then another 750 metres (2,460 ft) takes the road to Grindleford Drive and San Remo Boulevard. Karrinyup Road reaches Main Street in Balcatta 800 metres (2,600 ft), at which point it continues east as Morley Drive.

== History ==
The road, especially the portion between the Mitchell Freeway and Main Street, was one of the first roads in the area, known as Balcatta Beach Road and later as North Beach Road. Until the 1990s, most of this stretch of the road was still fledged by functioning market gardens.

For part of 1984, Karrinyup Road represented the northern terminus of the Mitchell Freeway. Prior to the freeway's construction, this location was the intersection of Odin Road between Innaloo and the Balcatta industrial area.

From 2019 to 2021, to coincide with the extensive renovation of the Karrinyup Shopping Centre, roadworks occurred on Karrinyup Road between the Mitchell Freeway and Marmion Avenue, including the addition of bus lanes within the vicinity of the shopping centre, relocation of Karrinyup bus station, and intersection upgrades of Jeanes Road, Francis Avenue, and Huntriss Road.

== Major intersections ==
The entire length of Karrinyup Road falls within the City of Stirling, with all intersections controlled by traffic lights unless otherwise indicated.

Location	km	mi	Destinations	Notes
Trigg	0	0.0	West Coast Drive (Tourist Drive 204) – North Beach, Watermans Bay, Hillarys	Western terminus at roundabout. State Route 76 western terminus. Tourist Drive 204 (Sunset Coast Tourist Drive) western concurrency terminus
Trigg–Karrinyup boundary	1.2	0.75	Marmion Avenue (State Route 71) north / West Coast Highway (State Route 71 / Tourist Drive 204) south – Yanchep, Ocean Reef, Scarborough, Cottesloe	Tourist Drive 204 (Sunset Coast Tourist Drive) eastern concurrency terminus
Karrinyup	2.3	1.4	Jeanes Road	Access to Karrinyup Shopping Centre
Karrinyup	2.8	1.7	Francis Avenue	Access to Karrinyup Shopping Centre
Karrinyup–Gwelup–Innaloo tripoint	3.5	2.2	Huntriss Road – Doubleview	
Gwelup–Innaloo boundary	4.4	2.7	North Beach Road – Balcatta	
Gwelup–Stirling–Innaloo tripoint	4.9	3.0	Mitchell Freeway (State Route 2) – Butler, Joondalup, Perth, Rockingham	The entrance and exit ramps south of Karrinyup Road merge with interchanges further south, requiring traffic to weave
Stirling	5.9	3.7	Cedric Street (State Route 64) – Innaloo, Osborne Park, Balcatta	
Stirling–Balcatta boundary	6.9	4.3	Grindleford Drive north / San Remo Boulevard south	
Balcatta–Tuart Hill boundary	8.0	5.0	Main Street – Westminster, Osborne Park, Mount Hawthorn	Eastern terminus, continues as Morley Drive (State Route 76) eastbound
1.000 mi = 1.609 km; 1.000 km = 0.621 mi: Concurrency terminus; Note: Intersections with minor local roads are not shown
