= List of State Register of Heritage Places in the City of Stirling =

The State Register of Heritage Places is maintained by the Heritage Council of Western Australia. As of 2026, 645 places are heritage-listed in the City of Stirling, of which 20 are on the State Register of Heritage Places.

== List ==
The Western Australian State Register of Heritage Places, as of 2026, lists the following 22 state registered places within the City of Stirling:

Place name	Place #	Street number & name	Suburb or town	Co-ordinates	Notes & former names	Photo
Beach House, Trigg Island	2150	352 West Coast Drive	Trigg	31.876404°S 115.752653°E		
Astor Theatre	2425	659 Beaufort Street	Mount Lawley	31.934086°S 115.872058°E	Lyceum Theatre, State Theatre, Astor Cinema	
Chapel of St Michael and All Angels	2430	31 Lawley Crescent	Mount Lawley	31.931299°S 115.875820°E	Perth College Chapel	
Windsor Hall	3320	36 Queens Crescent	Mount Lawley	31.932316°S 115.875416°E		
Cottage, Old Balcatta Road	3442	139 Balcatta Road	Balcatta	31.858323°S 115.793990°E	Daviot Park, Bestry Cottage, Duffy Cottage	
Herdsman Lake Settlers Cottage	3464	180 Pearson Street	Churchlands	31.918868°S 115.794484°E	Gava Cottage	
Mount Lawley Tennis Club	4252	Rookwood Street	Mount Lawley	31.931021°S 115.870555°E		
Beaucott Building	6185	654 Beaufort Street	Mount Lawley	31.934425°S 115.872445°E		
Inglewood Police Station	6655	867 Beaufort Street	Inglewood	31.922180°S 115.884556°E		
Annesley	8035	49-51 Lawley Crescent	Mount Lawley	31.929597°S 115.873497°E	Annesley Nursing Home, Annesley Rest Home, Annesley Private Hospital	
Osborne Primary School	8802	155 Albert Street	Osborne Park	31.899591°S 115.825373°E		
Balcatta Senior High School	9812	31 Poincaire Street	Balcatta	31.875556°S 115.812778°E	Balcatta High School	
Cooinda House, Mount Lawley	9818	24 Queens Crescent	Mount Lawley	31.932626°S 115.876908°E	Cooinda Education an Employment Hostel, Cooinda Hostel for Aboriginal Girls	
Briggs Kiln Carine	9842	Reid Highway	Carine	31.857305°S 115.796101°E	Old Lime Kiln	
Marsala House, Dianella	9917	38 Sycamore Rise	Dianella	31.880480°S 115.864531°E	Dianella's Disco House	
Hale School Memorial Hall	9957	20 Unwin Avenue	Wembley Downs	31.912425°S 115.78036282°E	Part of Hale School	
Chapel of St Mark	9958	20 Unwin Avenue	Wembley Downs	31.9140°S 115.7820°E	Part of Hale School	
Memorial Gardens & Recreation Reserve, Mount Lawley	14769	Lot 6 Queens Crescent	Mount Lawley	31.931080°S 115.870929°E	Mount Lawley Bowling Club & War Memorial, Mount Lawley Tennis Club, Mount Lawley Croquet Club	
War Memorial	16608	Corner Clifton & Queens Crescent	Mount Lawley	31.930233°S 115.870801°E		
Scarborough Clock Tower	16764	Intersection The Esplanade & Scarborough Beach Road	Scarborough	31.894404°S 115.756257°E	The Rotary Clock Tower of Scarborough Beach	
Inglewood Police Quarters	19453	867 Beaufort Street	Inglewood	31.922180°S 115.884556°E		
Inglewood Police Station & Police Quarters (former)	19833	867 Beaufort Street	Inglewood	31.922180°S 115.884556°E		
