= Karrinyup Shopping Centre =

Shopping centre in Perth, Western Australia

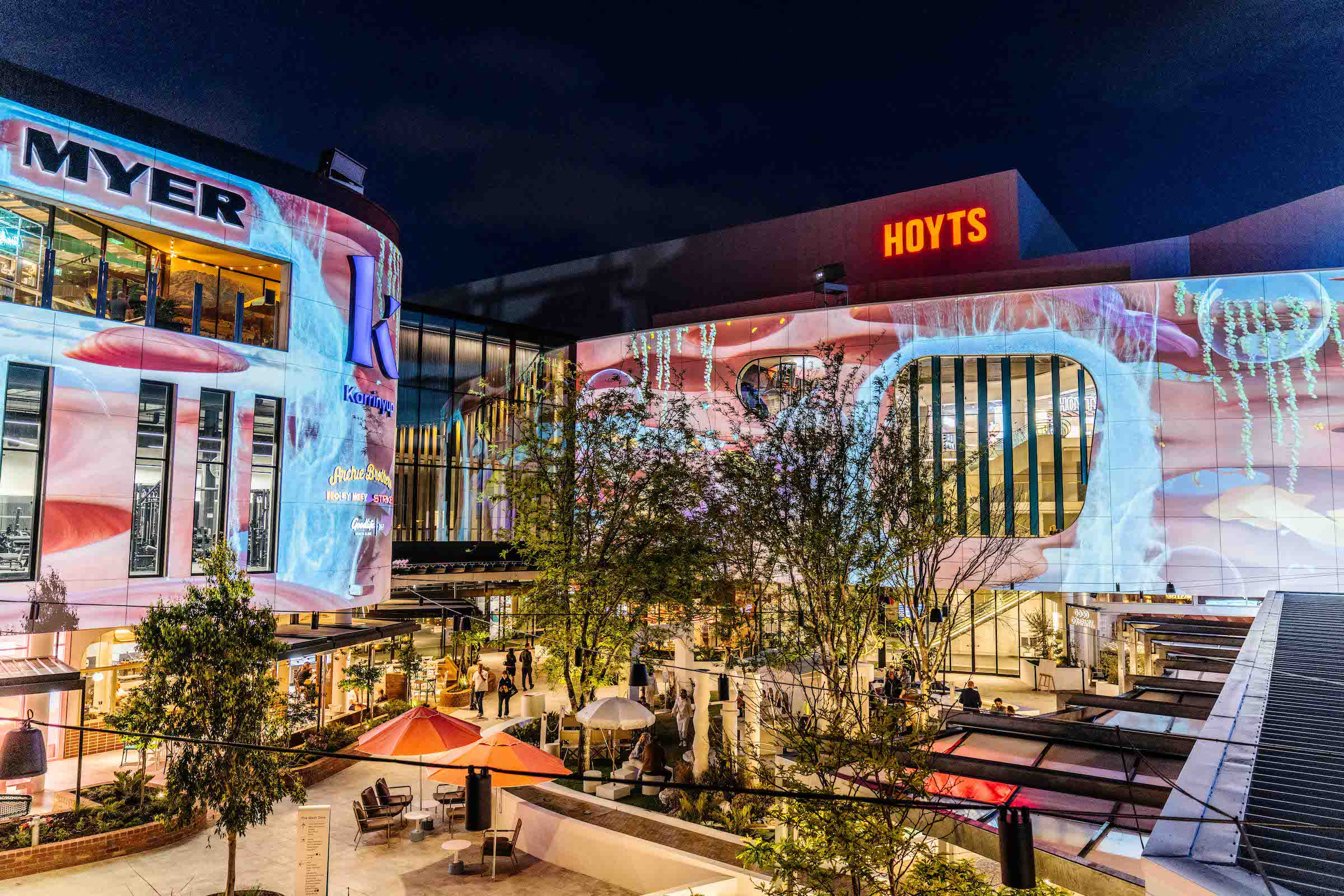
- The West Deck
- Location: Karrinyup, Western Australia, Australia
- Coordinates: 31°52′37″S 115°46′46″E
- Opened: 17 September 1973
- Developer: St Martins Properties
- Manager: GPT Group
- Owner: UniSuper
- Num. of stores: 300
- Num. of anchor tenants: 7
- Floor area: 109,000 m^{2} (1,170,000 sq ft)
- Floors: 3 (Plus 2 basement floors for parking)
- Parking: 4,650 bays
- Website: www.karrinyupcentre.com.au

Karrinyup Shopping Centre is a shopping centre built in 1973 in Karrinyup, a suburb of Perth. The centre is one of the largest shopping centres in Western Australia.

== History ==
Prior to the current centre being built, a smaller Karrinyup Shopping Centre was constructed in 1964 on a 0.2-hectare (0.5-acre) corner site (Karrinyup Lot 450) bounded by Francis Avenue and Karrinyup Avenue, on a five year lease from the Lands Department). This was built as the precursor to a larger centre expected to be constructed in the future. The original centre was constructed by LJ Wallis of Osborne Park and owned by Karrinyup Investments of Scarborough. Valued at £A 12,500 in 1964, equivalent to A$394,100 in 2022, it consisted of a grocer, greengrocer, deli, butcher, chemist, hairdresser, draper, news agent, post office, bank agency, and parking for 100 cars.

During the latter part of the 1960s, the Metropolitan Regional Planning Authority developed the Corridor Plan for Perth, which was published and adopted in 1970. The plan called for the creation of five "sub-regional" retail centres (Fremantle, Joondalup, Midland, Armadale and Rockingham) that would form the commercial and economic focus of each "node", and take the retail burden away from the central business district. The plan was not endorsed by Parliament until 1973, by which time Morley Shopping Centre had expanded twice (in 1970 and 1973), and Karrinyup was one of three new shopping centres that were completed in "middle-distance" suburbs, locations outside the designated corridors; the other two were Westfield Carousel at Cannington and Garden City, Booragoon, established a year earlier in 1972.

Construction of the larger Karrinyup Shopping Centre began in April 1972, and on completion was expected by its developers, St Martins Properties, to become the biggest shopping centre in the state. The centre consisted of a number of features including grade separated access from the car parks to the centre over the main vehicle routes to reduce driver confusion, 11.3-metre-wide (37 ft) malls of terrazzo flooring, natural light provided through diffused roof lanterns, and enclosed air conditioned malls, the latter being considered unusual at the time by the local press. Construction of the centre was expected to be completed in September 1973.

Designed by architectural firm Cameron, Chisholm Nicol, the newer and larger centre on the 15-hectare (37-acre) site was designed to include:

- Myer, 13,935 square metres (149,995 sq ft)
- David Jones, 9,290 square metres (99,997 sq ft)
- Walsh's menswear store, 929 square metres (10,000 sq ft)
- Woolworths, 2,787 square metres (29,999 sq ft)
- 6,039 square metres (65,003 sq ft) of space for 70 speciality shops
- 3,000 parking bays
- Food hall
- Bus transit station
- Room for a future community centre and hotel to be included in the complex

At the time of its proposal, it was originally expected to serve some 100,000 residents within its catchment area. By 1970, projections performed on behalf of the centre owners by PA Consulting had increased this projected catchment area to 250,000. Projected spending within this catchment area was estimated at A$188 million (1970), increasing to a catchment of 500,000 and projected spending of $376 million by 1982.

The centre officially opened on Monday 17 September 1973 at 9:10 am. The opening however did not go without incident, with all lighting within the centre failing one minute before opening time. This issue was rectified and lighting was restored at 9:11 am. Over 100,000 people visited the centre on its first day, with all 3,000 parking bays at the centre being filled by 9:45 am.

Upon its completion, it was the largest regional shopping centre in the state and only three of the centre's tenancies comprising 380 square metres (4,090 sq ft) of GLA were vacant.

The City of Stirling library planned for the centre was opened one year later.

In order to grow both the five "sub-regional" retail centres and these off-corridor regional shopping centres, a Retail Shopping Policy was developed by the MRPA in 1976, and a Perth Metropolitan Region Retail Structure Plan was put in place to regulate the industry. This plan was amended as new centres were required. Under this regulatory control, extensions to the shopping centre occurred in 1982 and 1987, bringing the gross leasable area to 43,607 square metres (469,380 sq ft) in 1996. A review of the Corridor Plan in 1987 found that the sub-regional centres had failed to adequately compete against the regional shopping centres in the middle-distance suburbs.

If they start it in this shopping centre it may spread to others

— Comment by local shopper Max Kennedy on the smoking ban, Stirling Times

In November 1991, Karrinyup was the first shopping centre in the state to implement a total ban on smoking inside the centre. It was reported in the Stirling Times that other centres had praised the concept despite tenants of the centre being concerned that the ban was an infringement on people's rights.

=== 1981 redevelopment ===
In 1981, construction commenced on a small redevelopment. This would include an expansion to the eastern side of the mall, as well as a Big W Discount department store. The redevelopment opened the same year.

=== 1996 redevelopment ===
During 1997, major works commenced to provide a significant upgrade to the centre. Initially valued at $95.3 million (1997), the redevelopment on completion expanded leasable floor area to 54,400 square metres (586,000 sq ft) and included:

- Expansion of existing supermarket space by 1,400 square metres (15,000 sq ft)
- Addition of a second story, then known as the Boulevarde, to the main east–west mall axis
- 6,000 square metres (65,000 sq ft) of additional floor space for 60 new speciality outlets
- A new north-east to south-west mall on the northern edge of the site
- 500 seat food court
- 800 additional parking bays, by construction of two new multi-story carparks, one on the southern frontage, and another on the north-east perimeter.

At the same time, major anchor tenant Myer undertook significant refurbishments to their store, including interior improvements and the addition of an in-store cafe.

The first stage of renovations was completed in November 1996, with the opening of the western end of the Boulevard and the south-west parking deck. Construction of the second stage was expected to commence in February 1997. Based on plans at the time, on completion of the redevelopment, Karrinyup would be the third largest shopping centre in Perth, behind the Galleria and Whitford City. By this point, 25% of available retail space in the redeveloped areas was already leased.

Renovations to the centre were completed in June 1998, with the official opening taking place on 29 September 1998. At the time of its official opening, the centre was running at 92% occupancy, with maximum average rent in 1998 of A$1013 per 1 square metre (11 sq ft). By November 1998, the occupancy rate for the centre was up to 98%. Occupancy rates had reached 100% by March 1999, and in the prior three months the centre recorded a 34% increase in moving annual turnover, increasing to A$222 million in 1999.

Despite the construction of additional parking to the centre during the redevelopment, pressure on the centre's car parks still remained. As a consequence, the centre entered into successful discussions with nearby Karrinyup Primary School to obtain use of its ovals from 17 to 31 December, as overflow parking. As part of the deal, the centre would supply security guards and lighting, as well as a payment of A$1,500 (1998) to the school along with additional costs for any damage or repair works required. The use of the oval was not warmly received by parents of the school, but in speaking for the Education Minister Colin Barnett, the Legislative Council leader Norman Moore noted that the parents of the school were not consulted about the arrangement, and that it was well within the power and authority of the school principal to enter into such arrangements without the need for consultation with parents.

=== 2019–2021 redevelopment ===
On 19 November 2018, construction commenced on the $800 million redevelopment to Karrinyup which had been planned as early as 2014. The redevelopment included:

- An expanded 2-floor fashion mall known as "The Loop" connected from the Big W Mall to the former centre court entrance featuring international fashion brands like H&M, Uniqlo, Zara and Sephora.
- A new food court, known as "The Cafe Terrace" on the second floor.
- An expanded fresh food offering, known as "The Fresh Market" featuring a new Coles, Aldi and a slew of new specialty food purveyors.
- A new alfresco entertainment and dining precinct, known as "The West Deck" and home to over 15 restaurants, a brand new 10-screen Hoyts cinema, Holey Moley, Archie Brothers Cirque Electric and Strike Bowling.
- Renovations to the existing mall and a refurbished Myer, Big W and Woolworths.
- Rebel, H&M, Uniqlo, Coco Republic, JB Hi-Fi, Sephora, Zara, Lego, Mecca, City Beach, Nike, Adidas, General Pants, Macpac, JD Sports, Cotton On Mega, Goodlife Health Clubs and Strandbags as new and expanded mini-major stores.
- Two new multi-deck parking lots with over 4,900 car bays along with expanded roof-top and basement parking.
- Two new apartment complexes featuring 94 apartments, the first for a shopping centre in Western Australia, and the second in Australia, behind Chadstone Shopping Centre in Victoria.

On 21 November 2019, a small portion of the fashion loop opened featuring H&M, Mecca and more, along with a six level multi-deck parking lot. In April 2020, renovations to Big W were completed along with expanded parking in June.

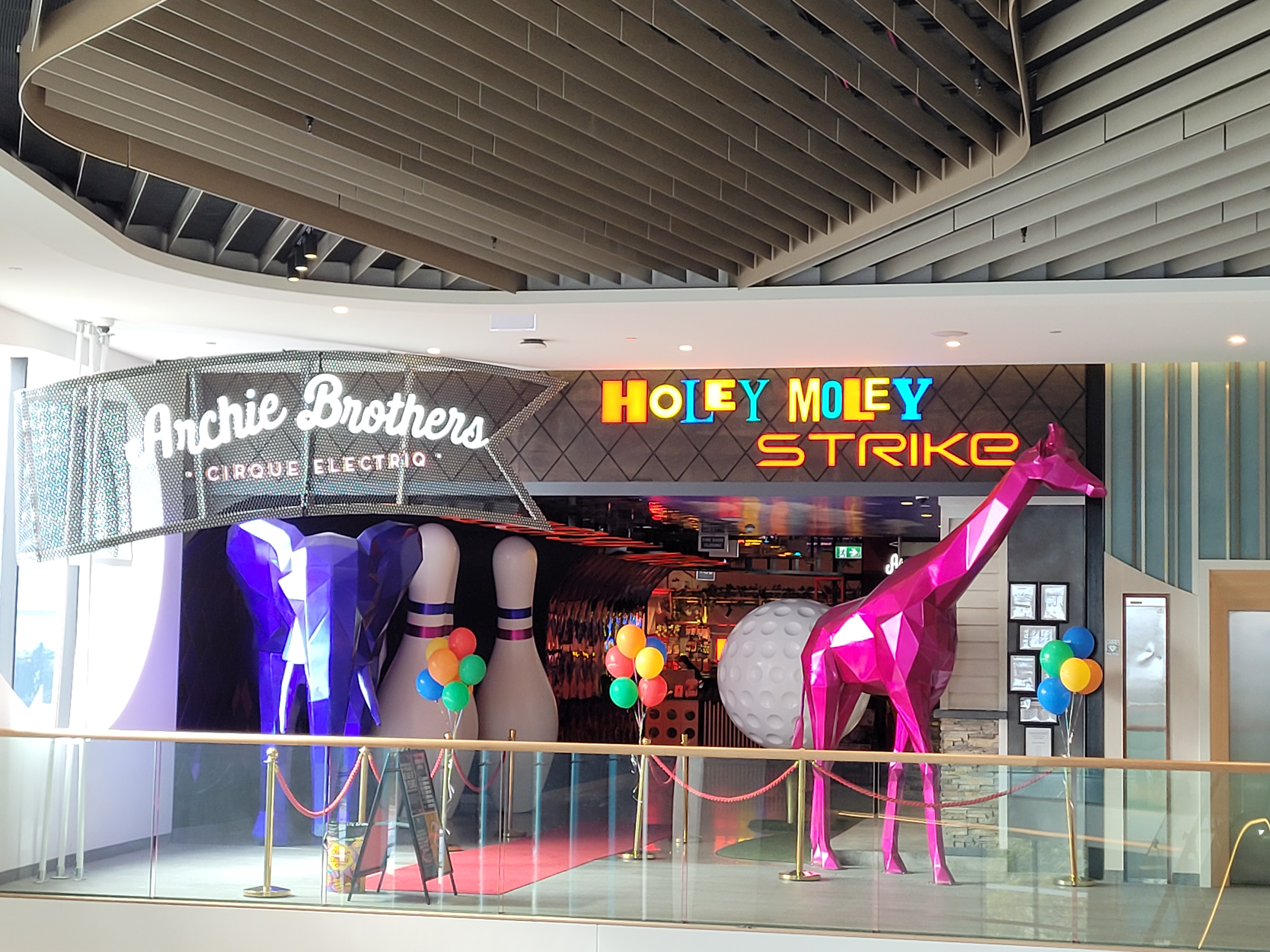
Strike Bowling, Holey Moley, and Archie Brothers Cirque Electric, built as part of the West Deck redevelopment

On 8 June 2021, it was announced that stage 1 of the redevelopment would open The Fresh Market featuring Coles, Aldi and others, along with the ground floor of The Loop. This would include such retailers as Cotton On Mega, JD Sports, Nike, Adidas, Rebel, JB Hi-Fi and many others. Stage 1 proceeded to open on 29 July 2021, featuring an additional 60 stores.

Stage 2 opened 7 October 2021 and included level of The Loop including such retailers as Zara, Sephora and Coco Republic, as well as The Cafe Terrace featuring over 15 restaurants.

On 28 October, the final stage of the centre opened. It included a new outdoor dining precinct including a 10-screen Hoyts cinema complex, a Goodlife Health Clubs, Archie Brothers Cirque Electriq, Strike Bowling, Holey Moley Golf Club and over 20 restaurants. Similar to the opening of Stage 2, the centre hosted a "Play x Eat Festival" through its opening weekend, which also featured the opening of the first ever Lego store in Western Australia.

=== Ownership ===
The centre was owned originally owned by St Martins Properties, with leasing functions being carried out by Milner and Company.

At the time the 1996 renovations were completed, the centre was owned by the Australian superannuation fund UniSuper, Schroders Property Fund and Schroders Private Property Syndicate, with leasing arrangements being handled by Richard Ellis.

In April 2002, AMP Shopping Centre Trust purchased the outstanding 25% it did not already control in the centre from Commonwealth Bank controlled investment vehicle, The Private Property Syndicate. The newly acquired stake combined with the holdings of the UniSuper and AMP Diversified Property Trust was vested in a new entity, the KSC Trust.

In September 2012, Westfield Group and Westfield Retail Trust sold their one-third holding in the centre to UniSuper, giving it 100% ownership.

== Major tenants ==
The centre is currently occupied by seven major tenants. Two department stores, one discount-department store, three supermarkets and one cinema complex.

- 13,900sqm 3-floor Myer department store
- 9,500sqm 2-floor David Jones department store.
- 7,850sqm Big W discount department store
- 4,200sqm Woolworths supermarket
- Coles supermarket
- Aldi supermarket
- 10-screen Hoyts cinema complex

=== Former tenants ===
- Aherns department store. Closed in 2000 and was rebranded to a David Jones following a buyout of the company.

== Architectural features ==
Perth-based architect Anna Meszaros was responsible for the interior design of the centre during the 1996 redevelopment. In an interview with Inside Retailing magazine, she noted how she wanted to move away from the "Disneyland effect of bright colours". Her brief was to provide customers to the centre a point of difference, particularly in the food court area. Like most conventional food courts, stores were arranged around a quadrangle, however unlike other food courts of the time the use of outside space was incorporated into the design. This was done by providing direct sunlight and outdoor connection by using curved skylights following the quadrangle shape. This was later upgraded to include an alfresco dining area. The area in the middle of the food court was raised using a timber floor with removable dining furniture, providing for significant flexibility in how it is used.

== Events ==
During the centre's life, a number of significant international personalities have visited the centre in connection with major events and fundraising efforts. Once such visit was by Ronan Keating on 27 July 2002; 500 local fans packed the Centre Court area to get a glimpse of the performer, who had been in concert at Perth Entertainment Centre the previous night.

The centre also maintains active links to the surrounding community. More recently it implemented a walking program in conjunction with the Injury Control Council of Western Australia. Trained walking leaders accompany groups through the centre twice a week and perform both warm-up and cool down exercises. The Rotary Club of Scarborough also organises and operates a weekly swap meet, held each Sunday in the southern under cover parking area.

== Incidents ==
The centre has not gone without its share of local controversy. In 2006, a security guard and disgraced former officer of the Western Australia Police working at the centre received a 12-month suspended sentence for the destruction of crucial evidence in the trial of a police assault against an alleged teenage shoplifter. The security officer, then head of the security at the centre, gave evidence at a Corruption & Crime Commission hearing in June 2006 that he had over-written the video recording showing the assault, because he did not understand why the constable hit the alleged offender and did not want the officer to lose his job.

On 16 December 2021, a fight began between 10 people during a screening of Spider-Man: No Way Home in the Hoyts cinema complex. After being escorted out of the cinema by security guards, the fight continued in the West Deck until all people involved in the fight were permanently banned from the shopping centre.

== Transport ==
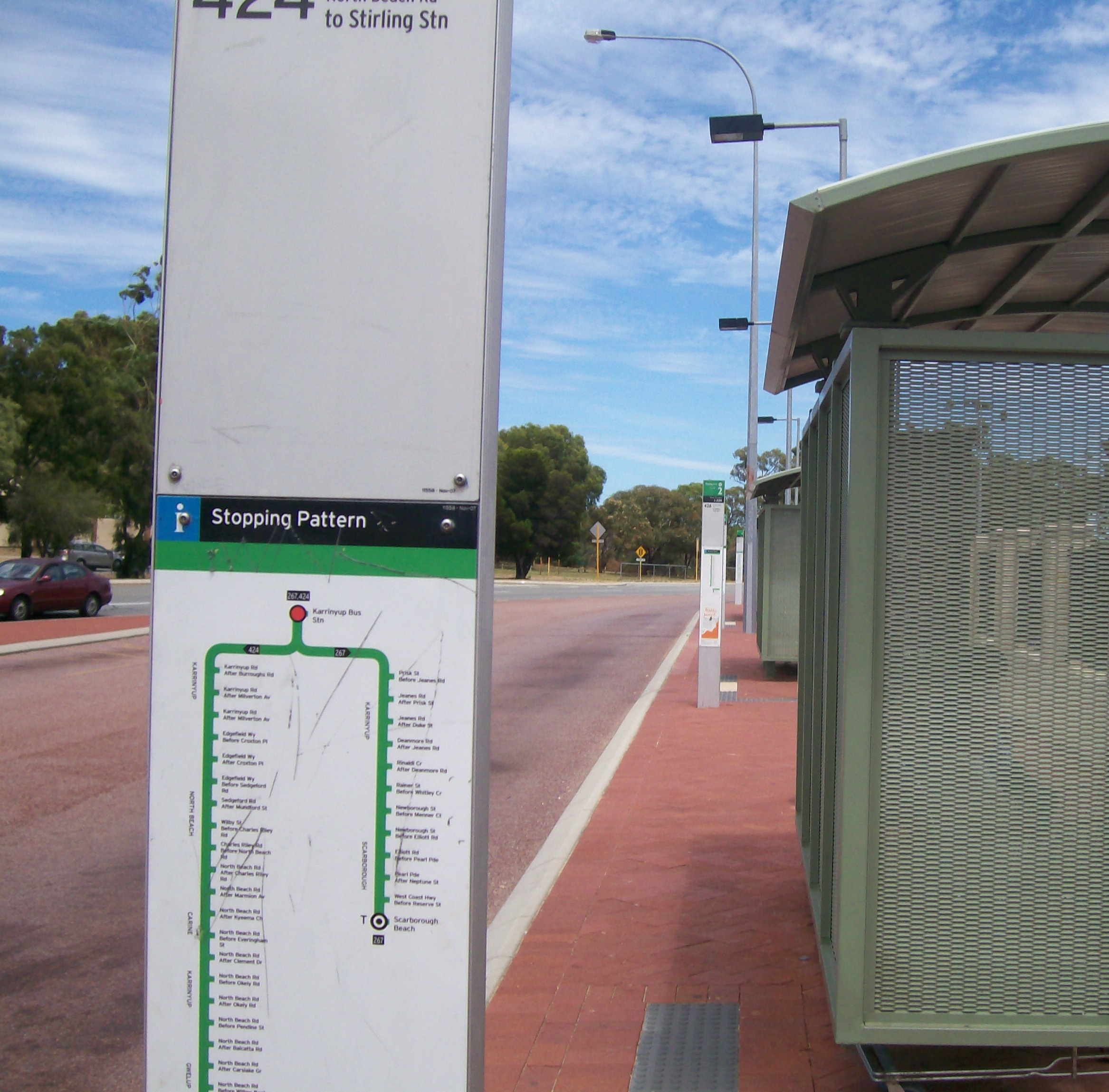
Karrinyup bus station

Adjoining the centre is the Karrinyup bus station. It is operated by Swan Transit, provides bus services to surrounding suburbs from Warwick to Stirling, and out to Scarborough. Bus services also connect the centre to the Yanchep railway line and the Perth central business district via connections at Warwick and Stirling railway stations.
