= Windsor Hall =

Windsor Hall may refer to:

- Windsor Hall (Bournemouth), a hall at the Bournemouth International Centre in Dorset, England used for concerts, conferences, and other events
- Windsor Hall (Cumberland, Maryland), a hall in Cumberland, Maryland
- Windsor Hall (Montreal), a former concert venue associated with the Windsor Hotel in Montreal, Canada
- Windsor Hall (Mount Lawley), a historic house located in Mount Lawley, Western Australia
- Windsor Hall (North Lanarkshire), a hall in Bargeddie, North Lanarkshire, Scotland
- Windsor Hall (University of Reading), a residential hall located at the University of Reading in Berkshire, England

== See also ==
- SS Windsor Hall, a cargo ship sunk during World War I
- Windsor Hall Apartments, apartments in Kansas City, Missouri listed on the National Register of Historic Places
