= Westfield Innaloo =

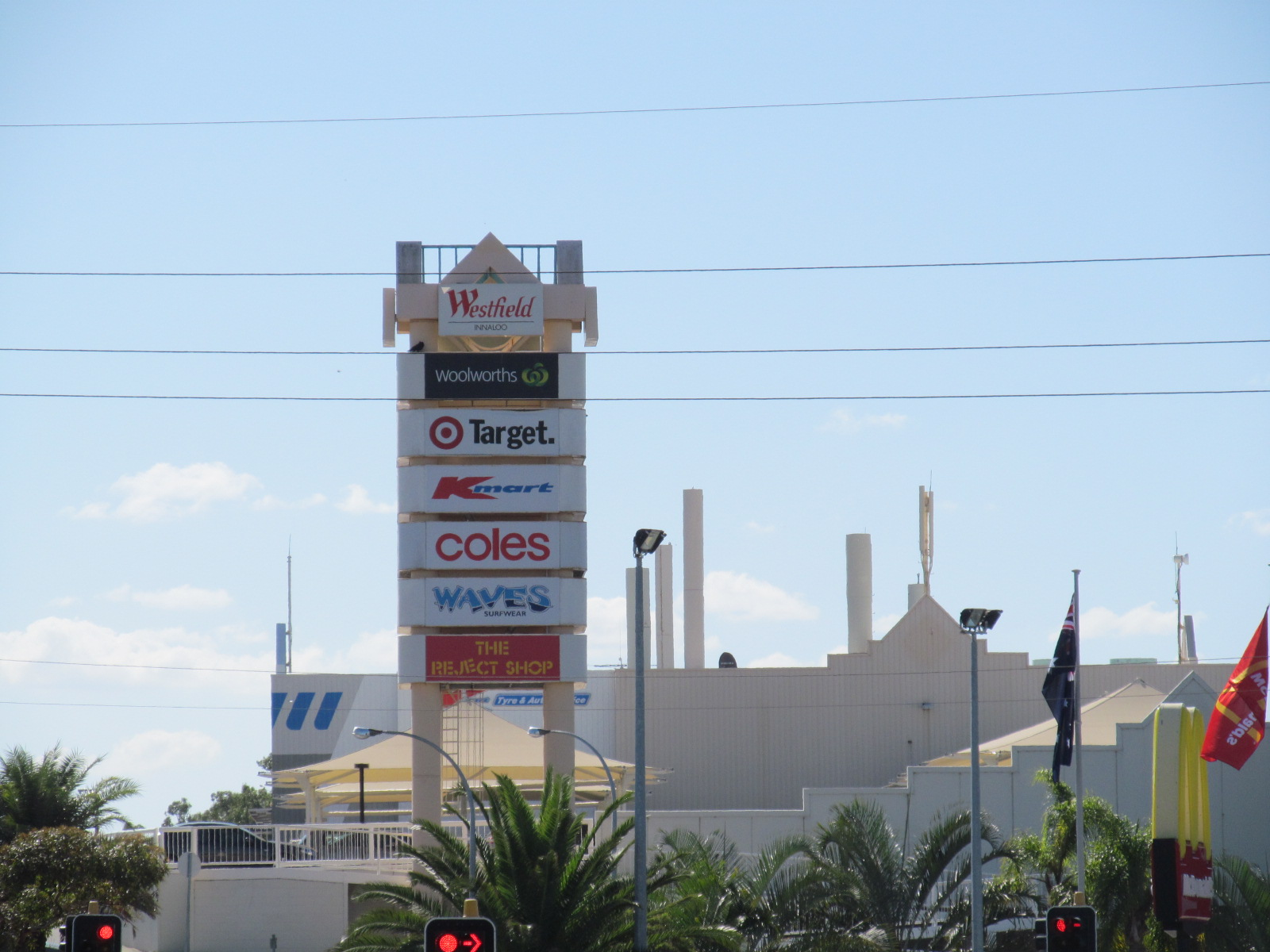
- Location: Innaloo, Western Australia
- Coordinates: 31°54′05″S 115°47′57″E
- Opened: 1967
- Previous names: Innaloo Shoppers Village
- Manager: Scentre Group
- Owner: Scentre Group
- Num. of stores: 171
- Num. of anchor tenants: 4
- Floor area: 47,030 m^{2} (506,200 sq ft)
- Floors: 1
- Parking: 2,395
- Website: Official website

Westfield Innaloo is a major shopping centre in the northern suburbs of Perth. It is located at the corner of Scarborough Beach Road and Ellen Stirling Boulevard in Innaloo, approximately 8 kilometres (5.0 mi) north-west of the Perth central business district. The shopping centre is approximately 1 kilometre (0.62 mi), or 3 minutes by bus, from Stirling railway station, and is part of Stirling City Centre.

== History ==
The shopping centre, originally known as Innaloo Shoppers Village, was developed in 1967 to service Innaloo and newly developed Woodlands. It was the second shopping centre built north of the Swan River and opened with about 30 stores plus a Boans department store and Woolworths supermarket. A Target store, and a Coles supermarket, were added to the centre in 1980.

The centre was acquired by Coles Myer in 1983. Nine years later, the centre's name was changed to Innaloo City Centre and a 375-seat food court and Kmart were added.

In December 1996, Westfield Group acquired the centre and changed its name to Westfield Innaloo. In 2004–05, the centre grew in size by over 25% as more than 30 specialty stores were added and the Coles supermarket was relocated. In July 2014 the Westfield Group became two companies (Scentre Group and Westfield Corporation), with ownership and management of the centre transferring to Scentre Group. A new entrance was also built to go with previously erected signage nearby, and Westfield acquired the adjacent Centro Innaloo and renamed it Innaloo Megacentre.

In December 2019 Scentre Group announced it had deferred a redevelopment of Westfield Innaloo. The $600 million work would have seen the complex doubling in size to 110,000 square metres (1,200,000 sq ft) of retail space, joining Westfield Carousel as Western Australia's biggest shopping centre.

In 2020 the shopping centre was intended to be rebranded to Westfield Stirling, but as of 13 March 2022 that has not happened. Honouring James Stirling, after whom the City of Stirling is named in which Westfield Innaloo is situated and which is itself facing calls to rename, is increasingly under pressure, because Stirling personally led the attack on a group of approximately seventy Bindjareb men, women and children on 28 October 1834 now known as the Pinjarra massacre.
