= Coco Republic =

Australian furniture retail chain

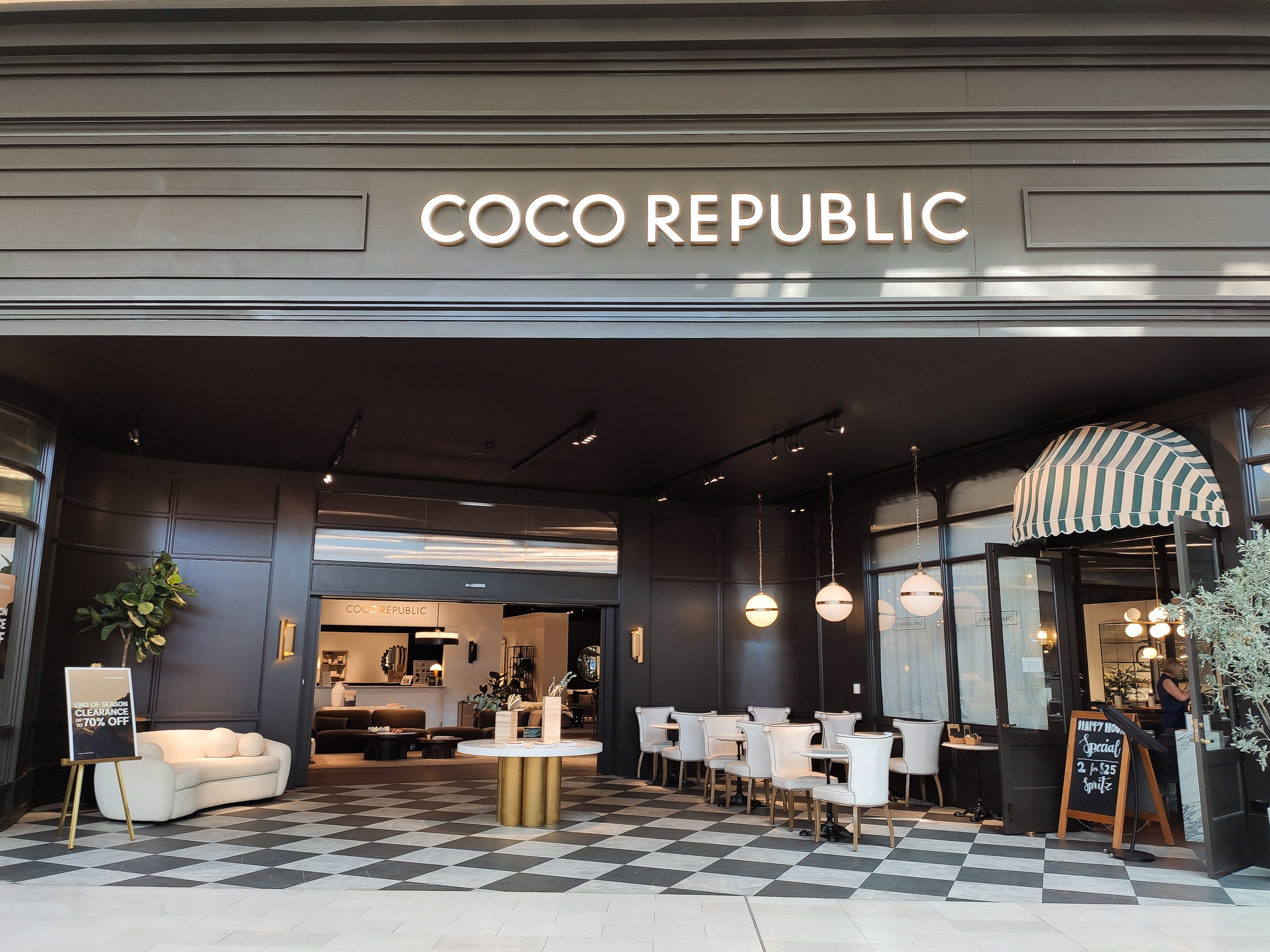
- Coco Republic showroom in Karrinyup Shopping Centre with L'Americano cafe
- Industry: Furniture
- Founded: 1984; 42 years ago
- Founder: Paul Spon-Smith
- Number of locations: 17 stores (2025)
- Areas served: Australia; New Zealand; United States
- Key people: Paul Spon-Smith (Founder and Chairman); Anthony Spon-Smith (Executive Director); Jeremy Byrne (Executive Director); Nicholas Foster (CEO and Non Executive Director)
- Website: cocorepublic.com.au

Coco Republic is an Australian furniture retail chain. The company is involved in the retail selling of furniture and homewares, providing interior design and property styling services and the management of a design school. The company also owns and co-operates three hospitality venues under the L'Americano Espresso Bar name.

The company currently operates a number of divisions: Coco Republic (B2C retail and B2B trade), Coco Republic Interior Design, Coco Republic Property Styling, Coco Republic Design School

== History ==
Coco Republic, trading under entity Saveba Pty Ltd, is a family owned and operated furniture, interior design, property styling and design education company.

Paul Spon-Smith founded Mr Smith Interiors in 1979 in Pymble, Sydney, before opening as Town & Country Living with the first showroom in Crows Nest, in 1984.

In 2002, the furniture store was rebranded as Coco Republic when Paul's son Anthony Spon-Smith joined the company, along with Jeremy Byrne. Today, Byrne leads their on commercial activation.

Coco Republic Interior Design was established in 2006 with offices in Sydney, Melbourne and Brisbane servicing Australia and New Zealand.

Coco Republic Design School was founded in 2009 offering short design courses in partnership with the TAFE NSW (RTO 90003) Design Centre Enmore, online and on campus in Sydney and Melbourne.

In 2019, Coco Republic entered the US market through Californian retailer HD Buttercup. The company expanded to New Zealand in August 2019, opening its first store at Westfield Newmarket.

In February 2020, Anthony Spon-Smith became a RH Artisan for US retailer Restoration Hardware, with 66 stores across the US and an annual turnover at $2.65 billion in 2018. RH now sell two outdoor collections designed by Anthony, Capri and Portofino and the indoor Sylvain Sofa and chair collection which has been selling with Restoration Hardware since mid 2019.

In October 2021, private equity firm Story3 Capital Partners acquired a majority stake in the company.

In July 2023, Coco Republic launched their US online store.

== Locations ==
Coco Republic has 15 showrooms in Australia and New Zealand. They are located at Sydney, Melbourne, Brisbane, Gold Coast, Canberra, Perth, and Auckland.

In the US, the company has showrooms in Los Angeles and Orange County.

Coco Republic Contract is a wholesale furniture offering of 550+ products is available specifically to large scale commercial projects, within Australia, New Zealand and internationally.

== Financials ==
In FY19, the company recorded sales of $96,572,629, up 17% from $82,559,248 in FY18 and a 69% improvement in operating income.

== Awards ==
The Auckland showroom opened in August 2019 won Supreme Winner, Big Box Group Winner and GDM Craftsmanship Excellence Award at the New Zealand Red Awards for commercial design.

The Belle Coco Republic Interior Design Awards enters its tenth year in 2020, with an annual awards platform for the Australian interior design community. Coco Republic Executive Directors Anthony Spon-Smith and Jeremy Byrne were on the judging panel in 2019.

== Partnerships ==
The Belle Coco Republic Interior Design Awards, an annual award platform in the Australian interior design community, entered its 10th year in 2020.
