= Trigg, Western Australia =

Trigg Perth, Western Australia
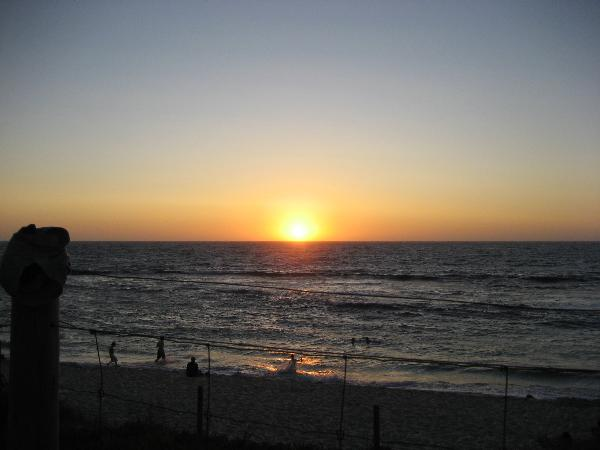
- Sunset over Mettam's Pool, 2006
- Coordinates: 31.8719°S 115.759°E
- Population: 2,855 (SAL 2021)
- Established: 1940s
- Postcode(s): 6029
- Area: 2.4 km^{2} (0.9 sq mi)
- Location: 14 km (9 mi) from Perth
- LGA(s): City of Stirling
- State electorate(s): Carine, Scarborough
- Federal division(s): Curtin; Moore
Suburbs around Trigg:
	North Beach	Carine
Indian Ocean	Trigg	Karrinyup
	Scarborough	Doubleview

Trigg is a suburb of Perth, Western Australia. Its local government area is the City of Stirling. Trigg Island is a small island off the coast of the suburb of Trigg.

== Overview ==
Trigg Beach is one of Perth's most popular beaches for board riding, catering mainly to surfers and body boarders alike, with a small majority of swimmers. In summer, shifting sand fills the channel between the blue hole and Trigg Point take off point for a long continuous wave ride to Trigg Beach.

Trigg also has a snorkelling beach, Mettam's Pool, which is to the north of the main surf/swim area.

Trigg nature reserve is situated opposite Trigg Beach. It is also known to be a common meeting point and lookout for the local surfing community.

With playground protection from the sun and sea breeze, Clarko beach side reserve near Trigg Island is one of the most popular parks in the City of Stirling. Clarko Reserve was created when beach shacks were demolished and shack owners were compensated with sub-divided blocks of residential land further east in the new Trigg suburb.

== History ==
The suburb and island was named after "Henry Trigg", Superintendent of Public Works for the Swan River Colony in 1842. First time when land at Trigg was taken up, reaches back to 1877. Not until the late 1940s, Trigg has started to develop, whereby many of the streets reaching through it were named after former residents, pioneers and local personalities.

== Transport ==
=== Bus ===
- 423 Stirling Station to Warwick Station – serves Karrinyup Road, Arnott Street, Bennion Street and Kitchener Street
- 424 Stirling Station to Karrinyup Bus Station – serves Charles Riley Road

== Image gallery ==
Sign for Mettam's Pool

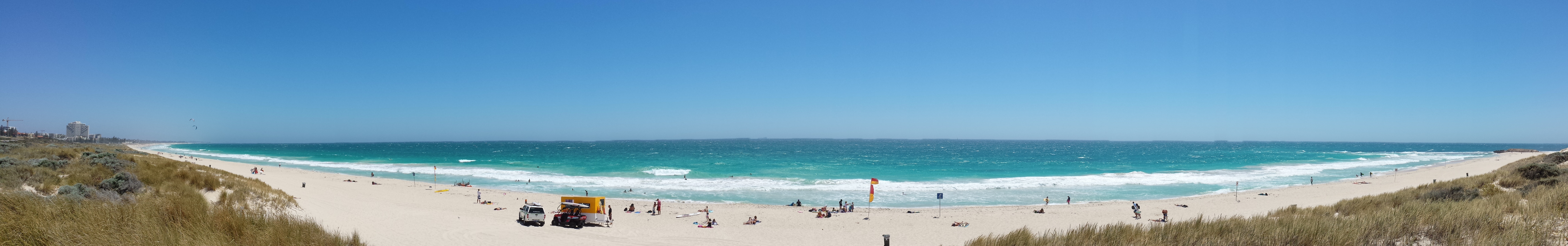
Panorama of Trigg Beach
