= Stirling, Western Australia =

Stirling
- Suburb
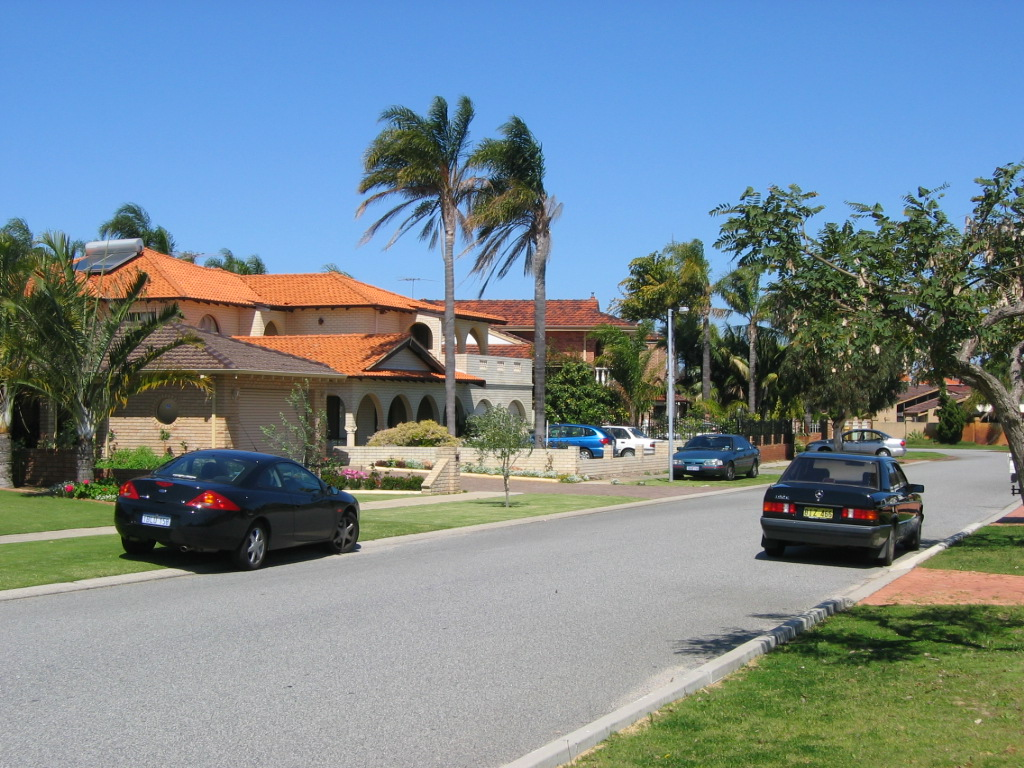
- Homes in the suburb of Stirling
- Interactive map of Stirling
- Coordinates: 31.883°S 115.81°E
- Country: Australia
- State: Western Australia
- City: Perth
- LGA: City of Stirling
- Location: 10 km (6.2 mi) NNW of Perth CBD
- Established: 1960s

Government
  - State electorate: Balcatta
  - Federal division: Cowan

Area
  - Total: 4.6 km^{2} (1.8 sq mi)

Population
  - Total: 10,165 (SAL 2021)
- Postcode: 6021
Suburbs around Stirling
Gwelup	Balcatta	Balcatta
Gwelup	Stirling	Tuart Hill
Innaloo	Osborne Park	Osborne Park

Stirling is a suburb of Perth, the capital city of Western Australia, about 10 km north of Perth's central business district (CBD) along the Mitchell Freeway. Its local government area is the City of Stirling, whose council offices and administration centre are located in the southwest of the mostly residential suburb.

== History ==
Stirling is named after James Stirling, the first Western Australian governor (1829–1838). The name was approved in April 1976 at the request of the City of Stirling, as the area contained the Council's headquarters. The suburb was part of Balcatta until 1976.

Throughout the wetland regions, Aboriginals hunted for kangaroo, emu, snakes, tortoise, mudfish, gilgies and water birds and their eggs, to name a few food sources. Aboriginal sites are known to have existed in a few locations in the Gwelup-Balcatta region.

=== Early European settlement (to 1960) ===
The area's first European settlement was as an extension of the Osborne Park market area. Its initial growth in importance as an agricultural area in the 1920s came from three major factors: retired Chinese miners from the Eastern Goldfields, the post-World War I Soldier Settlement Scheme (many of whom had no experience in intensive farming), and an influx of Italians prior to Mussolini's effective banning of emigration in 1927, who mostly started life in Western Australia as miners and woodcutters. Dino Gava noted: "The process of (Italian) chain migration was strong in Osborne Park and Wanneroo. They arrived ill-prepared with regard to language and education but their youth and willingness to work made them desirable settlers." By 1935, the area was producing all sorts of fruit and vegetables, and a 1961 newspaper reported that "hundreds of acres are under cultivation, (and) nearly all types of vegetable are produced in the area. Part of the produce is exported to other countries."

=== Suburban development (1960-) ===
Major changes occurred in the 1960s and 1970s. The main access to the area from Perth was via Wanneroo Road and Balcatta Beach Road, a road which roughly corresponded to Karrinyup Road but included modern-day North Beach Drive and Osborne Place. Hertha Road (now Civic Place and Telford Crescent) was the main road in the area, and the site of the present-day footbridge was the municipal rubbish tip until the early 1970s. The Osborne Park hospital was opened on 4 April 1962 and the civic centre and council chambers were opened in 1966, along with houses in the George Street area near the civic centre. The postal district was approved and gazetted in April 1976, and over the next eight years, most of the suburb was subdivided and built.

The building of the Mitchell Freeway to Karrinyup Road in 1983-84 facilitated the growth of Stirling as a regional hub, and the bus/train interchange on the Joondalup line (now known as the Yanchep line) was completed in 1992. As at 2006, some subdivisions in the Stirling region are still being developed.

== Geography ==
Stirling is bounded by the Mitchell Freeway between Erindale Road and Hutton Street on the west and south, Amelia and Poincaire Streets to the north, and an uneven line running roughly south from Jones Street's north-south section to the east. Lake estates and public parks, including the Stirling Civic Gardens, make up a moderate percentage of the suburb's area.

== Demographics ==
At the 2021 Australian census, Stirling had a population of 10,165 people living in 3,885 dwellings, up from the population of 5,752 in 2001. The suburb is one of Perth's most ethnically diverse - in 2001, 23% were of Italian descent, 24% of Macedonian, 6% Asian, and 4% Greek, and this reflects strongly in the architectural styles which have been adopted in the area. In 2021, 21.9% of residents claimed Italian ancestry. 57.8% of residents had both parents born overseas - higher than the state average of 41.6%. Other than English, the top languages spoken at home were noted as Italian (7.3%), Mandarin (5.1%), Macedonian (2.8%), Cantonese (2.5%), and Gujarati (1.7%). Catholicism was the most prevalent religious affiliation (37.7%), followed by No religion (27.3%), Eastern Orthodox (6.4%), Anglican (5.4%), and Not stated (4.0%).

== Facilities ==
Stirling is host to the Osborne Park Hospital, a 205-bed community general hospital which offers some specialist services as well as radiology and pathology. There are no schools within the suburb, although Balcatta Senior High School is located on the northern boundary (Poincaire Street) and numerous primary schools are located in nearby Gwelup, Osborne Park and Balcatta.

Stirling relies on the Stirling Village shopping centre, containing an IGA and specialty stores, in Cedric Street for basic commercial services, and Karrinyup Shopping Centre for other services. Numerous reserves and sports grounds are scattered throughout the area. The Stirling Lions soccer club is based just outside the suburb.

== Transport ==
Stirling is served by the Stirling train station, which is a 9-minute commute to the Perth CBD. Services through the suburb include the Transperth 414 bus route running along Cedric Street between Stirling and Glendalough, the 403/404 routes from Perth which services Hamilton Street in the suburb's southeast, and the CircleRoute along lower Cedric Street and Karrinyup Road. The Public Transport Authority is responsible for these services.

=== Bus ===
- 402 Stirling Station to Perth Busport – serves Cedric Street and Karrinyup Road
- 403 Stirling Station to Perth Busport – serves Cedric Street, Karrinyup Road, Telford Crescent, Messina Avenue, Cassino Drive and Hamilton Street
- 414 Stirling Station to Glendalough Station – serves Cedric Street, Karrinyup Road and Jones Street
- 415 Stirling Station to Mirrabooka Bus Station – serves Cedric Street
- Surf CAT Stirling Station to Scarborough Beach Bus Station
- 424 Stirling Station to Karrinyup Bus Station – serves Cedric Street and Karrinyup Road
- 425 Stirling Station to Warwick Station – serves Cedric Street and Karrinyup Road
- 427 Stirling Station to Warwick Station – serves Cedric Street, Civic Place, Hugo Street, Osborne Place, Karrinyup Road and Erindale Road
- 428 Stirling Station to Warwick Station – serves Cedric Street, Amelia Street and Odin Drive
- 998 Fremantle Station to Fremantle Station (limited stops) – CircleRoute Clockwise, serves Stirling Station, Cedric Street and Karrinyup Road
- 999 Fremantle Station to Fremantle Station (limited stops) – CircleRoute Anti-Clockwise, serves Karrinyup Road, Cedric Street and Stirling Station

Bus routes serving Stirling Station only:

- 410, 412, 421 and 422 Stirling Station to Scarborough Beach Bus Station
- 413 Stirling Station to Glendalough Station
- 423 Stirling Station to Warwick Station

=== Rail ===
- Yanchep line
  - Stirling Station

== Politics ==
Stirling is a mixed-wealth suburb with many "mortgage belt" families. In 2001, 52% of the suburb's population were from Southern Europe, and the Balcatta Central and Osborne Park booths are among the northern suburbs' few genuinely marginal booths at federal level. However, they strongly support the Australian Labor Party at state elections.

2004 federal election
Liberal	45%
Labor	43%
Greens	5.2%
CDP	1.8%
Democrats	1.5%

2001 federal election
Labor	48%
Liberal	37%
Democrats	5.3%
Greens	4.3%
One Nation	3.4%

2005 state election
Labor	53%
Liberal	36%
Greens	6.0%
CDP	5.2%

2001 state election
Labor	50%
Liberal	35%
One Nation	4.4%
Greens	4.2%
Independent	3.2%
