= Trigg Island =

Location on coast of Perth, Western Australia

Coordinates: 31°52′33.1″S 115°45′03.6″E

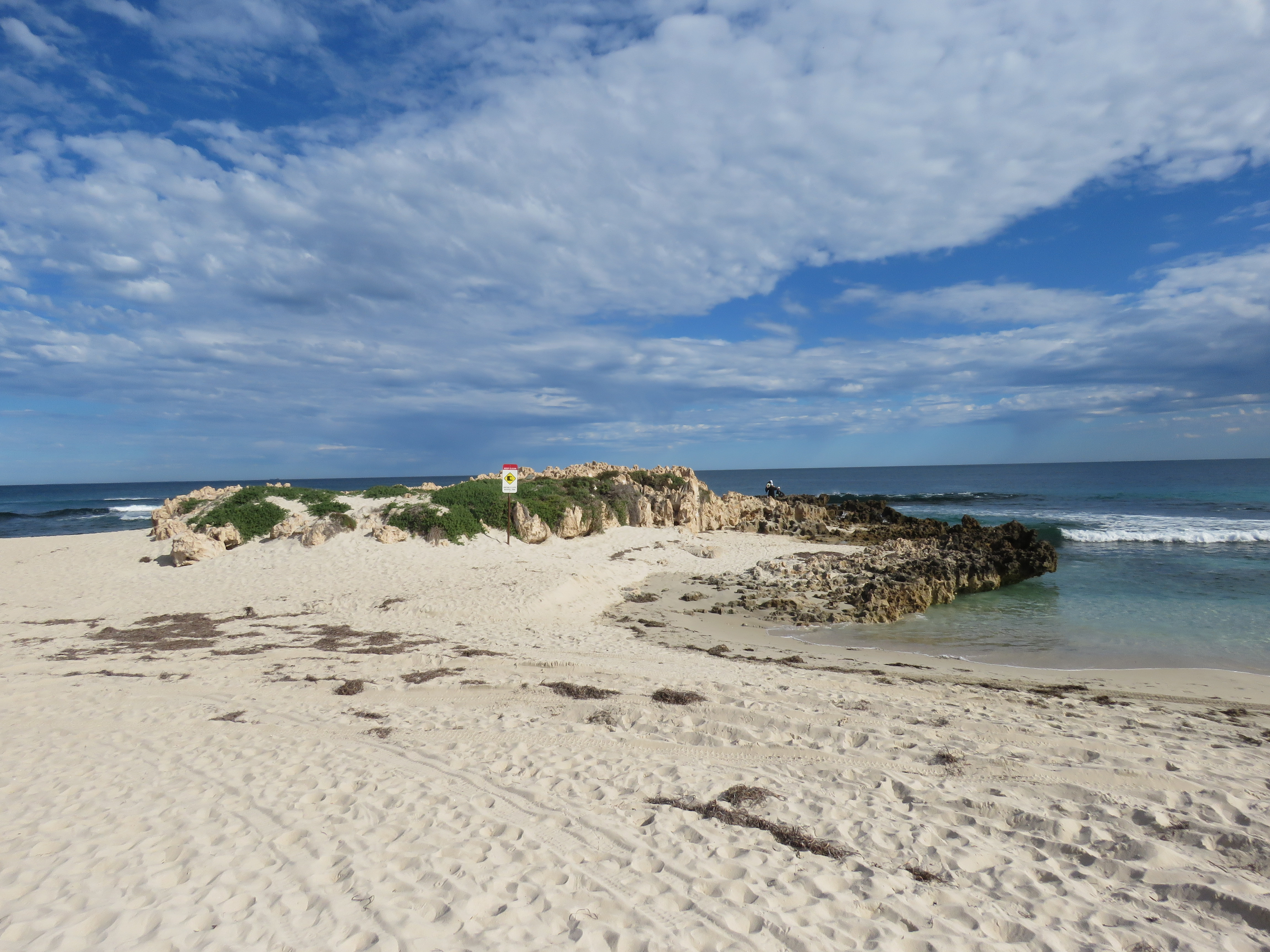
Trigg Island in May 2023

Trigg Island is a small rocky outcrop off the coast of the suburb of Trigg in Perth, Western Australia. It is named after Henry Stirling Trigg, Superintendent of Public Works in the Colony of Western Australia from 1838 to 1851.

Trigg Island is a small rocky aeolianite limestone remnant of Pleistocene dunes, better characterised as an outcrop than an island, and as such is typical of the Perth coast. It is sometimes physically joined to the beach by movements of both the sand and the tide.

Trigg Island is notorious for its blue hole, located at the south end of the island. In September 1931, four men nearly died when their boat capsized near the blue hole. In May 1947, two brothers died in the blue hole, and later that year in July a nun named Sister Mary Chrysostom, and her would-be rescuer Frederick Charles Floyd, also drowned. A plaque commemorating the deaths of the latter two is stored in the Trigg Island Surf Life Saving Club facilities. Many others have been rescued or died in or near the blue hole since. These events were the main factor in the establishment of the Trigg Island Surf Life Saving Club.

The beaches around Trigg Island are patrolled by the Trigg Island Surf Life Saving Club.

== See also ==
- List of islands of Perth, Western Australia
