= Karrinyup bus station =

Bus station in Karrinyup, Western Australia

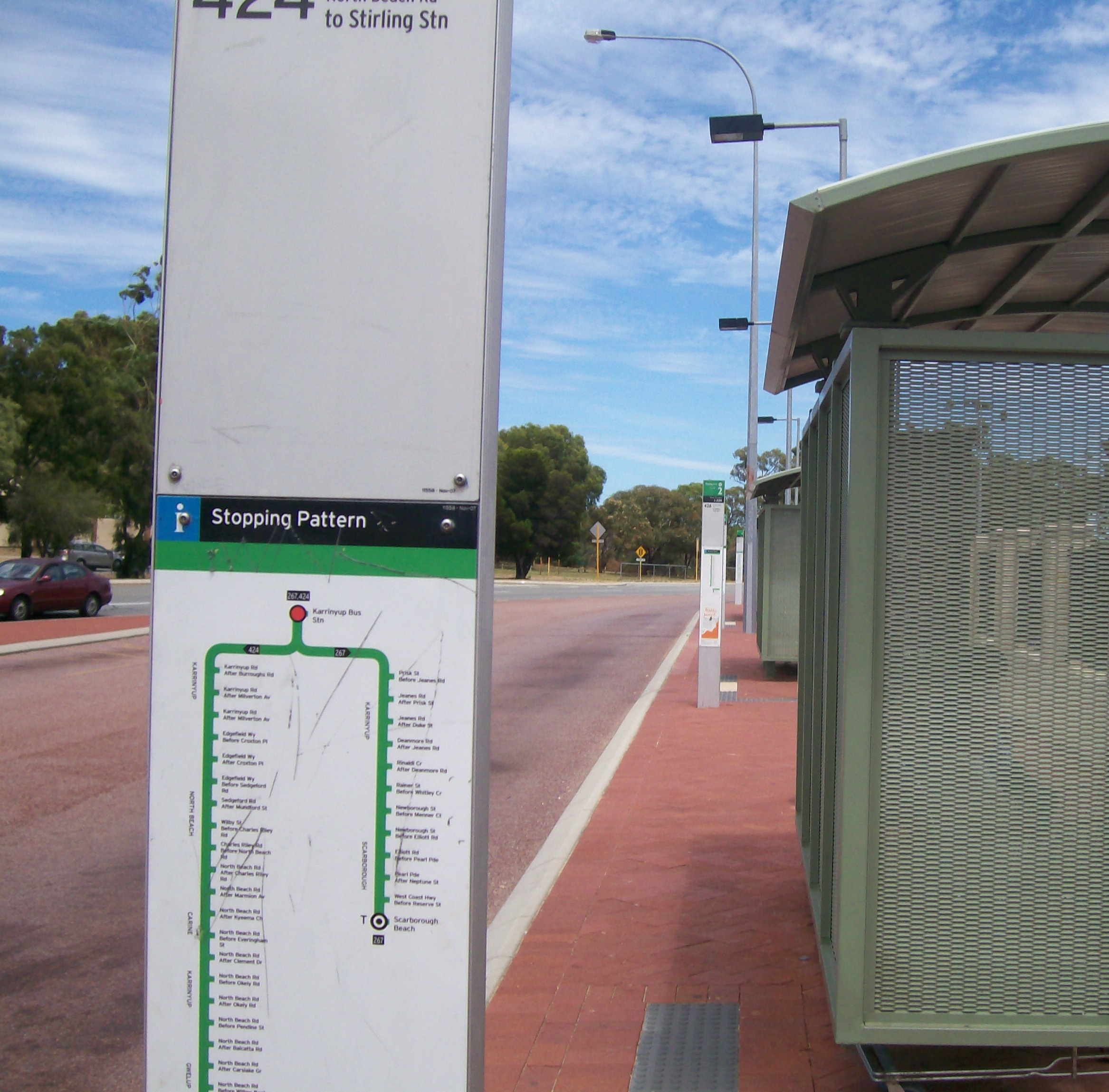
- Karrinyup bus station in 2010

General information
- Location: Karrinyup Road, Karrinyup; Western Australia; Australia
- Coordinates: 31°52′41″S 115°46′40″E
- Owner: Public Transport Authority
- Operator: Transperth
- Bus routes: 5
- Bus stands: 4

Other information
- Fare zone: 2

History
- Opened: 16 September 1973
Location

Karrinyup bus station is a Transperth bus station located next to Karrinyup Shopping Centre in Karrinyup, approximately 10 kilometres north of Perth, Western Australia. It has four stands and is served by five Transperth routes operated by Swan Transit.

Karrinyup station originally opened on 16 September 1973. It was refurbished in 2007, providing improved seating and accessible ramps to the adjacent shopping centre, and subsequently upgraded in 2015.

In 2020, the bus station temporarily moved to the median strip while redevelopment works were carried out at the shopping centre. The bus station reopened at its original location on 5 September 2021.

== Bus routes ==
Stop	Route	Destination / description	Notes
Stand 1	423	Stirling station via Karrinyup Road	
Stand 1	425	Stirling station via Karrinyup Road	
Stand 2	422	Stirling station via Huntriss Road	
Stand 2	424	Stirling station via North Beach Road	
Stand 3	422	Scarborough via Rainer Street	
Stand 3	423	Warwick station via West Coast Drive	
Stand 3	425	Warwick station via Carine	
Stand 4	616	Special events services	
Stand 4	650	Optus Stadium, Burswood	
