= Scarborough, Western Australia =

Scarborough
- Suburb
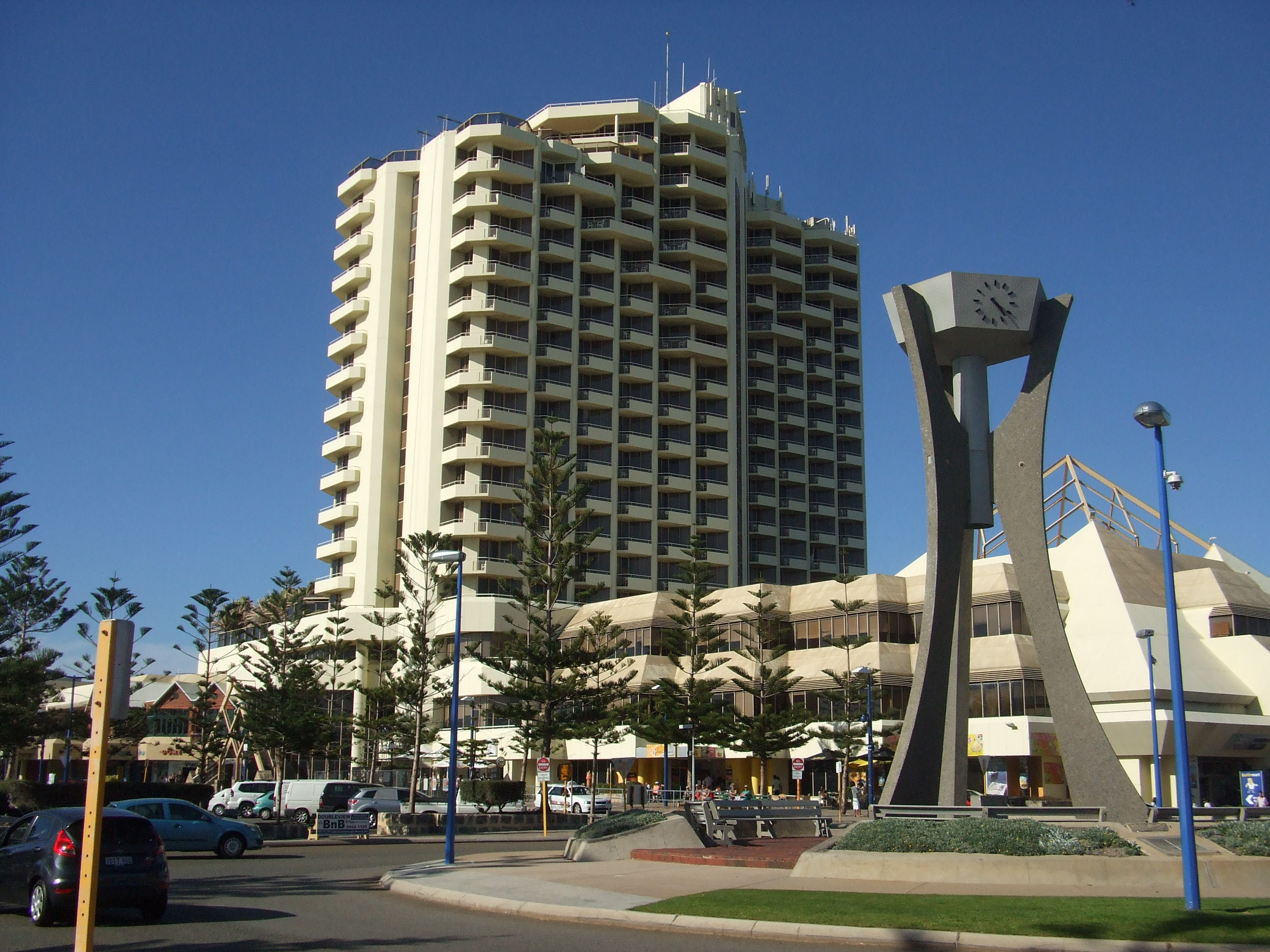
- Rendezvous Observation City
- Interactive map of Scarborough
- Coordinates: 31.8942°S 115.7642°E
- Country: Australia
- State: Western Australia
- City: Perth
- LGA: City of Stirling
- Location: 13 km (8.1 mi) NW of Perth CBD

Government
  - State electorate: Scarborough
  - Federal division: Curtin

Area
  - Total: 5.0 km^{2} (1.9 sq mi)

Population
  - Total: 17,605 (SAL 2021)
- Postcode: 6019
Suburbs around Scarborough
| Trigg | Karrinyup |
| Scarborough | Doubleview |
| City Beach | Wembley Downs |

Scarborough is a coastal suburb of Perth, Western Australia, located approximately 14 km northwest of the city centre in the City of Stirling local government area. Located along the coast of the Indian Ocean, it was named after the English beach resort Scarborough, North Yorkshire.

It has a population of about 14,300 people (2011 census), of whom about 25% were born overseas, mostly in the United Kingdom. It has a landmark high-rise hotel, the Rendezvous Hotel Perth Scarborough, originally built as Observation City in 1986 for Alan Bond, in anticipation of a demand for accommodation when the 1987 America's Cup challenge was held at nearby Fremantle. Scarborough Beach was the venue for the Australian Surf Life Saving Championships for the years 2007, 2008, 2009, 2014, 2018 and 2023.

== Scarborough Beach ==
Scarborough Beach is an entertainment precinct within the suburb with restaurants, bars and a nightclub. Since 1999, the local council has deployed a strategy for issues including traffic, parking, zoning, coastal landscape and recreation.

=== Development ===
One of the issues was whether or not to allow further high-rise development on Scarborough Beach. The 24-level Observation City hotel development (now Rendezvous) was very controversial in the 1980s but proceeded despite a long and intense public campaign against high-rise beachfront development. Perth businessman Alan Bond, who built Observation City, had ambitious plans to convert the entire Scarborough Beach "strip". After securing most of the real estate, his plans failed to proceed because he was unable to purchase the family-owned fast food restaurant Peter's by the Sea. The restaurant still exists today after it refused to sell despite Bond making inflated offers on the property, and it has taken on historical significance with the locals ever since. Subsequent amendments by the City of Stirling have specified a height limit of eight storeys.

In April 2019, the ocean-side Scarborough Beach Pool opened.

Despite a considerable social history over decades, Scarborough Beach has one listed physical heritage feature, the 'Rotary Clock Tower of Scarborough Beach' otherwise known as the 'Scarborough Clock Tower.

== Transport ==
=== Bus ===
==== Bus Stations ====
- Scarborough Beach Bus Station

==== Bus Routes ====
- 410 Scarborough Beach Bus Station to Stirling Station – serves West Coast Highway, Brighton Road, Drabble Road, Stewart Street and Millcrest Street
- 412 Scarborough Beach Bus Station to Stirling Station – serves West Coast Highway, Brighton Road, Drabble Road, Ventnor Street, Hastings Street and Cobb Street
- 420 Surf CAT Stirling Station to Scarborough Beach Bus Station
- 421 Scarborough Beach Bus Station to Stirling Station – serves West Coast Highway, Pearl Parade, Coral Street and Sackville Terrace
- 422 Scarborough Beach Bus Station to Stirling Station – serves West Coast Highway, Pearl Parade, Elliott Road and Newborough Street
- 990 Scarborough Beach Bus Station to Perth Busport (high frequency) – serves Scarborough Beach Road

== Education ==
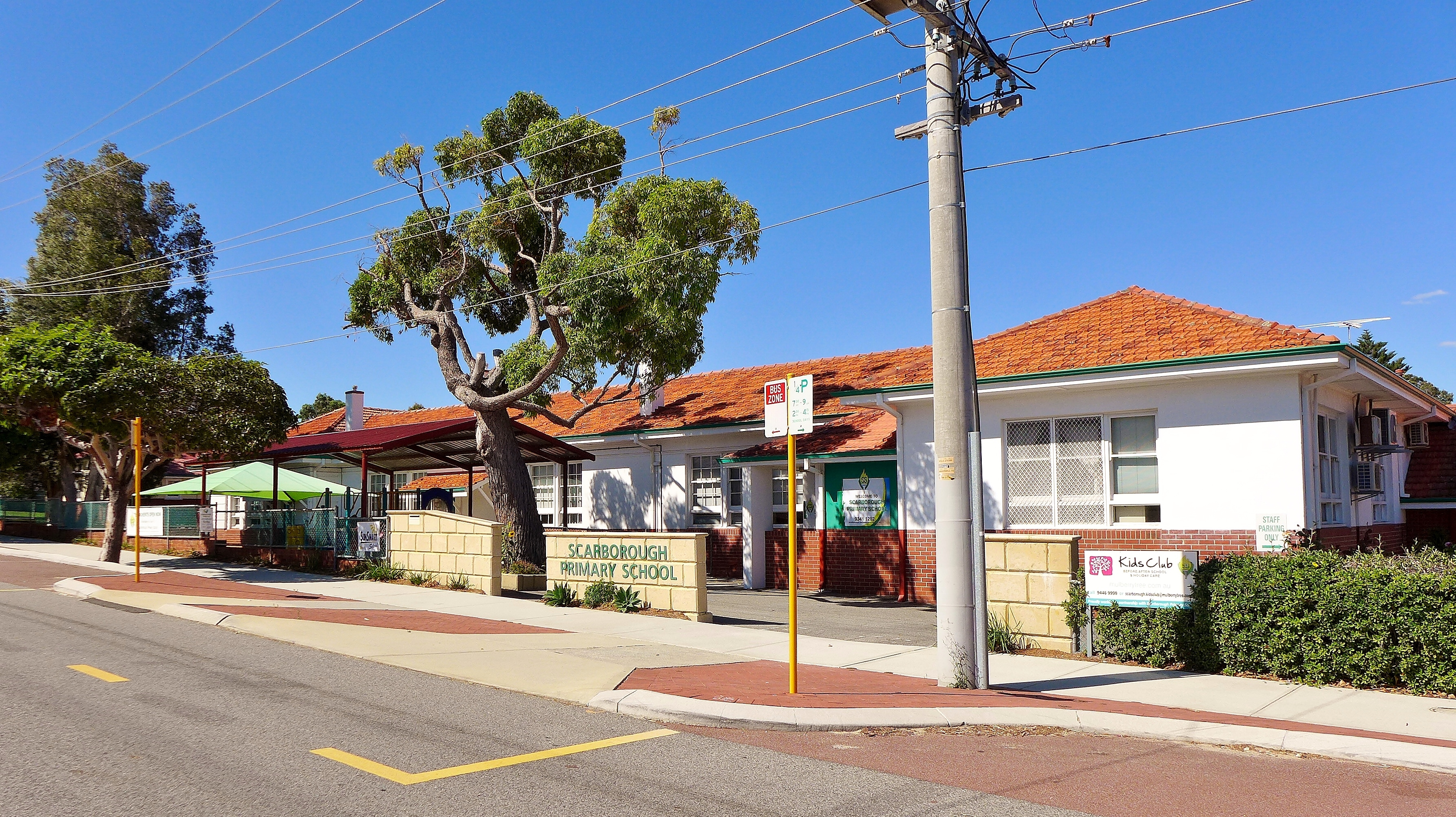
Scarborough Primary School

The schools in Scarborough are Scarborough Primary School on Deanmore Road and the Catholic School, St John’s Primary School on Scarborough Beach Road. Also nearby are Deanmore Primary School, St Mary’s School for Girls and the International School next to Doubleview Primary School just up the road.

The Japanese School in Perth was previously located in Scarborough.

== Politics ==
2019 federal election Source: AEC Scarborough (Stirling)
| Liberal | 50.66% |
| Labor | 25.52% |
| Greens | 18.53% |
| One Nation | 1.89% |
| Western Australia Party | 1.32% |

2019 federal election Source: AEC Scarborough Central (Stirling)
| Liberal | 42.91% |
| Labor | 30.78% |
| Greens | 17.54% |
| One Nation | 2.99% |
| United Australia Party | 2.43% |
