= Scarborough Beach bus station =

Bus station in Perth, Western Australia

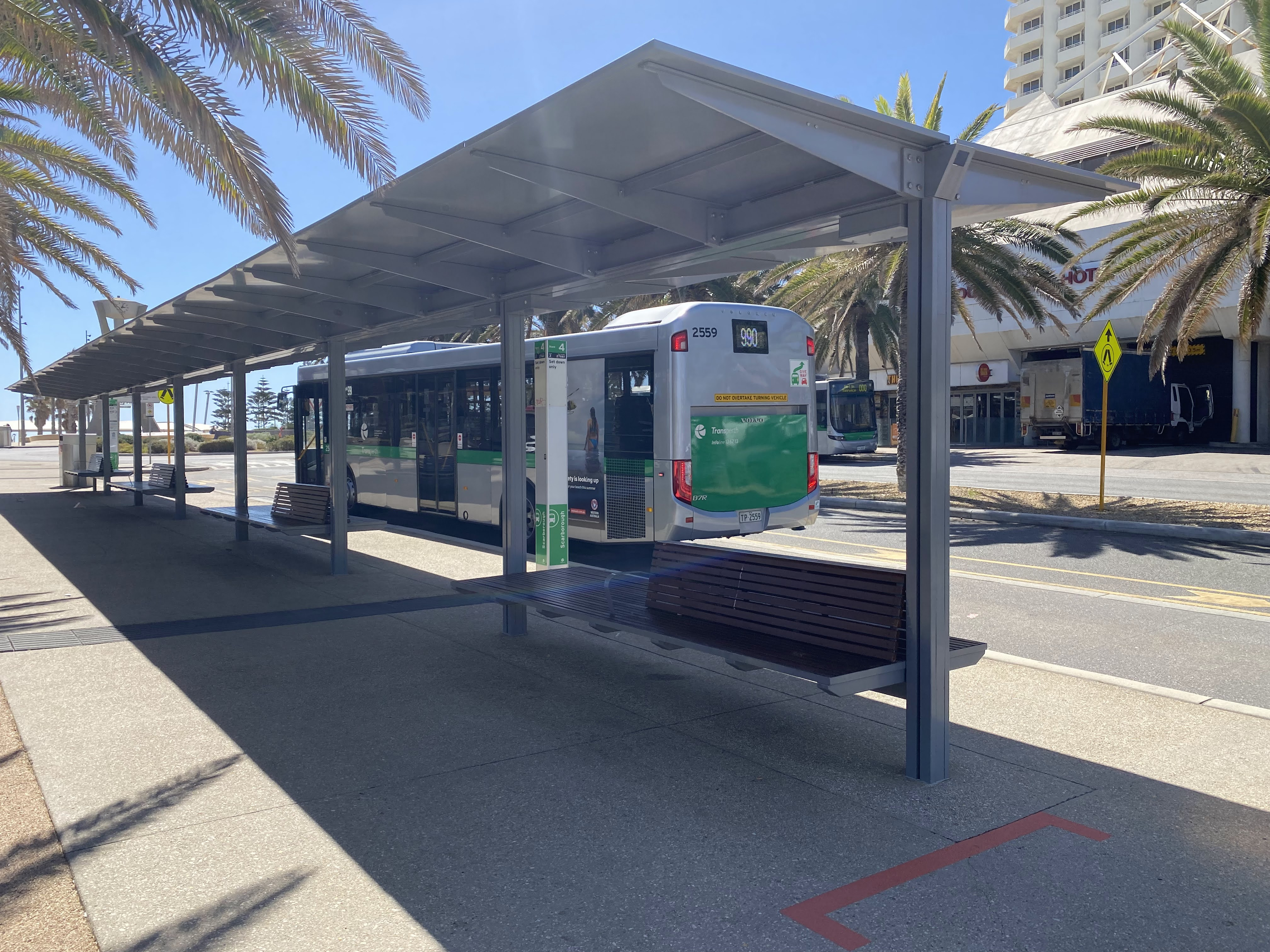
- Scarborough Beach bus station

General information
- Location: Scarborough Beach Road, Scarborough; Western Australia; Australia
- Coordinates: 31°53′39″S 115°45′24″E
- Owner: Public Transport Authority
- Operator: Transperth
- Bus routes: 6
- Bus stands: 4

Other information
- Fare zone: 2
Location

Scarborough Beach bus station in Western Australia is a Transperth bus station located at the west end of Scarborough Beach Road in Scarborough. It has four stands and is served by 6 Transperth routes operated by Swan Transit.

The bus station provides the bus services in Doubleview and Woodlands, and connects to Stirling and Glendalough Station, both part of the Yanchep Line. The bus station opened on 25 June 2017.

== Bus routes ==
| Stop | Route | Destination / description | Notes |
|---|---|---|---|
| Stand 1 | 990 | Perth Busport via Scarborough Beach Road and Glendalough Station | |
| Stand 2 | 421 | Stirling Station via Sackville Terrace | |
| Stand 2 | 422 | Stirling Station via Karrinyup Road | |
| Stand 3 | 410 | Stirling Station via Millcrest Street | |
| Stand 3 | 412 | Stirling station via Cobb Street and Rosewood Avenue | morning peak services departs from Hastings Street, Scarborough |
| Stand 3 | 420 Surf CAT | Stirling Station via Ellen Stirling Boulevard | |
| Stand 4 – Set down only | | | |

== Gallery ==
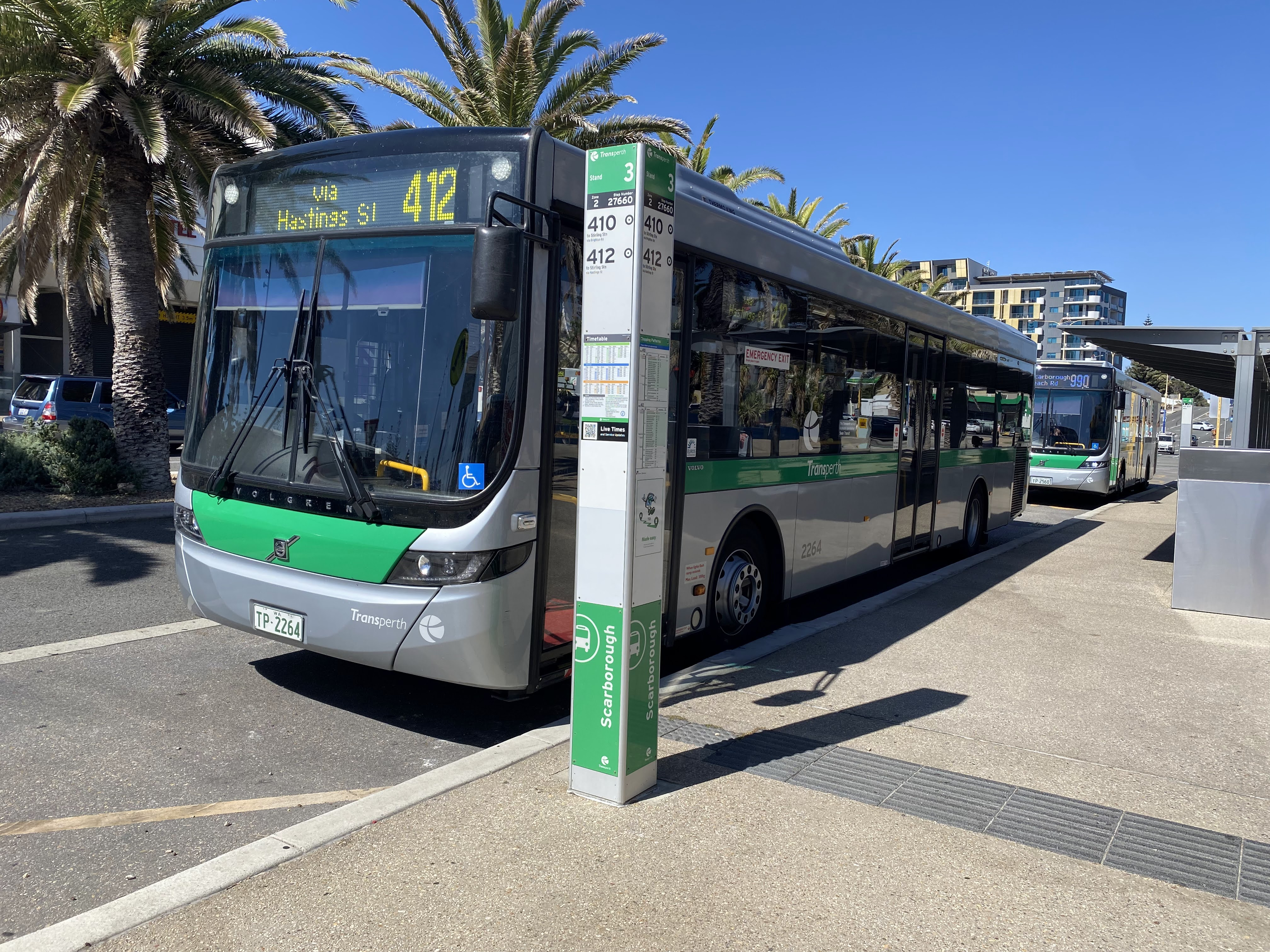
Bus routes 412 and 990

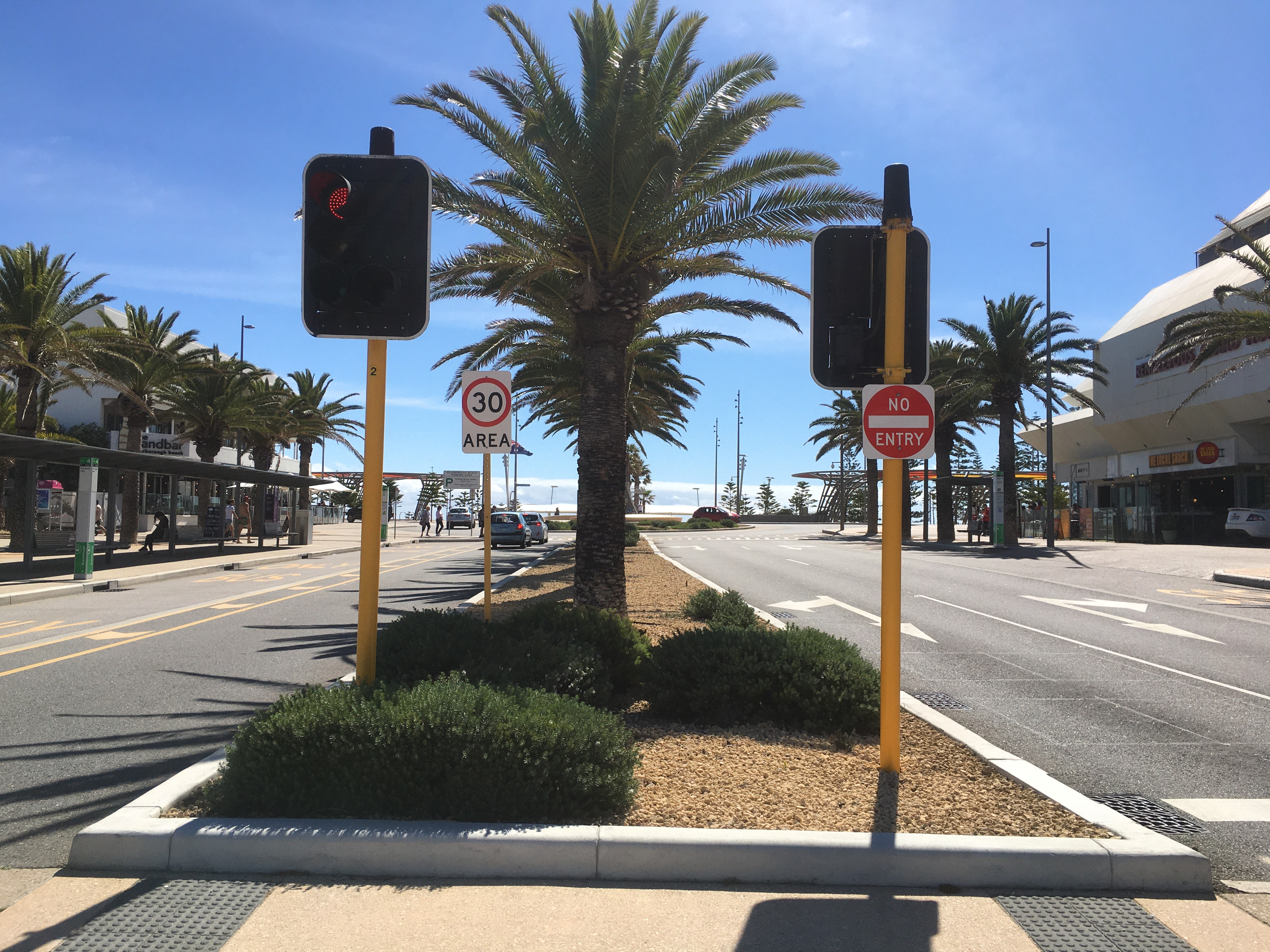
Looking at West

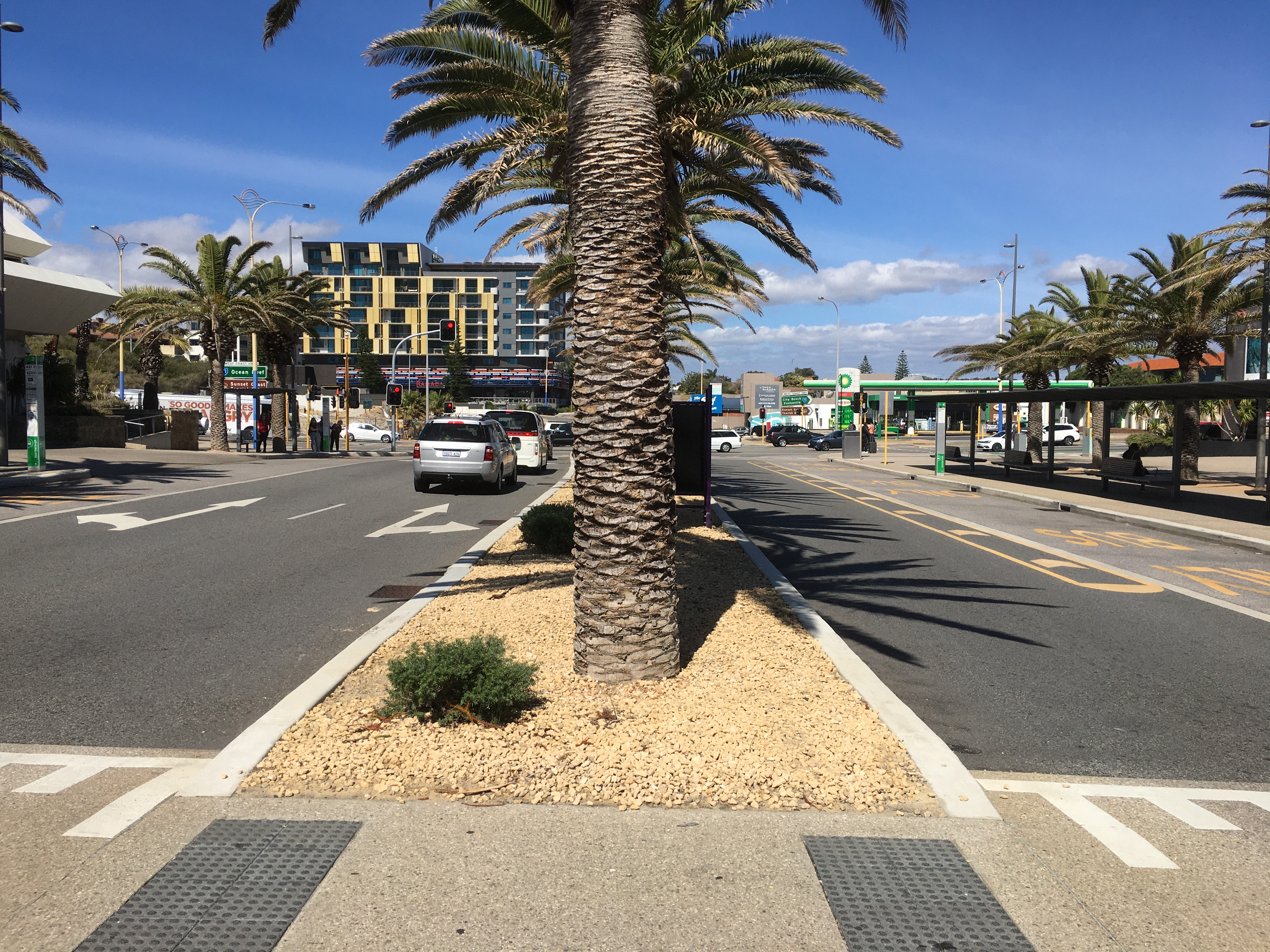
Looking at East
