= Stirling railway station, Perth =

Railway station in Perth, Western Australia

Stirling
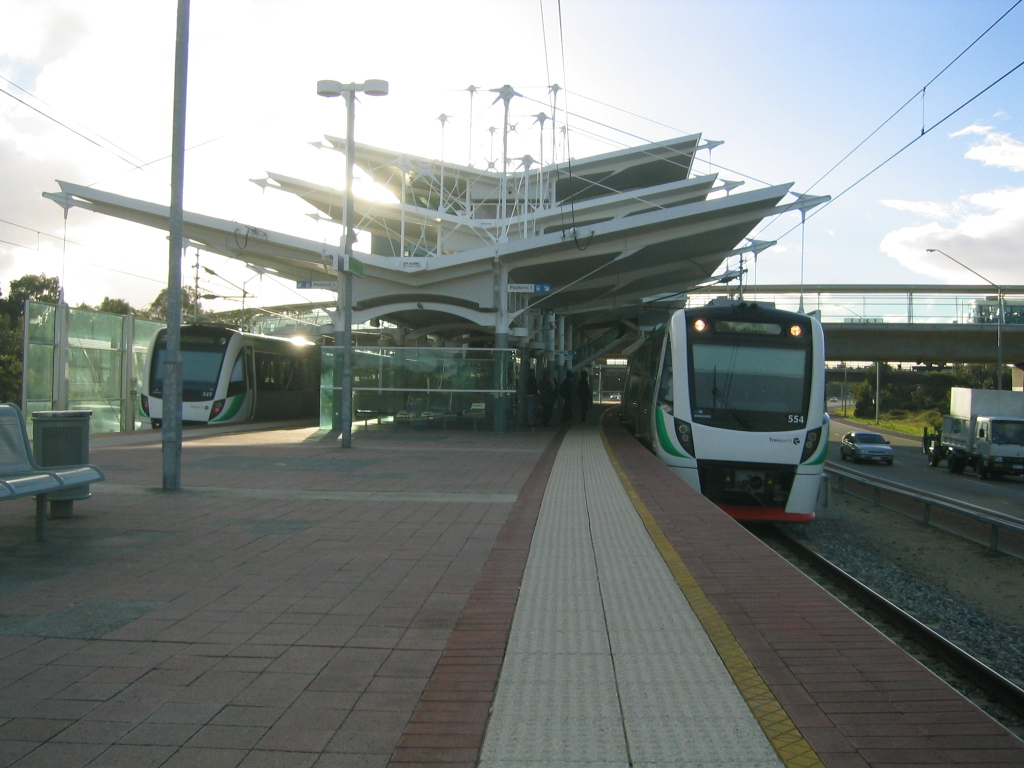
- Northbound view from Platform 1, with two Transperth B-series trains at both platforms, August 2005

General information
- Location: Mitchell Freeway, Stirling, Western Australia; Australia
- Coordinates: 31°53′39″S 115°48′16″E
- Owner: Public Transport Authority
- Operator: Public Transport Authority
- Line: Yanchep line
- Distance: 9.0 kilometres (5.6 mi) from Perth Underground
- Platforms: 2 (1 island)
- Tracks: 2

Construction
- Structure type: Ground
- Accessible: Yes

History
- Opened: 21 February 1993

Passengers
- 2026: 4,400 per day

Services
Preceding station	Transperth	Following station
Glendalough towards Elizabeth Quay via Perth Underground	Yanchep line	Warwick towards Yanchep
Location
- Location of Stirling station

Stirling railway station is a railway station on the Transperth network. It is located on the Yanchep line, nine kilometres from Perth Underground station serving the suburb of Stirling.

== History ==
Stirling station was built by Leighton Contractors. Due to construction delays, the station was not complete by the time the Northern Suburbs Railway opened in December 1992. It was opened on 21 February 1993. The line opened to peak hour service on 21 March 1993, upon which date the bus interchange at Stirling station opened as well.

Before Stirling was constructed, the Northern Suburbs Transit System considered a deviation of the rail alignment to directly service Innaloo and its shopping district. However, this idea was rejected by both the project coordinators and the public at large due to the significant cost, lack of identifiable benefits, and environmental impact. The station's location presented some interesting design challenges as the road reserve for the future Stephenson Highway ran in an area directly over the station at the southern end of its platforms. During the design of the station and its approach roads, the engineering firm Ove Arup & Partners was tasked with investigating and designing road layouts to accommodate for both future and current needs.

Innaloo bus station on Oswald Street was the terminus for most bus routes until 1992; these now terminate at Stirling station. A pair of crossovers link the two mainline tracks at the Perth end of the station, allowing the turnback of train services in the event of a disruption in either direction.

Stirling station won the Australian Institute of Architects' 1993 Sir Zelman Cowen Award for Public Architecture.

In 2003, the contract for extending the platforms on seven Joondalup line (now Yanchep line) stations, including Stirling station, was awarded to Lakis Constructions. The platforms on these stations had to be extended by 50 metres (160 ft) to accommodate 150-metre (490 ft) long six-car trains, which were planned to enter service. Along with the extensions, the platform edges were upgraded to bring them into line with tactile paving standards. Work on this station was done in mid-2004.

In August 2014, the passengers and staff at Stirling station worked together to free a man who became trapped between the platform and the train by pushing the carriage to tilt.

On 12 December 2020, the WA Government announced a $90 million upgrade to the Stirling Bus Interchange. The upgrade will increase the station's number of bus stands from 18 to 30, with the new stands to be built on a new bridge crossing the freeway. The new bus bridge and stands were opened in April 2026. The project went over budget, the final cost being $238.7 million. The original bus interchange reopened in August 2026 after a refurbishment.

== Services ==
Stirling station is served by Transperth Yanchep line services.

Stirling station saw 1,468,098 passengers in the 2013–14 financial year. In March 2018, Stirling station had approximately 4,700 boardings per weekday, making it the third busiest station on the Joondalup line. As of 2026, the station receives an average of 4,400 boardings per day.

== Platforms ==
Stirling platform arrangement
Stop ID	Platform	Line	Service Pattern	Destination	Via	Notes
99821	1	Yanchep line	All stations, K, W	Elizabeth Quay	Perth Underground	
99822	2	Yanchep line	All stations	Yanchep		
99822	2	Yanchep line	K	Clarkson		
99822	2	Yanchep line	W	Whitfords		W pattern only during weekday peak times

== Bus routes ==
Stop	Route	Destination / description	Notes
Stand 1	414	to Glendalough station via Balcatta & Main Street	
Stand 1	428	to Warwick station via Jones Street & Natalie Way	
Stand 1	904	Rail replacement service to Yanchep station	
Stand 1	904	Rail replacement service to Perth station	
Stand 2	415	to Mirrabooka bus station via Amelia Street & Ravenswood Drive	
Stand 2	420	Surf CAT to Scarborough Beach via Ellen Stirling Boulevard	
Stand 3	998	CircleRoute to Galleria Bus Station via Morley Drive & Dianella	Limited stops
Stand 4	999	CircleRoute to Fremantle station via Innaloo, Churchlands & Cottesloe	Limited stops
Stand 5	410	to Scarborough via Scarborough Beach Road	
Stand 5	412	to Scarborough Beach via Woodlands	
Stand 6	421	to Scarborough Beach via Doubleview	
Stand 6	423	to Warwick station via Karrinyup bus station & Hillarys Boat Harbour	
Stand 7	425	to Warwick station via Karrinyup bus station & Carine	
Stand 7	681	to Crown Perth, Burswood	
Stand 8	413	to Glendalough station via Osborne Park	
Stand 8	424	to Karrinyup bus station via Gwelup & North Beach	
Stand 8	427	to Warwick station via North Beach Road & Erindale Road	
Stand 9	402	to Perth Busport via Main Street & Loftus Street	
Stand 9	403	to Perth Busport via Royal Street & Loftus Street	
Stand 9	422	to Scarborough Beach via Huntriss Road & Karrinyup bus station	
