= North Beach Road =

Road in Perth, Western Australia

North Beach Road Western Australia
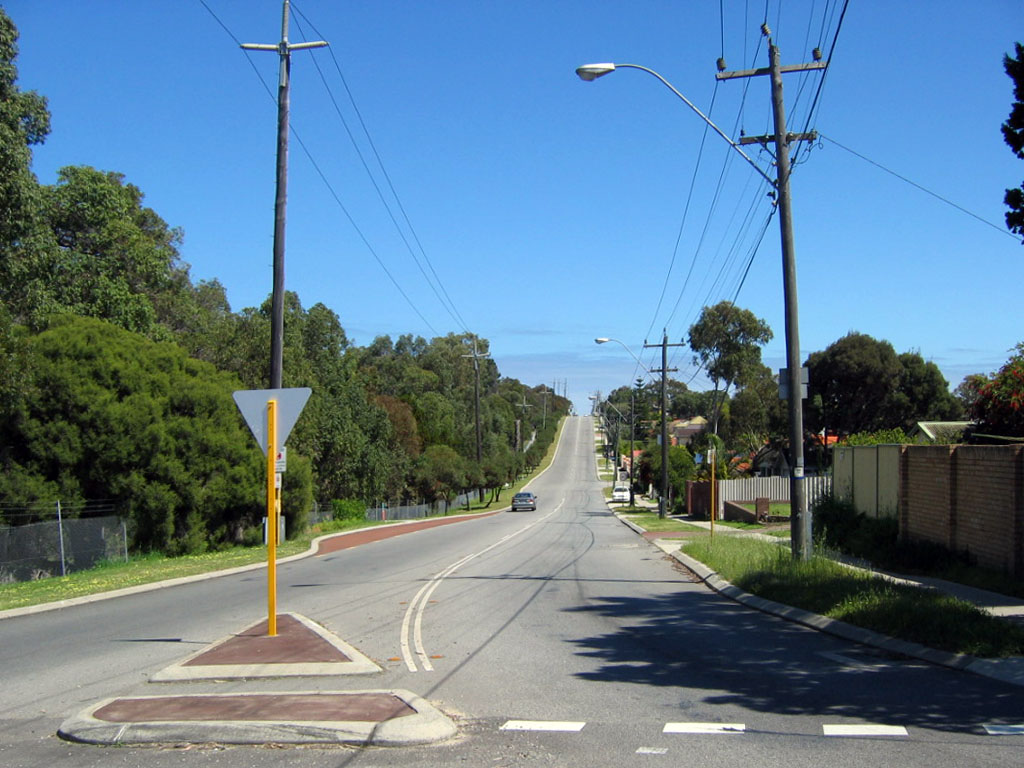
- View west of Duffy Road in Carine

General information
- Type: Road
- Length: 6 km (3.7 mi)
- Opened: 1920s
- Former route number: State Route 77 (Reid Highway to Erindale Road)

Major junctions
- Northwest end: West Coast Drive (Tourist Drive 204), North Beach
- Marmion Avenue (State Route 71); Reid Highway (State Route 3); Erindale Road
- Southeast end: Karrinyup Road (State Route76), Gwelup

Location(s)
- Major suburbs: Carine, Karrinyup, Gwelup

North Beach Road is a distributor road in the northern suburbs of Perth, Western Australia, running from Gwelup to North Beach. It is mostly a two-lane divided carriageway. The central section of the road, from Reid Highway to Erindale Road, was part of State Route 77 until its revocation in 2024. The route continued along Erindale Road, while North Beach Road heads south to Karrinyup Road.

While the road today is minor, discontinuous and choked by roundabouts and other traffic-calming devices, it was previously one of the first major roads in the area, originally built as a plank road serving tourists and holidaymakers staying in North Beach over the summer. It extended to Wanneroo Road along what is now Karrinyup Road and North Beach Drive, but has since been assimilated into several other major road alignments, including Erindale Road and Reid Highway.

In 2000, the road was effectively bypassed by the extension of Reid Highway to Marmion Avenue, built only 300 metres (980 ft) to the north. This made its use as a state route redundant and in March 2024 the decision was made to revoke State Route 77

Until the 1960s, it was known as Balcatta Beach Road, even though the suburb was always known as North Beach.

== Major intersections ==
The entire road's length is within the City of Stirling

Location	km	mi	Destinations	Notes
North Beach	0	0.0	West Coast Drive (Tourist Drive 204) – Watermans Bay, Trigg	Western terminus of western section at roundabout
North Beach	0.5	0.31	Kitchener Street	Roundabout
North Beach	0.7	0.43	Groat Street	Roundabout
North Beach	1.0	0.62	Charles Riley Road	Roundabout
Carine, Karrinyup, North Beach, Watermans Bay quadripoint	1.6	0.99	Marmion Avenue (State Route 71) – Yanchep, Hillarys, Scarborough, Cottesloe	Signalised intersection. Eastern terminus of western section of North Beach Road. Vehicles must travel 300 m along Reid Highway in order to connect between the two sections
Carine, Karrinyup boundary	1.9	1.2	Reid Highway (State Route 3)	Western terminus of section at T junction
Carine, Karrinyup boundary	2.3	1.4	Milverton Avenue	T junction
Carine, Karrinyup boundary	2.6	1.6	Clement Drive	Roundabout
Carine, Karrinyup boundary	3.0	1.9	Okely Road	Roundabout
Gwelup, Carine, Karrinyup tripoint	3.7	2.3	Duffy Road north / Balcatta Road east	Roundabout. Through traffic must turn here
Gwelup	5.4	3.4	Erindale Road – Balcatta, Hamersley, Perth	Signalised intersection. Through traffic must turn here. Access to Mitchell Freeway southbound
Gwelup	5.5	3.4	Porter Street	Roundabout
Gwelup	6.0	3.7	March Street west / Salvin Road east	Roundabout
Gwelup, Innaloo boundary	6.8	4.2	Karrinyup Road (State Route 76) – Trigg, Karrinyup, Dianella, Morley	Southern terminus at signalised T-intersection. Access to Mitchell Freeway
1.000 mi = 1.609 km; 1.000 km = 0.621 mi Note: Intersections with minor local roads are not shown

View approaching the West Coast Drive, North Beach
