= Warwick Road =

Road in Perth, Western Australia

Warwick Road Western Australia

General information
- Type: Road
- Length: 5.6 km (3.5 mi)
- Opened: 1969
- Route number(s): State Route 81

Major junctions
- West end: Marmion Avenue (State Route 71), Sorrento
- Mitchell Freeway (State Route 2); Erindale Road (State Route 77)
- East end: Wanneroo Road (State Route 60 / State Route 81), Greenwood

Location(s)
- Major suburbs: Duncraig, Warwick, Greenwood

Warwick Road is an arterial east–west road located in the northern suburbs of Perth, Western Australia.

== History ==
Warwick Road was built in 1969 to service the Shire of Wanneroo parts of the Hamersley Development Scheme, which was later split into the suburbs of Duncraig, Warwick and Greenwood. Its original alignment, which was gazetted in 1949 as Road No. 10578 by the Wanneroo Road Board, was a straight east–west road extending to Alexander Drive, but in the mid-1970s, the alignment was altered southwards in the vicinity of the freeway alignment in preparation for connecting to the Mitchell Freeway when it was extended 1986. In the late 1970s, the section east of Wanneroo Road was split off to form Marangaroo Drive.

Apart from the Glengarry and Greenwood neighbourhood shopping centres, Warwick Road also passes Warwick Open Space east of Erindale Road and the Percy Doyle Reserve, which includes sports and recreation facilities and the Duncraig Library, near Marmion Avenue.

Renamed segments of the old alignment include Arnisdale Road west of the freeway, Tuart Road east of the freeway, and Mereworth Way/Warwick place east of Wanneroo Road. There is also a small, discontinuous, segment west of the intersection west of Marmion Avenue.

== Major intersections ==
View westbound from Coolibah Drive

View eastbound from Erindale Road

All intersections listed below are traffic light-controlled unless otherwise indicated.

LGA	Location	km	mi	Destinations	Notes
Joondalup	Sorrento	−0.5	−0.31	Parnell Avenue	Western terminus of minor road section
Joondalup	Sorrento-Marmion boundary	0.0	0.0	Justin Drive north / Keppell Road south	Eastern terminus of minor road section
Joondalup	Marmion–Sorrento–Duncraig tripoint	0.0	0.0	Marmion Avenue (State Route 71) – Yanchep, Craigie, Carine, Scarborough	Western terminus of arterial road section. State Route 81 western concurrency terminus
Joondalup	Duncraig	1.7	1.1	Glengarry Drive	
Joondalup	Duncraig	2.2	1.4	Davallia Road	
Joondalup	Duncraig-Greenwood-Warwick tripoint	2.7– 2.9	1.7– 1.8	Mitchell Freeway (State Route 2) – Butler, Joondalup, Stirling, Perth	Signalised diamond interchange favouring Mitchell Freeway
Joondalup	Greenwood-Warwick boundary	3.4	2.1	Dorchester Avenue	Access to Warwick Grove Shopping Centre
Joondalup	Greenwood-Warwick boundary	3.8	2.4	Coolibah Drive	
Joondalup	Greenwood-Warwick boundary	4.9	3.0	Cockman Road north / Erindale Road south – Hamersley, Balcatta, Gwelup	
Joondalup–Wanneroo boundary	Girrawheen-Greenwood-Warwick tripoint	5.6	3.5	Wanneroo Road (State Route 60 / State Route 81 north) – Hamersley, Balcatta, Gwelup	Eastern terminus of arterial road section
1.000 mi = 1.609 km; 1.000 km = 0.621 mi: Concurrency terminus; Route transition; Note: Intersections with minor local roads are not shown
