= Reid Highway =

Highway in Perth, Western Australia

Reid Highway Western Australia
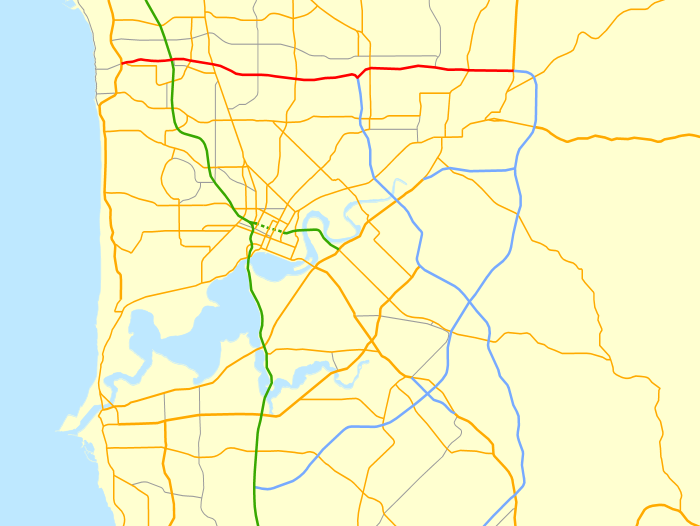
- Map of Perth's central suburbs with Reid Highway highlighted in red

General information
- Type: Highway
- Length: 23.6 km (15 mi)
- Opened: 1980s
- Route number(s): State Route 3

Major junctions
- West end: Marmion Avenue (State Route 71), North Beach
- Mitchell Freeway (State Route 2); Wanneroo Road (State Route 60); Tonkin Highway (State Route 4); Great Northern Highway (National Highway 95 / National Route 1 / Tourist Drive 203)
- East end: Roe Highway (National Highway 95 / State Route 3), Middle Swan

Location(s)
- Major suburbs: Balcatta, Mirrabooka, Malaga, Beechboro, Caversham

Highway system
- Highways in Australia; National Highway • Freeways in Australia; Highways in Western Australia

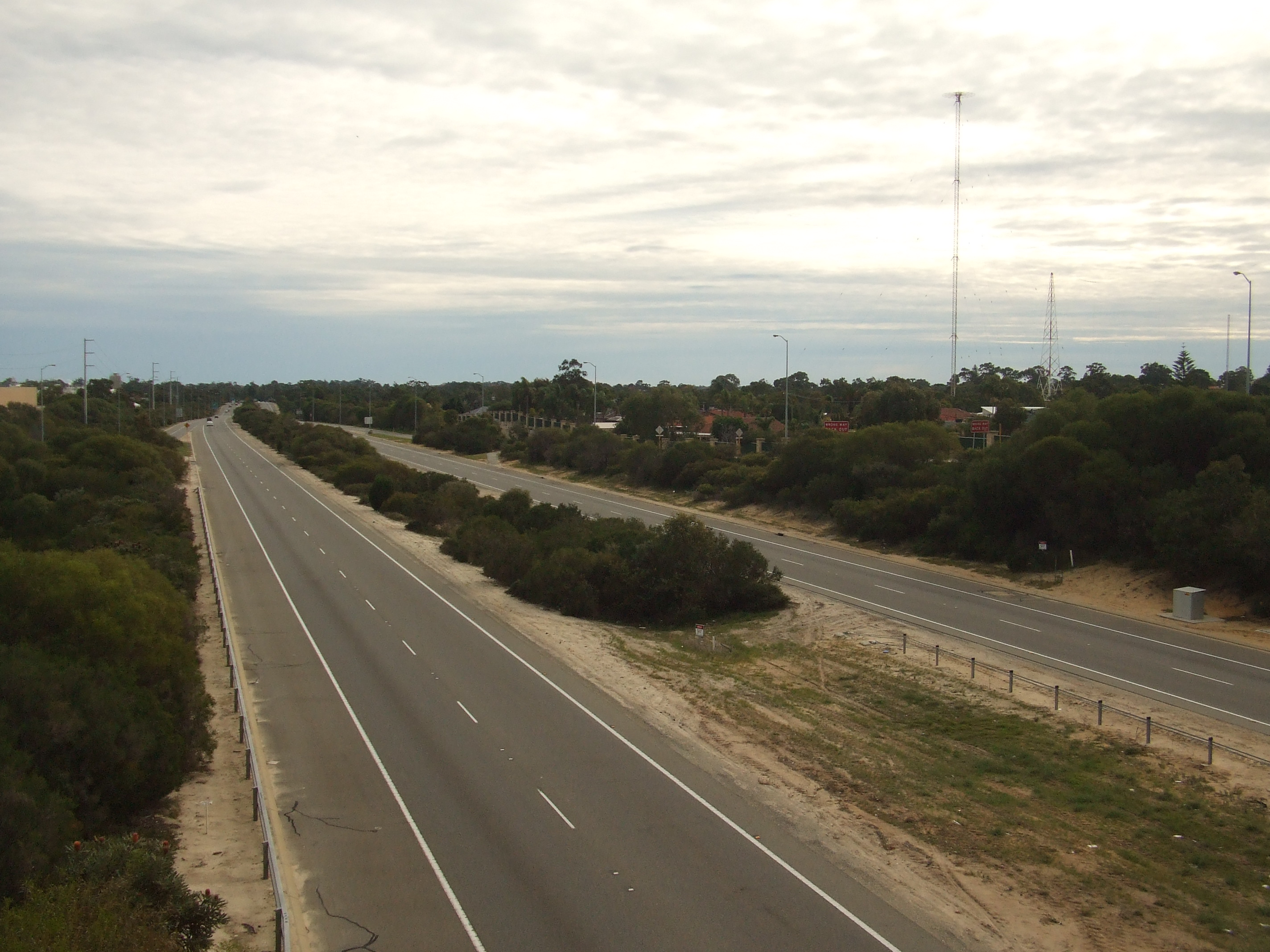
View from Wanneroo Road, facing west

Reid Highway is a 23-kilometre (14 mi) east-west highway and partial freeway in the northern suburbs of Perth, Western Australia, linking North Beach with Middle Swan. As part of State Route 3, it forms half of Perth's outer ring road along with Roe Highway, which it joins onto at its eastern terminus.

The highway has many different speed limits and road conditions along its length, but is predominantly a four-lane dual carriageway with a 90 km/h (56 mph) speed limit. A 12-kilometre (7 mi) section, between Erindale Road and Altone Road (which makes up just over half the highway's length), is a continuous freeway. In conjunction with Tonkin Highway, it serves as an important arterial connection between Perth's coastal and eastern suburbs, industrial areas and Perth Airport.

== History ==
Reid Highway was initially proposed in the late 1960s as the "North Perimeter Highway", and a small two-lane section was built in early 1986 between Erindale Road and the-then newly extended Mitchell Freeway. In 1989 it was subsequently renamed "Reid Highway", in honour of former Western Australia Governor Gordon Reid.

The next section was built between Alexander Drive and Malaga Drive, and opened on 6 September 1991. A segment linking Malaga Drive to Tonkin Highway opened later that year, on 11 November 1991, with further extensions west to Mirrabooka Avenue and east to Beechboro Road opening two months later, on 11 February 1992.

The highway was further extended with the section between Mirrabooka Avenue and Wanneroo Road, which opened on 17 November 1994. The highway was finally made continuous on 6 September 1996 with the opening of the Erindale Road–Wanneroo Road segment. A short time later, it was extended eastwards to West Swan Road. This section, which opened on 25 November 1996, provided a connection to Great Northern Highway and Roe Highway via Middle Swan Road, an existing local road.

In 2001, the highway was extended west from Mitchell Freeway to Marmion Avenue as a two-lane divided carriageway, which opened on 30 July, thus replacing a section of North Beach Road and making it discontinuous. This extension was highly controversial as it passes through the environmentally sensitive Carine wetlands and the Lake Carine region, which includes a vital turtle habitat. Concerns about environmental damage prompted construction delays, and slight alterations to the route.

Criticism of the quality and capacity of the highway has also been an issue. Reid Highway in Westminster (between Wanneroo Road and Mirrabooka Avenue) has no street lighting and has attracted both antisocial behaviour and a number of accidents. The stretch between Beechboro Road and West Swan Road has been similarly criticised, and the area east of the Mitchell Freeway was prone to heavy congestion due to its limited capacity as a two-lane single carriageway, before being upgraded to dual carriageway.

A four-lane dual carriageway extension of Reid Highway from West Swan Road to Great Northern Highway and Roe Highway was opened on 26 February 2010, completing State Route 3 as a highway-grade ring road around Perth. The extension runs parallel to Middle Swan Road, which has been retained as a local access road. Middle Swan Road is of a relatively poor standard and capacity, and is viewed as a safety blackspot.

In 2011, the highway's traffic-light intersections at Alexander Drive and Mirrabooka Avenue were both upgraded to diamond interchanges, with bridges being constructed to carry highway traffic. Along with the similarly grade-separated Wanneroo Road interchange, this completed an 8 kilometre section of grade-separated, free traffic flow between the industrial estates of Balcatta and Malaga.

The T junction at Lord Street was upgraded to a traffic light controlled intersection in 2012, with four through lanes and improved turning lanes on Reid Highway. This intersection now includes Daviot Road as a southern continuation of Lord Street, which provides access to the suburb of Caversham. Lord Street has since been renamed Drumpellier Drive as a result of the New Lord Street project in 2019.

The RAC has lobbied for continued improvements to Reid Highway, calling for grade-separation at the Malaga Drive intersection, and to make the highway a dual carriageway for its entire length. The WA State Government initially did not commit to further major upgrades, instead funding an upgrade to the turning lanes at the Malaga Drive intersection. In December 2012, the State Government announced that the Malaga Drive intersection would be grade separated by 2014–15, with work commencing in 2013-14. The project uses the same diamond interchange design that was constructed at Alexander Drive and Mirrabooka Avenue in 2011. Construction started on this interchange in 2015, and was completed in 2016.

Works were completed in 2016 to upgrade the Mitchell Freeway diamond interchange to dual carriageway with a second overpass bridge, extra turning lanes, and a new looped freeway ramp. The project aims to lower congestion, and reduce the volume of traffic using local roads to avoid the interchange. The works also included upgrading the Duffy Road South intersection to traffic light control, and widening highway to the west of Duffy Road, as well as duplicating it from Duffy Road to Erindale Road.

From early 2017 to mid-2019, works were performed as part of the NorthLink WA project to convert the intersection of Reid and Tonkin Highway to the first combination interchange in Western Australia, which also resulted in the access to Beechboro Road North removed (a flyover was built in its place) and the road duplicated to Altone Road. Tonkin Highway was extended north as the carriageway for the new Perth Darwin National Highway. The previous Tonkin Highway intersection was unusual in that Tonkin Highway, which continues as Reid Highway west of the intersection, is the continuous section of the T junction. This allowed those following the road from the west to continue down Tonkin Highway southbound, along with Tonkin northbound continuing into Reid westbound, with those wishing to follow Reid Highway from any direction having to make a direct turn to continue either eastbound or westbound.

Reid Highway is now a dual carriageway for its entire length, with the last remaining section of single carriageway east of Mitchell Freeway, between Altone Road and West Swan Road, converted to dual carriageway in mid-2020. Part of the features included a bridge connecting the northern and southern sections of Arthur Street and a second right-turning bay from Reid Highway westbound to West Swan Road northbound.

Reid Highway construction stages 1986 to 1996

== Future ==
In December 2019, funding was assigned for developing a project for full grade separation of the last remaining signalised intersection on the section between the Mitchell Freeway and Tonkin Highway, at Erindale Road.

As part of the EastLink WA project, the intersections with Altone Road, Daviot Road/Drumpellier Drive, West Swan Road and the Great Northern Highway will be grade-separated, forming a continuous freeway east of Erindale Road, continuing down the Roe Highway forming a freeway loop of Perth.

== Route description ==
View eastbound from Marmion Avenue

Reid Highway runs between Marmion Avenue, North Beach, and Great Northern Highway, Middle Swan, where it becomes Roe Highway. West of Marmion Avenue, the highway becomes North Beach Road (west).

Beginning at an intersection with Marmion Avenue, the highway extends Eastwards to Mitchell Freeway with at-grade intersections into North Beach Road, Everingham Street, Okely Road and Duffy Road. The Mitchell Freeway interchange is a modified diamond interchange consisting of dual two-lane bridges over the freeway and railway line with two parclo cloverleaf loops serving the Reid-westbound to Mitchell-northbound traffic as well as that of the southbound entrance. The eastern half of the interchange also has connects to Balcatta Road, similar to the Great Eastern Highway/Brearley Avenue Interchange prior to the modifications made in 2018. As the interchange is built on a reservation with the capacity to be expanded into a full freeway to freeway interchange, this connection is likely to be removed when this occurs. Further on from the Mitchell/Reid Interchange, there is an at-grade intersection with Erindale Road. This intersection marks the western terminus of the freeway standard section of Reid Highway, with a diamond interchange at Wanneroo Road, which goes over Reid Highway. Conversely, the diamond interchanges at Mirrabooka Avenue, Alexander Drive and Malaga Drive all see the highway travelling over the top of the arterial roads.

The highway then enters an S-curve to reorient itself further north while also rising to pass over Tonkin Highway in the form of a combination interchange; with the Tonkin-northbound to Reid-eastbound and Tonkin-southbound to Reid-westbound movements being served by cloverleaf loops. The offset of the highway means that Reid Highway passes over the Reid-eastbound to Tonkin-southbound and Reid-westbound to Tonkin-northbound ramps prior to the main Tonkin Highway carriageway itself.

The road then passes under a bridge carrying Beechboro Road North after which the eastern terminus of the freeway standard section is reached at the signalised intersection with Altone Road. Following this are signalised intersections with Drumpellier Drive (formerly Lord Street)/Daviot Road, West Swan Road and Great Northern Highway. Between Drumpellier Drive/Daviot Road and West Swan Road is an overpass connecting Arthur Street. In between West Swan Road and Great Northern Highway there is access to Middle Swan Road through two LILO T junctions that are connected by an underpass. These LILO intersections are signposted as "temporary access". Alternative access will be required in the future, as Reid Highway is planned to be upgraded to a six lane freeway. Great Northern Highway is the eastern terminus of the Highway where it continues eastwards as Roe Highway, which in turn links to Kwinana Freeway, forming a ring road around Perth.

== Interchanges and intersections ==
The entire highway is located in the Perth Metropolitan Region.

LGA	Location	km	mi	Destinations	Notes
Stirling	Carine, Karrinyup, North Beach, Watermans Bay	0	0.0	Marmion Avenue (State Route 71) – Hillarys, Scarborough	Highway terminus: continues west as North Beach Road
Stirling	Carine, Karrinyup	0.3	0.19	North Beach Road (east) – Carine, Karrinyup	T junction (south)
Stirling	Carine	0.8	0.50	Everingham Street – Carine	T junction
Stirling	Carine	1.3	0.81	Okely Road – Carine, Duncraig	Traffic light controlled T junction
Stirling	Carine	2.0	1.2	Duffy Road (north) – Carine	T junction
Stirling	Carine	2.2	1.4	Duffy Road (south) – Gwelup	Traffic light controlled T junction
Stirling	Carine, Hamersley, Balcatta	2.8– 3.2	1.7– 2.0	Mitchell Freeway (State Route 2) northbound ramps – Joondalup	Modified diamond interchange (Mitchell Freeway free flowing) with freeway entrance ramps looped. Traffic lights at each intersection.
Stirling	Carine, Hamersley, Balcatta	2.8– 3.2	1.7– 2.0	Mitchell Freeway (State Route 2) southbound ramps (north) / Balcatta Road (south) – Perth, Balcatta	Modified diamond interchange (Mitchell Freeway free flowing) with freeway entrance ramps looped. Traffic lights at each intersection.
Stirling	Balcatta, Hamersley	4.2	2.6	Erindale Road – Perth City (via Mitchell Freeway), Balcatta, Warwick	Future folded diamond interchange
Stirling	Balcatta, Balga, Hamersley, Westminster	5.5	3.4	Wanneroo Road (State Route 60) – Perth, Wanneroo	Diamond interchange
Stirling	Balga, Mirrabooka, Westminster	8.2	5.1	Mirrabooka Avenue – Mirrabooka, Nollamara	Diamond interchange
Bayswater, Stirling, Swan	Dianella, Mirrabooka, Malaga, Noranda	10.4	6.5	Alexander Drive (State Route 56) – Dianella, Malaga	Diamond interchange
Bayswater, Swan	Malaga, Noranda	11.1	6.9	Malaga Drive – Malaga, Noranda	Diamond interchange
Bayswater, Swan	Beechboro, Malaga, Noranda	13.0	8.1	Tonkin Highway (State Route 4) – Morley, Ellenbrook, Perth Airport	Combination interchange since 2019 as part of the NorthLink WA project. Previously Reid Highway eastbound continued south as Tonkin Highway while Reid Highway westbound intersected at a traffic light controlled T Junction
Swan	Beechboro, Bennett Springs	13.7	8.5	Beechboro Road North (State Route 53)	Replaced with a flyover since 2019 as part of the NorthLink WA project. Previously a traffic light controlled instruction
Swan	Beechboro, Bennett Springs	15.9	9.9	Altone Road – Beechboro	Roundabout interchange under construction
Swan	Caversham, West Swan	18.1– 18.2	11.2– 11.3	Bennett Brook Bridge	
Swan	Caversham, West Swan	18.8	11.7	Drumpellier Drive (north) / Daviot Road (south) – Ellenbrook, Whiteman Park	Drumpellier Drive was formerly Lord Street until July 2019, completion of the New Lord Street project resulted in the name change.; Roundabout interchange under construction
Swan	Caversham, West Swan	20.6	12.8	West Swan Road (State Route 52 / Tourist Drive 203) – Guildford, Upper Swan, Swan Valley	Future interchange to begin construction in 2027
Swan	Caversham, West Swan	21.9– 22.1	13.6– 13.7	Middle Swan Road (north) / Harris Road (south) – Caversham, Bandyup Women's Prison	Temporary access via staggered LILO T junctions
Swan	Caversham, Middle Swan, West Swan	23.0– 23.3	14.3– 14.5	Whiteman Bridge (over Swan River)	
Swan	Middle Swan	23.4	14.5	Yule Avenue – Saint Mary's Church	At-grade intersection; intersection to be removed and rerouted to Great Northern Highway
Swan	Middle Swan	23.7	14.7	Great Northern Highway (National Highway 95 north / National Route 1 / Tourist Drive 203) – Midland, Moora, Geraldton, Meekatharra	Highway terminus: continues east as Roe Highway (National Highway 95 / State Route 3); proposed single-point interchange (SPUI)
1.000 mi = 1.609 km; 1.000 km = 0.621 mi: Closed/former; Incomplete access

== See also ==
- Highways in Australia
- List of highways in Western Australia
