= Erindale Road =

Road in Perth, Western Australia

Erindale Road Western Australia
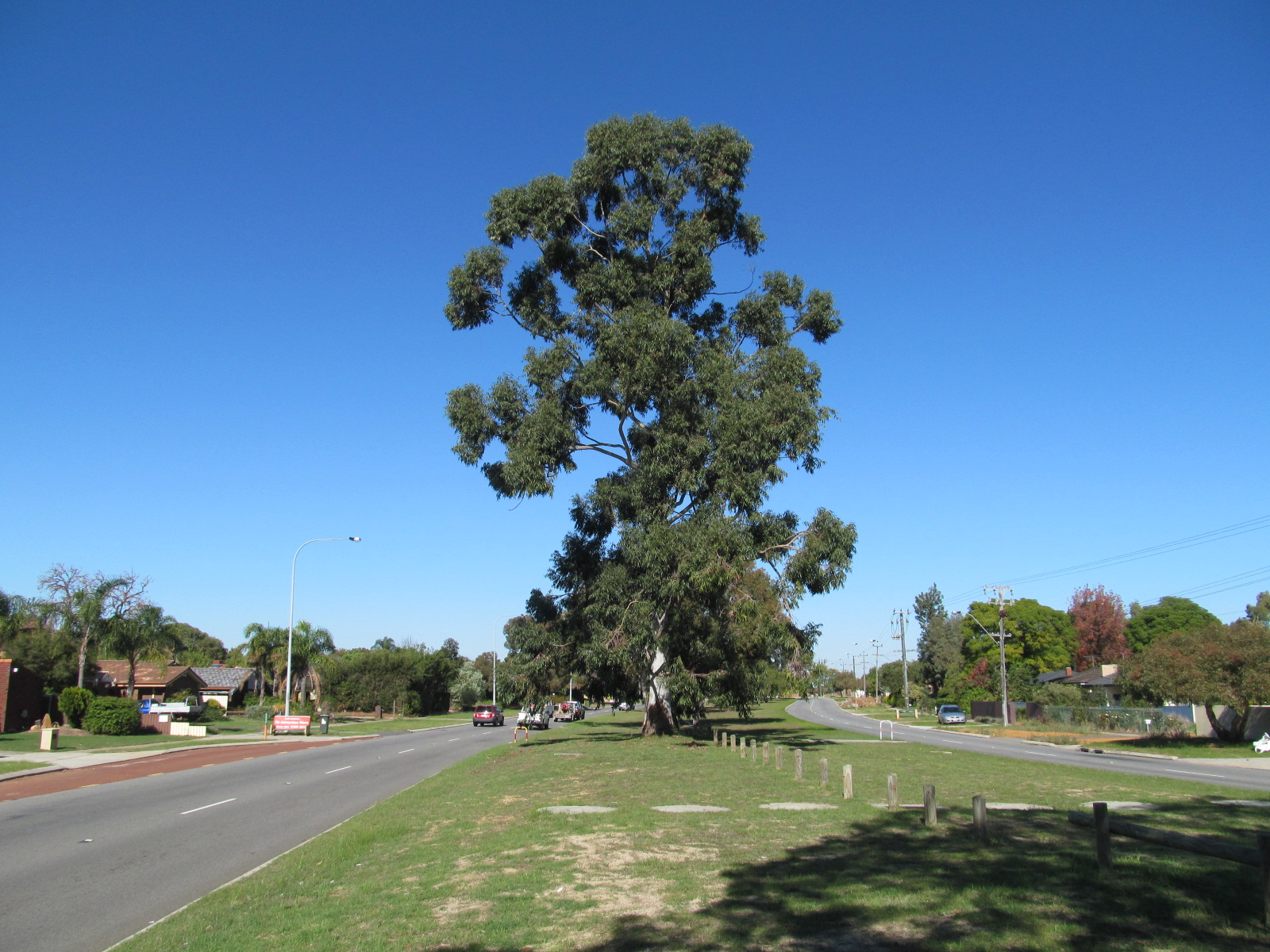
- View south from Hamersley

General information
- Type: Road
- Length: 5.4 km (3.4 mi)
- Opened: 1960s
- Former route number: State Route 77

Major junctions
- Northeast end: Warwick Road (State Route 81), Warwick
- Reid Highway (State Route 3); Balcatta Road (State Route 78); Mitchell Freeway (State Route 2)
- Southwest end: North Beach Road , Gwelup

Location(s)
- Major suburbs: Hamersley, Balcatta

Erindale Road is a connector road in the northern suburbs of Perth, Western Australia, providing residents of the suburbs of Hamersley and Warwick with a connection to Reid Highway and Mitchell Freeway. The road is a dual carriageway with two lanes in each direction for most of its length, and continues from Warwick Road as Cockman Road through Greenwood, and from the Gwelup end as North Beach Road.

== History ==
Historically, the part north of Balcatta Road was known as Allen Street (Road No.5), which continued diagonally to meet Wanneroo Road near present-day Culloton Crescent, and the part south of Balcatta Road was known as Odin Road, and was continuous with Odin Drive. Prior to the construction of the freeway through the area in 1984, Odin Road continued through the Karrinyup Road intersection to Innaloo along present-day Odin Road.

When the route shields were introduced to Perth in 1986, Erindale Road was assigned State Route 77. However, the eventual construction of Reid Highway as the main east-west link in northern Perth caused Erindale Road's importance as an arterial road to decline and in March 2024 State Route 77 was revoked.

== Description ==
Erindale Road passes the eastern end of the Centro Warwick regional shopping centre and is one of the two main roads (along with Balcatta Road) within the Balcatta light industrial area. Until the upgrade of the Reid Highway/Mitchell Freeway interchange, Erindale Road also carried all city-bound traffic from Hamersley and Warwick.

In peak periods, parts of the road are clogged with traffic, and the road is a reference point on Perth radio traffic reports.

== Major intersections ==
All intersections listed are controlled by traffic lights unless otherwise indicated.

LGA	Location	km	mi	Destinations	Notes
Joondalup	Greenwood-Warwick boundary	0.0	0.0	Warwick Road (State Route 81) – Sorrento, Duncraig, Girrawheen	Northern terminus. Continues as Cockman Road northbound
Joondalup	Warwick	0.9	0.56	Ellersdale Avenue	Roundabout
Joondalup–Stirling boundary	Warwick-Hamersley boundary	1.3	0.81	Beach Road – Marmion, Duncraig, Mirrabooka, Malaga	
Stirling	Hamersley-Balcatta boundary	2.6	1.6	Reid Highway (State Route 3) – Joondalup, Morley, Midland, Perth Airport	
Stirling	Balcatta	3.0	1.9	Balcatta Road	
Stirling	Balcatta-Stirling boundary	3.8	2.4	Ledgar Road westbound / Delawney Street eastbound	
Stirling	Balcatta-Stirling boundary	4.0	2.5	Boya Way	Roundabout, connects to Odin Drive.
Stirling	Balcatta-Stirling-Gwelup tripoint	4.4	2.7	Mitchell Freeway (State Route 2) – Perth, Rockingham, Mandurah	Southbound entry & northbound exit only
Stirling	Gwelup	5.4	3.4	North Beach Road – Carine, Karrinyup, North Beach	Western terminus, continues as North Beach Road westbound.
1.000 mi = 1.609 km; 1.000 km = 0.621 mi: Incomplete access; Note: Intersections with minor local roads are not shown
