= Mitchell Freeway =

Freeway in Perth, Western Australia

Mitchell Freeway Western Australia
- Map of Perth's northern suburbs with the Mitchell Freeway highlighted in red

General information
- Type: Freeway
- Length: 41.5 km (26 mi)
- Opened: 1973
- Route number(s): State Route 2

Major junctions
- South end: Kwinana Freeway (State Route 2)
- Graham Farmer Freeway (State Route 8); Reid Highway (State Route 3)
- North end: Romeo Road

Location(s)
- Major suburbs / towns: Perth, Leederville, Osborne Park, Gwelup, Warwick, Duncraig, Kingsley, Joondalup, Clarkson, Butler, Alkimos

Highway system
- Highways in Australia; National Highway • Freeways in Australia; Highways in Western Australia

The Mitchell Freeway is a 41.5-kilometre-long (25.8 mi) freeway in the northern suburbs of Perth, Western Australia, linking central Perth with the city of Joondalup. It is the northern section of State Route 2, which continues south as Kwinana Freeway and Forrest Highway. Along its length are interchanges with several major roads, including the Graham Farmer Freeway and Reid Highway. The southern terminus of the Mitchell Freeway is at the Narrows Bridge, which crosses the Swan River, and the northern terminus is at Romeo Road in Alkimos.

Planning for the route began in the 1950s, and the first segment in central Perth was constructed between 1967 and 1973. Named after Sir James Mitchell, the freeway has been progressively extended north since then. In the 1970s, the first two extensions were completed, up to Hutton Street in Osborne Park. By the end of the 1980s, the freeway had reached Ocean Reef Road in Edgewater. The Yanchep line was constructed in the freeway median in the early 1990s. This necessitated the relocation of a section of the southbound carriageway, and the construction of three new bridges. In conjunction with these works, additional lanes were constructed in the realigned section.

Since the 1990s, extensions to the Mitchell Freeway have taken it to Romeo Road in Alkimos, which is the freeway's terminus as of July 2023. Further works are planned, which will eventually take the freeway past Yanchep and Two Rocks to the boundary of the Perth metropolitan region.

== Route description ==
Mitchell Freeway southbound through Perth to the Narrows Bridge (where it becomes Kwinana Freeway)

The Mitchell Freeway is the northern section of State Route 2. It commences at the northern end of the Narrows Bridge, Perth, continuing from Kwinana Freeway, and terminates north of the satellite city of Joondalup at Romeo Road, Alkimos. All intersections with the freeway are via grade separated interchanges. The speed limit is 100 kilometres per hour (60 mph) except in central Perth, where the limit is 80 kilometres per hour (50 mph). South of Hepburn Avenue, the freeway has 3 to 5 lanes in each direction. From that point north, there are mostly two lanes in each direction, expanding to three lanes between Hodges Drive and Shenton Avenue. For much of its length the median strip of the freeway also houses the Yanchep line, with nine of the line's stations and the Nowergup depot built on the strip. Additionally, a shared pedestrian and bicycle path is built alongside most of the freeway.

=== Perth and West Perth ===
Mitchell Freeway interchanges in central Perth
- Northbound
- Southbound
- Mitchell Freeway
- Entrance ramp
- Exit ramp

The section near the Perth city centre, within the City of Perth local government area (LGA), features many partial access interchanges. The Narrows Interchange is located just north of the Narrows Bridge, on the eastern edge of Kings Park. This is a hybrid interchange connecting the freeway with Mounts Bay Road and Riverside Drive, over a distance of 800 metres (2,600 ft). There is complete access to and from Mounts Bay Road via a standard northbound exit ramp and looped ramps for the other movements. There is a partial Y-interchange incorporated for direct access to and from Riverside Drive via a southbound exit ramp and a northbound entrance ramp. All other traffic movements must be made via Mounts Bay Road. The Riverside Drive entrance ramp merges with the Mounts Bay Road northbound entrance ramp. The southbound exit ramp is similarly shared, before diverging for three destinations: Mounts Bay Road, Riverside Drive, and the Perth Convention and Exhibition Centre car park. The main northbound exit to Hay Street is via an access road, which begins on the Mounts Bay Road exit ramp. The access road rejoins the freeway as an outside lane on the shared Riverside Drive and Mounts Bay Road entrance ramp. The Hay Street exit ramp, a short distance later, can be accessed from the two outermost lanes. This allows the traffic entering the freeway from the ramp to continue north or exit at Hay Street without weaving.

The freeway continues north-westerly for 240 metres (790 ft), splitting Mount Street in half, and passing under Malcolm Street. After this, it turns north-easterly for 500 metres (1,600 ft), and lines up with the city blocks between George and Elder streets, a pair of one way frontage roads. The freeway also marks the boundary between Perth and West Perth. Partial access is provided to or from all the roads that the freeway crosses over or under. North of Roe Street, the freeway turns north-west towards Glendalough over the course of 1.1 kilometres (0.7 mi). In this section the freeway marks the boundary between the City of Perth and City of Vincent LGAs. There is a full Y-interchange here, the Hamilton Interchange, with the Graham Farmer Freeway, which bypasses the Perth city centre via a tunnel, and provides access to Perth Airport. Combined with this interchange is a partial Y-interchange with Charles Street. The southbound entrance ramp merges with, and northbound exit ramp diverges from, the Graham Farmer Freeway ramps. There is a traffic light controlled intersection with Newcastle Street at the northern end of these ramps. Charles Street is the start of State Route 60, an alternative route to Perth's northern suburbs and areas north of the Perth metropolitan region. Located in the vicinity of these interchanges are the Sutherland Street northbound entrance ramp, from West Perth, and a southbound exit ramp to both Roe Street, and Wellington Street, Perth. The Loftus Street overpass, near the northwestern end of the Graham Farmer Freeway ramps, is the edge of the City of Perth LGA; beyond this point the freeway is the boundary between West Leederville in the Town of Cambridge and Leederville in the City of Vincent.

=== Northern suburbs of Perth ===
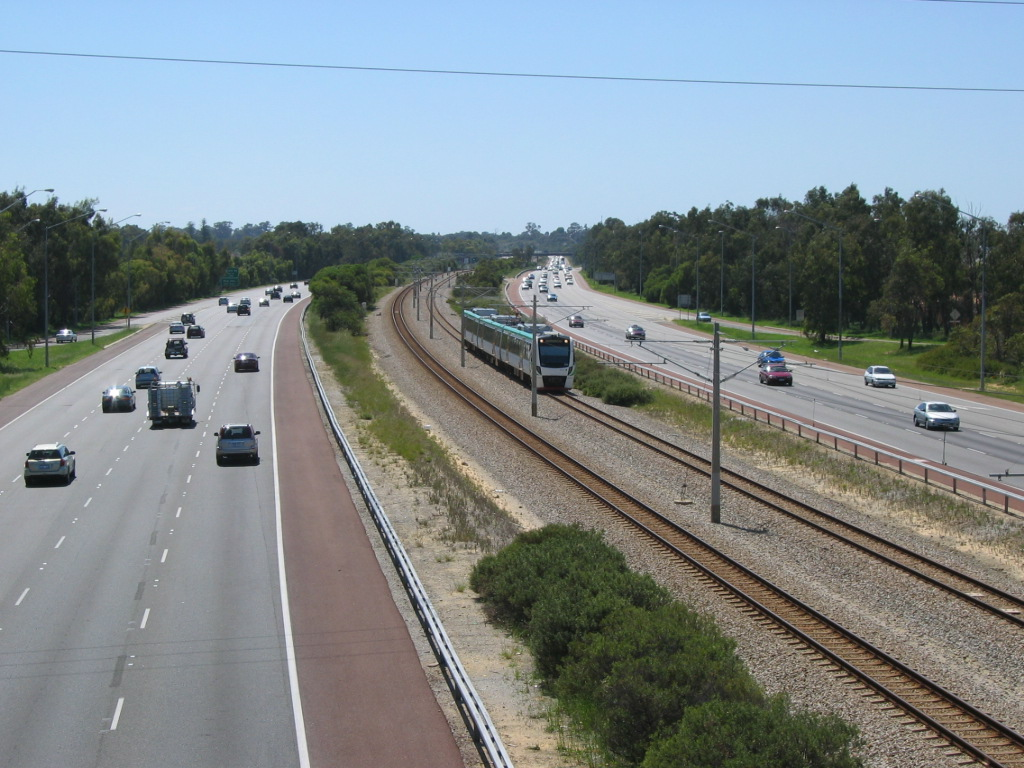
View north of Karrinyup Road

In the northern suburbs of Perth, most of the interchanges are standard diamond interchanges, and the rest are modified versions, which have ramps missing or replaced with loop ramps. The first interchange 0.9 kilometres (0.6 mi) north-west of West Perth, is with Vincent Street and Lake Monger Drive. This interchange has a looped southbound entry ramp, so that Leederville Parade can join to the south side of intersection with Vincent Street and the southbound ramps. The northbound exit ramp terminates at Southport Street, 200 metres (660 ft) south of Vincent Street and Lake Monger Drive. The freeway then proceeds northwest for 1.9 kilometres (1.2 mi) alongside Lake Monger's eastern edge, after which there is a half diamond interchange with Powis Street, with only a northbound exit ramp and a southbound entrance ramp. The freeway continues north, now within the City of Stirling LGA, through Osborne Park, until it reaches Hutton Street after 2.4 kilometres (1.5 mi). There are several local roads in Osborne Park that have T-Junction intersections with the freeway ramps south of Hutton Street. These are McDonald Street West and Hector Street West, with the northbound exit ramp; and Cape Street, Hector Street, and McDonald Street with southbound entry ramps. The freeway has a 3.2-kilometre (2.0 mi) S-curve after Hutton Street, moving to an alignment further west that does not bisect any suburbs. The interchanges with Cedric Street on the S-curve, and Karrinyup Road at the end of the S-curve, are diamond interchanges. There are slight modifications to the entrance and exit ramps between these roads, which merge for 500 metres (0.31 mi), requiring traffic to weave. As of 2026, the Cedric Street intersection will be replaced by a diamond intersection with Stephenson Avenue. The curved section is the boundary between Stirling to the east of the freeway, and Osborne Park and Innaloo to the west.

The next interchange, after 1.6 kilometres (1.0 mi), is with Erindale Road. It is another half diamond interchange, with only northbound exit and southbound entrance ramps. Beyond Erindale Road, the suburb to the east of the freeway is Balcatta, and 1.3 kilometres (0.8 mi) further north is Reid Highway, with the southbound and westbound-to-northbound entry ramps looped. Balcatta Road joins the intersection of the southbound ramps with Reid Highway. Reid Highway, together with Tonkin Highway, provides a limited-access route to Perth Airport. North of Reid Highway, the Mitchell Freeway divides Carine to west from Hamersley to the east. There is no access to the next major road, Beach Road. It forms the border between the City of Stirling and City of Joondalup LGAs; as well as between Carine and Duncraig west of the freeway, and Hamersley and Warwick to the east. Warwick Road's interchange is 2.1 kilometres (1.3 mi) north of Reid Highway. It is a standard diamond interchange, but weaving is required between Reid Highway and Warwick Road due to the short distance between the interchanges. Greenwood is located north of Warwick Road and east of the freeway.

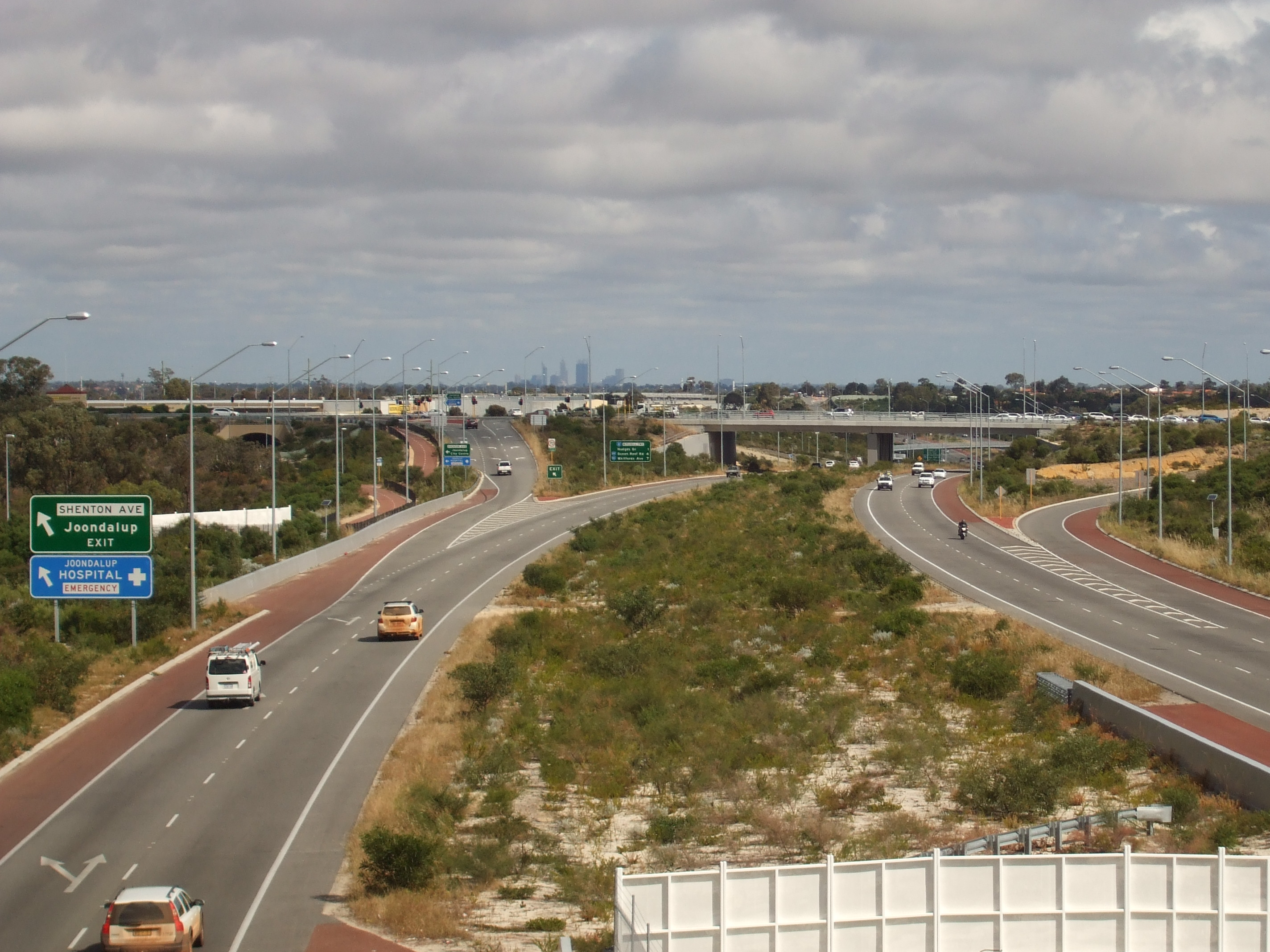
View south of Moore Drive

The following two interchanges, after 2.6 kilometres (1.6 mi) and 2.1 kilometres (1.3 mi) respectively, are with Hepburn Avenue and Whitfords Avenue. The Hepburn Avenue interchange is located at the corners of Duncraig, Greenwood, Kingsley, and Padbury; while the Whitfords Avenue interchange is located at the corner of Kingsley, Padbury, Cragie, and Woodvale. Each interchange also provides access for the railway stations in the median (Greenwood and Whitfords respectively) via the southbound entry ramps, which are two-way north of the carparks' entrances. North of here, over a distance of 7 kilometres (4.3 mi), are standard diamond interchanges with Ocean Reef Road, Hodges Drive, and Shenton Avenue, which provide access to Joondalup city centre, and Joondalup Health Campus, east of the freeway. West of the freeway are the suburbs of Heathridge, Connolly and Currambine. Edgewater station lies just to the north of the Ocean Reef Road interchange (road access via Joondalup Drive), with the railway deviating to the east from the median just south of Hodges Drive to stop at Joondalup station.

350 metres (1,150 ft) north of the Shenton Avenue interchange, the railway line re-enters the freeway median just prior to passing under Moore Drive. Both the freeway and railway then pass over Burns Beach Road, 1 kilometre (0.6 mi) further north with the Currambine station lying 200 metres (660 ft) to the south. The diamond interchange with Burns Beach Road is the northernmost fully signalised interchange on the freeway and lies at the corner of Currambine, Joondalup, Kinross and Neerabup. The next interchange, after 3.5 kilometres (2.2 mi), is with Neerabup Road and is a hybrid interchange where the western side is a teardrop roundabout common to dogbone interchanges while the eastern side is a full roundabout similar to a dumbbell interchange. The next interchange is reached 2.7 kilometres (1.7 mi) north at Hester Avenue at a partial dogbone interchange.

After Hester Avenue, the northbound and southbound carriageways split and pass around the Nowergup railway depot before reaching the next interchange at Lukin Drive, after which the railway again deviates from the freeway median, this time to the west to continue on to Butler station and beyond to Yanchep. The next interchange is with Butler Boulevard, and 1 kilometre (0.6 mi) later, the freeway terminates at Romeo Road. Access to areas further north is provided by Marmion Avenue to the west of the terminus or via Wanneroo Road to the east.

== History ==
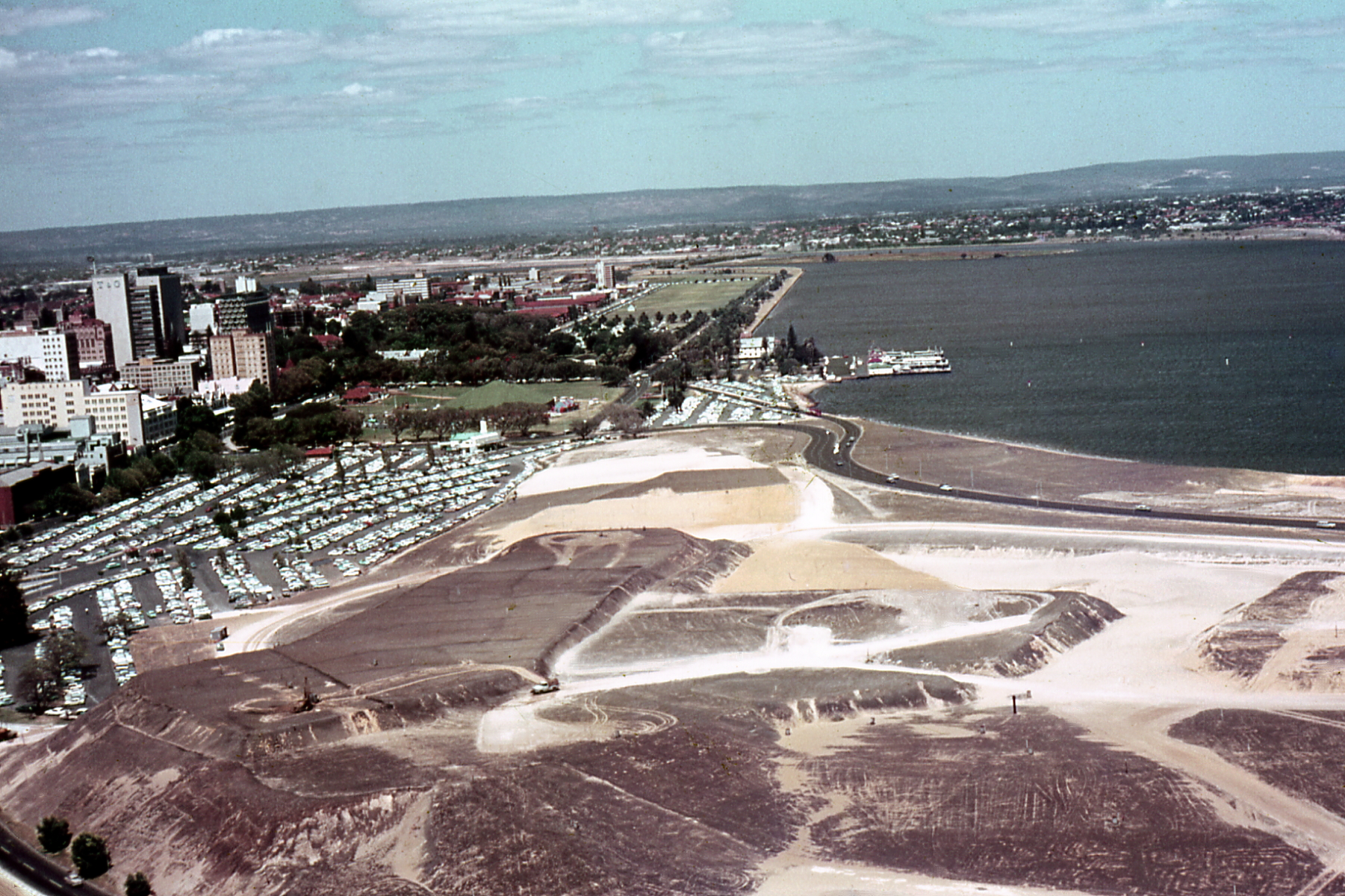
Narrows Interchange under construction, c. 1968

The Mitchell Freeway began as a highway proposed in the Metropolitan Region Scheme in the mid-1950s. The original plan took the route, then known as Yanchep Highway, inland from what is now known as Karrinyup Road to the intersection of Wanneroo Road and Balcatta Road. However, the first gazetted edition of the Metropolitan Region Scheme, from 1963, shows a controlled-access highway along the current freeway alignment. The later plan only detailed the route up until a point east of Sorrento, at a proposed east-west controlled-access highway on the modern day Hepburn Avenue alignment.

Detailed design on the first stage of the freeway, from the Narrows Bridge to Sutherland Street at the northern edge of the city, began in 1960, and took several years to be completed. The design included a complex interchange at the Narrows Bridge that was to be built on reclaimed land that was mostly soft mud. Ground improvement works, which included the installations of 43,000 sand drains, began in 1964; demolition of buildings in the freeway's path commenced in 1965. The freeway was completed in three sections, under three separate contracts. Construction on the central section from Mount Street to Wellington Street started on 18 November 1966, following a groundbreaking ceremony conducted by Premier David Brand. It was opened to traffic two years later, connected to the Narrows Bridge via a temporary Bailey bridge over Mounts Bay Road. The new road carried up to 1400 vehicles per hour during peak hours.

Work on the section north of Wellington Street, known as the Hamilton Interchange, began in October 1969. It was partially opened on 17 November 1971, but was not completed until 4 October 1972. The final part of the project to be completed was the Narrows Interchange. Construction began in 1970 with the installation of thirteen caissons, which would house foundation columns. Placement of the caissons was difficult; as well as sinking vertically as intended, they also tilted and slid horizontally. Corrections were made by selective excavation, blasting bedrock, and applying tension via guy-wires. Following the foundation works, construction proceeded swiftly; most of the work was completed by 1972. Premier John Tonkin opened the interchange on 30 November 1973. This initial section functioned only as a distributor for Narrows Bridge traffic accessing Perth's central business district or adjacent areas to the north-west. Whilst initially referred to as the "Western Switch Road", it was renamed after the former Western Australian Premier and Governor Sir James Mitchell, on 5 June 1963. In 2008, Stage 1 was declared a National Engineering Landmark by Engineers Australia as part of its Engineering Heritage Recognition Program.

Several stages were built through the late 1970s, 1980s and early 1990s. The first extension of the freeway was nearly a mile long (1.6 km), taking the freeway to Vincent Street. This stage also included a long, curving bridge, eight-span bridge connecting northbound traffic to Charles Street. The construction of this stage, which began in February 1974, resulted in the suburb of Leederville being split in two. Residential and industrial buildings were demolished, and streets were cut off on both sides of the freeway's path. The extension opened to traffic on 8 March 1976, having cost $15.15 million. It was opened by the state Minister for Transport, Ray O’Connor. A commemorative plaque was located under the bridge leading to Charles Street.

The design of Stage 3 of the freeway, a 4.8-kilometre (3.0 mi) section extending to Hutton Street, was completed in 1974. The existing soil was not suitable for construction, as the area generally consisted of soft peat and old landfills. In 1975, the ground was consolidated with 720,000 cubic metres (25,000,000 cu ft) of sand. Construction took place between 1976 and 1978, with the section opened by the Minister for Transport, David Wordsworth, on 2 June 1978. A commemorative plaque was unveiled at the Powis Street bridge. This stage cost $12.5 million, and received the Institution of Engineers Australia's Western Australian Division Engineering Excellence Award in 1978.

After a four-year gap, construction of Stage 4 began, which would take the freeway to Erindale Road. The first half of the stage, up to Karrinyup Road, opened on 12 December 1983, while the project wasn't complete until 21 September 1984. It was opened by the state Minister for Transport, Julian Grill. This section completed 24 kilometres (15 mi) of freeway in Perth, from Bull Creek to Balcatta. The next two stages were constructed together, extending the freeway to Hepburn Avenue. Stage 5 was from Erindale to Warwick Road, and involved excavating a large quantity of material, including 600,000 tonnes (1.3 billion pounds) of limestone. That stage cost $22.73 million, while Stage 6 only cost $8.06 million. Both stages were opened together, on 6 August 1986. The first stage of Reid Highway (then known as the North Perimeter Highway) was built at the same time, and opened on 16 May 1986. A further extension to Ocean Reef Road was opened on 2 July 1988 by the Federal Minister for Transport, Peter Morris, at a cost of $17.5 million. The state and federal governments provided most of the funds, $9.7 million and $5.2 million respectively. The City of Wanneroo contributed $1.3 million, Joondalup Development Corporation $1 million, and land developers $300,000, as they wanted the freeway built ahead of schedule to stimulate local development.

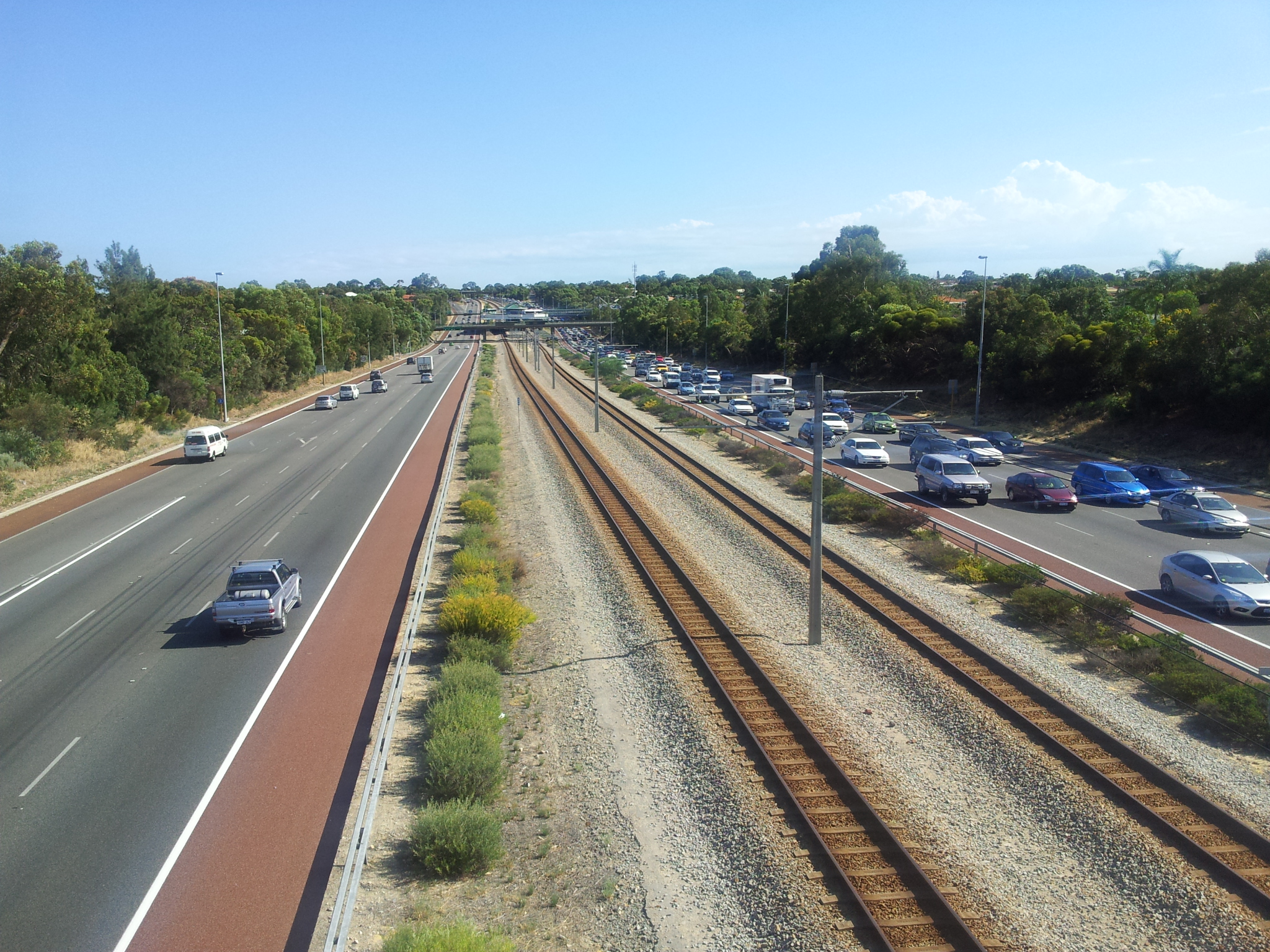
The Joondalup line in the freeway median

In 1991 and 1992, the median strip of the entire freeway was significantly widened to accommodate the Yanchep line, being built under the Northern Suburbs Transit System project. The line was to be located in the middle of the road reserve, between the freeway carriageways. At the time, the northbound and southbound carriageways, between Loftus Street and McDonald Street, were positioned next to each other, with space for future widening located on the eastern side of the road reserve. Initially, three new road bridges were constructed over Vincent Street, Powis Street, and Scarborough Beach Road. Once the road bridges had been completed and surfacing works completed, the southbound carriage was relocated, creating the required space for the railway construction. Additional lanes were constructed in the realigned section, funded from regular road funding sources, whilst the bridges and some associated works were included as part of the costs for the Northern Suburbs Transit System project.

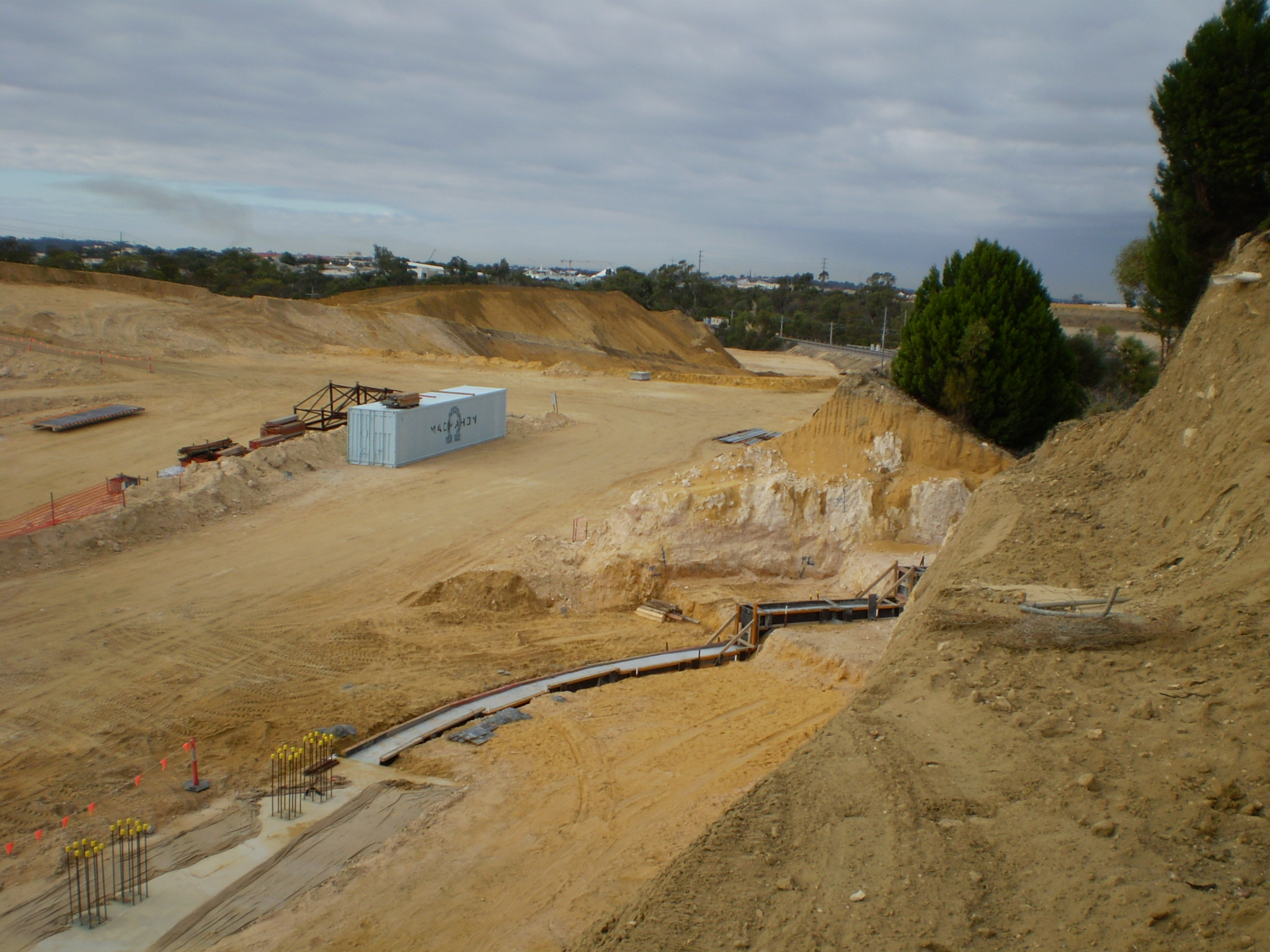
Mitchell Freeway Extension: work in progress at Moore Drive, Joondalup (May 2007)

After a 7-year-hiatus, a 3-kilometre (1.9 mi) extension to Hodges Drive was opened by Premier Richard Court in December 1999, two months ahead of schedule. The project also included widening the section between Karrinyup Road and Hepburn Avenue to three lanes in each direction.

After another 7-year-hiatus, construction began on a 4-kilometre extension to Burns Beach Road, with a diamond interchange at Shenton Avenue and an overpass for Moore Drive. Local residents were opposed to aspects of the initial plans, such as the design of a section near a primary school and the clearing of native vegetation. The state government therefore established the Community Consultative Working Group and later the Construction Reference Group, composed of members of the local community. The input from these groups resulted in several changes to the design. The project was managed by Main Roads in conjunction with Macmahon Contractors. Construction of the extension was initially planned for May 2006, but began on 14 December 2006. By July 2008, 90% of the works had been completed and the new section was predicted to open in September 2008. However, the official opening was not until 2 November 2008, when the road was opened by Western Australia's Minister for Transport, Simon O'Brien, and the previous Minister for Planning and Infrastructure Alannah MacTiernan. The $160 million project was completed $10 million under budget. The opening was celebrated with a procession of vintage cars along the new freeway segment.

In its 2011/12 budget, the State Government committed $30 million for the widening of the Mitchell Freeway northbound between Hepburn Avenue and Hodges Drive from two to three lanes. Traffic volumes in the preceding years had increased rapidly, almost reaching the previously projected 2016 traffic volume of 40,000 vehicles per day. The resulting congestion in the afternoon traffic peak increases the chances of rear-end crashes as well as driver frustration. Construction of the third lane began in February 2013, the 4.5-kilometre (2.8 mi) section from Hepburn Avenue to Ocean Reef Road opened in August 2013 with the remaining section to Hodges Drive completed in early 2014. As part of the project, the existing lanes were resurfaced during the summer months of 2013–14.

The freeway was also expanded further during 2013 with an extra lane northbound between Perth and Hutton Street, in conjunction with works to increase the capacity of the Graham Farmer Freeway tunnel. Works progressed in two stages, with Vincent Street as the midpoint. As part of the project, the overpasses at Powis Street, Vincent Street and Scarborough Beach Road were widened. An additional slip lane was constructed, from the Graham Farmer Freeway's Loftus Street exit ramp to the Mitchell Freeway northbound, to access Vincent Street without changing lanes to the left lanes of the Mitchell Freeway northbound. The project commenced in February 2013 and was completed in December 2013.

In October 2012 the state government announced that the freeway's interchange with Reid Highway would be upgraded with the installation of extra turning lanes and traffic lights. The project was an interim solution to lower congestion and reduce the volume of traffic using local roads to avoid the interchange. The longer term plan was to upgrade Reid Highway to a dual carriageway near the freeway interchange, including a second overpass bridge, and a second free-flowing loop ramp between Reid Highway westbound to the Mitchell Freeway northbound. The dual carriageway works commenced construction in May 2015 and were completed a year later.

In December 2012, the State Government announced the freeway would be extended between 2014–15 and 2016–17, over a distance of 6 kilometres (3.7 mi) to Hester Avenue in Clarkson. The extension included interchanges at Burns Beach Road and Neerabup Road. Work on the extension began with a ground-breaking ceremony on 20 May 2015. The projected cost was $261.4 million, with the federal government contributing $209.1 million and the state government funding the remaining $52.3 million. The project scope included a six-kilometre (3.7 mi) dual carriageway extension to Hester Avenue, with grade-separated interchanges at Burns Beach Road, Neerabup Road and Hester Avenue. Other roads in the area were upgraded, including widening Hester Avenue and Wanneroo Road, and extending Neerabup Road east to the intersection of Flynn Drive and Wanneroo Road. The project was completed on 3 August 2017, opened by Prime Minister Malcolm Turnbull, Premier Mark McGowan and Transport Minister Rita Saffioti.

In the late-2010s widening works were conducted, with the 7-kilometre-long (4.35 mi) southbound section of the freeway between Cedric and Vincent Streets widened to four lanes. $40 million was assigned to the freeway widening itself, with a further $19 million allocated for the upgrade and completion of a Principal Shared Path (PSP) between Scarborough Beach Road and Hutton Street, including a separated pedestrian and cyclist overpass over the former. The bridge for the overpass was notoriously delivered during peak hour on 11 September 2019, causing a 17-kilometre-long (11 mi) traffic jam for southbound commuters. The corresponding northbound section from Hutton to Cedric Street was also widened to four lanes, with the northbound exit lane onto the latter also widened to two lanes. 5.3 kilometres (3.3 mi) of concrete barriers were also installed between Glendalough Station and Erindale Road.

The latest extension, from Hester Avenue to Romeo Road in Alkimos was announced in 2019 and began construction in May 2021. Originally intended to be completed in 2022, delays brought upon by the COVID-19 pandemic pushed the $232 million extension's opening to 10 July 2023.

== Future works ==
=== Extensions ===
The Mitchell Freeway is planned to continue north to the Metropolitan Region Scheme's boundary, beyond Yanchep and Two Rocks.

=== Widening and upgrades ===
In May 2021 construction began on the implementation of a smart freeway system on the southbound carriageway between Hester Avenue and Vincent Street, which will see 16 on-ramps upgraded with coordinated ramp signals and the installation of 20 overhead electronic signs providing information to drivers. The works also includes the addition of a third lane to the southbound carriageway of the freeway from Hodges Drive to Hepburn Avenue. The upgrade was completed in December 2024.

=== Interchange upgrades ===
In November 2020 works began to extend Stephenson Avenue northbound from Scarborough Beach Road to Cedric Street, with the extension crossing over the freeway east of Stirling station, as part of the Stirling City Centre development project. The existing Cedric Street interchange will be mostly demolished save for its northbound on-ramp, with traffic redirected to use a new Stephenson Avenue interchange accordingly. The project is expected to be completed by the end of 2025.

== Interchanges ==
The entire freeway is in the Perth metropolitan region.

LGA	Location	km	mi	Destinations	Notes
Perth	Perth	0.0	0.0	Kwinana Freeway (State Route 2) south	Southern freeway terminus: continues as Kwinana Freeway
Perth	Perth	0.3– 0.8	0.19– 0.50	Mounts Bay Road (State Route 5) – Nedlands, Fremantle, Perth City Centre	Northbound exit to Hay Street via service road
Perth	Perth	0.8	0.50	William Street (State Route 5) – Perth City Centre	Partial Y-interchange: no northbound exit; Access to Perth Convention Centre
Perth	Perth, West Perth	1.3	0.81	Hay Street – West Perth	Northbound exit only
Perth	Perth, West Perth	1.4	0.87	Murray Street / Elder Street – no exit	Southbound entry only
Perth	Perth, West Perth	1.5	0.93	Wellington Street – Perth City Centre, West Perth	Northbound entry and southbound exit only
Perth, Vincent	West Perth	1.7	1.1	Market Street – West Perth	Northbound exit and southbound entry only
Perth, Vincent	West Perth	1.9	1.2	Roe Street – Northbridge	Southbound exit only
Perth, Vincent	West Perth	2.0	1.2	Charles Street (State Route 60) – North Perth, Yokine	Partial Y-interchange: northbound exit and southbound entry only
Perth, Vincent	West Perth	2.0– 2.6	1.2– 1.6	Graham Farmer Freeway (State Route 8) – East Perth, Burswood, Perth Airport	Full Y-interchange
Perth, Vincent	West Perth	2.3	1.4	Sutherland Street – no exit	Northbound entry only
Vincent, Cambridge	Leederville, West Leederville	3.5	2.2	Vincent Street / Lake Monger Drive (State Route 72) – Leederville, Wembley	Modified diamond interchange: southbound entry ramp looped, northbound exit ramp terminates at Southport Street; Provides access to/from Leederville Parade
Vincent, Cambridge, Stirling	Glendalough, Wembley	5.4	3.4	Powis Street – Glendalough, Mount Hawthorn	Northbound exit and southbound entry only
Stirling	Osborne Park, Stirling	7.7	4.8	Hutton Street – Osborne Park	Local roads have T-Junction intersections with the northbound exit southbound entry ramps
Stirling	Osborne Park, Stirling	9.3	5.8	Stephenson Avenue (State Route 64) – Herdsman, Shenton Park	Planned to replace Cedric Street as a diamond interchange.
Stirling	Innaloo, Stirling	9.6	6.0	Cedric Street (State Route 64) – Innaloo, Stirling	The entrance and exit ramps north of Cedric Street and south of Karrinyup Road merge, requiring traffic to weave
Stirling	Gwelup, Innaloo, Stirling	10.9	6.8	Karrinyup Road (State Route 76) – Karrinyup, Stirling	The entrance and exit ramps north of Cedric Street and south of Karrinyup Road merge, requiring traffic to weave
Stirling	Balcatta, Gwelup, Stirling	12.5	7.8	Erindale Road (State Route 77) – Balcatta, Gwelup	Northbound exit and southbound entry only
Stirling	Carine, Hamersley, Balcatta	13.8	8.6	Reid Highway (State Route 3) – North Beach, Midland, Perth Airport	Modified diamond interchange: southbound entry ramp looped along with Reid-west to Mitchell-North; Provides access to/from Balcatta Road
Joondalup	Duncraig, Greenwood, Warwick	15.9	9.9	Warwick Road (State Route 81) – Duncraig, Warwick	Weaving is required between Reid Highway and Warwick Road
Joondalup	Duncraig, Greenwood, Kingsley, Padbury	18.5	11.5	Hepburn Avenue (State Route 82) – Sorrento, Ballajura, Hillarys Boat Harbour, Whiteman Park	Access to Greenwood station via southbound entry ramp
Joondalup	Craigie, Kingsley, Padbury, Woodvale	20.6	12.8	Whitfords Avenue (State Route 83) – Hillarys, Wangara	Access to Whitfords station via southbound entry ramp
Joondalup	Craigie, Edgewater, Heathridge, Woodvale	23.2	14.4	Ocean Reef Road (State Route 84) – Edgewater, Ellenbrook, Ocean Reef	
Joondalup	Connolly, Heathridge, Joondalup	25.9	16.1	Hodges Drive – Joondalup, Ocean Reef	
Joondalup	Connolly, Currambine, Joondalup	27.7	17.2	Shenton Avenue – Currambine, Joondalup, Joondalup Health Campus	
Joondalup, Wanneroo	Currambine, Joondalup, Kinross, Neerabup	29.8	18.5	Burns Beach Road (State Route 87) – Burns Beach, Carramar, Bullsbrook	
Wanneroo	Clarkson, Neerabup	33.4	20.8	Neerabup Road – Neerabup, Clarkson	
Wanneroo	Clarkson, Neerabup, Nowergup, Ridgewood	35.9	22.3	Hester Avenue – Mindarie, Merriwa, Nowergup	
Wanneroo	Butler, Nowergup, Ridgewood	38.3	23.8	Lukin Drive – Merriwa, Quinns Rocks	Northbound entry ramp looped.
Wanneroo	Butler, Nowergup	40.5	25.2	Butler Boulevard – Butler, Jindalee	
Wanneroo	Alkimos, Carabooda, Nowergup	41.5	25.8	Romeo Road – Eglinton, Yanchep, Lancelin, Cervantes	Northern freeway terminus
Incomplete access; Unopened

== Criticism ==
British businessman and property developer Alistair McAlpine (1942–2014), who was active in Perth in the 1960s and remembers the site pre-motorway, was critical of the project (including the decision to demolish the old Pensioner Barracks - see: Barracks Arch), opining in his memoir:

They, the ubiquitous they, caused the peaceful bays of the Swan River to be filled with earth so they could build this motorway. The foreshore of the river's north bank became a spaghetti junction. (..) Now the great motorway, an act of conceit by a Government that saw the future of the State as grand, but not as grand as it became, runs through the city rather than around it, and the politicians' great vision, their desire to be modern, has become, 40 years later, a folly. The true beauty of the city, its peace, is shattered by traffic that another generation will try to eliminate by spending more taxpayers' money...

== See also ==
- Freeways in Australia
