= Hamersley, Western Australia =

Hamersley
- Suburb
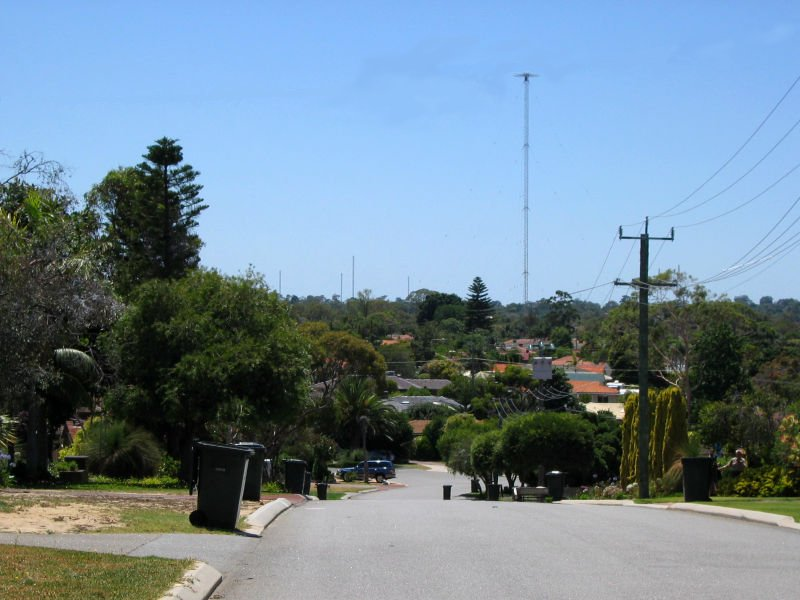
- View east from Benjafield Way towards ABC tower
- Interactive map of Hamersley
- Coordinates: 31.852°S 115.806°E
- Country: Australia
- State: Western Australia
- City: Perth
- LGA: City of Stirling
- Location: 14 km (8.7 mi) NNW of Perth CBD
- Established: 1968

Government
  - State electorate: Kingsley
  - Federal division: Cowan

Area
  - Total: 3.347 km^{2} (1.292 sq mi)

Population
  - Total: 5,209 (SAL 2021)
- Postcode: 6022
Suburbs around Hamersley
Duncraig	Warwick	Girrawheen
Carine	Hamersley	Balga
Gwelup	Balcatta	Westminster

Hamersley is a residential suburb 14 kilometres (8.7 miles) north-northwest of the Perth central business district in Western Australia, and six kilometres (4 mi) from the Indian Ocean. The suburb adjoins two major arterial roads—Mitchell Freeway to the west and Reid Highway to the south—and is within the City of Stirling local government area. It was built during the late 1960s and 1970s as part of the Government of Western Australia's response to rapidly increasing land prices across the metropolitan area.

Before development, Hamersley was a remote district covered in jarrah, marri, banksia and other vegetation typical of the Swan Coastal Plain, with small areas cleared for small-scale agriculture such as market gardening and poultry farming. By 1974, six years after the first subdivision, Hamersley was home to the district's first community hall, an annual parade and fair which were broadcast on Perth TV and radio, an active progress association, and its own newspaper, the Hamersley Gazette, a forerunner to today's Stirling Times. Rapid growth further north removed the focus from Hamersley, which was completed in 1981 and has remained relatively stable since then.

Significant reserves of remnant bushland remain in parts of the suburb. The largest of these is an exclusion zone around the 180-metre-high (590-foot) ABC radio tower in the suburb's southeast, which broadcasts AM stations to the Perth metropolitan area. The guyed tower was built in 1939 and is a landmark in the region, although it has been a local political issue since the 1980s.

== Geography ==
Map of Hamersley with roads, major streets and key features marked

Hamersley is in the northern suburbs of Perth, Western Australia, within the City of Stirling, and 6 kilometres (3.7 miles) from the Indian Ocean. Its borders are the Mitchell Freeway to the west, Reid Highway and the Balcatta industrial area to the south, Wanneroo Road to the east, and Beach Road and the City of Joondalup to the north. The suburb is divided into western and eastern portions by Erindale Road. Hamersley was one of the first Perth suburbs to be guided by the principles of cul-de-sac design.

Hamersley covers 3.347 square kilometres (827 acres) and averages 29 metres (95 feet) above sea level, although portions of the loop formed by Rannoch Circle in the eastern portion are 50–55 metres (164–180 ft) above sea level. A real estate magazine remarked in 1994 that "homes around the Rannoch circle enjoy some spectacular views to the city and the hills", and that "a few lucky householders... could even catch ocean glimpses, despite being more than six kilometres from the water."

The restricted-access bushland reserve surrounding the ABC radio tower in the suburb's southeast covers 14.4% (0.47 km^{2} or 120 acres) of its area, while parks and areas of natural bushland are spread throughout. The largest of these are Aintree-Eglinton Reserve, a 3.38-hectare (8.4-acre) grassed reserve next to the community centre complex, and Rannoch-Tay-Earn Reserve, a 4.83-hectare (11.9-acre) reserve containing large areas of native bushland interspersed with grassed and paved walkways. A biodiversity site north of the community centre is recognised by the City of Stirling's Green Plan 2.

Streets in western Hamersley are generally named after English towns, while eastern Hamersley uses the names of Scottish Highland and Perthshire towns and lochs. There are exceptions – the origins of Vickers Street precinct street names are unknown, while streets in the south-western corner are named after the "Bentley Boys", a group of British racing drivers from the 1920s and 1930s, and their car designer Walter Owen Bentley.

=== Natural history ===
Hamersley's soil is an infertile yellow-brown sand composed of fine to coarse quartz grains, with Tamala Limestone beneath. Locally known as Karrakatta Sand, it is almost certainly the leached remnants of coastal sand deposited by eolian processes in the late Pleistocene period, between 11,000 and 100,000 years ago. Below the sand are Paleozoic rocks of the Perth Basin. The sand contains an unconfined aquifer with large supplies of low-salinity potable groundwater which is recharged by rainfall.

As with other infertile areas of the Swan Coastal Plain, Hamersley would have supported open forests of Eucalyptus marginata (jarrah) with Corymbia calophylla (marri) or Eucalyptus gomphocephala (tuart), and an understorey of Banksia attenuata (candlestick banksia), B. menziesii (firewood banksia), B. grandis (bull banksia), Allocasuarina fraseriana (western sheoak) and Agonis flexuosa (Swan River peppermint). The main shrub species would have been Jacksonia sternbergiana (Stinkwood), J. furcellata (Grey Stinkwood), Acacia cyclops (Coastal Wattle), Acacia saligna (orange wattle), Hibbertia species, Allocasuarina humilis (dwarf sheoak), Calothamnus quadrifidus (one-sided bottlebrush) and Grevillea thelemanniana (spider net grevillea). Biodiversity surveys in 2006 have also identified a relatively rare species, Jacksonia sericea (waldjumi), in two eastern Hamersley reserves.

== History ==
=== Name ===
Hamersley was named after the Hamersley family who arrived in the colony of Western Australia in 1837 and established themselves at Guildford. There is no evidence they ever visited modern Hamersley, but in 1869 they built a summer home in what is now North Beach, 6 kilometres (3.7 miles) to the west, and bought considerable holdings in the area over the following years.

The name first came into use to describe the north-western section of the Perth Road District in 1906. Hamersley Ward was a large area of land covering what is now Hamersley, Carine, Watermans Bay, North Beach, Gwelup and parts of Balcatta, Karrinyup and Trigg. The Hamersley townsite, consisting of Hamersley Ward, was gazetted in 1945. As a result, many facilities in North Beach, including a primary school, a golf course, several sporting clubs and residents' and seniors' associations, were called Hamersley. After the Hamersley Development Scheme started in 1968, confusion as to exactly what Hamersley referred to led to conflict between established organisations in North Beach and emerging ones in Hamersley – the Hamersley Gazette noted in 1973 that "North Beach people have the prior claim but ours is more officially accepted".

The suburb was gazetted as a locality by the City of Stirling on 24 October 1975, although it had existed as a postal locality since 1971.

=== Early history ===
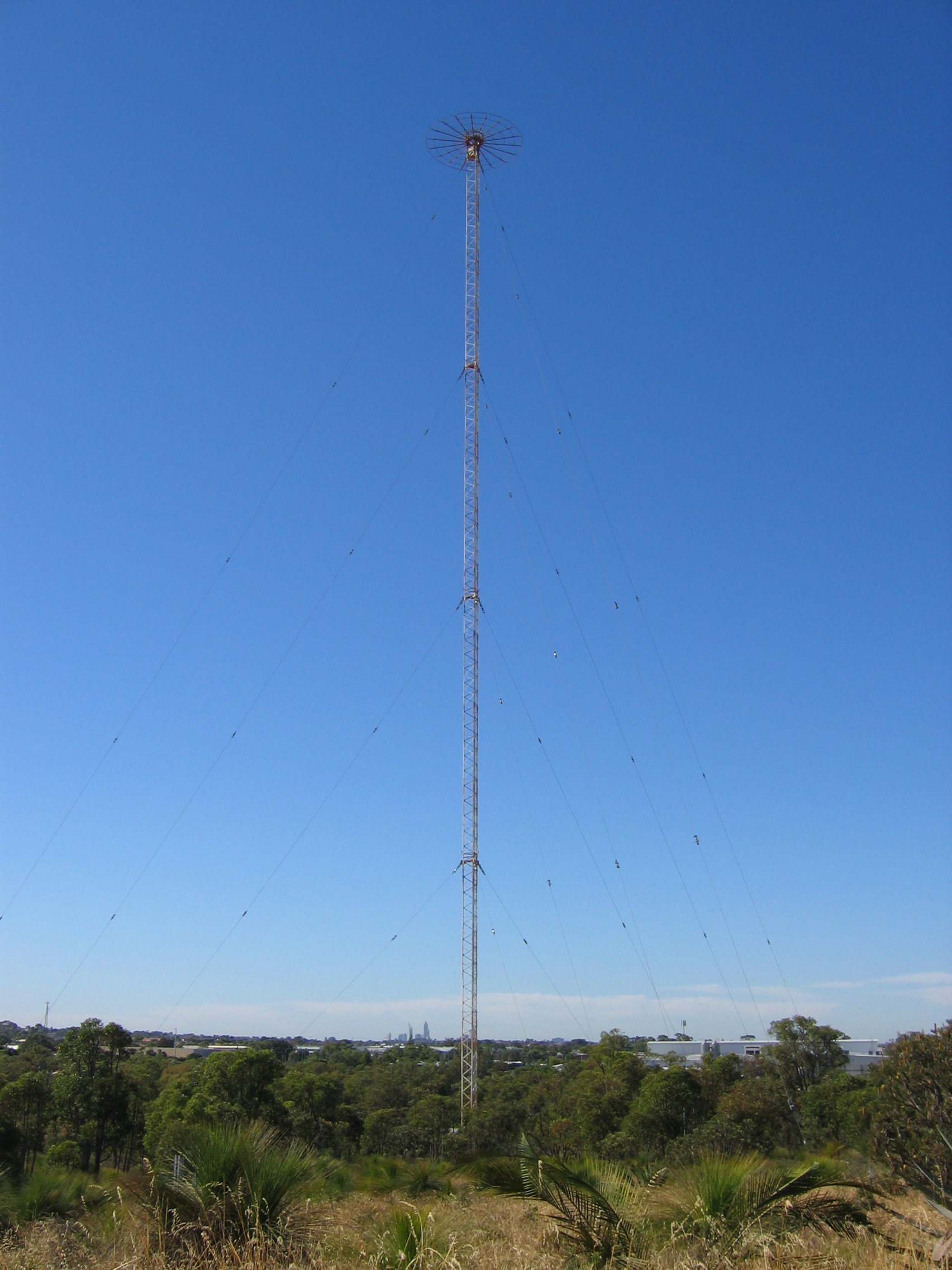
The ABC radio tower in Hamersley

Before European settlement, Hamersley was part of a larger area of land that was occupied by the Mooro people, an Indigenous Australian people who traversed the lakes and wetlands running parallel to the coast between what is now Perth and Yanchep.

Soon after the establishment of the Swan River Colony, colonial authorities divided up the land into grants which were given to settlers who had brought capital into the new settlement. Southern Hamersley became part of Location K, a 2,585-hectare (6,390-acre) strip of land extending 19 kilometres (12 miles) west from Caversham on the Swan River to Big Carine Swamp, which was granted to Robert Ansell Partridge in September 1829. The western part of this, first surveyed by P.L.S. Chauncy in 1843, remained fairly inaccessible, and the only development in the area was the construction of the Daviot Park cottage on Old Balcatta Road 500 metres (0.31 miles) southwest of Hamersley. By the late 1930s, portions in the far west and south-east of the suburb had been cleared for small-scale agriculture such as market gardening, and in 1939 the Department of the Interior constructed a 180-metre (590-foot) tower and other facilities for ABC AM and shortwave radio broadcasts on Wanneroo Road.

Northern Hamersley, meanwhile, became part of Swan Location 1315, which extended north to[Lake Goollelal and west to the coast and was granted in the 1890s to the Midland Railway of Western Australia after being surveyed by Crossland & Co. in 1892, and by N. Lymburner in 1894. It appears that no development occurred in northern Hamersley, other than the construction of Beach and Carine Roads in 1900, and the State Housing Commission resumed the land in November 1950. In 1962, a lucerne grower with a property on Duffy Road, Carine applied to use the northern half of the suburb as a sheep run. The Shire President, Herbert R. Robinson, refused to grant permission, saying that "land might soon be needed for housing". The West Australian reported in 1967 that the area was still "virtually untouched bushland".

=== Hamersley Development Scheme ===
Land use map of Hamersley in 1968

In the late 1960s, concern about the growth of land prices in the Perth metropolitan area, which for several years had exceeded the consumer price index, led to the premier of Western Australia, David Brand, convening an inter-departmental committee to study the problem. One of the committee's recommendations to Cabinet was to release 300 hectares (740 acres) of land owned by the State Housing Commission in Hamersley, Warwick and Greenwood which was on a much larger area that had been designated as "deferred urban" land under the Metropolitan Region Scheme in 1963. On 13 December 1967, the Metropolitan Region Planning Authority decided to rezone as urban all land bounded by Hepburn Avenue, Marmion Avenue, North Perimeter Highway and Wanneroo Road, on the condition that subdivision would be approved when "Town Planning (Development) Scheme(s) have been approved with the general object of serving the best possible development at the least cost to the community".

The shires of Perth and Wanneroo combined to prepare Town Planning Scheme No.26 (Hamersley Development Scheme), and by early March 1968, the scheme, which included provisions for water supply, sewerage, drainage, road construction and undergrounding of power mains, was presented to both councils for consideration. A time limit of 3 1/2 years for developers to construct homes on released land was built into the scheme in an effort to prevent land speculation, which the inter-departmental committee believed was a key factor in spiralling prices in Perth. By July, however, negotiations between the councils broke down, and the Shire of Perth (now City of Stirling) decided to administer its own part of the scheme independently. The scheme was divided into nine sections, with what is now the suburb of Hamersley being the first stage.

In April 1968 the R&I Bank, a government-owned bank, was granted permission to subdivide a small area in northern Ardleigh Crescent in the suburb's west. The first auction of 80 lots on Saturday, 14 December 1968 was anticipated on the front page of The West Australian, with Premier Brand advising intending buyers to be cautious about their bids. At the auction, 76 lots were sold at an average price of $4,784, compared to $6,700 at a recent R&I Bank sale in the nearby suburb of Karrinyup, with newspapers agreeing that the Premier's warning had been heeded by bidders.

The western portion of Hamersley grew steadily over the following months and years, with segments being released, auctioned and developed by the R&I Bank, T&S Plunkett Homes and Parkland Housing. The Hamersley Development Scheme, however, was doomed almost before it started. Disagreements over issues such as undergrounding of power and the time limit clauses between the Town Planning Board and the Shire of Perth had caused delays in the scheme's approval. In July 1970, the Shire Planner reported that "there is little point in proceeding with the Scheme, especially in view of the large areas already subdivided", and recommended the council agree "that for all practical purposes, Town Planning Scheme No. 26. is defunct". By the February 1971 state election, over 1,000 eligible voters lived in the district.

=== Suburban development ===
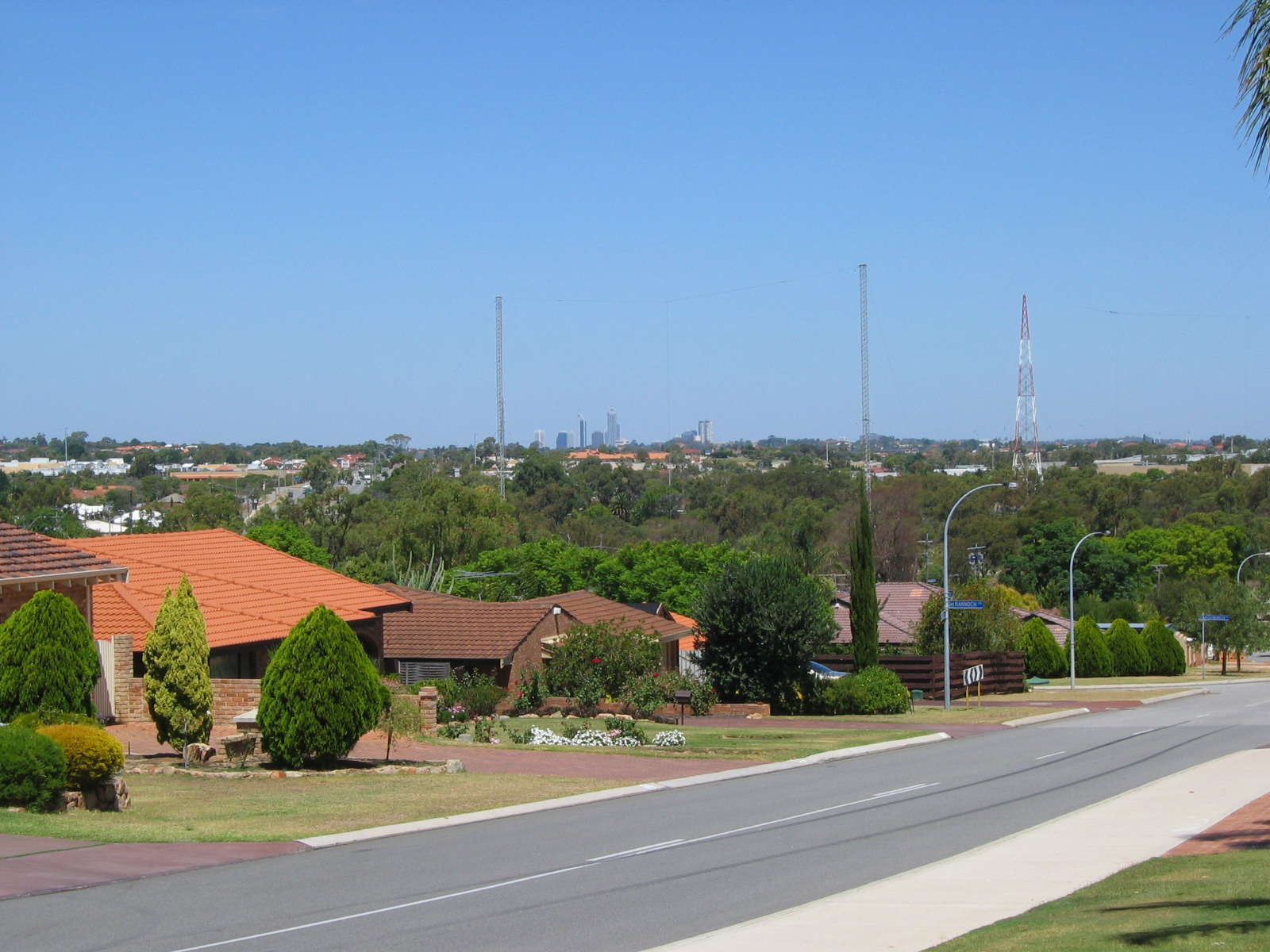
View southeast from Rannoch Circle towards the Perth CBD

In June 1970, the Metropolitan Region Planning Authority released land in the southwestern corner of Hamersley, which had previously been held in reserve under the Metropolitan Region Scheme for a large freeway interchange between the future Mitchell Freeway (then known as Stephenson Freeway) and Reid Highway (North Perimeter Freeway). The result of these changes was to allow the construction of Walter Way, Dutton Crescent and connecting streets, which were named after racing drivers from the 1920s and 1930s.

Between 1971 and 1973, reserves, public recreation areas and drainage sites were set aside in western Hamersley, and facilities were erected in quick succession – the 1st Hamersley Scout Group in 1973, the colonial-style Holy Cross Anglican Church in 1974, and a community hall at Aintree Street in 1975. Residents in the region were at this time on the fringe of Perth's suburban area, relying on partly built main roads, distant shopping centres and overstretched local facilities for several years after the suburb's construction. A locally produced fortnightly newspaper, the Hamersley Gazette, started in early 1973 by Peter Flanigan, from his home in Manton Court, covering the suburbs of Carine, Hamersley, Warwick and Greenwood, with the open aim of helping to form community associations and campaign for better facilities. A July 1973 article, for example, lamented that "work on Erindale Road appears to have come to a standstill... great piles of dirt and unmade road surfaces bear testimony to the fact that something is going on, or should be going on, but this one is taking a very long time."

However, there were also celebrations – the paper reported in detail on the annual Glendale Spring Fair, held between 1973 and 1976 by the Glendale P&C Association on the second Saturday in November. It included activities for children, marching bands provided by The Salvation Army and the Australian 10th Light Horse Regiment, and a parade along Glendale Avenue and Beach Road at 10:30 am. Intended originally as a fundraiser for the school, the Gazette reported that it was "a sort of glorified féte that rapidly outgrew its origins", with live coverage of the parade on ABC Rdaio Perth and on television station TVW-7 and personalities such as Jeff Newman in attendance. The fair, however, became the victim of a dispute over naming rights between the Glendale P&C, community groups and commercial sponsors. Other events included the grand opening of Warwick Grove Shopping Centre on 13 November 1974, the greening of Aintree-Eglinton Reserve and the activities of the Hamersley Progress Association. The paper was acquired in February 1977 by Bill Marwick of the Wanneroo Times, and evolved into the Stirling Times in 1980.

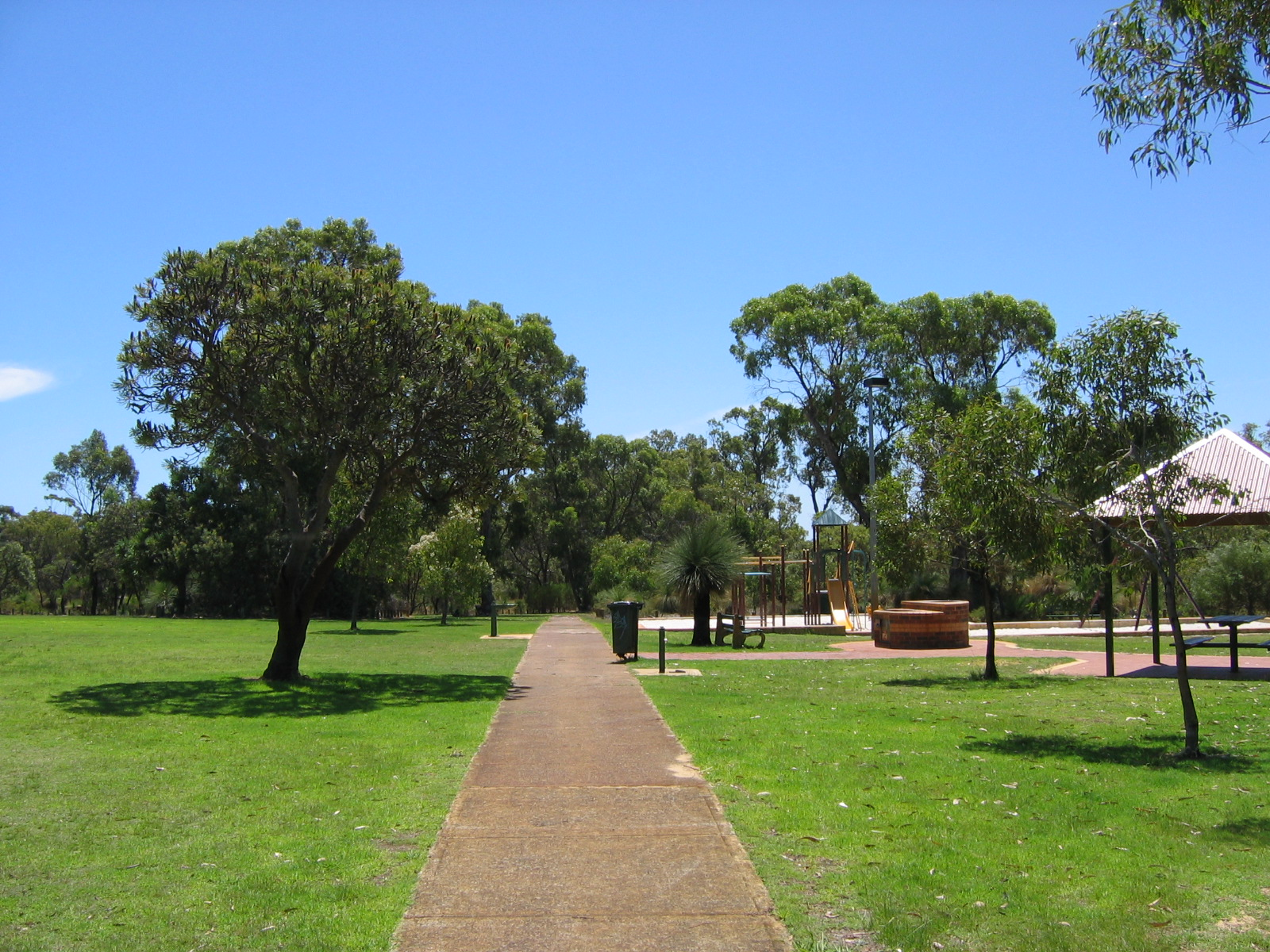
Rannoch-Tay-Earn Reserve, looking northwest along the former Carine Road

Meanwhile, work was only starting in eastern Hamersley. In 1973 Project Homes acquired a poultry farm and agricultural holding, and completed the construction of Vickers Street and adjoining roads, with Don Place becoming a display village. In 1974 the City of Stirling agreed, after complex negotiations, to sell 4.2 hectares (10 acres) of land comprising Carine Road and Allen Street to the State Housing Commission and to the War Service Homes Commission in order to "facilitate a satisfactory subdivisional design of adjoining land held by the State Housing Commission" in the eastern portion of the suburb. All that remains of these two early roads are paved pathways within the Rannoch-Tay-Earn Reserve, which was gazetted in 1976. By July 1975, 200 defence service homes were under construction on land immediately to the east of Erindale Road, to be made available to veterans from March 1976. The rest of eastern Hamersley was built over the next few years, and by 1981 development was essentially complete. The community hall was redeveloped into a full-fledged community centre, which officially opened in 1990.

Despite Hamersley's stability in the years since 1981 and its relatively low crime rate, it has periodically drawn the attention of the Perth media. In July 2000, a man bludgeoned his former girlfriend, mother-of-two Deborah Boyd, to death in a rented home in Brabant Way. He was subsequently sentenced to strict-security life imprisonment. On 23 January 2006, a large scrub fire caused the closure of Reid Highway and delays in rail line services during the afternoon rush hour.

== Demographics ==
Hamersley had a population of 5,209 at the 2021 census. This was an increase on the 4,982 recorded at the 2016 and 2011 censuses, and the 4,965 recorded at the 2006 census, but a decrease on the 5,233 recorded at the 2001 census. At the 2021 census, 49.8% of residents were male and 50.2% were female. The median age was 39, above the state and national average of 38. 1.1% of residents identified as Aboriginal and/or Torres Strait Islander, below the state and national averages of 3.3% and 3.2% respectively.

At the 2021 census, Hamersley had a median weekly personal income of $892. The median weekly family income was $2,227 and the median weekly household income was $1,856. These were all close to the state average. The most common occupations were professionals (27.4%), technicians and trades workers (17.6%), clerical and administrative workers (13.2%), managers (11.0%), community and personal service workers (10.8%), labourers (7.1%), sales workers (7.0%), and machinery operators and drivers (4.6%). Major industries that residents worked in included hospitals (except psychiatric hospitals) (5.3%), primary education (3.3%), secondary education (2.4%), supermarket and grocery stores (2.2%), and state government administration (2.1%).

Out of Hamersley's 1,981 dwellings, 94.6% were occupied and 5.2% were unoccupied as of the 2021 census. Out of the 1,981 occupied dwellings, 90.5% were detached houses, 9.1% were semi-detached, and 0.3% were considered flats or apartments. 48.9% of the occupied dwellings had four or more bedrooms and the average number of bedrooms was 3.5%, slightly above the state average of 3.3%. The average number of people per household was 2.6%, close to the state and national average of 2.5%. 39.9% of occupied dwellings were owned outright, higher than the state average of 29.2%; 42.7% were owned with a mortgage, close to the state average of 40.0%; and 16.0% were rented, below the state average of 27.3%.

At the 2021 census, 76.7% of Hamersley households were families, above the state average of 71.2%; 21.7% were single-person households, below the state average of 25.4%; and 1.6% were group households, below the state average of 3.4%. Of those family households, 39.8% were couples without children, 43.9% were couples with children, 15.3% were single parents with children, and 1.2% were some other type of family. These figures are all close to the state averages of 38.8%, 44.6%, 15.1% and 1.6% respectively.

The most common ancestries that Hamersley residents identified with at the 2021 census were English (40.0%), Australian (34.9%), Irish (11.9%), Scottish (9.1%), and Italian (7.2%). 69.0% of residents were born in Australia. The next most common birthplaces were England (6.8%), New Zealand (3.2%), Ireland (1.5%), India (1.3%), and South Africa (1.2%). 42.1% of residents had both parents born in Australia and 37.8% had both parents born overseas. The most common religious affiliations were no religion (43.6%), Catholic (22.2%), Anglican (10.6%), not stated (3.6%), and Christian, nfd (3.0%). Holy Cross Hamersley is located on Glendale Ave, and is an Anglican church in the evangelical tradition. All Saints Catholic Church is in neighbouring Warwick and the local Uniting Churches are in Carine and Greenwood.

== Amenities and facilities ==
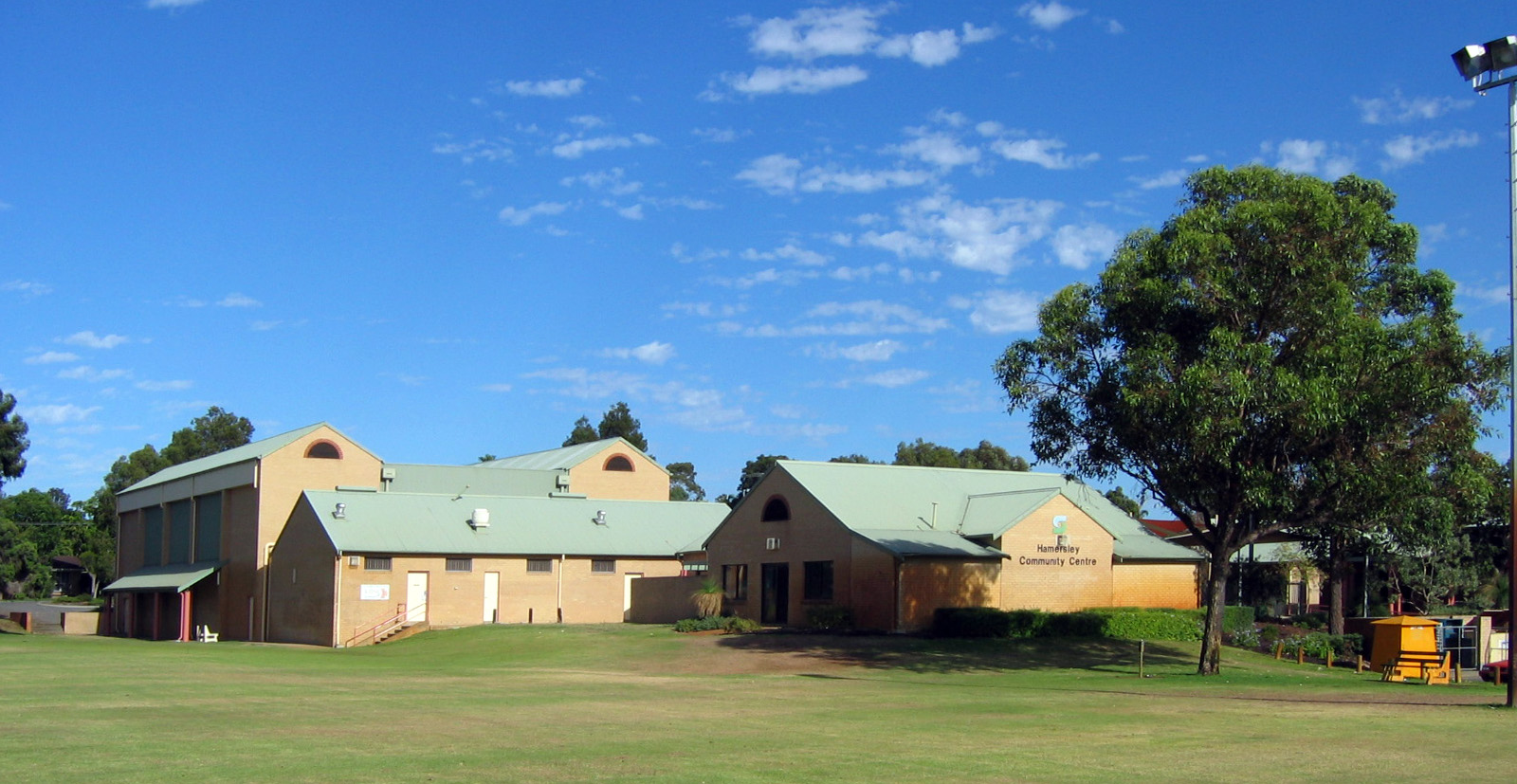
Hamersley community centre, with sports hall (left) and centre (right)

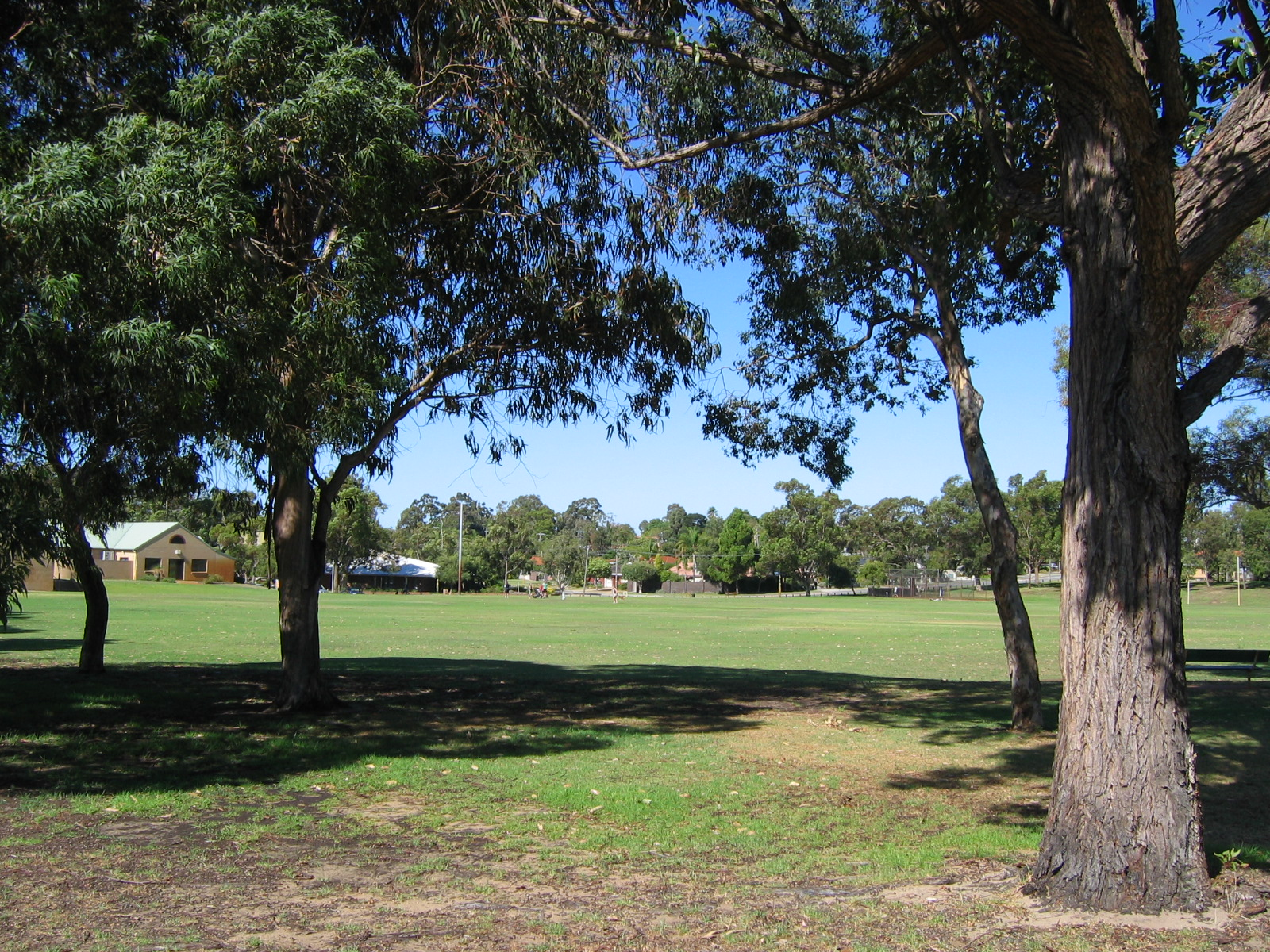
Aintree-Eglinton Reserve in western Hamersley

Hamersley is a residential suburb, relying on the Warwick Grove shopping centre on its northern boundary for commercial services, and is 7 kilometres (4.3 miles) by road from Karrinyup Shopping Centre. A light industrial area is to the south in Balcatta which includes a large Bunnings on Erindale Road approximately 200 metres (660 ft) south of Hamersley.

Aintree-Eglinton Reserve, a grassed area covering 3.38 hectares (8.4 acres), contains a cricket pitch, several practice runs and night lights for Australian rules football, which are utilised by local amateur and junior clubs. Within the reserve is the Hamersley Community Recreation Centre, first built in the 1970s as a community hall and opened in its present form on 22 April 1990. The centre is a small village area consisting of a central pergola crossed with walking paths, flanked by four buildings: a sports hall with basketball courts and kiosk, an arts and crafts building, a community hall and function building hosting discos and other social events, and a purpose-built children's centre. Near the centre are the 1st Hamersley Scout Group, a child health centre and the Holy Cross Anglican Church, a colonial-style building built in 1974 and consecrated on 14 December 1980 to serve the newly formed Balcatta-Hamersley Parish.

Numerous small parks are throughout all parts of Hamersley, usually joining the ends of several cul-de-sacs.

The southeastern corner contains the ABC 50 kW radio tower which transmits ABC AM radio in Perth, including ABC Local Radio (6WF), Radio National and ABC NewsRadio. Several other towers, including a 20 kW and 10 kW tower, are also at the site. Some residents argue that electromagnetic interference from the towers is adversely affecting their television and telephone reception, with the issue taken up in Federal parliament by local MPs. An inquiry was held by ACMA in November 2010 into the situation, which found that apart from some disturbance to ABC2 signals, TV and radio signals in the area were of acceptable strength and quality.

== Education ==
Hamersley contains two state primary schools, each of which includes facilities for pre-primary students, and a teaching resource centre. Hamersley is within the catchment area for Warwick Senior High School for students from Years 8 to 12.

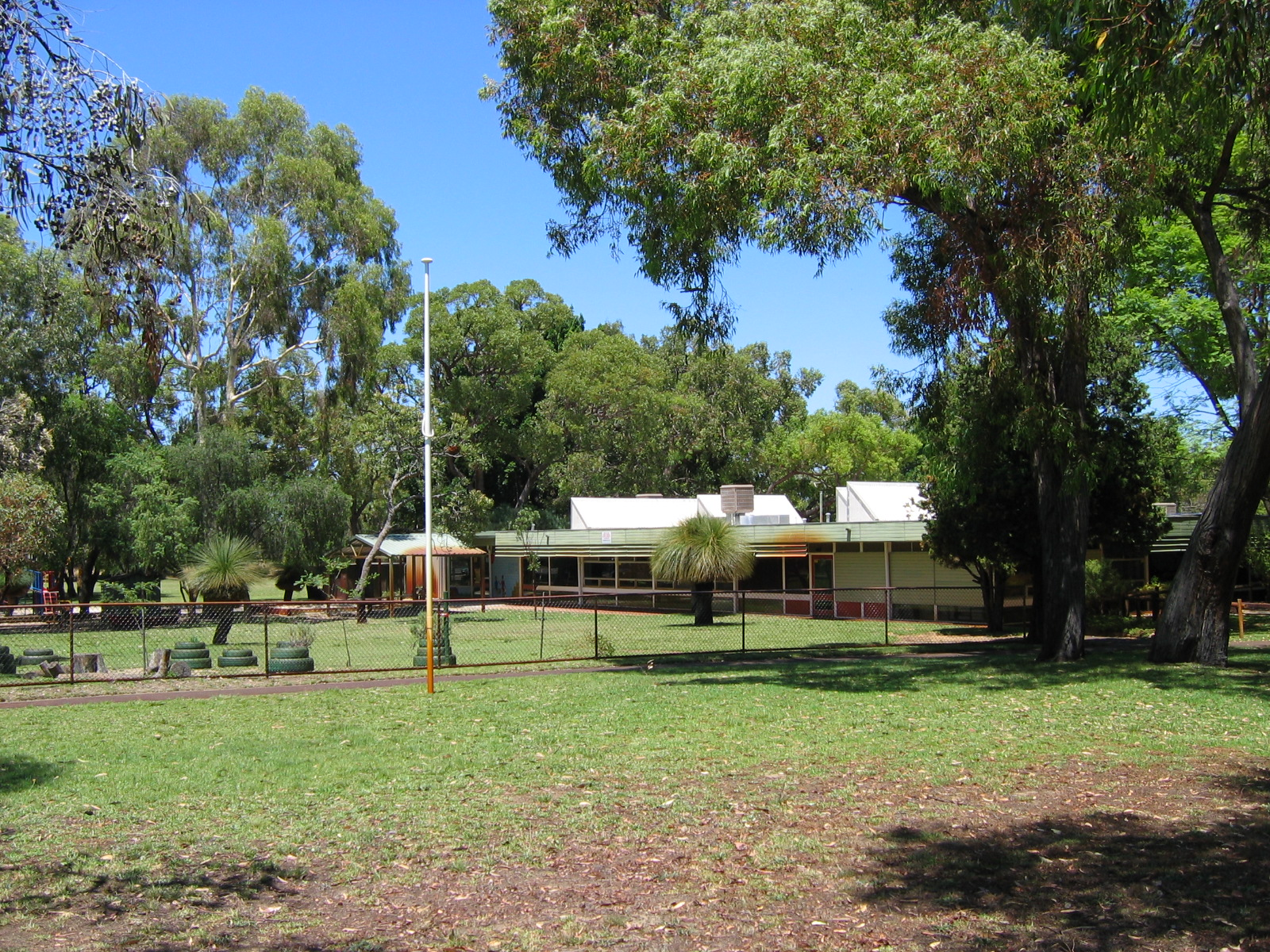
Glendale Primary School, fronted by Xanthorrhoea trees

Hamersley's first school, Glendale Primary School in Glendale Avenue, opened in 1971 in the western portion of the suburb. The school and neighbouring kindergarten quickly became overcrowded as their catchment area initially extended to Hepburn Avenue, taking in Warwick and Greenwood to its north. As schools were built in those suburbs in 1974–1976, congestion eased considerably. The school and kindergarten were also used as a hall and meeting place by residents and groups until the recreation centre opened in April 1975. In 2016, the school provided for 248 primary students between Year 1 and Year 6, and 28 pre-primary students.

From 1976 onward, the eastern portion of the suburb was developed, and East Hamersley Primary School, in Doon Way, opened in February 1979. In 2006, the school provided for 109 primary, 30 pre-primary and 29 kindergarten students. Computer studies and Indonesian language are required subjects for students from Years 3 to 6. In the 1990s, the West Coast Resource Centre, a specialist borrowing library for teachers of kindergarten, pre-primary and primary classes, was built on the East Hamersley site by the Department of Education (now Education and Training) to serve schools in the northern suburbs.

== Transport ==
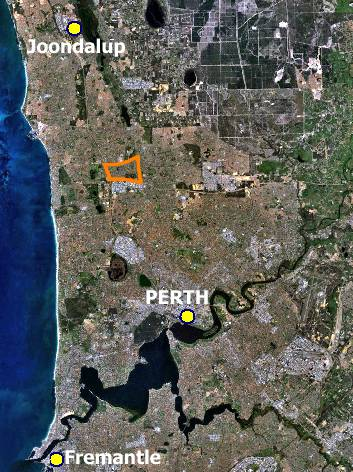
Location of Hamersley (orange) within the northern suburbs of Perth

Cars are the most common mode of transport for Hamersley residents. At the 2021 census, 69.6% of employed residents used a car to get to work, either as the driver or passenger. This figure is close to the state average of 68.8%. 8.0% of employed residents took public transport to work, slightly above the state average of 7.4%.

Hamersley is bounded by four arterial roads. To the south is Reid Highway, a controlled access highway which connects the suburb to North Beach (7 km), Scarborough (10 km) and Perth Airport (22 km). To the west is the Mitchell Freeway, which can be accessed via an interchange with Reid Highway. The freeway leads to the Perth CBD to the south (15 km) and Joondalup to the north (17 km). To the north is Beach Road, from which the Warwick Grove shopping centre can be accessed. Beach Road runs east to west across Perth and does not have an interchange with the Mitchell Freeway. To the east is Wanneroo Road, which also leads to the Perth CBD. Bisecting Hamersley is Erindale Road, which leads to the Balcatta industrial area and Karrinyup Shopping Centre (7 km). Due to the controlled-access nature of Reid Highway and the Mitchell Freeway, there are only a few roads leaving Hamersley to the south and west. Erindale Road and Wanneroo Road are the only roads to cross over Reid Highway, and Beach Road and Reid Highway are the only roads to cross the Mitchell Freeway, although there is also a footbridge.

=== Public transport ===
{{cnspaPublic transport in Hamersley is generally in the form of Transperth buses operated by Swan Transit from the Warwick railway station at its northwestern corner, linking via the Yanchep line to the Perth CBD.}}

At the 2011 census, the Australian Bureau of Statistics reported that 13.9% of Hamersley's residents used public transport to get to work. This was a sizable jump from 8.5% in the 2006 census, and was higher than the north-western metropolitan average of 13.1%. Public transport usage was highest (16.8%) in the section of Hamersley closest to the train station, and lowest (8.3%) in the Vickers Street section to the southeast, where many residents live more than 10 minutes' walk from the nearest bus stop.

Currently, the only service in the suburb is the 387 daytime service between Warwick and Perth via Balcatta Road, which travels along Eglinton Crescent. Eastern Hamersley does not have a direct service, other than those along Erindale and Wanneroo Roads. However, service along Wanneroo Road is very limited outside standard weekday hours.

Originally, Hamersley was served by a shuttle service to Wanneroo Road, Nollamara, to connect with other routes to the Perth CBD. In September 1973, the Metropolitan Transport Trust introduced the 358 and 359 services, which linked Greenwood to Perth via Eglinton Crescent and Glendale Avenue/Aintree Street respectively, travelling along Blissett Way, then becoming limited-stops Wanneroo Road services. An after-hours service, the 369, was also introduced. In 1987, following the construction of the Warwick Transfer Station and the Mitchell Freeway, services along Glendale Avenue and through East Hamersley ceased, with two new routes – the 347 and the Freeway-bound 387 – being created to serve Eglinton Crescent.

On 21 March 1993, the Joondalup line (now known as the Yanchep line) came into operation as part of the Northern Suburbs Transit System, resulting in the creation of the 449 and 457 services to replace the 387 service. The 449 operated only during the morning and evening rush-hour, while the 457 operated after-hours and at weekends. These services operated virtually unchanged until 6 November 2011, when the 347 was replaced with the present-day 387, and the 457 and weekday evening services were withdrawn. On 31 January 2016, the 449 was also withdrawn, leaving Hamersley without weekend bus services.

==== Bus ====
- 371 Warwick Station to Galleria Bus Station – serves Beach Road and Wanneroo Road
- 387 Warwick Station to Perth Busport – serves Beach Road, Belvedere Road and Eglinton Crescent
- 388 Warwick Station to Perth Busport – serves Beach Road and Wanneroo Road
- 389 Wanneroo to Perth Busport – serves Wanneroo Road
- 427 and 428 Warwick Station to Stirling Station – serve Beach Road and Erindale Road

Bus routes serving Beach Road:

- 344 Warwick Station to Galleria Bus Station
- 445, 446 and 447 Warwick Station to Whitfords Station
- 448 Warwick Station to Kingsway City
- 449 Warwick Station to Malaga
- 450 Warwick Station to Landsdale

== Politics ==
Liberal (blue) vs ALP (red) two-party-preferred results at federal level, 1984–2004, and state level, 1977–2005

Hamersley has consistently favoured the centre-right Liberal Party at both federal and state elections throughout its history. However, in the 2001 and 2005 state elections and at the 1983 federal election, Hamersley booths recorded a majority for the centre-left Australian Labor Party (ALP). Hamersley has also shown a higher preference than the regional average for progressive minor parties such as the Australian Greens and Australian Democrats. Hamersley is both socially and geographically between the safe Liberal suburbs west of the Mitchell Freeway such as Carine, Duncraig and North Beach, and the safe Labor suburbs east of Wanneroo Road such as Balga and Girrawheen.

At federal level, Hamersley is within the Division of Stirling, a marginal seat which historically has alternated between the Liberal Party and the Australian Labor Party. It has been held since 2004 by Michael Keenan of the Liberal Party. At polling place and subdivision level, Hamersley has supported the Liberal Party at every election since its first in 1972, the only exception being the 1983 election. In the 2001 election, the booth at East Hamersley Primary School was only won by the Liberal Party with a 0.3% two-party-preferred majority. Hamersley was in the Division of Cowan for elections held between 1984 and 1996.

In the Western Australian Legislative Assembly, Hamersley is split between the electorates of Girrawheen and Balcatta, ordinarily both safe seats for the Australian Labor Party. At polling place level, Hamersley supported the Liberal Party at every election since its first in 1971 until the 1996 election. In both the 2001 and 2005 elections, polling places in Hamersley, as with those in many northern Perth suburbs, switched to the Australian Labor Party at state level. However, at the 2008 and 2013 elections, the suburb returned a majority for the Liberals.

At local level, Hamersley is represented within the City of Stirling by the two councillors of the Hamersley Ward, which covers the suburbs of Carine, Hamersley, Gwelup and northern Balcatta. At present, Samantha Jenkinson, whose term expires in October 2019, and Andrew Guilfoyle, whose term expires in October 2017, represent Hamersley Ward.

In the early 1970s, the Hamersley Progress Association was formed to represent the views of Hamersley residents to all levels of government. It was, however, fairly short-lived. In 1999, the Hamersley Reference Group was formed to advise then-Federal Member for Stirling Jann McFarlane MHR on issues related to the ABC radio transmission towers and their effect on local residents. It was renamed to Radio Interference Group – Hamersley Towers after it moved to complete community management, and lobbies the government and makes submissions to public inquiries on behalf of the community on the issue.

Polling place statistics are presented below combining the votes from the Glendale and East Hamersley polling places in the federal and state elections as indicated.

Federal results
Election	First		Second		Third		Fourth		Fifth	
2022	Labor	37.3	Liberal	35.7	Greens	13.7	One Nation	3.5	Western Australia	2.5
2019	Liberal	48.0	Labor	29.9	Greens	13.5	One Nation	3.5	United Australia	2.1
2016	Liberal	50.3	Labor	30.8	Greens	11.7	Independent	2.8	Christians	2.7
2013	Liberal	52.1	Labor	25.8	Greens	12.2	Palmer United	5.2	Christians	2.0
2010	Liberal	50.4	Labor	30.8	Greens	13.7	Christian Democrats	2.4	Independent	1.8
2007	Liberal	48.6	Labor	42.7	Greens	7.2	Christian Democrats	2.6	What Women Want	0.9
2004	Liberal	50.2	Labor	36.0	Greens	7.2	Christian Democrats	2.8	One Nation	1.4
2001	Liberal	43.4	Labor	37.0	Democrats	6.2	Greens	5.6	One Nation	4.7
1998	Liberal	45.7	Labor	35.4	One Nation	7.4	Democrats	5.6	Greens	4.1

State results
Election	First		Second		Third		Fourth		Fifth	
2021	Labor	52.7	Liberal	33.9	Greens	9.2	One Nation	2.0	No Mandatory Vaccination	1.5
2017	Labor	42.4	Liberal	39.0	Greens	11.7	Christians	3.1	Micro Business	2.4
2013	Liberal	49.1	Labor	38.0	Greens	9.2	Christians	2.3	Family First	1.3
2008	Liberal	46.2	Labor	36.2	Greens	16.1				
2005	Labor	46.1	Liberal	38.3	Greens	9.2	Christian Democrats	6.5		
2001	Labor	42.3	Liberal	37.3	One Nation	8.5	Greens	8.2	Democrats	5.5
1996	Liberal	47.9	Labor	36.0	Democrats	16.1				
