= Gwelup, Western Australia =

Gwelup Perth, Western Australia
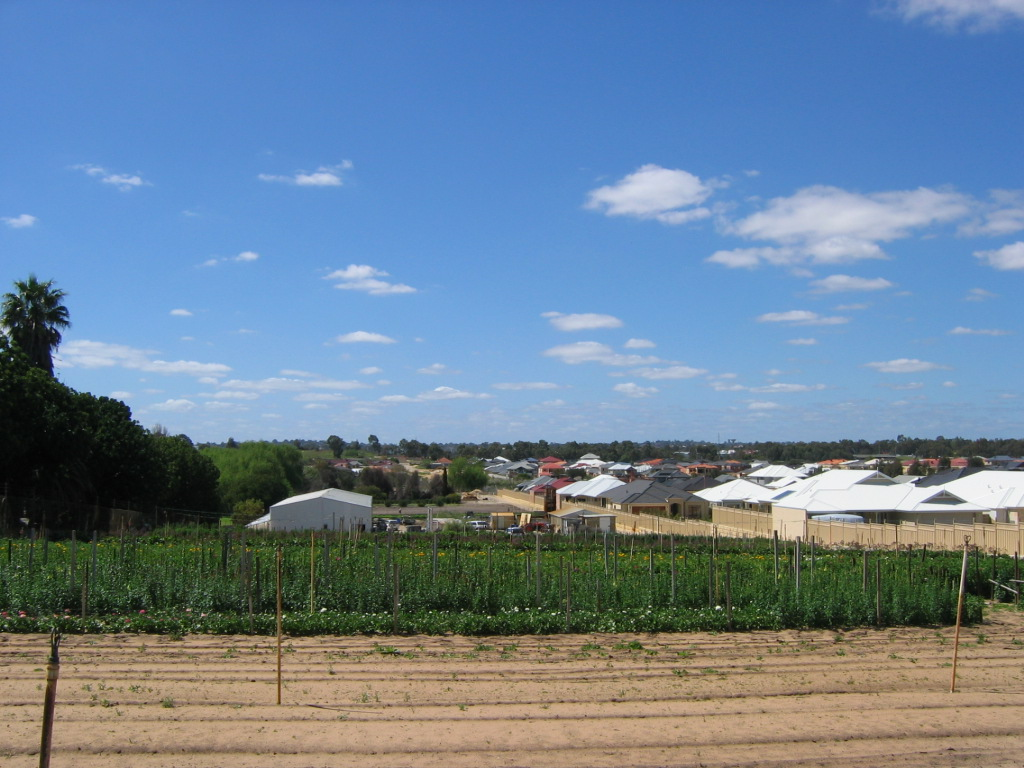
- A market garden on North Beach Road, surrounded by residential development
- Coordinates: 31.8762°S 115.7989°E
- Population: 5,391 (SAL 2021)
- Established: 1970s
- Postcode(s): 6018
- Area: 2.9 km^{2} (1.1 sq mi)
- Location: 12 km (7 mi) from Perth CBD
- LGA(s): City of Stirling
- State electorate(s): Carine, Scarborough
- Federal division(s): Curtin; Moore
Suburbs around Gwelup:
| Carine | Carine | Hamersley |
| Karrinyup | Gwelup | Balcatta |
| Doubleview | Innaloo | Stirling |

Gwelup is a suburb of Perth, the capital city of Western Australia 12 km north of Perth's central business district (CBD) along the Mitchell Freeway. Its local government area is the City of Stirling.

== History and environment ==
The name "Gwelup" refers to a small swamp located within the southern portion of the suburb. It was derived from the Noongar word "Gwelgannow" meaning "to shift position". Hence, Lake Gwelup was referred to as "the lake that shifts position". The name first appears in Lands Department records in 1878 as "Gwelup Swamp".

Situated on the western side of the suburb of Gwelup, lies the remainder of the once broader Lake Gwelup and accompanying bushland nature reserve. As one of the few wetlands that has a mostly intact native bushland, Lake Gwelup is home to a wide variety of local and visitor birds (waders, raptors, ducks etc.) as well many frogs (notably Moaning Frogs Heleioporus eyrei), reptile species (e.g. dugites, skinks and long necked turtles). Native flora in the bushland include Marri (Corymbia calophylla), Jarrah (Eucalyptus marginata), Flooded Gum (E. rudis), Tuart (E. gomphocephela) as well as at least four species of Banksia, many annual wildflowers (incl. orchids) and fungi. One of the most spectacular species of visiting birds is the Rainbow Bee-eater (Merops ornatus).

Throughout the wetland regions, Aboriginal people hunted for kangaroo, emu, snakes, tortoise, mudfish, gilgies and water birds and their eggs, to name a few food sources. Aboriginal sites are known to have existed in a few locations in the Gwelup-Balcatta region.

Land near Lake Gwelup was first granted to Thomas Mews in 1831. It passed through several owners before being acquired by Henry Bull of Sydney in 1891. Gwelup was subdivided by Henry Bull during 1898 and 1899; however, development was relatively slow and the land was used mainly for market gardens in the early years. In the 1960s, the area which presently accommodates The Willows Estate also offered a 6 hectare peat deposit which was mined for local agriculture. From the 1970s, Gwelup transformed from a rural area to a modern residential suburb. Only a few market gardens along North Beach Road remain as a reminder of earlier times. The Mitchell Freeway's extension to Erindale Road in 1984 and to Ocean Reef Road in 1986-87 facilitated the area's development.

The triangle bounded by Lake Gwelup, Porter Street and North Beach Road is the oldest residential section, having been opened up by the Metropolitan Region Planning Authority in 1967 for urban development - other parts were built and settled in the late 1990s when the swamps were drained. Controversy has arisen as to the effect of both the draining and of some building practices on the groundwater in the catchment region.

== Geography and hydrography ==
Gwelup is bounded by Lake Gwelup, the Mitchell Freeway to the east, Old Balcatta Road to the north (Reid Highway, accessible via Duffy Road, is located just a few hundred metres further north) and Karrinyup Road to the south. Due to Gwelup's swampy nature and the Lake Gwelup Reserve, considerable tracts of land remain undeveloped. Peaty soils around the lake region that have been reclaimed, now feature the highest concentrations of dissolved arsenic in the world - some 25000 ug/L (some 400 times higher than that identified as safe levels for drinking water). It is well known among scientific communities that disturbance of acid sulphate soils causes the release of As, iron sulfides and other chemicals. In the previous 32 years prior to 2000, the lake was recorded to dry out twice, since that year the lake barely remained wet once over the summer in 2005/2006. The lowered water tables can be blamed on reduced rainfall and over consumption of regional scheme waters.

At the 2006 Australian census, Gwelup had a mostly white middle-income population of 3,239 people living in 1,102 dwellings. The type and style of residential dwellings contained within Gwelup varies considerably, ranging from early market garden cottages to recently designed two-storey developments. New subdivisions, including Karrinyup Waters, Settlers Green and The Willows, contain modern architecturally designed homes. Along North Beach Road, there are remnants of older, rural-style housing. These character homes are gradually being renovated or replaced by new developments.

== Facilities ==
Gwelup is a residential suburb, with the Gwelup Plaza neighbourhood shopping centre which meets daily shopping needs. Nearby Karrinyup Shopping Centre provides other services. The suburb contains Lake Gwelup Primary School, originally opened in 1914 in two wooden school buildings which are now heritage-listed, and currently new buildings being built, Gwelup falls within Carine Senior High School's catchment area.

Gwelup has significant areas of public open space scattered throughout the residential area, offering meeting places and recreational opportunities for the local and wider community. Lake Gwelup, a 75-hectare (185-acre) reserve vested in the City of Stirling and centred on the 25 hectare Lake Gwelup Wetland, preserves a significant part of the natural environment, while allowing passive recreation. There are also tennis courts and cycle paths located on the Lake Gwelup Reserve.

Careniup Swamp, the wetland which gave its name to nearby Karrinyup, was formerly bounded by Gribble Road, Balcatta Road, North Beach Road and the freeway. Much of it was drained for housing in the mid-1990s, but the northwestern section of it has been preserved as a wetland and recreation area.

A volunteer conservation group (The Friends of Lake Gwelup est. 1994) work closely with the local government and local residents on local environmental matter, develop a species list for flora, fauna and fungi in the area and produce a quarterly newsletter.

== Transport ==
Gwelup's northern and southern sections respectively are served by Transperth 424 and 427 bus routes from Stirling railway station, which is a nine-minute commute to Perth's central business district. The 424 service links the suburb with Karrinyup Shopping Centre. All bus services are operated by Swan Transit.

In 1925, the North Beach Bus Company was started by Alf Lehman with crimson charabancs. It was taken over by the James family in 1928, in an era when REO buses drove over plank roads through the wetlands between modern-day Tuart Hill and North Beach. The company was taken over by the Metropolitan Transport Trust on 30 September 1961.

As part of the planning process for the Northern Suburbs Transit System, planners left themselves with a number of options for future stations along the line. One of these options included a location along the railway line near Wishart Street in the Mitchell Freeway reserve. This still remains as a long-term option for the line.

== Politics ==
Gwelup is a reasonably affluent suburb with many "mortgage belt" families and socially liberal voters. It consistently supports the Liberal Party at both federal and state elections.

2007 federal election Source: AEC
| Liberal | 58.78% |
| Labor | 30.42% |
| Greens | 7.48% |
| CDP | 1.56% |

2004 federal election Source: AEC
| Liberal | 58.7% |
| Labor | 29.8% |
| Greens | 6.11% |
| CDP | 2.16% |
| Democrats | 1.17% |

2001 federal election Source: AEC
| Liberal | 50.5% |
| Labor | 31.9% |
| Greens | 6.82% |
| Democrats | 4.80% |
| One Nation | 3.36% |

2005 state election Source: WAEC
| Liberal | 50.4% |
| Labor | 34.8% |
| Greens | 10.2% |
| CDP | 4.52% |

2001 state election Source: WAEC
| Liberal | 38.8% |
| Labor | 37.2% |
| Greens | 8.73% |
| Democrats | 5.57% |
| Independent | 5.24% |
