= Balcatta =

- Suburb
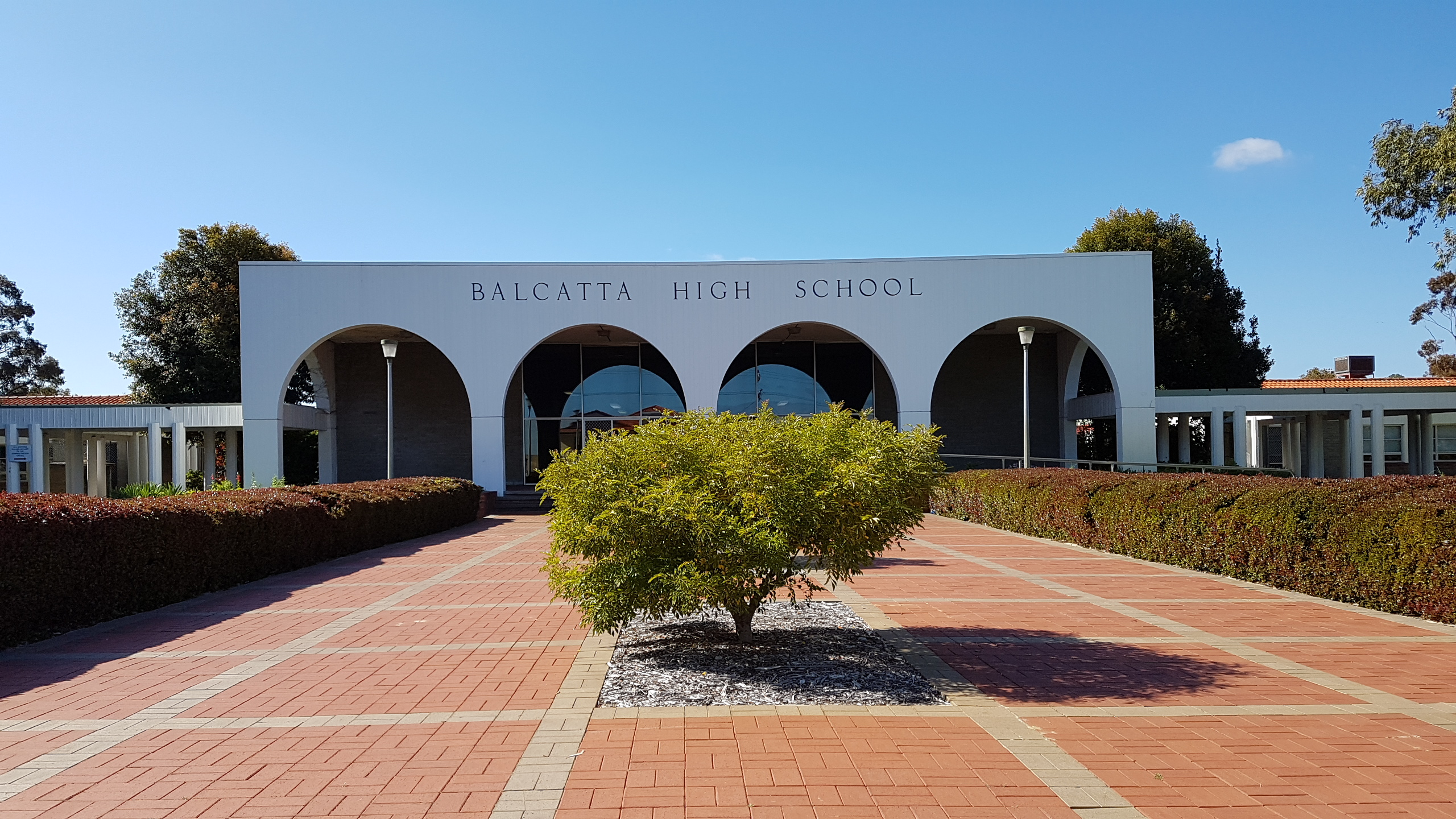
- Southern entrance of Balcatta Senior High School
- Interactive map of Balcatta
- Coordinates: 31.876°S 115.817°E
- Country: Australia
- State: Western Australia
- City: Perth
- LGA: City of Stirling
- Location: 10 km (6.2 mi) NNW of Perth CBD

Government
  - State electorate: Balcatta
  - Federal division: Cowan

Area
  - Total: 7.3 km^{2} (2.8 sq mi)

Population
  - Total: 10,813 (SAL 2021)
- Postcode: 6021
Suburbs around Balcatta
Carine	Hamersley	Balga
Gwelup	Balcatta	Westminster and Nollamara
Stirling	Osborne Park and Tuart Hill	Yokine

Balcatta is a suburb of Perth, Western Australia. Its local government area is the City of Stirling. It is a primarily middle-class suburb made up of mainly Italian and Greek families as well as many families from other European countries. It is also one of the largest suburbs in the northern part of the Perth metropolitan area. Much of Balcatta is a commercial and industrial area.

== History ==
Balcatta's name was derived from the Aboriginal words "bal" meaning "his" and "katta" meaning "hill". The name was recorded by Alexander Forrest in 1877 as referring to the northern portion of Careniup Swamp.

Before the 1960s, the area mainly consisted of market gardens, before residential and industry grew from the 1970s onwards.

The area became popular with Southern European migrant families, because it was one of the few areas that had not been settled and many migrant families wanted to build their own homes in their distinctive style, many complete with plaster figurines of lions and romanesque style columns adorning the front verandah and entry. Similarly, other European immigrant families had already settled in nearby suburbs such as Osborne Park, and made their living as market gardeners.

The area was especially popular with Macedonian families, leading to the establishment of Macedonian Cultural Centre "Ilinden" on Grindleford Place. Balcatta was also a popular area among other peoples from the Balkans.

As many of the older families pass on and others choose to update by building a newer home further north, the area is becoming increasingly popular with those of Asian cultural background, which has also led to some parts of Balcatta being subdivided into small units or villas.

== Areas of interest ==
=== Jones Street ===
The longest street in Balcatta. Winding through the locality, Jones Street has had repeated work done by the local council to resurface it out and make it safer for both pedestrians and motorists. A number of new round-abouts have been constructed in order to slow down traffic at various points on the road. Jones Street also runs past Takari Primary School and ends at Delawney Street behind the Water Corporation Depot and Stirling Recycling Plant.

=== Amelia Street ===
This hilly street runs east to west through Balcatta. It also goes past one side of Balcatta Senior High School.

=== Balcatta Senior High School ===
Balcatta Senior High School (BSHS) is the only public high school in Balcatta. A large percentage of its students are from non-Anglo Australian backgrounds. The school has specialist programs in the arts, such as dance and drama. BSHS was opened in 1967 and at the time was the northernmost school in the Perth metropolitan area.

=== Jones Paskin Reserve ===
This is a large oval mainly utilised in the summer as a cricket oval and for general use by the local community. This is the home ground of the Balcatta Cricket Club.

== Transport ==
=== Bus ===
- 402 Stirling Station to Perth Busport – serves Karrinyup Road
- 414 Stirling Station to Glendalough Station – serves Jones Street, Amelia Street and Main Street
- 415 Stirling Station to Mirrabooka Bus Station – serves Cedric Street and Amelia Street
- 416 Warwick Station to Mirrabooka Bus Station – serves Erindale Road, Balcatta Road and Wanneroo Road
- 427 Stirling Station to Warwick Station – serves Erindale Road
- 428 Stirling Station to Warwick Station – serves Cedric Street, Amelia Street, Odin Drive, Salmson Street, Dacre Street, Attra Street, Cadd Street, Knowles Street, Paskin Street, Jones Street, Natalie Way, Balcatta Road and Erindale Road
- 998 Fremantle Station to Fremantle Station (limited stops) – CircleRoute clockwise, serves Karrinyup Road and Morley Drive
- 999 Fremantle Station to Fremantle Station (limited stops) – CircleRoute anti-clockwise, serves Morley Drive and Karrinyup Road

Bus routes serving Wanneroo Road:

- 384 Perth Busport to Mirrabooka Bus Station
- 386 Perth Busport to Kingsway City
- 386X Perth Busport to Kingsway City (limited stops)
- 388 Perth Busport to Warwick Station
- 389 Perth Busport to Wanneroo
