= Electoral results for the Division of Moore =

Australian division election results

This is a list of electoral results for the Division of Moore in Australian federal elections from the division's creation in 1949 until the present.

== Members ==
Member	Party	Term
Hugh Leslie	Country	1949–1958
Vic Halbert	Liberal	1958–1961
Hugh Leslie	Country	1961–1963
Don Maisey	Country	1963–1974
John Hyde	Liberal	1974–1983
Allen Blanchard	Labor	1983–1990
Paul Filing	Liberal	1990–1995
Paul Filing	Independent	1995–1998
Mal Washer	Liberal	1998–2013
Ian Goodenough	Liberal	2013–2025
Tom French	Labor	2025–present

== Election results ==
=== Elections in the 2020s ===
==== 2025 ====
2025 Australian federal election: Moore
Party	Candidate	Votes	%	±%
Labor	Tom French	13,314	32.67	+0.24
Liberal	Vince Connelly	11,965	29.36	−11.85
Greens	Scott Mccarthy	4,884	11.98	−2.96
	Ian Goodenough	4,188	10.28	+10.28
Independent	Nathan Barton	2,810	6.89	+6.89
One Nation	Paul Fimognari	1,788	4.39	+1.02
Christians	Trevor Alan Bartley	979	2.40	+2.40
Trumpet of Patriots	Christopher Rennick	829	2.03	+1.20
Total formal votes		40,757	95.44	−0.13
Informal votes		1,949	4.56	+0.13
Turnout		42,706	35.06	

Results are not final. Last updated on 03 May 2025 at 11:00 PM AEST.

==== 2022 ====
2022 Australian federal election: Moore
Party	Candidate	Votes	%	±%
Liberal	Ian Goodenough	43,706	41.81	−9.69
Labor	Tom French	34,227	32.74	+7.99
Greens	Mark Cooper	14,902	14.26	+2.20
One Nation	Brian Brightman	3,541	3.39	−1.06
Western Australia	Peter Gunness	3,095	2.96	+1.32
United Australia	Helen Watkinson	2,342	2.24	+0.48
Great Australian	Sue Andersson	1,926	1.84	+1.84
Federation	Martin Suter	792	0.76	+0.76
Total formal votes		104,531	95.83	+0.69
Informal votes		4,545	4.17	−0.69
Turnout		109,076	91.43	−1.90
Two-party-preferred result
Liberal	Ian Goodenough	52,958	50.66	−10.96
Labor	Tom French	51,573	49.34	+10.96
Liberal hold		Swing	−10.96	

Alluvial diagram for preference flows in the seat of Moore in the 2022 federal election. indicates at what stage the winning candidate had over 50% of the votes and was declared the winner.

=== Elections in the 2010s ===
==== 2019 ====
2019 Australian federal election: Moore
Party	Candidate	Votes	%	±%
Liberal	Ian Goodenough	45,503	51.25	−3.73
Labor	Tony O'Gorman	21,760	24.51	−4.18
Greens	Daniel Vujcich	10,735	12.09	−0.59
One Nation	Tyler Walsh	4,113	4.63	+4.63
Independent	Ziggi Murphy	2,390	2.69	+2.69
United Australia	Rod Chilcott	1,591	1.79	+1.79
Western Australia	Jen Jacobs	1,428	1.61	+1.61
Christians	Rex Host	1,259	1.42	−2.23
Total formal votes		88,779	94.92	−1.88
Informal votes		4,748	5.08	+1.88
Turnout		93,527	92.12	+1.58
Two-party-preferred result
Liberal	Ian Goodenough	54,735	61.65	+0.63
Labor	Tony O'Gorman	34,044	38.35	−0.63
Liberal hold		Swing	+0.63	

==== 2016 ====
2016 Australian federal election: Moore
Party	Candidate	Votes	%	±%
Liberal	Ian Goodenough	48,133	54.98	+1.01
Labor	Tony Walker	25,118	28.69	+2.88
Greens	Daniel Lindley	11,100	12.68	+2.81
Christians	Maryka Groenewald	3,194	3.65	+1.85
Total formal votes		87,545	96.80	+1.14
Informal votes		2,891	3.20	−1.14
Turnout		90,436	90.54	−5.06
Two-party-preferred result
Liberal	Ian Goodenough	53,416	61.02	−1.42
Labor	Tony Walker	34,129	38.98	+1.42
Liberal hold		Swing	−1.42	

==== 2013 ====
2013 Australian federal election: Moore
Party	Candidate	Votes	%	±%
Liberal	Ian Goodenough	45,562	53.08	−1.08
Labor	Jason Lawrance	22,324	26.01	−0.36
Greens	Louahna Lloyd	8,539	9.95	−3.62
Palmer United	Gary Morris	5,745	6.69	+6.69
Christians	Rex Host	1,602	1.87	+1.87
Sports Party	Josh Catalano	1,324	1.54	+1.54
Rise Up Australia	Mary Pritchett	738	0.86	+0.86
Total formal votes		85,834	95.49	−0.16
Informal votes		4,055	4.51	+0.16
Turnout		89,889	92.48	−0.59
Two-party-preferred result
Liberal	Ian Goodenough	53,100	61.86	+0.67
Labor	Jason Lawrance	32,734	38.14	−0.67
Liberal hold		Swing	+0.67	

==== 2010 ====
2010 Australian federal election: Moore
Party	Candidate	Votes	%	±%
Liberal	Mal Washer	44,518	54.16	+0.12
Labor	Jeremy Brown	21,678	26.37	−6.64
Greens	Sheridan Young	11,159	13.57	+5.45
Christian Democrats	Meg Birch	1,804	2.19	+0.03
Family First	Paul Barrett	1,573	1.91	+0.68
One Nation	George Gault	1,471	1.79	+0.74
Total formal votes		82,203	95.65	−1.26
Informal votes		3,734	4.35	+1.26
Turnout		85,937	93.11	−0.65
Two-party-preferred result
Liberal	Mal Washer	50,302	61.19	+2.26
Labor	Jeremy Brown	31,901	38.81	−2.26
Liberal hold		Swing	+2.26	

=== Elections in the 2000s ===
==== 2007 ====
2007 Australian federal election: Moore
Party	Candidate	Votes	%	±%
Liberal	Mal Washer	38,262	54.45	−0.89
Labor	Geraldine Burgess	22,902	32.59	+1.14
Greens	Annette Pericic-Herrmann	5,906	8.40	+1.32
Christian Democrats	Lachlan Dungey	1,556	2.21	+0.09
Family First	Douglas Croker	811	1.15	+1.15
One Nation	George Gault	719	1.02	−1.02
Citizens Electoral Council	Arthur Harvey	115	0.16	−0.12
Total formal votes		70,271	97.03	+1.37
Informal votes		2,151	2.97	−1.37
Turnout		72,422	94.35	+0.45
Two-party-preferred result
Liberal	Mal Washer	41,576	59.17	−1.66
Labor	Geraldine Burgess	28,695	40.83	+1.66
Liberal hold		Swing	−1.66	

==== 2004 ====
2004 Australian federal election: Moore
Party	Candidate	Votes	%	±%
Liberal	Mal Washer	37,739	55.34	+6.35
Labor	Kim Young	21,446	31.45	−2.22
Greens	Thor Kerr	4,829	7.08	+1.66
Christian Democrats	Evelynne Wong	1,445	2.12	+2.12
One Nation	George Gault	1,388	2.04	−2.49
Democrats	Kevin Payne	1,160	1.70	−3.29
Citizens Electoral Council	Arthur Harvey	189	0.28	+0.28
Total formal votes		68,196	95.66	−0.38
Informal votes		3,092	4.34	+0.38
Turnout		71,288	93.90	−1.62
Two-party-preferred result
Liberal	Mal Washer	41,486	60.83	+4.79
Labor	Kim Young	26,710	39.17	−4.79
Liberal hold		Swing	+4.79	

==== 2001 ====
2001 Australian federal election: Moore
Party	Candidate	Votes	%	±%
Liberal	Mal Washer	33,302	48.99	+11.76
Labor	Kim Young	22,888	33.67	+3.96
Greens	Andrew Roy	3,683	5.42	+0.82
Democrats	Clive Oliver	3,391	4.99	+1.13
One Nation	John Evans	3,078	4.53	−1.83
Independent	Geof Henderson	1,640	2.41	+2.41
Total formal votes		67,982	96.04	−0.97
Informal votes		2,802	3.96	+0.97
Turnout		70,784	95.96	
Two-party-preferred result
Liberal	Mal Washer	38,096	56.04	+0.42
Labor	Kim Young	29,886	43.96	−0.42
Liberal hold		Swing	+0.42	

=== Elections in the 1990s ===
==== 1998 ====
1998 Australian federal election: Moore
Party	Candidate	Votes	%	±%
Liberal	Mal Washer	24,754	34.38	+8.00
Labor	Christine Power	21,743	30.20	+0.64
Independent	Paul Filing	14,739	20.47	−13.26
One Nation	Allison Walker	4,943	6.87	+6.87
Greens	Steve Magyar	3,209	4.46	+0.22
Democrats	Patti Lock	2,611	3.63	−1.01
Total formal votes		71,999	96.97	−0.61
Informal votes		2,248	3.03	+0.61
Turnout		74,247	95.71	−0.11
Two-party-preferred result
Liberal	Mal Washer	38,973	54.13	−4.40
Labor	Christine Power	33,026	45.87	+4.40
Liberal gain from Independent		Swing	−4.40	

==== 1996 ====
1996 Australian federal election: Moore
Party	Candidate	Votes	%	±%
Independent	Paul Filing	28,536	34.13	+34.13
Labor	Alistair Jones	23,766	28.43	−6.54
Liberal	Paul Stevenage	22,815	27.29	−27.52
Democrats	Sarah Gilfillan	3,777	4.52	+0.52
Greens	Bill Franssen	3,537	4.23	−1.43
Independent	Vicki Hancock	1,171	1.40	+1.40
Total formal votes		83,602	97.56	−0.59
Informal votes		2,095	2.44	+0.59
Turnout		85,697	95.83	−0.88
Notional two-party-preferred count
Liberal	Paul Stevenage	48,204	58.18	−0.55
Labor	Alistair Jones	34,648	41.82	+0.55
Two-candidate-preferred result
Independent	Paul Filing	54,538	65.48	+65.48
Labor	Alistair Jones	28,757	34.52	−6.74
Member changed to Independent from Liberal				

==== 1993 ====
1993 Australian federal election: Moore
Party	Candidate	Votes	%	±%
Liberal	Paul Filing	39,326	54.81	+5.65
Labor	Christine Power	25,089	34.97	+4.03
Greens	Stephen Magyar	4,063	5.66	−2.23
Democrats	Libby Brown	2,866	3.99	−6.77
Natural Law	Alex Novakovic	405	0.56	+0.6
Total formal votes		71,749	98.15	+0.85
Informal votes		1,354	1.85	−0.85
Turnout		73,103	96.71	
Two-party-preferred result
Liberal	Paul Filing	42,125	58.73	+1.81
Labor	Christine Power	29,606	41.27	−1.81
Liberal hold		Swing	+1.81	

==== 1990 ====
1990 Australian federal election: Moore
Party	Candidate	Votes	%	±%
Liberal	Paul Filing	30,355	49.2	+5.4
Labor	Allen Blanchard	19,105	30.9	−17.0
Democrats	Alan Lloyd	6,647	10.8	+10.8
Greens	Brian Steels	4,877	7.9	+7.9
Grey Power	Mark Watson	768	1.2	+1.2
Total formal votes		61,752	97.3	
Informal votes		1,718	2.7	
Turnout		63,470	95.9	
Two-party-preferred result
Liberal	Paul Filing	35,081	56.9	+6.3
Labor	Allen Blanchard	26,560	43.1	−6.3
Liberal hold		Swing	+6.3	

=== Elections in the 1980s ===
==== 1987 ====
1987 Australian federal election: Moore
Party	Candidate	Votes	%	±%
Labor	Allen Blanchard	33,022	53.7	−1.4
Liberal	Jim Crawley	23,370	38.0	−6.9
National	Geoff Gill	5,138	8.4	+8.4
Total formal votes		61,530	93.0	
Informal votes		4,610	7.0	
Turnout		66,140	94.5	
Two-party-preferred result
Labor	Allen Blanchard	33,940	55.2	+0.1
Liberal	Jim Crawley	27,587	44.8	−0.1
Labor hold		Swing	+0.1	

==== 1984 ====
1984 Australian federal election: Moore
Party	Candidate	Votes	%	±%
Labor	Allen Blanchard	29,672	55.1	−1.1
Liberal	Rita Waters	24,164	44.9	+6.4
Total formal votes		53,836	93.9	
Informal votes		3,519	6.1	
Turnout		57,355	94.1	
Labor hold		Swing	−4.21	

==== 1983 ====
1983 Australian federal election: Moore
Party	Candidate	Votes	%	±%
Labor	Allen Blanchard	42,557	54.1	+11.2
Liberal	John Hyde	31,952	40.6	−6.4
Democrats	Alan Needham	4,120	5.2	−2.6
Total formal votes		78,629	98.4	
Informal votes		1,255	1.6	
Turnout		79,884	93.8	
Two-party-preferred result
Labor	Allen Blanchard		57.2	+10.0
Liberal	John Hyde		42.8	−10.0
Labor gain from Liberal		Swing	+10.0	

==== 1980 ====
1980 Australian federal election: Moore
Party	Candidate	Votes	%	±%
Liberal	John Hyde	31,021	47.0	+3.2
Labor	Allen Blanchard	28,267	42.9	+15.1
Democrats	Donald McComish	5,152	7.8	−4.4
National Country	Gladwin Wood	1,506	2.3	−9.9
Total formal votes		65,946	97.5	
Informal votes		1,658	2.5	
Turnout		67,604	94.1	
Two-party-preferred result
Liberal	John Hyde	34,852	52.8	−11.1
Labor	Allen Blanchard	31,094	47.2	+11.1
Liberal hold		Swing	−11.1	

=== Elections in the 1970s ===
==== 1977 ====
1977 Australian federal election: Moore
Party	Candidate	Votes	%	±%
Liberal	John Hyde	29,516	47.8	−6.4
Labor	James Hansen	14,707	23.8	−8.6
Democrats	Patricia Edward	7,540	12.2	+12.2
National Country	Roy Clarke	7,530	12.2	−1.2
Progress	Maurice Brockwell	2,426	3.9	+3.9
Total formal votes		61,719	96.7	
Informal votes		2,116	3.3	
Turnout		63,835	94.9	
Two-party-preferred result
Liberal	John Hyde		67.9	+2.4
Labor	James Hansen		32.1	−2.4
Liberal hold		Swing	+2.4	

==== 1975 ====
1975 Australian federal election: Moore
Party	Candidate	Votes	%	±%
Liberal	John Hyde	38,845	56.0	+20.5
Labor	Allen Blanchard	21,230	30.6	−6.5
National Country	Graham Anderson	9,312	13.4	−12.7
Total formal votes		69,387	97.8	
Informal votes		1,583	2.2	
Turnout		70,970	95.3	
Two-party-preferred result
Liberal	John Hyde		67.2	+6.7
Labor	Allen Blanchard		32.8	−6.7
Liberal hold		Swing	+6.7	

==== 1974 ====
1974 Australian federal election: Moore
Party	Candidate	Votes	%	±%
Labor	Rodney Boland	21,220	37.1	−1.6
Liberal	John Hyde	20,279	35.5	+7.6
National Alliance	Don Maisey	14,889	26.1	−7.3
Australia	Syd Hickman	752	1.3	+1.3
Total formal votes		57,140	97.7	
Informal votes		1,322	2.3	
Turnout		58,462	95.9	
Two-party-preferred result
Liberal	John Hyde	34,565	60.5	+60.5
Labor	Rodney Boland	22,275	39.5	−1.4
Liberal gain from National Alliance		Swing	+1.4	

==== 1972 ====
1972 Australian federal election: Moore
Party	Candidate	Votes	%	±%
Labor	Peter Walsh	21,074	38.7	−3.1
Country	Don Maisey	15,647	28.8	−2.2
Liberal	John Hyde	15,197	27.9	+6.0
Democratic Labor	Benjamin Ballantyne	2,480	4.6	−0.7
Total formal votes		54,398	97.5	
Informal votes		1,380	2.5	
Turnout		55,778	95.3	
Two-party-preferred result
Country	Don Maisey	32,144	59.1	+3.6
Labor	Peter Walsh	22,254	40.9	−3.6
Country hold		Swing	+3.6	

=== Elections in the 1960s ===
==== 1969 ====
1969 Australian federal election: Moore
Party	Candidate	Votes	%	±%
Labor	Peter Walsh	18,829	41.8	+5.9
Country	Don Maisey	13,968	31.0	−3.0
Liberal	Ian Thompson	9,856	21.9	−3.5
Democratic Labor	John Deane	2,390	5.3	+0.6
Total formal votes		45,043	97.5	
Informal votes		1,162	2.5	
Turnout		46,205	94.6	
Two-party-preferred result
Country	Don Maisey	25,000	55.5	−5.0
Labor	Peter Walsh	20,043	44.5	+5.0
Country hold		Swing	−5.0	

==== 1966 ====
1966 Australian federal election: Moore
Party	Candidate	Votes	%	±%
Country	Don Maisey	14,815	35.8	+1.9
Labor	Mal Bryce	14,109	34.1	+2.0
Liberal	Harold Lundy	10,495	25.4	−8.6
Democratic Labor	Gavin O'Connor	1,963	4.7	+4.7
Total formal votes		41,382	96.5	
Informal votes		1,502	3.5	
Turnout		42,884	95.2	
Two-party-preferred result
Country	Don Maisey	25,791	62.3	+4.6
Labor	Mal Bryce	15,591	37.7	+37.7
Country hold		Swing	+4.6	

==== 1963 ====
1963 Australian federal election: Moore
Party	Candidate	Votes	%	±%
Liberal	Vic Halbert	12,876	34.0	−1.0
Country	Don Maisey	12,810	33.9	+3.1
Labor	Wilbur Bennett	12,146	32.1	+3.6
Total formal votes		37,832	98.3	
Informal votes		670	1.7	
Turnout		38,502	95.5	
Two-party-preferred result
Country	Don Maisey	21,847	57.7	+6.4
Liberal	Vic Halbert	15,985	42.3	−6.4
Country hold		Swing	+6.4	

==== 1961 ====
1961 Australian federal election: Moore
Party	Candidate	Votes	%	±%
Liberal	Vic Halbert	12,406	35.0	+2.7
Country	Hugh Leslie	10,910	30.8	−9.7
Labor	Wilbur Bennett	10,106	28.5	+1.3
Democratic Labor	John Crisafulli	1,986	5.6	+5.6
Total formal votes		35,408	96.6	
Informal votes		1,237	3.4	
Turnout		36,645	94.5	
Two-party-preferred result
Country	Hugh Leslie	18,172	51.3	+4.2
Liberal	Vic Halbert	17,236	48.7	−4.2
Country gain from Liberal		Swing	+4.2	

=== Elections in the 1950s ===
==== 1958 ====
1958 Australian federal election: Moore
Party	Candidate	Votes	%	±%
Country	Hugh Leslie	13,542	40.5	−59.5
Liberal	Vic Halbert	10,792	32.3	+32.3
Labor	Wilbur Bennett	9,073	27.2	+27.2
Total formal votes		33,407	96.7	
Informal votes		1,155	3.3	
Turnout		34,562	95.0	
Two-party-preferred result
Liberal	Vic Halbert	17,679	52.9	+52.9
Country	Hugh Leslie	15,728	47.1	−52.9
Liberal gain from Country		Swing	+52.9	

==== 1955 ====
1955 Australian federal election: Moore
Party	Candidate	Votes	%	±%
Country	Hugh Leslie	unopposed		
Country hold		Swing		

==== 1954 ====
1954 Australian federal election: Moore
Party	Candidate	Votes	%	±%
Country	Hugh Leslie	22,760	57.0	−2.4
Labor	Arthur Dargin	17,143	43.0	+2.4
Total formal votes		39,903	98.2	
Informal votes		741	1.8	
Turnout		40,644	96.1	
Country hold		Swing	−2.4	

==== 1951 ====
1951 Australian federal election: Moore
Party	Candidate	Votes	%	±%
Country	Hugh Leslie	19,921	59.6	+21.8
Labor	Arthur Hunter	13,492	40.4	+2.4
Total formal votes		33,413	96.8	
Informal votes		1,099	3.2	
Turnout		34,512	95.2	
Country hold		Swing	+0.6	

=== Elections in the 1940s ===
==== 1949 ====
1949 Australian federal election: Moore
Party	Candidate	Votes	%	±%
Labor	Kevin Byrne	12,282	38.0	−7.0
Country	Hugh Leslie	12,244	37.8	−17.2
Liberal	Ken Jones	7,836	24.2	+24.2
Total formal votes		32,362	97.3	
Informal votes		894	2.7	
Turnout		33,256	94.5	
Two-party-preferred result
Country	Hugh Leslie	19,098	59.0	+4.0
Labor	Kevin Byrne	13,264	41.0	−4.0
Country notional hold		Swing	+4.0	
