= Post-election pendulum for the 2001 Australian federal election =

Australia Post-election pendulum

The Mackerras pendulum as a way of predicting the outcome of an election contested between two major parties in a Westminster style lower house legislature such as the Australian House of Representatives, which is composed of single-member electorates and which uses a preferential voting system such as a Condorcet method or instant-runoff voting.

The pendulum works by lining up all of the seats held in Parliament for the government, the opposition and the crossbenches according to the percentage point margin they are held by on a two party preferred basis. This is also known as the swing required for the seat to change hands. Given a uniform swing to the opposition or government parties, the number of seats that change hands can be predicted.

Government seats (82)
Marginal
Hinkler	Qld	Paul Neville	NAT	0.04
Solomon	NT	Dave Tollner	CLP	0.09
Farrer	NSW	Sussan Ley	LIB	0.14 v NAT
Adelaide	SA	Trish Worth	LIB	0.22
Dobell	NSW	Ken Ticehurst	LIB	0.38
Canning	WA	Don Randall	LIB	0.38
Parramatta	NSW	Ross Cameron	LIB	1.15
McEwen	Vic	Fran Bailey	LIB	1.20
Paterson	NSW	Bob Baldwin	LIB	1.42
Herbert	Qld	Peter Lindsay	LIB	1.62
Richmond	NSW	Larry Anthony	NAT	1.68
Eden-Monaro	NSW	Gary Nairn	LIB	1.69
Deakin	Vic	Phil Barresi	LIB	1.74
Hindmarsh	SA	Chris Gallus	LIB	1.86
Longman	Qld	Mal Brough	LIB	2.72
Page	NSW	Ian Causley	NAT	2.77
Petrie	Qld	Teresa Gambaro	LIB	3.42
La Trobe	Vic	Bob Charles	LIB	3.67
Makin	SA	Trish Draper	LIB	3.76
Moreton	Qld	Gary Hardgrave	LIB	4.21
Kalgoorlie	WA	Barry Haase	LIB	4.34
Cowper	NSW	Luke Hartsuyker	NAT	4.73
Dunkley	Vic	Bruce Billson	LIB	5.42
Lindsay	NSW	Jackie Kelly	LIB	5.47
Corangamite	Vic	Stewart McArthur	LIB	5.67
Warringah	NSW	Tony Abbott	LIB	5.67 v IND
Dickson	Qld	Peter Dutton	LIB	5.97
Fairly safe
Moore	WA	Mal Washer	LIB	6.04
Aston	Vic	Chris Pearce	LIB	6.17
Leichhardt	Qld	Warren Entsch	LIB	6.39
Pearce	WA	Judi Moylan	LIB	6.87
Robertson	NSW	Jim Lloyd	LIB	6.98
Casey	Vic	Tony Smith	LIB	7.16
Boothby	SA	Andrew Southcott	LIB	7.35
Forde	Qld	Kay Elson	LIB	7.38
Forrest	WA	Geoff Prosser	LIB	7.61
Flinders	Vic	Greg Hunt	LIB	7.62
Bennelong	NSW	John Howard	LIB	7.70
Wentworth	NSW	Peter King	LIB	7.86
Tangney	WA	Daryl Williams	LIB	7.97
Dawson	Qld	De-Anne Kelly	NAT	7.99
Gippsland	Vic	Peter McGauran	NAT	8.02
Sturt	SA	Christopher Pyne	LIB	8.18
Higgins	Vic	Peter Costello	LIB	8.39
Blair	Qld	Cameron Thompson	LIB	8.50
Ryan	Qld	Michael Johnson	LIB	8.62
Macquarie	NSW	Kerry Bartlett	LIB	8.67
Parkes	NSW	John Cobb	NAT	8.74
Menzies	Vic	Kevin Andrews	LIB	8.94
Fairfax	Qld	Alex Somlyay	LIB	9.21
Goldstein	Vic	David Kemp	LIB	9.48
Wannon	Vic	David Hawker	LIB	9.58
Hume	NSW	Alby Schultz	LIB	9.79
Macarthur	NSW	Pat Farmer	LIB	9.96
Safe
Hughes	NSW	Danna Vale	LIB	10.41
Grey	SA	Barry Wakelin	LIB	10.56
Wide Bay	Qld	Warren Truss	NAT	10.73
Kooyong	Vic	Petro Georgiou	LIB	10.94
Indi	Vic	Sophie Panopoulos	LIB	11.19
Lyne	NSW	Mark Vaile	NAT	11.24
Fisher	Qld	Peter Slipper	LIB	12.06
Fadden	Qld	David Jull	LIB	12.29
McPherson	Qld	Margaret May	LIB	12.55
Mayo	SA	Alexander Downer	LIB	12.87
North Sydney	NSW	Joe Hockey	LIB	13.21
Curtin	WA	Julie Bishop	LIB	13.91
Cook	NSW	Bruce Baird	LIB	14.00
Wakefield	SA	Neil Andrew	LIB	14.57
Gilmore	NSW	Joanna Gash	LIB	14.63
Gwydir	NSW	John Anderson	NAT	14.88
Groom	Qld	Ian Macfarlane	LIB	15.09
Moncrieff	Qld	Steven Ciobo	LIB	15.42
Berowra	NSW	Philip Ruddock	LIB	15.65
Barker	SA	Patrick Secker	LIB	15.69
Maranoa	Qld	Bruce Scott	NAT	16.01
Mackellar	NSW	Bronwyn Bishop	LIB	16.87
O'Connor	WA	Wilson Tuckey	LIB	19.09
Mallee	Vic	John Forrest	NAT	19.93
Very safe
Bradfield	NSW	Brendan Nelson	LIB	21.16
Mitchell	NSW	Alan Cadman	LIB	21.32
Murray	Vic	Sharman Stone	LIB	23.93
Riverina	NSW	Kay Hull	NAT	29.88

Opposition seats (65)
Marginal
Bowman	Qld	Con Sciacca	ALP	1.42
Stirling	WA	Jann McFarlane	ALP	1.58
Hasluck	WA	Sharryn Jackson	ALP	1.78
Swan	WA	Kim Wilkie	ALP	2.04
Bass	Tas	Michelle O'Byrne	ALP	2.06
Kingston	SA	David Cox	ALP	2.42
McMillan	Vic	Christian Zahra	ALP	2.46
Ballarat	Vic	Catherine King	ALP	2.73
Chisholm	Vic	Anna Burke	ALP	2.77
Isaacs	Vic	Ann Corcoran	ALP	2.81
Banks	NSW	Daryl Melham	ALP	2.88
Greenway	NSW	Frank Mossfield	ALP	3.11
Brisbane	Qld	Arch Bevis	ALP	3.13
Bendigo	Vic	Steve Gibbons	ALP	3.57
Lowe	NSW	John Murphy	ALP	3.81
Lilley	Qld	Wayne Swan	ALP	4.83
Lingiari	NT	Warren Snowdon	ALP	5.29
Cowan	WA	Graham Edwards	ALP	5.51
Burke	Vic	Brendan O'Connor	ALP	5.51
Bruce	Vic	Alan Griffin	ALP	5.55
Jagajaga	Vic	Jenny Macklin	ALP	5.64
Griffith	Qld	Kevin Rudd	ALP	5.66
Melbourne Ports	Vic	Michael Danby	ALP	5.69
Braddon	Tas	Sid Sidebottom	ALP	5.96
Fairly safe
Barton	NSW	Robert McClelland	ALP	6.02
Charlton	NSW	Kelly Hoare	ALP	6.66
Rankin	Qld	Craig Emerson	ALP	6.68
Capricornia	Qld	Kirsten Livermore	ALP	6.86
Newcastle	NSW	Sharon Grierson	ALP	6.91
Franklin	Tas	Harry Quick	ALP	8.04
Oxley	Qld	Bernie Ripoll	ALP	8.14
Lyons	Tas	Dick Adams	ALP	8.17
Werriwa	NSW	Mark Latham	ALP	8.49
Corio	Vic	Gavan O'Connor	ALP	8.70
Shortland	NSW	Jill Hall	ALP	8.78
Kingsford Smith	NSW	Laurie Brereton	ALP	8.90
Canberra	ACT	Annette Ellis	ALP	9.44
Safe
Brand	WA	Kim Beazley	ALP	10.05
Bonython	SA	Martyn Evans	ALP	10.42
Cunningham	NSW	Stephen Martin	ALP	10.65
Fremantle	WA	Carmen Lawrence	ALP	10.72
Hunter	NSW	Joel Fitzgibbon	ALP	10.86
Hotham	Vic	Simon Crean	ALP	11.01
Perth	WA	Stephen Smith	ALP	11.21
Prospect	NSW	Janice Crosio	ALP	12.81
Fraser	ACT	Bob McMullan	ALP	12.96
Holt	Vic	Anthony Byrne	ALP	13.32
Denison	Tas	Duncan Kerr	ALP	14.26
Port Adelaide	SA	Rod Sawford	ALP	14.65
Sydney	NSW	Tanya Plibersek	ALP	15.04
Throsby	NSW	Jennie George	ALP	15.10
Blaxland	NSW	Michael Hatton	ALP	15.21
Chifley	NSW	Roger Price	ALP	15.29
Lalor	Vic	Julia Gillard	ALP	15.63
Reid	NSW	Laurie Ferguson	ALP	16.87
Watson	NSW	Leo McLeay	ALP	17.31
Maribyrnong	Vic	Bob Sercombe	ALP	17.38
Calwell	Vic	Maria Vamvakinou	ALP	17.73
Scullin	Vic	Harry Jenkins	ALP	19.17
Wills	Vic	Kelvin Thomson	ALP	19.42
Very safe
Melbourne	Vic	Lindsay Tanner	ALP	20.09
Grayndler	NSW	Anthony Albanese	ALP	21.29
Fowler	NSW	Julia Irwin	ALP	21.50
Gellibrand	Vic	Nicola Roxon	ALP	21.78
Batman	Vic	Martin Ferguson	ALP	25.08
Crossbench seats (3)
New England	NSW	Tony Windsor	IND	8.30 v NAT
Kennedy	Qld	Bob Katter	IND	19.73 v ALP
Calare	NSW	Peter Andren	IND	25.04 v NAT
