= AusCann =

Australian cannabis industry company

- Logo
- Traded as: ASX: AC8
- Headquarters: 35 Havelock Street, Perth, Australia
- Key people: Mal Washer
- Revenue: A$1,981,664,000 (2023)
- Total assets: A$18,450,158,000 (2023)
- Website: auscann.com.au

AusCann is a cannabis industry company based in Perth, Western Australia.

== History ==
AusCann was incorporated in September 2014, founded by former politician Mal Washer with businessmen Troy Langman and Harry Karelis.

In May 2015, AusCann announced that they were planning to grow cannabis sativa on Norfolk Island. The two-hectare site would provide up to ten tonnes of product, with plans to export to Canada. AusCann was the first company in Australia to be granted a license to grow and export medicinal cannabis. AusCann also explored the possibility of growing cannabis on Christmas Island. However, by late 2016, those plans were abandoned.

In January 2017, AusCann executed a reverse takeover of TW Holdings, which was a public company listed on the Australian Securities Exchange (ASX). Soon after, TW Holdings was renamed AusCann Group Holdings and given the new ASX code AC8.

In May 2017, AusCann partnered with Tasmanian Alkaloids to produce cannabis at its facility in Westbury, Tasmania.

CEO Layton Mills appeared on season 10 of Married at First Sight which aired in 2023.

In September 2024, AusCann was delisted from the Australian Securities Exchange for failing to pay listing fees.

In April 2025, AusCann signed a deal with Argent Biopharma to accelerate cannabinoid pharmaceutical development. The agreement reduces competition between the two firms and enables the sharing of technology.

== See also ==
- Cannabis in Australia
