= Vic Halbert =

Australian politician (1910–1997)

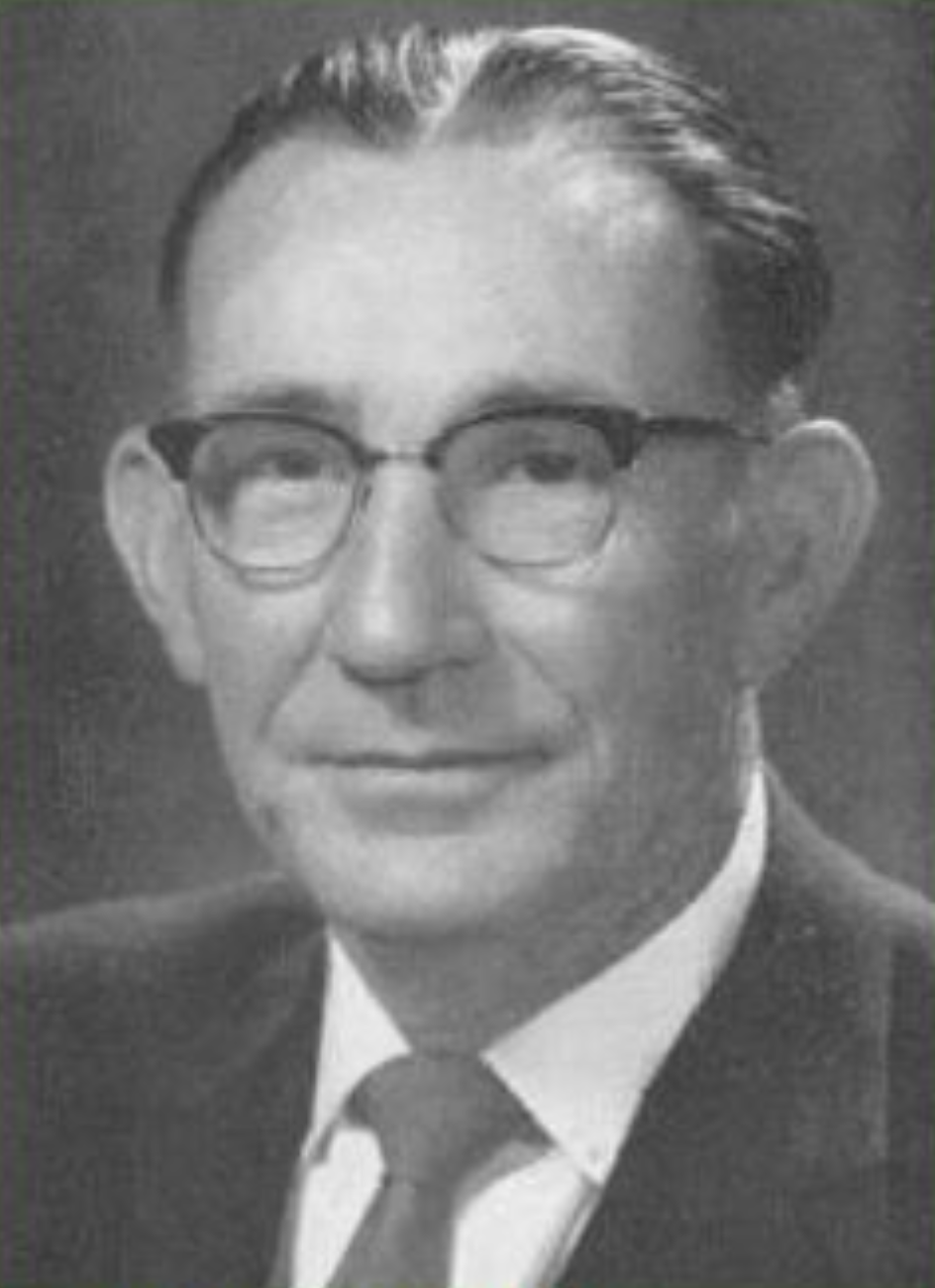

Member of the Australian Parliament for Moore
- In office 22 November 1958 – 9 December 1961
- Preceded by: Hugh Leslie
- Succeeded by: Hugh Leslie

Personal details
- Born: 17 January 1910 Meckering, Western Australia
- Died: 31 January 1997 (aged 87)
- Party: Liberal
- Occupation: Accountant, businessman

Hugh Victor Halbert (17 January 1910 – 31 January 1997) was an Australian politician. He was a member of the House of Representatives from 1958 to 1961, representing the Western Australian seat of Moore for the Liberal Party. He later served as the party's state president from 1965 to 1968.

== Early life ==
Halbert was born on 17 January 1910 in Meckering, Western Australia. He was educated at Hale School in Perth. After leaving school he returned to the Wheatbelt where he was an accountant and tax agent and ran a general store and agency in Cunderdin. According to The Bulletin, he was "deeply involved with his township's projects", for which he was awarded the Queen's Service Medal in 1954. He was a talented tennis player and was involved in the creation of sporting facilities in Cunderdin.

== Politics ==
Halbert was an inaugural member of the Liberal Party in Western Australia and was nominated to its provisional executive in January 1945.

Halbert was elected to the House of Representatives at the 1958 federal election, winning the seat of Moore for the Liberal Party from the incumbent Country Party MP Hugh Leslie. He was elected largely on Democratic Labor Party preferences. Leslie had been elected unopposed at the 1955 election and the Liberal Party reportedly only endorsed a candidate when they became aware the Australian Labor Party (ALP) was intending to stand in Moore.

In parliament, Halbert was a strong supporter of the Menzies government. He lost his seat back to Leslie after a single term at the 1961 election. His defeat was attributed to the ALP's decision to direct its preferences to Leslie. Halbert was unsuccessful in his attempt to reclaim his seat at the 1963 election, despite Leslie retiring shortly before the election campaign and being replaced by a new Country Party candidate, Don Maisey. His decision to re-contest the seat was the source of tensions within the Coalition, with the Country Party announcing plans to contest the seat of Forrest against incumbent Liberal MP Gordon Freeth as a form of retaliation.

At the 1964 Senate election, Halbert was placed on third position on the Liberal Party's Senate ticket but was defeated by Country Party candidate Tom Drake-Brockman for the final seat. He was also an unsuccessful candidate for the casual vacancy caused by the death of Shane Paltridge in 1966, losing to Reg Withers.

Halbert served as state president of the Liberal Party from 1965 to 1968. Relations between him and the Country Party remained poor; in November 1966 he publicly accused Country Party leader John McEwen of making false claims about the Liberal Party's involvement with the Basic Industries Group, an organisation campaigning against Country Party candidates.

== Personal life ==
Halbert died on 31 January 1997, aged 87.

Parliament of Australia
Preceded by Hugh Leslie	Member for Moore; 1958–1961	Succeeded by Hugh Leslie
