= Paul Filing =

Australian politician (born 1955)

Member of the Australian Parliament for Moore
- In office 24 March 1990 – 3 October 1998
- Preceded by: Allen Blanchard
- Succeeded by: Mal Washer

Personal details
- Born: 20 December 1955 (age 70) Wegberg, West Germany
- Party: Pauline Hanson's One Nation (2018–present); Independent (1995–98); Liberal (1990–95)
- Spouse: Geraldine Filing
- Children: James Filing, Phillip Filing and Isabelle Filing
- Occupation: Police officer

Paul Anthony Filing (born 20 December 1955) is an Australian former politician.

Born in Wegberg, Germany, he was a police officer and company manager in Australia before entering politics. From 1987 to 1989, he was Campaign Co-ordinator for the Liberal Party in Western Australia. In 1990, he was elected to the Australian House of Representatives as the Liberal member for Moore, defeating sitting Labor member Allen Blanchard. Filing was helped by a redistribution that turned Moore from a safe Labor seat to a notionally marginal Liberal seat.

He served as Parliamentary Secretary to the Leader of the Opposition, John Hewson and Opposition Deputy Whip. In April 1995, he was defeated for Liberal preselection to contest Moore at the next election, as part of "a bitter power struggle in the WA branch involving Senator Noel Crichton-Browne". He resigned from the party on 18 June 1995 to become an independent, although he stated he would continue to vote with the Coalition. He contested and won the seat of Moore as an independent in that election. His vote dropped dramatically in 1998 and he was eliminated on the fourth count, when Mal Washer regained the seat for the Liberals.

After leaving politics, Filing owned and operated Aussie Home Loans mortgage broking franchise stores at Joondalup, Currambine, Belmont, Midland, Fremantle, Gosnells and Kalamunda in Perth's metropolitan area.

In 2018, Filing was appointed president of Pauline Hanson's One Nation in Western Australia and was One Nation's lead Western Australian senate candidate at the 2022 Australian federal election but was not elected.

Parliament of Australia
Preceded by Allen Blanchard	Member for Moore; 1990–1998	Succeeded by Mal Washer
