= Tom French (Australian politician) =

Australian politician (born 1983)

Tom French MP

Member of the Australian Parliament for Moore
- Incumbent
- Assumed office 3 May 2025
- Preceded by: Ian Goodenough

Personal details
- Born: 21 June 1983 (age 43)
- Party: Labor
- Website: www.alp.org.au/our-people/our-people/tom-french/

Thomas Alan French (born 21 June 1983) is an Australian politician. He is member of the Australian Parliament for the Division of Moore representing the Labor Party after winning the seat in the 2025 Australian federal election.

== Early life and career ==
French grew up in regional New South Wales before moving to Western Australia. French has been described as a tradie from Perth. He is an electrician and lawyer and has worked in hospitality and business management.

== Political career ==
French was previously a Labor candidate, unsuccessfully contesting Pearce in the 2016 Australian federal election and Moore in the 2022 Australian federal election.

He was the 4th candidate in the East Metropolitan Region for the Western Australian Legislative Council at the 2017 state election. He was the 4th candidate in Western Australia at the 2019 Australian Senate election.

French was selected again to stand in the 2025 Australian federal election against independent MP (former Liberal) Ian Goodenough. French was elected unseating Goodenough. It was previously described as a safe seat for the Liberal Party. He is the first Labor MP for the seat of Moore since 1990, and second ever in its history.

== Personal life ==
French is the father of two sons. He underwent a kidney transplant, receiving the organ from his brother, and has spoken publicly about the experience with gratitude.

In his inaugural speech to parliament, French reflected on his working-class upbringing, describing himself as “the son of a painter who was the son of a painter,” and highlighted the influence of his family and personal experiences on his political outlook. He also drew on cultural influences, quoting lyrics from the rock band Everclear, a line from the musical Hamilton, and the poem “First They Came” by Martin Niemöller, emphasising the role of storytelling and the arts in shaping community and politics.

Parliament of Australia
Preceded by Ian Goodenough	Member for Moore; 2025–present	Incumbent
