= John Hyde (Australian federal politician) =

Australian politician

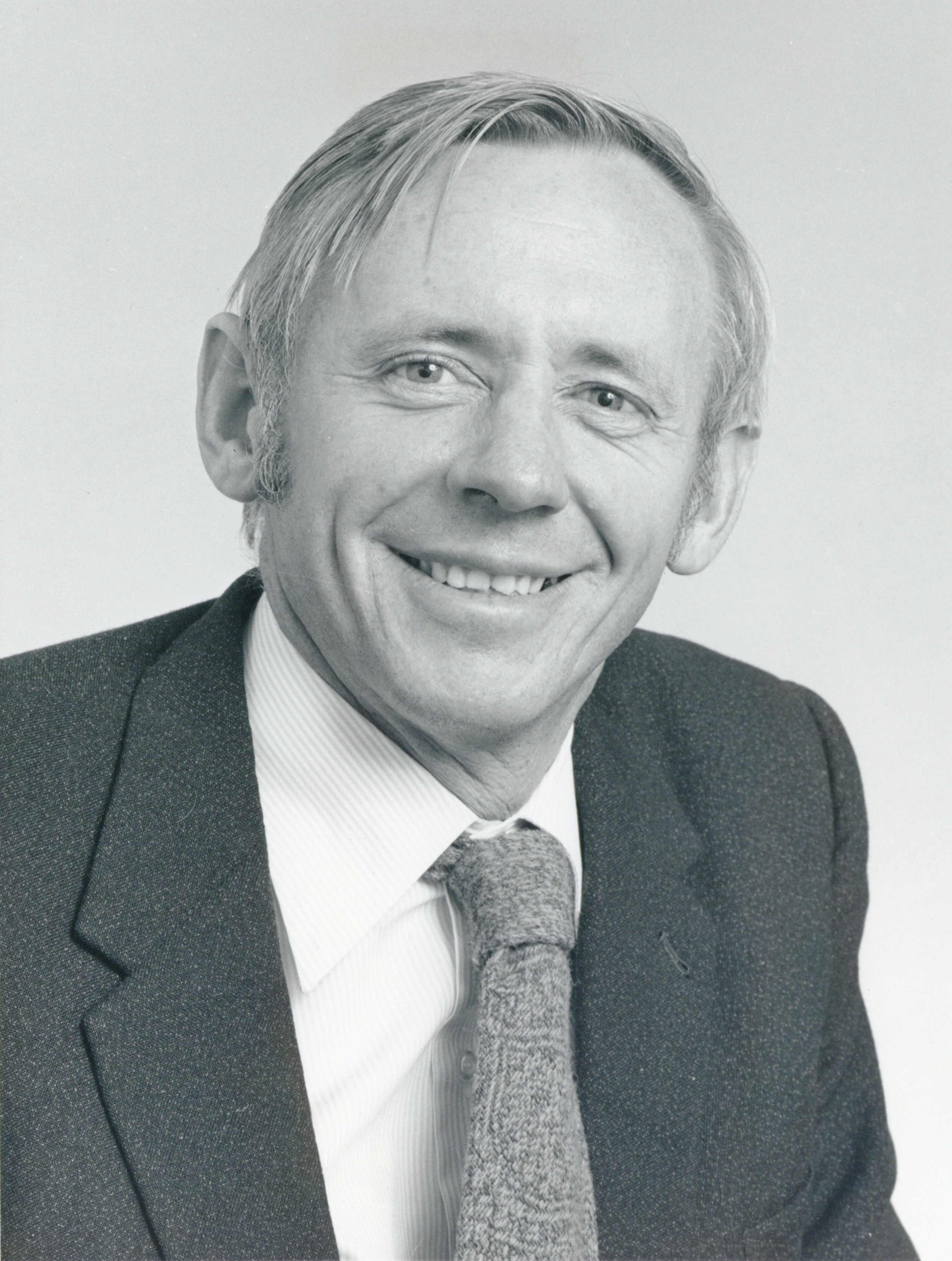

Member of the Australian Parliament for Moore
- In office 18 May 1974 – 5 March 1983
- Preceded by: Don Maisey
- Succeeded by: Allen Blanchard

Personal details
- Born: 2 February 1936 (age 90) Western Australia
- Party: Liberal Party of Australia
- Occupation: Farmer

John Martin Hyde (born 2 February 1936) is an Australian former politician. He was the member for the Division of Moore in Western Australia for the Liberal Party from 1974 to 1983.

== Biography ==
Hyde was born and educated in Western Australia before farming wheat and sheep at Dalwallinu. He lost his right arm as a result of a farming accident. A successful farmer, he was a councillor and deputy-President of the Shire of Dalwallinu and won the federal seat of Moore in 1974, holding it until he was defeated in 1983. With three other MPs he formed "the Dries" which were then a backbench group which advocated economic conservatism and soundness in public finances and rejected short-term populism. He opposed the economic policies of the Whitlam Government which was dismissed in November 1975, and also many of the policies of the succeeding Fraser Government which he considered to be in many ways hardly if at all better.

Among his campaigns was to stop the two-airline monopoly and various subsidies to the aircraft, shipping and car industries (former Navy Minister and "Dry" Bert Kelly, author of "The Modest Member" and "The Modest Farmer" columns in various papers, had described the aircraft and shipping industries in Australia as "Our flying and floating feather beds."). Hyde's central concern was the harm being done to the Australian economy, particularly to the export industries, by tariffs and other trade-barriers, and he approved Whitlam's 25% across-the-board tariff cut, though it was unpopular with much of his own party, or at least seen by them as something to be used against Labor. Indeed, although a competent and professional politician and a hard-working electorate member, his outspoken and independent attitude and readiness to express his strong economic convictions, probably affected his career within the Liberal Party adversely. Despite his undoubted high abilities, his frequent outspoken opposition to Fraser probably prevented him being considered for the Ministry which his intelligence and grasp of affairs would ordinarily have warranted.

Upon his defeat in 1983, with the Clough family, he developed the Australian Institute for Public Policy in Perth and was its executive director until it merged with the Institute of Public Affairs (IPA), a rather similar "dry" and pro-free-enterprise think tank. He had joined the IPA on a part-time basis in 1988, and he took it over from the Kemp brothers (also Liberal MPs) and ran it from 1991 to 1995. His wife Helen also worked there.

Political scientist Professor Patrick O'Brien of the University of Western Australia described him as: "The only ex-politician I know who continues to do sane and useful work." A feature of the AIPP was a weekly "Soviet" where new ideas could be put forward by all staff and discussed.

A disciple of Bert Kelly, he wrote a long series of articles in The Australian and elsewhere, mainly on economic topics. In 2002 he wrote a book, Dry, published by the IPA and mainly concerned with the fight for public economic conservatism during the years of the Fraser Government, and the elimination of uneconomic tariffs and bounties. Although critical of some of Prime Minister John Howard's policies, he wrote of him warmly in Dry as "a man of more than ordinary decency."

He and his wife Helen are notable growers of roses. They wrote the book Ellenbee: A Tale of Roses Among Gum Trees in 2006.

Parliament of Australia
| Preceded by Don Maisey | Member for Moore; 1974–1983 | Succeeded by Allen Blanchard |
Non-profit organization positions
| Unknown | Executive Director of Institute of Public Affairs; 1991-1995 | Succeeded by Mike Nahan |
