= Allen Blanchard =

Australian politician (1929–2008)

Member of the Australian Parliament for Moore
- In office 5 March 1983 – 24 March 1990
- Preceded by: John Hyde
- Succeeded by: Paul Filing

Personal details
- Born: Cecil Allen Blanchard; 17 April 1929 London, England
- Died: 25 October 2008 (aged 79)
- Party: Australian Labor Party
- Education: University of London
- Occupation: Criminologist

Cecil Allen Blanchard (17 April 1929 – 25 October 2008) was an Australian federal politician.

== Biography ==
Born in London, England, Blanchard migrated to Australia, where he was educated at the Institute of Technology in Western Australia. He subsequently returned to England for tertiary education at the University of London, and later became a social worker and criminologist, before taking up a post as a training and staff development officer.

In 1983, he was elected to the Australian House of Representatives as the Labor member for the Division of Moore, defeating sitting Liberal member John Hyde. He held the seat until 1990, when a redistribution made his seat marginally Liberal. He opted to run for reelection, and was defeated by Liberal Paul Filing on a swing of six percent.

In 1987, he headed an inquiry into the Aboriginal homelands movement in Australia, by the House of Representatives Standing Committee on Aboriginal Affairs.

Parliament of Australia
Preceded by John Hyde	Member for Moore; 1983–1990	Succeeded by Paul Filing
