= 2001 Australian House of Representatives election =

2001 House of Representatives elections
- 10 November 2001
- All 150 seats in the Australian House of Representatives; 76 seats needed for a majority
- Turnout: 94.3%
Party	Leader	Vote %	Seats	+/–
Liberal	John Howard	37.08%	68	+4
Labor	Kim Beazley	37.84%	65	−2
National	John Anderson	5.61%	13	−3
Country Liberal	Denis Burke	0.32%	1	+1
This lists parties that won seats. See the complete results below.
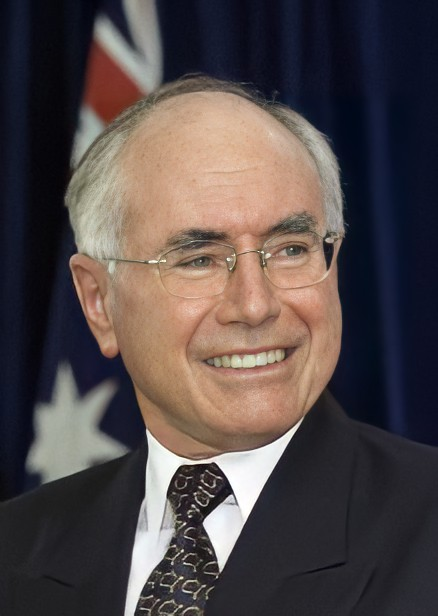

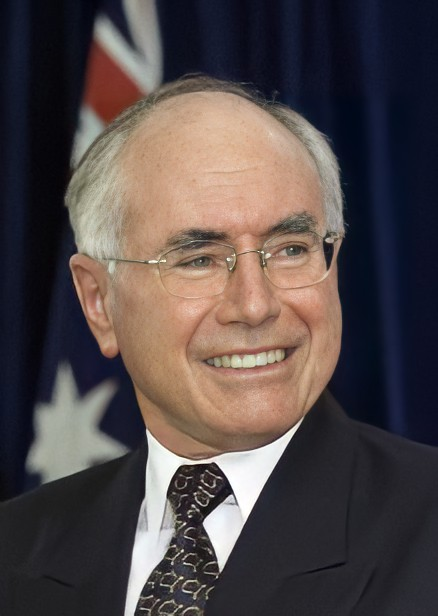
Prime Minister before	Prime Minister after
John Howard; Coalition	John Howard; Coalition

The following tables show results for the Australian House of Representatives at the 2001 federal election held on 10 November 2001. The parliament increased from 148 to 150 seats, with a new seat in Western Australia and a new seat in the Northern Territory.

== Australia ==
House of Reps (IRV) — 2001–04 – Turnout 94.85% (CV) — Informal 4.82%
Party	Votes	%	Swing	Seats	Change
Liberal	4,254,071	37.08	+3.19	68	▲4
National	643,926	5.61	+0.32	13	▼3
Country Liberal	36,961	0.32	–0.00	1	▲1
Liberal–National coalition	4,934,958	43.01	+3.50	82	▲2
Labor	4,341,420	37.84	−2.26	65	▼2
Democrats	620,198	5.41	+0.28	0	Steady
Greens	569,074	4.96	+2.82	0	Steady
One Nation	498,032	4.34	−4.09	0	Steady
Christian Democrats	69,294	0.60	+0.02	0	Steady
Unity	24,653	0.21	−0.58	0	Steady
Citizens Electoral Council	18,352	0.16	+0.09	0	Steady
Liberals for Forests	16,042	0.14	+0.14	0	Steady
No GST	14,164	0.12	+0.10	0	Steady
Against Further Immigration	12,033	0.10	+0.10	0	Steady
Save the ADI Site	6,029	0.05	+0.05	0	Steady
Progressive Labour	4,467	0.04	−0.02	0	Steady
Lower Excise Fuel	4,292	0.04	+0.04	0	Steady
HEMP	3,277	0.03	+0.03	0	Steady
Curtin Labor Alliance	2,496	0.02	+0.02	0	Steady
Non-Custodial Parents	769	0.01	+0.01	0	Steady
Fishing Party	720	0.01	+0.01	0	Steady
Tasmania First	621	0.01	−0.03	0	Steady
Outdoor Recreation	485	0.00	+0.00	0	Steady
Independents	332,118	2.89	+1.00	3	▲2
Total	11,474,074			150	▲2
Two-party-preferred vote
Coalition	5,846,289	50.95	+1.93	82	▲2
Labor	5,627,785	49.05	−1.93	65	▼2
Invalid/blank votes	580,591	4.82	+1.05		
Turnout	12,054,665	94.85			
Registered voters	12,708,837				
Source: AEC Tally Room

Independents: Peter Andren, Tony Windsor, Bob Katter

== States ==
=== New South Wales ===
2001 Australian federal election (New South Wales)
- 10 November 2001

All 50 New South Wales seats in the Australian House of Representatives and 6 seats in the Australian Senate
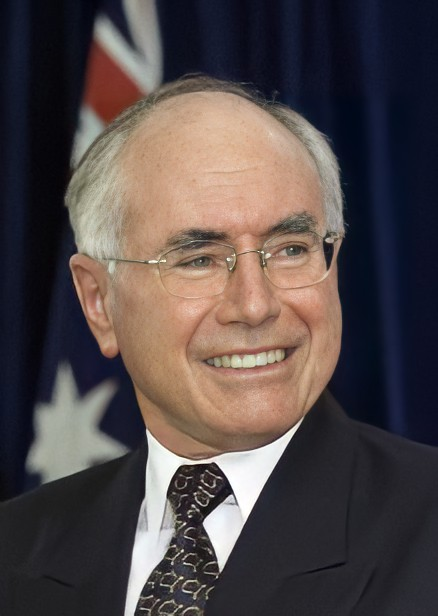

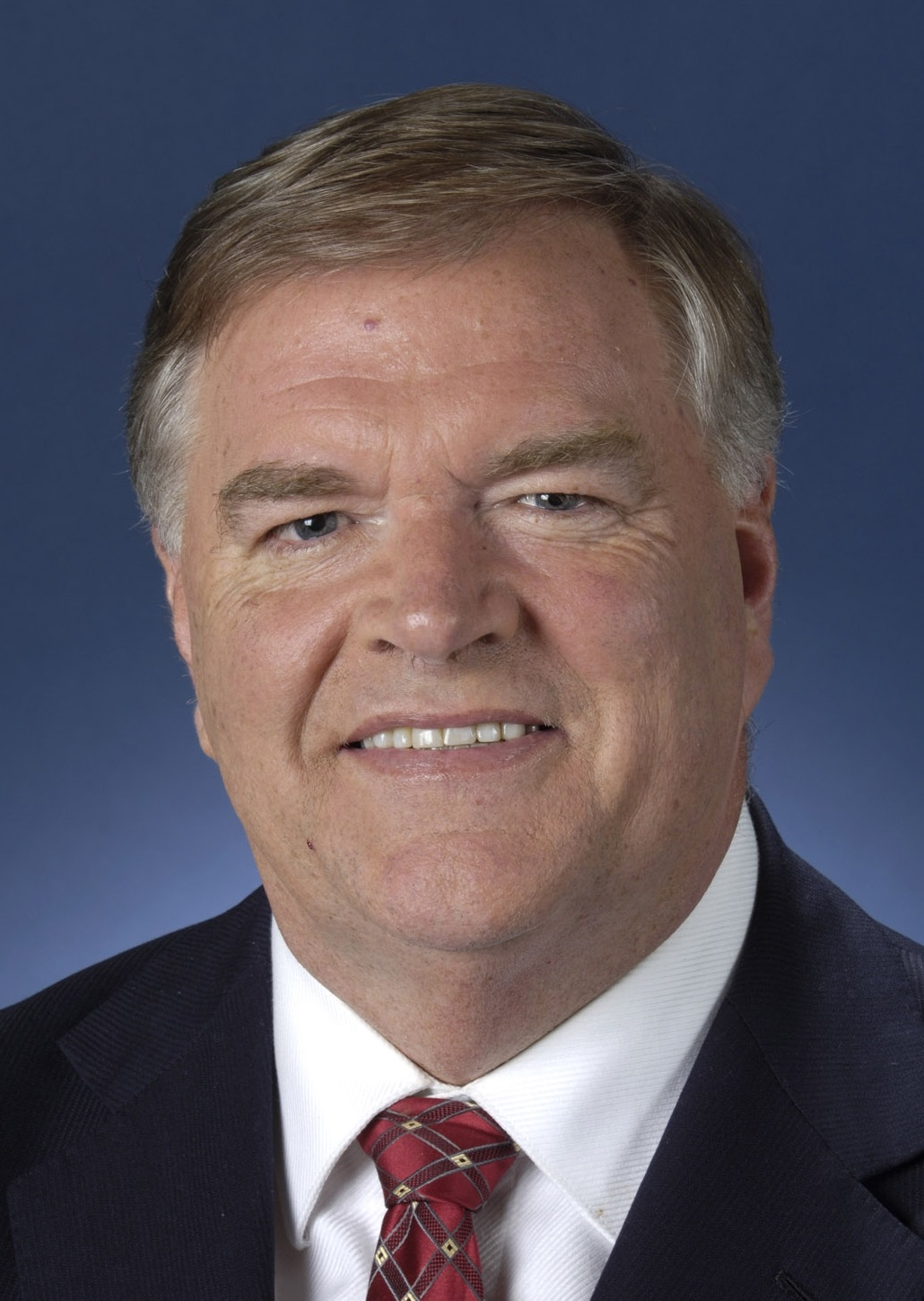
	First party	Second party
Leader	John Howard	Kim Beazley
Party	Liberal/National coalition	Labor
Last election	27 seats	22 seats
Seats won	28 seats	20 seats
Seat change	▲1	▼2
Popular vote	1,621,580	1,380,822
Percentage	42.80%	36.45%
Swing	▲4.41	▼3.67
TPP	52.14%	47.86%
TPP swing	▲3.68	▼3.68

Turnout 99.60% (CV) — Informal 3.40%
Party	Votes	%	Swing	Seats	Change
Liberal	1,272,208	33.58	3.09	21	▲3
National	349,372	9.22	1.32	7	▼2
Liberal/National Coalition	1,621,580	42.80	4.41	28	▲1
Labor	1,380,822	36.45	–3.67	20	▼2
One Nation	180,812	4.77	–4.19		
Greens	180,079	4.75	2.09		
Democrats	160,706	4.24	0.08		
Independent	148,042	3.91	3.02	2	▲1
Christian Democrats	46,059	1.22	0.19		
Unity	24,653	0.65	–0.90		
AAFI	12,033	0.32			
Save the ADI Site	6,029	0.16			
Citizens Electoral Council	5,746	0.15			
No GST	4,858	0.13			
Progressive Labour	4,467	0.12			
Lower Excise Fuel	3,098	0.08			
HEMP	2,193	0.06			
Non-Custodial Parents	0,769	0.02			
Fishing Party	0,720	0.02			
Total	3,788,459			50	
Two-party-preferred vote
Liberal/National Coalition	1,811,019	52.14	+3.68	28	▲1
Labor	1,662,190	48.46	–3.68	20	▼2
Invalid/blank votes	217,024	5.42	+1.41		
Turnout	4,005,483	95.27			
Registered voters	4,204,383				
Source: AEC Tally Room

=== Victoria ===
2001 Australian federal election (Victoria)
- 10 November 2001

All 37 Victoria seats in the Australian House of Representatives and 6 seats in the Australian Senate
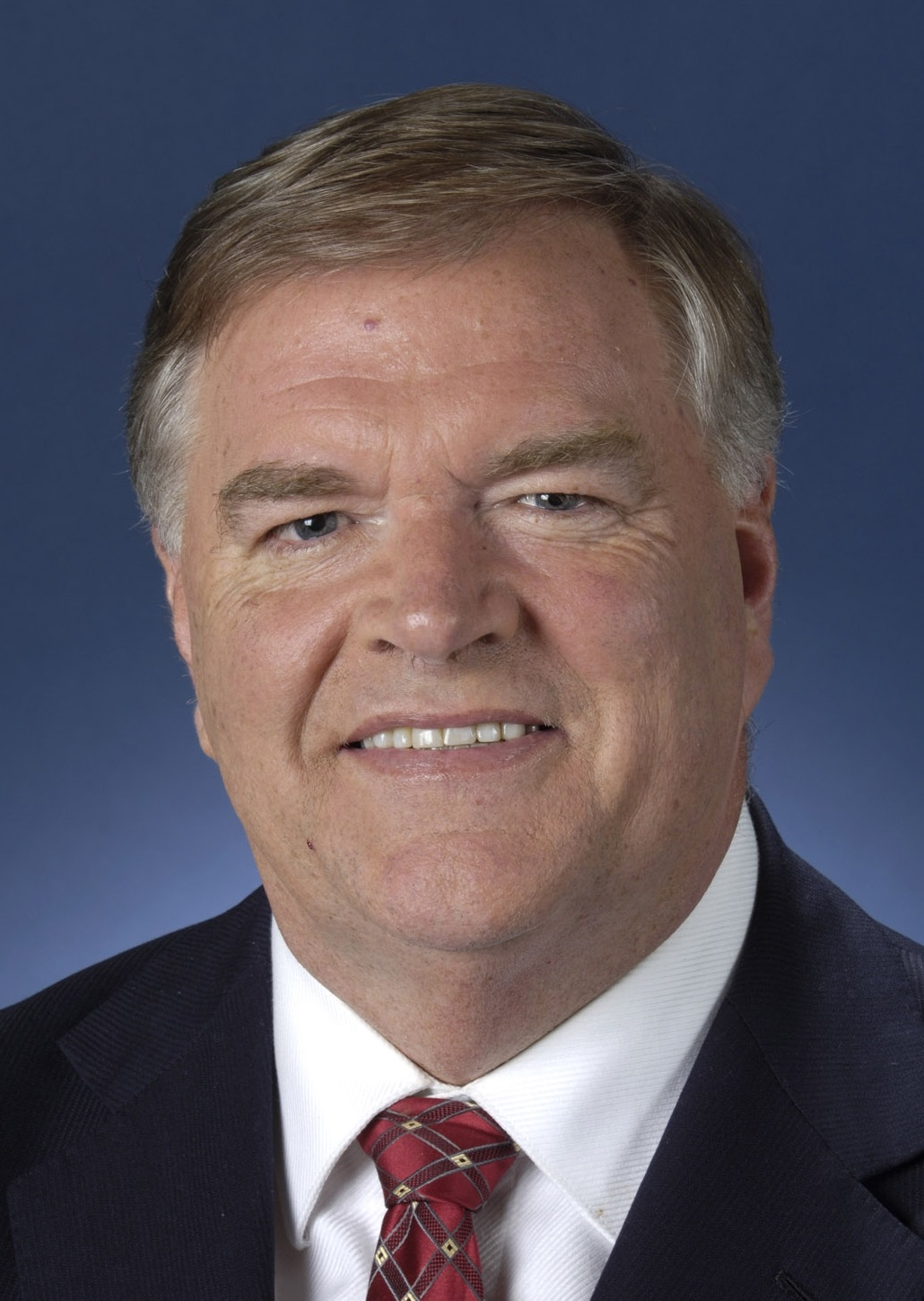

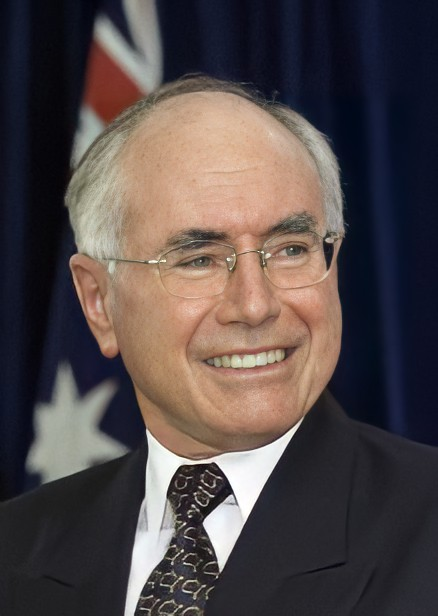
	First party	Second party
Leader	Kim Beazley	John Howard
Party	Labor	Liberal/National coalition
Last election	19 seats	16 seats
Seats won	20 seats	15 seats
Seat change	▲1	▼1
Popular vote	1,230,757	1,245,542
Percentage	41.65%	42.15%
Swing	▼2.72	▲2.35
TPP	53.05%	46.95%
TPP swing	▲1.65	▼1.65

Turnout 99.60% (CV) — Informal 3.40%
Party	Votes	%	Swing	Seats	Change
Liberal	1,154,493	39.07	1.99	15	▼1
National	91,049	3.08	0.36	2	Steady
Liberal/National Coalition	1,245,542	42.15	2.35	17	▼1
Labor	1,230,757	41.65	–2.72	20	▲1
Democrats	184,582	6.25	0.23		
Greens	174,399	5.90	3.81		
Independents	60,801	0.02			
One Nation	37,811	1.28	–2.44		
Citizens Electoral Council	6,692	0.23	0.08		
Christian Democrats	6,188	0.21	0.08		
No GST	5,104	0.17			
Liberals for Forests	1,960	0.07			
Lower Excise Fuel	1,194	0.04			
Total	2,955,031			37	
Two-party-preferred vote
Labor	1,540,614	52.14	–1.39	20	▲1
Liberal/National Coalition	1,414,417	46.47	+1.39	17	▼1
Invalid/blank votes	122,525	3.68	+0.47		
Turnout	2,955,031	95.61			
Registered voters	3,218,746				
Source: AEC Tally Room

=== Queensland ===
2001 Australian federal election (Queensland)
- 10 November 2001

All 27 Queensland seats in the Australian House of Representatives and 6 seats in the Australian Senate
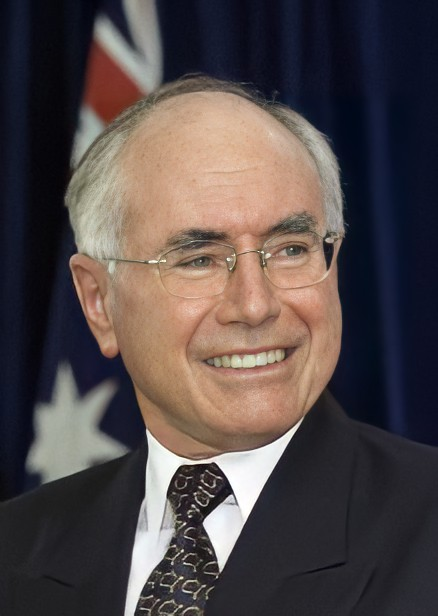

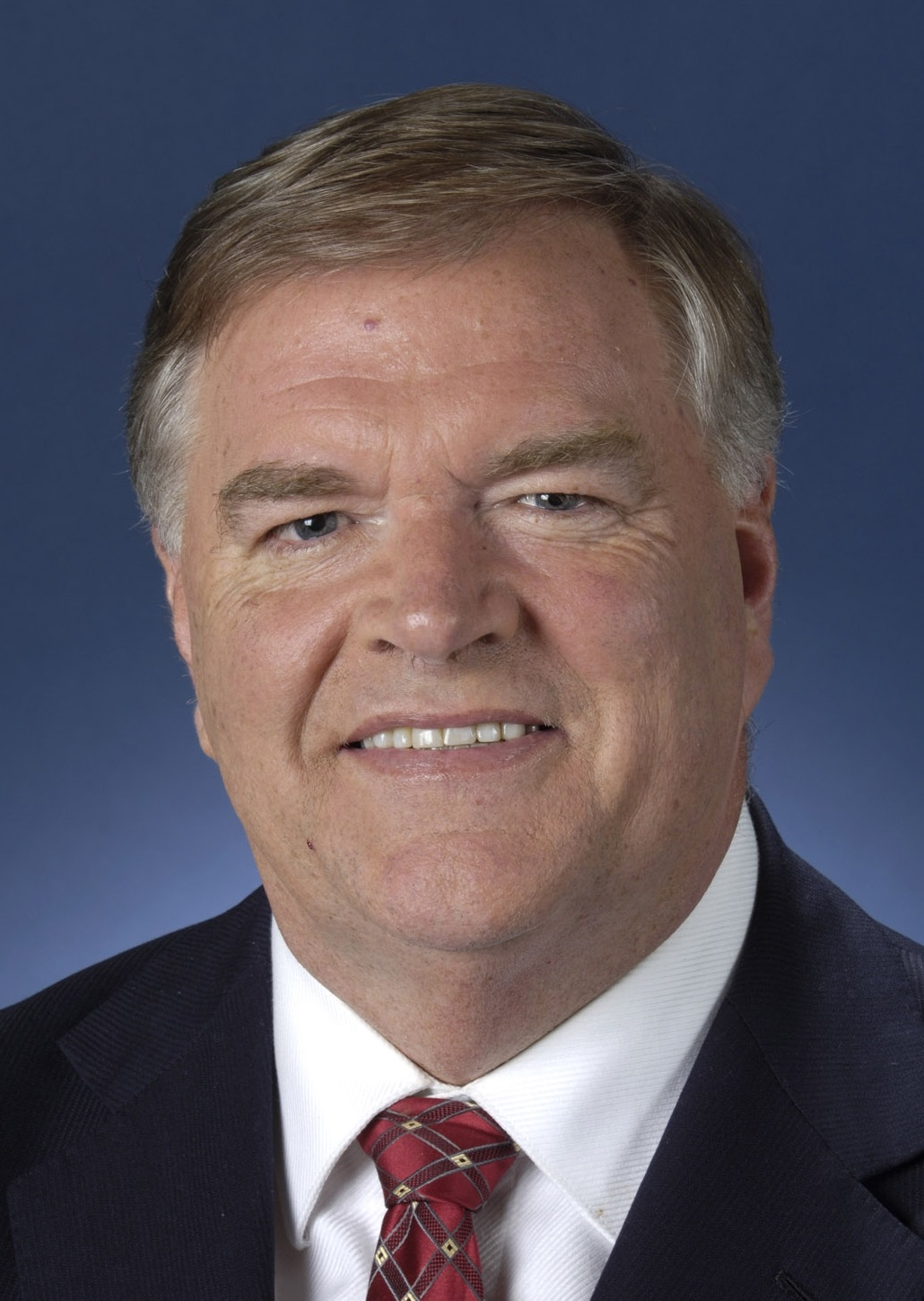
	First party	Second party
Leader	John Howard	Kim Beazley
Party	Liberal/National coalition	Labor
Last election	18 seats	8 seats
Seats won	19 seats	7 seats
Seat change	▲1	▼1
Popular vote	960,410	730,920
Percentage	45.60%	34.70%
Swing	▲4.74	▼1.40
TPP	53.05%	46.95%
TPP swing	▲1.65	▼1.65

Turnout 99.60% (CV) — Informal 3.40%
Party	Votes	%	Swing	Seats	Change
Liberal	767,959	36.46	5.60	15	▲1
National	192,451	9.14	–0.86	4	▼1
Liberal/National Coalition	960,410	45.60	+4.74	19	Steady
Labor	730,920	34.70	–1.40	7	▼1
One Nation	148,930	7.07	–7.28	0	Steady
Independent	148,620	7.06		1	▲1
Democrats	90,679	4.31	0.29		
Greens	73,467	3.49	1.11		
Citizens Electoral Council	2,849	0.14			
HEMP	1,084	0.05			
Outdoor Recreation	485	0.02			
Total	2,106,255			27	
Two-party-preferred vote
Liberal	1,110,905	53.05	+1.65	19	▲1
Labor	919,867	46.95	–1.65	7	▼1
Invalid/blank votes	106,976	4.83	+1.50		
Turnout	2,213,231	95.42			
Registered voters	2,319,481				
Source: AEC Tally Room

=== Western Australia ===
2001 Australian federal election (Western Australia)
- 10 November 2001

All 15 Western Australian seats in the Australian House of Representatives and 6 seats in the Australian Senate
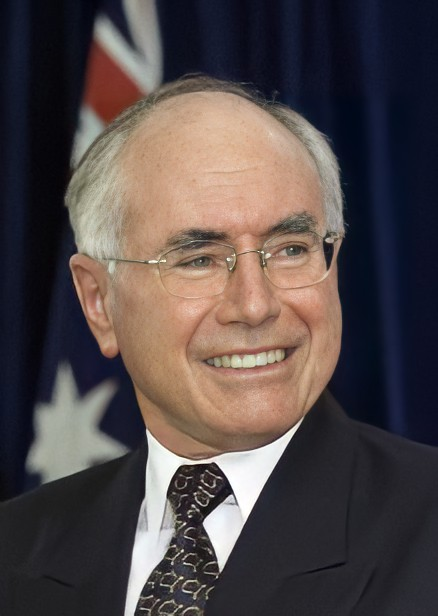

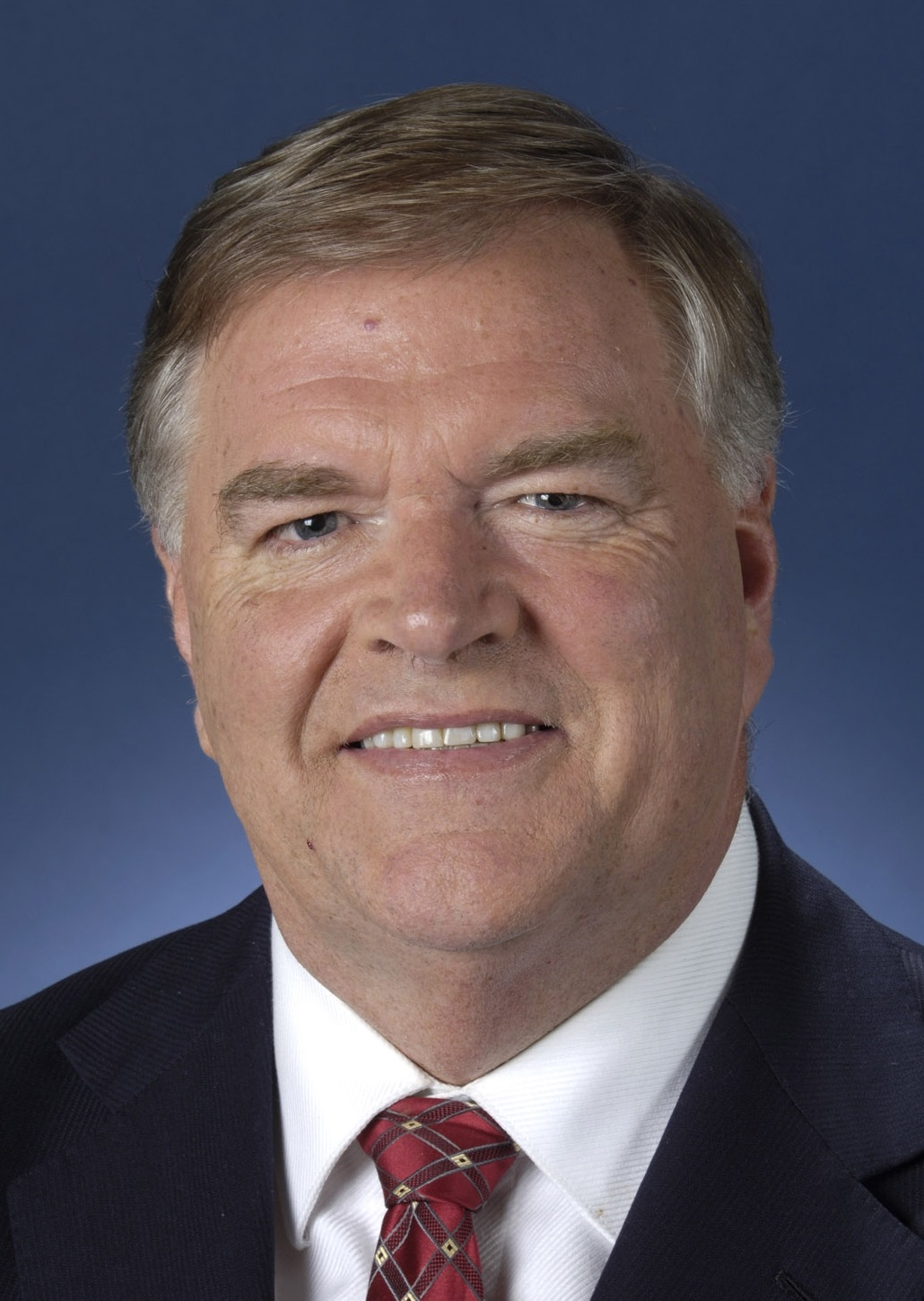
	First party	Second party
Leader	John Howard	Kim Beazley
Party	Liberal/National coalition	Labor
Last election	7 seats	7 seats
Seats won	8 seats	7 seats
Seat change	▲1	Steady
Popular vote	449,036	402,927
Percentage	41.39%	37.14%
Swing	▲3.24	▼0.29
TPP	51.62%	48.38%
TPP swing	▲1.08	▼1.08

Turnout 99.60% (CV) — Informal 3.40%
Party	Votes	%	Swing	Seats	Change
Liberal	449,036	41.39	+3.24	8	▲1
Labor	402,927	37.14	-0.29	7	Steady
One Nation	67,992	6.27	-3.01		
Greens	64,939	5.99	+0.93		
Democrats	50,581	4.66	+0.70		
Liberals for Forests	13,116	1.21			
Christian Democrats	12,792	1.18			
National	11,052	1.02			
Independent	6,957	0.64			
Citizens Electoral Council	2,907	0.27			
Curtin Labor Alliance	2,496	0.23			
Total	1,084,795			15	▲1
Two-party-preferred vote
Liberal	559,926	51.62	1.08	8	▲1
Labor	524,869	48.38	-1.08	7	Steady

=== South Australia ===
2001 Australian federal election (South Australia)
- 10 November 2001

All 12 South Australian seats in the Australian House of Representatives and 6 seats in the Australian Senate
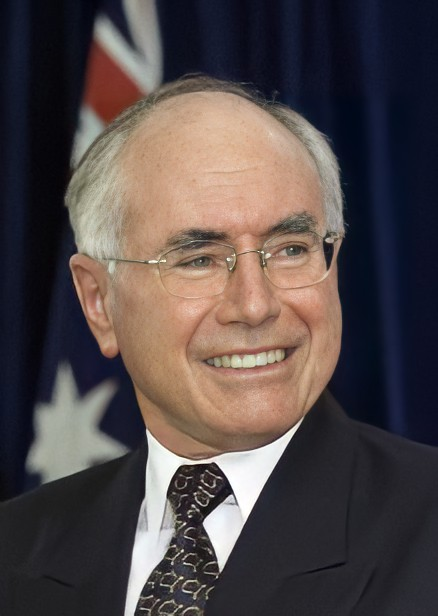

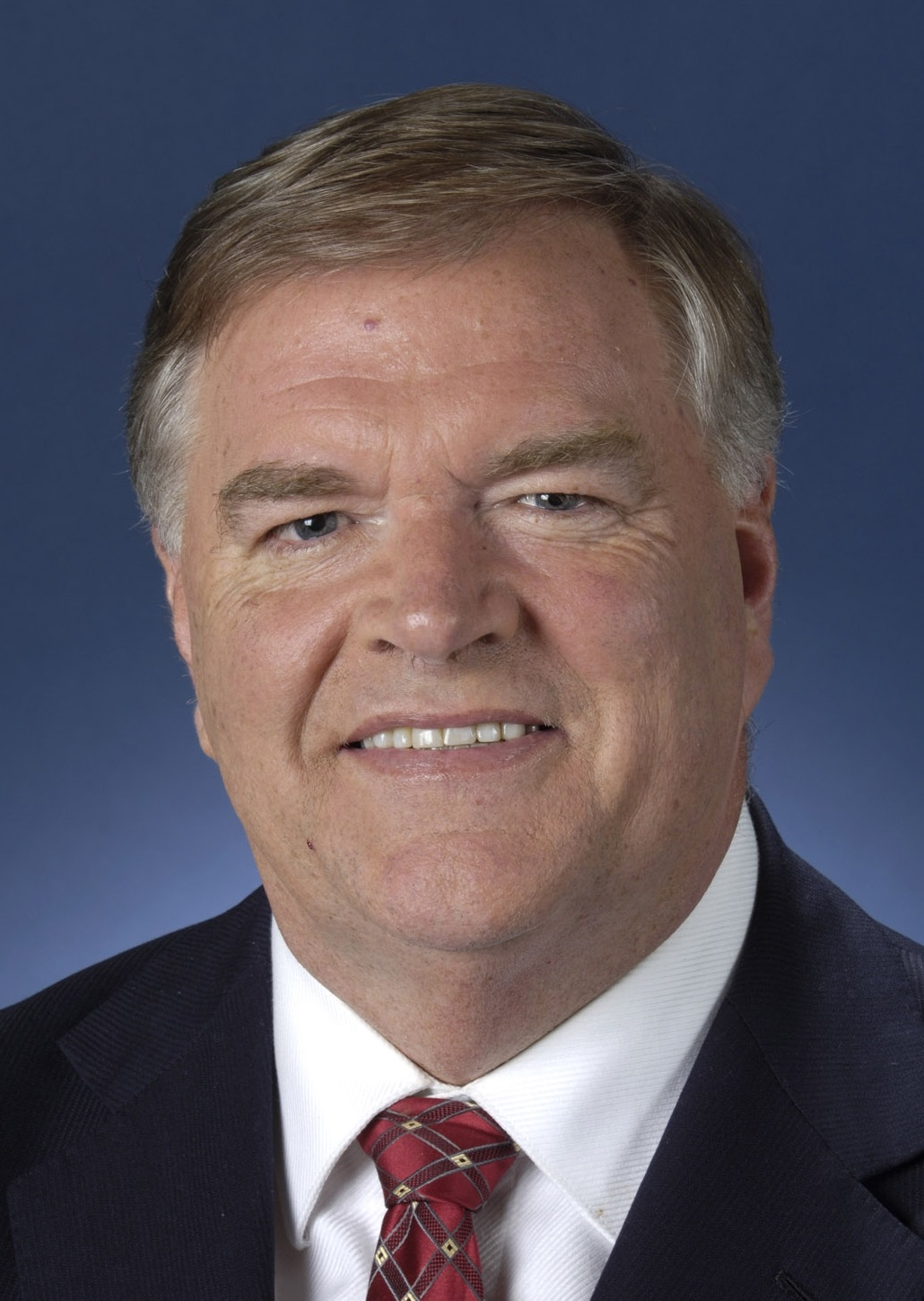
	First party	Second party
Leader	John Howard	Kim Beazley
Party	Liberal/National coalition	Labor
Last election	9 seats	3 seats
Seats won	9 seats	3 seats
Seat change	Steady	Steady
Popular vote	430,442	316,362
Percentage	45.90%	33.75%
Swing	▲3.85	▼0.74
TPP	54.08%	45.92%
TPP swing	▲0.97	▼0.97

Turnout 99.60% (CV) — Informal 3.40%
Party	Votes	%	Swing	Seats	Change
Liberal	430,442	45.90	3.85	9	Steady
Labor	316,362	33.74	-0.74	3	Steady
Democrats	98,849	10.54	0.40		
One Nation	44,574	4.75	-5.05		
Greens	34,141	3.64	3.15		
Independents	7,921	0.80			
No GST	4,202	0.42	+0.42		
Communist	0,672	0.07			
Total	937,708			12	
Two-party-preferred vote
Liberal		45.92	-0.97	9	Steady
Labor		54.08	0.97	3	Steady

=== Tasmania ===
2001 Australian federal election (Tasmania)
- 10 November 2001

All 5 Tasmanian seats in the Australian House of Representatives and 6 seats in the Australian Senate
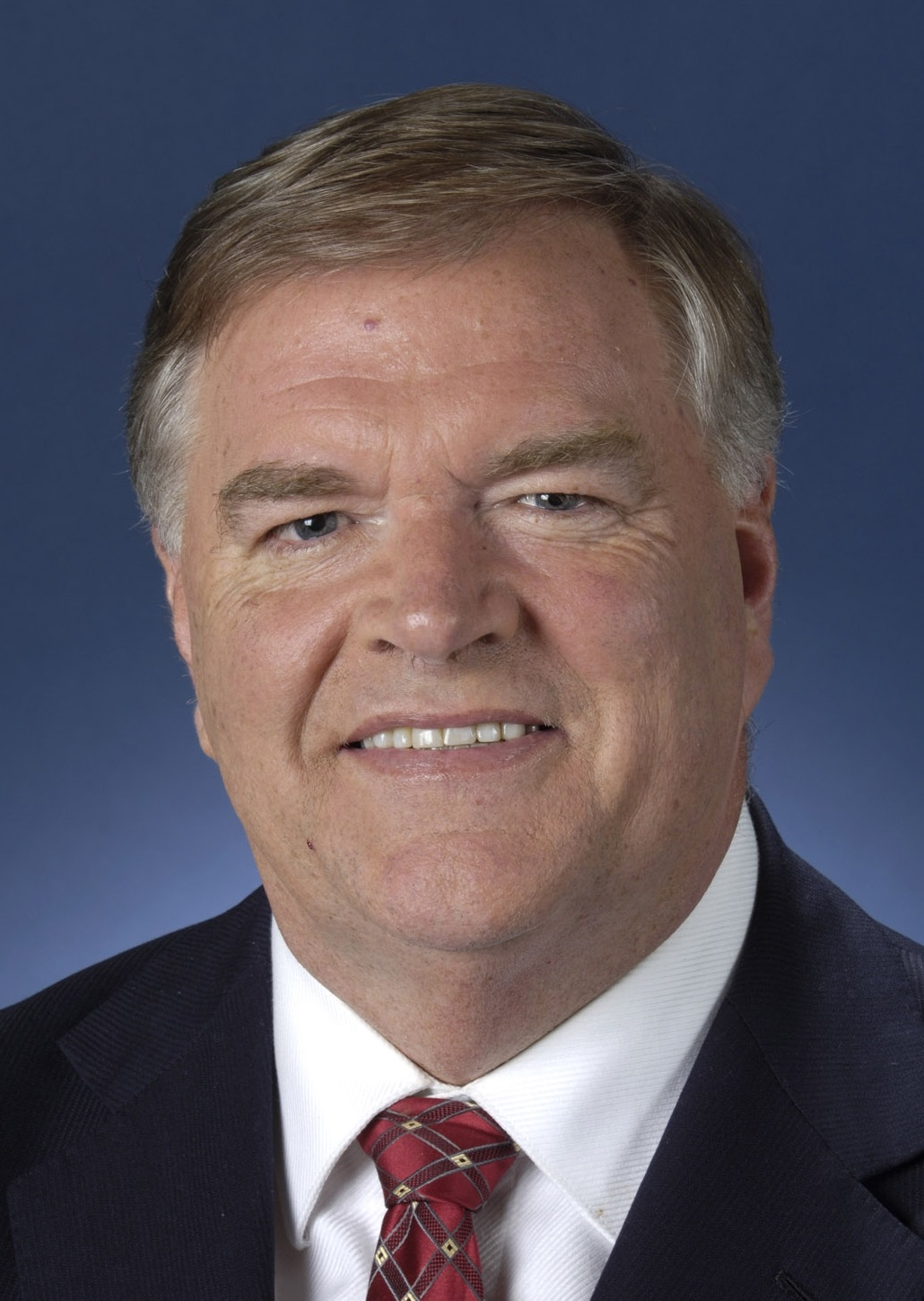

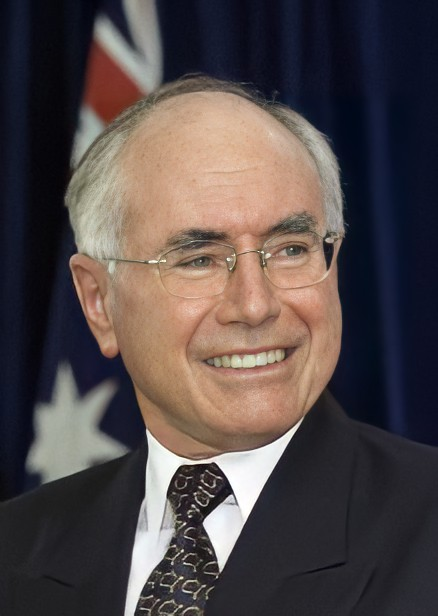
	First party	Second party
Leader	Kim Beazley	John Howard
Party	Labor	Liberal/National coalition
Last election	5 seats	0 seats
Seats won	5 seats	0 seats
Seat change	Steady	Steady
Popular vote	145,305	114,283
Percentage	47.17%	37.10%
Swing	▼1.73	▼1.07
TPP	57.32%	42.68%
TPP swing	▲0.41	▼0.41
- Results by electorate

Turnout 99.60% (CV) — Informal 3.40%
Party	Votes	%	Swing	Seats	Change
Labor	145,305	47.17	–1.73	5	Steady
Liberal	114,283	37.10	–1.07	0	Steady
Greens	24,052	7.81	+2.25		
Democrats	13,785	4.48	+1.22		
One Nation	8,847	2.87	+0.42		
Liberals for Forests	966	1.59	+1.59		
Tasmania First	621	1.02	–0.89		
Citizens Electoral Council	159	0.26	+0.26		
Total	308,018			5	
Two-party-preferred vote
Labor		57.73	+0.41	5	Steady
Liberal		42.27	–0.41	0	Steady

== Territories ==
=== Australian Capital Territory ===
2001 Australian federal election (Australian Capital Territory)
- 10 November 2001

All 2 Australian Capital Territory seats in the Australian House of Representatives and all 2 seats in the Australian Senate
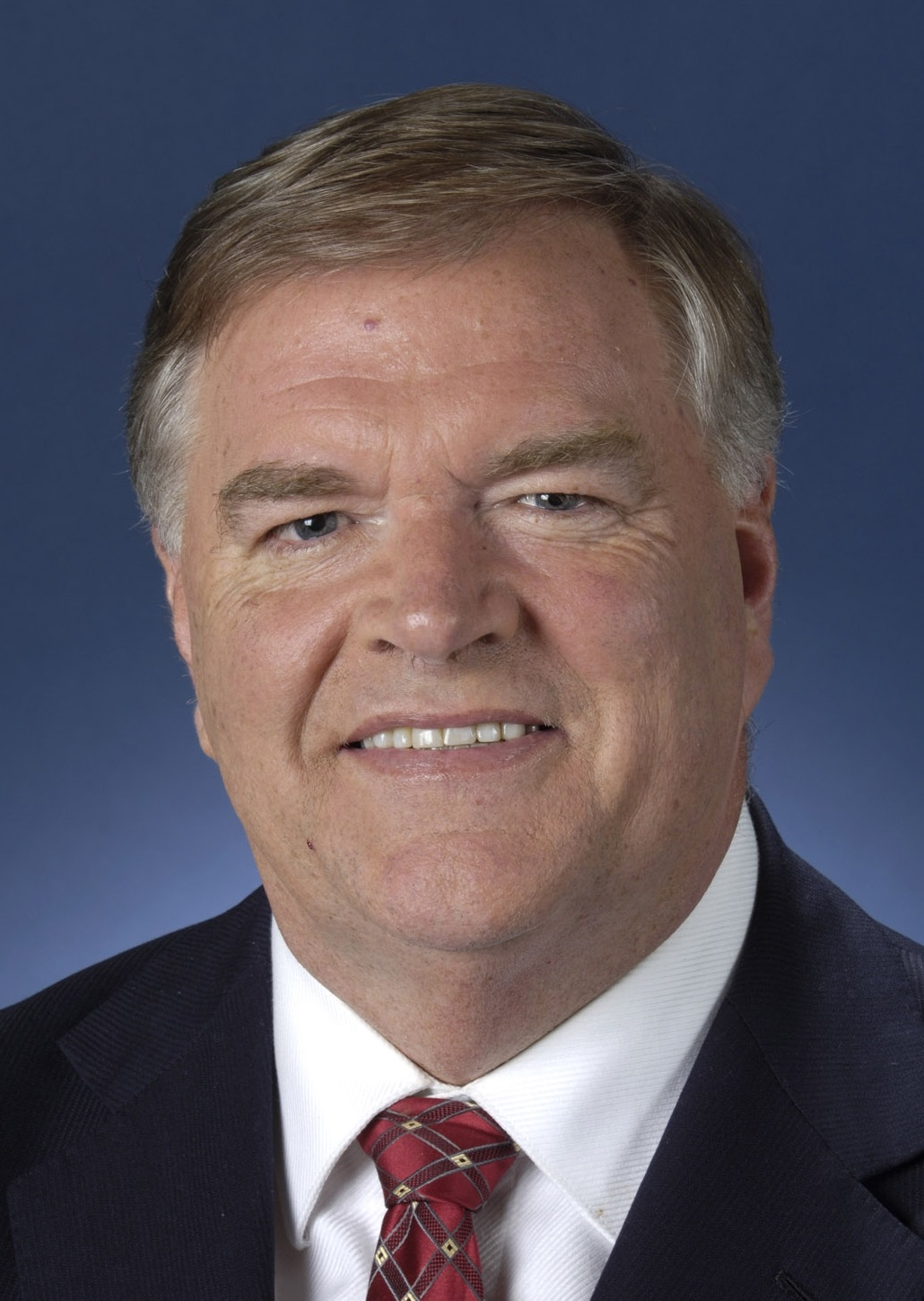

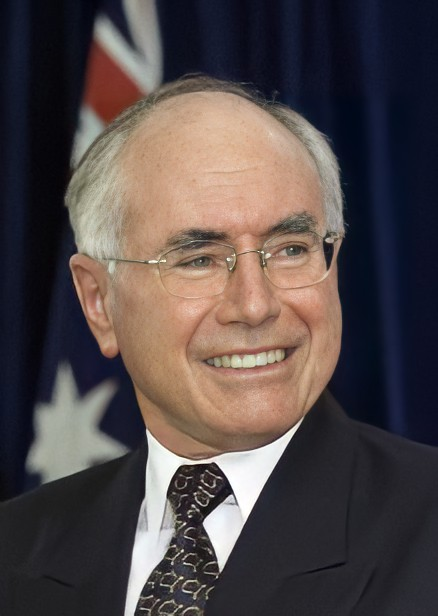
	First party	Second party
Leader	Kim Beazley	John Howard
Party	Labor	Liberal/National coalition
Last election	2 seats	0 seats
Seats won	2	0
Seat change	Steady	Steady
Popular vote	95,215	65,651
Percentage	46.98%	32.39%
Swing	▲3.66	▲1.87
TPP	61.08%	38.93%
TPP swing	▼1.36	▲1.36

Turnout 96.48% (CV) — Informal 3.52%
Party	Votes	%	Swing	Seats	Change
Labor	95,215	46.98	–3.66	2	Steady
Liberal	65,651	32.39	1.87	0	Steady
Democrats	16,266	8.03	0.63		
Greens	14,335	7.07	2.89		
One Nation	5,576	2.75	–2.33		
Christian Democrats	5,623	2.77	0.60		
Total	202,666			2	
Two-party-preferred vote
Labor		61.08	–1.36	2	Steady
Liberal		38.92	1.36	0	Steady

=== Northern Territory ===
2001 Australian federal election (Northern Territory)
- 10 November 2001

All 2 Northern Territory seats in the Australian House of Representatives and all 2 seats in the Australian Senate
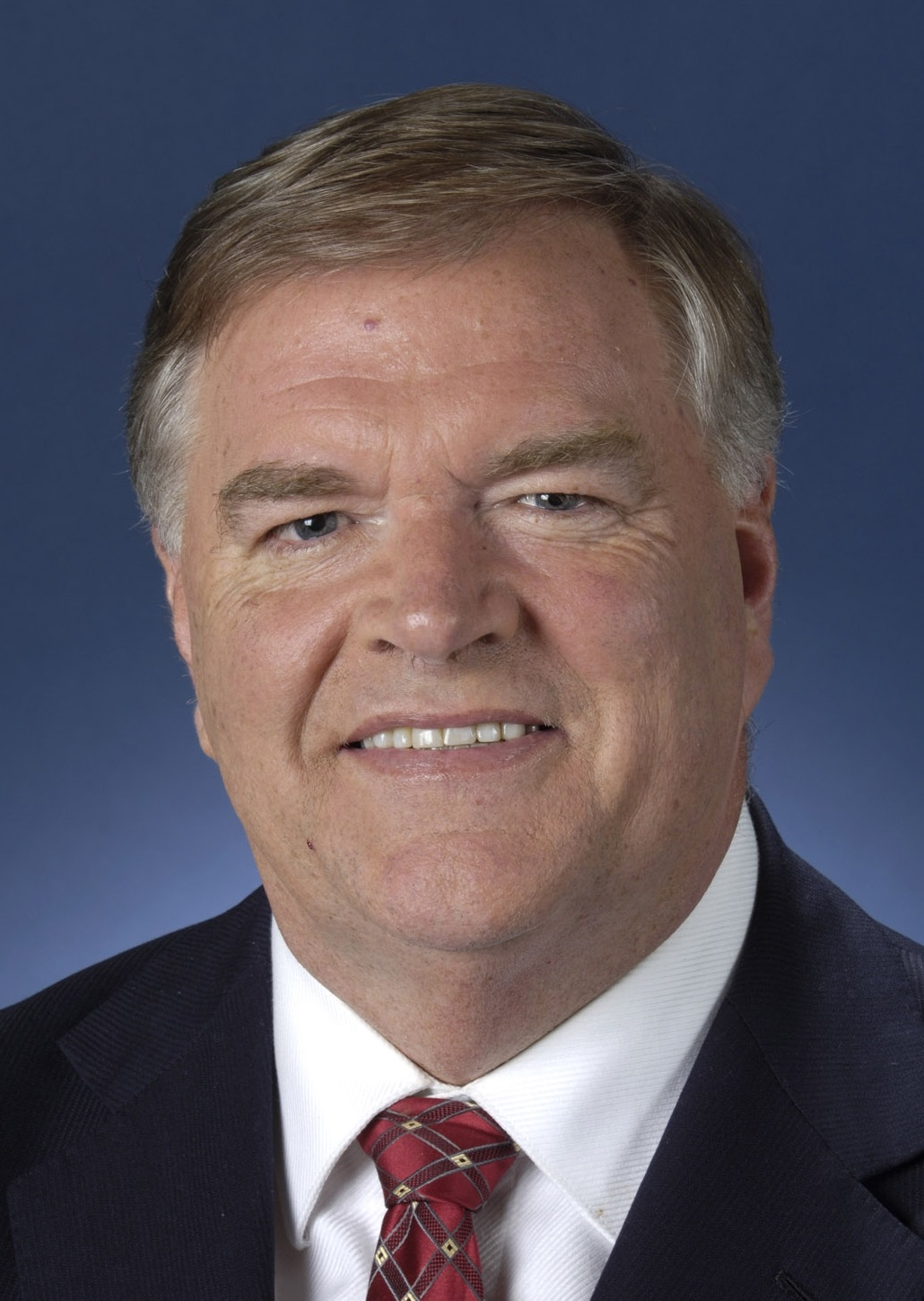

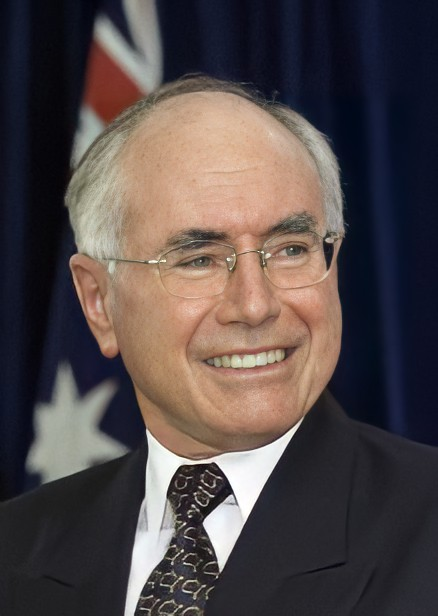
	First party	Second party
Leader	Kim Beazley	John Howard
Party	Labor	Liberal/National coalition
Last election	1 seat	0 seats
Seats won	1	1
Seat change	Steady	▲1
Popular vote	39,111	36,961
Percentage	42.90%	40.54%
Swing	▲0.60	▲0.94
TPP	50.57%	49.43%
TPP swing	▲1.92	▼1.92

Turnout 95.36% (CV) — Informal 4.54%
Party	Votes	%	Swing	Seats	Change
Labor	39,111	42.90	0.60	1	Steady
Country Liberal	36,961	40.54	0.94	1	▲1
Democrats	4,795	5.26	0.14		Steady
Greens	3,665	4.02	0.99		Steady
One Nation	3,486	3.82	-4.31		Steady
Independents	3,143	3.45	2.33		Steady
Total	91,161			2	▲1
Two-party-preferred vote
Labor		52.49	1.92	1	Steady
Country Liberal		47.51	–1.92	1	▲1
