= Hugh Leslie =

Australian politician (1900–1974)

Hugh Leslie OBE
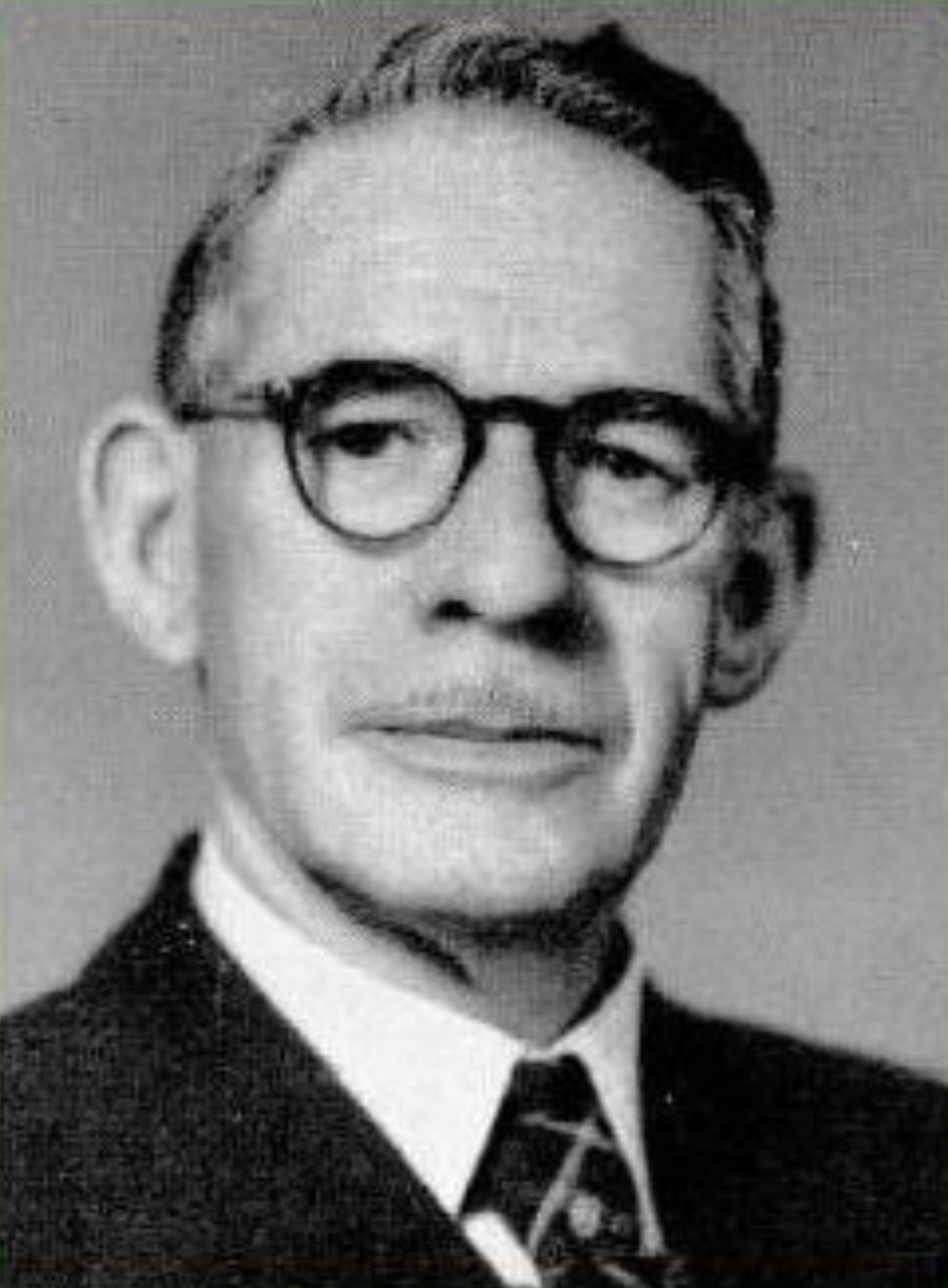

Member of the Australian Parliament for Moore
- In office 10 December 1949 – 22 November 1958
- Preceded by: New seat
- Succeeded by: Vic Halbert
- In office 9 December 1961 – 1 November 1963
- Preceded by: Vic Halbert
- Succeeded by: Don Maisey

Personal details
- Born: 17 April 1900 Durban, South Africa
- Died: 2 September 1974 (aged 74) Nedlands, Western Australia
- Party: Australian Country Party
- Spouse: Isabel Margaret Dawson
- Occupation: Newspaper editor

Hugh Alan Leslie OBE (17 April 1900 – 2 September 1974) was an Australian politician. He was a member of the Country Party and served terms in the Western Australian Legislative Assembly (1943–1949) and House of Representatives (1949–1958, 1961–1963). He was a newspaper editor before entering politics.

== Early life ==
Leslie was born in Durban, South Africa on 17 April 1900 to Charles Leslie and Helen Gibson. His parents died when Hugh was very young and he was raised in a facility, educated at King William's Town and Grahamstown College, at Grahamstown. Leslie served in the South African armed forces from 1916 to 1919 and worked in small jobs until emigrating to Victoria, Australia in 1923 and arriving in Western Australia in 1927. Leslie became very active in Country Party affairs and became Wyalkatchem's branch secretary in 1928. On 26 December 1931 Leslie married Isabel Margaret Dawson (aged 21), eventually bearing seven children. The North-Eastern Wheatbelt Tribune acquired Leslie as its editor in that same year and he went on to become its proprietor.

== State politics ==
Leslie exited the print media in 1939 and became chairman of the Wyalkatchem District Patriotic Committee and the president of the local Returned Sailors' and Soldiers' Imperial League of Australia. He joined the army in 1940, stationed in the Middle East. Leslie's right leg was amputated in 1941 following an injury in Libya and was discharged from the army in 1943. He was elected to the Western Australian Legislative Assembly on 20 November of that year in the seat of Mount Marshall. He served as the party whip and party secretary until his resignation from State parliament on 30 October 1949.

== Federal politics ==
Leslie won the Division of Moore on 10 December 1949 and continued a successful political career, including a six-year stint with the Public Accounts Committee from 1952 to 1958. He lost his seat in 1958, and regained it in 1961. Leslie resigned from his position in 1963 due to his wife's ill health. After the 1964 Senate elections he was suspended from the Country Party for five months for allowing how-to-vote cards similar to the Liberal Party's to be distributed. In 1967 Leslie was appointed Order of the British Empire (OBE).

Leslie died on 2 September 1974 in Repatriation General Hospital in Nedlands, Perth.

Western Australian Legislative Assembly
Preceded by Frederick Warner	Member for Mount Marshall; 1943 – 1949	Succeeded by George Cornell
Parliament of Australia
New division	Member for Moore; 1949–1958	Succeeded by Vic Halbert
Preceded by Vic Halbert	Member for Moore; 1961–1963	Succeeded by Don Maisey
