= Ian Goodenough =

Australian politician (born 1975)

Ian Goodenough JP
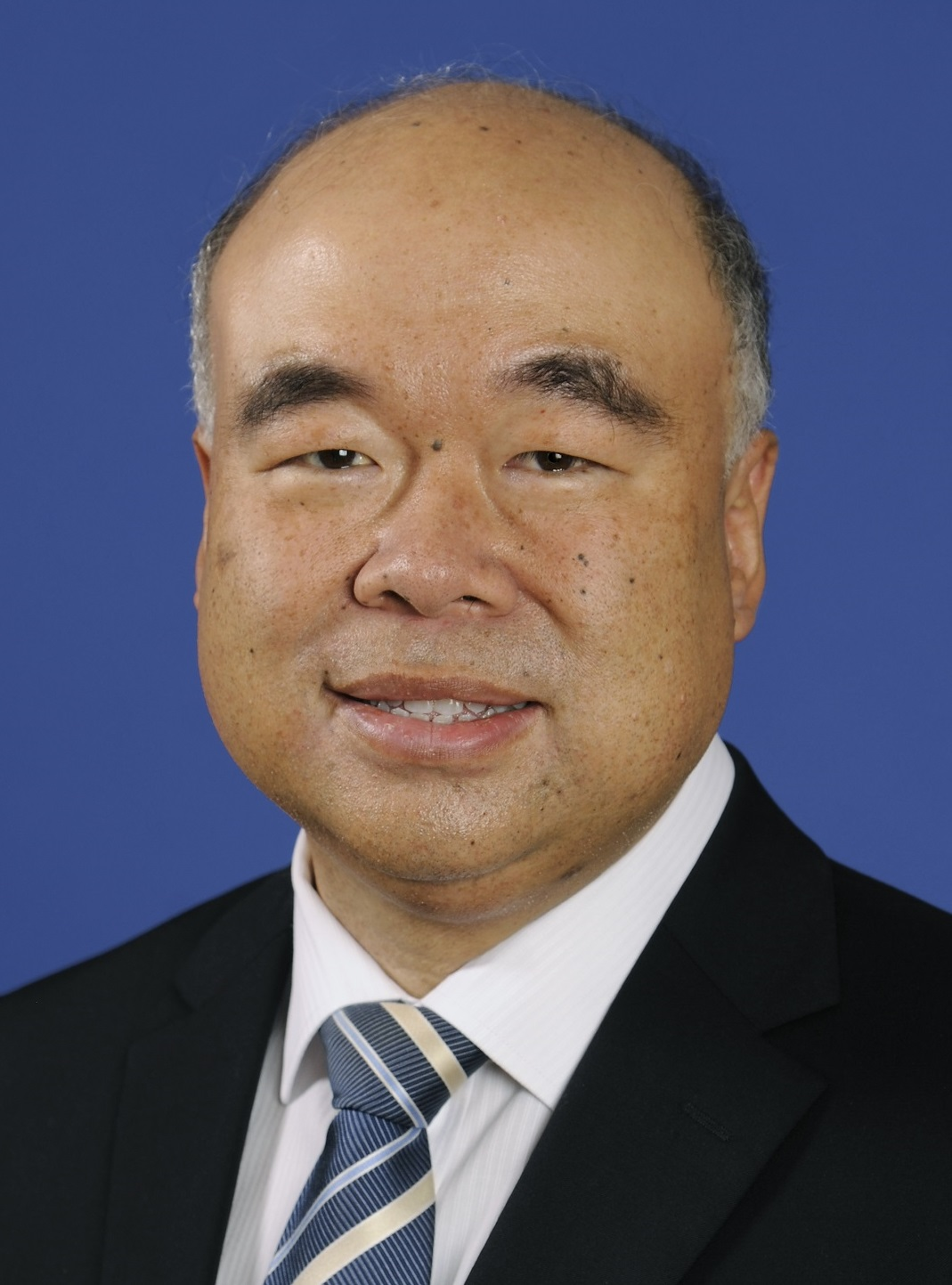
- Official portrait, 2016

5th Second Deputy Speaker of the Australian House of Representatives
- In office 26 July 2022 – 31 March 2025
- Speaker: Milton Dick
- Preceded by: Rob Mitchell
- Succeeded by: Terry Young

Member of the Australian Parliament for Moore
- In office 7 September 2013 – 3 May 2025
- Preceded by: Mal Washer
- Succeeded by: Tom French

Personal details
- Born: Ian Reginald Goodenough; 3 July 1975 (age 51) Singapore
- Citizenship: Australian; Singapore (1975–2004)
- Party: Independent (from 2024)
- Other political affiliations: Liberal (until 2024)
- Education: Aranmore Catholic College
- Alma mater: Curtin University (BCom, MBA)
- Occupation: Politician; property developer; businessman
- Awards: Centenary Medal (2001)

Ian Reginald Goodenough (born 3 July 1975) is an Australian former politician. He was a member of the House of Representatives from September 2013 to May 2025, representing the Western Australian seat of Moore. He was a member of the Liberal Party, when he resigned to recontest Moore as an independent following his defeat for Liberal preselection. He was a property developer, businessman and City of Wanneroo councillor prior to his election to parliament.

== Early life and education ==
Goodenough was born in the Bedok suburb of Singapore in 1975. His family emigrated to Australia in December 1984, before becoming an Australian citizen in 1987. He is of English, Portuguese, and Singaporean Chinese descent, and identifies as a member of the Eurasian community, with his branch of the Goodenough family having first arrived in Singapore in the 1800s. A direct ancestor, Samuel Goodenough, was Bishop of Carlisle in the early 19th century, and a great-granduncle, Sir William Goodenough, was an admiral in the Royal Navy.

After moving to Australia, Goodenough attended Leederville Primary School and Aranmore Catholic College. He graduated as the dux of his high school in 1992, and then began work for an accounting firm, Hendry Rae & Court. At the same time, he attended night classes at Curtin University, eventually receiving a Bachelor of Commerce (BComm) degree in 1998. In 2003, Goodenough returned to Curtin for two years to obtain a Master of Business Administration (MBA) degree, and later also attended an executive development program (EDP) at the University of Pennsylvania's Wharton School in Philadelphia, United States.

== Career ==
Aged 21, Goodenough invested money borrowed from his parents into Pipe Supports Australia, a pipe manufacturing and wholesale business, and in 1998 he co-founded Westcapital Group, a property developer. He was managing director of both companies, and in 2006 was named in Business News' 40 Under 40, with his profile noting his "diverse business interests". Until resigning in February 2011, he additionally served as managing director of several companies in the Claymont Group, on his resignation exchanging his shares in the companies for land worth $9.7 million. From 1997 to 2001, during the Court–Cowan government, Goodenough worked part-time as a research officer in WA's Department of the Premier and Cabinet, assisting, amongst others, George Cash (the President of the Legislative Council), and Ian Osborne (the government whip). He was a recipient of the Australian government's Centenary Medal in 2001, for "service to the community through local government, education and charity".

== Politics ==
=== Local government ===
Goodenough was an unsuccessful candidate for the Town of Vincent's Mount Hawthorn Ward in December 1997, placing third of three candidates with 19.40% of the vote. In 1999, after the City of Joondalup's separation from the City of Wanneroo necessitated new elections for both councils, Goodenough was elected to the City of Wanneroo's Coastal Ward. He remained a councillor until his election to federal parliament in September 2013.

=== Federal politics ===
A "longstanding member of the Liberal Party", Goodenough was president of the party's branch in the Division of Moore from 2007 to 2011, replacing Michaelia Cash following her election to the Senate at the 2007 federal election. He was preselected for Moore in July 2012, and won the seat at the 2013 federal election with 53.08 percent on first preferences (and 61.86 percent of the 2PP vote), replacing the retiring Mal Washer. Goodenough has been described as a member of the conservative faction of the Liberal Party, in particular, belonging to the "National Right" faction, headed by Peter Dutton. Goodenough sat on the Standing Committees for Procedure and Tax and Revenue, and on the Joint Standing Committee for Electoral Matters. He also sat on the Speaker's Panel, whose members chair the house in the absence of both the Speaker and Deputy Speakers.

Goodenough was re-elected as the member for Moore at the 2022 federal election, but suffered a –11.0% swing in the two-party preferred vote. He finished with 50.7% of the two-party preferred vote, compared to Labor candidate Tom French on 49.3%. Moore then became Western Australia's most marginal Liberal-held seat.

In February 2024, Goodenough lost a preselection vote for his seat. Vince Connelly succeeded him as the Liberal candidate for Moore ahead of the 2025 election. He had been supported by Dutton, Sussan Ley, and Angus Taylor. Goodenough was defeated by the ALP's Tom French at the 2025 election.

=== Political positions ===
During the Morrison government, Goodenough was a member of the National Right faction of the Liberal Party.

In 2018, Goodenough supported Peter Dutton's call to treat white South African farmers, who are sometimes targets of attacks, as refugees.

Goodenough is an opponent of same-sex marriage. In 2016, he wrote an article for Yahoo!, which was also published in The West Australian newspaper, entitled, "The complexities of gay marriage are too risky", in which he claimed that legalising same-sex marriage would create, "an enormous cost to society in terms of dealing with social dysfunction, psychological and mental health issues", implying that children raised by same-sex couples would suffer mental illness. Notably, such claims have been thoroughly disputed by the Australian Psychological Society. Additionally, Goodenough also mentioned civil unions, which were already legal, implying that legalising same-sex marriage was redundant, saying: "The proponents of same-sex marriage are yet to provide a compelling argument as to why civil unions are inadequate in protecting their legal rights."

In Parliament, Labor member Terri Butler responded to Goodenough's comments, stating, "I do think we may have found an explanation for [Goodenough's] bachelor status, given his description of marriage being not romantic, but a social construct important for progeny. If I was to counsel the member for Moore in his quest for love, I would say, maybe don’t roll that one out on the first date." Goodenough's voting record also indicates that he believes civil celebrants should be allowed to refuse to marry same-sex couples. Goodenough falsely claimed that Anglicare would face federal funding cuts if same-sex marriage was legalised – a claim that was dismissed by Anglicare WA's chief executive officer, Ian Carter. Goodenough's electorate of Moore voted 68% in favour of same-sex marriage during the Australian Marriage Law Postal Survey.

In October 2017, it was reported in The West Australian that a Year 12 student from Duncraig Senior High School, Grace Gouldstone, had refused to accept an award sponsored by Goodenough due to his beliefs over same-sex marriage. She wrote, "I feel strongly that the sponsor of the award... does not support the values of that particular award and does not reflect the values of our school as a positive and inclusive environment... As such, I reject his award." The event received significant national media coverage, including on The Project.

=== Controversy ===
In February 2016, former Liberal MP for the Western Australian state electorate of Hillarys, Rob Johnson claimed that Goodenough had encouraged members of non-mainstream, evangelical Christian church groups to "takeover" branches within the electorate of Moore, including the Globalheart Church in Joondalup, of which Goodenough is a member. Johnson argued that "religious cults" were "bombing [his] branches", alleging that Goodenough had "signed up people from a religious sect in Quinns Rock and stuck them in [his] Padbury branch which is about 25 miles away." Johnson also alleged that Goodenough had set up "employment bureaus" to find job positions for members of the Globalheart Church in his electorate office. Goodenough refused to respond to the comments, stating only that it was "not appropriate for a Member of Parliament to comment about the personal affairs of his staff, such as religion."

In 2019, claims emerged that Goodenough had "[taken] a group of overseas visitors to local businesses while being the director of a company that is paid for striking export deals". Goodenough denied the conflict of interest claims and blamed them on "tall poppy syndrome". Goodenough also admitted that he "spoke briefly" with self-proclaimed neo-Nazi Neil Erikson in 2018.

=== Post-parliamentary career ===
In July 2025, Goodenough announced his intention to contest the position of Mayor of the City of Joondalup at the upcoming local government elections. He lost to candidate Daniel Kingston, who was sworn in on October 22.

== Personal life ==
Goodenough has been living with chronic kidney disease (CKD) since he was in his early 20s, and requires multiple rounds of kidney dialysis each week.

Parliament of Australia
Preceded by Mal Washer	Member for Moore; 2013–2025	Succeeded by Tom French
