= Don Maisey =

Australian politician

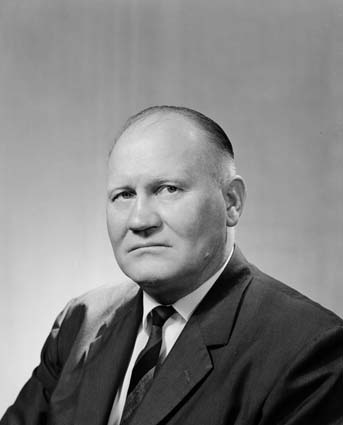

Member of the Australian Parliament for Moore
- In office 30 November 1963 – 18 May 1974
- Preceded by: Hugh Leslie
- Succeeded by: John Hyde

Personal details
- Born: 6 May 1915 Goomalling, Western Australia
- Died: 20 April 2005 (aged 89)
- Party: Country
- Spouse: Dorrie Wiltshire (m. 1935; div. 1970)
- Education: Wesley College, Perth
- Occupation: Farmer

Donald William Maisey (6 May 1915 – 20 April 2005) was an Australian wheat farmer and politician. He was a member of the Country Party and served in the House of Representatives from 1963 to 1974, representing the Western Australian seat of Moore.

== Early life ==
Maisey was born on 6 May 1915 in Goomalling, Western Australia. He was the son of Albert Maisey, a farmer from Dowerin who served as chairman of the Dowerin Road Board.

Maisey began his education at Dowerin State School and later boarded at Wesley College, Perth. After leaving school he returned to the family property at Dowerin. He was active in the Wheatgrowers' Union and the Primary Producers' Association, which later merged to form the Farmers' Union of Western Australia. He was elected vice-president of the wheat section of the Farmers' Union in 1950, becoming president of the wheat section the following year. He also served as a general vice-president and as a director of the union's newspaper, the Farmers' Weekly.

In 1953, Maisey was elected as a growers' representative on the Australian Wheat Board (AWB), serving from 1954 to 1963. He was also a Western Australian representative on the Australian Wheatgrowers' Federation and served as national president in 1954 and 1959. He played a significant role in the establishment of the Commonwealth Wheat Research Council and successfully negotiated with the state government to establish a fund for research on soil fertility. He was an advocate for increased sales of Australian wheat to Asian markets and in 1961 participated in an AWB trade mission to China which secured a significant contract.

== Politics ==
In October 1963, Maisey won Country Party preselection for the House of Representatives seat of Moore. He retained Moore for the Country Party at the 1963 federal election, following the retirement of the incumbent MP Hugh Leslie. He was re-elected in 1966 despite the Liberal Party targeting the seat.

Maisey was a prominent opponent of the Gorton government's tariff policies, along with Bert Kelly, and in 1969 published How Tariffs Hit the West, a short pamphlet arguing that "tariffs discriminated heavily against Western Australia and that protected goods produced in the eastern states were being dumped in Western Australia to the cost of local manufacturers". His views brought him into conflict with protectionist Country Party leader John McEwen in 1969, who he publicly criticised over tariff policies and support of wheat quotas. He further accused McEwen of failing to protect the interests of wheatgrowers in the International Grains Agreement negotiations over the international minimum price for wheat. Athol Thomas of The Canberra Times observed that Maisey was "recognised by West Australians as their most outspoken federal representative", while Don Whitington stated that it had been "a long time since a member of the Country Party attacked his own leader as trenchantly".

Maisey lost his seat to the Liberal candidate John Hyde at the 1974 election. He remained involved in politics and in 1975 unsuccessfully sought an injunction against Country Party state MPs in the Supreme Court of Western Australia, who had sought to re-enter a coalition with the state Liberal Party in defiance of the Country Party organisation.

== Personal life ==
Maisey married Dorrie Wiltshire in 1935. They were divorced in 1970.

Maisey died on 20 April 2005, aged 89.

Parliament of Australia
Preceded by Hugh Leslie	Member for Moore; 1963–1974	Succeeded by John Hyde
