= Mal Washer =

Australian politician

Dr Mal Washer

Member of the Australian Parliament for Moore
- In office 3 October 1998 – 5 August 2013
- Preceded by: Paul Filing
- Succeeded by: Ian Goodenough

Personal details
- Born: 12 August 1945 (age 81) Bunbury, Western Australia
- Party: Liberal Party of Australia
- Education: University of Western Australia
- Occupation: General practitioner, politician

Malcolm James "Mal" Washer (born 12 August 1945) is a former Australian politician. He was the Liberal member of the Australian House of Representatives for the Division of Moore in Western Australia from 1998 to 2013.

== Early life and medical career ==
Washer was born in Bunbury, Western Australia. He graduated from the University of Western Australia in 1970 with degrees in medicine and surgery. He worked as a general practitioner in the northern suburbs of Perth for more than 25 years before entering federal politics.

== Parliamentary career ==
Washer was elected at the 1998 federal election, defeating the sitting member Paul Filing. He was re-elected in 2001, 2004, 2007 and 2010.

He was considered a moderate Liberal in a very conservative state and is supportive of socially liberal issues such as same-sex marriage. During 2010 and 2011 he was the contact for the Australian Parliamentary Group on Drug Law Reform (APGDLR), a cross party group of 100 MPs from Australian State and Commonwealth parliaments. The group was set up in 1993 after a meeting in Canberra convened by Michael Moore (ACT Assembly) and Ann Symonds (MLC, NSW). In August 2011, he announced he would not be contesting the next federal election.

In his valedictory speech in June 2013, Washer reflected on 15 years in parliament and called for greater emphasis on evidence-based policy, particularly in health and social issues.

== Post-parliamentary activities ==
After leaving politics, Washer became involved in the emerging medicinal cannabis industry. He served as chairman of ASX-listed company AusCann, which focuses on the development and manufacture of cannabinoid medicines. He has been a prominent advocate for evidence-based drug policy reform.

In March 2014, Washer announced his resignation as chair of the Alcohol and Other Drug Council of Australia. He said the reason was the "ill-informed" decision of Assistant Health Minister Fiona Nash to cut the organisation's funding without notice, noting that her decision was "a bloody tragedy" which "wasn't subject to any review ... it was dumb advising dumber, and dumb won."

As at January 2018, Washer was chair of ASX-listed AusCann, a medical cannabis company.

Parliament of Australia
Preceded by Paul Filing	Member for Moore; 1998–2013	Succeeded by Ian Goodenough
