= Division of Moore =

Australian federal electoral division

Coordinates: 31.739°S 115.758°E

Moore Australian House of Representatives Division
- Interactive map of electorate boundaries from the 2025 federal election
- Created: 1949
- MP: Tom French
- Party: Labor
- Namesake: George Fletcher Moore
- Electors: 119,412 (2022)
- Area: 90 km^{2} (34.7 sq mi)
- Demographic: Outer metropolitan
Electorates around Moore:
Indian Ocean	Pearce	Pearce
Indian Ocean	Moore	Cowan
Indian Ocean	Curtin	Cowan

The Division of Moore is an Australian electoral division in the state of Western Australia.

== History ==
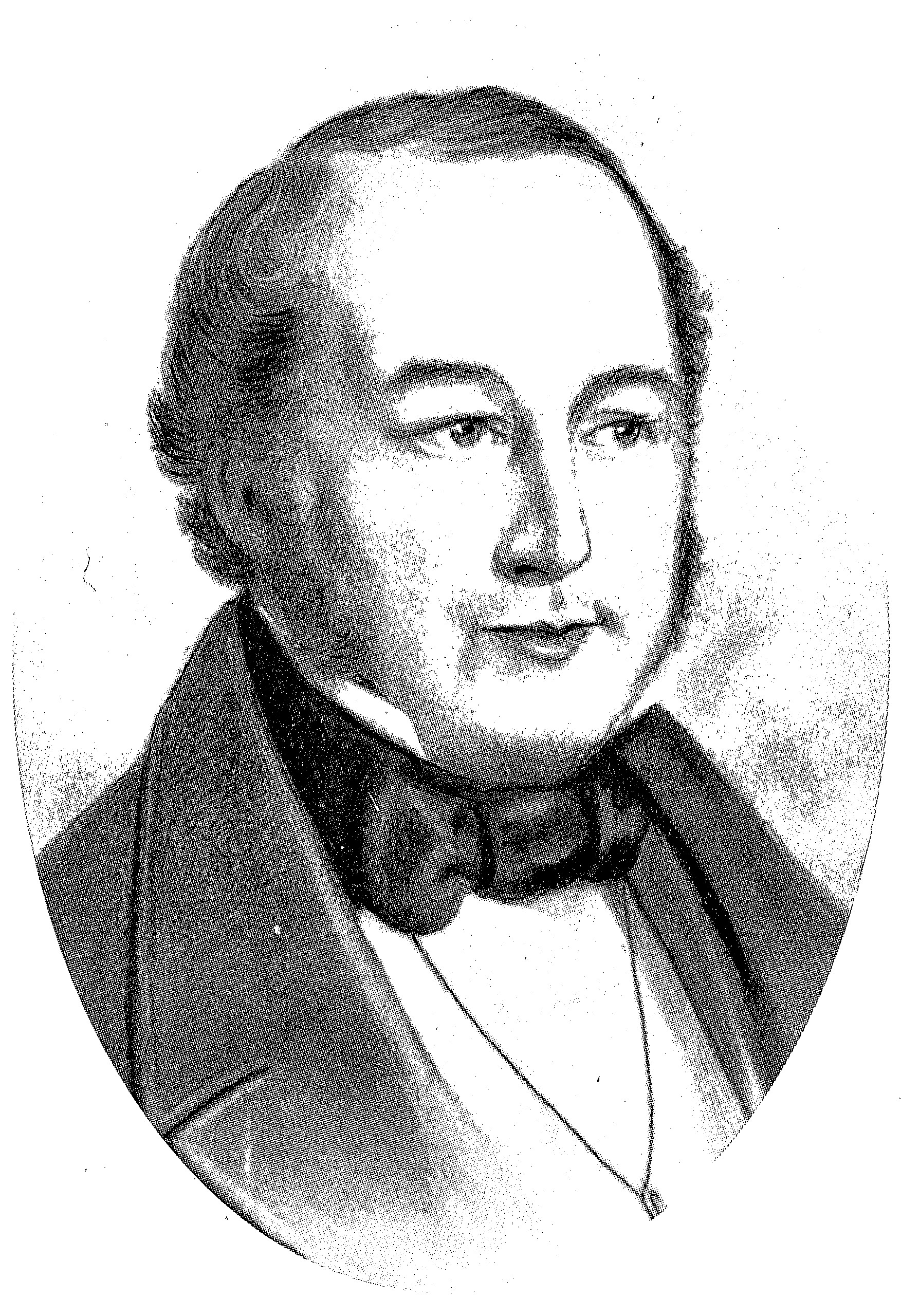
George Fletcher Moore, the division's namesake

The Division was named after George Fletcher Moore, the first Advocate-General of Western Australia, and is at present a newly-reelected Labor seat held by Tom French since the 2025 federal election, having changed significantly throughout its history in both geographical area and in political character.

Due to significant demographic change, the seat's boundaries and constituency has evolved considerably since it was proclaimed at the 11 May 1949 redistribution. At that time, it was basically a rural electorate, which included parts of the Wheatbelt along the Indian Ocean coast to the north and east of Perth, the state capital — a similar region to that covered by the former state seat of Moore. At the 1949 election, it was won by the Country Party. The seat maintained its rural character over the years. However, growth in Perth's northern suburbs of Perth from the 1960s onwards eventually pushed its southern boundary inside the urban fringe.

The 28 February 1980 redistribution moved much of the electorate's rural hinterland into the new seat of O'Connor, and the creation of Cowan four years later, in the suburbs north of Reid Highway to Whitfords Avenue, transformed Moore into a safe Labor seat, with a population centred on Midland, but still including the shires of Chittering, Gingin and Dandaragan to the north.

The creation of Pearce at the 31 March 1989 redistribution pushed Moore into the now heavily urban and relatively affluent coastal areas north of the Reid Highway, removing areas like Midland and Beechboro completely, and making it a notionally Liberal seat. The Liberals won it at the 1990 election and held it for 35 years, apart from the period between the 1996 and 1998 federal elections, when sitting member Paul Filing lost Liberal preselection and was reelected as an independent. Mal Washer regained the seat for the Liberals at the 1998 election.

== Geography ==
Since 1984, federal electoral division boundaries in Australia have been determined at redistributions by a redistribution committee appointed by the Australian Electoral Commission. Redistributions occur for the boundaries of divisions in a particular state, and they occur every seven years, or sooner if a state's representation entitlement changes or when divisions of a state are malapportioned.

In August 2021, the Australian Electoral Commission (AEC) announced that Moore would gain the suburbs of Carine, North Beach and Watermans Bay, along with parts of Gwelup, Karrinyup and Trigg, from the abolished seat of Stirling, along with the remainder of Kingsley from the seat of Cowan. These boundary changes took place at the 2022 election.

The seat presently contains the vast majority of the City of Joondalup, in the northwest metropolitan area of Perth. Suburbs presently included are:

- Beldon
- Burns Beach
- Carine
- Connolly
- Craigie
- Currambine
- Duncraig
- Edgewater
- Heathridge
- Hillarys
- Gwelup (part)
- Iluka
- Joondalup
- Kallaroo
- Karrinyup (part)
- Kingsley
- Kinross
- Marmion
- Mullaloo
- North Beach
- Ocean Reef
- Padbury
- Sorrento
- Trigg (part)
- Watermans Bay
- Woodvale

== Members ==
Image	Member	Party	Term	Notes
	Hugh Leslie (1900–1974)	Country	10 December 1949 – 22 November 1958	Previously held the Western Australian Legislative Assembly seat of Mount Marshall.
	Vic Halbert (1910–1997)	Liberal	22 November 1958 – 9 December 1961	Lost seat
	Hugh Leslie (1900–1974)	Country	9 December 1961 – 1 November 1963	Retired
	Don Maisey (1915–2005)	Country	30 November 1963 – 18 May 1974	Lost seat
	John Hyde (1936–)	Liberal	18 May 1974 – 5 March 1983	Lost seat
	Allen Blanchard (1929–2008)	Labor	5 March 1983 – 24 March 1990	Lost seat
	Paul Filing (1955–)	Liberal	24 March 1990 – 18 June 1995	Lost seat
	Paul Filing (1955–)	Independent	18 June 1995 – 3 October 1998	Lost seat
	Mal Washer (1945–)	Liberal	3 October 1998 – 5 August 2013	Retired
	Ian Goodenough (1975–)	Liberal	7 September 2013 – 31 December 2024	Lost preselection and then lost seat
	Ian Goodenough (1975–)	Independent	1 January 2025 – 3 May 2025	Lost preselection and then lost seat
	Tom French (1983–)	Labor	3 May 2025 – present	Incumbent

== Election results ==
2025 Australian federal election: Moore
Party	Candidate	Votes	%	±%
Labor	Tom French	34,734	32.51	+0.62
Liberal	Vince Connelly	33,595	31.45	−10.36
Greens	Scott McCarthy	11,877	11.12	−2.99
Independent	Ian Goodenough	10,623	9.94	+9.94
Independent	Nathan Barton	6,762	6.33	+6.33
One Nation	Paul Fimognari	4,840	4.53	+1.26
Christians	Trevor Bartley	2,347	2.20	+2.20
Trumpet of Patriots	Christopher Rennick	2,059	1.93	+1.16
Total formal votes		106,837	95.22	−0.64
Informal votes		5,367	4.78	+0.64
Turnout		112,204	92.15	+1.26
Two-party-preferred result
Labor	Tom French	56,502	52.89	+3.80
Liberal	Vince Connelly	50,335	47.11	−3.80
Labor gain from Liberal		Swing	+3.80	
