= Electoral district of Butler =

Butler Western Australia—Legislative Assembly
- Interactive map of electoral district boundaries from the 2025 state election
- State: Western Australia
- Dates current: 2013–present
- MP: Lorna Clarke
- Party: Labor
- Namesake: Butler
- Electors: 35,677 (2025)
- Area: 156 km^{2} (60.2 sq mi)
- Demographic: Metropolitan
- Coordinates: 31.58°S 115.66°E
Electorates around Butler:
Indian Ocean	Mid-West	Mid-West
Indian Ocean	Butler	Wanneroo
Indian Ocean	Mindarie	Wanneroo

Butler is a Legislative Assembly electorate in the state of Western Australia. The district is named for the outer northern Perth suburb of Butler, which falls within its borders.

== Geography ==
Coming into effect after the 2013 election, the boundaries of Butler stretch from the coastal boundary of the City of Wanneroo to its northern and eastern limits, and comprised 546 km² of land otherwise bounded in the south by the Kinross east-west boundary fence, Burns Beach Road, Wanneroo Road, Flynn Drive, Old Yanchep Road and Neaves Road. Its boundaries included the outposts of Yanchep and Two Rocks, the populated suburbs of Butler, Jindalee, Clarkson, Merriwa and Ridgewood, the semi-rural localities of Carabooda, Neerabup, Nowergup, the growing locality of Alkimos and the largely unpopulated localities of Eglinton and Pinjar.

After the 2019 redistribution, the electoral district now consists of the following areas of Two Rocks, Yanchep, Eglinton, Alkimos, Butler, Jindalee, Merriwa, Ridgewood and Nowergup with the boundaries of Butler stretching from the western coastal boundary of the City of Wanneroo to its northern limits of Two Rocks and bounded in the south by Hester Avenue and Wanneroo Road in the east.

== History ==
Butler was created at the 2011 redistribution for the 2013 state election, essentially as Mindarie renamed; the locality of Mindarie was moved from the electorate and into the neighbouring district of Ocean Reef. The inclusion of the locality Banksia Grove accounting for continued population growth of the northern corridor in the Perth metropolitan area.

The district boundaries were redistributed in 2019 and saw the suburb of Quinns Rock being removed from the electoral district.

== Members for Butler ==
Member	Party	Term
John Quigley	Labor	2013–2025
Lorna Clarke	Labor	2025–present

== Election results ==
2025 Western Australian state election: Butler
Party	Candidate	Votes	%	±%
Labor	Lorna Clarke	12,605	47.2	−30.0
Liberal	Rikki Baulch	6,007	22.5	+8.9
Greens	Matthew Price	2,851	10.7	+6.6
One Nation	Mark Powley	2,088	7.8	+7.8
Legalise Cannabis	Ramon Granados	2,025	7.6	+7.6
Christians	Vanessa Montgomery	1,151	4.3	+2.2
Total formal votes		26,727	94.8	−1.5
Informal votes		1,470	5.2	+1.5
Turnout		28,197	79.0	+7.0
Two-party-preferred result
Labor	Lorna Clarke	17,276	64.7	−17.9
Liberal	Rikki Baulch	9,433	35.3	+17.9
Labor hold		Swing	−17.9	
