= Connolly Drive =

Road in Perth, Western Australia

Coordinates: 31°41′23″S 115°43′42″E

Connolly Drive Western Australia
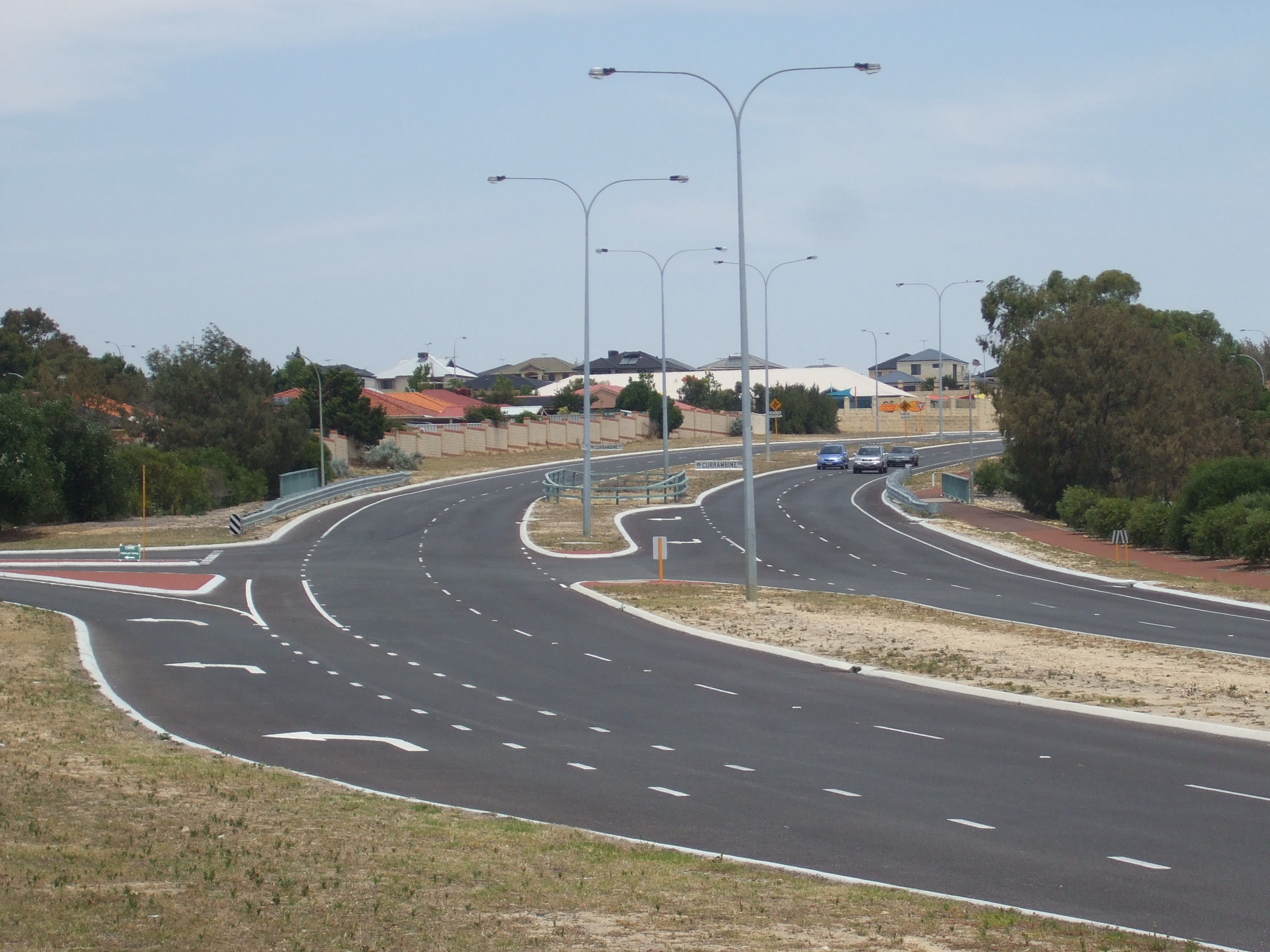
- Connolly Drive running through Currambine

General information
- Type: Road
- Length: 12.3 km (7.6 mi)
- Opened: 1990s

Major junctions
- South end: Shenton Avenue, Currambine
- Moore Drive; Burns Beach Road (State Route 87); Selkirk Drive; Neerabup Road; Hester Avenue; Lukin Drive
- North end: Benenden Avenue, Butler

Location(s)
- Major suburbs: Kinross, Tamala Park, Clarkson, Merriwa, Ridgewood

Connolly Drive is an arterial road in the outer northern suburbs of Perth, Western Australia. The road takes its name from the Perth suburb of Connolly, which lies just beyond the road's terminus.

== Route description ==
Connolly Drive starts at Shenton Avenue in Currambine, west of Joondalup's central business district, and ends after a 12.3 kilometres (7.6 mi) run at Benenden Avenue in the outer northern suburb of Butler. Connolly Drive runs parallel with fellow arterial road Marmion Avenue to the west and Mitchell Freeway to the east. A four-lane dual carriageway for its entire length, the road’s speed limit is mostly 70 kilometres per hour (43 mph), though it decreases to 60 kilometres per hour (37 mph) after Lukin Drive. The road runs within both the City of Joondalup and Wanneroo local government areas.

=== City of Joondalup ===
Connolly Drive starts at a traffic light controlled T-junction at Shenton Avenue in Currambine, running through the suburb of Currambine for 2 kilometres (1.2 mi) before encountering Burns Beach Road at a roundabout; midway it encounters Moore Drive at a roundabout. Both Connolly and Moore Drives divide Currambine into quarters. From Burns Beach Road, Connolly Drive travels through Kinross for about 1.6 kilometres (0.99 mi), intersecting local roads such as Kinross Drive, Selkirk Drive, Geoff Russell Avenue and Macnaughton Crescent. After Macnaughton Crescent, Connolly Drive heads over into the City of Wanneroo, and the uninhabited locality of Tamala Park.

=== City of Wanneroo ===
Now within the City of Wanneroo, Connolly Drive travels through Tamala Park for about 2 kilometres (1.2 mi) before entering the suburb of Clarkson and encountering Neerabup Road at a roundabout. The road proceeds to travel through the suburb for about 2.8 kilometres (1.7 mi), intersecting through several local roads, before encountering Hester Avenue at a roundabout. From there the road forms the boundary of Merriwa to the west and Ridgewood to the east for 2.1 kilometres (1.3 mi) before encountering Lukin Drive at a traffic light controlled intersection. Connolly Drive then travels through the suburb of Butler for about 1.7 kilometres (1.1 mi), after which it terminates at a roundabout with Benenden Avenue, where it continues northwards at Exmouth Drive, which provides road access to the Butler railway station.

== History ==
Connolly Drive was first built during the mid-1990s to service the then-new outer northern suburbs of Perth, with three discontinuous sections: two in the City of Joondalup (Currambine and Kinross) with the other in the City of Wanneroo (Merriwa and Ridgewood). The two sections within the City of Joondalup became continuous (running from Shenton Avenue to Selkirk Drive, then to Macnaughton Crescent) by 2001.

In 2007, the missing link through Tamala Park (MacNaughton Crescent to Neerabup Road) as a dual carriageway made the entire road continuous, and the road was extended north of Lukin Drive, to service the growing suburb of Butler. During 2010 and 2011, all single carriageway sections south of Tamala Park were duplicated in response to the growing traffic demand in the area, with several intersections being upgraded during that time as well.

More recently, the section between Neerabup Road and Lukin Drive has been duplicated and widened, in response to the extension of the Mitchell Freeway to Hester Avenue, during 2016. The remaining section of two-lane road, between Lukin Drive and Butler Boulevard, was widened to two lanes in each direction in 2020.

== Intersections ==
The most significant intersections are with Shenton Avenue, Burns Beach Road and Hester Avenue. Below is a list of all major junctions of the road. All are controlled by roundabout unless otherwise indicated.

LGA	Location	km	mi	Destinations	Notes
Joondalup	Connolly–Currambine boundary	0	0.0	Shenton Avenue – Iluka, Joondalup, Perth	Southern terminus at traffic light controlled T-junction.
Joondalup	Currambine	0.9	0.56	Moore Drive – Joondalup	
Joondalup	Currambine	1.5	0.93	Sussex Way west / Ascot Way east	
Joondalup	Currambine-Kinross boundary	2.1	1.3	Burns Beach Road (State Route 87) – Burns Beach, Carramar, Bullsbrook	Access to Currambine railway station.
Joondalup	Kinross	2.4	1.5	Kinross Drive	
Joondalup	Kinross	2.8	1.7	Selkirk Drive	Traffic light controlled T-junction.
Joondalup	Kinross	3.3	2.1	Geoff Russell Drive	
Joondalup-Wanneroo boundary	Kinross-Tamala Park boundary	3.6	2.2	Macnaughton Crescent	
Wanneroo	Clarkson	5.3	3.3	Aviator Boulevard west / Expedition Drive east	
Wanneroo	Clarkson	5.7	3.5	Neerabup Road – Mindarie, Neerabup	
Wanneroo	Clarkson	6.1	3.8	Ocean Keys Boulevard	Access to Clarkson railway station
Wanneroo	Clarkson	6.4	4.0	Northcliffe Avenue west / Riverlinks Drive east	
Wanneroo	Clarkson	7.0	4.3	Victorsen Parade west / Somerly Drive east	
Wanneroo	Clarkson-Merriwa-Ridgewood tripoint	8.6	5.3	Hester Avenue – Mindarie, Quinns Rocks, Nowergup	Connolly Drive southbound to Hester Avenue eastbound free-flowing and separate to rest of roundabout.
Wanneroo	Merriwa-Ridgewood boundary	10.0	6.2	Grand Paradiso Parade west / Tarbert Parade east	
Wanneroo	Merriwa-Ridgewood-Butler tripoint	10.6	6.6	Lukin Drive	Traffic light controlled intersection.
Wanneroo	Butler	11	6.8	McCormack Boulevard west / Kahana Parkway east	
Wanneroo	Butler	11.6	7.2	Kingsbridge Boulevard west / Landbeach Boulevard east – Jindalee	
Wanneroo	Butler	12.3	7.6	Benenden Avenue	Northern terminus at roundabout; continues north as Exmouth Drive to Butler railway station
1.000 mi = 1.609 km; 1.000 km = 0.621 mi Note: Intersections with minor local roads are not shown

== Gallery ==
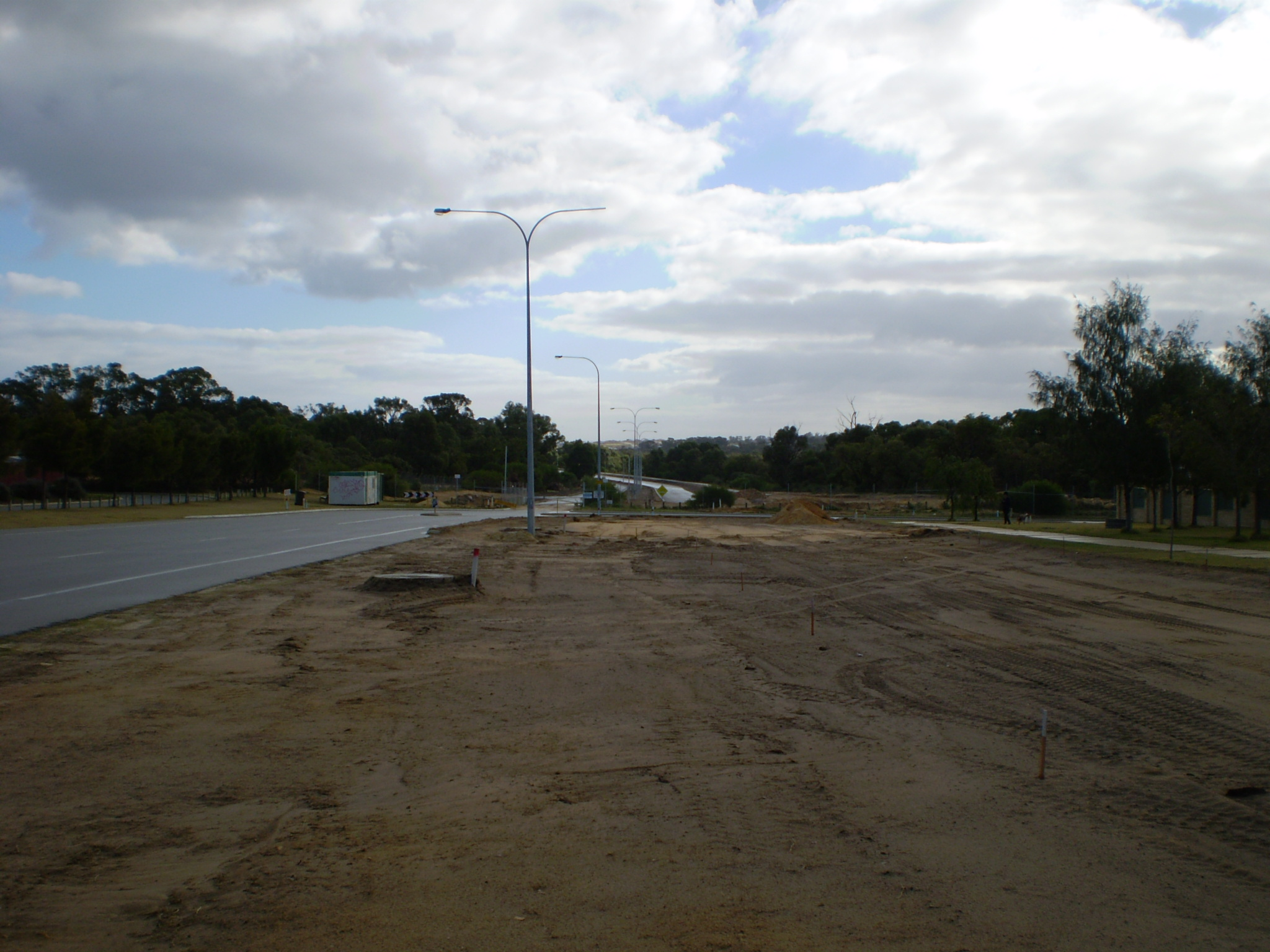
Connolly Drive Kinross - being extended into Tamala Park and on up to Clarkson (June 2007).

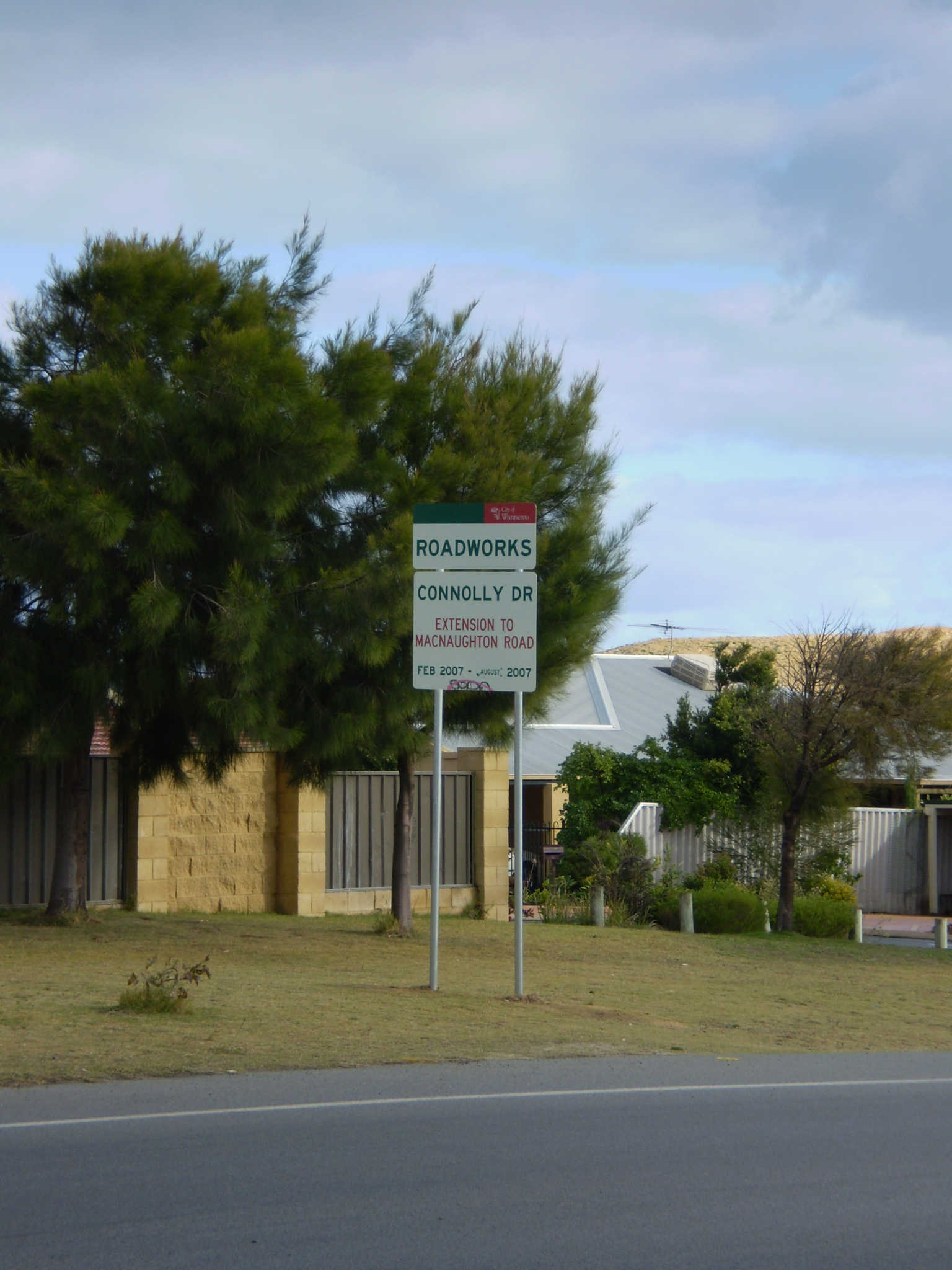
Sign showing widening of Connolly Drive up to McNaughton Crescent - Kinross (June 2007).

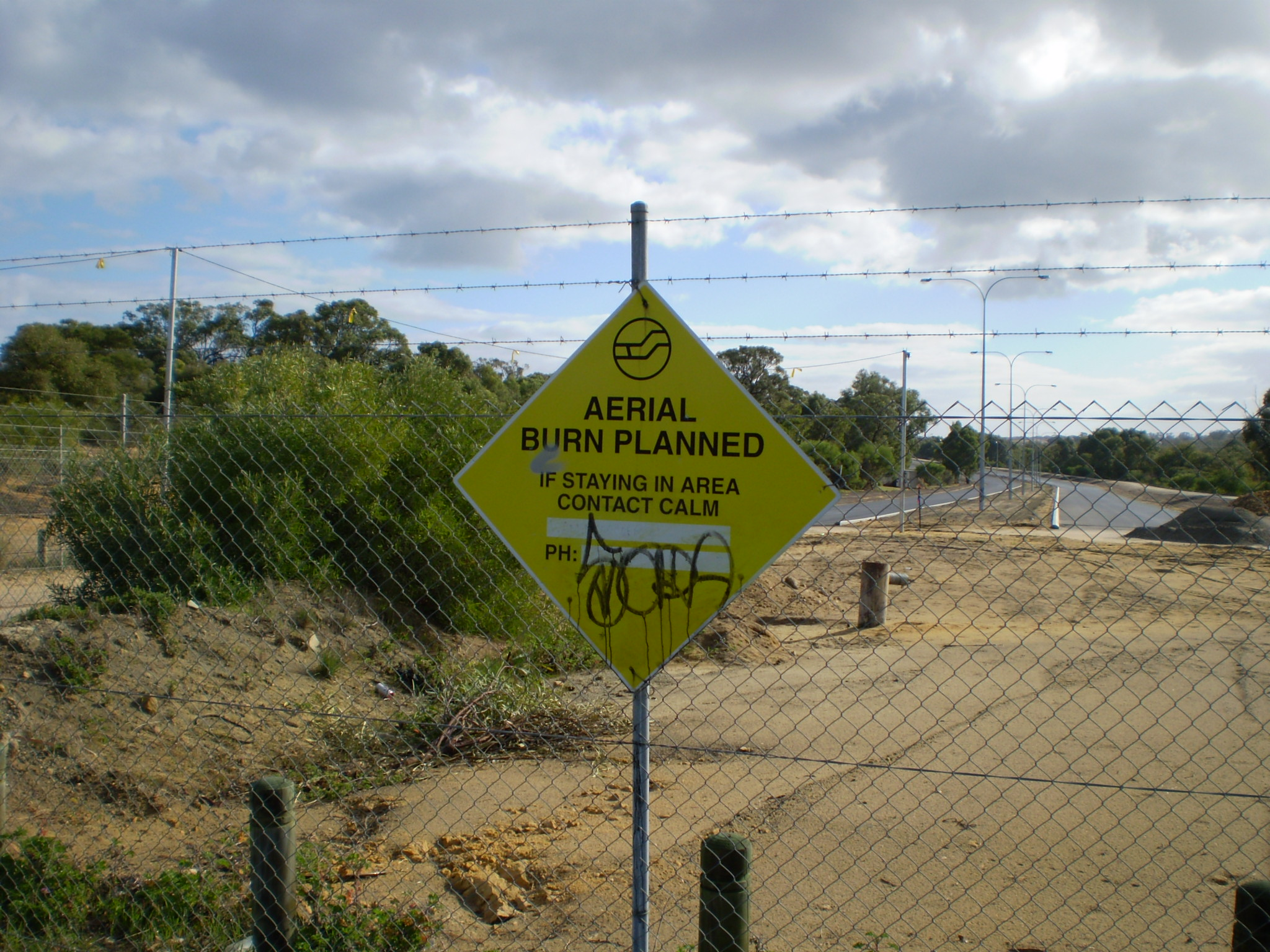
Connolly Drive Kinross - being extended "Aerial burn planned" sign (June 2007).

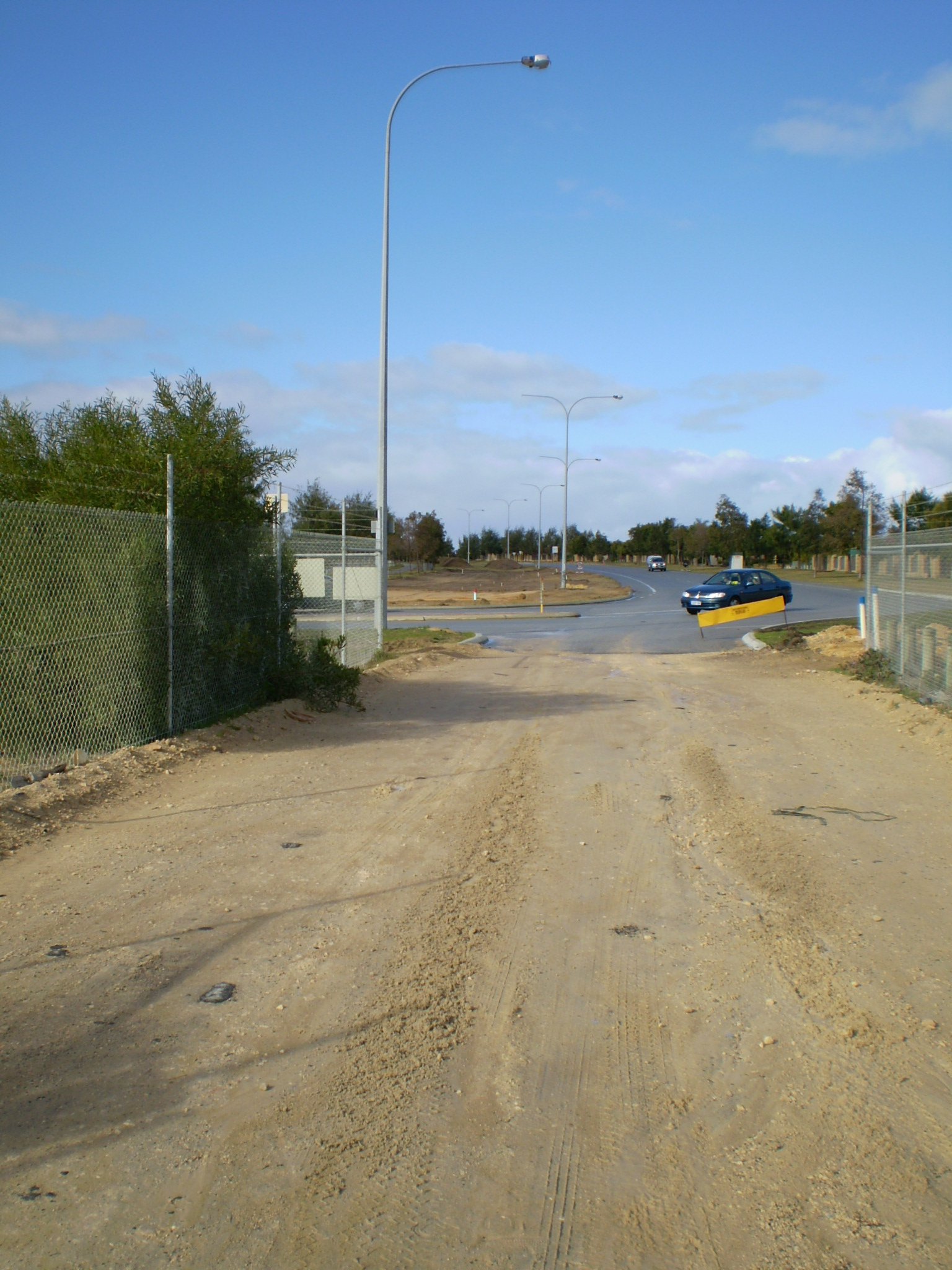
Connolly Drive Kinross - looking south to the widening works (June 2007).

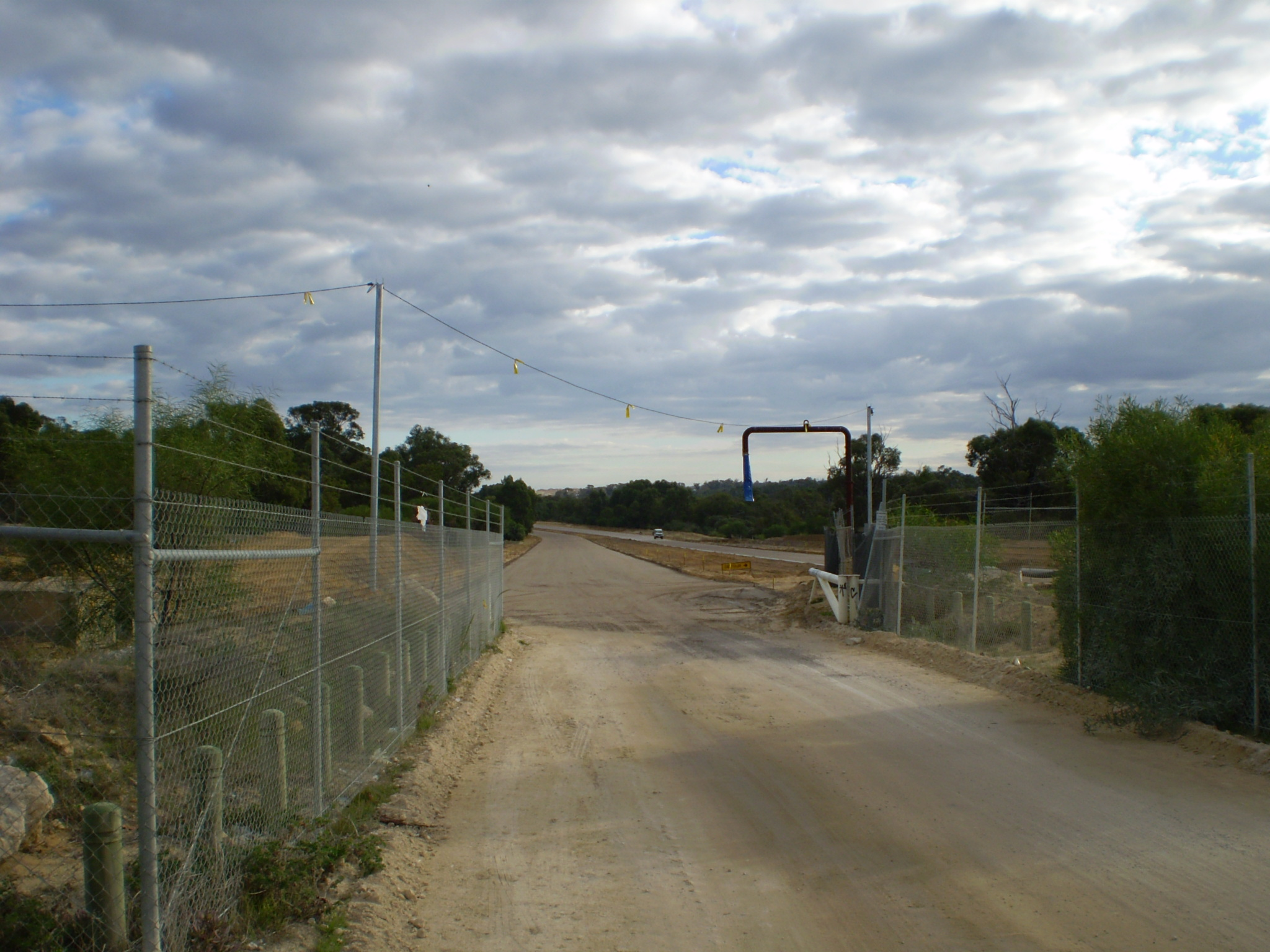
Connolly Drive's missing link between Kinross and Clarkson which opened August 2007.

View north from Shenton Avenue

View south to Shenton Avenue
