= Tamala Park, Western Australia =

Tamala Park
- Suburb
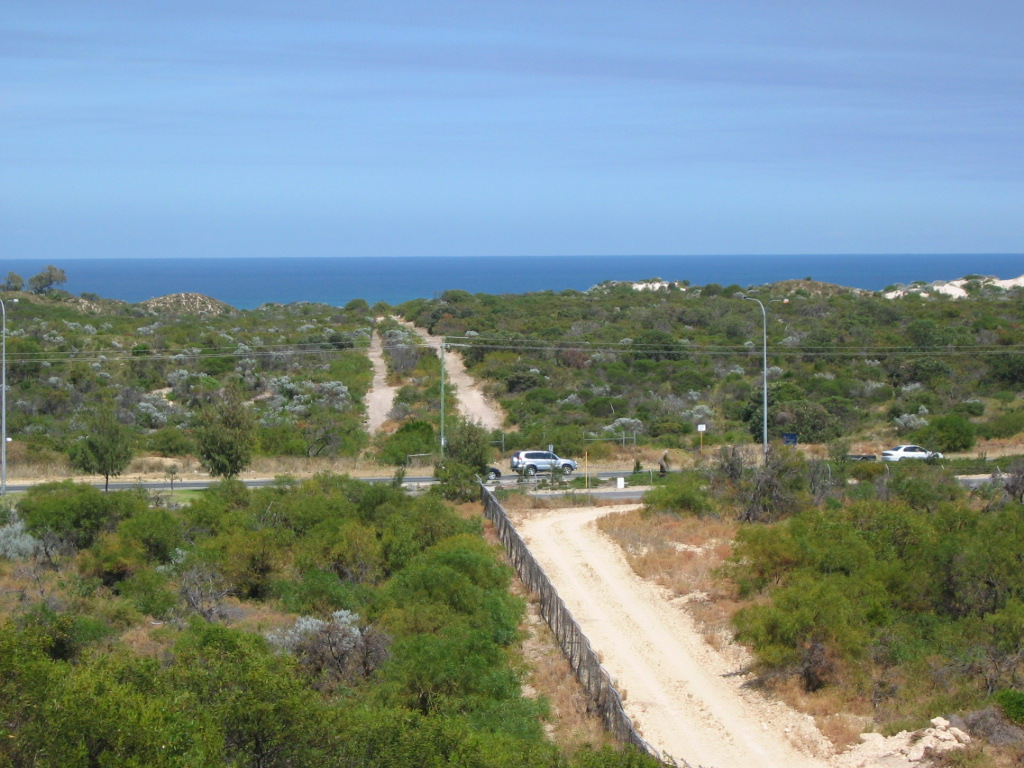
- View of Tamala Park from Kinross Hill
- Interactive map of Tamala Park
- Coordinates: 31.709°S 115.724°E
- Country: Australia
- State: Western Australia
- City: Perth
- LGA: City of Wanneroo
- Location: 31 km (19 mi) NNW of Perth CBD
- Established: 1988

Government
  - State electorate: Mindarie
  - Federal division: Pearce

Area
  - Total: 4.2 km^{2} (1.6 sq mi)

Population
  - Total: 0 (SAL 2021)
- Postcode: 6030
Suburbs around Tamala Park
| | Mindarie; Clarkson | Neerabup |
| Indian Ocean | Tamala Park | Neerabup |
| | Burns Beach; Kinross | Neerabup |

Tamala Park is an unpopulated locality in Perth, Western Australia. It sits on the border between the City of Wanneroo and the City of Joondalup local authorities, and separates the Clarkson-Butler region from the suburbs of Joondalup.

== History ==
The Mooro group of Noongar were familiar with the area, and several of their traditional stories and legends refer to local Tamala Park land features, such as Waukolup Hill, although evidence suggests that they lived much further east, closer to modern-day Wanneroo Road.

The suburb was formally established by excision of parts of Mindarie, Clarkson and Burns Beach on 9 September 1988.

== Present use ==
At present, Tamala Park is mostly unoccupied bushland, primarily used as a landfill and recycling centre. Two arterial roads, Marmion Avenue and Connolly Drive, run through it and link the suburbs on each side. It is a large locality, extending from the Yanchep line in the east, to the coast of the Indian Ocean, where it leads onto Burns Beach to the south and Claytons Beach in Mindarie to the north.

Tamala Park is in the process of being developed. The Tamala Park Regional Council (TPRC) was established to develop 165 hectares (410 acres) of land in the Tamala Park locality. The Council comprises 12 councillors representing the 7 owner councils that make up the TPRC as follows:

- Town of Cambridge
- City of Joondalup
- City of Perth
- City of Stirling
- City of Wanneroo
- Town of Victoria Park
- City of Vincent

Tamala Park is the 10th regional and 154th local government council to be established by proclamation in the Government Gazette in February 2006.

== Transport ==
=== Bus ===
- 474 Clarkson Station to Joondalup Station – serves Marmion Avenue
