= Ridgewood, Western Australia =

Ridgewood
- Suburb
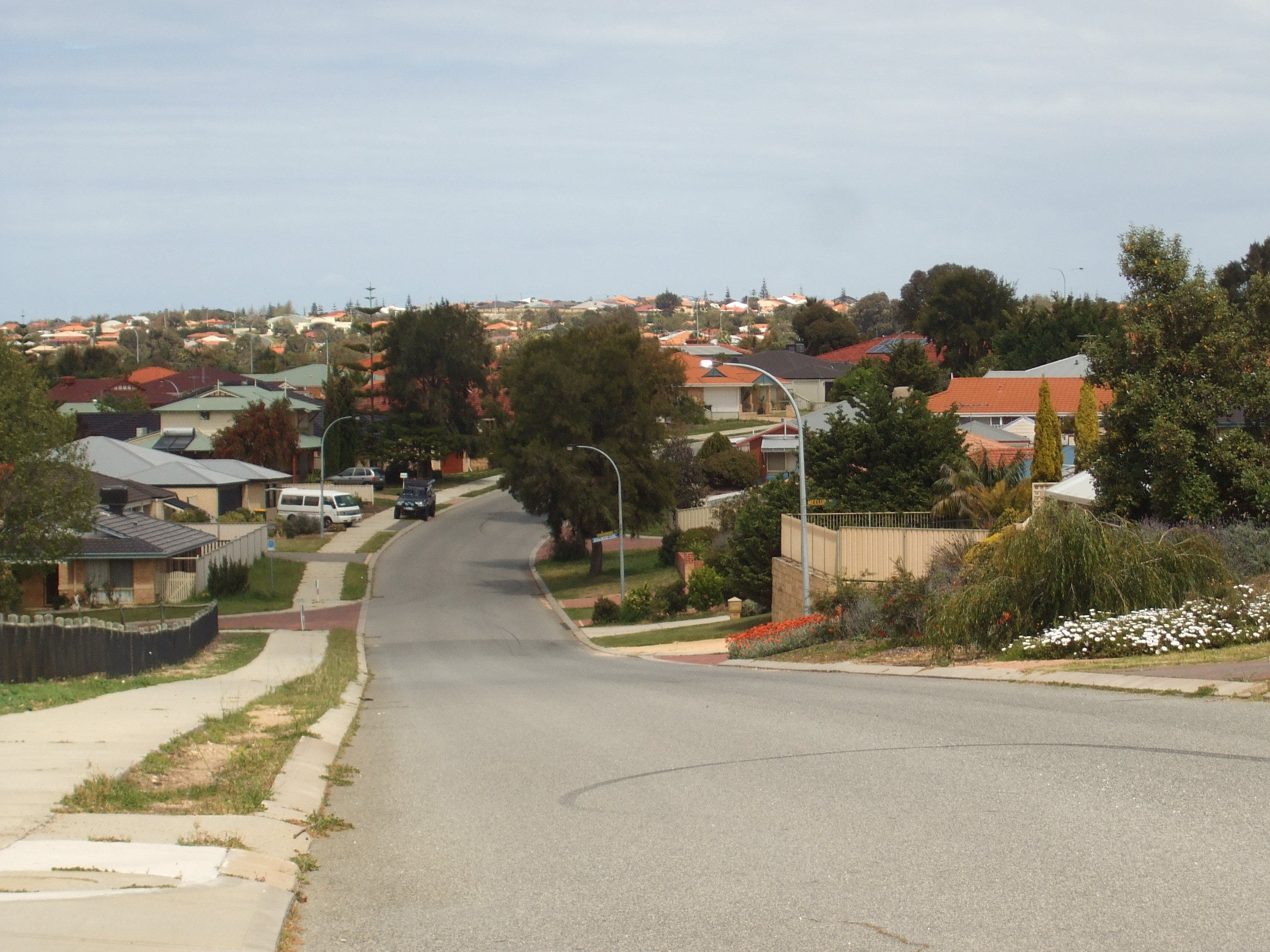
- Whitsunday Avenue
- Interactive map of Ridgewood
- Coordinates: 31.661°S 115.722°E
- Country: Australia
- State: Western Australia
- City: Perth
- LGA: City of Wanneroo
- Location: 37 km (23 mi) from Perth
- Established: 1998

Government
  - State electorate: Butler, Mindarie
  - Federal division: Pearce

Area
  - Total: 1.7 km^{2} (0.66 sq mi)

Population
  - Total: 4,623 (SAL 2021)
- Postcode: 6030
Suburbs around Ridgewood
Butler	Butler	Nowergup
Merriwa	Ridgewood	Nowergup
Clarkson	Clarkson	Neerabup

Ridgewood is an outer suburb of Perth, Western Australia, located 37 kilometres north of Perth's central business district. It is part of the City of Wanneroo local government area.

It is primarily made up of single dwellings on blocks ranging from 220m^{2} up to 800m^{2} (primarily around the 500m^{2} mark) with occasional duplex or battle axe block developments.

== Geography ==
Ridgewood is bordered to the north by Butler (Lukin Drive), to the south by Clarkson (Hester Avenue) and to the west by Merriwa (Connolly Drive). The Mitchell Freeway separates Ridgewood from the rural locality of Nowergup in the east.

== History ==
Ridgewood's name refers to the wooded terrain on the Swan Coastal Plain. The suburb was formerly a part of Merriwa until 1998, when Merriwa was split in two along Connolly Drive. The eastern half of Merriwa was gazetted as Ridgewood. At the time, only south Ridgewood was populated, containing the "Carnegie Private Estate" that was built in the mid-1990s. The estate had a population of 968.

There were campaigns for Ridgewood's separation from Merriwa as far back as 1994, not long after the Carnegie Estate had been built by developers Town and Country Holdings. The developers lodged a request with the City of Wanneroo to bifurcate the area from Merriwa and rename the new locality "Carnegie", after the estate, which in turn was named in honour of David Carnegie, one of the earliest explorers of Western Australia. Although the request was rejected, the City supported the excision of the estate from Merriwa, leading to the creation of Ridgewood four years later.

The northern half of Ridgewood, "The Vistas", is a new development by Satterley, marketed as a part of the "Brighton Estate" that covers the adjoining suburbs of Butler and Jindalee.

== Demographics ==
Ridgewood had a population of 1,292 at the 2006 census, an increase of 324 since the 2001 census. The population is predicted to grow exponentially, peaking at 5,903 in 2016. The demographics of Ridgewood's residents are similar to Merriwa, with the same average age of 33 (compared to 37 nationally) and income levels slightly below the national average.

Like all surrounding suburbs, Christianity is the predominant religious affiliation of Ridgewood's residents, accounting for 48.5% of the population across various Christian denominations. However, the suburb contains no churches but does have a Kingdom Hall for Jehovah's Witnesses. 27.4% declared no religion.

== Amenities and facilities ==
Ridgewood is primarily a residential suburb, with a BP service station in its south-west and almost no other facilities or retail establishments. However, it is positioned directly in between the suburbs of Butler, Merriwa and Clarkson, which all contain a sizeable number of shops and services that Ridgewood residents rely on, including the large Ocean Keys Shopping Centre in Clarkson.

As with neighbouring suburbs, Ridgewood contains several parks. Ridgewood Park in the south-west is the largest by area, and contains a sports pitch and a large pond.

Telephone services are provided by the Quinns Rocks telephone exchange.

== Education ==
Ridgewood is combined in census data with larger surrounding suburbs Butler and Merriwa, indicating the suburb does not have the population to necessitate its own educational facilities.

The nearest primary school to Ridgewood is Merriwa Primary School., while high-school aged Ridgewood residents will either fall into the Clarkson Community High School or the Butler College catchment areas. This horizontal split of Hinchinbrook Avenue, Ridgewood Boulevard and Kilkee Street splits the north and south sides of the suburb into their respective high school catchments.

== Transport ==
The Mitchell Freeway forms the suburb's eastern boundary, with interchanges at Lukin Drive and Hester Avenue. Hester Avenue, in the south of Ridgewood, also links to Marmion Avenue and Wanneroo Road. Connolly Drive runs along Ridgewood's western boundary and provides a road link into Joondalup and the Mitchell Freeway.

The area is served by the 484 bus route to Clarkson railway station, the nearest major transport hub, providing rail and bus links to Joondalup and Perth.

=== Bus ===
- 484 Clarkson Station to Butler Station – serves Hester Avenue, Ridgewood Boulevard and Hinchinbrook Avenue

== Politics ==
Ridgewood's political leanings are unclear due to its diminutive population and lack of specified polling booth. The nearest booth in Merriwa tends to favour the Australian Labor Party at state level, while voting Liberal Party at federal level.

Like Merriwa, the suburb is part of the Electoral district of Butler at state level, and the Division of Pearce at federal level.
