= Hester Avenue =

Road in Perth, Australia

Hester Avenue Western Australia
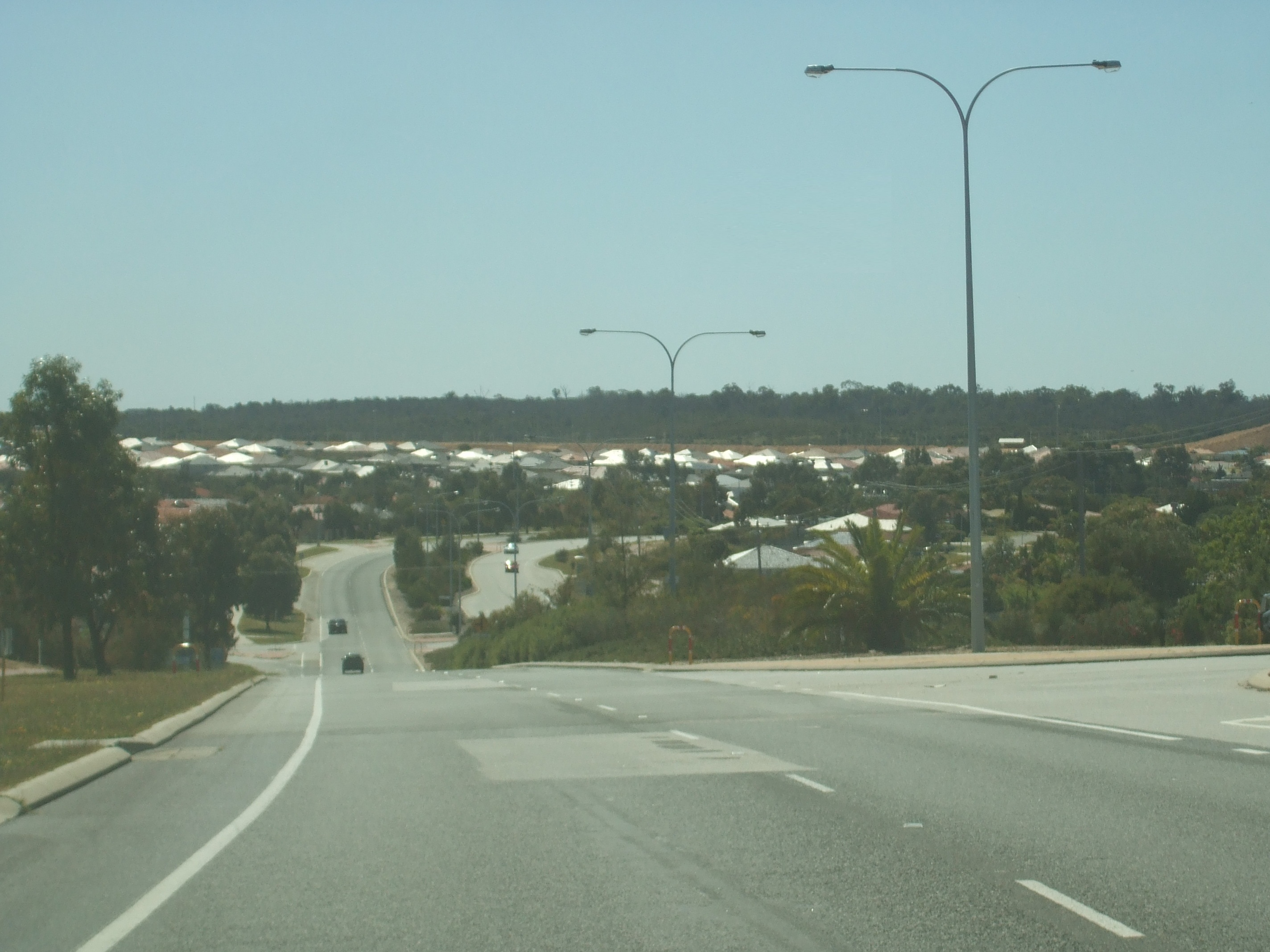
- View east towards Ridgewood
- Location of Hester Avenue within the Perth Metropolitan Region
- Coordinates: 31°40′12.7″S 115°43′48″E

General information
- Type: Road
- Length: 2.8 km (1.7 mi)

Major junctions
- East end: Wanneroo Road (State Route 60), Neerabup
- Mitchell Freeway; Connolly Drive
- West end: Marmion Avenue (State Route 71), Mindarie

Location(s)
- Major suburbs: Nowergup, Ridgewood, Clarkson, Merriwa

Hester Avenue (previously known as Quinns Road) is an east-west distributor road in the northern suburbs of Perth, Western Australia, located within the City of Wanneroo. It primarily links the coastal suburbs of the Clarkson-Butler region to the arterial highway Wanneroo Road in the east.

The road begins as a four-lane dual carriageway at Wanneroo Road, before intersecting with the Mitchell Freeway at Clarkson in the form of an elongated dogbone roundabout separated by a bridge crossing both the freeway and the Yanchep line. The road terminates at a roundabout with Marmion Avenue, where it becomes Anchorage Drive North, a local distributor road in the suburb of Mindarie. The speed limit begins at 60 km/h, increasing to 70 km/h at the dual carriageway.

Direct access to the Nowergup railway depot is also provided by the road.

== History ==
Hester Avenue was designed in the early 1970s as a new alignment of Quinns Road, an already-existing east-west road that directly linked Wanneroo Road to the coastal townsite of Quinns Rocks. It was named after Thomas Hester, an early settler and local land-owner in the area, whose name was also initially proposed for the adjoining suburb of Merriwa.

The new alignment was first built in 1990 to coincide with the developments of Mindarie and Merriwa by Smith Corporation, running onto the original Quinns Road at the intersection of the future Connolly Drive. The portion of Quinns Road in between Marmion Avenue and Connolly Drive was then closed to general traffic and turned into a cul-de-sac in Merriwa, where it was renamed Palermo Court.

Hester Avenue deviates south-westerly from the original Quinns Road from Connolly Drive onwards, where it runs directly into Mindarie. Quinns Road west of Marmion Avenue survives today as a local distributor road in Quinns Rocks, while the unaltered portion east of Connolly Drive now assumes the name Hester Avenue for its entire length.

The road was built into a dual carriageway from Marmion Avenue to Hidden Valley Retreat, Clarkson, in 2003.

In 2017 the Hester Avenue Bridge was demolished and replaced as part of the wider Mitchell Freeway Expansion. It was the northern terminus of the Mitchell Freeway from August 2017 until July 2023, when the extension of the Mitchell Freeway from Hester Avenue to Romeo Road was completed.

== Intersections ==
The entire road is in the City of Wanneroo local government area.

Location	km	mi	Destinations	Notes
Neerabup–Nowergup boundary	0	0.0	Wanneroo Road (State Route 60) – Wanneroo, Perth, Lancelin	Eastern terminus at T junction
Neerabup–Nowergup–Ridgewood–Clarkson quadripoint	0.9	0.56	Mitchell Freeway (State Route 2) – Joondalup, Perth	Elongated dogbone-style roundabout
Ridgewood–Clarkson boundary	1.2	0.75	Hidden Valley Retreat – Clarkson	
Ridgewood–Clarkson boundary	1.4	0.87	Ridgewood Boulevard – Ridgewood	
Ridgewood–Clarkson boundary	1.6	0.99	Porongorup Drive – Clarkson	
Ridgewood–Merriwa–Clarkson tripoint	1.8	1.1	Connolly Drive – Butler, Kinross, Currambine	Roundabout
Merriwa–Clarkson boundary	2.3	1.4	Baltimore Parade – Merriwa	
Merriwa–Clarkson boundary	2.6	1.6	Renshaw Boulevard – Clarkson	
Merriwa–Clarkson–Mindarie tripoint	2.9	1.8	Marmion Avenue (State Route 71) north & south / Anchorage Drive west – Yanchep, Ocean Reef, Hillarys, Mindarie	Western terminus at roundabout
1.000 mi = 1.609 km; 1.000 km = 0.621 mi
