= Electoral district of Mindarie =

Former state electoral district of Western Australia

Mindarie Western Australia—Legislative Assembly
- Interactive map of district boundaries from the 2025 state election
- State: Western Australia
- Dates current: 2005–2013; 2025–
- MP: Mark Folkard
- Party: Labor
- Namesake: Mindarie
- Electors: 32,160 (2025)
- Area: 38 km^{2} (14.7 sq mi)
- Demographic: Outer Metropolitan
- Coordinates: 31.69°S 115.70°E
Electorates around Mindarie:
| Butler | Butler | Wanneroo |
| Indian Ocean | Mindarie | Wanneroo |
| Indian Ocean | Joondalup | Joondalup |

Mindarie is an electoral district of the Legislative Assembly in the Australian state of Western Australia. The district is named for the outer northern Perth suburb of Mindarie, which falls within its borders. The district was in use from 2005 to 2013, and was recreated for the 2025 Western Australian state election.

== History ==
Mindarie was originally created at the 2003 redistribution out of parts of Wanneroo and Joondalup, accounting for significant population growth in the City of Wanneroo which had pulled the Wanneroo district northwards and eastwards in order to keep all seats at a roughly equal population. The seat was first contested in the 2005 election at which Labor member John Quigley, who had formerly represented the abolished inner-northern seat of Innaloo, was successful.

Mindarie was abolished by the 2011 redistribution, replaced by the electorate of Butler at the 2013 state election. The change was necessitated by the move of the namesake suburb into the neighbouring electorate of Ocean Reef, later renamed Burns Beach.

The electoral district of Burns Beach was renamed Mindarie prior to the 2025 Western Australian state election when Mark Folkard was elected. The change was necessitated by the move of the namesake suburb into the neighbouring electorate of Joondalup.

== Geography ==
The first iteration of Mindarie stretched from the coastal boundary of the City of Wanneroo to its northern and eastern limits, and comprised 547 km² of land otherwise bounded in the south by the Kinross east-west boundary fence, Burns Beach Road, Wanneroo Road, Flynn Drive, Old Yanchep Road and Neaves Road. Its boundaries include the outposts of Yanchep and Two Rocks, the populated suburbs of Butler, Jindalee, Clarkson, Merriwa, Mindarie, Quinns Rocks and Ridgewood, the semi-rural localities of Carabooda, Neerabup, Nowergup, and the unpopulated localities of Alkimos, Eglinton, Pinjar and Tamala Park.

The 2007 redistribution, which took effect at the 2008 election, radically changed the boundaries—the seat then only included the southern part of Quinns Rocks and all of Clarkson, Mindarie and Tamala Park of the region now included within it. The rest of the seat, within the City of Joondalup, included the suburbs of Burns Beach, Currambine, Iluka, Kinross, Ocean Reef and a small northwestern section of Mullaloo. Those regions were placed the new seat of Ocean Reef.

With more residential development occurring since then, the post-2023 iteration of Mindarie is smaller, containing only the six populated suburbs of Clarkson, Merriwa, Mindarie, Quinns Rocks and Ridgewood in the City of Wanneroo; as well as Kinross in the City of Joondalup. The semi-rural localities of Neerabup and Tamala ParK are also included.

== Members for Mindarie ==
| Member | Party | Term |
|---|---|---|
| John Quigley | Labor | 2005–2013 |
Seat abolished (2013–2025)
| Mark Folkard | Labor | 2025–present |

== Election results ==
2025 Western Australian state election: Mindarie
| Party | Candidate | Votes | % | ±% |
|---|---|---|---|---|
| Labor | Mark Folkard | 11,454 | 44.7 | −26.6 |
| Liberal | Paul Miles | 6,606 | 25.8 | +8.2 |
| Greens | Scott McCarthy | 2,418 | 9.4 | +3.9 |
| One Nation | John Burton | 1,798 | 7.0 | +7.0 |
| Legalise Cannabis | Lee Hunt | 1,325 | 5.2 | +5.2 |
| Animal Justice | Penelope Hall | 913 | 3.6 | +3.6 |
| Christians | Patrick Thomas | 820 | 3.2 | +0.8 |
| Shooters, Fishers, Farmers | Christian Mellon | 306 | 1.2 | +1.2 |
| Total formal votes | | 25,640 | 95.3 | −1.0 |
| Informal votes | | 1,277 | 4.7 | +1.0 |
| Turnout | | 26,917 | 83.7 | +3.1 |
Two-party-preferred result
| Labor | Mark Folkard | 15,710 | 61.3 | −16.6 |
| Liberal | Paul Miles | 9,910 | 38.7 | +16.6 |
| Labor hold | | Swing | −16.6 | |
