= Lorna Clarke =

Western Australian politician

Lorna Clarke MLA

President of the Western Australian Labor Party Executive
- Incumbent
- Assumed role 12 July 2022
- Leader: Mark McGowan; Roger Cook
- Preceded by: Tim Picton

Member of the Western Australian Legislative Assembly
- Incumbent
- Assumed office 8 March 2025
- Preceded by: John Quigley
- Constituency: Butler

City of Bayswater Councillor
- In office 21 October 2017 – 31 December 2024
- Constituency: West Ward

Personal details
- Born: Sheffield, United Kingdom
- Party: Labor
- Website: lornaclarke.com.au

Lorna Clarke is an Australian politician from the Labor Party who is member of the Western Australian Legislative Assembly for the electoral district of Butler. She won her seat at the 2025 Western Australian state election.

== Biography ==
Born in Sheffield, England, Clarke moved to Sydney as a baby. She has been a corporate lawyer, lecturer in law at Curtin University and President of the WA Labor Party.

Clarke was elected to the West Ward of the City of Bayswater council in October 2017. She was a senior adviser to Police Minister Michelle Roberts at the time, which meant she was not allowed to campaign on police or crime issues. She was re-elected in October 2021.

Ahead of the 2025 Western Australian state election, Clarke was considered likely to nominate for the seat of Landsdale to replace Margaret Quirk, but after Daniel Pastorelli joined the Right faction, the same faction as Clarke and Quirk, Clarke instead nominated for Butler, to succeed the retiring member John Quigley.

Clarke resigned as councillor in the City of Bayswater effective 31 December 2024 to campaign in the state election. She retained the seat of Butler for Labor.

Western Australian Legislative Assembly
Preceded by John Quigley	Member for Butler; 2025–present	Incumbent
