= Clarkson, Western Australia =

Clarkson
- Suburb
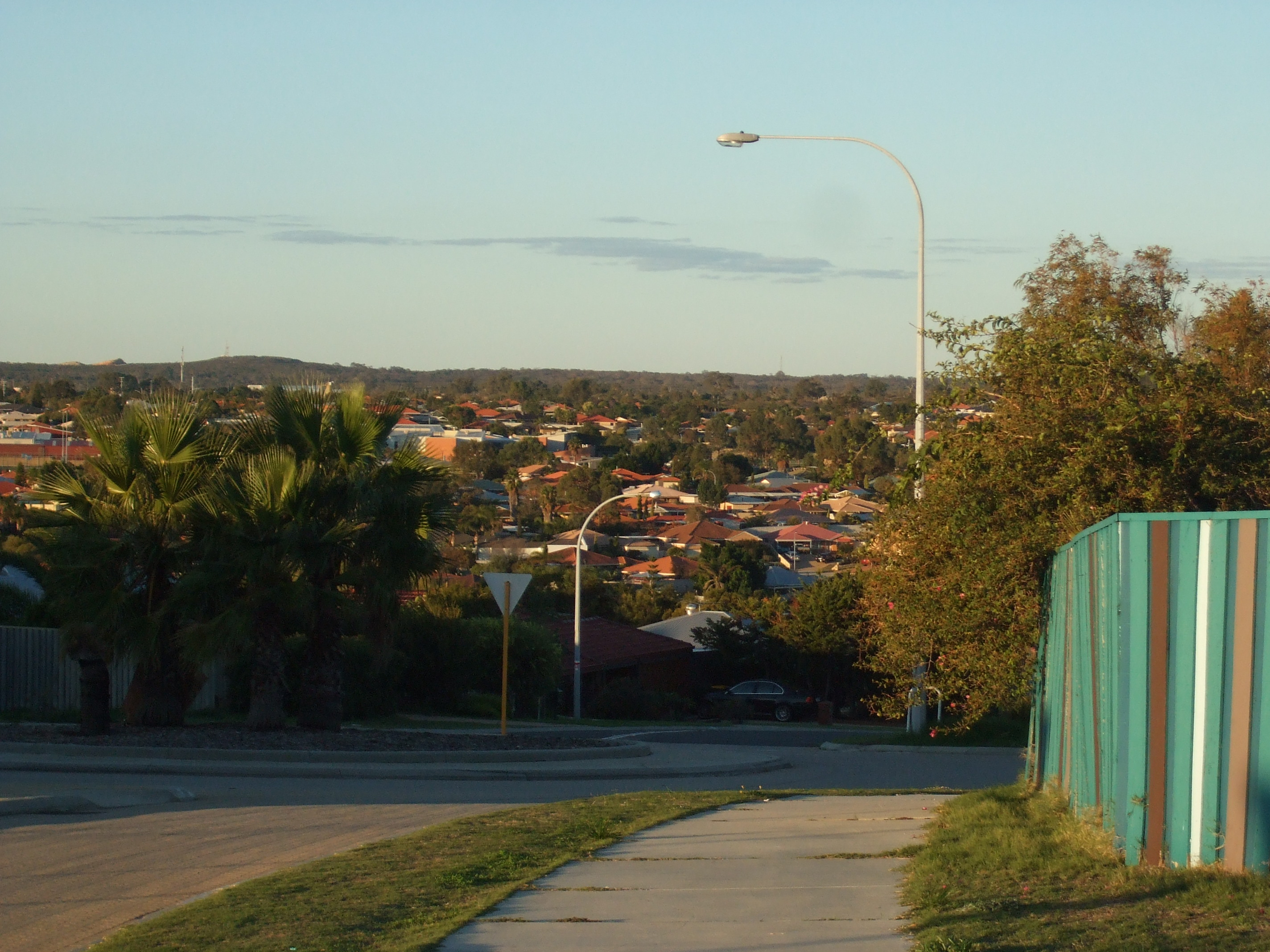
- Renshaw Boulevard, Clarkson, facing east
- Interactive map of Clarkson
- Coordinates: 31.684°S 115.728°E
- Country: Australia
- State: Western Australia
- City: Perth
- LGA: City of Wanneroo
- Location: 34 km (21 mi) NNW of Perth CBD
- Established: 1990s

Government
  - State electorate: Burns Beach
  - Federal division: Pearce

Area
  - Total: 6.6 km^{2} (2.5 sq mi)

Population
  - Total: 13,904 (SAL 2021)
- Postcode: 6030
Suburbs around Clarkson
Quinns Rocks	Merriwa; Ridgewood	Nowergup
Mindarie	Clarkson	Neerabup
Tamala Park	Tamala Park	Neerabup

Clarkson is an outer northern suburb of Perth, Western Australia, located 34 kilometres north of the central business district in the City of Wanneroo.

Clarkson serves as a major satellite town centre, serving the surrounding areas with a vast amount of shops, amenities and facilities, including a railway station and public transport hub on the Yanchep railway line.

== Geography ==
Clarkson is bounded to the west by Mindarie (Marmion Avenue) and to the north by Merriwa and Ridgewood (Hester Avenue). The Yanchep railway line divides Clarkson from the Neerabup National Park in the east. South of Clarkson is Tamala Park, which is uninhabited.

It is approximately 2 kilometres (1.2 mi) away from the Indian Ocean and the coastlines of Claytons Beach and Quinns Beach.

== History ==
=== Name ===
The suburb's name refers to the Clarksons, a family of sheep farmers who had held leases of land in the area since the 19th century. Clarkson was originally gazetted as "Mindarie" by the Shire of Wanneroo in 1979, but the two names were transposed in 1985 at the request of Smith Corporation, who went on to develop the Mindarie Keys Marina three years later.

=== Early use ===
The first permanent settler with European ancestry in the area was the Barnard Drummond Clarkson, a sheep-farmer who also held land in Toodyay. Clarkson first acquired a pastoral lease in 1888 of 13,000 acres in the areas comprising modern-day Mindarie, Clarkson, Quinns Rocks and Merriwa. The leases were known as the Mindarie Pastoral Company, and the lands were primarily used for sheep-herding by subsequent generations of the Clarkson family.

The ruins of the Clarksons' first homestead and home of the Mindarie Pastoral Company are today preserved in Riverlinks Park on Connolly Drive.

=== Suburban development ===
The Mindarie Pastoral Company leases were sold by John Clarkson in 1952. The land remained undeveloped and largely uninhabited until the early 1990s, following the completion of the nearby Mindarie Marina and the construction of residential dwellings in the area. Development of the northeastern portion of Clarkson, around the high school, began later in 1995. The suburb continued to expand throughout the 2000s, experiencing steady population growth.

Outside Clarkson’s main commercial area in the southwest, the suburb is predominantly made up of residential detached bungalows surrounded by extensive parklands. A strip of two-storey apartment buildings runs along Ocean Keys Boulevard, directly opposite the railway station, while another row of apartments is located nearer to the shopping center on Ningaloo Bend. The suburb also features a significant number of Keystart homes.

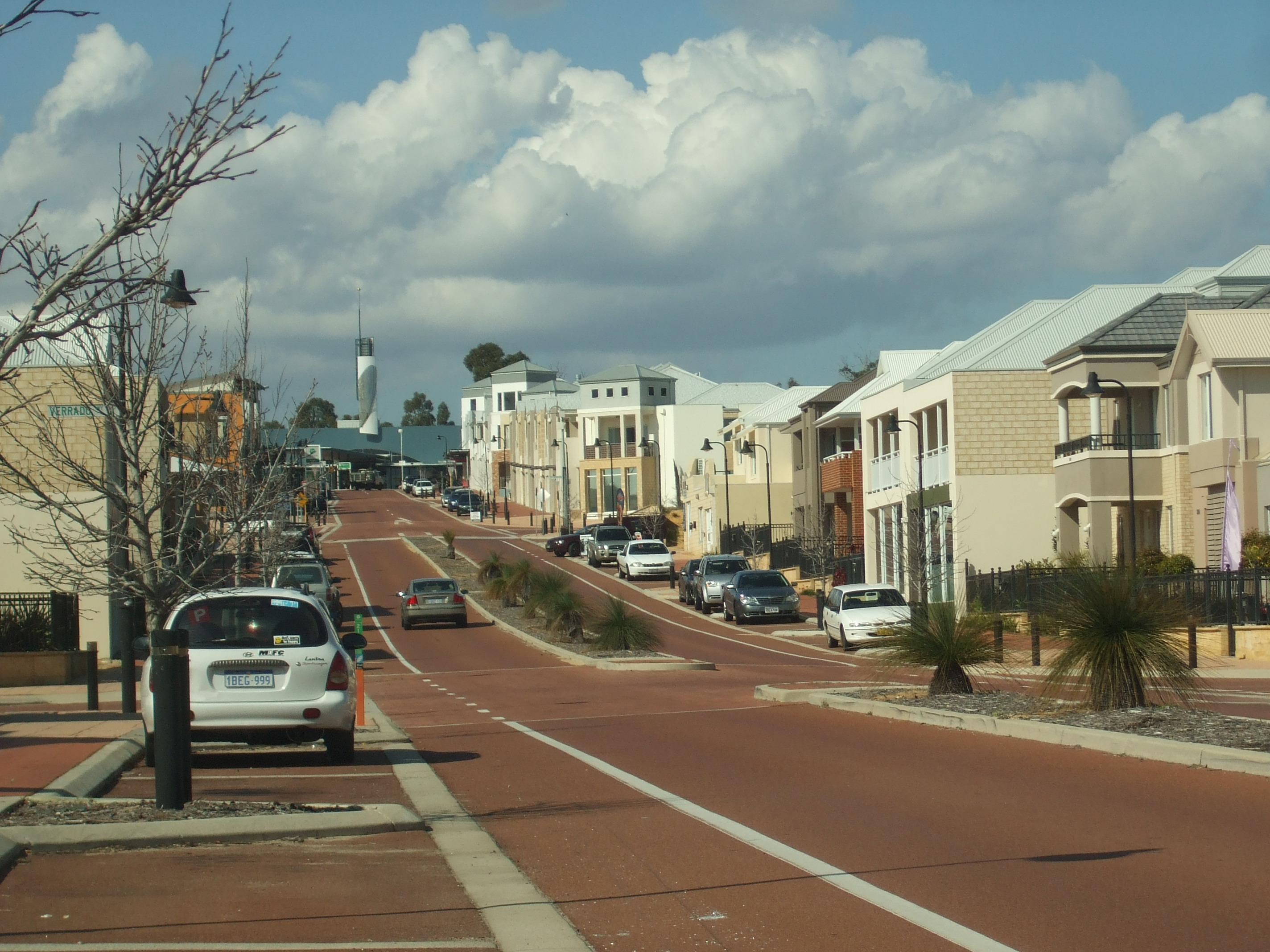
Ocean Keys Boulevard leading to Clarkson railway station

=== Somerly ===
Somerly is a commercial and housing development in south-east Clarkson, principally surrounding the railway station, that was completed in 2008. The 1,800-lot community was built on a 162-hectare (400-acre) area in a partnership between development company Urban Pacific and the Government of Western Australia's Department of Housing & Works land development agency Landstart. The project aimed to provide a community-within-a-community with commercial enterprise, fibre-optic to the home internet, and a landscaping package (totaling at A$8,000) at no extra cost to new home-buyers.

The development of the Somerly area made Clarkson one of the largest, most densely populated suburbs in Perth's northern corridor, with a population now approaching 12,000. It is roughly delineated from the older, established parts of Clarkson by Liberty Drive to the north, Connolly Drive to the west and Polglase Fairway to the south-west.

=== Catalina ===
A new residential estate under the preliminary name of "Catalina" is being planned for development in 2012. The estate's proposed boundaries lay south of Neerabup Road (which is presently bushland blending into Tamala Park) and extend from the Joondalup rail line in the east, to the coast of Mindarie Beach and Claytons Beach to the west. Although the land is part of Clarkson and Mindarie at present, Satterley, the developers, intend for the estate to eventually be re-gazetted as its own suburb.

== Demographics ==
Clarkson had a population of 7,082 at the 2006 census, an increase of 1,214 persons since the 2001 census. The population of Clarkson is predicted to continue to grow at an exponential rate, peaking at 18,645 in 2026. Only 58.9% of Clarkson's population were born in Australia compared to a nationwide average of 70.9%. A significant British-born population is present, being 15.4%, although this is a smaller proportion compared to some nearby suburbs, such as Mindarie. Most other major immigrant groups in Clarkson hail from Anglophone countries, such as New Zealand and South Africa.

Clarkson has a very young population, with an average age of 28, a figure drastically lower than all surrounding suburbs, as well as the national average age of 37. Income levels in Clarkson are generally in line with the Australian national average, with an average household income of $1,049 per week, compared to $1,027 per week nationally.

Christianity is the predominant religious affiliation declared by Clarkson's residents, at 44% of the population, across various denominations. Several churches are scattered throughout the suburb; Clarkson Seventh-day Adventist Community Church, St. Andrew's Catholic Church and Ocean Keys Community Church (Lutheran). 28% of the suburb declared no religion.

2.8% of Clarkson's population is composed of Indigenous Australians, compared to 2.3% nationwide. Only neighbouring Merriwa reflects this trend; the Aboriginal population is much less significant in the surrounding suburbs.

== Amenities and facilities ==
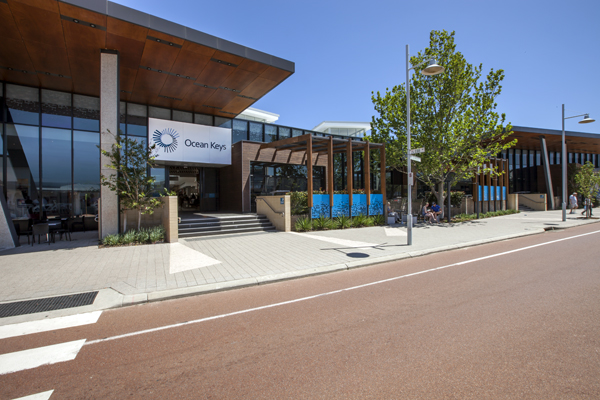
Ocean Keys Shopping Centre, Clarkson

Compared to surrounding suburbs, Clarkson is a very mixed-use area with an abundance of facilities and a very large shopping and retail district, establishing it as a commercial town centre for the northern suburbs beyond the nearby city of Joondalup. The main road, Ocean Keys Boulevard, is home to the Ocean Keys Shopping Centre, a major shopping mall with over 100 stores; including Aldi, Kmart, Coles, TK Maxx and JB Hi-Fi. A Woolworths supermarket is located south of the shopping centre, in the old Bunnings building.

Many more commercial outlets surround the centre, including a large Bunnings warehouse, a post office, two service stations and car dealerships.

A row of restaurants and take-away outlets is located directly west of the shopping centre, with additional restaurants and pubs scattered throughout the suburb. Clarkson is served by three medical centres: Clarkson Family Practice, Ocean Keys Family Practice, and The Somerly Central Medical Centre. Opposite Ocean Keys Shopping Centre sits the Clarkson Library.

The suburb also features a smaller shopping market in its earliest developed area, situated opposite Clarkson Primary School at the corner of Renshaw Boulevard and Ainsbury Parade.

There is an abundance of entertainment and leisure facilities around Clarkson. Over ten parks are located throughout the suburb, the two main ones being Anthony Waring Park and Richard Aldersea Park in the centre of the suburb. Anthony Waring Park is the largest by area and features sporting facilities. Many smaller parks around Somerly include playgrounds and free barbecue areas for families. The Clarkson Youth Centre, near Ocean Keys Shopping Centre, functions as a community centre and is also part of a wider youth precinct, incorporating a skate park and BMX tracks. Nearby is also the Clarkson Library, one of four public libraries in the Wanneroo area.

Clarkson also accommodates the Clarkson Police Station, which serves all surrounding suburbs from Tamala Park to Butler and Jindalee. A Western Power electricity substation is located off Hester Avenue in the north-east of the suburb, near the Yanchep railway line. Telephone services are provided by the Mindarie & Quinns Rocks telephone exchanges.

== Education ==
Two state K-7 primary schools are established in Clarkson, serving different parts of the suburb. Clarkson Primary School is the oldest established school and caters to western Clarkson, while Somerly Primary School serves the Somerly estate in the east. Students also have the option of St. Andrew's Catholic Primary School, a private Catholic school located next to St. Andrew's Catholic Church.

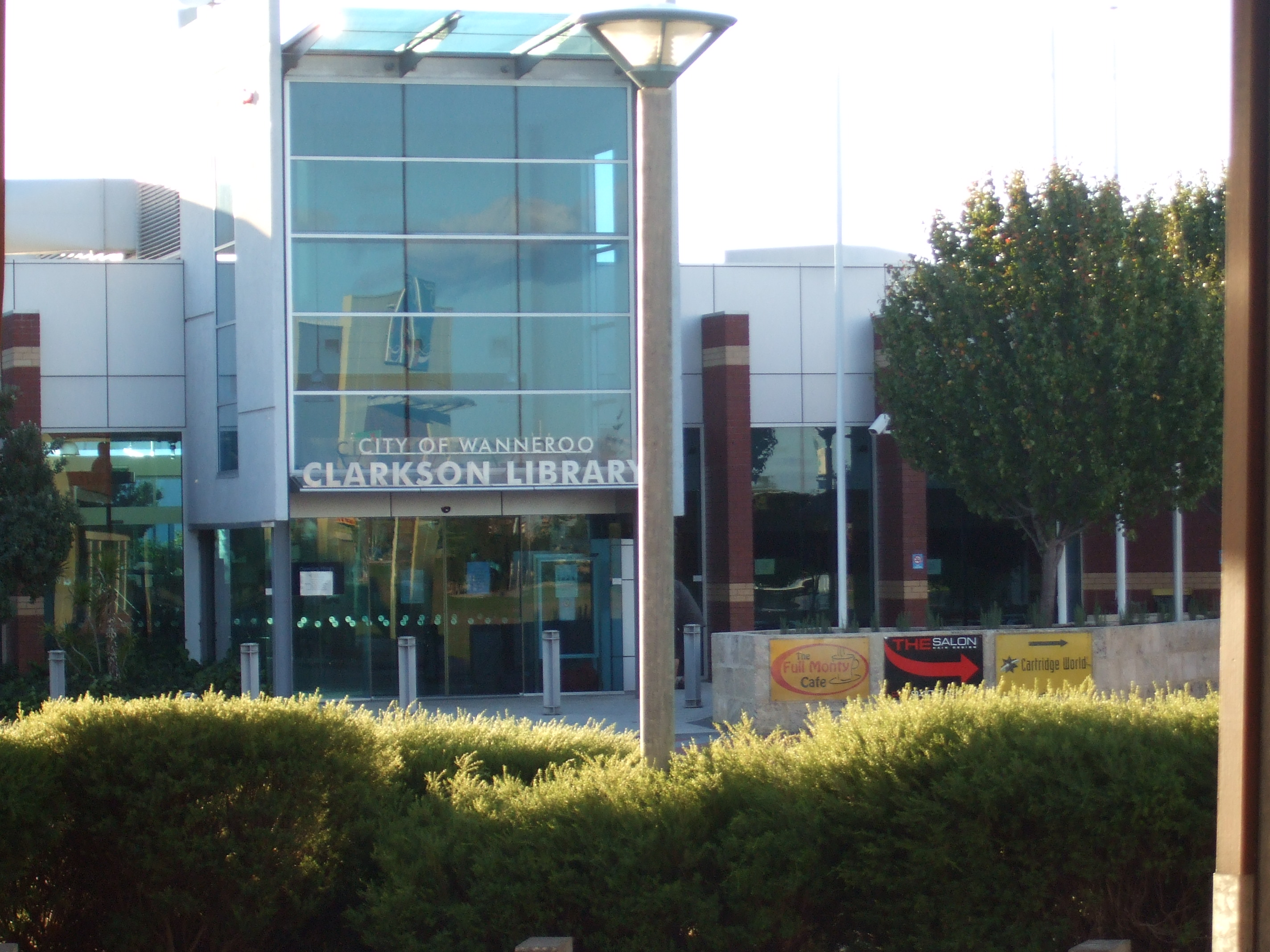
Clarkson Library

Clarkson also accommodates Clarkson Community High School, a large Year 8-12 state high school established in 1996. As it is the only state high school in the vicinity (other than the 11-12 Mindarie Senior College), it covers a large catchment area, extending up to Butler and Jindalee in the north. In 2010, Trades North, a TAFE campus specializing in skilled trades and apprenticeships, was built next to the high school and opened for the 2011 school year. It is part of the North Metropolitan TAFE.

== Transport ==
Clarkson straddles the western edge of the Mitchell Freeway, linking it to Joondalup and the Perth CBD, with interchanges at Neerabup Road in the south and Hester Avenue in the north. Marmion Avenue and Connolly Drive are major north-south arterial roads that pass through Clarkson on the way to Yanchep and Alkimos, while Neerabup Road and Hester Avenue both run east-west to Wanneroo Road a short distance inland.

Up until the late-2000s, Marmion Avenue and Hester Avenue were the only roads in and out of Clarkson. Connolly Drive was extended to Clarkson from Kinross in 2008, while Neerabup Road was extended from Connolly Drive into southeast Clarkson and across to Wanneroo Road in 2016.

Clarkson railway station on the Yanchep railway line opened in October 2004 in the suburb's southeast. It was the terminus of the then line until 2014, when it was extended north to Butler. It provides bus and rail links to Joondalup and Yanchep, and a direct rail link to Perth and Mandurah. The station sits in the middle of the Mitchell Freeway median strip and is accessed by a bridge.

=== Bus ===
Swan Transit operate the following bus routes from Clarkson station, to all surrounding suburbs.

- 479 Clarkson station to Mindarie Marina – serves Ocean Keys Boulevard, Connolly Drive and Aviator Boulevard
- 483 Clarkson station to Butler station – serves Ocean Keys Boulevard, Key Largo Drive, Lithgow Drive, Renshaw Boulevard and Hester Avenue
- 484 Clarkson Station to Butler station – serves Ocean Keys Boulevard, Connolly Drive and Hester Avenue

Bus routes serving Ocean Keys Boulevard and Marmion Avenue:

- 474 Clarkson station to Joondalup station
- 480 Clarkson station to Quinns Rocks
- 481 and 482 Clarkson station to Butler station

=== Rail ===
- Yanchep Line
  - Clarkson Station

== Politics ==
There is one polling booth in Clarkson, at Clarkson Community High School. Along with its neighbouring suburbs, Clarkson is part of the Mindarie electoral district. At the federal level it was formerly part of the Pearce federal division, but was transferred to Moore, along with Mindarie and Neerabup, as of 2010.

Clarkson has traditionally been an Australian Labor Party stronghold since the early 2000s (decade) in state elections, in line with many northern Perth suburbs. At federal level, the voting is much less clear-cut, with both major parties gaining consecutive election victories in the suburb since 2001.

2010 federal election Source: AEC
Liberal	39.1%
Labor	37.3%
Greens	8.2%
CDP	2%
Family First	1.69%

2007 federal election Source: AEC
Labor	46.2%
Liberal	38.3%
Greens	8.2%
CDP	2%
Family First	1.69%

2004 federal election Source: AEC
Liberal	42.4%
Labor	41.4%
Greens	7.63%
One Nation	2.9%
CDP	2.8%

2001 federal election Source: AEC
Labor	47.5%
Liberal	29.9%
One Nation	7.3%
Greens	7.15%
Democrats	5.1%

2008 state election Source: WAEC
Labor	54%
Liberal	24.3%
Greens	9.1%
Family First	4.8%
CDP	2.2%

2005 state election Source: WAEC
Labor	56.3%
Liberal	25%
Greens	6.2%
Family First	4.2%
CDP	2.5%

2001 state election Source: WAEC
Labor	45.8%
Liberal	26.5%
One Nation	8.6%
Greens	5.9%
Democrats	2.7%
