= Butler, Western Australia =

Butler
- Suburb
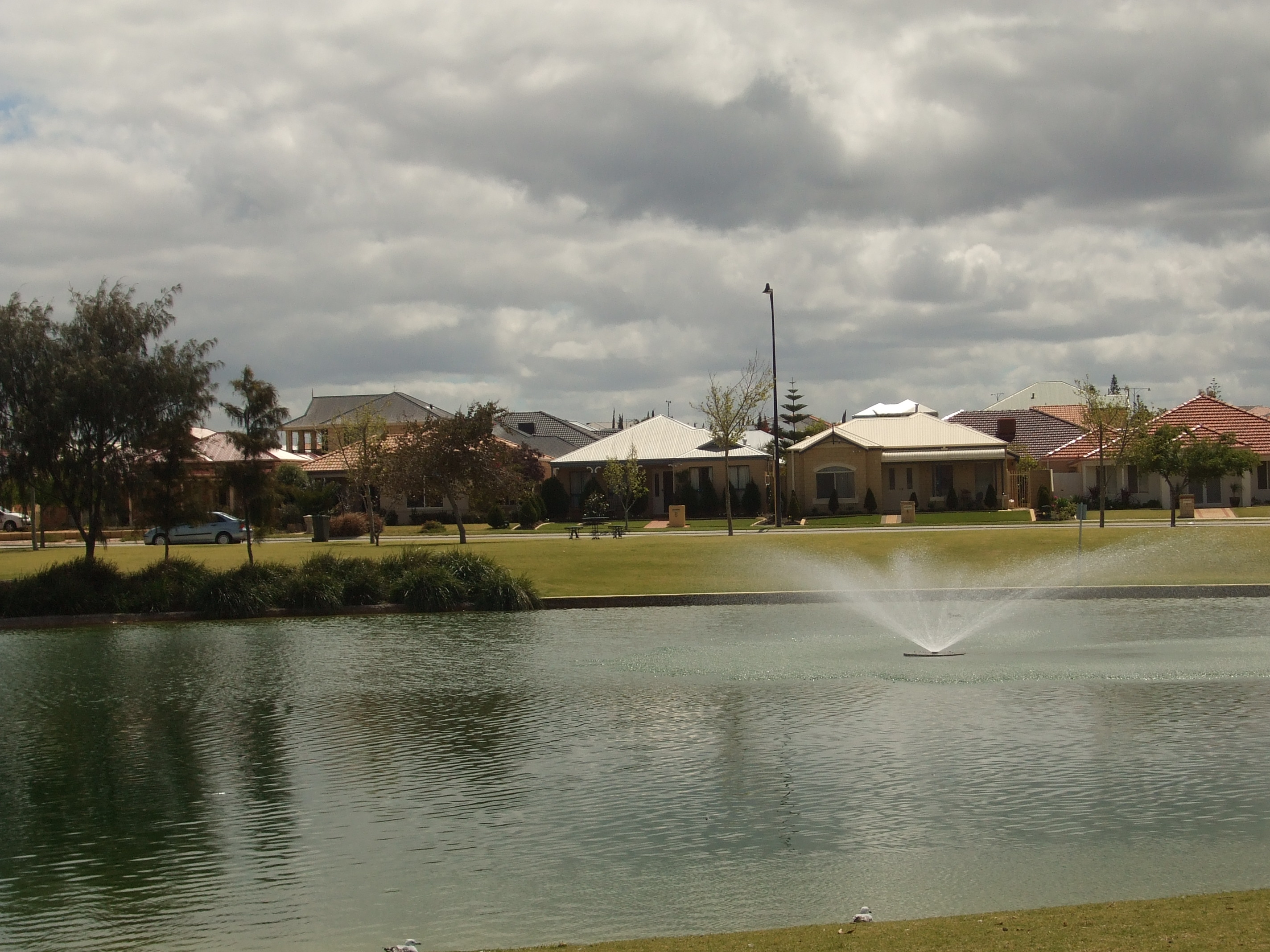
- Brampton Park, Butler
- Interactive map of Butler
- Coordinates: 31.642°S 115.706°E
- Country: Australia
- State: Western Australia
- City: Perth
- LGA: City of Wanneroo
- Location: 41 km (25 mi) NNW of Perth CBD
- Established: 2003

Government
  - State electorate: Butler
  - Federal division: Pearce

Area
  - Total: 5 km^{2} (1.9 sq mi)

Population
  - Total: 13,473 (SAL 2021)
- Postcode: 6036
Suburbs around Butler
Alkimos	Alkimos	Nowergup
Jindalee	Butler	Nowergup
Quinns Rocks	Merriwa; Ridgewood	Nowergup

Butler is an outer suburb of Perth, Western Australia, 41 kilometres north of Perth's central business district. It is part of the City of Wanneroo local government area. It forms the majority of the Brighton Estate, a large commercial and residential development by Satterley.

== Geography ==
Butler is bordered to the west by Jindalee and Quinns Rocks (Marmion Avenue), to the south by Merriwa and Ridgewood (Lukin Drive) and to the north by Alkimos (Butler Boulevard). The Mitchell Freeway separates Butler from the rural locality of Nowergup in the east.

2 kilometres west of Butler is the Indian Ocean.

== History ==
=== Name ===
"Butler" was approved by the Shire of Wanneroo for the area in 1979 in honour of John Butler, the first recorded explorer of the Wanneroo and Lake Joondalup areas in 1834.

The marketing of the "Brighton Estate" in Butler by Satterley, with many amenities and establishments also adopting the "Brighton" nameplate (e.g., Brighton Village Newsagency), has led to Brighton's becoming synonymous with Butler and causing confusion amongst residents and sight-seers alike. Residents submitted a petition to the City of Wanneroo in 2003 for the suburb's name to be permanently changed to Brighton. The request was rejected on account of duplication with many other places across Australia named Brighton, as well as the name's lacking both historical and cultural significance within the area.

=== Suburban development ===
Although Butler was gazetted in 1979, it remained unpopulated bushland until the early 2000s, with no landmarks or conventional roads providing direct access to the area. The Butler-Ridgewood Agreed Local Structure Plan was approved by the City of Wanneroo in 2002, allowing early subdivision and development of the site to commence in 2003 by Satterley, the principal investor in the suburb.

Satterley's Brighton Estate plan takes up all of Butler and also extends into the neighbouring suburbs of Ridgewood, Jindalee and Alkimos. Butler contains four sub-divisional estates within the Brighton area; "The Dunes", "The Green", "Seahaven" and "Junctions North". Over $120 million was spent on landscaping, civil construction and community infrastructure to create the Seahaven and The Green estates, the Brighton Village Shopping Centre on Marmion Avenue and the Central Park Precinct.

== Demographics ==
Historical population
Year	Pop.	±%
2001	0	—
2006	5,056	—
2011	9,653	+90.9%
2016	13,278	+37.6%

At the 2006 census, Butler had a population of 5,056. This represents a huge increase, as Butler's population was negligible during the 2001 census five years earlier. The population is predicted to continue growing at a remarkable rate, peaking at 12,903 in 2016. Only 53.4% of Butler's population were born in Australia, with 25.4% born in the United Kingdom, a proportion in between the nearby suburbs of Mindarie (31.27%) and Quinns Rocks (19.7%).

The average age of Butler's residents is 28, a very young population compared to the Australian national average of 37. Income levels are also substantially above the national average, with a median household income of $1,205 per week, compared to $1,027 per week nationally. 49.8% declared a denomination of Christianity as their religion, with Anglicanism being the most popular at 24.3%. Butler contains one church, Kingdomcity. 26.6% of the population declared no religion.

== Amenities and facilities ==
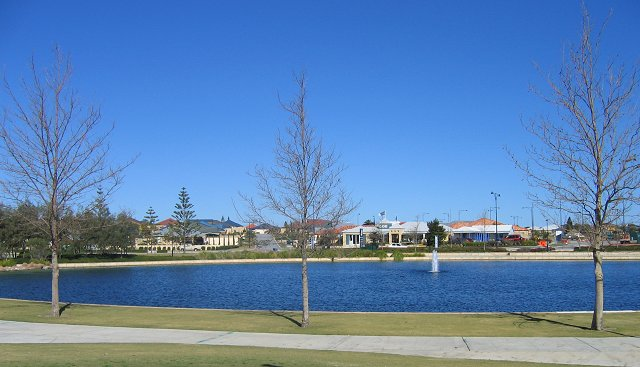
Kingsbridge Park, Butler

Butler was established by the Department of Planning as a "district centre" in their Directions 2031 urban expansion plan, highlighting it as a centre for commercial activity and public services, secondary to the nearby town centres of Clarkson and Alkimos.

Kingsbridge Boulevard, one of the core distributor roads through Butler, contains a strip of shops, banks and public services, as well as a large Coles supermarket. Along this stretch is also a pub, The Cornerstone Tavern, opened in 2010, which provides nightlife and entertainment functions for the whole area from Butler to Jindalee. Most of Butler's amenities are located at the western edge of the area, adjacent to Marmion Avenue, while eastern Butler remains strictly residential in character.

Butler contains several parks in various places throughout the area, including a strip of parkland running all the way down Kingsbridge Boulevard. The Butler Community Centre is located in south Butler.

== Education ==
Butler contains three state K-6 primary schools, Butler Primary School, East Butler Primary School and John Butler Primary College. The one state high school is Butler College.

Butler students also have the option of Christian education. St Francis of Assisi Catholic Primary School serves students from K-6, while the large Irene McCormack Catholic College accommodates Years 7–12. Both schools are privately funded.

== Transport ==
The Mitchell Freeway forms the eastern boundary of the suburb, with an interchange at Butler Boulevard. At the western edge of the suburb, Marmion Avenue connects Butler to the far outer suburb of Yanchep in the north. Connolly Drive also terminates at Butler, and runs parallel to Marmion Avenue into Clarkson, Kinross and Currambine.

=== Public transport ===
The Butler railway station on the Joondalup line was opened in 2014 in northern Butler and is currently the terminus of the line. This station provides a rail link to Joondalup and onwards to Perth and Mandurah. Butler station is also served by six bus routes, three of which run south through Butler to terminate at Clarkson station

==== Bus ====
- 483 Butler Station to Clarkson Station – serves Butler Boulevard, Camborne Parkway, Kingsbridge Boulevard, Shropshire Crescent and Bradman Drive
- 484 Butler Station to Clarkson Station – serves Butler Boulevard, Landbeach Boulevard and Shepperton Drive
- 487 Butler Station to Alkimos (Trinity Estate) – serves Mansfield Avenue, Camborne Parkway and Hollington Boulevard
- 488 Butler Station to Alkimos (Trinity Estate) – serves Butler Boulevard and Benenden Avenue

Bus routes serving Butler Boulevard and Marmion Avenue:

- 481 and 482 Butler Station to Clarkson Station
- 486 Butler Station to Alkimos Station

==== Rail ====
- Yanchep Line
  - Butler Station

== Politics ==
Butler is part of the electoral district of Mindarie and the federal Division of Pearce. Residents of Butler first began voting at the Butler Primary School polling booth at the 2004 federal election.

Like many neighbouring "mortgage belt" suburbs, there is a strong trend for residents to vote Australian Labor Party at state level, while voting Liberal at federal level.

2010 federal election Source: AEC
Liberal	46.4%
Labor	33.3%
Greens	13.9%
Family First	3.5%
CDP	1.4%

2007 federal election Source: AEC
Liberal	48.6%
Labor	38%
Greens	7.3%
CDP	2.2%
Independent	1.5%

2004 federal election Source: AEC
Liberal	53.2%
Labor	32%
Greens	7.3%
CDP	2.6%
Democrats	1.8%

2008 state election Source: WAEC
Labor	51%
Liberal	31.6%
Greens	8.3%
CDP	2.6%
Family First	1.7%

2005 state election Source: WAEC
Labor	51.7%
Liberal	29.6%
Greens	3.8%
Family First	3.1%
Independent	3.1%
