= Ocean Keys =

Ocean Keys Shopping Centre

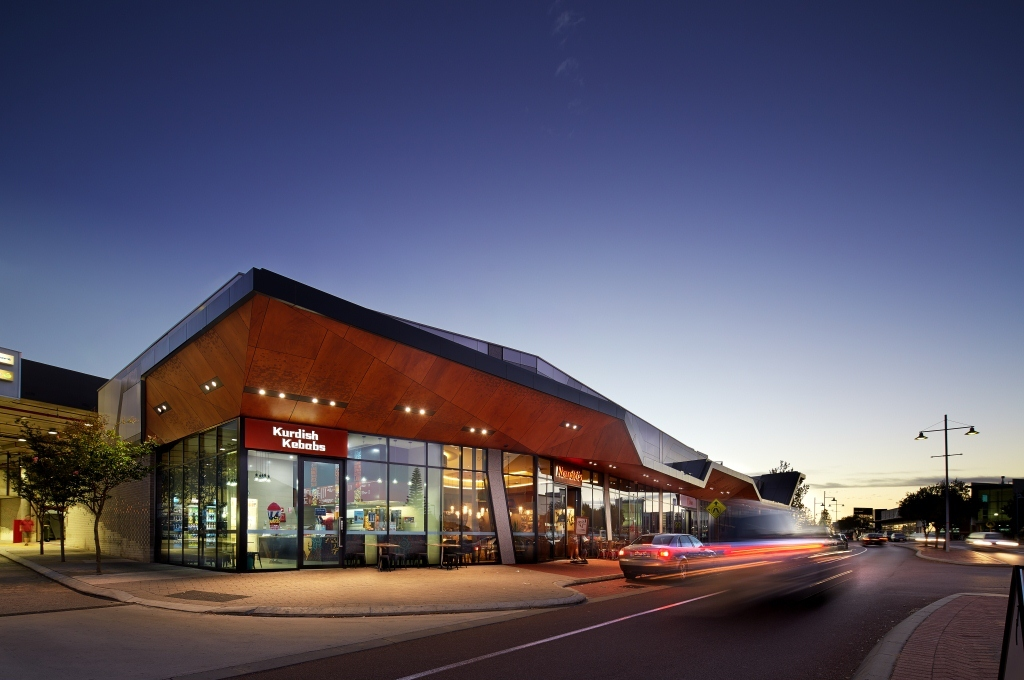
- Location: Clarkson, Western Australia, Australia
- Coordinates: 31°41′28″S 115°43′04″E
- Manager: Dexus
- Owner: Dexus
- Num. of stores: 120
- Num. of anchor tenants: 4
- Floor area: 39,000 m^{2} (420,000 sq ft)
- Floors: 1
- Parking: 1,579
- Website: Official website

Ocean Keys Shopping Centre is a shopping centre located in the Perth suburb of Clarkson, approximately 35 kilometres (22 mi) from Perth CBD, in Western Australia. Ocean Keys has over 120 stores, including Coles, Kmart, City Beach, and JB Hi-Fi.

Ocean Keys is owned and managed by Dexus.

== History and development ==
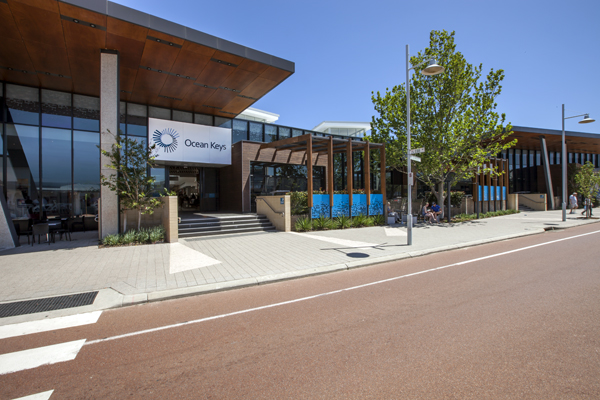
Ocean Keys Shopping Centre main entry off Ocean Keys Boulevard, Clarkson

The centre is owned and managed by AMP Capital and was last redeveloped in 2014, where the centre doubled in size to approximately 39,000 m^{2} (420,000 sq ft).

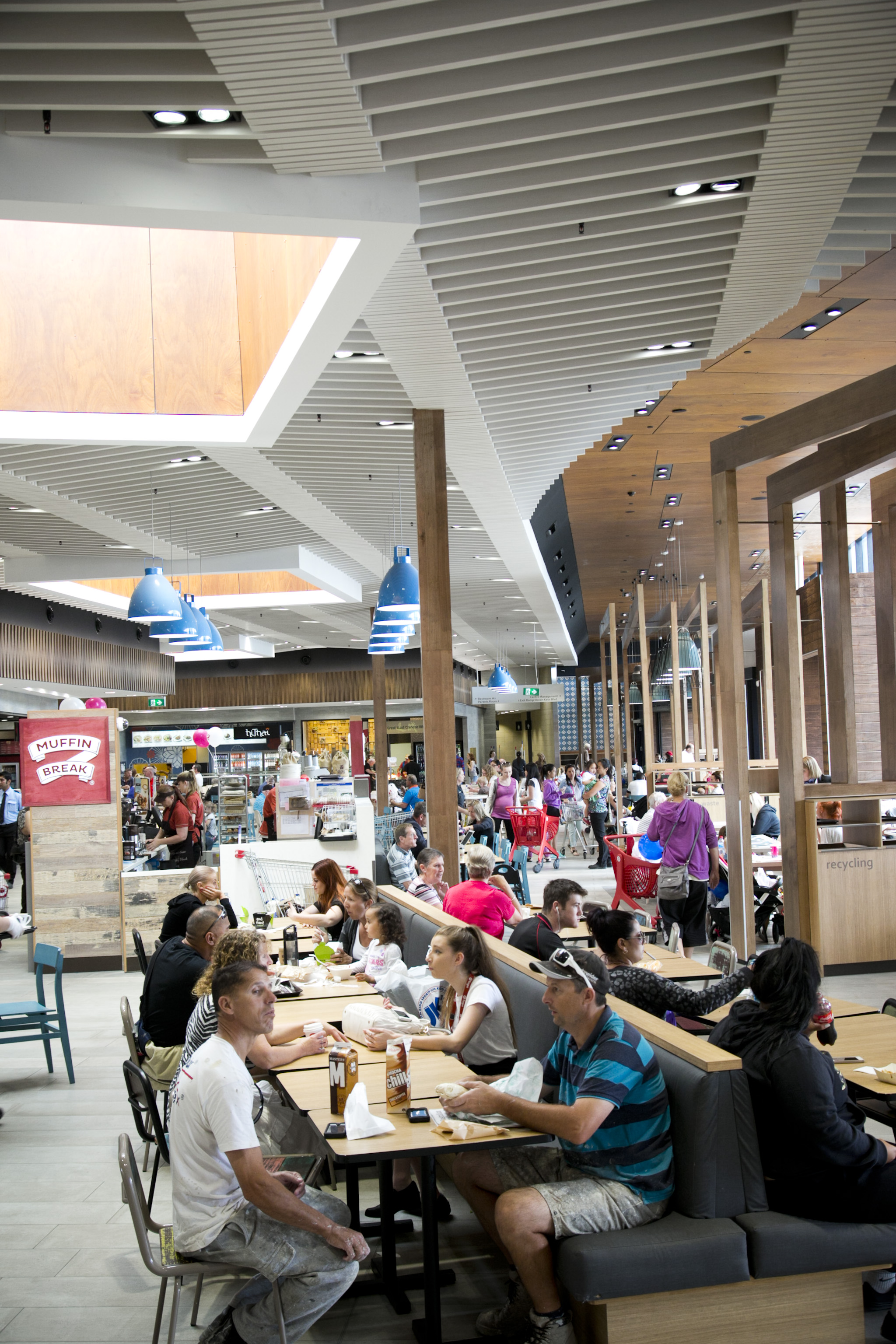
Food court at Ocean Keys

Stage 1 of the centre opened on 25 June 2001, consisting of two supermarkets (Coles & Newmart) and 35 speciality stores.

Stage 2 extension of the centre opened in October 2005 introducing Kmart and an additional 42 speciality shops.

In 2006, AMP Capital Shopping Centres commenced management of the centre.

Construction of the Stage 4 development commenced in April 2007 and was completed in November of the same year. This project consisted of a further extension of the Woolworths supermarket, and a second travelator at the western entrance leading to the undercover car park and Shell Express Service Station, increasing the centre's GLA to 22,800 m^{2} (245,000 sq ft).

Construction commenced on the Stage 5 development in January 2013 to increase the centre GLA to 39,000 m^{2} (420,000 sq ft) through the addition of Target, approximately 50 new speciality stores and a new three level car park across a two-year program.

The redevelopment was completed in two stages in 2014 – Stage 1 opened on 20 March 2014 and Stage 2 opened on 6 November 2014.

After 6 years, in October 2020, Target closed down and was shortly replaced temporarily by a second Kmart store, however, this was until August 2021.

== Architectural features ==
The architectural design of the redevelopment was informed by both its history and surroundings. Themes from the original pre-developed shopping centre were refreshed, with the replication of motifs from the artificial environment at the nearby Mindarie Marina. The colour palette is light and clean, with a focus on blue hues and shades of white, with measured use of natural and tactile materials. The redevelopment won the Commercial Architecture prize at the Australian Institute of Architects (WA chapter) awards in 2015.
