= Merriwa, Western Australia =

Merriwa
- Suburb
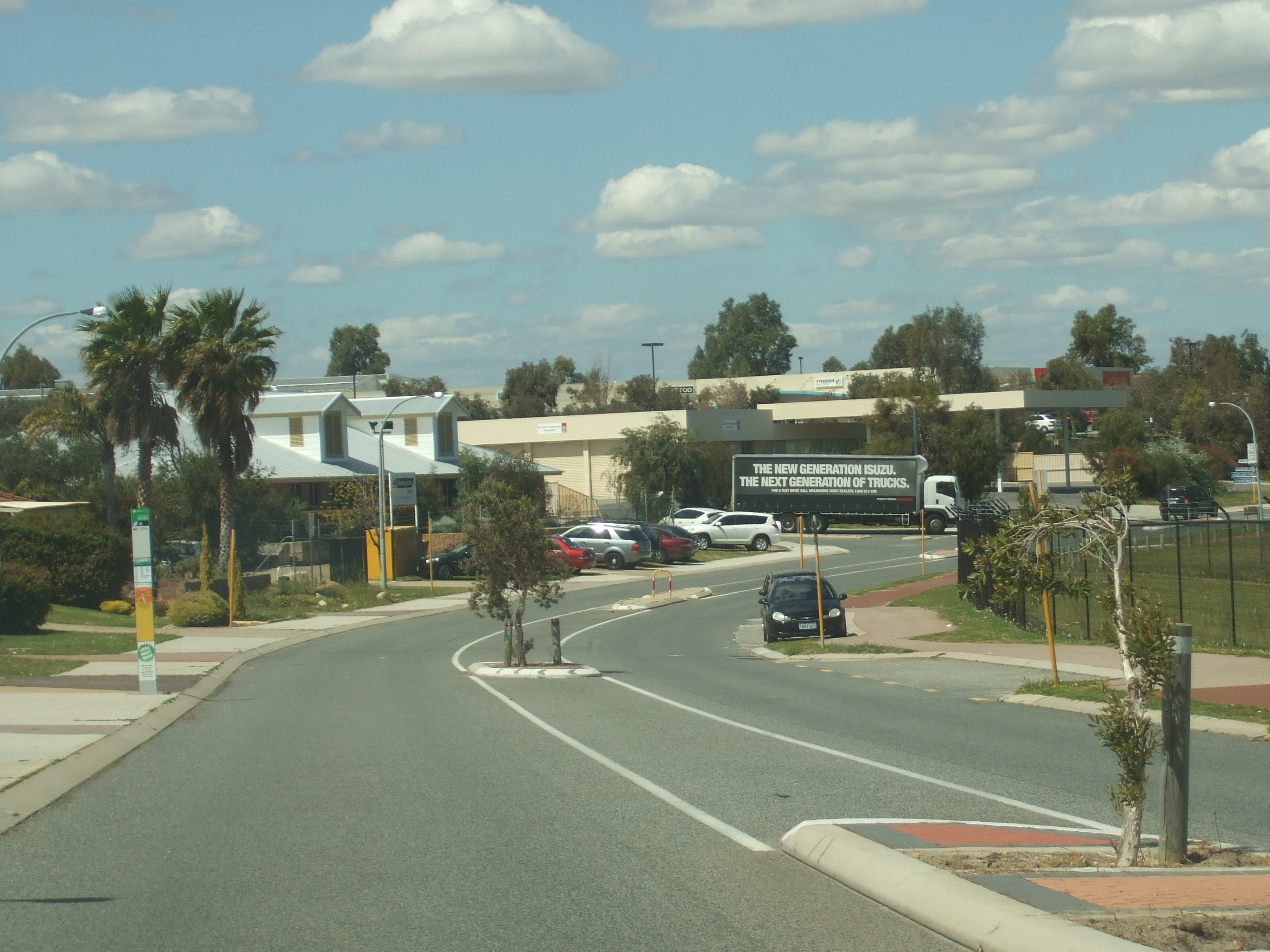
- Baltimore Parade and the Merriwa Plaza
- Interactive map of Merriwa
- Coordinates: 31.666°S 115.718°E
- Country: Australia
- State: Western Australia
- City: Perth
- LGA: City of Wanneroo
- Location: 36 km (22 mi) from Perth City
- Established: 1980s

Government
  - State electorate: Mindarie
  - Federal division: Pearce

Area
  - Total: 2.3 km^{2} (0.89 sq mi)

Population
  - Total: 5,587 (SAL 2021)
- Postcode: 6030
Suburbs around Merriwa
Quinns Rocks	Butler	Butler
Quinns Rocks	Merriwa	Ridgewood
Mindarie	Clarkson	Clarkson

Merriwa is a coastal, northern suburb of Perth, Western Australia, 36 kilometres (22 mi) north of the central business district. It is part of the City of Wanneroo local government area. It is a predominantly residential suburb, containing two RAAF retirement villages.

== History ==
=== Name ===
The name "Hester" was originally approved for the suburb by the Shire of Wanneroo in 1980, after Thomas Hester, one of the first land owners in the vicinity. The neighbouring suburbs of Clarkson and Butler were also named this way. However, the name was opposed by Australia Post due to conflict with the existing town of Hester in south-west WA. "Merriwa", an Aboriginal word meaning "a good place", was then proposed and approved for the area within the same year. The original name survives in Hester Avenue, an east-west arterial road that forms the southern boundary of the suburb.

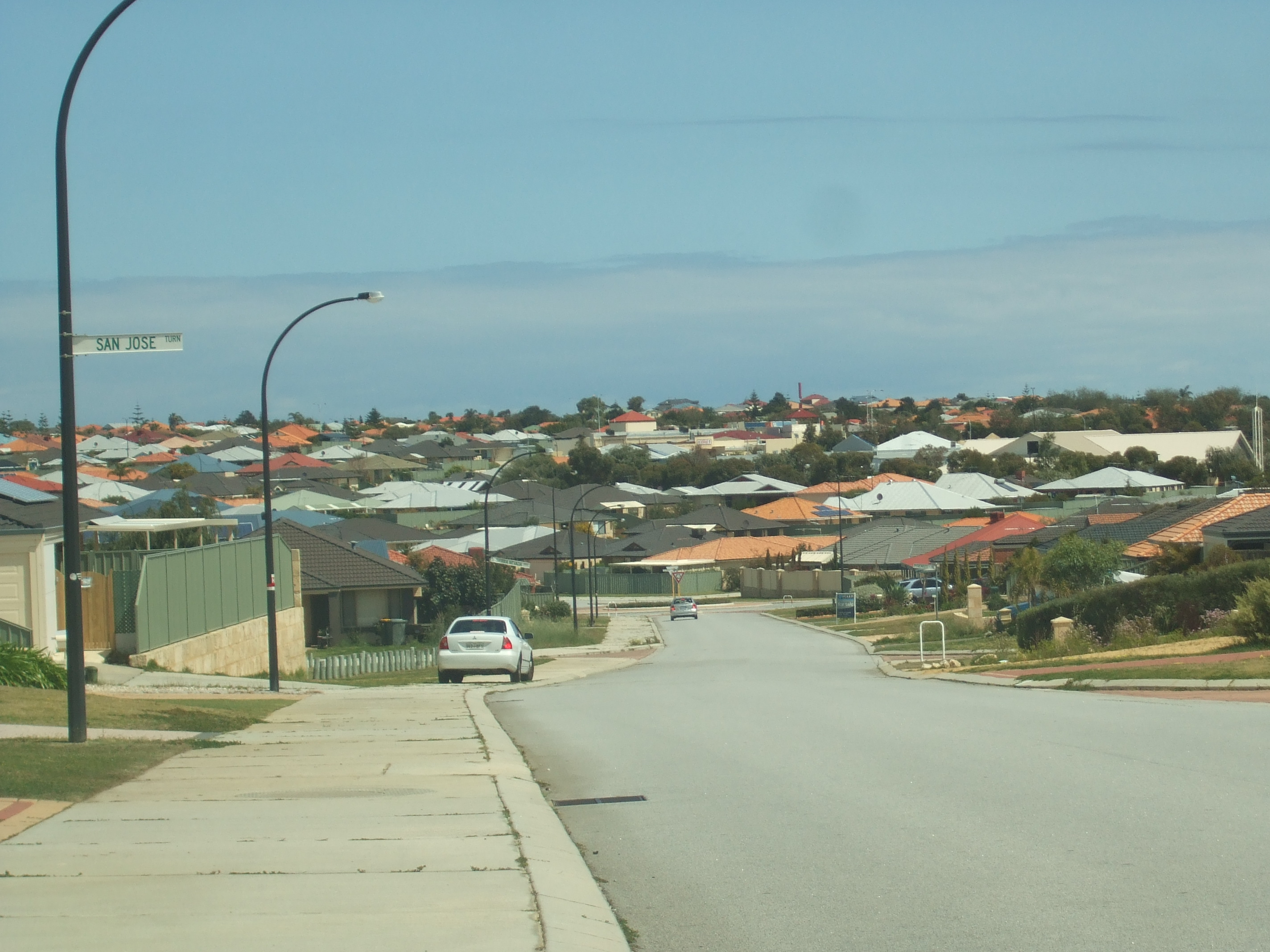
View westwards along Seagrove Boulevard.

=== Suburban development ===
Up until the late 1980s, Merriwa was unpopulated bushland with no notable land features other than Quinns Road, a two-lane arterial road linking the adjacent townsite of Quinns Rocks to Wanneroo Road. The original Quinns Beach Estate in the south of Merriwa was developed in the late 1980s and early 1990s by Smith Corporation, who were also responsible for the development of the marina in nearby Mindarie at the time. Many early residents of Merriwa suffered from lack of facilities, poorly built pavements and roads, lack of street-lighting, and isolation from other areas (as Marmion Avenue had not yet been extended). This led to the formation of the Merriwa Development Committee, with the purpose of lobbying the Council to support the issues raised.

Carnegie Private Estate was built in the mid 1990s in the area east of Connolly Drive by Town and Country Bank. In 1998, Merriwa was bifurcated along Connolly Drive by the City of Wanneroo, and the eastern half, including the Carnegie Estate, was gazetted as the new suburb of Ridgewood.

Seagrove Estate in the north was built in the early 2000s by Caversham Property, and is delineated from the Quinns Beach Estate by Grand Paradiso Parade and Seagrove Boulevard. This development was also supported by a "Merriwa Structure Plan" devised by the City of Wanneroo, to provide adequate services and public open space for residents of the area.

Two RAAFA retirement villages, Merriwa Estate and Cambrai Village, are also located in the northern and southern extremes of the suburb.

== Geography ==
Merriwa is bounded by Butler to the north (Lukin Drive), Ridgewood to the east (Connolly Drive), Quinns Rocks and Mindarie to the west (Marmion Avenue) and Clarkson to the south (Hester Avenue). The suburb was originally much larger, extending to the Yanchep line reserve in the east, but was split in two in 1998.

It is 2 kilometres (1.2 mi) from Quinns Beach and the Indian Ocean to the west.

== Demographics ==
Merriwa had a population of 5,220 at the 2006 Australian census, an increase of 1,167 since the 2001 census. However, the suburb's population is predicted to remain stable in the future. Although Merriwa's 64.2% Australian-born population is below the national average of 70.9%, it is still significantly higher than the adjoining suburbs, which have significantly higher British-born populations, of which Merriwa's is 14.2%. The median age of Merriwa's residents is 33, compared to the national Australian average of 37. Median incomes in the area were considerably below the Australian average, with an average household income of $808 per week, compared to $1,027 nationally.

The most declared religion in the suburb is Christianity, comprising 48.6% of the population across various denominations. However, more residents declared no religion (26.8%) than they did for the most declared Christian denomination, Anglicanism (23.3%.) There is one Pentecostal church, One Church, located in the Seagrove area of the suburb.

== Amenities and facilities ==
Merriwa is primarily residential, but does contain some shopping and retail facilities. It relies on Clarkson and the nearby regional city of Joondalup for most other commercial and public services. The Merriwa Plaza, within the Quinns Beach Estate area, accommodates a large supermarket branch along with several other small shops and take-away restaurants.

Six large parks are scattered throughout the suburb, many with additional sporting facilities. Addison Park features clubrooms and a function hall, while Dalvik Park leads onto the Alkimos Baptist College campus. Also nearby is the Jenolan Way Community Centre that is used for its function rooms and offices.

Brighton Beach Medical Centre in northern Merriwa provides medical services to the suburb's residents. Within the vicinity is a St John ambulance station, opened in 2008. The station operates 24 hours a day and serves all surrounding suburbs from Kinross to Butler.

Telephone services are provided by the Quinns Rocks telephone exchange.

== Education ==
Merriwa contains one primary school, Merriwa Primary School, catering for Kindergarten to Year 6. Located on the same campus is the Merriwa Education Support Centre, specializing in education for intellectually disabled children. Senior Merriwa students from Year 7 onwards fall into the Clarkson Community High School catchment area.

A private school is also located on Dalvik Park in the centre of the suburb, which was known as Kingsway Christian College up until 2007 when it closed down. The campus remained vacant for the next three years until re-opening as Alkimos Baptist College, a private Baptist primary school for children from Kindergarten to Year 8. The staff and students of the college are expected to eventually move to a brand new, purpose-built facility in Alkimos in the future.

== Transport ==
=== Roads ===
Merriwa is linked by road to Perth by Marmion Avenue and Connolly Drive, two parallel arterial roads that run along Merriwa's western and eastern boundaries respectively. Hester Avenue on the southern edge of Merriwa also links directly to the Mitchell Freeway and Wanneroo Road in the east. Lukin Drive runs along the northern boundary, which will connect to the Mitchell Freeway when the extension to Romeo Road is complete.

There is one backbone road, Baltimore Parade, that cuts through the middle of Merriwa from north to south and links the whole suburb together. The road originally looped westwards onto Marmion Avenue, but was re-aligned during the development of the Seagrove Estate to exit north onto Lukin Drive instead. The old alignment of the road was renamed Hughie Edwards Drive.

=== Public transport ===
Merriwa is between the Clarkson Station to the south, and Butler Station to the north, with roughly equal distance to both stations. These stations provide a rail link to the Joondalup CBD, and then the Perth CBD via the Yanchep line.

==== Bus ====
- 481 and 482 Clarkson Station to Butler Station – serve Marmion Avenue
- 483 Clarkson Station to Butler Station – serves Hester Avenue and Baltimore Parade

== Politics ==
Merriwa contains one polling booth at Merriwa Primary School. There is a strong trend for Merriwa residents to vote for the Australian Labor Party at state level and the Liberal Party at federal level, in line with other "mortgage belt" suburbs in the area, such as Clarkson. The Family First Party is also generally preferred over the Christian Democratic Party at minority level.

Merriwa was historically part of the Electoral district of Wanneroo before becoming a member of Mindarie at the 2003 redistribution. It also forms the southern boundary of the federal Division of Pearce.

2010 federal election Source: AEC
Liberal	44.6%
Labor	38.5%
Greens	11.3%
Family First	2.4%
CDP	1.7%

2007 federal election Source: AEC
Liberal	44.3%
Labor	42.8%
Greens	5.7%
Family First	1.8%
CDP	1.4%

2004 federal election Source: AEC
Liberal	49.4%
Labor	36.3%
Greens	5.3%
CDP	3.4%
One Nation	2.7%

2001 federal election Source: AEC
Liberal	38%
Labor	37.8%
One Nation	6.4%
Greens	5%
Democrats	3.7%

2008 state election Source: WAEC
Labor	46.9%
Liberal	32.3%
Greens	9.5%
Family First	3.2%
CDP	1.6%

2005 state election Source: WAEC
Labor	46.8%
Liberal	31.6%
Greens	4%
Family First	3.4%
One Nation	2.1%

2001 state election Source: WAEC
Labor	39.9%
Liberal	31.1%
One Nation	10.6%
Greens	5.7%
Democrats	2.6%
