= Quinns Rocks, Western Australia =

Quinns Rocks
- Suburb
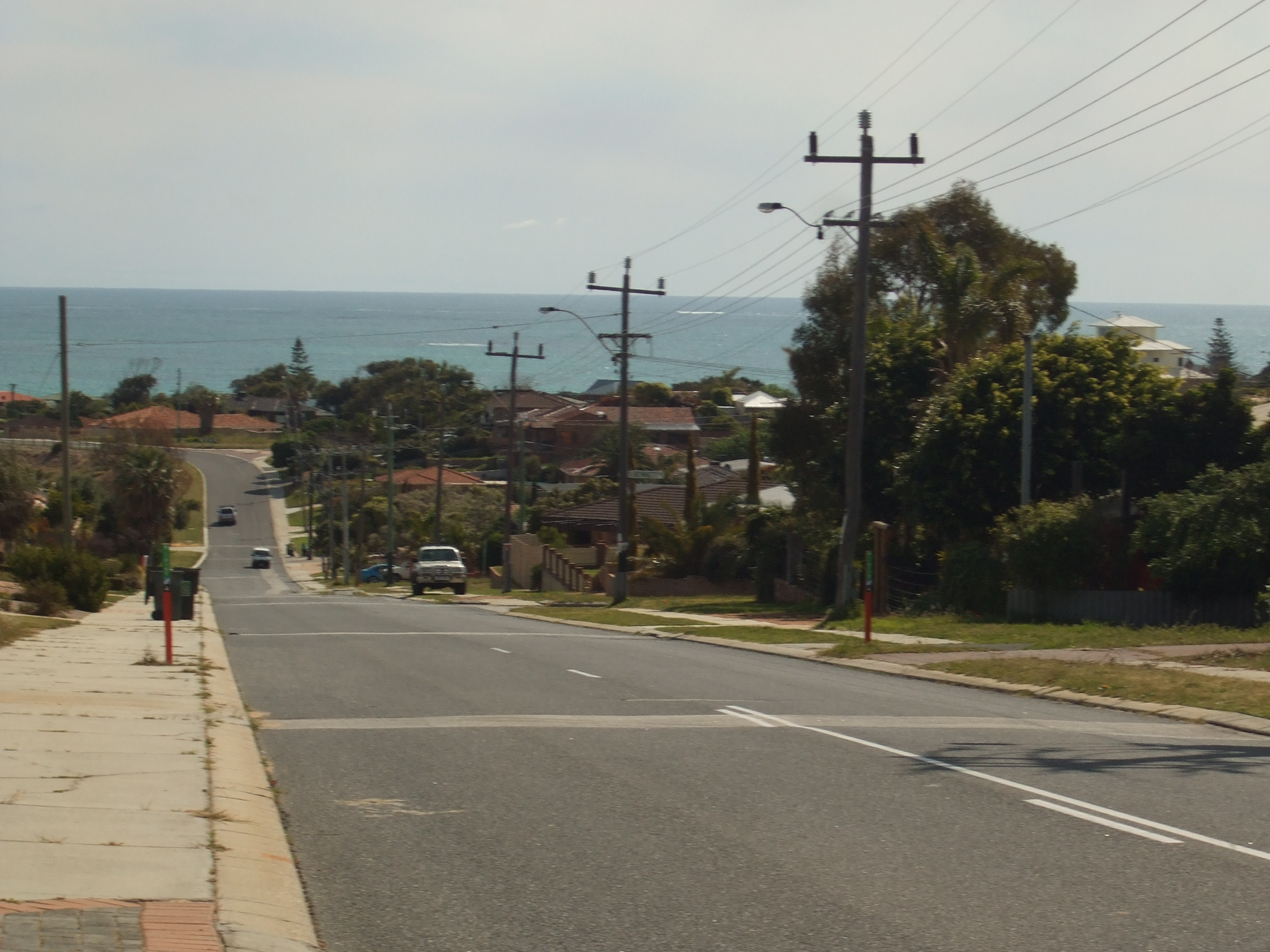
- Quinns Road, heading towards the Indian Ocean
- Interactive map of Quinns Rocks
- Coordinates: 31.671°S 115.698°E
- Country: Australia
- State: Western Australia
- City: Perth
- LGA: City of Wanneroo
- Location: 38 km (24 mi) NNW of Perth
- Established: 1962

Government
  - State electorate: Burns Beach
  - Federal division: Pearce

Area
  - Total: 3.84 km^{2} (1.48 sq mi)

Population
  - Total: 8,861 (SAL 2021)
- Postcode: 6030
Suburbs around Quinns Rocks
	Jindalee	Butler
Indian Ocean	Quinns Rocks	Merriwa
	Mindarie	Clarkson

Quinns Rocks is an outer coastal suburb of Perth, Western Australia, located 38 kilometres (24 mi) north of Perth's central business district. It is part of the City of Wanneroo local government area. The suburb was formally established in 1962 as a rural townsite, focused around Quinns Beach, the area's main amenity.

== Geography ==
Quinns Rocks is bounded by Mindarie to the south (Quinns Road), Merriwa and Butler to the east (Marmion Avenue) and Jindalee to the north (Hampshire Drive). To the west is the Indian Ocean and the coastline of Quinns Beach, which straddles the whole length of the suburb.

== History ==
=== Name ===
The suburb takes its name from the offshore reef first noted during a coastline traverse by Assistant Surveyor James Cowle in 1867. Cowle was continuing a survey begun by Robert Quin, who had reached a spot about 4 kilometres (2.5 mi) south-east of the rocks in 1866. Although the modern-day name is spelt with a double "n", the rocks are thought to have been named after Quin, who emigrated to Western Australia in 1863, where he was appointed as an Assistant Surveyor on his arrival. He occupied this position for 22 years, carrying out most of his surveys in the Gingin-Moore River area, until his death in July 1886. The general area on the coast opposite the rocks was referred to as Quinns Rocks by the Wanneroo Road Board when they requested the survey of a road that led there in November 1925. Later, the place also came to be called "Wanneroo Beach".

An alternate namesake is Mick Quinn, a sheep tender who worked for the Mindarie Pastoral Company in the early 1900s.

=== Residential development ===
In 1930, the whole beachfront came under the control of the Wanneroo Road Board, which issued "boatshed and campsite permits" to holidaymakers at a rental of $4.20 per annum. Early shack owners were restricted to no more than 48 hours in their shacks at one time without further permission from the Road Board. The first permanent residents appear to have been in 1942. The caravan park was built at the south end here in 1946. Mr L.G. Leppinus, formerly of Merredin, was one of the seven original shack owners at this site; he had to move his shack three times because of extensive erosion. Shack owners put down their own bores and usually ran on pan system toilets. During the 1950s, an increasing number of shacks lined the ocean front. Leasing of the beachfront reserve was phased out towards the end of that decade. Shack owners were told they had to remove their shacks, but were given first right of refusal for blocks on the ocean front - the going rate was approximately 400 pounds (A$800).

In 1958, Lot 223 was purchased and subdivided the following year. Four applications to build were approved in March 1959 and a major sale on 10 June saw nearly 300 blocks purchased. The subdivision was extended northwards in the early 1960s and Quinns Rocks was declared a townsite under the Local Government Act on 27 July 1962. Further extensions took place in 1964 and 1972. The locality encompassing this local government townsite, gazetted as "Quinns" in 1974 for future postal services, was changed to Quinns Rocks in 1977, so as to coincide with the townsite name.

The beachfront area comprising the original townsite of Quinns, up until the 1990s, is colloquially known as "Old Quinns". The area is characterized by rolling hills and roads, overhead power lines on wooden poles, few pavements and many unique houses with distinct architectural designs dating from the 1960s and 1970s. Most of this area still relies on septic tanks for waste management rather than a linked sewerage system, although infill sewerage works are scheduled in future.

Norfolk Estate was built in Quinns Rocks much later in the early 1990s in the area east of Tapping Way. It is distinguished from "Old Quinns" by underground power lines, cul-de-sac street systems and modern bungalow housing. The estate also contains a higher concentration of public housing.

The final part of Quinns, known simply as "Quinns Beach", was the last portion of the area to be developed, and borders Jindalee in the north.

== Demographics ==
Quinns Rocks had a population of 7,991 at the 2006 census, an increase of over 1,988 residents since the 2001 census. The population is predicted to continue growing in the future, albeit at a slow pace. Only 57.7% of Quinns Rocks residents were born in Australia, compared to 70.9% nationally. All major immigrant groups in Quinns are from Anglophone countries (e.g. United Kingdom, South Africa, New Zealand) with 19.7% of the population born in the UK, a roughly averarage proportion compared to the nearby suburbs.

Quinns residents are generally young, with a median age of 31 compared to 37 nationally. Income levels are also substantially above the national average, with an average household income of $1,245 per week, compared to $1,171 per week nationally.

47.3% of residents identified as Christian, through various Christian denominations, the most populous being Anglicanism at 24.2%. Two churches in southern Quinns serve the Christian population: the Anglican Church of Australia and Northside Baptist Church. 26.7% declared no religion.

== Amenities and facilities ==
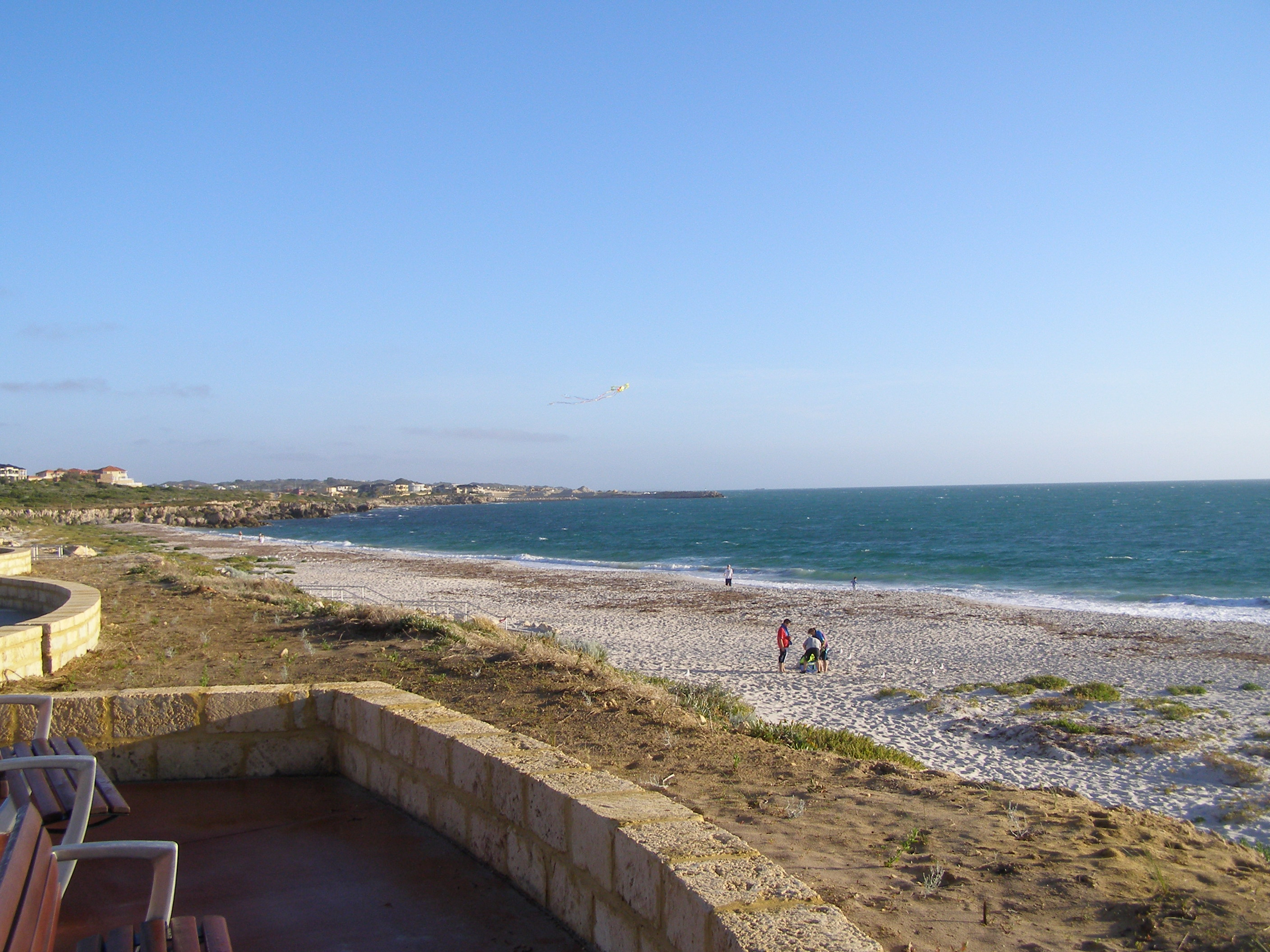
Quinns Beach, looking south onto Mindarie

The major attraction of Quinns Rocks is Quinns Beach, which spans the entire western boundary of the suburb along Ocean Drive, one of the area's main backbone roads. The beach contains barbecue facilities and children's play areas for families, as well as a dedicated dog beach further north (approximately 950 metres), for dog-walkers. A beachside cafe and bottle shop are situated on Ocean Drive. The beach is also home to the clubrooms of the Quinns Mindarie Surf Lifesaving Club, who have patrolled the beach since the club's foundation in 1982.

There are over ten large parks and reserves scattered throughout Quinns Rocks. Many of these parks share an abundance of sporting facilities for residents, such as the Quinns Rocks Bowling Club, the Quinns Rocks Skate Park and the Gumblossom Tennis Courts. The tennis courts are located at Gumblossom Park, the site of the Gumblossom Community Centre, which provides for most community functions and gatherings in the suburb.

Quinns Rocks is largely residential, relying on Clarkson and the nearby city of Joondalup for major commercial and public services. Nonetheless, it does have the Quinns Village Shopping Centre, a small shopping precinct in the south-east. Located here is an IGA supermarket, serving as the suburb's main shopping centre for groceries, as well as a licensed post office and newsagent, a pharmacy, a bottleshop and a petrol station.

A majority of the area's telephone services are provided by the Quinns Rocks telephone exchange, located in the extreme south of the suburb along Quinns Road. The remaining one-third of houses in the suburb's north are provided for by the Jindalee telephone exchange, located in adjacent suburb Butler to the north-east on Marmion Avenue.

== Education ==
Quinns Rocks contains two K-6 primary schools - Quinns Rocks Primary School and Quinns Beach Primary School, located in the southern and northern extremes of the suburb respectively. Senior Quinns Rocks students fall into Clarkson Community High School, Butler College and Kinross High School catchment area.

There are a number of other senior colleges in close proximity to the area for Quinns students, including Mindarie Senior College, Peter Moyes Anglican Community School and Quinns Baptist College, which all straddle the Mindarie-Quinns southern boundary.

== Transport ==
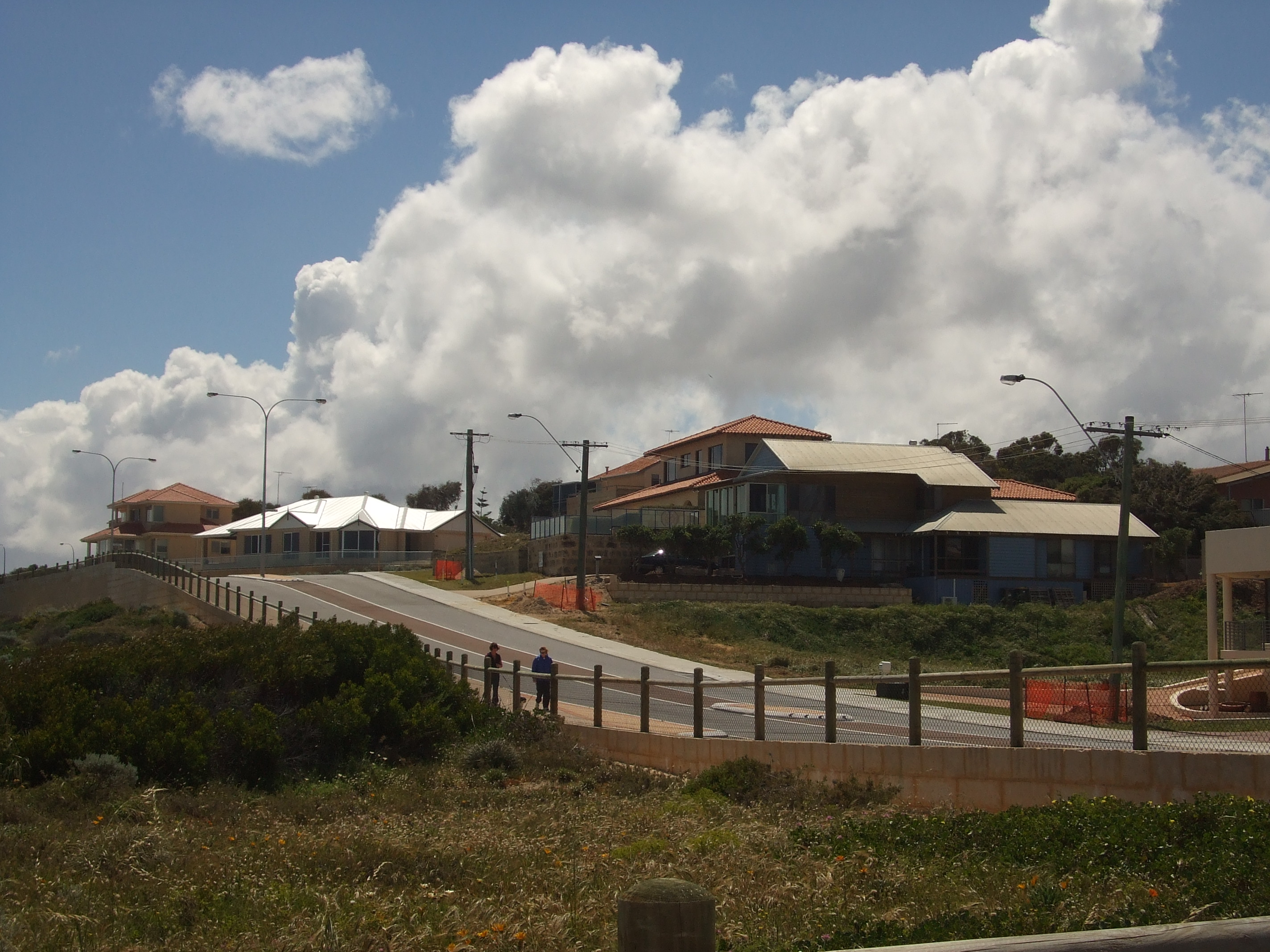
Ocean Drive

Quinns Rocks is serviced by road through Marmion Avenue, a major north-south arterial road linking the suburb to the rest of the Perth metropolitan area to the south, as well as the far outer suburb of Yanchep in the north. Quinns Road formerly linked the suburb directly to Wanneroo Road in the east, but the road east of Quinns Rocks was split and realigned as Hester Avenue.

There are three main, backbone distributor roads throughout Quinns. Quinns Road/Ocean Drive follows the entire southern and western perimeter of the suburb along the coastline. Tapping Way broadly divides Old Quinns and the Norfolk Estate in an approximately south-eastern to north-western manner, while Santa Barbara Parade strictly serves the eastern, inland part of the suburb.

=== Public transport ===
Clarkson railway station serves as the nearest major transport hub to Quinns, providing rail links to Joondalup and Perth's central business district. Two bus routes serve the area, running from Clarkson station through to different parts of Quinns.

- 481 - Clarkson to Quinns Rocks (south) via Mindarie
- 482 - Clarkson to Quinns Rocks (north) via Mindarie

== Politics ==
Quinns Rocks has one polling booth at Quinns Rocks Primary School. There were initially two polling booths in the area, at Gumblossom Community Centre and Quinns Beach Primary School, but these were amalgamated into one for the 2008 state election. The suburb was formerly part of the electoral district of Wanneroo before becoming a member of Mindarie at the 2003 redistribution. It also forms the southern boundary of the federal Division of Pearce.

Like many neighbouring "mortgage belt" suburbs, Quinns residents support the Australian Labor Party at state level, while voting for the Liberal Party at federal level. The Liberal Party has consistently enjoyed a margin of approximately 20% more votes than the ALP at federal elections since 2004. A characteristic of residents' votes in Quinns is their support for The Greens, which has been constantly increasing at each election.

2010 federal election Source: AEC
Liberal	49.6%
Labor	30.2%
Greens	14.1%
CDP	2.7%
Family First	1.7%

2007 federal election Source: AEC
Liberal	51.1%
Labor	33.5%
Greens	9.2%
CDP	1.7%
Family First	1.2%

2004 federal election Source: AEC
Liberal	51.6%
Labor	31.7%
Greens	8.2%
One Nation	3%
CDP	2.9%

2001 federal election Source: AEC
Liberal	40.9%
Labor	34%
Greens	7.6%
One Nation	6.8%
Democrats	4.2%

2008 state election Source: WAEC
Labor	44.9%
Liberal	33.7%
Greens	11.4%
Family First	2.7%
CDP	1.8%

2005 state election Source: WAEC
Labor	46.8%
Liberal	31.6%
Greens	4%
Family First	3.4%
One Nation	2.1%

2001 state election Source: WAEC
Labor	38.6%
Liberal	31.2%
One Nation	9.1%
Greens	7.6%
Democrats	3.5%
