= Mindarie Senior College =

School in Perth, Western Australia

Location
- Mindarie; Australia; 31°40′39″S 115°42′23″E

Information
- Type: Independent public co-educational senior high day school
- Motto: Where Your Future Begins
- Established: 2003; 23 years ago
- Educational authority: WA Department of Education
- Principal: Jonathan Bromage
- Years: 11–12
- Enrolment: 736 (2022 Semester 1)
- Campus type: Suburban
- Colours: Powder blue and navy blue
- Website: www.mindarie.wa.edu.au

Mindarie Senior College is an independent public senior high school, located in the Perth outer northern suburb of Mindarie, Western Australia.

Established in 2003, the school provides an education for students in Year 11 and Year 12.

== Overview ==
Flexible hours offer students the ability to experience learning through placements at University, TAFE, or in the workforce. The college offers a wide choice of courses for those aiming for University and TAFE specialising in the Arts. Technology is used throughout the college enabling students to access their courses on-line.

Mindarie Senior College was one of six Australian Schools that were assessed as amount the top 65 of the world's best designs as featured in The 2006 OECD Compendium of Exemplary Educational Facilities.

== See also ==
- List of schools in the Perth metropolitan area
