= Nowergup, Western Australia =

Nowergup
- Suburb
- Interactive map of Nowergup
- Coordinates: 31.637°S 115.746°E
- Country: Australia
- State: Western Australia
- City: Perth
- LGA: City of Wanneroo
- Location: 40 km (25 mi) N of Perth City

Government
  - State electorate: Mindarie
  - Federal division: Pearce

Area
  - Total: 40 km^{2} (15 sq mi)

Population
  - Total: 189 (SAL 2021)
- Postcode: 6032
Suburbs around Nowergup
Alkimos	Carabooda
Butler	Nowergup	Pinjar
Ridgewood	Neerabup

Nowergup is a rural locality about 40 kilometres (25 mi) north of Perth, Western Australia. It is in the local government area of the City of Wanneroo.

== History ==
The suburb of Nowergup (sometimes spelled Nowgerup in earlier documents) takes its name from Lake Nowergup. The lake name was first recorded by Surveyor General John Septimus Roe in 1841, and is a Noongar word which possibly means "place of sweet water". It was approved as a suburb name in 1982.

== Geography ==
Nowergup is bounded by Romeo Road/Karoborup Road to the north, the Mitchell Freeway to the west, Pinjar Road to the east and Hester Avenue and Wattle Avenue to the south.

At the Australian Bureau of Statistics 2011 census, Nowergup had a population of 212 people living in 81 dwellings.

== Facilities ==
Nowergup is a sparsely populated agricultural suburb. Several plant nurseries, the Ocean View Tavern and the Nowergup Lake wetland and fauna sanctuary are situated along Wanneroo Road. The western strip between Wanneroo Road and the Mitchell Freeway is approximately the northern half of the Neerabup National Park. The area also contains most of the Pinjar Pine Plantation, numerous sand and limestone quarries and a Water Corporation biosolids facility. Barbagallo Raceway is located just beyond Nowergup's southern border.

The Nowergup railway depot is located off Hester Avenue.

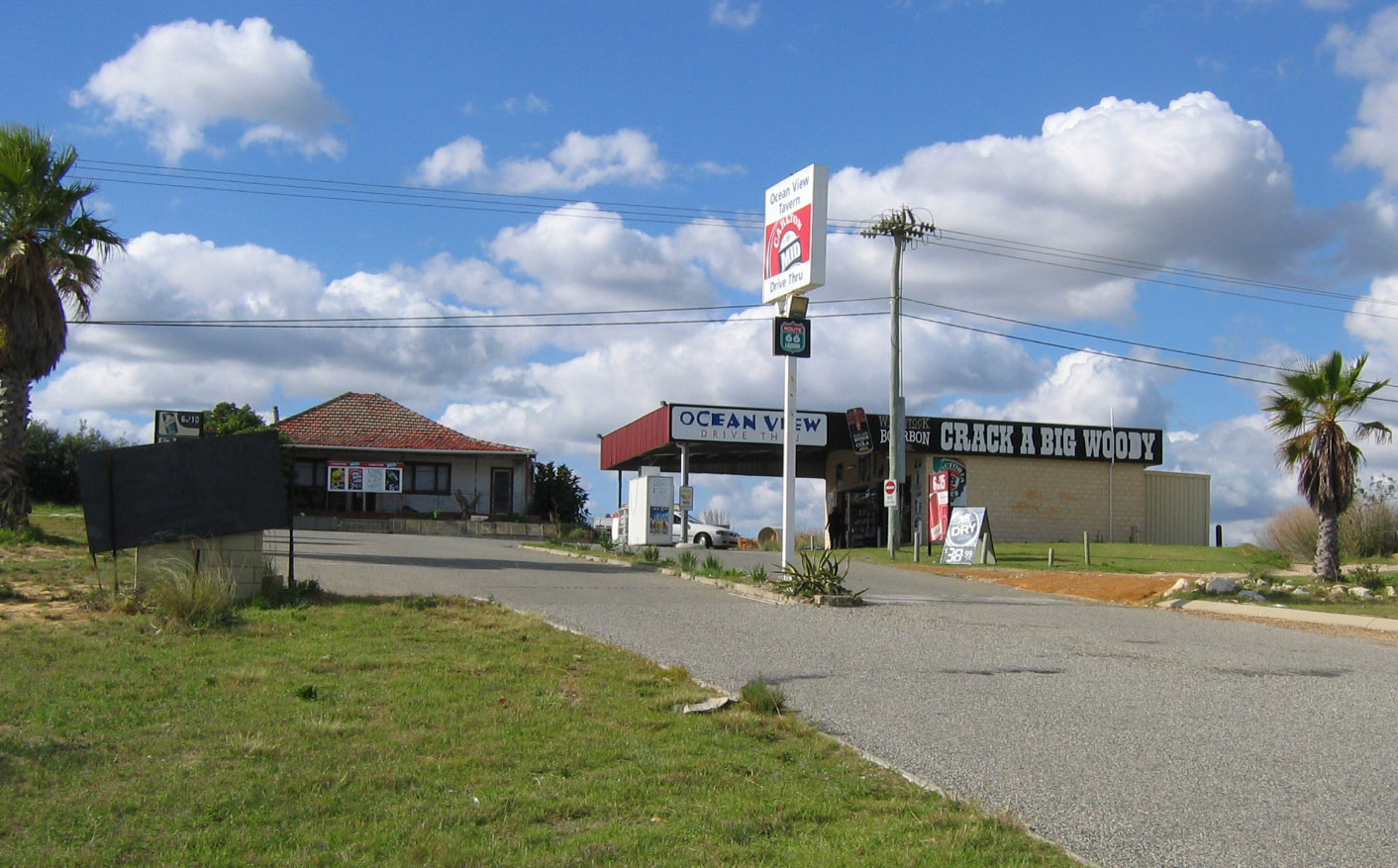
Ocean View Tavern on Wanneroo Road
