= Neerabup, Western Australia =

Neerabup Perth, Western Australia
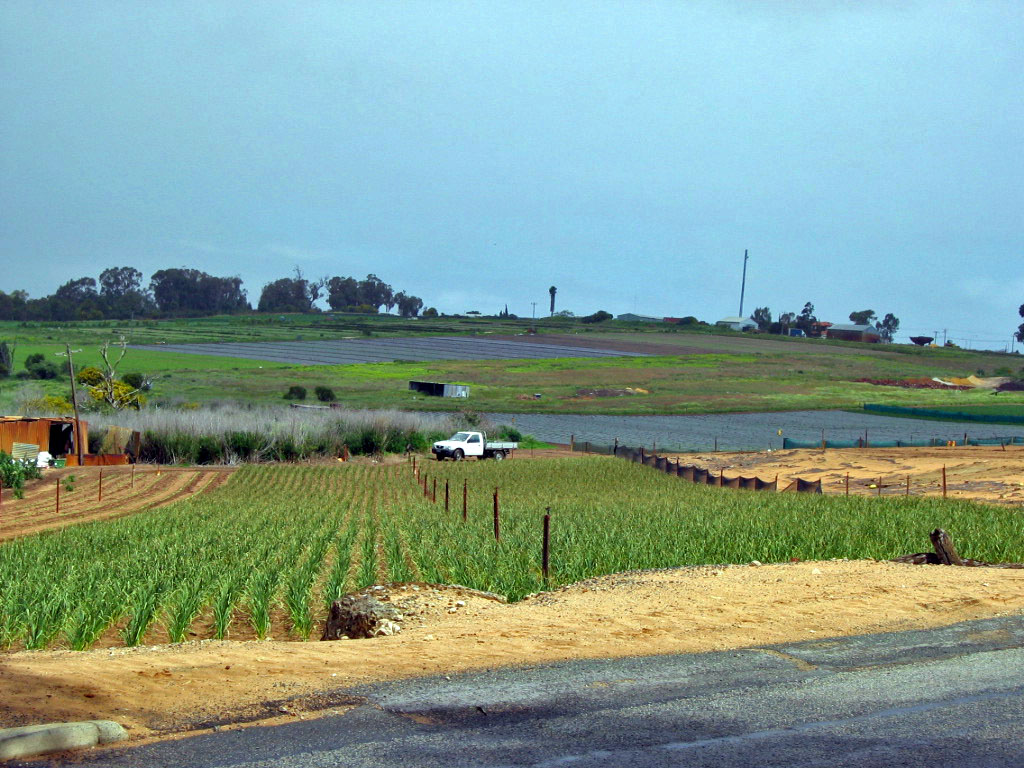
- Agricultural land on Wattle Avenue
- Coordinates: 31.691°S 115.777°E
- Population: 112 (SAL 2021)
- Postcode(s): 6031
- Area: 34 km^{2} (13.1 sq mi)
- Location: 36 km (22 mi) from Perth CBD
- LGA(s): City of Wanneroo
- State electorate(s): Mindarie
- Federal division(s): Pearce
Suburbs around Neerabup:
Ridgewood; Clarkson	Nowergup	Pinjar
Tamala Park; Kinross	Neerabup	Pinjar
Wanneroo; Joondalup	Carramar	Banksia Grove

Neerabup is a rural locality in Perth, the capital of Western Australia, within the local government area of the City of Wanneroo.

== History ==
Prior to European settlement, the Noongar people had lived in the area for more than 40,000 years, taking advantage of the abundant food and water around the chain of wetlands on the coastal plain. In winter, they moved eastwards away from coastal weather, to return in summer as inland supplies dried up. The Mooro people (led by elder Yellagonga during the early years of European settlement) stretched from the Moore River near Guilderton to what is now the Perth central business district, and used to move between Lakes Joondalup, Neerabup and Yanchep.

In 1865, European settlers established the Aboriginal tracks as a stock route from Dongara to Fremantle, travelling along the west side of the lakes. Lake Neerabup was first recorded by surveyor J. Cowle in 1867, the name being a Noongar word which possibly means "swampy place" or "small basin". The part of the stock route between Joondalup and Yanchep is now part of the Yaberoo Budjara Heritage Trail, part of the Bicentennial Heritage Trails Network established in 1988.

The area was often spelled Neerabub, especially by postal and telecommunications authorities, until as recently as the 1960s. It was approved as a suburb name in 1982.

== Geography ==
Neerabup is bounded by Wattle Avenue to the north, the Mitchell Freeway to the west, Pinjar Road to the east and Flynn Drive and Burns Beach Road to the south.

Neerabup's population was not measured at the 2001 Australian census.

== Facilities ==
Neerabup is a sparsely populated agricultural suburb. Several plant nurseries, a fruit and vegetable shop at Menchetti Road and the Neerabup Lake wetland are situated along Wanneroo Road. The western strip between Wanneroo Road and the proposed Mitchell Freeway is approximately the southern half of the Neerabup National Park. The area also contains a golf course, small wineries, a small industrial area on Flynn Drive and several sand and limestone quarries.

== Motorsport ==
Neerabup is home to the Wanneroo Raceway, a 2,411-metre (1.498 mi) road racing circuit. Wanneroo Raceway, which opened in 1969, is the home of motor racing in Western Australia and hosts an annual round of the Supercars Championship.

Neerabup is also home to the Pinjar Park Speedway which opened in 2005. Pinjar Park is a 142-metre (155 yd) Motorcycle speedway which regularly hosts national and international meetings and caters to both senior and junior solo and sidecar racing. Pinjar Park is considered small for a speedway in Australia, with most tracks around the country ranging from 350 metres (380 yd) to 600 metres (660 yd) in length. For the bikes, the speedway replaced the old 550-metre (600 yd) Claremont Speedway which had run from 1927 until 2000, and the Bibra Lake Speedway which closed in 2004.

== Transport ==
Neerabup is not served by public transport. The nearest Transperth bus service is the 391 between Joondalup train station and Carramar 2 kilometres (1.2 mi) to the south. These services are operated by Swan Transit.

=== Bus ===
- 390 Joondalup Station to Banksia Grove – serves Burns Beach Road and Joondalup Drive
- 391 Joondalup Station to Banksia Grove – serves Burns Beach Road, Joondalup Drive and Wanneroo Road
- 467 and 468 Joondalup Station to Whitfords Station – serve Joondalup Drive

=== Rail ===
- Yanchep line
  - Clarkson Station

== Politics ==
Neerabup's political leanings are unclear due to its small size and the lack of a polling booth. The nearest large booths tend to favour the Australian Labor Party historically, although most have been won by the Coalition in recent times, especially at federal level.
