= Ocean Reef Road =

Road in Perth, Western Australia

Coordinates: 31°46′29″S 115°47′24″E

Ocean Reef Road Western Australia
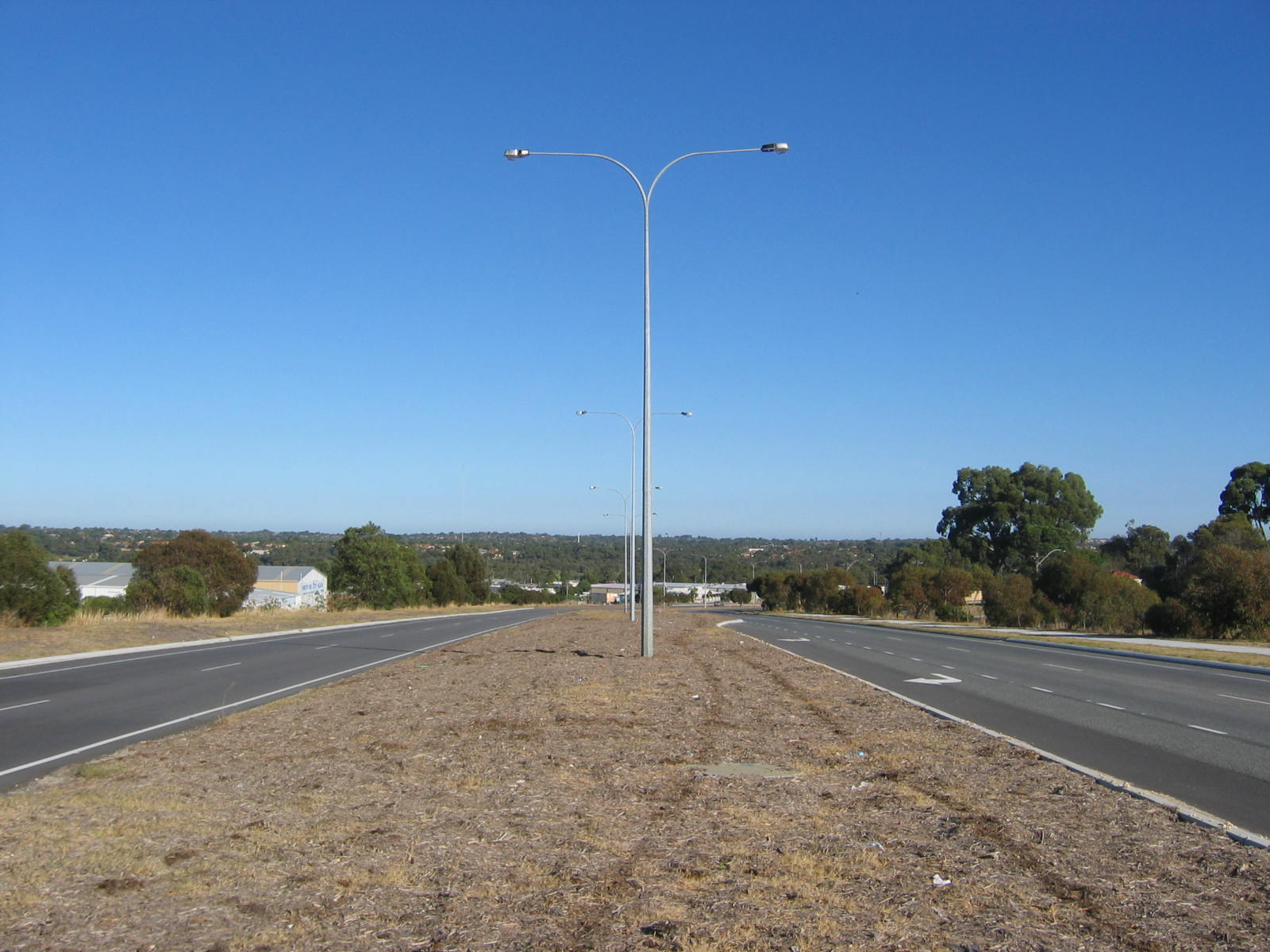
- View west from Wangara

General information
- Type: Road
- Length: 15.6 km (9.7 mi)
- Route number(s): State Route 84 (east of Marmion Avenue)

Major junctions
- Northwest end: Shenton Avenue, Iluka
- Marmion Avenue (State Route 71); Mitchell Freeway (State Route 2); Joondalup Drive (State Route 85); Wanneroo Road (State Route 60)
- Southeast end: Gnangara Road (State Route 83 / State Route 84), Wangara

Location(s)
- Major suburbs: Ocean Reef, Mullaloo, Heathridge, Beldon, Edgewater, Woodvale, Pearsall

Ocean Reef Road is an arterial east-west road in Perth, Western Australia. It is located within the northern suburbs of Perth, from Ocean Reef in the west, to Landsdale in the east, with a portion travelling northwards along the coast to Iluka.

== History ==
Up until the mid-1970s the road from Wanneroo Road was named Mullaloo Drive between Wanneroo Road and Craigie Drive/Coyle Road. Mullaloo Drive took the course and road names of today from Wanneroo Road (at Villa Nova) along Mangano Place, Backshall Place, Ocean Reef Road up to Wildlife Place, continuing over the current Mitchell Freeway into Coyle Road, Craigie Drive, Kallaroo Place and then Mullaloo Drive joining Oceanside Promenade at Mullaloo.

From the mid-1970s Ocean Reef Road was so named and constructed from a point approximately 500 metres (1,600 ft) west of today's Edgewater Drive up to Marmion Avenue (heading in a north-westerly fashion from the aforementioned point). Ocean Reef Road between Backshall Place and Wanneroo Road took at slightly different course south, from the original Mullaloo Drive. Then as the suburb of Ocean Reef was built in the 1980s and the Ocean Reef Marina were built, Ocean Reef Road was extended this far. During the 1980s the Joondalup Drive intersection was opened. Ocean Reef Road was the northern terminus of the Mitchell Freeway for eleven years from 1988 to 1999.

In the 1990s at the Wanneroo Road end, the road was extended to Hartman Drive near Wangara. The Mitchell Freeway terminated here in the early 1990s. After 1996 Ocean Reef Road was joined to Hodges Drive. In 2006 Ocean Reef Road was extended along the coast from Hodges Drive to Shenton Avenue.

The works to duplicate Ocean Reef Road between Wanneroo Road and Hartman Drive into a dual-carriageway road was to be completed in May 2008.

As part of the Federal Government's AusLink Strategic Regional Program, Ocean Reef Road was extended east to Alexander Drive. This work was carried out in two stages. First, from Hartman Drive to Prestige Parade (completed March 2009), and secondly, from Prestige Parade to Alexander Drive (commenced in April 2011 and was scheduled to be completed in February 2012). The construction of this stage also affected the alignment and layout of Gnangara Road, as the former section of Gnangara Road from Coverwood Promenade to Alexander Drive now forms part of Ocean Reef Road. Gnangara Road's western section now terminates at Mirrabooka Avenue (formerly Madeley Street), with the remaining section retained as part of the local road network.

Between 2019 and 2020 works were conducted to convert Ocean Reef Road’s intersection with Wanneroo Road to a grade separated interchange, which involves Wanneroo Road free-flowing over traffic light controlled intersections at Ocean Reef Road.

== Route description ==
Ocean Reef Road commences at the intersection of the southern and eastern legs of Gnangara Road and Sydney Road in Landsdale, with Ocean Reef Road continuous with the eastern leg of Gnangara Road, and terminates at the roundabout with Shenton Avenue in Ocean Reef, continuing northwards as Burns Beach Road. The road is a four-lane dual carriageway for almost its entire length, with the exception of the northwards parts running parallel with the coast, where the road is a two-lane single carriageway between Swanson Way and Hodges Drive, though it widens to a two-lane divided carriageway for the remainder of its length. It predominantly carries an 80 kilometres per hour (50 mph) speed limit, which reduces to 70 kilometres per hour (43 mph) at Trappers Drive, and then to 50 kilometres per hour (31 mph) from Hodges Drives to its northwestern terminus. The section of the road east of Marmion Avenue forms part of State Route 84, along with the eastern section of Gnangara Road. The section west of Marmion Avenue lost the designation in December 2023.

=== City of Wanneroo ===
Ocean Reef Road commences at a traffic light intersection with the southern and eastern legs of Gnangara Road and Sydney Road. Ocean Reef Road is continuous with the eastern leg of Gnangara Road, while Sydney Road is continuous with the southern leg of Gnangara Road, which also leads to Mirrabooka Avenue. The road travels west for 4.7 kilometres (2.9 mi) to an interchange with Wanneroo Road, during which it borders the suburbs of Wangara, Gnangara, and Pearsall, and intersects with Hartman Drive and Lenore Road at a traffic light controlled intersection. At Ocean Reef Road’s interchange with Wanneroo Road, Wanneroo Road is free-flowing over traffic light controlled intersections at Ocean Reef Road.

Ocean Reef Road then travels through the suburbs of Woodvale and Wanneroo, as well as the Yellagonga Regional Park reserve for 1.7 kilometres (1.1 mi) up until the southern part Lake Joondalup, where the road transfers into the City of Joondalup local government area.

=== City of Joondalup ===
Ocean Reef Road, now within the City of Joondalup, continues to border Woodvale to the south but now borders Edgewater to the north. The road intersects with Trappers Drive and Edgewater Drive (the former of which is signalised), encountering a traffic light controlled T-junction with Joondalup Drive 1.1 kilometres (0.68 mi) from the City of Joondalup and Wanneroo boundaries. Only another 280 metres (920 ft) later takes the road to the Mitchell Freeway at a standard diamond interchange.

Following the freeway interchange, Ocean Reef Road is now bordering both Beldon and Heathridge, intersecting with local roads such as Eddystone Drive and Craigie Drive, bringing the road to Marmion Avenue after 2.9 kilometres (1.8 mi). The road then runs through Mullaloo and Ocean Reef for 1.6 kilometres (0.99 mi) before encountering a roundabout with Northshore Drive, at the northern terminus of Tourist Drive 204. Following this, Ocean Reef Road curves northwards and, now within the suburb of Ocean Reef, also starts to run parallel with the coastline. After 600 metres (2,000 ft) the road promptly reduces to a two-lane single carriageway at Swanson Way, though the carriageways separate at Hodges Drive another 600 metres (2,000 ft) later. Between the two roads there is an entrance to the Ocean Reef Boat Harbour. The road continues to run parallel to the coastline as a two-lane divided carriageway through Ocean Reef for about 2.7 kilometres (1.7 mi) before terminating at Shelton Avenue at Iluka. Ocean Reef Road continues northwards as Burns Beach Road and State Route 87 from this point.

== Major intersections ==
LGA	Location	km	mi	Destinations	Notes
Joondalup	Iluka–Ocean Reef boundary	0	0.0	Shenton Avenue – Currambine, Connolly, Joondalup	Northern terminus at roundabout. Continues north as Burns Beach Road.
Joondalup	Ocean Reef	1.2	0.75	Resolute Way	Roundabout
Joondalup	Ocean Reef	2.1	1.3	Hodges Drive – Heathridge, Joondalup	Roundabout
Joondalup	Ocean Reef	2.7	1.7	Swanson Way	Roundabout
Joondalup	Ocean Reef-Mullaloo boundary	3.3	2.1	Oceanside Promenade (Tourist Drive 204) – Kallaroo, Hillarys	Roundabout.
Joondalup	Ocean Reef-Mullaloo boundary	3.6	2.2	Venturi Drive	Roundabout.
Joondalup	Ocean Reef-Mullaloo boundary	3.9	2.4	Dampier Avenue	Roundabout.
Joondalup	Ocean Reef-Mullaloo boundary	4.5	2.8	Meridian Drive	Roundabout.
Joondalup	Ocean Reef-Heathridge-Beldon-Mullaloo quadripoint	4.8	3.0	Marmion Avenue (State Route 71) – Yanchep, Clarkson, Hillarys, Scarborough	Signalised intersection. State Route 84 western terminus
Joondalup	Heathridge-Beldon boundary	6.5	4.0	Eddystone Avenue – Craigie, Joondalup	Signalised intersection.
Joondalup	Heathridge-Beldon boundary	7.1	4.4	Craigie Drive – Craigie	Roundabout
Joondalup	Heathridge-Edgewater-Woodvale-Beldon quadripoint	7.6– 7.8	4.7– 4.8	Mitchell Freeway (State Route 2) – Butler, Currambine, Stirling, Perth	Signalised T-intersection. Access to Joondalup railway station
Joondalup	Edgewater–Woodvale boundary	8.1	5.0	Joondalup Drive (State Route 85) – Bullsbrook, Carramar, Tapping, Joondalup	Signalised intersection. Access to Lakeside Joondalup and Edgewater railway station.
Joondalup	Edgewater–Woodvale boundary	8.9	5.5	Trappers Drive	Signalised intersection.
Wanneroo	Wanneroo-Pearsall-Wangara-Woodvale quadripoint	10.4– 11.0	6.5– 6.8	Wanneroo Road (State Route 60), – Lancelin, Neerabup, Padbury, Perth	Signalised parclo interchange favouring Wanneroo Road. Ocean Reef east to Wanneroo Road north also free-flowing
Wanneroo	Pearsall-Wanneroo-Wangara tripoint	12.7	7.9	Lenore Road northbound / Hartman Drive southbound – Hocking, Madeley, Darch	Signalised intersection
Wanneroo	Wangara–Gnangara–Landsdale tripoint	15.7	9.8	Sydney Road north / Gnangara Road (State Route 83) south – Jandabup, Madeley, Mirrabooka, Ellenbrook	Eastern terminus at signalised intersection. Continues as Gnangara Road (State Route 84)
1.000 mi = 1.609 km; 1.000 km = 0.621 mi: Route transition; Note: Intersections with minor local roads are not shown
