= Neaves Road =

Road in Perth, Western Australia

Neaves Road Western Australia

General information
- Type: Road
- Length: 19.0 km (12 mi)
- Route number(s): State Route 85 (west of Tonkin Highway)
- Former route number: State Route 86
- Tourist routes: Tourist Drive 359

Major junctions
- West end: Joondalup Drive (State Route 85). Banksia Grove
- Tonkin Highway (State Route 4)
- East end: Railway Parade. Bullsbrook

Location(s)
- Major suburbs: Mariginiup, Pinjar, Melaleuca

Neaves Road is an arterial east–west road in the metropolitan area of Perth, Western Australia. It is located within the city's far northern suburbs, connecting Banksia Grove in the west to Bullsbrook in the east.

== Route description ==
Neaves Road is part of State Route 85 which, along with Joondalup Drive and Burns Beach Road, provides the northernmost connection between Perth's northwestern and northeastern suburbs. It forms the majority of a direct link between Mitchell Freeway/Wanneroo Road in the west and to Brand and Great Northern Highways in the east. The next connection to the north is Gingin Brook Road and to the south Gnangara Road.

Neaves Road's northeastern terminus is at an give-way controlled T-intersection with Railway Parade on the western outskirts of Bullsbrook in the City of Swan while the southwestern terminus is at the intersection with Old Yanchep Road (formerly Pinjar Road) on the boundary between Mariginiup and Banksia Grove in the City of Wanneroo. The road continues west as Joondalup Drive.

It is a two-lane single carriageway for almost all of its length, but the road briefly splits into four lanes on the approaches to its interchange with Tonkin Highway. The western and eastern thirds of Neaves Road passes through market gardens and farmland while the central third is mostly native bushland associated with the Swan Coastal Plain. The speed limit is 110 kilometres per hour (68 mph) between Kirby Road and Timely Hostess Mews and 80 kilometres per hour (50 mph) elsewhere.

Perth's Outback Splash water park lies on Neaves Road, located 2 km west of the Tonkin Highway interchange.

== History ==
The road is believed to be named after Thomas Cooper "Tom" Neaves, who lived in the area and was associated with both the Wanneroo Road Board and Agricultural Society.

Prior to 2005 the western end of Neaves Road commenced from a T-junction with Pinjar Road with both roads forming State Route 86. Concerns with heavy traffic on the latter road in conjunction with a recent extension of Joondalup Drive led to Pinjar Road undergoing changes in alignment. Pinjar Road was made discontinuous at the intersection with Neaves Road now made free-flowing onto Joondalup Drive. As a result of the changes Neaves Road became part of State Route 85, with 86 now discontinued.

In 2020 Tonkin Highway was extended northwards from the Perth metropolitan area to the town of Muchea as part of NorthLink WA. A roundabout interchange with Neaves Road was constructed as part of the project along with a pedestrian and cyclist overpass.

== Future ==
The proposed Whiteman Yanchep Highway is expected to bisect Neaves Road once constructed. As part of the project the eastern section of Neaves Road is planned to be realigned northwards to connect to an extension of Flynn Drive from the west at a roundabout interchange. Funding has currently not been allocated for the project at this stage.

== Intersections ==
LGA	Location	km	mi	Destinations	Notes
Swan	Bullsbrook	0	0.0	Railway Parade (Tourist Drive 359) – Muchea, Bullsbrook, Upper Swan, Chittering	Northeastern terminus at T-junction..
Swan	Bullsbrook	1.8	1.1	Tonkin Highway (State Route 4) – Perth, Ellenbrook, Geraldton, Meekatharra	Roundabout interchange with Tonkin Highway free-flowing. State Route 85 eastern terminus
Joondalup	Banksia Grove–Pinjar–Mariginiup tripoint	19.0	11.8	Old Yanchep Road – Carabooda, Yanchep	South-western terminus at unsignalised T-intersection. Continues as Joondalup Drive (State Route 85, Tourist Drive 359) east to Joondalup, Burns Beach
1.000 mi = 1.609 km; 1.000 km = 0.621 mi: Concurrency terminus; Note: Intersections with minor local roads are not shown
