= Joondalup Drive =

Road in Perth, Western Australia

Joondalup Drive Western Australia

General information
- Type: Road
- Length: 12.6 km (7.8 mi)
- Opened: 1990s
- Route number(s): State Route 85

Major junctions
- Southwest end: Ocean Reef Road (State Route 84), Edgewater
- Hodges Drive; Grand Boulevard; Shenton Avenue; Moore Drive; Burns Beach Road (State Route 87); Wanneroo Road (State Route 60); Pinjar Road
- Northeast end: Neaves Road (State Route 85), Mariginiup

Location(s)
- Major suburbs: Joondalup, Carramar, Tapping, Banksia Grove

Joondalup Drive is a major distributor road in the northern suburbs of Perth, Western Australia. The road travels through the City of Joondalup's central business district and extends for a few kilometres east through neighbouring residential suburbs in the City of Wanneroo. The road was extended in 2005 to the northern suburb of Banksia Grove to provide easy access for residents to Joondalup's city centre, and to provide a complete connecting route to the Brand Highway from the Mitchell Freeway.

The route from Ocean Reef Road to Burns Beach Road was gazetted as Road No. 10951 by the Shire of Wanneroo in 1953.

== Route description ==
Joondalup Drive is part of State Route 85. The south-western terminus is Ocean Reef Road in Edgewater and the north-eastern terminus is Old Yanchep Road (formerly Pinjar Road) in Mariginiup, continuing eastwards as Neaves Road to Bullsbrook in the City of Swan. It is a four-lane dual carriageway for most of its length, reducing to a two-lane single carriageway for the remainder of its length east of Tumbleweed Drive and Joseph Banks Boulevard. The speed limit is mostly 70 kilometres per hour (43 mph), though there is a short 80 kilometres per hour (50 mph) section at the northern extent of the suburb of Joondalup.

=== City of Joondalup ===
Joondalup Drive commences at a traffic light controlled T-junction at Ocean Reef Road in Edgewater in the City of Joondalup LGA, and then travels through said suburb for 1.8 kilometres (1.1 mi) before intersecting at Eddystone Avenue, heading over into Joondalup. 450 metres (1,480 ft) takes the road to Sundew Rise and Lakeside Drive, the latter of which acts as an outer ring road and suburban street within the Joondalup CBD. Joondalup Drive runs through the CBD for about 3.4 kilometres (2.1 mi), intersecting Grand Boulevard, Hodges Drive, Shenton Avenue, and Moore Drive, as well as access to the Joondalup industrial area, Lakeside Joondalup, and Arena Joondalup. Grand Boulevard connects to Hodges Drive at its southern end and Moore Drive at its northern end. After the northern end of Lakeside Drive, Joondalup Drive runs through residential areas at the northern extent of Joondalup before reaching Burns Beach Road at a roundabout 1.5 kilometres (0.93 mi). About 350 metres (1,150 ft) further east, Joondalup Drive leaves the City of Joondalup LGA and heads over into the neighbouring City of Wanneroo.

=== City of Wanneroo ===
Joondalup Drive travels briefly through the northern edge of Wanneroo, providing access to the Wanneroo Botanic Gardens and Mini Golf complex, before reaching a roundabout interchange with Wanneroo Road 700 metres (2,300 ft) further east. The road then travels through the residential suburbs of Carramar and Tapping for 2.3 kilometres (1.4 mi) before reaching a roundabout with Pinjar Road, after which the road is completely within Banksia Grove. Joondalup Drive reduces to a two-lane single carriageway 650 metres (2,130 ft) further north, and ends a further 1.6 kilometres (0.99 mi) northeast at Old Yanchep Road. The road, and State Route 85, continue east as Neaves Road towards Bullsbrook, and to Tonkin Highway and Great Northern Highway.

== History ==
=== Early history ===
Joondalup Drive was originally known as Osborne Drive, but was renamed in the late 1979 when the proposal to change its name was brought before Wanneroo Shire Council by the Joondalup Development Corporation.

=== 2005 extension and duplication ===
In the early months of 2005, construction of a major extension to Joondalup Drive was undertaken, extending from its then-northern terminus at Yandella Promenande, Tapping, to Neaves Road, Banksia Grove. The duplication and extension was necessitated mainly by the large traffic volumes that used the section of Joondalup Drive between Wanneroo Road and Hodges Drive during morning and evening peak hours, mainly caused by heavy traffic flows to and from the Mitchell Freeway at its then-northern terminus at Hodges Drive.

The extension was constructed as a two-lane single carriageway, expanding to a four-lane dual carriageway in the vicinity of a major roundabout with Pinjar Road. It then reduced back to a two-lane single carriageway for the remainder of the road before intersecting with Neaves Road. The construction of this extension also required the upgrade of Joondalup Drive from before Burns Beach Road beyond Wanneroo Road to before Millendon Street, Carramar.

The construction of the extension including associated works caused some significant issues, particularly given its involvement in two local governments (the City of Joondalup and the City of Wanneroo), a state government department (Main Roads Western Australia), one state government utility (Western Power), and one public utility (Alinta). This caused significant issues in synchronisation of works, with each group causing delays for the other as their work progressed. One of the main delays in construction of the Wanneroo Road duplication was the relocation of 225 kVA high voltage power lines from the Tapping Substation that resided within the road reserve area that was needed for these works. Additionally, significant upgrade works were needed on the Burns Beach Road approaches to Joondalup Drive and the subsequent roundabout at this intersection that also required duplication.

The full works on this section were finally completed in 2006, some 18 months after they had commenced. During that time nearby Pinjar Road had been realigned, and State Route 86 was replaced by State Route 85 and Tourist Drive 359 (with the exception of Pinjar Road).

=== Subsequent works ===
Joondalup Drive was turned into a dual carriageway from St Stephens Crescent to Tumbleweed Drive in 2011.

In 2018 work started on upgrading the intersection with Wanneroo Road to a roundabout interchange, with Joondalup Drive passing over a roundabout with Wanneroo Road. This work is expected to be completed by late-2020.

== Major intersections ==
LGA	Location	km	mi	Destinations	Notes
Joondalup	Edgewater–Woodvale boundary	0	0.0	Ocean Reef Road (State Route 84) – Ocean Reef, Wangara, Ellenbrook	Southern terminus at signalised T-intersection
Joondalup	Edgewater	0.5	0.31	George Grey Place	Signalised T-intersection, access to Edgewater railway station
Joondalup	Edgewater	1.5	0.93	The Gateway west / Treetop Avenue east	Signalised intersection.
Joondalup	Edgewater–Joondalup boundary	1.8	1.1	Eddystone Avenue – Heathridge, Beldon, Craigie	Signalised T-intersection
Joondalup	Edgewater–Joondalup boundary	2.3	1.4	Sundew Rise west / Lakeside Avenue east	Signalised intersection.
Joondalup	Joondalup	3	1.9	Hodges Drive west / Grand Boulevard east – Heathridge, Connolly	Signalised intersection. Access to Edith Cowan University
Joondalup	Joondalup	3.8	2.4	Collier Pass	Signalised T-intersection. Access to Joondalup railway station
Joondalup	Joondalup	4	2.5	Cord Street	Signalised intersection. Access to Lakeside Joondalup
Joondalup	Joondalup	4.6	2.9	Shenton Avenue – Currambine, Iluka, Ocean Reef	Signalised intersection.
Joondalup	Joondalup	5.2	3.2	Moore Drive west / Grand Boulevard east – Currambine	Signalised intersection.
Wanneroo-Joondalup boundary	Neerabup–Joondalup boundary	7.3	4.5	Burns Beach Road (State Route 87) – Currambine, Iluka, Kinross, Burns Beach	Roundabout. Access to Currambine railway station
Wanneroo-Joondalup boundary	Wanneroo–Tapping–Neerabup–Carramar quadripoint	7.8– 8.6	4.8– 5.3	Wanneroo Road (State Route 60) – Lancelin, Wanneroo, Padbury, Perth	Roundabout interchange favouring Joondalup Drive
Wanneroo	Carramar-Tapping boundary	9.1	5.7	Cheriton Drive	Roundabout.
Wanneroo	Banksia Grove–Tapping–Carramar tripoint	10.5	6.5	Pinjar Road (Tourist Drive 359) – Ashby, Mariginiup	Roundabout. Tourist Drive 359 western concurrency terminus
Wanneroo	Banksia Grove	10.9	6.8	Ghost Gum Boulevard	Signalised T-intersection. No turn from Ghost Gum to Joondalup south
Wanneroo	Banksia Grove	11.1	6.9	Joseph Banks Boulevard west / Tumbleweed Drive east	Roundabout.
Wanneroo	Banksia Grove	12.3	7.6	Viridian Drive	Roundabout.
Wanneroo	Banksia Grove–Pinjar–Mariginiup tripoint	12.6	7.8	Old Yanchep Road – Carabooda, Yanchep	North-eastern terminus at unsignalised T-intersection. Continues as Neaves Road (State Route 85, Tourist Drive 359) east to Bullsbrook
1.000 mi = 1.609 km; 1.000 km = 0.621 mi: Concurrency terminus; Incomplete access; Note: Intersections with minor local roads are not shown

View southbound from Shenton Avenue
