= Pinjar Road =

Road in Perth, Western Australia

Pinjar Road Western Australia

General information
- Type: Road
- Length: 6.7 km (4.2 mi)
- Former route number: State Route 86
- Tourist routes: Tourist Drive 359

Major junctions
- South end: Wanneroo Road (State Route 60), Ashby
- Joondalup Drive (State Route 85)
- North end: Flynn Drive, Banksia Grove

Location(s)
- Major suburbs: Sinagra, Tapping, Mariginiup, Carramar

Pinjar Road is a major distributor road in the north-eastern suburbs of Perth, Western Australia, located within the City of Wanneroo.

The road was formerly part of the now-decommissioned State Route 86, and one of Perth's major arterial roads, previously connecting with Old Yanchep Road in Pinjar. Due to the road's impact as a freight route on adjoining residential properties, it was extensively realigned in 2005, and ultimately downgraded in importance with the extension of Joondalup Drive and State Route 85 a year later.

== History ==
=== 2005 re-alignment ===
In 2005, the relevant local government body responsible for the road, the City of Wanneroo, realised the importance of the road and the impact it has on the residents in the adjoining suburbs of Banksia Grove, Carramar, Mariginiup, Neerabup and Tapping due to increased traffic. Funding for the realignment was an issue as the responsibility of construction fell to the developers of the adjoining Carramar Golf Course Estate, Peet Limited, and the city's original plans did not call for construction of this road until at least 2008–2009.

In order to expedite construction and relieve traffic pressures, the city agreed to pre-fund construction of the realignment by Peet, enabling the road to be completed and opened midway through 2006. Prior to the opening of this realignment however, the extension of Joondalup Drive from Wanneroo Road to Neaves Road was also completed and opened to traffic. This in turn caused a large number of heavy westbound vehicles to deviate through local roads within Banksia Grove to connect with Joondalup Drive.

As a consequence of this, the City implemented an order to limit the types of vehicles allowed to pass through the suburb and imposed on-the-spot penalties of up to $5,000 for offenders. The need for this order was removed when the City subsequently closed the old alignment of Pinjar Road south of the Joondalup Drive/Neaves Road intersection, and north of the Yandella Promenade (formerly Clarkson Avenue)/Pinjar Road intersection.

=== Division of old road ===
After the opening of the new Pinjar Road alignment in 2005, the old Pinjar Road was closed and divided into four distinct parts, completely ending its use as an arterial and distributor road for traffic:

- Old Yanchep Road to Neaves Road – this part was renamed "Old Yanchep Road" for its entire length, but remained otherwise unchanged.
- Neaves Road to Yandella Promenade – this portion was blocked and closed off at both ends, turning it into a very long local road that can only be accessed through a network of smaller roads in Banksia Grove and Mariginiup. The northern half of the road was renamed to "Greenvale Place" and sealed off from Neaves Road by large rocks, while the southern half became "Mornington Drive". 300m of road was ripped up between Mornington Drive and Pinjar Road to prevent its use as a route of travel.
- Yandella Promenade to Ashley Road – like the above portion, this part was blocked and closed off at both ends, but it runs parallel to the new alignment and so still assumes the name "Pinjar Road". Like Mornington Drive, 250m of road was ripped up at the road's southern end.
- Ashley Road to Wanneroo Road – this remained mostly unchanged, deviating west and running into the new alignment just after the Ashley Road junction. The southern part of the road was re-aligned north-westwards to create a right-angled intersection with Wanneroo Road, where traffic lights were installed.

The new Pinjar Road follows the old Pinjar Road route from Wanneroo Road, up until Yandella Promenade, where it deviates from the original junction at Neaves Road, to a large roundabout at Joondalup Drive 2 km further south-west. The road now completely bypasses Banksia Grove and forms a suburb boundary between Banksia Grove and Tapping.

=== Southern realignment ===
An $8 million project to realign and reconstruct Pinjar Road between Wanneroo Road to Galileo Avenue was undertaken by the City of Wanneroo. The project began in April 2010, with part of the new road opened to traffic in December 2010. Works were scheduled to be completed by December 2011. The works included shifting the southern terminus with Wanneroo road north-east by approximately 260 metres (850 ft).

=== Extension to Flynn Drive ===
On 9 October 2018, an extension to Pinjar Road was completed and opened to the public, which saw the road connect to Flynn Drive instead of its existing termination point at Joondalup Drive.

This provides direct access to Flynn Drive for residents in Banksia Grove, making it quicker to access the Mitchell Freeway via Neerabup Road instead of Burns Beach Road. Clarkson train station on the Joondalup line also became the closest station for residents instead of Currambine station.

== Route description ==
The road travels generally north from Wanneroo Road, servicing the following suburbs:

- Ashby
- Banksia Grove
- Carramar
- Mariginiup
- Neerabup
- Tapping
- Wanneroo

Only the intersection with Wanneroo Road is controlled by Traffic lights. Traffic flow is maintained by the use of roundabouts and Give Way signs at junctions along the route.

== Major intersections ==
The entire road's length is within the City of Wanneroo, with major intersections by roundabouts unless otherwise indicated.

Location	km	mi	Destinations	Notes
Neerabup–Banksia Grove–Carramar tripoint	0.0	0.0	Flynn Drive – Mindarie, Clarkson, Pinjar	Northern terminus at give way t-junction
Banksia Grove–Carramar boundary	2.2	1.4	Golf Links Drive westbound / Jewel Way eastbound	
Banksia Grove–Tapping–Carramar tripoint	2.7	1.7	Joondalup Drive (State Route 85;Tourist Drive 359) – Joondalup, Burns Beach, Bullsbrook	Tourist Drive 359 northern concurrency terminus
Mariginiup–Tapping boundary	3.5	2.2	Yandella Promenade	T-junction. Formerly Clarkson Avenue
Mariginiup–Sinagra–Ashby tripoint	5.6	3.5	Hollosy Way westbound / Caporn Street eastbound	
Sinagra–Ashby boundary	6.2	3.9	Carosa Road westbound / Messina Drive eastbound	
Wanneroo–Sinagra–Ashby tripoint	6.8	4.2	Wanneroo Road (State Route 60) – Lancelin, Wanneroo, Padbury, Perth	Southern terminus at traffic light controlled t-junction.Tourist Drive 359 northern concurrency terminus
1.000 mi = 1.609 km; 1.000 km = 0.621 mi: Route transition; Note: Intersections with minor local roads are not shown
