= Wanneroo (disambiguation) =

Wanneroo is a suburb of Perth, Western Australia, located within the City of Wanneroo.

Wanneroo may also refer to:

- City of Wanneroo, a local government area in the north of Perth, Western Australia
- Wanneroo Road, an arterial road north of Perth
- Wanneroo Raceway, a motor racing circuit
- Electoral district of Wanneroo, an electorate of the Western Australian Legislative Assembly
