= Hodges Drive =

Road in Perth, Western Australia

Coordinates: 31.7544°S 115.7507°E

Hodges Drive Western Australia

General information
- Type: Road
- Length: 4 km (2.5 mi)

Major junctions
- West end: Boat Harbour Quays, Ocean Reef
- Marmion Avenue (State Route 71); Mitchell Freeway (State Route 2)
- East end: Joondalup Drive (State Route 85), Joondalup

Location(s)
- Major suburbs: Connolly, Heathridge

Hodges Drive is a main west–east road in Joondalup, north of Perth, Western Australia. It begins in the suburb of Ocean Reef at a T-junction with Boat Harbour Quays in the Ocean Reef Marina and runs through the residential areas in Ocean Reef, Connolly and Heathridge, before terminating at Joondalup Drive. The road continues from there as Grand Boulevard. Hodges Drive is a four-lane dual-carriageway for its entire length apart from a small section near the intersection with Boat Harbour Quays where it becomes a two-lane road.

== History ==
Hodges Drive's construction began in February 1981, to connect the northern end of Marmion Avenue with Joondalup Drive. Its purpose was to allow for easier access to the Joondalup suburbs development, especially at the time, the newly built Wanneroo District Hospital and the Shire of Wanneroo's new administration buildings. Developed in two stages, the first clearing and establishing a limestone road base, and the second the sealing of the road with its completion as a two-lane road by the spring of 1981. An underpass for pedestrians was also built between Connolly and Heathridge.

The northern part of the Mitchell Freeway terminated at Hodges Drive between 1999 and 2008, and the road provides freeway access for residents in the Joondalup city area.

A project to duplicate Hodges Drive, turning it into a dual carriageway for its entire length, was completed by the end of June 2013.

Hodges Drive was extended to Boat Harbour Quays as part of the Ocean Reef Marina Project. Construction lasted 8 months and was completed on 20 July 2021.

== Major intersections ==
The entire road's length is within the City of Joondalup.

Location	km	mi	Destinations	Notes
Ocean Reef	0	0.0	Boat Harbour Quays	Western terminus at T-intersection
Ocean Reef	0.4	0.25	Ocean Reef Road (State Route 85) Iluka, Mullaloo, Wangara, Ellenbrook	Roundabout
Ocean Reef	0.7	0.43	Venturi Drive	Roundabout
Ocean Reef	1.1	0.68	Constellation Drive	Roundabout
Ocean Reef–Connolly–Heathridge tripoint	1.4	0.87	Marmion Avenue (State Route 71) – Yanchep, Clarkson, Hillarys, Scarborough	Traffic light controlled intersection
Connolly–Heathridge boundary	2.5	1.6	Caridean Street	Traffic light controlled intersection
Connolly, Heathridge, Joondalup tripoint	3.4– 3.6	2.1– 2.2	Mitchell Freeway (State Route 2) – Butler, Currambine, Stirling, Perth	Signalised diamond interchange. Mitchell Freeway free-flowing.
Joondalup	4.0	2.5	Joondalup Drive (State Route 85) – Bullsbrook, Carramar, Tapping, Edgewater	Eastern terminus at signalised intersection. Continues as Grand Boulevard eastbound
1.000 mi = 1.609 km; 1.000 km = 0.621 mi

Views along Hodges Drive
Westbound from Joondalup Drive, crossing over Mitchell Freeway

Westbound approach to Marmion Avenue
