= Carramar =

Carramar may refer to:

- Carramar, New South Wales, suburb of Sydney, New South Wales
- Carramar, Western Australia, suburb of Perth, Western Australia
