= Edgewater, Western Australia =

Edgewater Perth, Western Australia
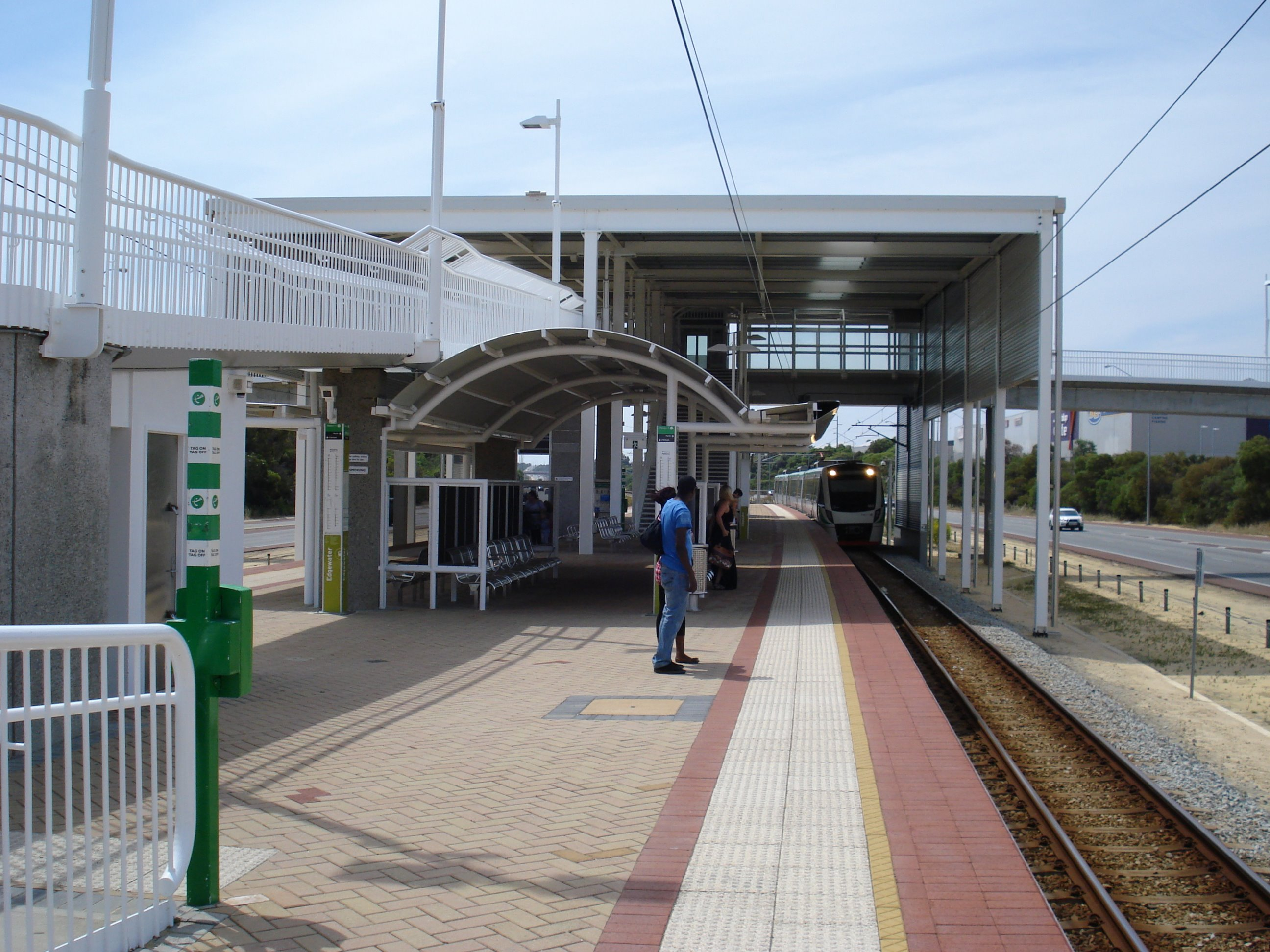
- Edgewater railway station
- Coordinates: 31.763°S 115.782°E
- Population: 4,657 (SAL 2021)
- Established: 1974
- Postcode(s): 6027
- Location: 23 km (14 mi) from Perth CBD
- LGA(s): City of Joondalup
- State electorate(s): Joondalup
- Federal division(s): Division of Moore
Suburbs around Edgewater:
Connolly	Joondalup	Wanneroo
Heathridge	Edgewater	Hocking
Craigie	Woodvale	Woodvale

Edgewater is a suburb of Perth, Western Australia 23 kilometres (14 mi) north of Perth's central business district. Edgewater was approved as a suburb name in 1974, and its local government area is the City of Joondalup. It is named after its location on the western edge of Lake Joondalup, which is surrounded by Yellagonga Regional Park.

== Transport ==
Edgewater is serviced by the 466 and 465 Transperth bus routes from Joondalup, operated by Swan Transit. Edgewater railway station is located in the far southwest of the suburb.

== Geography ==
Edgewater is bounded by Joondalup Drive to the west, Ocean Reef Road to the south and Yellagonga Regional Park to the east.

== Facilities ==
Edgewater is a residential suburb, with shopping facilities including a supermarket, restaurant, newsagency, chemist, liquor store and barbecue facilities by the lake.

== Primary and secondary education ==
Edgewater contains one high school, Mater Dei College (a Catholic school), and one primary school, Edgewater Primary School (a public school).
