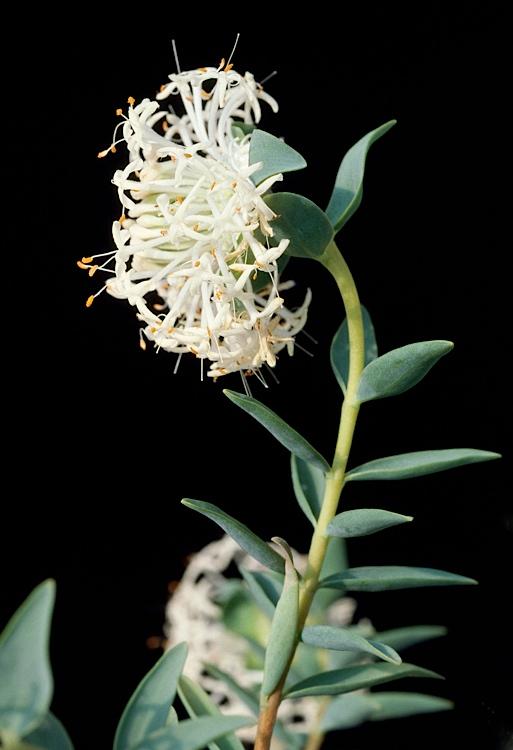
- In the Australian National Botanic Gardens

Scientific classification
- Kingdom: Plantae
- Clade: Tracheophytes
- Clade: Angiosperms
- Clade: Eudicots
- Clade: Rosids
- Order: Malvales
- Family: Thymelaeaceae
- Genus: Pimelea
- Species: P. floribunda

Binomial name
- Pimelea floribunda Meisn.

Synonyms
- Banksia floribunda (Meisn.) Kuntze

= Pimelea floribunda =

Species of shrub

Pimelea floribunda is a species of flowering plant in the family Thymelaeaceae and is endemic to the south-west of Western Australia. It is a shrub with narrowly elliptic to egg-shaped leaves arranged in opposite pairs, and drooping, head-like clusters of white or cream-coloured, tube-shaped flowers.

== Description ==
Pimelea floribunda is a shrub that typically grows to a height of 0.25–1 m (9.8 in – 3 ft 3.4 in) and has glabrous stems. The leaves are narrowly elliptic to egg-shaped, 7–40 mm (0.28–1.57 in) long, 2–15 mm (0.079–0.591 in) wide and glabrous. The flowers are arranged in drooping heads of many flowers, the heads usually surrounded by 4 egg-shaped involucral bracts 10–28 mm (0.39–1.10 in) long and 8–20 mm (0.31–0.79 in) wide. The floral tube is 14–17 mm (0.55–0.67 in) long and the sepals 3.5–5.0 mm (0.14–0.20 in) long. Flowering occurs from July to October.

== Taxonomy ==
Pimelea floribunda was first formally described in 1857 by Carl Meissner in de Candolle's Prodromus Systematis Naturalis Regni Vegetabilis from specimens collected by James Drummond. The specific epithet (floribunda) means "flowering profusely".

== Distribution and habitat ==
This pimelea grows on coastal sand dunes, limestone ridges and lateritic breakaways in near-coastal areas between Northampton, and Wanneroo, in the Avon Wheatbelt, Geraldton Sandplains, Jarrah Forest and Swan Coastal Plain bioregions of south-western Western Australia.

== Conservation status ==
Pimelea floribunda is listed as "not threatened" by the Government of Western Australia Department of Biodiversity, Conservation and Attractions.
