= Ocean Reef Marina =

Marina development Perth, Western Australia

Coordinates: 31°45′29″S 115°43′31″E

Ocean Reef Marina is a development project in Ocean Reef, Western Australia to construct a new marina with commercial and residential areas at the existing Ocean Reef Boat Harbour. The site is being developed by DevelopmentWA; construction of its two breakwaters started in April 2021, with the whole project expected to be fully completed in 2036 and then becoming part of the City of Joondalup. A marina in the area of Mullaloo and Ocean Reef had first been proposed in 1973.

== History ==
=== 1970s ===
A plan for a marina at Ocean Reef was first proposed in early 1973 when Urban Systems Corporation commissioned a report for Kaiser Aetna Australia called the Marina Development in Perth: A Market Survey Analysis. The report investigated and established that there was a need for alternative marina and recreational facilities in Perth as the boating pens on the Swan River had become congested. Though the Ocean Reef Marina concept was the idea of a developer it was incorporated into a Government of Western Australia Metropolitan Report Planning Authority document in April 1973 as a Concept Plan.

By April 1974, developers Kaiser Aetna Australia and AVJennings had commissioned another report from the Urban Systems Corporation called the Ocean Reef Marina at Mullaloo - Report No 2 . The Ocean Reef area at that time consisted of 1,330 hectares (3,300 acres) in the Shire of Wanneroo and consisted of sand plains, dunes and limestone outcrops and a proposed suburb with a future population of 31,000. Land was owned as crown land by the Shire of Wanneroo while land below the high water mark was owned by the Public Works Department. Under section 116 of the Lands Act 1933, waterfront property could only be leased for twenty-one years while the developers would have needed a longer lease of 50 years if the project was to proceed. Three types of marinas were proposed, to be located at the north end of the West Coast Highway in Mullaloo, close to where it ended just after its intersection with Korella Street.

The first 1974 proposal was for a marina of 95,000 square metres (1,020,000 sq ft) and 500 vessels or more costing $1.8 million. A second proposal for a harbour of 65,000 square metres (700,000 sq ft) and 450 boats costing $1,452,700 and lastly for a protected boat launching area for $292,000. The second proposal was chosen as the preferred option with the report outlying a plan for a harbour, a residential community, shops, and tourist and recreational facilities. Early environmental issues identified were possible seasonal sand accumulation in harbour and constraints as to how much limestone rock for the breakwater could come from the land around the harbour site. Other problems identified included rising land elevations and the location of the reef offshore.

The chosen proposal outlined a marina of 450 boat pens that would include launching ramps for the public, commercial facilities related to boating and maintenance such as fuel, boat repairs, chandlers and showrooms with the marina becoming the community centre for the future Ocean Reef suburb with shops, taverns, a theatre and meeting hall. A tourist centre was also proposed with a hotel and restaurant and a residential area with ninety high to medium homes.

Between mid-1974 and mid-1975, the Shire of Wanneroo joined with Kaiser, to share the costs needed to investigate the ocean and beach environments around the proposed marina site, publishing an interim report in October 1974. A final report was presented to the council in June 1977 after further investigations were conducted from December 1976 co-ordinating previous work while further oceanographic and biological studies were conducted. The Environmental Protection Agency (EPA) then requested that two Environmental Review and Management Programme (ERMP) be developed before granting approval.

The Public Works Department investigated three possible marina sites at the Pinnaroo Point, the Ocean Reef Private Marina site and the North Mullaloo Outfall Site as part of their Ocean Reef Boat Launching - Environmental Review and Management Programme. The Pinnaroo Point site at Whitfords was excluded due to the cost of littoral drift passing, limited land at the Whitford Nodes and beaches that were more suitable for recreational beach activities. The Ocean Reef Private Marina site, on the Mullaloo / Ocean Reef border, from a 1974 proposal by developer Kaiser, was discounted after concern over the accumulation of sand at Mullaloo Beach by littoral drift that would be caused by the proposed breakwater and could cause sand to be blown across the new suburbs. There was also a concern that a downdrift at northern beaches such as Burns Beach would cause sand there to be lost due to the breakwater. The last site, North Mullaloo Outfall Site was the location of the Water Corporation's sewerage outfall site for its future Beenyup wastewater treatment plant near Beldon, was very close to proposed Ocean Reef Private Marina site. This became the preferred site for a number of reasons including groynes that had already been built for the outfall site and land cleared for that development, additional land around the site and the Mullaloo and proposed Ocean Reef land developments nearby. Due to the existing groynes and the rocky coast made the management of the littoral drift at the site less costly.

These two ERMP's were presented to the EPA in February 1978, one from the Public Works Department concerning the marine and nearshore environments and the other from the Shire concerning the onshore development. The development was subject to a 30-day public review in March 1978 before the EPA granted permission for a Stage 1 development on 20 April 1978 subject to a development management plan by the Shire concerning cliffs, caves, coves, heath and limestone pinnacles. Any further developments would require a further submission assessing Stage 1 and another management plan. Stage one consisted of a breakwater, four launching sites with piers, parking for two hundred cars and trailers, toilets and changerooms, roads, drains and earthworks. The Shire of Wanneroo purchased Lot 1029 Ocean Reef from Kaiser Aetna for land required to service the marina. The price paid was $525,000.

On 2 December 1979, the Ocean Reef Boat Harbour in Ocean Reef, was officially opened by Premier Charles Court. It was a joint project of the State Government and the Shire of Wanneroo and cost $1.6 million. It consisted of a harbour surrounded by a limestone breakwater and had four ramps capable of 200 boat launches.

=== 1980s ===
In February 1984, it was proposed to the shire that there was an opportunity to involve the facilities in the shire, in a future event to be held of Fremantle, the 1987 America's Cup. Proposals included facilities for spectator boats and back-up facilities. At the time, there was a concept plan before council for a boat harbour south of the current Ocean Reef boat harbour as well as expansion of the site around the latter, while the former would become the future Hillarys Boat Harbour in 1988.

During April 1984 the results Wanneroo Coastal Study Report was presented to Wanneroo Shire Council and it outlined the opportunities and constraints along the coast that it managed and identified areas for management development and conservation. In May 1984, Local Coastal Management Plan, part of the above study, was presented to council and was the basis for the development of a future Foreshore Management Plan. In June 1984, council decided that a Management Plan for the Ocean Reef Foreshore be commissioned and this would be one of the requirements needed by the EPA for approval for any future development of the site. The Ocean Reef - Foreshore Management Plan was presented to the Wanneroo Shire Council by Peter J Woods and Associates in August 1985. In October 1985, the council called for tender submissions to develop Lot 1029 at the Ocean Reef boat harbour with three submissions received and reviewed by council in February 1986 but all three failed. In December 1986, the city wrote to selected companies for submission for the site, but again in May 1987 these submission failed.

A private submission was made by the Ocean Reef Consortium to the City of Wanneroo in March 1987 for the purchase and development of part or all of Lot 1029 Ocean Reef. The city would be responsible for the rezoning and the development approvals, sought from the Western Australian government. The offer made was $1,050,000 for the land or $945,000 if the City of Wanneroo built the roads to the site. The area sought in the proposal consisted of land west of the existing boat harbour, sea sports club and sea rescue group.

The Ocean Reef Consortium's concept was for a residential concept consisting of a caravan park, holiday village and retirement village in the northwestern portion of the site. On the western side of the lot, the commercial side of the proposal consisted of a shopping centre, with supermarket, retail shops, offices fast foods, and medical centre plus a service centre and boat storage all opposite an Ocean Reef Road extension. The proposed hotel with motel units, would be on a high point close to the sea.

The retirement village would have 85 units and a community centre, a holiday village of 50 chalets, a caravan park of 185 bays with tennis courts, pool, and hall. A restaurant would be on the seaside and cater for 150 people. A lower leftover portion could be used in the future to be used as bowling and tennis clubs.

The proposed project was said to take seven years, two years for a new extension to Ocean Reef Road and an extension of Hodges Drive to the new Ocean Reef Road, stage 1 of the caravan park, a service station, boat storage, stage 1 of the chalets and retirement village. Within five years, completion of the shopping centre, retirement village, caravan and chalets area was expected with the hotel started. They also considered setting aside land for the city to erect a library.

The submission was not accepted up by the City of Wanneroo. In 1988, the council of City of Wanneroo requested a report to develop the site at the boat harbour.

The Draft: Report on a concept plan for an ocean reef recreation and tourist complex was developed in August 1988 by the City of Wanneroo's town planning department for the use of land around the current boat harbour and included land it did not own itself. For Lot 1029, owned by the City of Wanneroo, it proposed a hotel-convention of three stories, luxury holiday chalets or units, a cinema complex of 2 to 3 screens. Other things included for the site were six tennis and four squash courts, boat harbour support facilities such as chandlers, sales and fishing and sports equipment. The tourist and commercial facilities were to include small shops catering for tourists, fast food stores and offices. A public recreation and amphitheatre were to be included with an ornamental lake with grassed picnic area, botanic golf, with several restaurants but close to the sea. Lastly car and trailer parking, cycleways plus and extension to existing harbour with the possibility of two new launch ramps.

For Lot 1000, north of Lot 1029 and owned by the State Planning Commission, it was proposed that the land be used for a caravan park and another restaurant close to the sea. While Lot 1032 owned by the City of Wanneroo would be included in the proposal. Lot 1033, south of Lot 1029, and owned by the Water Authority of WA, after the completion of a second 2 km outfall pipe in 1991, it was proposed that the land above the pipelines be used for a private recreation centre with three tennis courts and swimming pool, an indoor sports stadium and health club plus car parks and another commercial tourist centre.

The last piece of land, Lot 4, owned by the State Planning Commission, as were the proposed marina be constructed south of the existing boat harbour. The proposal included a time-share resort there too.

=== 1990s ===
The City of Joondalup started discussions with the Water Corporation and Department of Transport in 1997 in regards to the transfer of the Ocean Reef boat launching facilities and groynes to the city. In 1999, the Department of Planning announced that the Bush Forever classification for some of the lots that made up the future site marina had been identified prior as a site for future tourism and recreation.

=== 2000s ===
In 2000 Turen Property Consulting had developed a report entitled Lot 1029 Ocean Reef and Boat Launching Facility: A preliminary overview of the commercial potential of the location and facilities. Later in November 2000, a decision to transfer the groyne and breakwaters from the Water Corporation and Department of Transport was approved by the City of Joondalup council as well as to engage consultants to develop structure plan and recommend a future plan for the marina and surrounding lands development. In July 2001, an Ocean Reef Development Committee was formed by the council to develop options, proposals and recommendations to develop the project further. A vegetation and flora survey started at the site in March 2002. Also in March that year, a community benchmark survey was carried out by the city to survey attitudes and expectation when it came to a future marina at the Ocean Reef site. 500 opinions were collected with 57.5% in favour of the marina development. The Ocean Reef Marina Deed of Agreement, transferring the groyne and breakwater, was signed on 22 August 2002.

In August 2005, the council approved the preparation of an Ocean Reef Structure Plan to identify what should be part of the development such as boat pens, recreation areas, natural bushland, restaurants/shops and would take eighteen months to carry out and would be conducted by Clifton Coney Stevens. The structure plan was projected to cost $1.184 million. In the lead up to the 2005 Western Australian state election, both the Labor and Liberal parties pledge funding in their election promises for a planning study for the Ocean Reef Marina with the City of Joondalup. Labor pledged $700,000 while the Liberals pledged $600,000 towards the $1.2 million study. At this stage, the marina project was set to cost $11 million.

An Ocean Reef Marina Steering Committee was established in April 2007 and comprised the CEO of the City of Joondalup and representatives of the Western Australian Planning Commission, Department for Planning & Infrastructure, LandCorp and the Water Corporation. They would discuss the ownership, planning and marine implications and boating infrastructure. The City of Joondalup also proposed the establishment of a Community Reference Group in the same month and this six-month project began in July 2007. In February 2008, a 34-person group was announced forming the Ocean Reef Marina Community Reference Group and met four times that year.

In January 2009, Concept Plan 6 was presented to the Community Reference Group. By May 2009, Concept Plan 7 had been developed, from a suggestion made from Concept Plan 6, and the council approved its release for public comment which if approved would progress towards a Structure Plan. Concept Plan 7 was released for a sixty-day public consultation in May 2009. In September 2009, the results of the public consultation were released with 11,728 surveys returned with 93.9% of those surveyed supported the Marina development. Concepts such as food and beverage outlets, boardwalk, open public spaces and a CAT bus to the site received high support while low support was received for residential apartments, helipads and heights of buildings. By December 2009, the Ocean Reef Marina Committee recommended that the council proceed with the preparation of a structure plan and business case for the Ocean Reef Marina Development.

In February 2012, the city signed a Memorandum of Understanding with the State Government as it was realised that funding of the project would need joint funding.

Previously in September 2011 an environmental and planning approval workshop was held between various state government departments and the city to develop a timeline to achieve the outcomes need to progress the project. Therefore, in December 2012 the council approved the request for the city to seek advice from the State for changes to Metropolitan Region Scheme for realignment of the Marmion Marine Park boundary and a Section 48A Environmental Protection Act environmental assessment for the Ocean Reef Marina Development. The city would submit the Ocean Reef Marina Metropolitan Region Scheme Amendment Request for changes to use of the rezoning and rationalisation of land around the current harbour and an area of water from the Marmion Marine Park.

In October 2015, the council voted in favour that the Minister for Planning of the WA State Government initiate an action for the State Government to assume the role as the lead proponent for the Ocean Reef Marina project.

Lands Minister announced in September 2016 the state government would now take control of the project and that Land Corp was expected to deliver a business plan for the marina by the end of 2016. This he said would give a clearer outline of the cost of the project. The council had approved a Memorandum of Understanding between the City of Joondalup, LandCorp and the State Government for the Ocean Reef Marina Development.

In the lead-up to the March 2017 Western Australian state election both Labor and Liberals were promising money in future budgets to ensure the Ocean Reef Marina project went ahead. The Liberals promised $105 million for marina facilities while the land facilities would be funded by Land Corp and the City of Joondalup. The Labor Party promised $40 million.

In September 2017, Premier Mark McGowan's first state budget, $120 million was committed to the Ocean Reef Marina over the lifetime of the project. $35 million would be used over four years while $5 million would be used to move the Ocean Reef Sea Sports Club and Whitfords Volunteer Sea Rescue facilities. Private sector investment was expected to be worth $500 million.

On 25 February 2019, the Environmental Protection Agency granted permission for the Ocean Reef Marina project to proceed, though strict conditions had to be met such as requirements to minimise the effect of the project on nearby beaches and improve the Marion Marine Park reefs.

On 8 October 2019 the Reserves (Marmion Marine Park) Bill 2019 passed into law and 143.0667ha of the sea bed and marine waters were excised from the Marmion Marine Park and designated as Lot 500 to allow the expansion of the Ocean Reef Boat Harbour into the Ocean Reef Marina project.

== Proposal ==
DevelopmentWA undertook a concept design review and consulted with key stakeholders and produced a preferred Concept Plan that divided the marina into four precincts.

The residential precinct will be located in the northern side of the marina project. It will have a mix of different dwelling types of high, medium and low density housing, serviced apartments or holiday-lets and open spaces. Around 1,000 dwellings are planned. The new Resolute Way extension will connect from Ocean Reef Road to this precinct.

The mixed use, waterfront, tourism and recreation precinct will be in the centre of the marina project. It will consist of retail, commercial and hospitality businesses. A boardwalk is planned to tie in the northern and southern precinct of the marina. Open spaces will be included to allow for both water activities and as well as socialising. 12,000 square metres (130,000 sq ft) of retail and commercial floorspace and more than 5 hectares (12 acres) of community spaces are planned. The new Hodges Drive extension will connect to this precinct from Ocean Reef Road.

The southern side of the marina project will be the marine enterprise precinct to accommodate services for the marina and boats including boating services, boat lifting, boat stacking, administrative offices as well as the Ocean Reef Sea Sports Club, Whitfords Volunteer Sea Rescue Group, and Marina Manager office. Around 200 boat stackers are planned. The existing Boat Harbour Quays road will connect to this precinct from Ocean Reef Road.

The marina's waterways precinct will include jetties and boat pens for recreational and commercial vessels, areas for swimming and leisure as well as the public boat launch ramps. Around 550 boat pens are planned.

WA State Government had allocated $126.5 million to the new marina to cover the life of the project. It said over $900 million of private and public sector investment is expected to be spent on the project. It expected 8,000 construction jobs will be required over the lifetime of the project and the employment of at least 900 people when the marina project is completed.

A coastal pool costing $6.5 million will also be built. A further $6.5 million will be allocated on relocating the Marine Rescue Whitfords and the Ocean Reef Sea Sports Club from their current location to the new marina facilities. The 100th Anzac Memorial Arch will also be moved from its current location to a larger space in the project and allow larger Anzac Day gatherings.

== Construction ==
=== Fauna ===
In August 2020, Terrestrial Ecosystems implemented a 5-day, 4-night relocation of fauna such as mammals and reptiles from the construction area to other coastal bushland.

=== Breakwater ===
After the clearing of the two sites in March 2021, construction of the two new breakwaters began in April 2021 with work expected to be completed in late 2022. The breakwater consists of two sections, a northern and southern construction. 2 kilometres (1.2 mi) of breakwaters will be constructed and rise about 18.5 metres (61 ft) above the seafloor. The breakwater will be constructed of granite and limestone supplied by WA Limestone in Byford and Italia Stone in Neerabup with the former starting extraction in December 2020 and the latter in February 2021. 950 thousand tonnes (2.1 billion pounds) of stone will be used at the two sites. In October 2021, the northern breakwater's length of 645 metres (2,116 ft) was completed with work continuing to raise it to 18.5 metres (61 ft) above the seafloor and the latter finished in May 2022. In January 2022, the two breakwaters finally overlapped. At least five surfing locations were destroyed forever in the process. These included surf breaks known as The Pylon, Middles, Mozzies, Geoffries and Big Rock that had been enjoyed by surfers in the northern suburbs for generations. The existing breakwaters at the Ocean Reef Boat Harbour was dismantled in March 2022.

=== Earthworks and marina ===
In August 2022, earthworks began to clear and level the area on the new marina's landside. At the same time land was to be reclaimed inside the marina and dredging the inside of the marina was to begin in October 2022. A new marina wall was to be constructed, to be built on the edge of the new reclaimed land from late 2022 or early 2023.

=== Marine rescue centre and Sea sports club ===
In May 2026, the new headquarters for Marine Rescue Whitfords, a volunteer marine rescue group, opened. Covering the coastal rescue operations from Alkimos to City Beach twenty-fours hours a day. The building has space for an operations room, training facilities, equipment space, and rooftop communication equipment.

A new Ocean Reef Sea Sports Club opened the same year and includes a restaurant, with angling, diving, sailing, and boating facilities for its members.

=== Coastal pool ===
An eight-lane 50 metre coastal pool is due to open in 2027.
