= St Stephen's School, Perth =

School in Perth, Western Australia

Coordinates: 31°49′05″S 115°46′48″E

St Stephen's School
- Perth, Western Australia; Australia

Information
- Type: Independent, co-educational, day school
- Motto: "Serve God, Serve One Another."
- Denomination: Uniting Church in Australia
- Patron saint: Saint Stephen
- Established: 1983
- Campuses: Duncraig (3-12), Carramar (K-12) & Hepburn Heights (K-2)
- Colours: Red, white & blue
- Website: ststephens.wa.edu.au

St Stephen's School is a K-12, co-educational independent, day school of the Uniting Church located on two campuses – one in Duncraig and the other in Carramar, two suburbs of Perth, Western Australia. The school is one of Western Australia's largest independent schools. The Duncraig campus opened in 1983 for Year 3 to Year 12 and the Carramar campus in Tapping opened in 2001 for Kindergarten to Year 12. In 2011 the school opened the new Early Learning Centre (ELC) in Hepburn Heights (across the road from the Duncraig campus) for Kindergarten to Year 2, introducing a Pre-Kindergarten, that takes place on Wednesdays, in the mid 2010s.

The school also owns a 115-acre (47 ha) property, the Nanga Outdoor Education Facility (referred to by the school as "The Kaadadjan Centre") consisting of bushland, field, forest and 800 metres of Murray River frontage. The property is used for school camps and retreats, leadership development and team building activities.

== History ==
The original crest of St Stephen's School, designed in 1983.

The re-designed crest of St Stephen's School, in use until 2014.

Following the inception of the Uniting Church in 1977, St Stephen's School became the first school to be established under them, with council being formed in 1981, and building beginning in 1983.

- 1983 – Foundation of the Duncraig campus
- 1993 – Opening of the primary school at Duncraig
- 2000 – Completion of the Performing Arts Centre and new administration complex
- 2001 – The school opened a second campus in Carramar.
- 2007 – Construction begins on new technology and enterprise building at Duncraig
- 2008 – Opening of new Carramar gym, named the Sports & Learning Centre
- 2009 – Opening of new technology and enterprise building at Duncraig, named the Lorraine Paul Centre and the renaming of the Design and Technology building to the Glenda Parkin Learning Centre.
- 2011 – Opening of Early Learning Centre in Hepburn Heights
- 2012 – Construction begins on extensive renovations and extensions of the Collinson Library at Duncraig
- 2013 – Re-opening of the renovated Collinson Library at Duncraig
- 2016 – Renovation of Duncraig Primary library
- 2018 – Renovation of houses at Duncraig campus
- 2021 – New educational suites unveiled, Duncraig Primary
- 2021 – Announcement of Duncraig Secondary science suite renovation
- 2023 - Renovation of houses at Carramar campus

On April 19, 2024, St. Stephen's School became the record holders for "most people launching confetti cannons simultaneously", setting the record at 2,013. The attempt included students and faculty from both campuses, with the event receiving media attention.

== Staff History ==
Period	Details
1983-1988	John Allen-Williams
1989-2003	Gavin Collinson
2003-2007	Glenda Parkin
2007-2008	Desmond Mitchell
2009-2010	Caryl Roberts
2011-2016	Tony George
2017-	Donella Beare

== Notable alumni ==
- Alex Loughton – Basketball Player
- Daniel Parker – AFL Player
- Shane Parker – AFL Player
- Alex Williams – Actor
- Daniel Stynes – Footballer
- Ben Popham - Paralympic Swimmer
