= Wanneroo Agricultural Show =

Agricultural show in Western Australia

Coordinates: 31°45′26″S 115°48′14″E

The Wanneroo Agricultural Show, or simply Wanneroo Show, is an agricultural show held on the third Friday and Saturday of November each year. It is organized by the Wanneroo Agricultural Society and held in the City of Wanneroo in the north of Perth, where it has been held since inception in 1909. Featuring competitions in agriculture, arts and crafts, photography, cooking, art, beer and wine production, and horticulture, attractions such as rides and showbags, and commercial stands.

== History ==
The first Wanneroo Show was officially opened by John Forrest on 21 April 1909, following a resolution of the Wanneroo Road Board on 7 November 1908,

that Members of the Board form themselves into a committee for the purpose of forming an Agricultural Society to promote a Show in the district.

On 24 April 1909, the Western Mail reported on the first Wanneroo Show under the heading A Successful Display, describing its events and activities. Among the invited guests attending the inaugural event were John Forrest and his wife, accompanied by several dignitaries from the state government.

There were cancellations in 1915–18 and 1940–45, and 2020 saw a reduced show because of the COVID-19 pandemic.

== The Modern Show ==
Each year the event showcases agricultural, horticultural and other associated industries available in the Wanneroo region.

=== Transport and parking ===
Limited parking at the venue has become an increasing problem. Car parking is available for attendees off Ariti Avenue in the carpark outside the main gate, plus within the grounds. However, parking on road verges around the venue and in areas adjacent to Yellagonga Regional Park is not permitted for show attendees, and the police has been known to issue infringement notices. Additional parking is available within the carpark located at the rear of the City of Wanneroo administration building off Dundebar Road with over 300 bays available, and throughout the Wanneroo town centre. A free shuttle bus operates from the City of Wanneroo administration building carpark to the venue between 6:00 pm to 10:30 pm on Friday and 3:00nbsp to 10:30 pm on Saturday.

=== Shows and performances ===
The event features stage shows (including singers, dancers and bands), field events, displays, competitions, activities and attractions on Friday evening and all day Saturday. The Wanneroo Show Idol talent competition has become a tradition at the event.

Although traditional events such as animal competitions are retained, the event has evolved towards a commercial fairground atmosphere. A wide variety of showbags and rides are on offer.

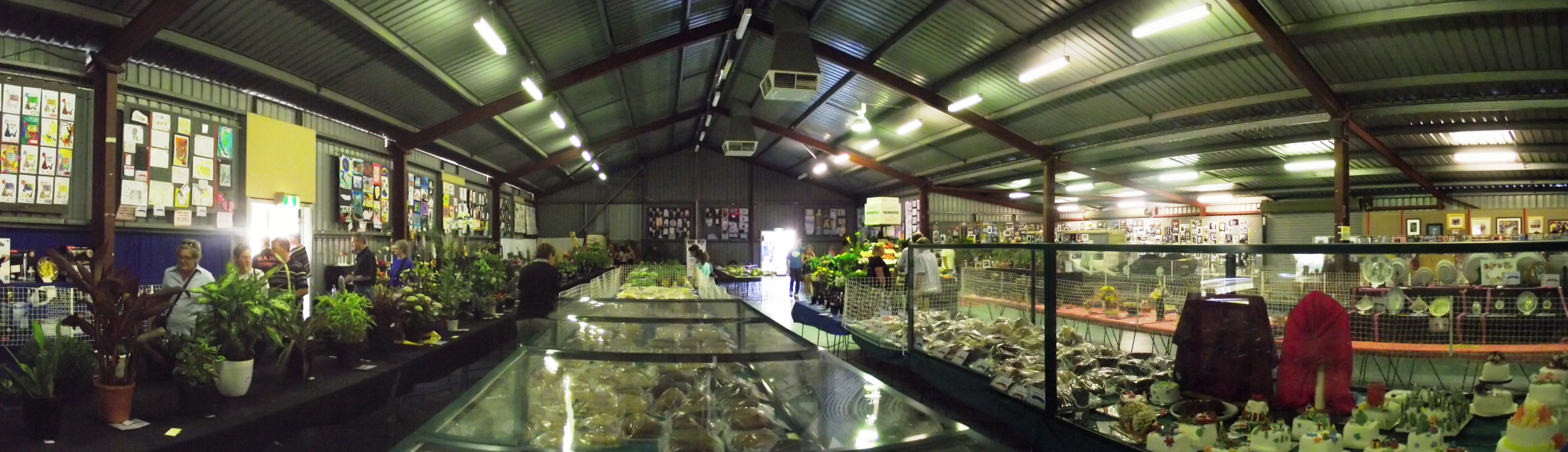
Margaret Cockman Pavilion in 2010

Each year the Margaret Cockman Pavilion hosts numerous exhibits, and a children's section awards a range of awards, prizes and trophies for best exhibits.

== Wanneroo Agricultural Society ==
The organizing body, Wanneroo Agricultural Society, has been active since 1909 and was initially created in order to assist in developing the small community of agricultural growers. This was recognized in 2009 when the show was awarded Wanneroo community event of the year.
