= Pearsall, Western Australia =

Pearsall
- Suburb
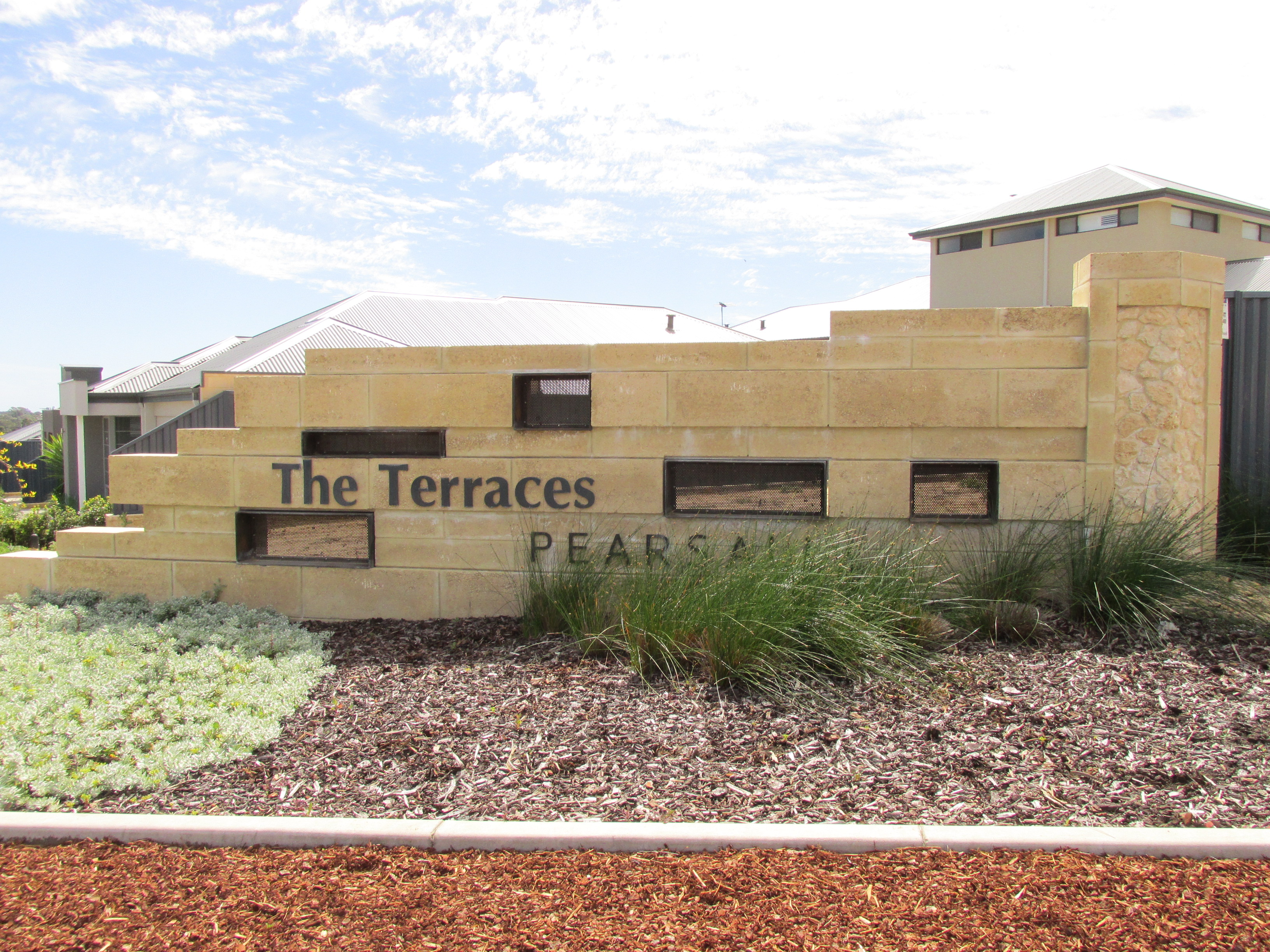
- Entrance to The Terraces Estate in Pearsall
- Interactive map of Pearsall
- Coordinates: 31.782°S 115.818°E
- Country: Australia
- State: Western Australia
- City: Perth
- LGA: City of Wanneroo

Government
  - State electorate: Landsdale
  - Federal division: Pearce

Area
  - Total: 1.5 km^{2} (0.58 sq mi)

Population
  - Total: 4,244 (SAL 2021)
- Postcode: 6065
Suburbs around Pearsall
Wanneroo	Hocking	Wanneroo
Wanneroo	Pearsall	Wanneroo
Woodvale	Wangara	Wangara

Pearsall is a suburb of Perth, Western Australia in the City of Wanneroo. Until the late 1990s it was the southernmost part of the suburb of Wanneroo.

== Local parks ==
- Covent Park (10 Busch Pkwy)
- Salitage Park (5 Salitage Link)
- Willespie Park (62 Willespie Dr)
- Voyager Park (2 Voyager Link)
- Ashbrook Park (42 Ashbrook Ave)

== Education ==
- Pearsall Primary School. Kindergarten through to Year 6. (95 Willespie Dr)

== Businesses ==
There is one main shopping complex in Pearsall, Pearsall Shopping Centre. The complex consists of Pearsall IGA, Pearsall IGA Deli, Great Kitchen Chinese Restaurant, Celebrations at Pearsall, Pearsall Medical Centre, CK's Fish Cafe and Pearsall Pharmacy.

== Transport ==
=== Bus ===
- 389 Wanneroo to Perth Busport – serves Wanneroo Road
- 467 Whitfords Station to Joondalup Station – serves East Road, Archer Street, Kemp Street and Brooklyn Avenue
- 468 Whitfords Station to Joondalup Station – serves Wanneroo Road
