= Perth's Outback Splash =

Water park in Bullsbrook, Western Australia

- Interactive map of Perth's Outback Splash
- Location: Bullsbrook, Western Australia, Australia
- Coordinates: 31.6543970°S 115.9583190°E
- Owner: Paul and Nicole Woodcock; Phil Dixon
- Opened: 1981; 45 years ago
- Previous names: The Maze Sequoia Park; Outback Splash at The Maze
- Operating season: September to April
- Status: Operating
- Pools: 2 pools
- Water slides: 9 water slides
- Children's areas: A single children's area
- Website: outbacksplash.com.au

Perth's Outback Splash is a water park located in Bullsbrook, Western Australia, approximately 34km north of Perth. It contains both wet and dry attractions including multiple water slides, a resort-style pool, mini-golf and several mazes. It is open from late September to early April.

== History ==
The park opened in 1981 as The Maze Sequoia Park (later shortened to The Maze) by Doug and Peggy Kennedy; it featured a 2500m² timber labyrinth as its main attraction which remains part of the park to this day. The park also formerly featured daily sheep shearing shows, resident kangaroos and emus, and wombats and koalas on display.

In 2006, the park was purchased by Paul and Nicole Woodcock. In 2011, management began exploring adding water based attractions to the park. Subsequently, a AUD$70 million water park expansion to be built over ten years was announced in April 2013; in addition, new food and beverage outlets, facilities and dry attractions such as new mazes and a mini-golf course would also be added to the park.

The first stage of the water park expansion, the three-storey Splash Island water slide playground, opened in December 2013. The new addition saw the wet attractions at the park branded as Outback Splash at The Maze going forward. A new hedge maze that took six years to be realised opened in July 2015. The Plummet, a 17m high inflatable water slide was opened in September 2016; the attraction would later be retired in 2024. The opening of Octopus Bay, a children's water playground with a shallow wading pool followed in December 2016. A six-storey tower with four water slides: The Wall, Blackout, Gold Rush, and The Wedgie, opened in December 2019; at the same time the entire park rebranded to its current name.

In November 2023, The Lagoon, a resort-style pool opened. In 2024, the park switched to seasonal operations; previously the dry attractions were open all year-round.
