= Hocking, Western Australia =

Hocking Perth, Western Australia
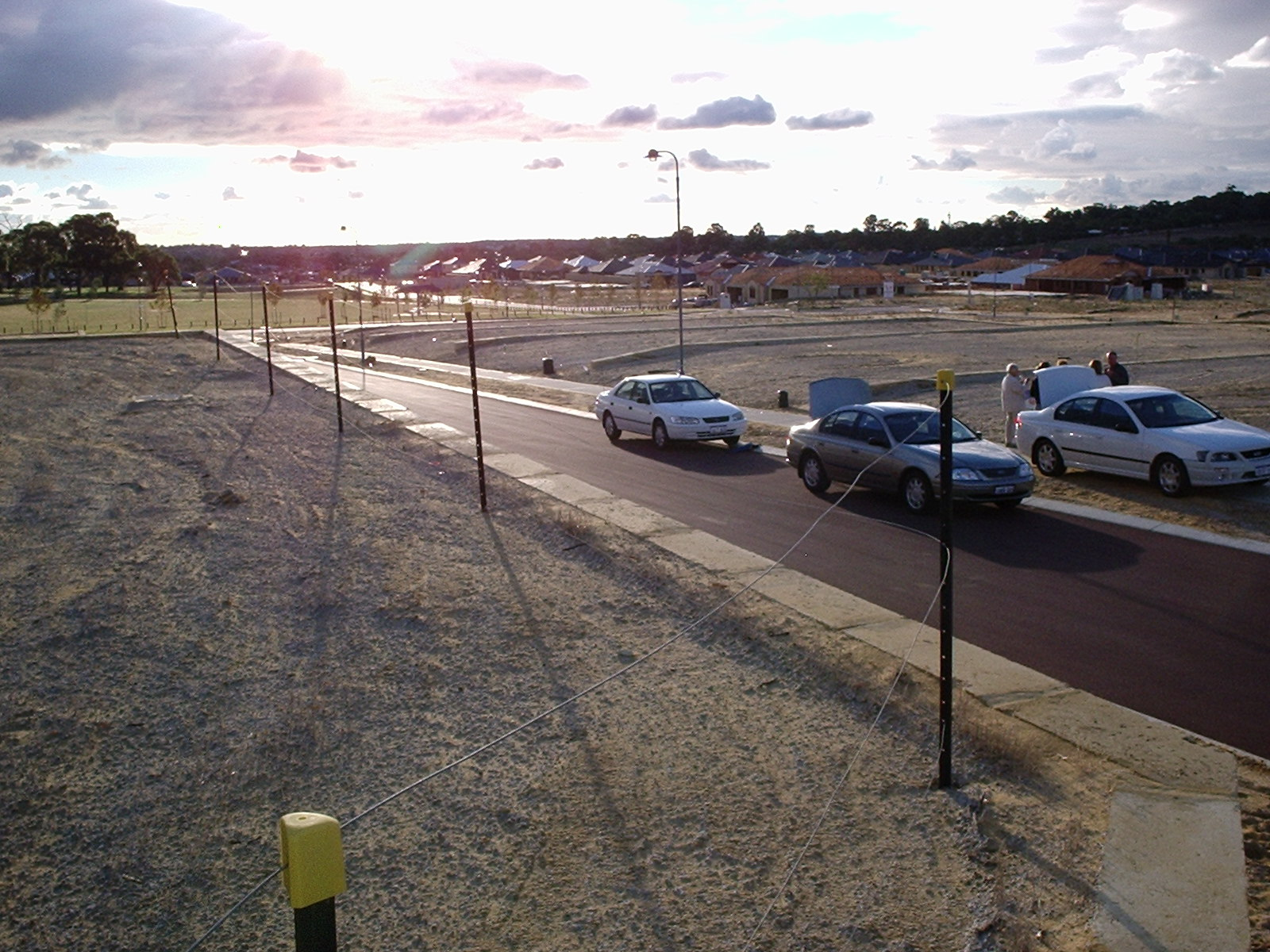
- The new land development and building activity in Belvedere Hills, Hocking
- Coordinates: 31.770°S 115.819°E
- Population: 6,987 (SAL 2021)
- Established: 1905; 120 years ago
- Postcode(s): 6065
- Area: 2.4 km^{2} (0.9 sq mi)
- Location: 23 km (14 mi) N of Perth CBD; 2 km (1 mi) S of Wanneroo
- LGA(s): City of Wanneroo
- State electorate(s): Landsdale
- Federal division(s): Pearce
Suburbs around Hocking:
	Wanneroo
Wanneroo	Hocking	Wanneroo
	Pearsall

Hocking is a suburb of Perth, Western Australia, located within the City of Wanneroo. Until 1994 it was part of the suburb of Wanneroo. The suburb was named after Herbert Hocking, a local landowner, first chairman of the Wanneroo Road Board and member of the Board from 1903 to 1931. He was also treasurer of the Agricultural Society in 1909.

The suburb is home to many new houses on Hinckley Parkway in the east of the suburb, much vacant land under development, as well as remnant market gardens. The primary new housing estate is Belvedere Hills.

== Parks ==
- Gungurru Park (Gungurru Dr)
- Chesterfield Park (Chesterfield Ave)
- Amery Park (Amery Rd)
- Bembridge Park (Manchester Dr)
- Hinckley Park (Hinckley Pkwy)
- Greenfields Park (Elliot Rd)

== Education ==
Hocking contains two public schools: Hocking Primary School, which was opened in 2008 and provides education from kindergarten through to Year 6. The other school is St. Elizabeth's Catholic Primary School, which opened in 2014 and provides education from Pre-Kindy to Year 6.

Hocking does not have a high school, with secondary education being provided by the school in Hocking's catchment, Wanneroo Senior High School.

== Transport ==
=== Bus ===
- 467 Joondalup Station to Whitfords Station – serves Elliot Road, Wyatt Road, Chatsworth Drive and East Road
- 468 Joondalup Station to Whitfords Station – serves Wanneroo Road
