= Sinagra, Western Australia =

Sinagra
- Suburb
- Interactive map of Sinagra
- Coordinates: 31.741°S 115.807°E
- Country: Australia
- State: Western Australia
- City: Perth
- LGA: City of Wanneroo

Government
  - State electorate: Wanneroo
  - Federal division: Pearce

Population
  - Total: 3,100 (SAL 2021)
- Postcode: 6065
Suburbs around Sinagra
| Ashby | Mariginiup | Mariginiup |
| Ashby | Sinagra | Wanneroo |
| Wanneroo | Wanneroo | Wanneroo |

Sinagra is an outer northern suburb of Perth, Western Australia, located within the City of Wanneroo.

This suburb, formerly part of the suburb of Wanneroo, is named after the Sinagra family, migrants from Italy who arrived in the Wanneroo area in the 1920s. The City of Wanneroo established a sister city relationship with Sinagra, Sicily as a large number of families migrated from there to make a new home in Wanneroo. Sam Sinagra owned a shop in Wanneroo, and the family were prominent citizens. The suburb name was approved on 3 April 1995.

== Transport ==
Until February 2026, there were no bus routes directly serving the suburb, with only routes 467 and 468 operating along the western edge on Wanneroo Road, while routes 389 and 467 also operated along the southern edge on Dundebar Road. As of 1 February 2026, route 467 was realigned to travel via Illyarrie Rise, Geranium Drive, Vincent Road, San Teodoro Avenue, and Caporn Street, entering Ashby next to The Ashby Village shops.

=== Bus ===
- 389 Wanneroo to Perth Busport – serves Dundebar Road
- 467 Joondalup Station to Whitfords Station – serves Wanneroo Road,Dundebar Road, Illyarrie Rise and San Teodoro Avenue
- 468 Joondalup Station to Whitfords Station – serves Wanneroo Road
