= Tapping, Western Australia =

Tapping Perth, Western Australia
- Coordinates: 31.719°S 115.795°E
- Population: 9,547 (SAL 2021)
- Postcode(s): 6065
- Area: 1.2 km^{2} (0.5 sq mi)
- Location: 27 km (17 mi) N of Perth CBD
- LGA(s): City of Wanneroo
- State electorate(s): Wanneroo
- Federal division(s): Pearce
Suburbs around Tapping:
Neerabup	Carramar	Banksia Grove
Joondalup	Tapping	Mariginiup
Ashby	Ashby	Mariginiup

Tapping is a suburb of Perth, Western Australia, located within the City of Wanneroo. It came into being in the early 1990s as a subdivision of Wanneroo, originally as part of the Carramar estate.

Tapping was chosen as the suburb name in honour of an early settler family in the Wanneroo area. William Tapping arrived in 1886, and Molly and Dolly Tapping were long time postmistresses in Wanneroo. The name for the suburb was approved in 1997.

== Geography ==
Tapping is bounded by Joondalup Drive to the north, Pinjar Road to the east, Conti Road to the south, and Wanneroo Road to the west.

== Demographics ==
In the 2011 census, Tapping had a population of 8,946, an increase in comparison to the 2001 census, which had the population at 229. This increase can be directly attributed to continued housing development within the suburb on previously undeveloped land previously used for farming and horticulture activities. The median age of Tapping residents was 30, and median individual incomes were $831 per week. 0.8% of the population identified themselves as Indigenous persons.

The most common religious affiliation was "No Religion" (25.3%); the next most common responses were Anglican (23.7%), Catholic (22.0%), and Uniting Church (3.6%).

== Education ==
Tapping contains one private school, St Stephen's School, Carramar Campus, an extension of the original St Stephens School in Duncraig. The school supports both primary and secondary education. Tapping also has two public schools: Tapping Primary School, which opened at the start of 2007, and Spring Hill Primary School, which opened in 2011. Both schools provide education from kindergarten through to Year 6.

Tapping does not contain a public high school. High school studies are provided through Wanneroo Senior High School and Kinross College.

== Transport ==
The suburb is served by bus routes that provide connections to the Yanchep line via either Whitfords or Joondalup railway stations.

=== Bus ===
- 390 Joondalup Station to Banksia Grove – serves Wanneroo Road, Clarkson Avenue, Yandella Promenade and Pinjar Road
- 467 Joondalup Station to Whitfords Station – serves Joondalup Drive, Waldburg Drive and Carosa Road
- 468 Joondalup Station to Whitfords Station – serves Wanneroo Road

== 2023 fire ==
The suburb was seriously affected by the 2023 Wanneroo bushfire.
