= Ashby, Western Australia =

Ashby
- Suburb
- Interactive map of Ashby
- Coordinates: 31.733°S 115.798°E
- Country: Australia
- State: Western Australia
- City: Perth
- LGA: City of Wanneroo
- Location: 26 km (16 mi) N of Perth CBD
- Established: 1990s

Government
  - State electorate: Wanneroo
  - Federal division: Pearce

Area
  - Total: 1.5 km^{2} (0.58 sq mi)

Population
  - Total: 2,850 (SAL 2021)
- Postcode: 6065
Suburbs around Ashby
Wanneroo	Tapping	Mariginiup
Wanneroo	Ashby	Sinagra
Wanneroo	Wanneroo	Sinagra

Ashby is a suburb of Perth, the capital city of Western Australia 26 kilometres (16 mi) north of Perth's central business district. Its local government area is the City of Wanneroo.

The suburb came into being in the late 1990s as a subdivision of Wanneroo, and was named in 1997 after a local landowner, Mr E E Ashby, who owned land in the area in 1913.

== Geography ==
Ashby is a triangular suburb and is bounded by Wanneroo Road to the southwest, Pinjar Road to the southeast and Conti Road to the north. About 40% of the suburb has been developed for residential purposes.

== Transport ==
Transperth bus route 467 operates through the suburb via Carosa Road, Mondrian Approach, Fomiatti Street, and Hollosy Way, passing The Ashby Village shops. Until 1 February 2026, the route travelled along Carosa Road all the way to Pinjar Road, with two paris of stops near Siena Link and Elton Park removed as part of the route realignment enabling the route to serve the adjacent suburb of Singara. Route 468 operates along the western edge of the suburb on Wanneroo Road.

=== Bus ===
- 467 Joondalup Station to Whitfords Station – serves Carosa Road, Mondrian Approach, Fomiatti Street, and Hollosy Way
- 468 Joondalup Station to Whitfords Station – serves Wanneroo Road
