= Heathridge, Western Australia =

Heathridge
- Suburb
- Interactive map of Heathridge
- Coordinates: 31.759°S 115.761°E
- Country: Australia
- State: Western Australia
- City: Perth
- LGA: City of Joondalup
- Location: 26 km (16 mi) from Perth
- Established: 1976

Government
  - State electorate: Joondalup
  - Federal division: Moore

Area
  - Total: 3.8 km^{2} (1.5 sq mi)

Population
  - Total: 6,898 (SAL 2021)
- Postcode: 6027
Suburbs around Heathridge
Ocean Reef	Connolly	Joondalup
Ocean Reef	Heathridge	Edgewater
Mullaloo	Beldon	Craigie

Heathridge is a suburb of Perth, Western Australia, located 33 kilometres (21 mi) south of Yanchep within the City of Joondalup.

== Etymology ==
Heathridge was chosen as the suburb name because of the heath type vegetation growing on the sand ridges of the area, as well as its isolation from the Perth central business district.

== History ==
Prior to urban settlement in the 1970s, Heathridge was a remote and undeveloped area. It represented the central and eastern portions of Lot M1513 and the northeastern corner of Lot M1506 on Swan Location 1370. The name Heathridge, chosen for the ground-cover vegetation growing on the sand ridges in the area, was first proposed by the developer, Kaiser Aetna, and was accepted by the government's Nomenclature Advisory Committee on 8 November 1974. It was officially gazetted in October 1975.

The suburb started to develop in 1976, with the first land sales in the area bounded by Caridean Street to the north, Admiral Grove to the east, Ocean Reef Road to the south, and Marmion Ave via Mermaid Way and Poseidon Road to the west. The Metropolitan Region Planning Authority rezoned the north and east of the suburb in 1978 for urban development, and land progressively became available throughout the suburb in the 1980s, particularly in the Heathridge Heights area bounded by Hodges Drive to the North, Caridean Street and Poseidon Road to the East, Mermaid Way to the South, and Marmion Avenue to the West. Sales for this estate were handled from the now long departed Ocean Reef Sales Office, that resided on the site now occupied by private residences and a petrol station at Marina Boulevard and Marmion Avenue in Ocean Reef.

More recently, a number of previously unoccupied areas in the suburb's northern and western areas were developed in the late 1990s.

== Geography ==
Heathridge is bounded by Hodges Drive to the north, the Mitchell Freeway to the East, Ocean Reef Road to the south, and Marmion Avenue to the West.

== Demographics ==
In the 2016 census, Heathridge had a population of 6,661; 50.5% male and 49.5% female. The median age of Heathridge residents was 34, and median weekly personal income was $742. 1% of the population identified themselves as Indigenous persons.

== Religion ==
The most popular religious affiliations in descending order in the 2016 census were No Religion 39.4%, Catholic 19.5%, Anglican 15.1%, Not Stated 8.3% and Christian, nfd 3.4%. Christianity was the largest religious group reported overall (52.1%) (this figure excludes not stated responses).

== Economy ==
=== Retail ===
Other facilities within the suburb include the Heathridge Shopping Centre, with restaurants, grocery and liquor stores, on Caridean Street near Admiral Grove.

== Governance ==
The suburb of Heathridge falls under the local government of the City of Joondalup and is represented by two councillors from the North Central Ward. The current councillors are Denise Mercer and Nige Jones. At state parliament level, Heathridge is represented in the Western Australian Legislative Assembly by a member from Joondalup electoral district. The suburb first participated in the 1980 state election. The current member is Emily Hamilton. In the Australian federal parliament, the suburb is part of the Division of Moore and is currently represented by member, Tom French.

2004 federal election Source: AEC
Liberal	43.4%
Labor	39.6%
Greens	8.73%
One Nation	3.11%
CDP	2.68%

2001 federal election Source: AEC
Liberal	44.5%
Labor	35.7%
One Nation	6.26%
Greens	5.89%
Democrats	5.36%

2005 state election Source: WAEC
Labor	48.7%
Liberal	32.7%
Greens	7.98%
Independent	4.47%
Family First	3.89%

Independent candidate: Nurses for Health

2001 state election Source: WAEC
Labor	43.5%
Liberal	30.4%
Greens	10.4%
One Nation	7.85%
CDP	3.35%

== Amenities ==
=== Parks ===
The suburb has several general parks such as Captain, Whitmore, Balanus, Larkspur and the Poseiden Reserve. The others serve as multi-purpose parks. At the southernmost end of the suburb is Heathridge Park the Heathridge Community Centre, operated by the City of Joondalup. This includes indoor basketball courts, grassed level oval, tennis courts, education rooms, and child minding facilities. Additionally, the site is home to the Ocean Ridge Cricket Club and Ocean Ridge Amateur Football Club.

This oval, along with Prince Regent Park, Admiral Park, and Littorina Park have large grass outdoor ovals designed for used by schools, community groups and sporting activities including cricket, Australian rules football, and association football. There is also the Granny Spiers Community Centre on Poseidon Road, run by a not-for-profit group undertaking various community and disabled outreach and assistance programs.

=== Religious facilities ===
There are three dedicated houses of worship, belonging to the Church of Jesus Christ of Latter-day Saints, the Salvation Army, and a Pentecostal Anglican group. Other religious groups meet in various locations around the suburb.

== Infrastructure ==
=== Transport ===
The suburb is well served by a number of transport options including rail and bus links.

==== Bus ====
- 461 Joondalup Station to Whitfords Station – serves Marmion Avenue
- 462 Joondalup Station to Whitfords Station – serves Hodges Drive and Marmion Avenue
- 463 Joondalup Station to Whitfords Station – serves Hodges Drive, Caridean Street, Poseidon Road, Peninsula Avenue and Admiral Grove
- 464 Joondalup Station to Whitfords Station – serves Hodges Drive, Caridean Street, Eddystone Avenue and Ocean Reef Road

==== Rail ====
- Yanchep line
  - Edgewater Station

The nearest train station is Edgewater Train Station. "The Joondalup train line is the second busiest heavy rail route in the metropolitan area, with the Mandurah Line experiencing the highest patronage", Transport Minister Dean Nalder said.

A new $29.5 million multi-storey car park at Edgewater Station is on track for completion by the end of 2016. Construction of the 1,450 bay car park started earlier this year and the project, which will deliver 560 new bays at Edgewater Station, is about 70 per cent complete.

== Education ==
=== Schools ===
Heathridge is currently served by three primary schools offering K–6 education. The first of these is Heathridge Primary School, constructed towards the end of the 1970s and opened in 1980. In 1986, a further two primary schools opened in the suburb, including Eddystone Primary School with a primary student catchment area of the Eastern side of Heathridge as well as students from the surrounding suburbs of Beldon, Craigie, and Edgewater. Poseidon Primary School opened that same year with a catchment area of Heathridge's west side including surrounding areas of Connolly, Ocean Reef, and Beldon. With the opening of the two schools, Heathridge Primary School became responsible for the central area of the suburb, bounded by Admiral Grove in the East and Poseidon Road in the West.

The suburb is also served by two high schools offering Years 7–12, although both of these high schools reside outside the suburb. Ocean Reef Senior High School was responsible for Year 7–12 education for the suburb from its inception until 1990, when Belridge Secondary College opened for Year 8 students. Belridge was primarily opened to reduce overall demand at Ocean Reef due to high demand for its advanced programs and its inability to take students from within its primary catchment area. From its opening in 1990 until 1995, Belridge progressively expanded its age range until becoming a full secondary school in 1995 when the first class of graduating Year Twelve students commenced their studies.
