= Carramar, Western Australia =

Carramar
- Suburb
- Interactive map of Carramar
- Coordinates: 31.7°S 115.786°E
- Country: Australia
- State: Western Australia
- City: Perth
- LGA: City of Wanneroo
- Location: 30 km (19 mi) N of Perth CBD
- Established: 1995

Government
  - State electorate: Wanneroo
  - Federal division: Pearce

Area
  - Total: 6.7 km^{2} (2.6 sq mi)

Population
  - Total: 7,178 (SAL 2021)
- Postcode: 6031
Suburbs around Carramar
| Neerabup | Neerabup | Neerabup |
| Neerabup | Carramar | Banksia Grove |
| Wanneroo | Tapping | Tapping |

Carramar is a suburb of Perth, Western Australia, located within the City of Wanneroo and it is situated 30 km from the Perth CBD. Its postcode is 6031, and it came into being, together with Tapping to the south, in 1995 as a subdivision of Neerabup.

Carramar is an Aboriginal word meaning "shade of trees", and was approved as a suburb name in 1997.

== Geography ==
Carramar is bounded by Flynn Drive to the north, Pinjar Road to the east, Joondalup Drive to the south, and Wanneroo Road to the west.

== Demographics ==
In the 2011 census, Carramar had a population of 6,605, an increase in comparison to the 2001 census, which had the population at 2,497. This increase can be directly attributed to increased housing development within the suburb on previously undeveloped land. The median age of Carramar residents was 32, and median household income was $1,964 per week. 0.4% of the population identified themselves as Indigenous persons.

The most popular religious affiliations in descending order in the 2011 census were Anglican 25.7%, No Religion 24.3%, Catholic 22.6%, Uniting Church 3.7% and Baptist 2.8%.

== Facilities ==
The suburb has a park and sporting oval located on its Southern border at Millendon Street between Houghton and Cheriton Drives. Also located in this same area is the local Community Centre constructed and operated by the local council opened in May 2006.

In 1994, the Carramar Golf Course was opened by the City of Wanneroo. The Bob Stanton designed facility is a par 72, 6121 metre course carved into a native Australian bushland surrounding.

=== Retail facilities ===
Two sites within the suburb are zoned for retail facilities. The first is the Carramar Village Shopping Centre located in the area bounded by Joondalup Drive, Rawlinna Parkway, and Cheriton Drive on the suburb's southern boundary. The site is owned by the estate's land developer Peet Limited and opened for trading in March 2009. The second site is zoned regional shopping centre and is located on a parcel of land to the north of the intersection at Joondalup Drive and Pinjar Road.

The issue of shopping facilities within the Carramar Estate had been a source of constant discontent between residents, the local residents association, and the land developer. Amongst the delays cited were the tendering process for a land release in the adjoining suburb of Banksia Grove which would have led them to instead develop the regional shopping centre site, and complaints regarding the approvals process of the City of Wanneroo which have been strenuously denied by Central Ward Councillors Sam Salpietro (Also Deputy Mayor) and Frank Civitan.

== Education ==
A new primary school, Carramar Primary School, opened on 2 February 2005.

High School studies are provided through Joseph Banks Secondary College. A number of students also attend St Stephen's School in the neighbouring suburb of Tapping for private primary and secondary education.

== Sport ==
Carramar Cougars are the local football club based at Houghton Park, Carramar, opposite the Carramar Village Shopping Centre.

== Transport ==
The suburb is served by bus routes that provide connections to the Yanchep line via either Whitfords or Joondalup railway stations.

=== Bus ===
- 391 Joondalup Station to Banksia Grove – serves Wanneroo Road, Golf Links Drive, Houghton Drive, Millendon Street and Keanefield Drive
- 467 Joondalup Station to Whitfords Station – serves Joondalup Drive
