= Mariginiup, Western Australia =

Mariginiup
- Suburb
- Interactive map of Mariginiup
- Coordinates: 31.712°S 115.837°E
- Country: Australia
- State: Western Australia
- City: Perth
- LGA: City of Wanneroo

Government
  - State electorate: Wanneroo
  - Federal division: Pearce

Population
  - Total: 876 (SAL 2021)
- Postcode: 6078
Suburbs around Mariginiup
| Banksia Grove | Pinjar | Melaleuca |
| Tapping | Mariginiup | Melaleuca |
| Ashby / Sinagra | Wanneroo | Jandabup |

Mariginiup is an outer northern suburb of Perth, Western Australia, located within the City of Wanneroo.

The suburb was seriously affected by the 2023 Wanneroo bushfire.
