= Wanneroo Road =

Road in Perth, Western Australia

Wanneroo Road Western Australia
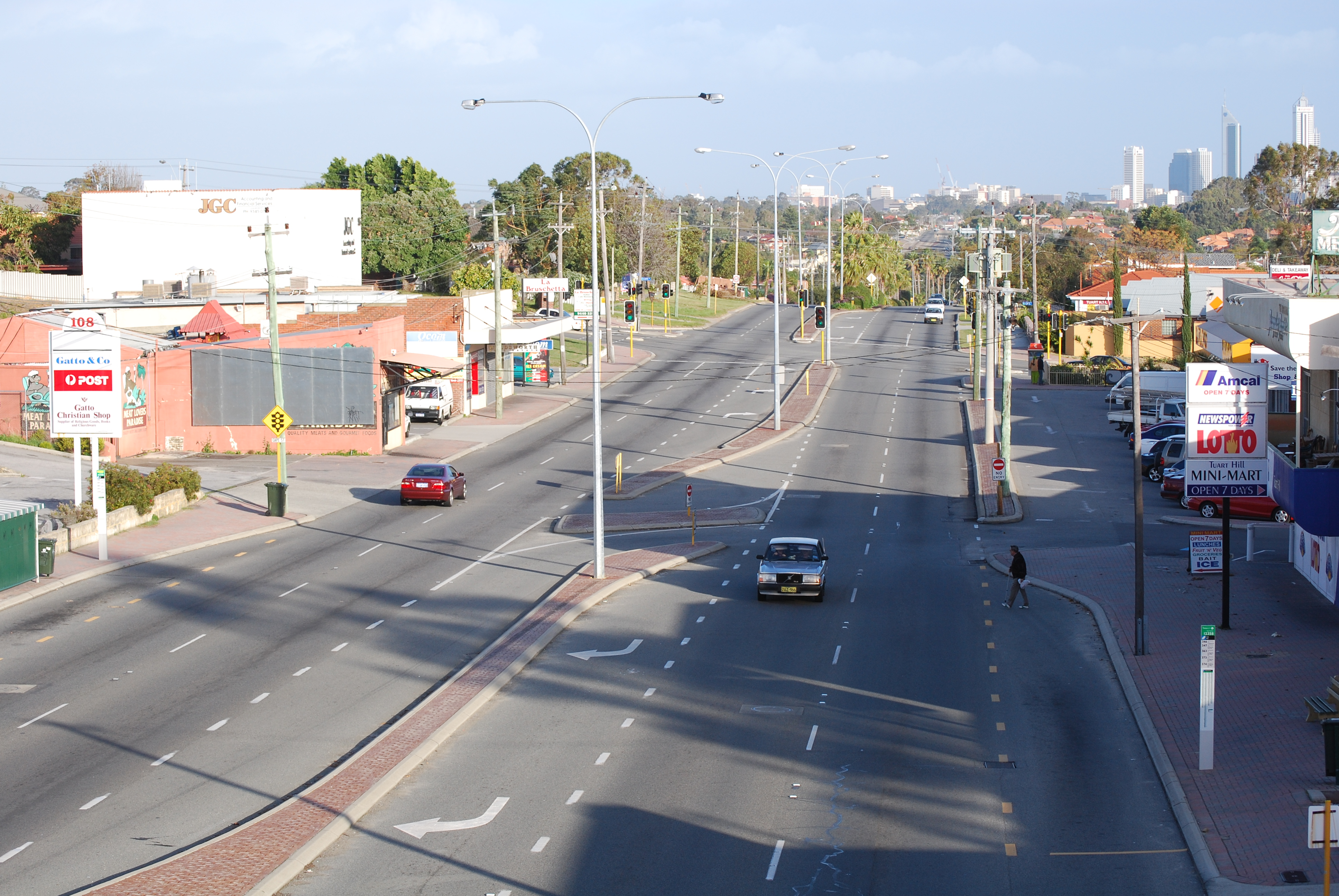
- Looking south, towards Perth in Tuart Hill

General information
- Type: Highway
- Length: 43.6 km (27 mi)
- Opened: 1920s
- Route number(s): State Route 60

Major junctions
- South end: Charles Street, (State Route 60), Joondanna
- Morley Drive (State Route 76); Reid Highway (State Route 3); Yanchep Beach Road
- North end: Indian Ocean Drive (State Route 60), Yanchep

Location(s)
- Major suburbs: Tuart Hill, Wanneroo, Yanchep

Highway system
- Highways in Australia; National Highway • Freeways in Australia; Highways in Western Australia

Wanneroo Road is a 44-kilometre (27 mi) arterial highway in the northern suburbs of Perth, Western Australia linking Joondanna and Yokine in the south with Wanneroo and Yanchep in the north. As part of State Route 60, it begins from Charles Street in the inner city and becomes Indian Ocean Drive up to Dongara.

Originally a narrow and often country road with a single lane in each direction it has been periodically widened and (particularly north of Wanneroo) straightened. Around the Carabooda area the road has been realigned. Short sections of the original, narrow road remain providing access to properties and businesses along the road.

The road is also multiplexed with State Routes 81 and 83 for short lengths.

== Route description ==
Wanneroo Road is part of State Route 60, as an alternative route to the Mitchell Freeway (State Route 2) in Perth's northern suburbs. The road's southern terminus is London Street (State Route 61) in Joondanna, where it continues southwards as Charles Street, and its northern terminus is at Yanchep Beach Road in Yanchep, where it continues northwards as Indian Ocean Drive. Maintained by Main Roads Western Australia, the road is mostly a four-lane dual carriageway (except within Balcatta where it is six lanes), namely south of Dunstan Road as well as a short section in Carabooda between Trian Road and Bernard Road South, with the remainder in the outer rural northern suburbs a two-lane single carriageway.

The speed limit is predominantly 70 km/h (43 mph); however, it is 60 km/h (37 mph) south of Royal Street in Tuart Hill and within the Wanneroo Town Centre, 80 km/h (50 mph) north of Neerabup Road in Neerabup, and then 90 km/h (56 mph) north of Hester Avenue until its terminus in Yanchep.

From its southern terminus to Beach Road, the road is within the City of Stirling local government area (LGA), after which it forms the boundary between the City of Joondalup and Wanneroo LGAs — this remains as such until Whitfords Avenue, where it is exclusively within the City of Wanneroo for the remainder of its length.

=== Joondanna to Wanneroo ===
Wanneroo Road starts as the continuation of Charles Street from the south at the traffic light Y-intersection at London Street. Commencing within the City of Stirling, it straddles along the suburbs of Joondanna, Tuart Hill, and Yokine, encountering traffic light controlled intersections of Cape and Royal Streets. The first intersection with a major road is with Morley Drive, 2.5 km (1.6 mi) later.

North of Morley Drive, it travels through the suburbs of Balcatta, Westminster, and Nollamara, during which it encounters traffic light controlled intersections at Nollamara Avenue, Amelia Street, Main Street, Balcatta Road, and Victoria Road/Halley Road, eventually reaching a diamond interchange with Reid Highway following a 3.5 km (2.2 mi) run along the aforementioned suburbs. Reid Highway runs uninterrupted under Wanneroo Road, where both ramp junctions are controlled by traffic lights.

Wanneroo Road travels along the suburbs of Hamersley to the west of the road and Balga to the east, reaching a traffic light controlled intersection with Beach Road 1.9 km (1.2 mi) later. Following this intersection the road forms the boundaries of both the City of Joondalup and Wanneroo LGAs. Wanneroo Road then travels through numerous residential suburbs, including Girrawheen and Madeley, for 4.8 km (3.0 mi) on approach to the industrial suburb of Wangara, intersecting with traffic lights at Warwick Road, Marangaroo Drive, Hepburn Avenue (near the Kingsway City Shopping Centre), Kingsway, Gnangara Road and Whitfords Avenue. Because the T-junctions at Warwick Road and Marangaroo Drive are located within a close distance of each other, Wanneroo Road also carries State Route 81 between those two roads. A similar situation exists with Gnangara Road and Whitfords Avenue, except the short stretch between the two intersections carries State Route 83.

After Whitfords Avenue, the road is exclusively within the City of Wanneroo, travelling along the industrial suburb of Wangara to the east and Woodvale to the west for around 2 km (1.2 mi), where there is evidence of new residential developments. Within Wangara a traffic light controlled T-junction with Prindiville Drive is encountered, before reaching Ocean Reef Road, which is a grade-separated interchange with Wanneroo Road free-flowing over traffic light junctions at Ocean Reef Road.

North of Ocean Reef Road, Wanneroo Road travels along the residential suburbs of Pearsall and Hocking for around 2.5 km (1.6 mi) before entering the Wanneroo town centre. Running within the town centre for 1.7 km (1.1 mi) it intersects with Conlan Avenue/Hastings Street (providing access to Wanneroo Central Shopping Centre) and Dundebar Road. The road then travels through the residential suburbs of Sinagra, Ashby, and Tapping for 4.1 km (2.5 mi), during which it intersects with Pinjar Road and Wallawa Street at traffic light T-junctions, and eventually reaches Joondalup Drive. Like Ocean Reef Road, this is a grade-separated interchange, but in a roundabout interchange configuration and Joondalup Drive free-flowing over the Wanneroo Road roundabout.

=== North of Wanneroo ===
After Joondalup Drive, development starts to become more sparse, and transitions from a suburban to rural landscape. Wanneroo Road travels through predominantly bushland in Neerabup (and along some residential development in Carramar) before reaching a traffic light controlled intersection with Flynn Drive and Neerabup Road 3.5 km (2.2 mi) later. The road continues to travel through Neerabup for 3.1 km (1.9 mi) before reaching a traffic light controlled T-junction with Hester Avenue. Within that stretch, alongside the road are portions of the original, narrow road that are now access roads for businesses and properties along the route. Now within the suburb of Nowergup, the road reduces to a two-lane single carriageway 2.6 km (1.6 mi) north of that intersection, which continues as such until 400 m (0.25 mi) south of the intersection with Romeo and Karoborup Roads where a four-lane single carriageway reappears. The intersection, on the boundary between Nowergup and Carabooda, is the northernmost signalised intersection on Wanneroo Road, with Romeo Road currently providing the northernmost link to both the Mitchell Freeway and fellow arterial road Marmion Avenue.

The dual carriage way continues as such for 4.3 km (2.7 mi) until Bernard Road South, reducing to a single carriageway once again. After about 4 km (2.5 mi), Wanneroo Road terminates at a T-junction with Yanchep Beach Road, with the road (and State Route 60) continuing northwards as Indian Ocean Drive to coastal localities beyond the northern limit of the Perth metropolitan area (namely in the Wheatbelt region), such as Lancelin, Cervantes, and Jurien Bay. Indian Ocean Drive would eventually reach Brand Highway as the main route northwards to Geraldton.

== History ==
After the enactment of the Road Districts Act 1871, the Perth Road Board requested that the Legislative Council proclaim eight public thoroughfares through its territory, and on 4 June 1872, Road No.3, intended as a route from Perth to Champion Bay (now Geraldton) via Wanneroo, was published in the Western Australian Government Gazette. However, the act of proclaiming the road was not contiguous with its development, and progress on surfacing the track occurred at a slow rate.

A proposal to rename the road as the Yanchep Highway was made in November 1940. The Perth Road Board (now City of Stirling) was in favour of the proposal, subject to the Wanneroo Road Board (now City of Wanneroo) renaming their portion of Wanneroo Road, but the Wanneroo Road Board indicated that they would support a name change if it included Charles Street, in the Perth City Council area. No agreement was reached.

The road represented the western terminus of the eastern section of Reid Highway between 1994 and 1996, when Reid Highway's missing link eventually made it continuous in 1996.

In 2008, the intersection with Ocean Reef Road (SR84) was upgraded. A second left turn lane was added for drivers entering Ocean Reef Road westbound from Wanneroo Road from the north, a second right turn lane to enter Ocean Reef Road westbound, and a second left and right turn lane at Ocean Reef Road westbound.

During 2010, Wanneroo Road was duplicated from Wallawa Street to Joondalup Drive. In 2013, traffic lights were installed at Hester Avenue, which was later duplicated in 2017 as part of the Mitchell Freeway extension works.

In December 2010, the state's Geographic Names Committee, on behalf of the Shire of Gingin, requested that the City of Wanneroo rename the northern section of Wanneroo Road to Indian Ocean Drive. A motion was put forward at the 14 December 2010 council meeting to rename the section from Yanchep Beach Road north to the intersection of Gingin Brook Road, reasoning that terminating Wanneroo Road at Yanchep National Park would "be good for tourism". However, Mayor Jon Kelly considered the proposal a "futile and worthless exercise that was tantamount to heresy". Other councillors called it "offensive to the pioneers" of Wanneroo, and wished to retain the name Wanneroo in the area's only main road. An alternative motion stating that the council "does not agree" to renaming the road was passed instead. However, a subsequent renaming request was passed and the name Indian Ocean Drive was extended down to Yanchep Beach Road in 2011.

During 2016 and 2019, significant portions of the road north of Joondalup Drive were duplicated: the section between Flynn Drive and north of Hall Road during 2016 and 2017 as part of the Mitchell Freeway extension works, and then the section between Joondalup Drive and the Flynn Drive/Neerabup Road intersection between 2018 and 2019. Work also started in 2018 to convert the existing traffic light intersections with Ocean Reef Road and Joondalup Drive to grade-separated interchanges, with work completed in April 2019.

== Junctions ==
LGA	Location	km	mi	Destinations	Notes
Stirling	Joondanna–Yokine boundary	0.0	0.0	London Street (State Route 61) – Leederville, Subiaco, Nedlands southwest / Charles Street (State Route 60) – North Perth, Northbridge southeast	Wanneroo Road terminus; road continues south as Charles Street; Traffic light controlled y-junction
Stirling	Tuart Hill–Yokine boundary	1.0	0.62	Cape Street – Yokine, Tuart Hill, Osborne Park	Traffic light controlled intersection
Stirling	Tuart Hill–Yokine boundary	1.6	0.99	Royal Street – Yokine, Tuart Hill, Osborne Park	Traffic light controlled intersection
Stirling	Tuart Hill–Yokine–Balcatta–Nollamara quadripoint	2.5	1.6	Morley Drive (State Route 76) – Karrinyup, Stirling, Morley	Traffic light controlled intersection
Stirling	Balcatta–Nollamara boundary	3.2	2.0	Nollamara Avenue – Nollamara, Mirrabooka	Traffic light controlled t-junction
Stirling	Balcatta–Nollamara–Westminster tripoint	4.3	2.7	Amelia Street – Balcatta, Westminster, Mirrabooka	Traffic light controlled intersection
Stirling	Balcatta–Westminster boundary	4.9	3.0	Main Street – Balcatta, Osborne Park	Traffic light controller t-junction
Stirling	Balcatta–Westminster boundary	5.5	3.4	Balcatta Road (State Route 77) – Balcatta	Traffic light controlled t-junction
Stirling	Balcatta–Westminster boundary	5.7	3.5	Halley Road – Balcatta west / Victoria Road – Westminster east	Traffic light controlled intersection
Stirling	Balcatta–Westminster–Hamersley–Balga quadripoint	6.0	3.7	Reid Highway (State Route 3) – North Beach, Morley, Midland	Diamond interchange
Stirling–Joondalup–Wanneroo tripoint	Hamersley–Balga–Warwick–Girrawheen quadripoint	7.9	4.9	Beach Road – Carine, Malaga, Dayton	Traffic light controlled intersection
Joondalup–Wanneroo boundary	Warwick–Girrawheen–Greenwood–Marangaroo quadripoint	8.9	5.5	Warwick Road (State Route 81) – Warwick, Duncraig	State Route 81 southern concurrency terminus; Traffic light controlled t-junction
Joondalup–Wanneroo boundary	Greenwood–Marangaroo boundary	9.2	5.7	Marangaroo Drive (State Route 81) – Marangaroo, Ballajura	State Route 81 northern concurrency terminus; Traffic light controlled intersection
Joondalup–Wanneroo boundary	Greenwood–Marangaroo–Kingsley–Madeley quadripoint	10.4	6.5	Hepburn Avenue (State Route 82) – Hillarys, Malaga	Traffic light controlled intersection
Joondalup–Wanneroo boundary	Kingsley–Madeley boundary	11.2	7.0	Woodlake Retreat west / Kingsway – Darch, Landsdale east	Traffic light controlled intersection
Joondalup–Wanneroo boundary	Kingsley–Madeley boundary	12.3	7.6	Gnangara Road (State Route 83) – Wangara, Ellenbrook	State Route 83 southern concurrency terminus; Traffic light controlled t-junction
Joondalup–Wanneroo boundary	Kingsley–Madeley–Woodvale–Wangara quadripoint	12.7	7.9	Whitfords Avenue (State Route 83) – Padbury, Craigie	State Route 83 northern concurrency terminus; Traffic light controlled intersection
Wanneroo	Woodvale–Wangara boundary	13.7	8.5	Prindiville Parade – Wangara	Traffic light controlled intersection
Wanneroo	Woodvale–Wangara–Wanneroo–Pearsall quadripoint	14.7	9.1	Ocean Reef Road (State Route 84) – Ocean Reef, Wangara, Ellenbrook	Parclo interchange
Wanneroo	Wanneroo	18.4	11.4	Hastings Street	Entrance to Wanneroo Central; Traffic light controlled intersection
Wanneroo	Wanneroo	18.5	11.5	Dundebar Road – Wanneroo	Traffic light controlled t-junction
Wanneroo	Wanneroo–Sinagra–Ashby tripoint	19.8	12.3	Pinjar Road – Ashby, Tapping, Banksia Grove	Traffic light controlled t-junction
Wanneroo	Wanneroo–Ashby boundary	20.3	12.6	Wallawa Street	Traffic light controlled t-junction
Wanneroo	Wanneroo–Tapping–Neerabup–Carramar quadripoint	22.9	14.2	Joondalup Drive (State Route 85) – Joondalup, Bullsbrook	Roundabout interchange
Wanneroo	Neerabup	26.4	16.4	Neerabup Road – Clarkson, Mindarie west / Flynn Drive – Neerabup, Banksia Grove	Traffic light controlled t-junction
Wanneroo	Neerabup–Nowergup boundary	29.5	18.3	Hester Avenue – Ridgewood, Merriwa, Quinns Rocks	Traffic light controlled t-junction
Wanneroo	Nowergup-Carabooda boundary	35.2	21.9	Romeo Road west / Karoborup Road east – Alkimos, Eglinton	Traffic light controlled t-junction
Wanneroo	Yanchep	43.6	27.1	Yanchep Beach Road – Yanchep, Two Rocks west / Indian Ocean Drive (State Route 60) – Guilderton, Lancelin, Jurien Bay north	Northern terminus of Wanneroo Road; Road continues north as Indian Ocean Drive
1.000 mi = 1.609 km; 1.000 km = 0.621 mi: Concurrency terminus

== Gallery ==
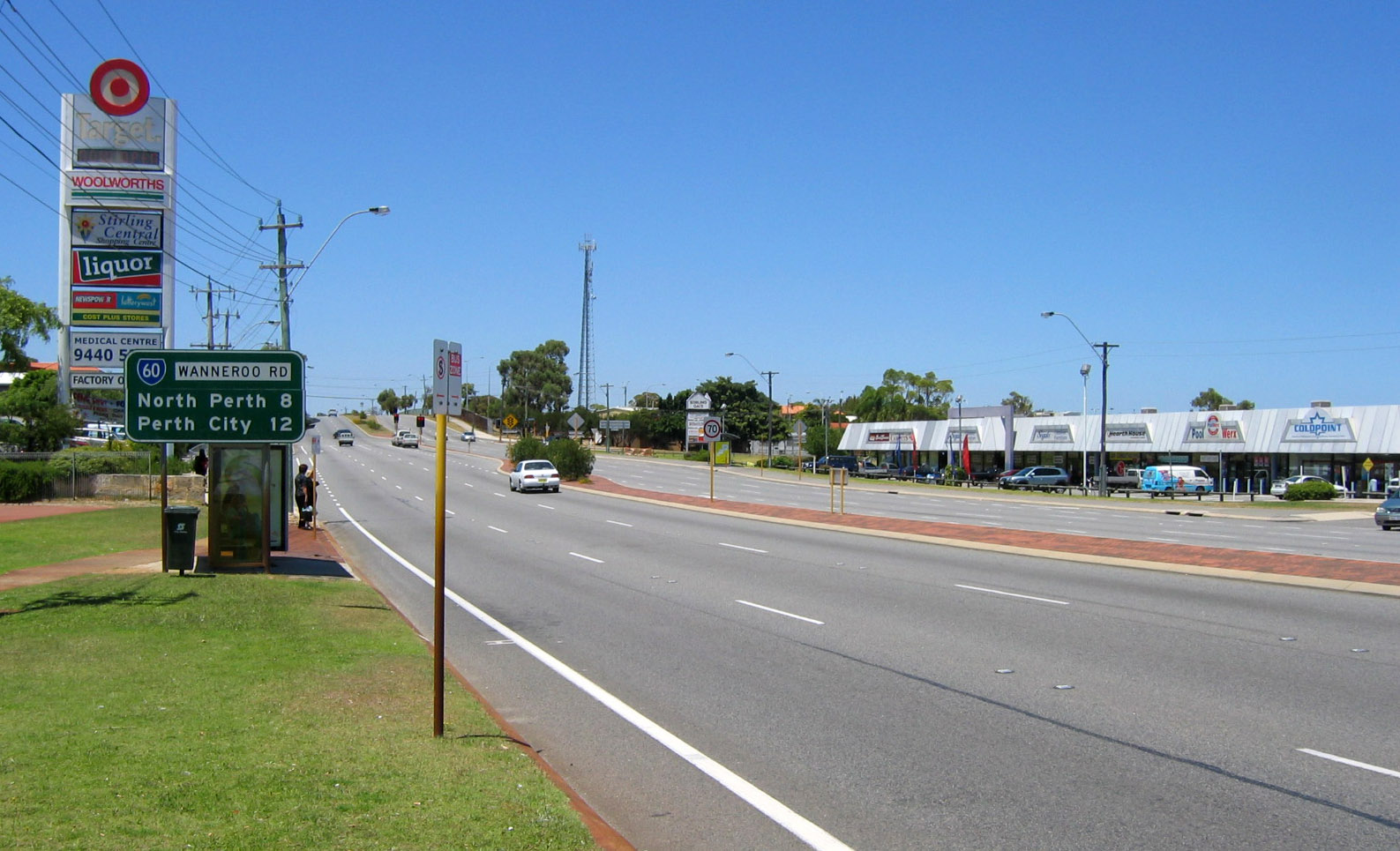
Looking south near Balcatta Road (9 km)

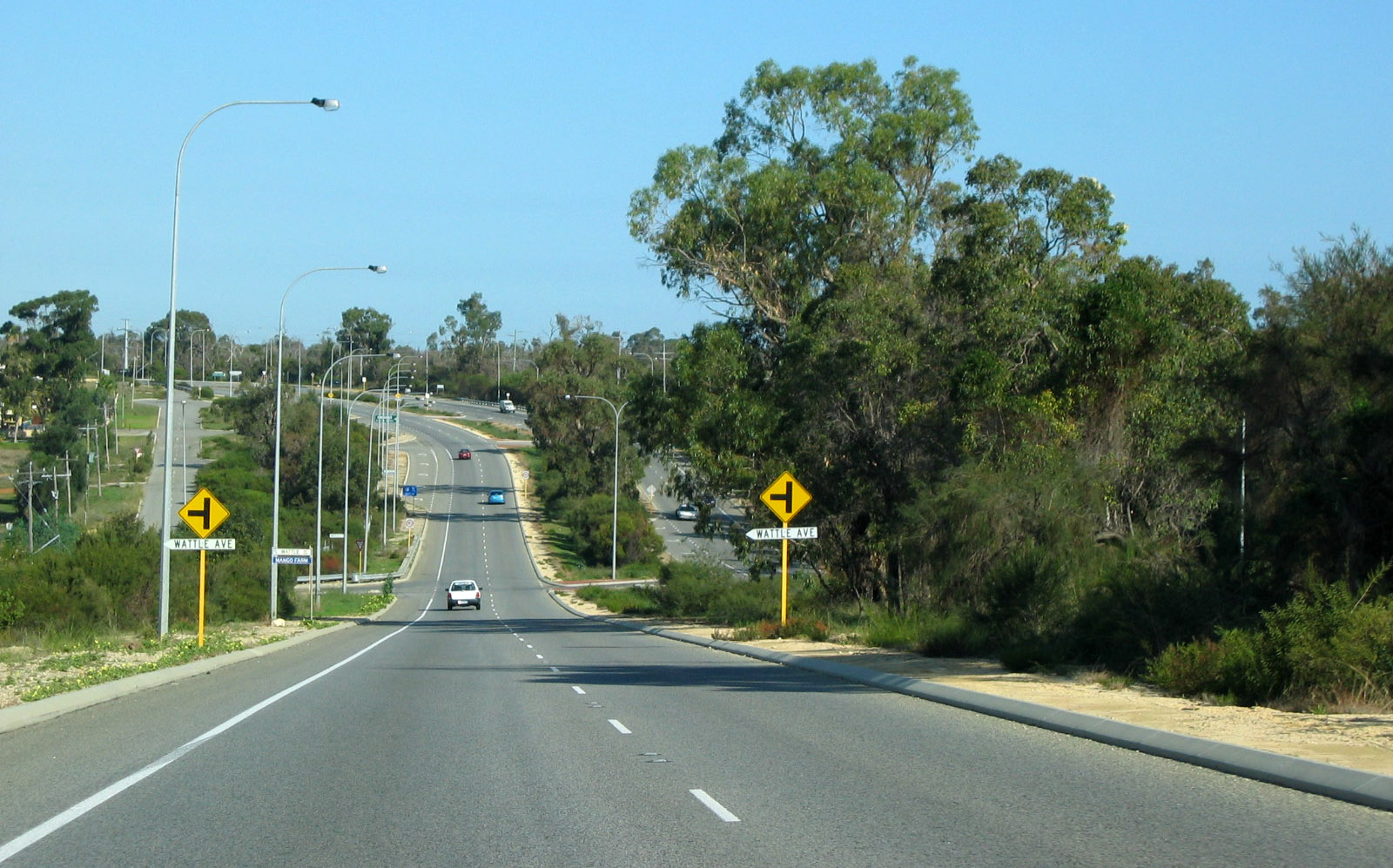
Looking south near Hester Avenue (34 km)

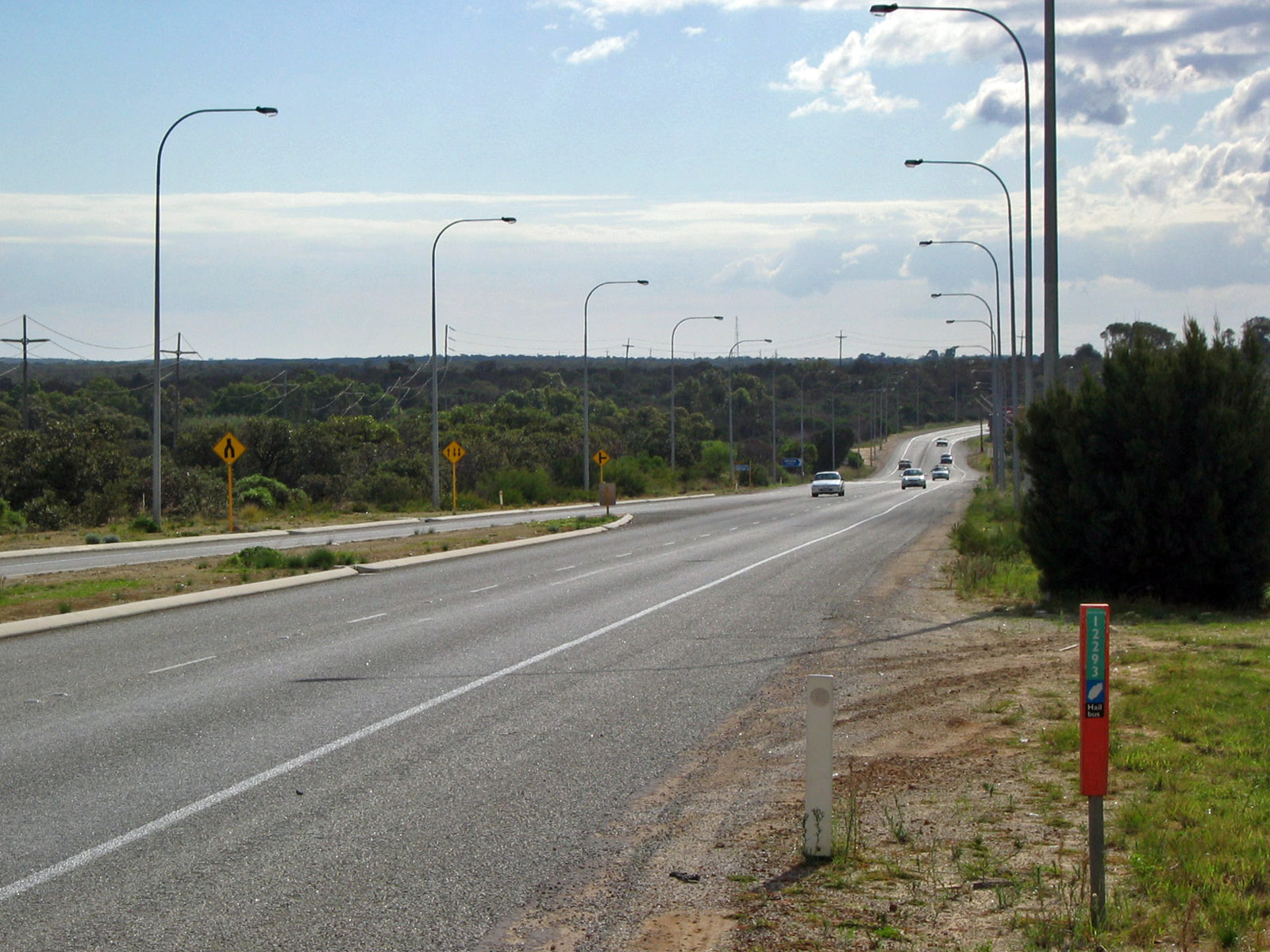
Looking north near One Tree Hill (36 km)

View southbound from Warwick Road

== See also ==
- Highways in Australia
- List of highways in Western Australia
