= City of Wanneroo =

Coordinates: 31°44′49″S 115°48′11″E

- Local government area
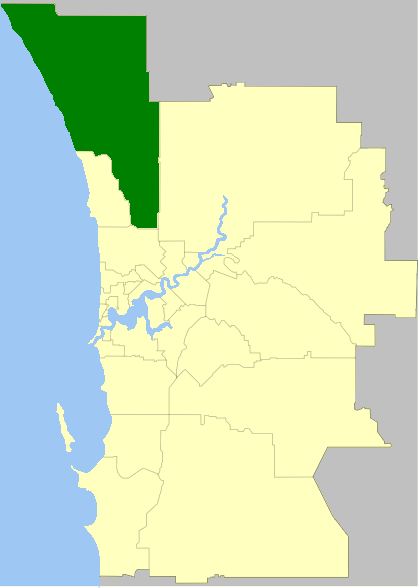
- The City of Wanneroo within the Perth Metropolitan Area

- Interactive map of City of Wanneroo
- Country: Australia
- State: Western Australia
- Region: North metropolitan Perth
- Established: 1902
- Council seat: Wanneroo

Government
  - Mayor: Linda Aitken
  - State electorate: Wanneroo, Burns Beach, Butler, Girrawheen, Mirrabooka, West Swan
  - Federal division: Cowan, Moore, Pearce

Area
  - Total: 685.8 km^{2} (264.8 sq mi)

Population
  - Total: 209,111 (LGA 2021) (27th)
- Website: City of Wanneroo
LGAs around City of Wanneroo
	Gingin	Chittering
Indian Ocean	City of Wanneroo	Swan
	Joondalup	Stirling

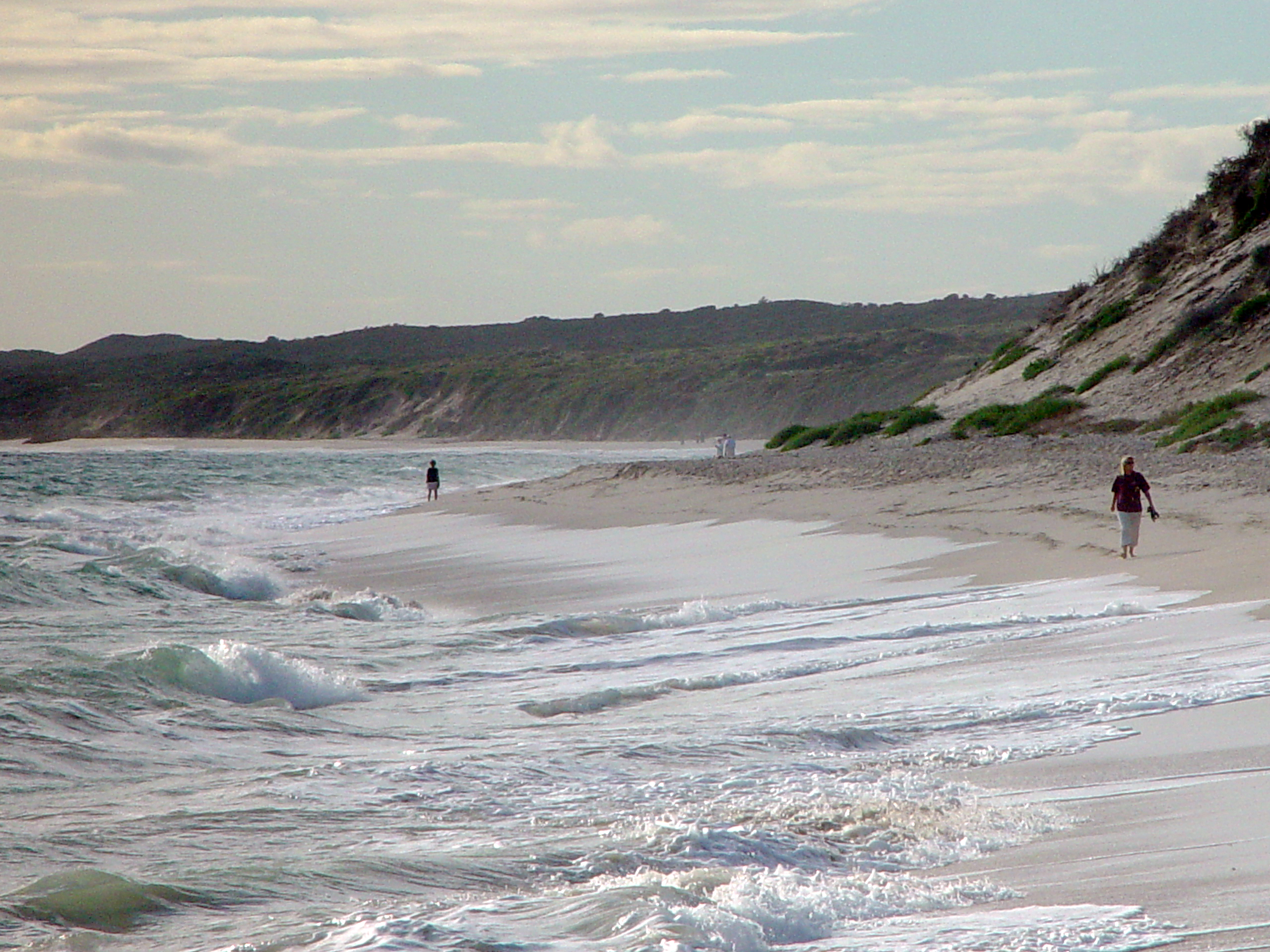
Beach at Wanneroo, 2005

The City of Wanneroo is a local government area with city status in the northern suburbs of Perth, Western Australia. It is centred approximately 25 kilometres (15.5 mi) north of Perth's central business district and forms part of the northern boundary of the Perth metropolitan area. Wanneroo encompasses the federal divisions of Cowan, Moore and Pearce.

The city's main commercial and residential town centres are located at Wanneroo in the east and Clarkson in the north. Further urban centres are planned at Alkimos, Yanchep and Two Rocks in the future to coincide with rapid metropolitan expansion and development in the area. It is also home to the Yanchep and Neerabup National Parks, as well as the Neerabup Industrial Estate in the north.

From the city's inception until 1 July 1998, it also incorporated the neighbouring City of Joondalup in its entirety.

== Geography ==
Wanneroo covers a land area totalling 685.8 square kilometres (264.8 sq mi). The city is bounded by Beach Road and the City of Stirling to the south, Alexander Drive and the City of Swan to the east, Wanneroo Road and Lake Joondalup to the south-west, the Indian Ocean to the west and the Shire of Gingin to the north.

Wanneroo's population is concentrated in three locations: at the southern end centred on Girrawheen; in the region surrounding Wanneroo near the city's geographical centre; and along the northern Perth coastline centred on Clarkson, separated from Joondalup by the rural localities of Neerabup and Tamala Park. Land in the city's north and east remains predominantly rural in character.

The City of Wanneroo encompasses one of Perth's busiest industrial areas, Wangara. It is situated roughly 20 km north of the central business district, and is the industrial hub of the north side of Perth. The suburb of Wangara is a hub for commercial manufacturing, vehicle dealerships, industrial glaziers and commercial distribution warehousing. It is also roughly 10 km from Joondalup, Perth's largest satellite city north of the Swan River.

== History ==
Prior to 1902, Wanneroo was part of the Perth Road District, which eventually went on to become the City of Stirling. The Wanneroo Road District was established on 31 October 1902 under the Roads Act 1888. The board was named after the Wanneroo wetlands in the area, first explored and recorded by John Butler in 1834.

With the passage of the Local Government Act 1960, all road boards became shires effective from 1 July 1961, and the Shire of Wanneroo came into being, encompassing everything north of Beach Road and west of Alexander Drive. With the development of and subsequent population growth surrounding Joondalup, the Shire of Wanneroo attained City status on 31 October 1985.

On 1 July 1998, on the recommendation of a report by the Local Government Advisory Committee, the City of Wanneroo was bifurcated. The southwestern section, encompassing the urban centre of Joondalup, was separately incorporated as the new City of Joondalup. The remainder, including the inland suburbs east of Lake Joondalup and the coastal suburbs north of Burns Beach, formed a reduced Shire of Wanneroo, which quickly regained City status on 1 July 1999. As this was before the local government elections to elect a mayor and councillors, the second incarnation of the Shire did not have a Shire President.

== Demographics ==
The City of Wanneroo has experienced significant population growth of almost 110,000 persons in the 15 years between the 2001 Census and 2016 Census. The city also has the second largest population of any local government area in greater Perth.

Selected historical census data for Wanneroo local government area						
Census year		2001	2006	2011	2016	2021
Population	Estimated residents on census night	80,008	110,940	152,077	188,212	209,111
Population	LGA rank in terms of size within Western Australia		3rd	3rd	▲2nd	2nd
Population	% of Western Australia population	4.37%	▲5.66%	▲6.79%	▲7.60%	
Population	% of Australian population	0.43%	▲0.56%	▲0.71%	▲0.80%	
Cultural and language diversity						
Ancestry, top responses	English			31.0%	▼29.5%	39.7%
Ancestry, top responses	Australian			21.5%	▼19.9%	26.3%
Ancestry, top responses	Scottish			6.2%	6.2%	8.5%
Ancestry, top responses	Irish			5.7%	▲6.2%	8.5%
Ancestry, top responses	Italian			3.6%	▼3.3%	4.6%
Language, top responses (other than English)	Vietnamese	3.8%	▼3.1%	▼2.7%	2.7%	2.6%
Language, top responses (other than English)	Italian	1.8%	▼1.4%	▼1.1%		
Language, top responses (other than English)	Macedonian	1.4%	▼1.2%	▼1.0%		
Language, top responses (other than English)	Arabic	0.6%	▲0.8%	▲1.0%	1.0%	1.0%
Language, top responses (other than English)	Polish	0.5%				
Language, top responses (other than English)	Spanish		0.5%			
Language, top responses (other than English)	Afrikaans			1.3%	▲1.6%	1.5%
Language, top responses (other than English)	Gujarati				0.9%	1.3%
Language, top responses (other than English)	Mandarin				0.9%	0.8%
Religious affiliation						
Religious affiliation, top responses	Catholic	25.3%	▼23.4%	▼23.3%	▼20.9%	18.1%
Religious affiliation, top responses	Anglican	21.3%	▼20.6%	▼19.6%	▼14.3%	10.1%
Religious affiliation, top responses	No religion	19.3%	▲21.7%	▲23.8%	▲31.8%	42.0%
Religious affiliation, top responses	Buddhism	3.5%	▼3.0%	3.0%		
Religious affiliation, top responses	Uniting	2.6%	2.6%			
Religious affiliation, top responses	Not Stated					5.5%
Religious affiliation, top responses	Christian, nfd					4.3%
Median weekly incomes						
Personal income	Median weekly personal income		A$491	A$662	A$724	A$817
Personal income	% of Australian median income		105.4%	114.7%	109.4%	
Family income	Median weekly family income		A$1184	A$1722	A$1910	A$2,148
Family income	% of Australian median income		101.1%	116.2%	110.2%	
Household income	Median weekly household income		A$1094	A$1415	A$1595	A$1,894
Household income	% of Australian median income		106.5%	114.7%	110.9%	

With less than 53% of the population having been born in Australia at the 2016 Census, Wanneroo has a large immigrant populace. Over 13% of Wanneroo's residents were born in the United Kingdom, compared to less than 4.0% nationwide. New Zealanders, Vietnamese and South Africans compose the city's most significant minority populations.

== Suburbs ==
The suburbs of the City of Wanneroo with population and size figures based on the most recent Australian census:

Suburb	Population	Area	Map
Alexander Heights	7,772 (SAL 2021)	3.2 km^{2} (1.2 sq mi)	
Alkimos	10,203 (SAL 2021)	13 km^{2} (5.0 sq mi)	
Ashby	2,850 (SAL 2021)	1.5 km^{2} (0.58 sq mi)	
Banksia Grove	11,351 (SAL 2021)	5.1 km^{2} (2.0 sq mi)	
Butler	13,473 (SAL 2021)	5.0 km^{2} (1.9 sq mi)	
Carabooda	444 (SAL 2021)	19.1 km^{2} (7.4 sq mi)	
Carramar	7,178 (SAL 2021)	6.7 km^{2} (2.6 sq mi)	
Clarkson	13,904 (SAL 2021)	6.6 km^{2} (2.5 sq mi)	
Darch	7,347 (SAL 2021)	3.21 km^{2} (1.24 sq mi)	
Eglinton	3,705 (SAL 2021)	15 km^{2} (5.8 sq mi)	
Girrawheen	8,897 (SAL 2021)	4.1 km^{2} (1.6 sq mi)	
Gnangara	1,347 (SAL 2021)	14.0 km^{2} (5.4 sq mi)	
Hocking	6,987 (SAL 2021)	2.4 km^{2} (0.93 sq mi)	
Jandabup	291 (SAL 2021)	18.1 km^{2} (7.0 sq mi)	
Jindalee	4,044 (SAL 2021)	3.6 km^{2} (1.4 sq mi)	
Koondoola	4,055 (SAL 2016)	3.5 km^{2} (1.4 sq mi)	
Landsdale	15,401 (SAL 2021)	8.5 km^{2} (3.3 sq mi)	
Madeley	6,805 (SAL 2021)	3.1 km^{2} (1.2 sq mi)	
Marangaroo	10,483 (SAL 2021)	4.8 km^{2} (1.9 sq mi)	
Mariginiup	876 (SAL 2021)	24.3 km^{2} (9.4 sq mi)	
Merriwa	5,587 (SAL 2021)	2.3 km^{2} (0.89 sq mi)	
Mindarie	7,867 (SAL 2021)	4.6 km^{2} (1.8 sq mi)	
Neerabup	112 (SAL 2021)	34 km^{2} (13 sq mi)	
Nowergup	189 (SAL 2021)	40 km^{2} (15 sq mi)	
Pearsall	4,244 (SAL 2021)	1.5 km^{2} (0.58 sq mi)	
Pinjar	74 (SAL 2021)	27.4 km^{2} (10.6 sq mi)	
Quinns Rocks	8,861 (SAL 2021)	4.3 km^{2} (1.7 sq mi)	
Ridgewood	4,623 (SAL 2021)	2 km^{2} (0.77 sq mi)	
Sinagra	3,100 (SAL 2021)	2.1 km^{2} (0.81 sq mi)	
Tamala Park	0 (SAL 2021)	4.2 km^{2} (1.6 sq mi)	
Tapping	9,547 (SAL 2021)	3.5 km^{2} (1.4 sq mi)	
Two Rocks	3,822 (SAL 2021)	52 km^{2} (20 sq mi)	
Wangara	43 (SAL 2021)	5.6 km^{2} (2.2 sq mi)	
Wanneroo	12,113 (SAL 2021)	2.4 km^{2} (0.93 sq mi)	
Woodvale	9,579 (SAL 2021)	7.4 km^{2} (2.9 sq mi)	
Yanchep	11,022 (SAL 2021)	221.4 km^{2} (85.5 sq mi)	

== Population ==
=== Pre-1998 composition ===
Historical population

Year	Pop.	±% p.a.
1911	197	—
1921	312	+4.71%
1933	694	+6.89%
1947	947	+2.25%
1954	1,299	+4.62%
1961	1,732	+4.20%
1966	2,437	+7.07%

Year	Pop.	±% p.a.
1971	8,620	+28.74%
1976	55,328	+45.04%
1981	93,611	+11.09%
1986	126,053	+6.13%
1991	167,176	+5.81%
1996	201,853	+3.84%

=== 1998-Present composition ===
Historical population
Year	Pop.	±% p.a.
1991	45,024	—
1996	61,660	+6.49%
2001	80,008	+5.35%
2006	110,940	+6.76%
2011	152,077	+6.51%
2016	188,212	+4.36%
2021	209,111	+2.13%

== Transport ==
The City of Wanneroo is served by two major north–south arterial roads, Wanneroo Road and Marmion Avenue. The two roads run parallel to each other through Wanneroo's eastern and western suburbs respectively. A third north–south arterial route, the Mitchell Freeway, extends north from Joondalup to terminate in the south of Alkimos.

The City of Wanneroo has five railway stations in Clarkson, Butler, Alkimos, Eglinton and Yanchep, which are all served by the Yanchep line.

== Governance ==
The Wanneroo City Council operates out of the Council Chambers on Dundebar Road, Wanneroo.

The current mayor is Linda Aitken, who was elected in September 2022.

Elections are held every four years, for a mayor and 14 councillors across the city's seven electoral wards, covering 36 suburbs. Two councillors are elected to each of the wards.

=== Local government wards ===
Ward	Councillors	Suburbs
North	Alex Figg; Sonet Coetzee	Alkimos, Carabooda, Eglinton, Jindalee, Two Rocks, Yanchep
North-East	Glynis Parker; Bronwyn Smith	Butler, Merriwa, Ridgewood, North Clarkson, Nowergup
Central-West	Helen Berry; Phil Bedworth	Quinns Rocks, Mindarie, Tamala Park, South Clarkson, Neerabup
Central-East	Marizane Moore; Paul Miles	Pinjar, Carramar, Banksia Grove, Tapping, Ashby, Mariginiup, Jandabup
Central	Jacqui Huntley; Jordan Wright	Wanneroo, Sinagra, Hocking, Pearsall, Gnangara
South-West	Natalie Herridge; Vinh Nguyen	East Woodvale, Wangara, Madeley, Darch, Landsdale, North-West Marangaroo
South	James Rowe (Deputy Mayor); Eman Seif	Marangaroo, Alexander Heights, Girrawheen, Koondoola

== Sister cities ==
Wanneroo has three sister cities. It was also formerly twinned with Sorrento in Italy, but this association was broken with the bifurcation of Wanneroo in 1998, when the Wanneroo suburb of Sorrento was incorporated into the City of Joondalup.

- Sinagra, Sicily, Italy
- Kastoria, Greece (1992)

== Heritage listed places ==
As of 2024, 149 places are heritage-listed in the City of Wanneroo, of which 34 are on the State Register of Heritage Places, a large number of those located in Yanchep National Park.
