= Wanneroo =

- Suburb
- Interactive map of Wanneroo
- Coordinates: 31.747°S 115.803°E
- Country: Australia
- State: Western Australia
- City: Perth
- LGA: City of Wanneroo
- Location: 25 km (16 mi) N of Perth CBD

Government
  - State electorate: Wanneroo
  - Federal division: Pearce

Area
  - Total: 2.4 km^{2} (0.93 sq mi)

Population
  - Total: 12,113 (SAL 2021)
- Postcode: 6065
Suburbs around Wanneroo
| Ashby | Sinagra | Jandabup |
| Lake Joondalup | Wanneroo | Gnangara |
| Woodvale | Hocking | Wangara |

Wanneroo is a northern suburb of Perth, Western Australia, located within the City of Wanneroo.

== Geography ==
As it is on the Swan Coastal Plain, the Wanneroo wetlands stretch parallel to the coastline and to the north and south of the suburb.

== Education ==
Within the suburb of Wanneroo, there are three primary schools: Wanneroo Primary School, East Wanneroo Primary School, and St Anthony's Catholic Primary School. Wanneroo also has one high school, Wanneroo Secondary College.

== Major events ==
Since 1909, the Wanneroo Agricultural Show, the state's largest regional agricultural show, is held annually within Wanneroo, typically during late November.

== Transport ==
Transperth bus route 389 runs from a terminus on Belgrade Road, Wanneroo, directly to Perth Busport along Wanneroo Road. Local services are the 467 and 468 bus routes that connect buses to trains and operate between Whitfords Station and Joondalup Station. Route 467 serves smaller streets and passes near the 389 terminus on Belgrade Road, as well as the Wanneroo Town Centre (where selected services terminate) and Wanneroo Secondary College. Route 468 is a much faster service, passing straight through Wanneroo along Wanneroo Road. All three of these bus services deviate to the Wanneroo Secondary College at school start and end hours. There are no bus services serving the housing areas to the west side of Wanneroo Road. In the northern part of the suburb near the Wanneroo Botanical Gardens, routes 390 and 391 also operate, with a transfer stop located on Joondalup Drive near the intersection of Joondalup Drive and Wanneroo Road, which contains an overpass.

=== Bus ===
- 389 Wanneroo to Perth Busport – serves Belgrade Road, Steven Street, Dundebar Road, Elizabeth Road and Wanneroo Road
- 390 Joondalup Station to Banksia Grove – serves Joondalup Drive and Wanneroo Road
- 391 Joondalup Station to Banksia Grove – serves Joondalup Drive
- 467 Joondalup Station to Whitfords Station – serves Joondalup Drive, Waldburg Drive, Wanneroo Road, Dundebar Road, Elizabeth Road, Belgrade Road, Scott Road, High Road, Quarkum Street and Elliot Road
- 468 Joondalup Station to Whitfords Station – serves Joondalup Drive and Wanneroo Road

== See also ==
- 2023 Wanneroo bushfire
