= Grand Boulevard, Joondalup =

Road in Perth, Western Australia

Grand Boulevard Western Australia
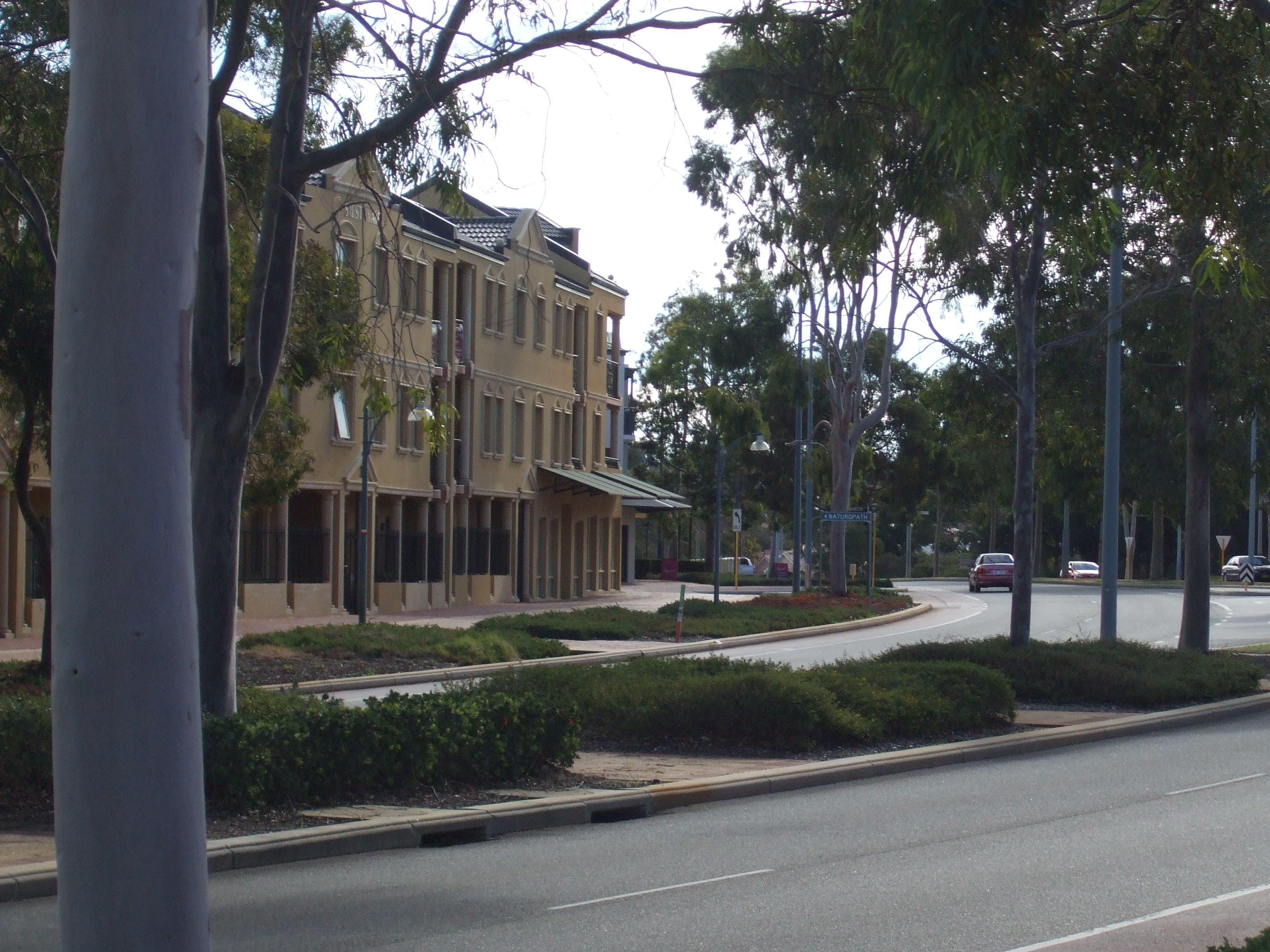
- View north-west near Hammersmith Court

General information
- Type: Street
- Length: 2.3 km (1.4 mi)
- Opened: 1989

Major junctions
- North end: Moore Drive
- Shenton Avenue; Boas Avenue; Collier Pass
- South end: Hodges Drive

Location(s)
- Suburb(s): Joondalup CBD

Grand Boulevard is the main street of Joondalup, a regional centre 26 kilometres (16 mi) north of Perth, Western Australia. It was originally built in 1989 as the main axis road for the new Joondalup central business district.

== History ==
In 2005, a section of the road between Boas Avenue and Shenton Avenue was reduced from dual carriageway to an undivided road, primarily to provide additional at-grade on-street parking bays, but also to assist in the reduction of traffic flow and speeds through the central area.

== Facilities ==
View north of Collier Pass

View south of Shenton Avenue

Facilities served by Grand Boulevard include, from south to north, the Joondalup campus of Edith Cowan University, the main campus of West Coast Institute of Training, Joondalup railway station, Lakeside Joondalup, the Joondalup Magistrates' Court and the regional office and station for the Western Australia Police, and Joondalup Health Campus. A short stretch of the street between Boas Avenue and Shenton Avenue serves as a main shopping street for Joondalup.

As the CBD area has developed around the road, a significant number of high density multi-storey housing developments have been constructed since 2002, with the first of these being the Kingsbury Apartments situated at the intersection of Grand Boulevard and Queensbury Road. Since then, a further nine housing complexes have opened and at least two more are currently under construction. Generally these complexes are between three and five stories and must comply with local council planning guidelines relating to design standards for buildings fronting Grand Boulevard.

== Major intersections ==
Grand Boulevard commences at the intersection of Joondalup Drive and Hodges Drive, and continues from the latter. The entire road's length is in the City of Joondalup and the major intersections are controlled by traffic lights.

Location	km	mi	Destinations	Notes
Joondalup	0.0	0.0	Joondalup Drive (State Route 85) – Heathridge, Edgewater, Perth	Southwestern terminus. Continues as Hodges Drive westbound
Joondalup	0.4	0.25	Willcock Way west / Kendrew Crescent east	Access to Edith Cowan University and North Metropolitan TAFE campuses
Joondalup	0.75	0.47	Collier Pass	Access to Lakeside Joondalup and Joondalup railway station
Joondalup	1.1	0.68	Boas Avenue	Access to Lakeside Joondalup
Joondalup	1.4	0.87	Shenton Avenue – Iluka, Ocean Reef, Connolly	Access to Mitchell Freeway and Joondalup Health Campus
Joondalup	2.3	1.4	Joondalup Drive (State Route 85) – Currambine, Bullsbrook, Carramar, Tapping	Northwestern terminus. Continues as Moore Drive westbound
1.000 mi = 1.609 km; 1.000 km = 0.621 mi
