= Shenton Avenue =

Road in Perth, Western Australia

Coordinates: 31°44′32″S 115°44′50″E

Shenton Avenue Western Australia
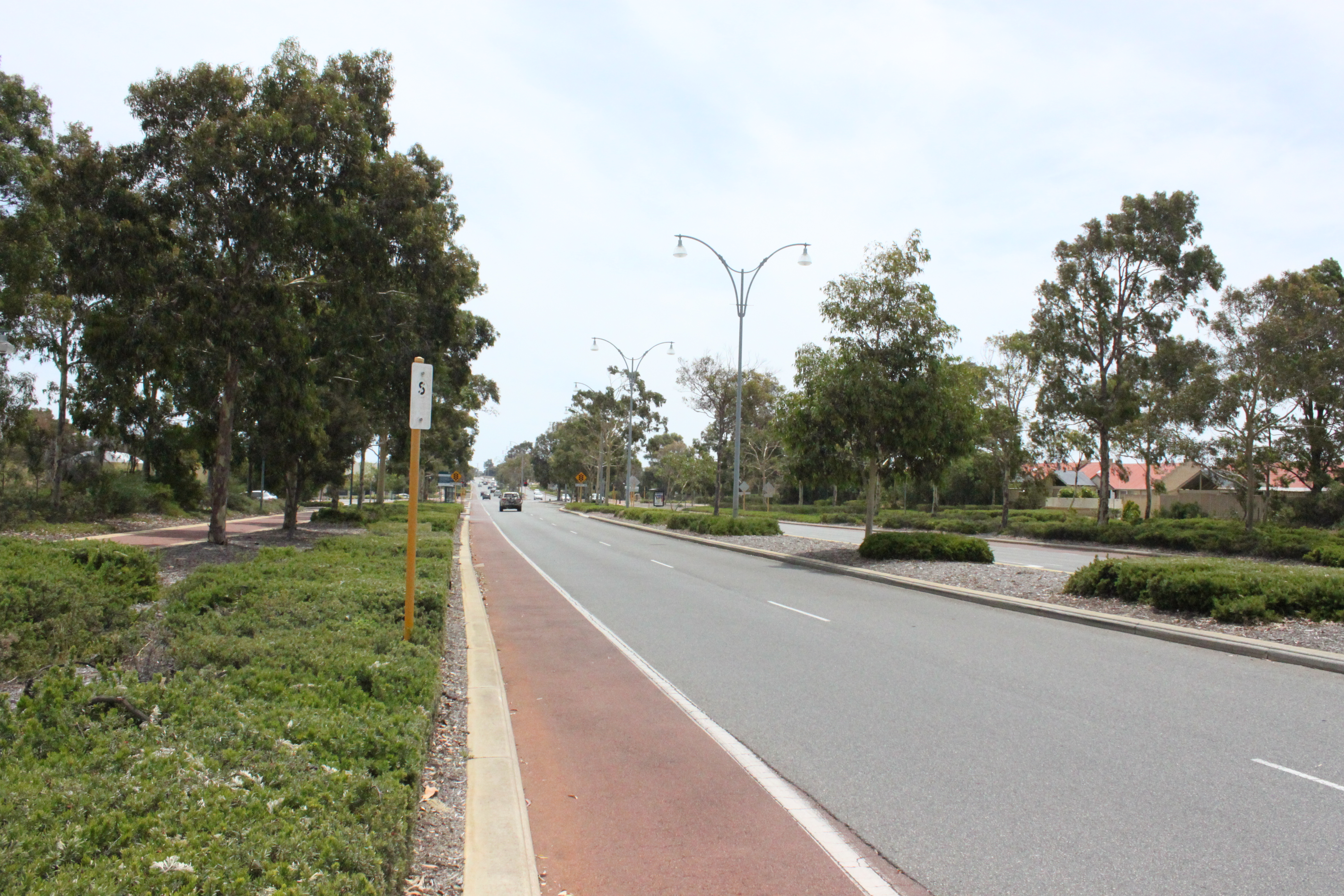
- View west from Grand Boulevard

General information
- Type: Road
- Length: 5 km (3.1 mi)

Major junctions
- East end: Lakeside Drive
- Grand Boulevard; Joondalup Drive (State Route 85); Mitchell Freeway (State Route 2); Connolly Drive; Marmion Avenue (State Route 71); Naturalise Boulevard; Delgado Parade
- West end: Ocean Reef Road; Burns Beach Road, Ocean Reef and Iluka

Location(s)
- Major suburbs: Connolly, Currambine

Shenton Avenue is an east–west distributor road in the northern suburbs of Perth, Western Australia, located within the City of Joondalup. The road primarily links Joondalup's coastal suburbs with the Joondalup central business district, through which it passes. It is also an entrance to the Mitchell Freeway.

A portion of Shenton Avenue passes through the main centre of the city of Joondalup, providing quick access to Lakeside Joondalup and Joondalup Health Campus. Outside the city centre, Shenton Avenue provides direct access to Currambine Marketplace and Lake Joondalup Baptist College.

== History ==
Shenton Avenue is a dual carriageway for most of its length, changing to two lanes west of Marmion Avenue. A number of major intersections cross the road, most of which are controlled by traffic lights or roundabouts. The most significant intersection is a large two-lane roundabout crossing with Marmion Avenue. The roundabout was constructed shortly after Currambine Marketplace was opened in 1997. New traffic lights were constructed between Shenton Avenue and Grand Boulevard in the late 1990s. More new traffic lights were developed around the mid-2000s, where Shenton Avenue crosses with Pontiac Way and McLarty Avenue.

The road acts as a border between the suburbs of Iluka and Currambine to the north and Ocean Reef and Connolly to the south.

== Major intersections ==
View westbound from Grand Boulevard

The entire road's length is within the City of Joondalup.

Location	km	mi	Destinations	Notes
Iluka–Ocean Reef boundary	0	0.0	Burns Beach Road (State Route 87) northbound / Ocean Reef Road (State Route 84) southbound – Burns Beach, Mullaloo, Wangara, Ellenbrook	Western terminus at roundabout.
Iluka–Ocean Reef boundary	0.5	0.31	Constellation Drive	Roundabout.
Iluka–Ocean Reef boundary	0.8	0.50	Naturaliste Boulevard	Roundabout.
Ocean Reef–Iluka–Currambine–Connolly quadripoint	1.2	0.75	Marmion Avenue (State Route 71) – Yanchep, Clarkson, Hillarys, Scarborough	Roundabout
Connolly–Currambine boundary	2.0	1.2	Connolly Drive – Kinross, Clarkson, Butler	Traffic light controlled T-junction.
Joondalup-Connolly–Currambine tripoint	2.9– 3.1	1.8– 1.9	Mitchell Freeway (State Route 2) – Butler, Stirling, Perth	Signalised diamond interchange. Mitchell Freeway free-flowing.
Joondalup	3.4	2.1	Pontiac Way	Signalised intersection
Joondalup	3.7	2.3	Joondalup Drive (State Route 85) – Edgewater, Carramar, Tapping, Bullsbrook	Signalised intersection
Joondalup	4.0	2.5	McLarty Avenue	Signalised intersection. Access to Lakeside Joondalup shopping centre.
Joondalup	4.3	2.7	Grand Boulevard	Signalised intersection.
Joondalup	4.5	2.8	Davidson Terrace - Joondalup Health Campus	Roundabout
Joondalup	4.7	2.9	Lakeside Drive	Eastern terminus at unsignalised t-junction
1.000 mi = 1.609 km; 1.000 km = 0.621 mi Note: Intersections with minor local roads are not shown
