= Ocean Parade =

Ocean Parade may refer to:

- Ocean Parade (Dreamworld), a themed area in the Dreamworld amusement park in Gold Coast, Australia
- Ocean Parade, Western Australia, a village between Burns Beach, Western Australia and Iluka, Western Australia on Burns Beach Road
- Ocean Parade, part of Boat Harbour, New South Wales
