= Electoral district of Ocean Reef =

Former electoral district of Western Australia

Ocean Reef Western Australia—Legislative Assembly
- State: Western Australia
- Dates current: 2008–2017
- Namesake: Ocean Reef
- Area: 22 km^{2} (8.5 sq mi)

Ocean Reef was an electoral district of the Legislative Assembly of Western Australia. It was located in Perth's northern suburbs, and was named after the suburb of Ocean Reef.

== History ==
Ocean Reef was created at the 2007 redistribution out of most of the Mindarie electorate and parts of Joondalup and Hillarys. Its creation reflected both the growth of the City of Wanneroo region which now required three full electorates (Wanneroo, Mindarie and Girrawheen), and the increase in the number of metropolitan seats in accordance with the new one vote one value legislation.

Ocean Reef was a notional Labor seat upon its creation, but was one of a number of marginal seats that fell to the Liberal Party at the 2008 election. Liberal candidate Albert Jacob won it on a swing of six percent. He picked up a massive 16-point swing in 2013 amid the Liberals' landslide re-election victory. Ocean Reef was abolished in a 2015 redistribution, with effect from the 2017 state election. Its territory was distributed between Burns Beach (a new seat) and Joondalup.

== Geography ==
Ocean Reef extended from the Wanneroo-Joondalup coastal boundary southwards, taking in the suburbs of Burns Beach, Iluka, Kallaroo, Kinross, Mullaloo, Ocean Reef and most of Currambine.

In the redistribution of 2011, the suburb of Mindarie was moved from the district of Mindarie into the district of Ocean Reef, effective at the 2013 election. The district of Mindarie was renamed Butler as a result.

== Members for Ocean Reef ==
Member	Party	Term
Albert Jacob	Liberal	2008–2017

== Election results ==
2013 Western Australian state election: Ocean Reef
Party	Candidate	Votes	%	±%
Liberal	Albert Jacob	13,700	65.1	+18.8
Labor	Philippa Taylor	5,384	25.6	–13.1
Greens	Mary O'Byrne	1,409	6.7	–3.5
Christians	Lyn Kennedy	301	1.4	–0.6
Family First	Aliné Croll	243	1.2	–1.7
Total formal votes		21,037	93.6	−1.3
Informal votes		1,430	6.4	+1.3
Turnout		22,467	90.1	
Two-party-preferred result
Liberal	Albert Jacob	14,507	69.0	+16.3
Labor	Philippa Taylor	6,527	31.0	–16.3
Liberal hold		Swing	+16.3	
