= Electoral results for the district of Ocean Reef =

Western Australian district election results

This is a list of electoral results for the electoral district of Ocean Reef in Western Australian state elections.

== Members for Ocean Reef ==
Member	Party	Term
Albert Jacob	Liberal	2008–2017

== Election results ==
=== Elections in the 2010s ===
2013 Western Australian state election: Ocean Reef
Party	Candidate	Votes	%	±%
Liberal	Albert Jacob	13,700	65.1	+18.8
Labor	Philippa Taylor	5,384	25.6	–13.1
Greens	Mary O'Byrne	1,409	6.7	–3.5
Christians	Lyn Kennedy	301	1.4	–0.6
Family First	Aliné Croll	243	1.2	–1.7
Total formal votes		21,037	93.6	−1.3
Informal votes		1,430	6.4	+1.3
Turnout		22,467	90.1	
Two-party-preferred result
Liberal	Albert Jacob	14,507	69.0	+16.3
Labor	Philippa Taylor	6,527	31.0	–16.3
Liberal hold		Swing	+16.3	

=== Elections in the 2000s ===
2008 Western Australian state election: Ocean Reef
Party	Candidate	Votes	%	±%
Liberal	Albert Jacob	9,163	47.7	+5.8
Labor	Louise Durack	7,056	36.7	−7.9
Greens	Justin Wood	2,001	10.4	+3.7
Family First	Frederick Hay	543	2.8	−0.6
Christian Democrats	Kevin Mullen	438	2.3	+0.2
Total formal votes		19,201	95.0	−0.2
Informal votes		1,020	5.0	+0.2
Turnout		20,221	87.7	
Two-party-preferred result
Liberal	Albert Jacob	10,445	54.4	+6.0
Labor	Louise Durack	8,747	45.6	−6.0
Liberal gain from Labor		Swing	+6.0	
