= Marmion Avenue =

Road in Perth, Western Australia

Marmion Avenue Western Australia
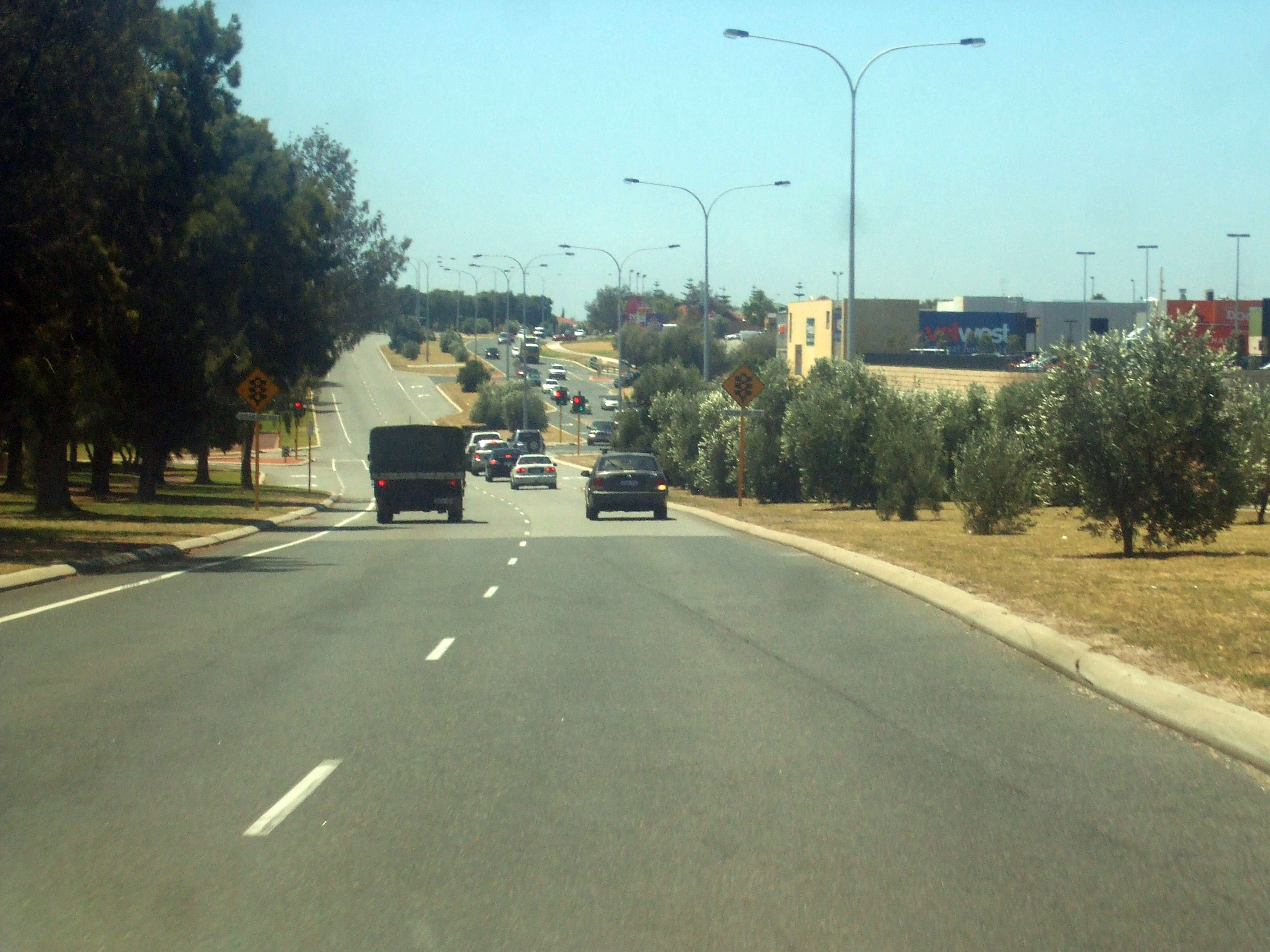

General information
- Type: Highway
- Length: 43 km (27 mi)
- Opened: 1960s
- Route number(s): State Route 71 (Trigg – Yanchep)

Major junctions
- South end: West Coast Highway (State Route 71 / Tourist Drive 204), Trigg
- Karrinyup Road (State Route 76 / Tourist Drive 204); Reid Highway (State Route 3); Warwick Road (State Route 81); Hepburn Avenue (State Route 82); Whitfords Avenue (State Route 83); Ocean Reef Road (State Route 84); Burns Beach Road (State Route 87); Yanchep Beach Road
- North end: Toreopango Avenue, Yanchep

Location(s)
- Major suburbs: Karrinyup, Hillarys, Clarkson, Butler, Alkimos, Yanchep

Highway system
- Highways in Australia; National Highway • Freeways in Australia; Highways in Western Australia

Marmion Avenue is a 40-kilometre (25 mi) arterial road in the northern coastal suburbs of Perth, Western Australia, linking Trigg in the south with Yanchep in the north. It forms part of State Route 71 along with West Coast Highway, which it joins onto at its southern terminus.

== Route description ==
View south from Burns Beach Road

Marmion Avenue is part of State Route 71, from the southern terminus to Yanchep Beach Road, continuing on from West Coast Highway. It commences in Trigg, travelling generally parallel with the Indian Ocean coastline, and the other north-south arterials Mitchell Freeway and Wanneroo Road, through mostly residential areas and some undeveloped land north of Currambine, and terminates in Yanchep. Marmion Avenue is managed by Main Roads Western Australia after previously being managed by the City of Joondalup from Ocean Reef Road to the City of Joondalup-Wanneroo boundary, and the City of Wanneroo for the rest of the road.

Marmion Avenue is a four-lane dual carriageway for its entire length. The speed limit is mostly 70 km/h (43 mph), with brief 80 km/h (50 mph) sections in the Tamala Park section plus the Alkimos to Yanchep section, and a 60 km/h (37 mph) section near the northern terminus in Yanchep.

The speed limit for most of Marmion Avenue was previously 80 km/h but was updated in February 2023 with new policies stating the maximum speed through traffic signals is 70 km/h.

=== Trigg to Currambine ===
Marmion Avenue starts as a four-lane dual carriageway as a continuation of West Coast Highway, at the traffic light controlled intersection with Karrinyup Road in the City of Stirling. From there, Marmion Avenue travels north for 1.8 kilometres (1.1 mi), past the Hamersley Public Golf Course and the residential areas of Trigg, North Beach and Karrinyup, before intersecting with the western terminus of Reid Highway and the western section of North Beach Road. Then, Marmion Avenue travels for 1.5 kilometres (0.93 mi) past the Star Swamp Reserve to the west and the residential area of Carine to the west, before intersecting with Beach Road, and crossing over into the City of Joondalup.

Marmion Avenue then travels north through residential suburbs for 6.6 kilometres (4.1 mi), having traffic light controlled intersections with Warwick Road and Hepburn Avenue, before passing Westfield Whitford City shopping centre, near Whitfords Avenue. Marmion Avenue continues north through residential areas, intersecting with Ocean Reef Road, Hodges Drive, Shenton Avenue and Moore Drive, and passing by Currambine Central Shopping Centre, before intersecting with Burns Beach Road.

=== North of Currambine ===
North of Burns Beach Road, Marmion Avenue passes through 1.9 kilometres (1.2 mi) of residential areas, before crossing into the City of Wanneroo and travelling through 1.6 kilometres (0.99 mi) of undeveloped land in Tamala Park. Marmion Avenue provides access to the Tamala Park Rubbish Disposal Site. Marmion Avenue then travels through the Clarkson – Butler region for 9.6 kilometres (6.0 mi), intersecting with Neerabup Road, Hester Avenue and Lukin Drive; the former two intersections also connect with discontinuous sections of Anchorage Drive — “south” and “north”, respectively.

Marmion Avenue then travels northwards through the recently developed suburbs of Alkimos and Eglinton, providing access to current and future developments. After 8 kilometres (5 mi), Marmion Avenue reaches the outer suburb of Yanchep at a large roundabout with Yanchep Beach Road. North of the roundabout, Splendid Avenue branches off eastward to a local sporting ground while Marmion Avenue, now a two-lane road, provides both access to newer residential development in the suburb and to Yanchep railway station via a roundabout with Botanic Boulevard. As of 2024, the road currently terminates at a T-junction with Toreopango Avenue.

== History ==
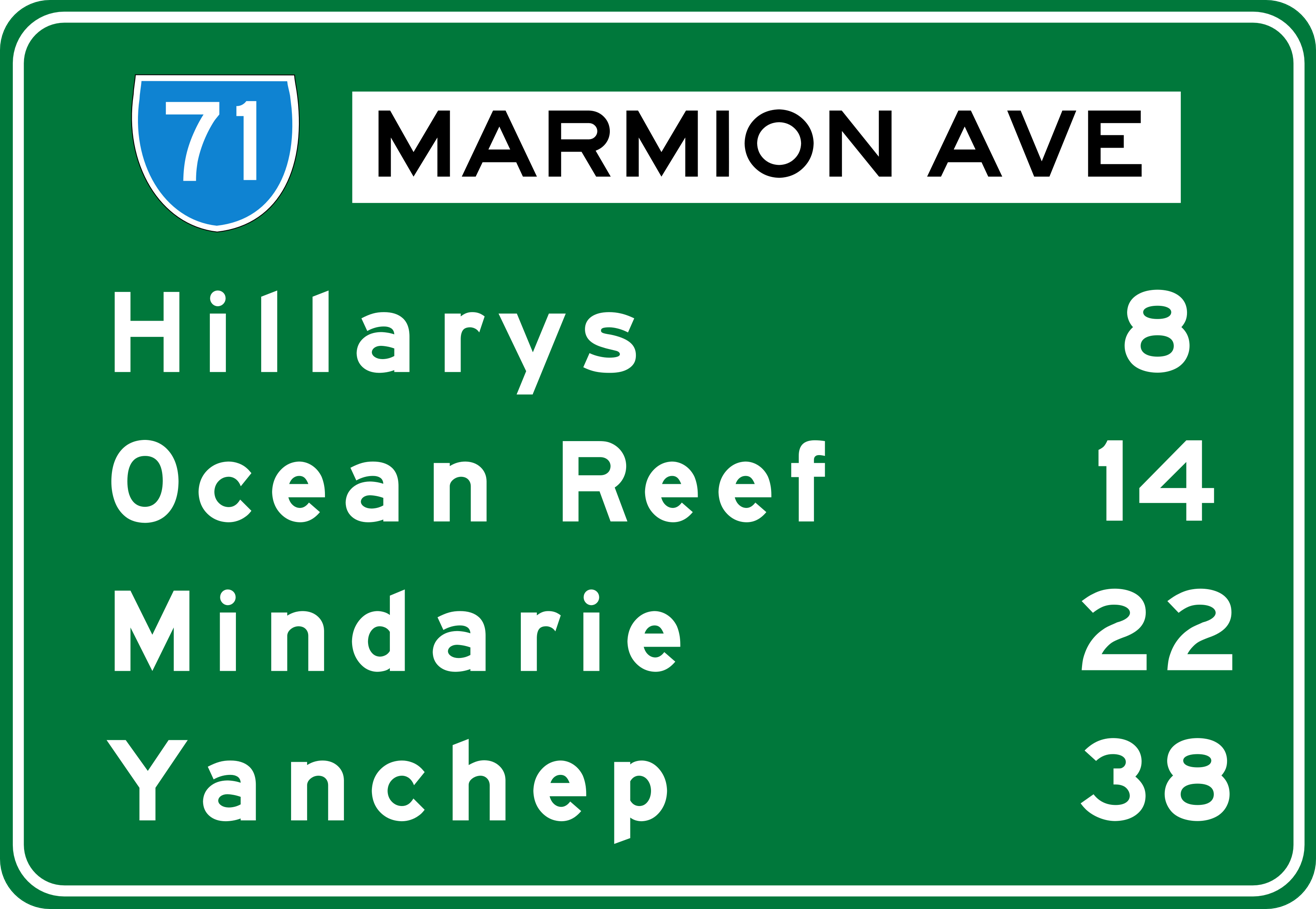
Approximate road distances (in kilometres) of coastal suburbs from Trigg onwards.

Marmion Avenue was first built as an arterial road that tracked the then-new outer northern suburbs of Perth, following the limit of the Perth metropolitan area as it expanded northwards. In the late 1960s, the road originally began at Beach Road in Marmion, giving the road its namesake.

Until the early 1980s, the road was a two-lane single carriageway connecting the coastal suburbs of Marmion and Mullaloo Beach. In 1984–85, the road was extended southwards to Karrinyup Road where it joined seamlessly onto West Coast Highway, which had been realigned further inland around the same time. Now the most important road in Perth's coastal suburbs, Marmion Avenue was duplicated up to Whitfords Avenue. In early 1986, it was assigned State Route 71, and from then on was gradually extended as a single carriageway road further north – extending first to Prendiville Avenue (just north of Ocean Reef Road), to Burns Beach Road in 1991 and to Quinns Road in the mid-1990s. Marmion Avenue was finally duplicated to its terminus in 2001, with the last portion being the empty stretch between Burns Beach Road & Quinns Rocks.

In 2000 and 2001, Reid Highway was extended as a two lane road from its terminus at Mitchell Freeway to Marmion Avenue, providing another link to the east. This section was later upgraded to a four-lane dual carriageway in 2015–2016.

After delays due to disagreements at State Government level about what route the road should follow, Marmion Avenue was extended further north to Yanchep and opened to traffic in November 2008. The extension opened as a single carriageway, but earthworks have already been undertaken to enable conversion to dual carriageway at a later date, which eventuated starting from 2018. The extension also features roundabouts at future major junctions. The completion of this extension allowed the future satellite city of Alkimos/Eglinton to begin construction.

On 1 July 2010, fixed red light and speed cameras were installed at the Marmion Avenue / Hepburn Avenue intersection to fine people who run red lights and speed, so the number of road deaths in Western Australia can be reduced.

In 2016, the existing Marmion Avenue / Mullaloo Drive intersection was upgraded from a non-signalised t-junction to a roundabout in response to a ranking as the 39th Worst Intersection. Pedestrian paths were re-aligned, off-road cycling paths were added, Western Power light poles were upgraded and crash barriers were installed to protect residents and pedestrians.

As part of Main Roads Western Australia's Traffic Congestion Management Program, Marmion Avenue's intersections with Hepburn Avenue and Whitfords Avenue were upgraded during 2016 and 2017 to improve traffic flow and safety. Between 2010 and 2015, there were 249 crashes at both of these intersections combined, and 72,000 vehicle use both these intersections per day. This project was funded by the state government, and cost $12 million. Longer and additional turning lanes were added, pedestrian and cycling facilities were upgraded, traffic signals were upgraded and power lines were put underground. CCTV was also installed so that Main Roads can monitor traffic flow. Construction started in November 2016 and finished ahead of schedule in May 2017.

During 2017, works were undertaken to widen Marmion Avenue to a four-lane dual carriageway between Lukin Drive and Butler Boulevard. The project cost $2.21 million and was funded by the City of Wanneroo. Construction started in February 2017 and was complete by August.

Construction started in 2018 on upgrading Marmion Avenue north of Camborne Parkway, from the current 2-lane single carriageway to a 4-lane dual carriageway. The state government has allocated the City of Wanneroo $23 million to upgrade the road. It is being done in three stages, with the first stage up to Alkimos already completed. The project was completed in July 2020.

== Future ==
Extensions of Marmion Avenue are possible to Two Rocks. Currently, works are being conducted to extend Marmion Avenue to Toreopango Avenue in Yanchep with new local road connections "Marmion Ave Extension, Yanchep". Perth's Transport at 3.5 million plan does not say that Marmion Avenue when the remaining extension to Two Rocks will occur, One possible complication would be Two Rocks's past use as a munitions dump, meaning that most non-suburban sections of the suburb are fenced off.

The ultimate plan is for Marmion Avenue to become a six-lane dual carriageway between Alkimos and Yanchep, and a four-lane dual carriageway for the rest of the road. Also, the intersection with Yanchep Beach Road may be grade separated by 2050. However, these plans have since been placed on perminate hold, with changes to Perth's future transport plan ongoing. Perth and Peel @ 3.5 million plan has since altered these plans, favouring an extension of Mitchell Freeway to Two Rocks and a new Whiteman Yanchep Highway to be built from Tonkin Highway via East Wanneroo to join with the Mitchell Freeway.

== Junction List ==
LGA	Location	km	mi	Destinations	Notes
Stirling	Trigg–Karrinyup boundary	0.0	0.0	West Coast Highway (State Route 71) – Cottesloe south / Karrinyup Road (State Route 76) – Karrinyup, Morley east and west	Marmion Avenue terminus; Road continues south as West Coast Highway; Traffic light controlled intersection
Stirling	North Beach–Watermans Bay–Carine–Karrinyup quadripoint	1.8	1.1	Reid Highway (State Route 3) – Balcatta, Morley, Perth Airport East / North Beach Road – North Beach west	Traffic light controlled intersection
Stirling–Joondalup boundary	Marmion–Duncraig–Carine tripoint	3.4	2.1	Beach Road	Traffic light controlled t-junction
Joondalup	Marmion–Sorrento–Duncraig tripoint	4.6	2.9	Warwick Road (State Route 81) – Warwick	Traffic light controlled t-junction
Joondalup	Sorrento–Hillarys–Padbury–Duncraig quadripoint	6.7	4.2	Hepburn Avenue (State Route 82) – Hillarys, Padbury, Ballajura	Traffic light controlled intersection; fixed red light and speed cameras installed
Joondalup	Hillarys–Kallaroo–Craigie–Padbury quadripoint	9.2	5.7	Whitfords Avenue (State Route 83) – Hillarys, Padbury, Wangara	Traffic light controlled intersection
Joondalup	Mullaloo–Beldon boundary	11.0	6.8	Mullaloo Drive – Mullaloo	Roundabout
Joondalup	Mullaloo–Ocean Reef–Heathridge–Beldon quadripoint	12.1	7.5	Ocean Reef Road (State Route 84) – Edgewater, Ocean Reef, Wangara	Traffic light controlled intersection
Joondalup	Ocean Reef–Connolly–Heathridge	14.1	8.8	Hodges Drive – Heathridge, Joondalup	Traffic light controlled intersection
Joondalup	Ocean Reef–Iluka–Currambine–Connolly quadripoint	15.5	9.6	Shenton Avenue – Connolly, Joondalup	Roundabout
Joondalup	Iluka–Currambine boundary	16.6	10.3	Moore Drive – Currambine, Joondalup	T-junction
Joondalup	Iluka–Burns Beach–Kinross–Currambine quadripoint	17.4	10.8	Burns Beach Road (State Route 87) – Burns Beach, Kinross, Joondalup	Traffic light controlled intersection
Wanneroo	Mindarie–Clarkson tripoint	21.5	13.4	Anchorage Drive west / Neerabup Road east – Mindarie, Clarkson	Roundabout
Wanneroo	Mindarie–Merriwa–Clarkson tripoint	23.6	14.7	Anchorage Drive North west / Hester Avenue east – Mindarie, Merriwa, Ridgewood, Clarkson	Roundabout
Wanneroo	Quinns Rocks–Butler–Merriwa tripoint	25.9	16.1	Lukin Drive – Butler, Ridgewood, Merriwa	Roundabout
Wanneroo	Jindalee–Butler boundary	27.0	16.8	Jindalee Boulevard west / Kingsbridge Boulevard east – Jindalee, Butler	Traffic light controlled intersection
Wanneroo	Jindalee–Butler boundary	28.2	17.5	Oceania Avenue west / Butler Boulevard east – Jindalee, Butler	Traffic light controlled intersection. Access to Butler railway station
Wanneroo	Jindalee–Butler boundary	28.8	17.9	Reflection Boulevard west / Camborne Parkway east – Jindalee, Butler	Traffic light controlled intersection
Wanneroo	Alkimos	29.4	18.3	Santorini Promenade – Alkimos	Roundabout
Wanneroo	Alkimos	30.5	19.0	Graceful Boulevard west / Romeo Road east – Alkimos	Traffic light controlled intersection. Romeo Road connects to northern terminus of the Mitchell Freeway.
Wanneroo	Alkimos	31.1	19.3	Brindabella Parkway west / Waadiny Parkway east – Alkimos	Traffic light controlled intersection. Access to Alkimos railway station
Wanneroo	Alkimos	32.0	19.9	Picasso Promenade – Alkimos	Roundabout
Wanneroo	Alkimos	32.6	20.3	Shorehaven Boulevard – Alkimos	T-junction
Wanneroo	Eglinton	34.0	21.1	Cinnabar Drive – Eglinton	Roundabout
Wanneroo	Eglinton	34.7	21.6	Eglinton Drive – Eglinton	Roundabout
Wanneroo	Eglinton	35.2	21.9	Carphin Drive – Eglinton	Roundabout, Carphin Drive currently unbuilt
Wanneroo	Eglinton	35.5	22.1	Pipidinny Road – Eglinton, Carabooda	Roundabout. Access to Eglinton railway station.
Wanneroo	Eglinton	36.6	22.7	Impressions Drive – Eglinton	Roundabout
Wanneroo	Yanchep	40.0	24.9	Lagoon Drive west / Peony Boulevard east – Yanchep	Traffic light controlled intersection
Wanneroo	Yanchep	40.4	25.1	Yanchep Beach Road – Yanchep, Two Rocks	State Route 71 northern terminus; Roundabout
Wanneroo	Yanchep	42.3	26.3	Botanic Boulevard – Yanchep	Roundabout;Access to Yanchep railway station
Wanneroo	Yanchep	42.9	26.7	Toreopango Avenue – Yanchep	Northern Terminus at uncontrolled T-intersection
Concurrency terminus; Unopened

== Gallery ==
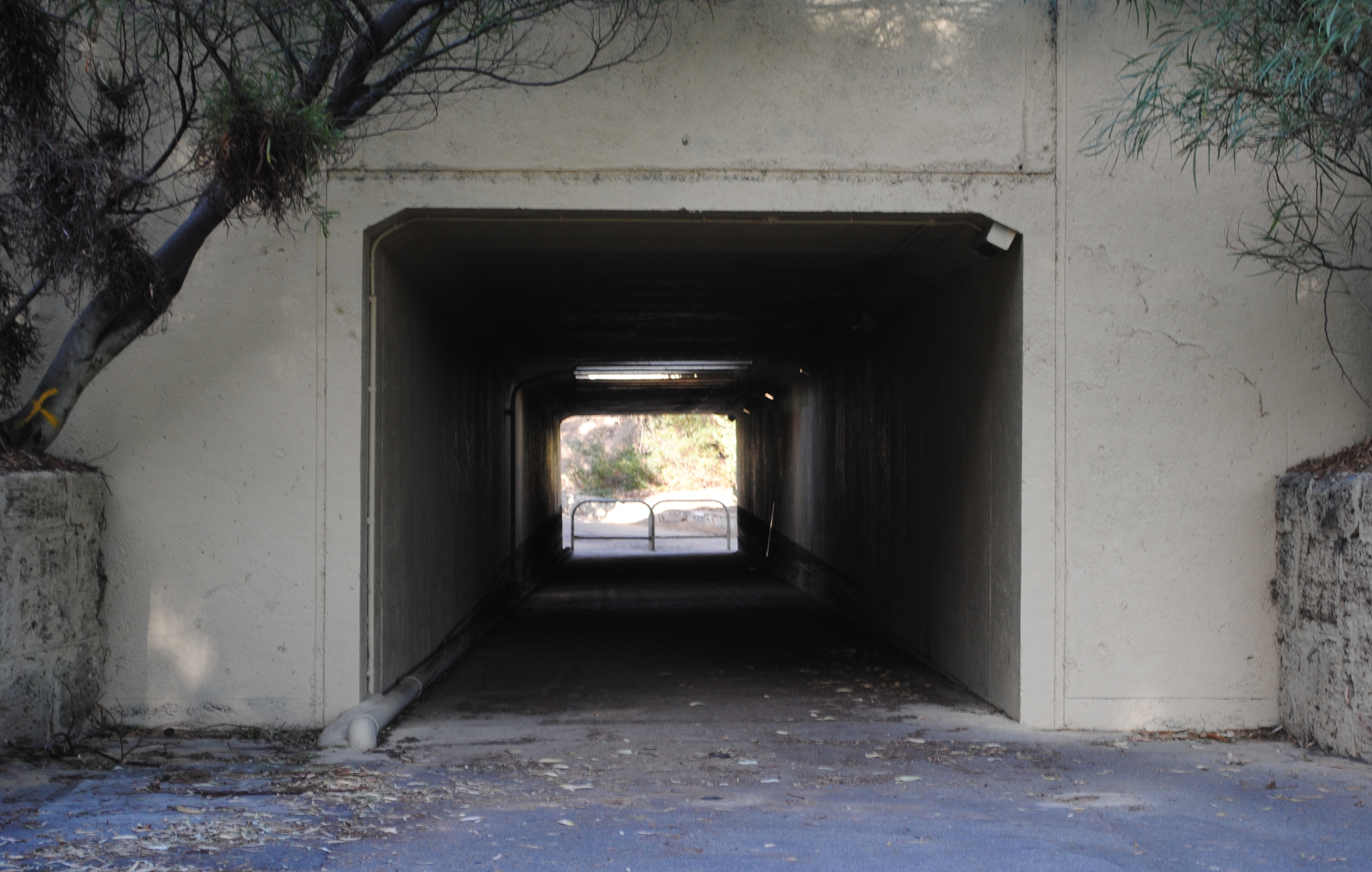
An underpass below Marmion Avenue, near Whitfords Avenue

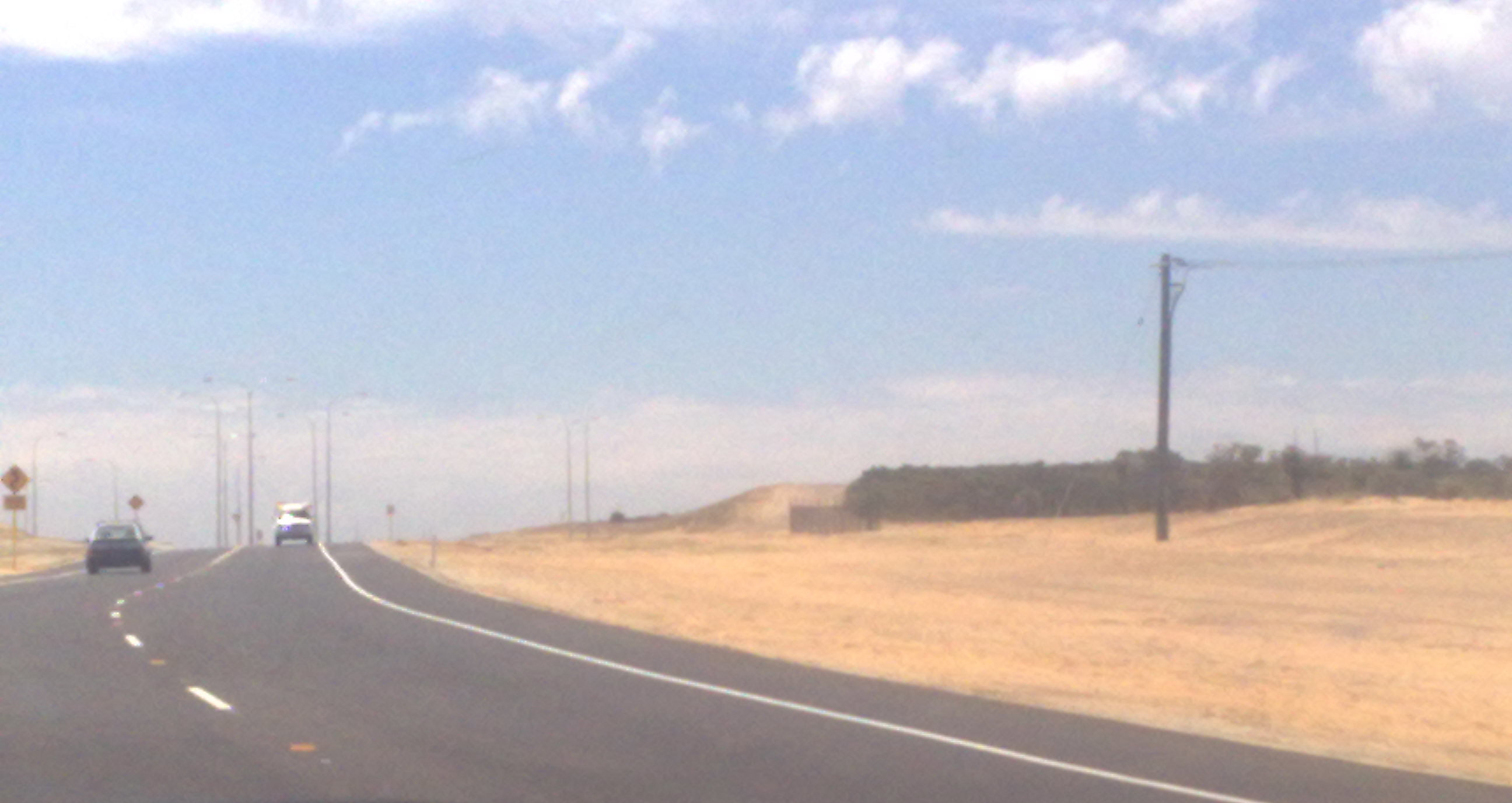
Single-laned extension of Marmion Avenue when opened in 2008, heading north in the then-undeveloped suburb of Alkimos

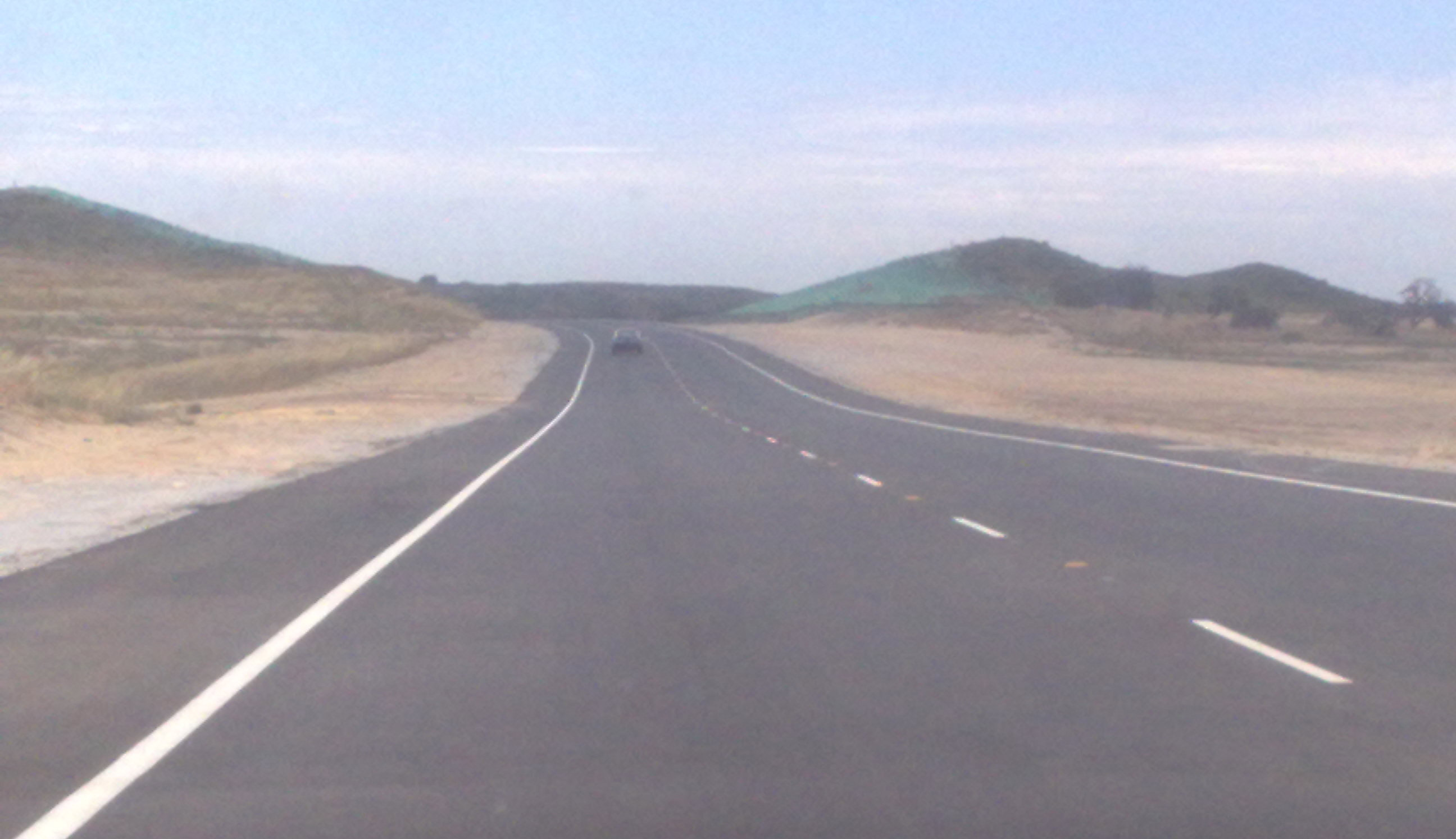
Single-laned extension of Marmion Avenue when opened in 2008, heading north in the then-undeveloped suburb of Eglinton

== See also ==
- West Coast Highway, Perth
- List of major roads in Perth, Western Australia
