= Burns Beach Road =

Road in Perth, Western Australia

Burns Beach Road Western Australia
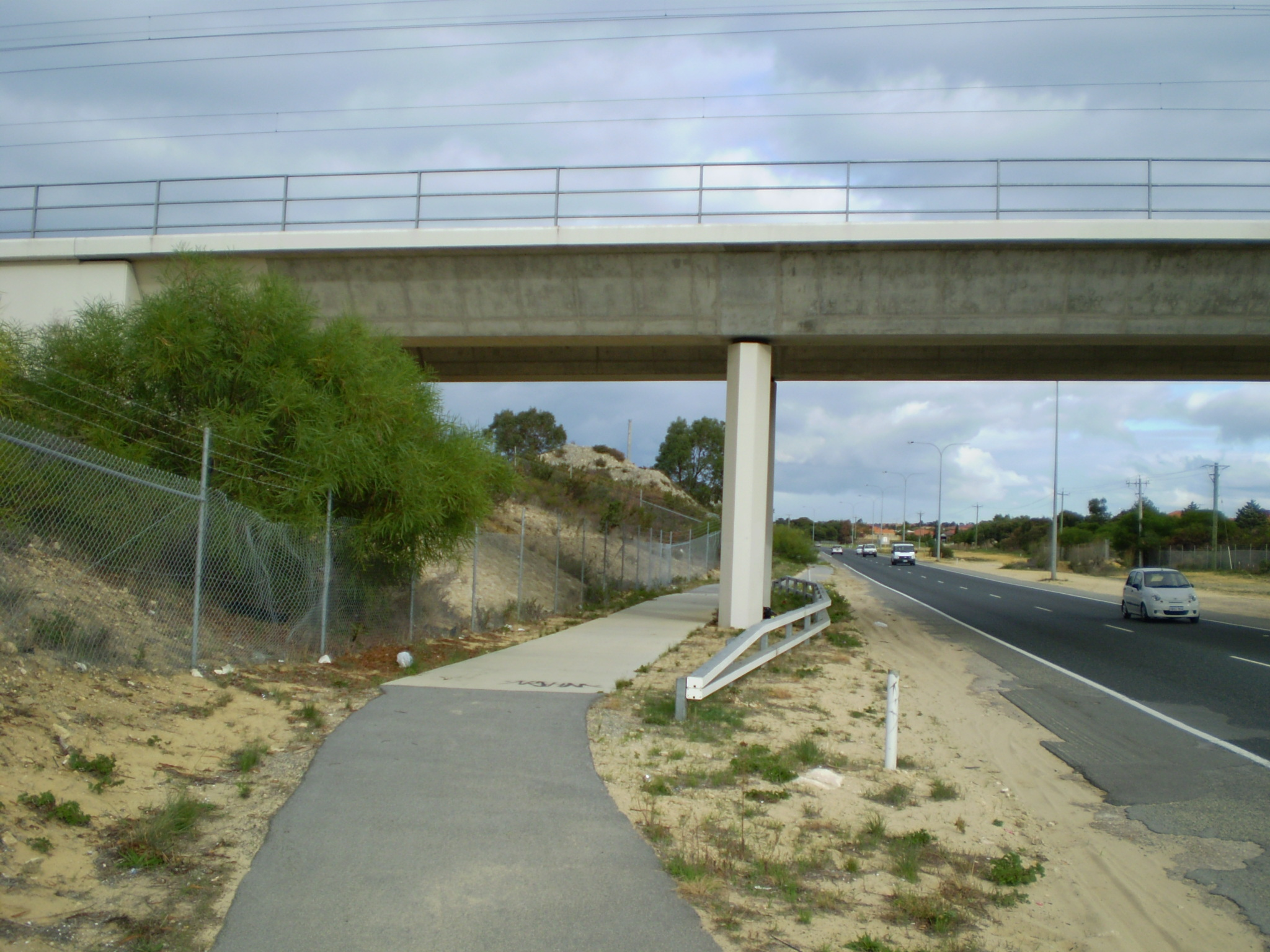
- Burns Beach Road – near Currambine Railway Station

General information
- Type: Road
- Length: 6.3 km (3.9 mi)
- Route number(s): State Route 87 (east of Marmion Avenue)

Major junctions
- Northeast end: Joondalup Drive (State Route 85), Joondalup
- Mitchell Freeway (State Route 2); Connolly Drive; Marmion Avenue (State Route 71)
- Southwest end: Shenton Avenue; Ocean Reef Road, Iluka

Location(s)
- Major suburbs: Neerabup, Kinross, Currambine, Burns Beach

Burns Beach Road is an arterial east-west road in Perth, Western Australia, linking the suburbs of Burns Beach and Iluka to the Mitchell Freeway and Joondalup. As of December 2023, only the road east of Marmion Avenue forms part of State Route 87 (the entirety of the road before then), and was the northern terminus of Mitchell Freeway and State Route 2 from 2008 to 2017, when the freeway was extended to Hester Avenue.

The road begins at a large roundabout with Joondalup Drive and used to end at the old coastal village of Burns Beach. The road has been realigned where the road into the village is now named Ocean Parade and Burns Beach Road continues along the coast from Ocean Parade to Shenton Avenue in Iluka. It formerly connected with Wanneroo Road but has been extensively realigned since. The road passes by the northern residential areas of Joondalup and forms the boundary between the suburbs of Currambine and Kinross.

The road's speed limit is 70 km/h for most of its length, decreasing to 60 km/h when approaching Burns Beach. The road is a dual carriageway from Joondalup Drive to Marmion Avenue.

Burns Beach Road provides direct access to Currambine railway station, located east of Connolly Drive.

== History ==
View west approaching Marmion Avenue

The road was known as Road No. 3883 on plans and maps.

Until the 1970s, Burns Beach Road was unmade along its entire length. Prior to 1984 and the construction of Joondalup, the road ran continuously without any intersections between Wanneroo Road and the village of Burns Beach, and was the only route into the village. In 1988, the road's alignment was shifted very slightly north between Connolly Drive and Joondalup Drive to accommodate the new suburb of Joondalup (North). The original path of Burns Beach Road, prior to 1988, is depicted on the following map.

In 1993, Burns Beach Road was further modified to bend south at the coast, in line with future plans for the road to run south along the coast to link up with Shenton Avenue. The original northerly alignment into Burns Beach was subsequently renamed Ocean Parade. The final phase of the road's relocation northwards, at Blue Mountain Drive, was not completed until around 1996. One can still see this path today where the road had a 90 degrees bend at Blue Mountain Drive, then along parts of Shinji Court, Windermere Circuit and Ohrid Place across the other side of Joondalup Drive, and into Drovers Place.

View east from Marmion Avenue to Mitchell Freeway

In 1996, Joondalup Drive underwent major re-construction, linking Joondalup to Wanneroo Road with safer roads. Burns Beach Road was cut shorter, joining with Joondalup Drive at a large roundabout a few hundred metres west of Wanneroo Road. At the same time the old stretch of Burns Beach Road alongside Joondalup Drive was renamed Drovers Place, and Burns Beach Road was also straightened out at Blue Mountain Drive. In the late 1990s, a large roundabout was also constructed to replace a stop-controlled intersection at Connolly Drive, in response to the growing suburban communities in Kinross and Currambine, and the heavier traffic. In the early 2000s, major work was done to improve the quality of the road west of Marmion Avenue, due to the growing residential area in Iluka.

In 2009, the Mitchell Freeway was extended to terminate at Burns Beach Road either side of the railway bridge north of Currambine Station. Because of this work, Burns Beach Road was turned into a dual-carriageway from Joondalup Drive to Marmion Avenue.

In 2017, Mitchell Freeway was extended to Hester Avenue, thus making a diamond interchange at what was the intersection.

In December 2023, the allocation of State Route 87 was removed from Burns Beach Road west of Marmion Avenue; State Route 87 now travels only between Marmion Avenue and Joondalup Drive.

== Major intersections ==
View west from Joondalup Drive to Mitchell Freeway

LGA	Location	km	mi	Destinations	Notes
Wanneroo-Joondalup boundary	Neerabup–Joondalup boundary	0.0	0.0	Joondalup Drive (State Route 85) – Bullsbrook, Carramar, Wanneroo, Edgewater	Eastern terminus at roundabout. State Route 87 concurrency terminus. Burns Beach east to Joondalup east free-flowing.
Wanneroo-Joondalup boundary	Kinross-Neerabup-Joondalup-Currambine quadripoint	1.9– 2.2	1.2– 1.4	Mitchell Freeway (State Route 2) – Yanchep, Clarkson, Stirling, Perth	Signalised diamond interchange favouring Mitchell Freeway
Joondalup	Kinross-Currambine boundary	2.4	1.5	Sunlander Drive	T junction, provides access to Currambine railway station
Joondalup	Kinross-Currambine boundary	2.7	1.7	Connolly Drive – Connolly, Tamala Park, Clarkson	Roundabout
Joondalup	Iluka–Burns Beach–Kinross–Currambine quadripoint	3.5	2.2	Marmion Avenue (State Route 71) – Yanchep, Clarkson, Hillarys, Scarborough	State Route 87 western terminus. Traffic light controlled intersection
Joondalup	Iluka–Burns Beach boundary	3.9	2.4	Delgado Parade	Roundabout
Joondalup	Iluka–Burns Beach boundary	4.6	2.9	Whitehaven Avenue north / Kontari Avenue south	Roundabout
Joondalup	Iluka–Burns Beach boundary	4.8	3.0	Ocean Parade west / Maui Entrance east	Roundabout
Joondalup	Iluka	5.1	3.2	Omara Boulevard	Roundabout
Joondalup	Iluka	5.7	3.5	Silver Sands Drive	Roundabout
Joondalup	Iluka–Ocean Reef boundary	6.3	3.9	Shenton Avenue – Currambine, Connolly, Joondalup	Western terminus at roundabout. Continues south as Ocean Reef Road (State Route 84)
1.000 mi = 1.609 km; 1.000 km = 0.621 mi: Route transition; Note: Intersections with minor local roads are not shown
