= Connolly, Western Australia =

Connolly
- Suburb
- Interactive map of Connolly
- Coordinates: 31.754°S 115.766°E
- Country: Australia
- State: Western Australia
- City: Perth
- LGA: City of Joondalup
- Location: 26 km (16 mi) NNW of Perth CBD
- Established: 1980s

Government
  - State electorate: Joondalup
  - Federal division: Moore

Area
  - Total: 2.8 km^{2} (1.1 sq mi)

Population
  - Total: 3,675 (SAL 2021)
- Postcode: 6027
Suburbs around Connolly
Iluka	Currambine	Joondalup
Ocean Reef	Connolly	Joondalup
Ocean Reef	Heathridge	Joondalup

Connolly is a northern suburb of Perth, Western Australia, located within the City of Joondalup adjacent to Joondalup's central business district. It was built in the late 1980s as a golf course estate. Its eastern border backs onto the Mitchell Freeway. Many homes feature on the edges of Connolly but the homes bordering the golf course are generally larger and more affluent.

The suburb was named in honour of John Connolly who held land in the area in 1838. Connolly was a private in the 63rd Regiment who arrived in the colony in 1829 and who farmed at Belhus and Bindoon after being discharged in 1834.

== Geography ==
Connolly is bounded by Shenton Avenue to the north, the Mitchell Freeway to the east, Hodges Drive to the south, and Marmion Avenue to the west.

Despite sharing the same name, only the southern terminus of Connolly Drive sits on the northern border of the suburb.

== Education ==
The suburb is served by a single primary school, Connolly Primary School, located on the eastern side of the suburb. Government school students attend different high schools based upon which side of the golf course they reside. Those on the western side attend Ocean Reef Senior High School, while those in the east attend Belridge Senior High School. Some students opt to attend Lake Joondalup Baptist College or Prendiville Catholic College, both independent schools.

== Significant events ==
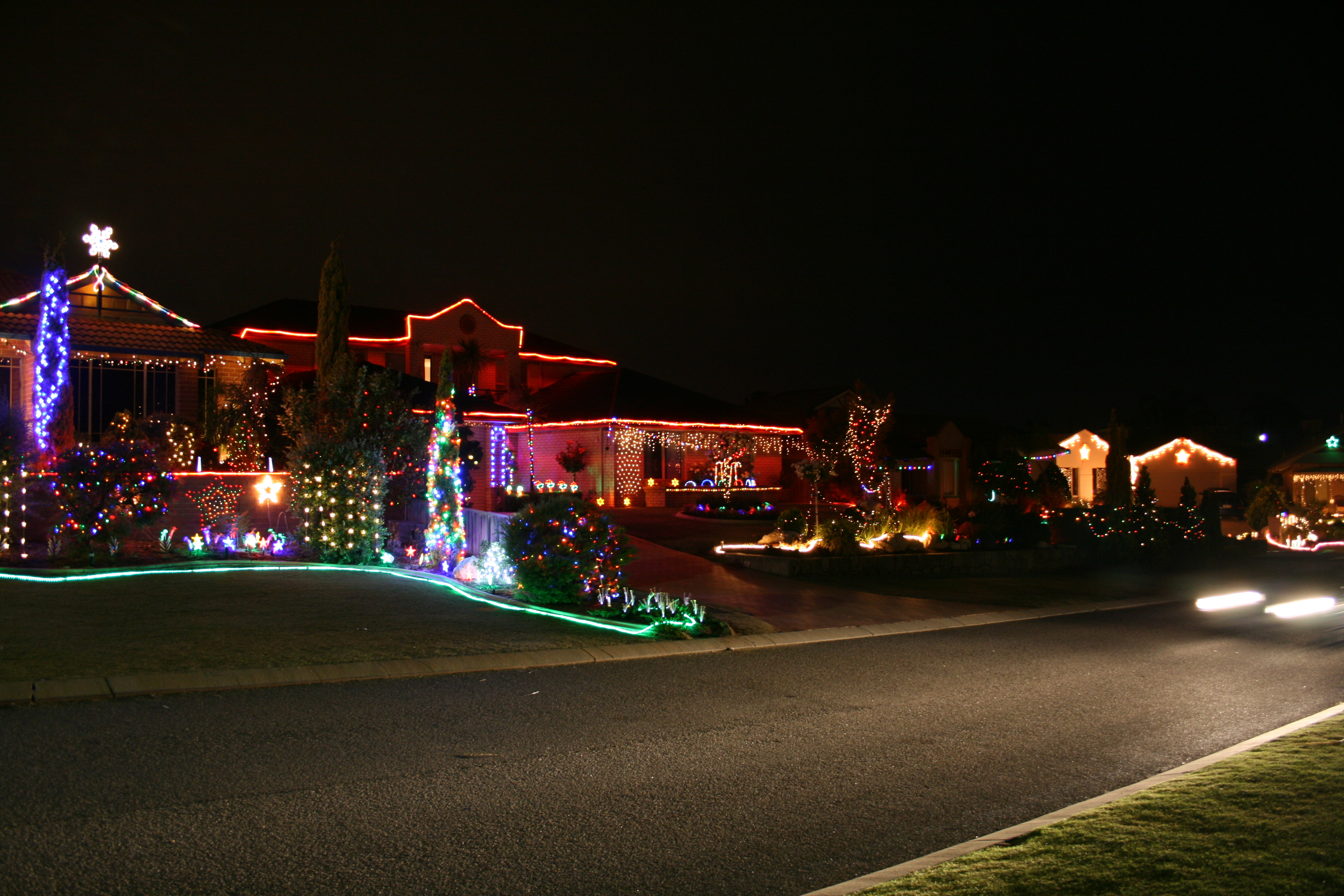
Prairie Dunes Place at night, Christmas 2007

An entire local street, namely Prairie Dunes Place has gained notability for its annual Christmas lights display. Since 1999, the street has been raising funds for the Association for the Blind WA and in this time has raised in excess of $80,000 [AUD] (2007) towards the training of guide dogs.

== Transport ==
The suburb is served by bus links that provide connections back to the Yanchep line via either Whitfords or Joondalup railway stations.

=== Bus ===
- 460 Joondalup Station to Whitfords Station – serves Shenton Avenue
- 461 Joondalup Station to Whitfords Station – serves Shenton Avenue and Marmion Avenue
- 470 Joondalup Station to Burns Beach – serves Shenton Avenue

Bus routes serving Hodges Drive:

- 462, 463 and 464 Joondalup Station to Whitfords Station
