= Joondalup railway station =

Railway station in Perth, Western Australia

Joondalup
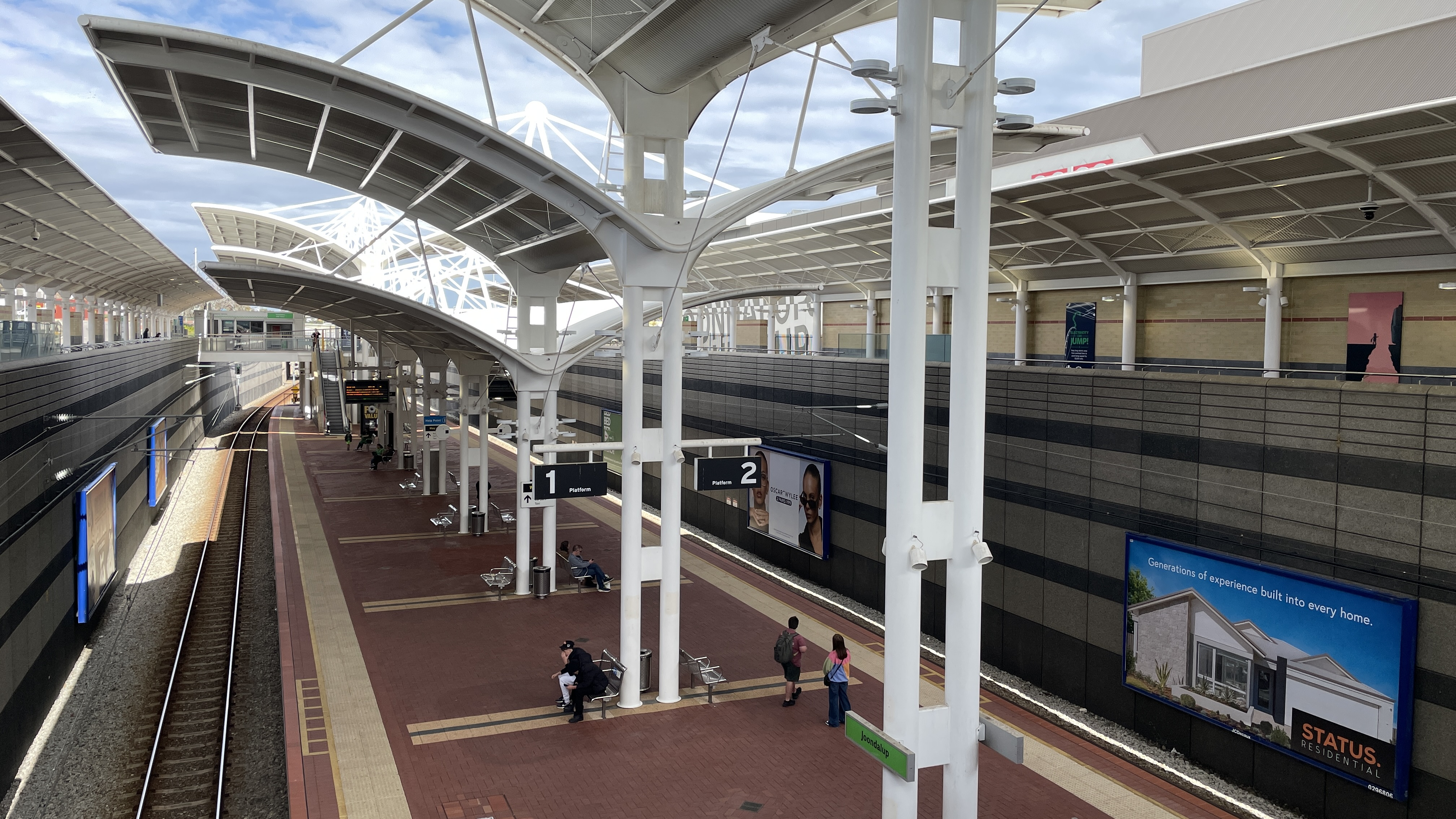
- Southbound view of the platforms

General information
- Location: Collier Pass, Joondalup; Australia
- Coordinates: 31°44′43″S 115°46′02″E
- Owner: Public Transport Authority
- Operator: Transperth Trains
- Line: Yanchep line
- Distance: 26.0 kilometres (16.2 mi) from Perth
- Platforms: 2 (1 island)
- Tracks: 2

Construction
- Structure type: Below ground
- Accessible: Yes

Other information
- Station code: JJP; 99871 (platform 1); 99872 (platform 2)
- Fare zone: 3

History
- Opened: 20 December 1992

Passengers
- March 2018: 5,300 per day

Services
Preceding station	Transperth	Following station
Edgewater towards Elizabeth Quay via Perth Underground	Yanchep line All, K	Currambine towards Clarkson or Yanchep
Location
- Location of Joondalup railway station

Joondalup railway station is a railway station on the Transperth network. It is located on the Yanchep line, 26 kilometres from Perth station serving the regional metropolitan city of Joondalup.

== History ==
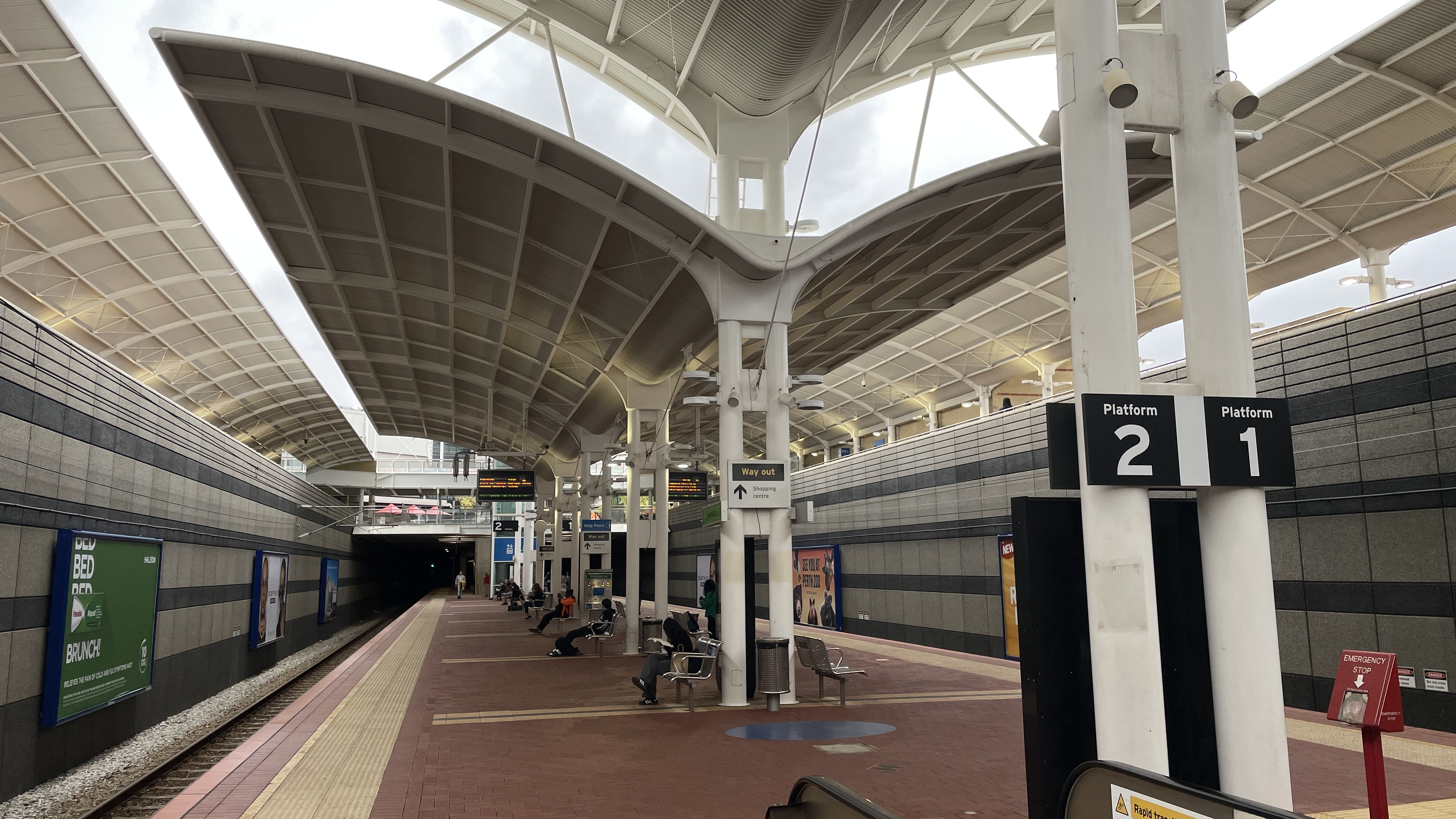
Platform 2

Joondalup station was built by Sabemo under a $5.2 million contract. Construction began in November 1991. Sabemo was awarded the main award at the state Master Builders Association's Excellence in Construction Awards in 1993 for the construction of Joondalup station.

Joondalup station opened on 20 December 1992 as the interim terminus of the Joondalup line (now called the Yanchep line), before being extended to Currambine in August 1993.

In 2003, the contract for extending the platforms on seven Joondalup line stations, including Joondalup station, was awarded to Lakis Constructions. The platforms on these stations had to be extended by 50 metres (160 ft) to accommodate 150-metre (490 ft) long six-car trains, which were planned to enter service. Along with the extensions, the platform edges were upgraded to bring them into line with tactile paving standards. Work on this station was done in mid-2004.

== Services ==
Joondalup station is served by Transperth Yanchep line service trains . The station is also served by multiple Transperth buses and Transwa road coaches.

=== Train services ===
Trains serving Joondalup continue north to either Clarkson or Yanchep as K pattern or All stations pattern services.Trains heading south through-run with Mandurah line services at Elizabeth Quay where they terminate.

==== Platforms ====
Joondalup platform arrangement
Stop ID	Platform	Line	Service Pattern	Destination	Via	Notes
99871	1	Yanchep line	All stations, K	Elizabeth Quay	Perth Underground	
99872	2	Yanchep line	All stations	Yanchep		
99872	2	Yanchep line	K	Clarkson		

=== Bus services ===
Joondalup station is served by the following Transperth bus routes, including the Central Area Transit (CAT) services which operate a free shuttle around the suburb on weekdays and selected public holidays. These routes are primarily operated by two electric buses in a special red livery, which entered service in February 2022 as the first fully electric buses for Transperth. In mid-2022, two more electric buses entered service in a normal green livery, operating fare-paying routes around the area. These buses are charged nightly at the Joondalup Bus Depot. Joondalup is also served by Transwa road coach services to Perth Coach Terminal and Geraldton.

==== Bus stands ====
Stop	Route	Destination / description	Notes
Stand 1		Set Down	
Stand 1	N5 PG Odds	to Geraldton via Cervantes and Dongara	Transwa service
Stand 1	N5 PG Evens	to East Perth Terminal	Transwa service
Stand 2	390	to Banksia Grove via Burns Beach Road & Tapping	Select services deviate via Joseph Banks Secondary College & Banksia Grove Primary School
Stand 2	391	to Banksia Grove via Burns Beach Road & Carramar	Select services extend to Joseph Banks Secondary College.
Stand 3	467	to Whitfords station via Ashby & Hocking	
Stand 3	468	to Whitfords station via Wanneroo Road	
Stand 4	460	to Whitfords station via Shenton Avenue & Oceanside Prom	
Stand 4	461	to Whitfords station via Shenton Avenue & Marmion Avenue	
Stand 5	470	to Burns Beach via Iluka	
Stand 5	471	to Burns Beach via Currambine	
Stand 5	473	to Kinross via Blue Mountain Drive	
Stand 5	474	to Clarkson station via Kinross	
Stand 6	462	to Whitfords station via Hodges Drive & Marmion Avenue	
Stand 6	463	to Whitfords station via Heathridge	
Stand 7	464	to Whitfords station via Heathridge & Eddystone Avenue	
Stand 7	465	to Whitfords station' via Trappers Drive	
Stand 7	466	to Whitfords station via Timberlane Drive	
Stand 8	10 Red CAT	Joondalup Circular Service (anti-clockwise)	Usually operated by electric buses
Stand 8	13 Yellow CAT	Edith Cowan University Joondalup Circular Service (Monday to Thursday ECU days only)	Usually operated by electric buses
Stand 9	11 Blue CAT	Joondalup Circular Service (clockwise)	Usually operated by electric buses
Stand 9	904	Rail replacement service to Yanchep station	
Stand 10	681	to Crown Perth, Burswood	
Stand 10	904	Rail replacement service to Perth station	
