= Mullaloo, Western Australia =

Mullaloo
- Suburb
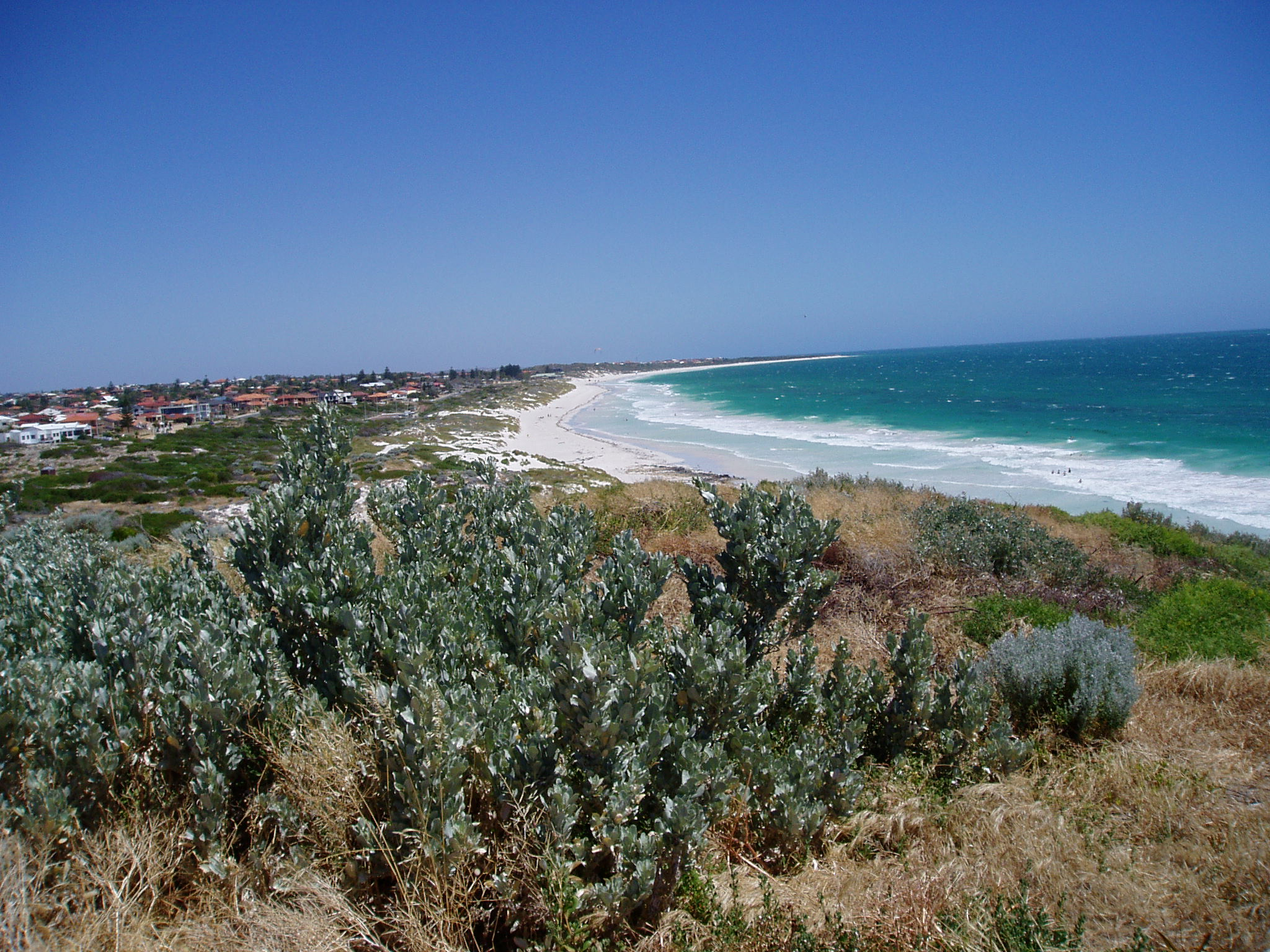
- Mullaloo Beach, Western Australia
- Interactive map of Mullaloo
- Coordinates: 31.783°S 115.738°E
- Country: Australia
- State: Western Australia
- City: Perth
- LGA: City of Joondalup
- Location: 25 km (16 mi) from Perth
- Established: 1950s

Government
  - State electorate: Hillarys
  - Federal division: Moore

Population
  - Total: 6,190 (SAL 2021)
- Postcode: 6027
Suburbs around Mullaloo
	Ocean Reef	Heathridge
Indian Ocean	Mullaloo	Beldon
	Kallaroo	Craigie

Mullaloo is a northern coastal suburb of Perth, Western Australia, within the City of Joondalup.

== History ==
Mullaloo is named after an Aboriginal word, believed to mean "place of the rat kangaroo". It was first recorded in 1919 as Moolalloo Point, but the spelling was later changed to Mullaloo. Urban development began in the late 1950s.

== Today ==
The Mullaloo Surf Life Saving club primary area of patrol is within 400 metres of the Mullaloo Surf Life Saving Club rooms and is patrolled every weekend and public holiday commencing October through to April. The club has row teams, swim teams, board teams and sprint teams.

Mullaloo has two schools, Mullaloo Beach Primary School and Mullaloo Heights Primary School. Enrolment currently stands at 272 at Mullaloo Heights.

== Transport ==
=== Bus ===
- 460 Whitfords Station to Joondalup Station – serves Northshore Drive, Oceanside Promenade and Ocean Reef Road
- 461 Whitfords Station to Joondalup Station – serves Dampier Avenue and Ocean Reef Road
- 462 Whitfords Station to Joondalup Station – serves Mullaloo Drive and Marmion Avenue

== Notable people ==
- Shalom Brune-Franklin, actress (Doctor Doctor, The Tourist), grew up in Mullaloo.
