= Kinross, Western Australia =

Kinross
- Suburb
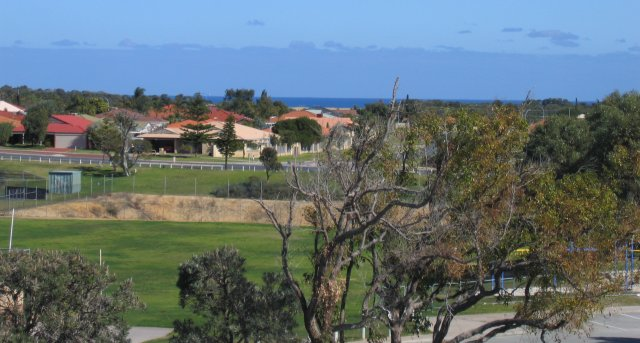
- View over Kinross Primary School with the Indian Ocean in the distance
- Interactive map of Kinross
- Coordinates: 31.722°S 115.74°E
- Country: Australia
- State: Western Australia
- City: Perth
- LGA: City of Joondalup
- Location: 32 km (20 mi) from Perth
- Established: 1993

Government
  - State electorate: Ocean Reef
  - Federal division: Moore

Population
  - Total: 6,988 (SAL 2021)
- Postcode: 6028
Suburbs around Kinross
Tamala Park	Tamala Park	Neerabup
Burns Beach	Kinross	Neerabup
Iluka	Currambine	Joondalup

Kinross is a small suburb in the City of Joondalup located in the northern suburbs of Perth in Western Australia. Kinross was constructed around 1992–1993 in various stages. It is bordered by Neerabup National Park to the northeast, Tamala Park to the north, Burns Beach to the west and Currambine to the south. It is the City of Joondalup's northernmost suburb.

Kinross mostly contains young families and overseas migrants, especially from the United Kingdom, Ireland and South Africa. Several parks are dotted through the suburb, most of which offer playground facilities.

The Scottish influence in Kinross extends throughout the suburb with road names, parks and others mainly derived from Scottish place names, for example Glencoe Loop, Edinburgh Avenue, Roxburgh Circle, Selkirk Drive, Falkirk Court, Ben Nevis Turn, and Coatbridge Circuit.

== Facilities ==
The schools are in the heart of the suburb located along Kinross Drive and Callander Avenue. Kinross Primary School was opened in 1995, and Kinross College, formerly a middle school serving years 6-10, now a 7-12 high school. was opened in 2002.

Kinross has its own football club (Westside Soccer Club), which plays its home matches at the MacNaughton Park ground. There is a skate park and community centre next to MacNaughton Park.

There are two suburban shopping centres, one located along Kinross Drive which includes a pharmacy, medical centre, convenience store, fast food takeaways, real estate agency, dog groomers, hair dressers. A new shopping centre called Kinross Central on the corner of Connolly Drive and Selkirk Drive has been opened in recent years.

Kinross Central

== Demographics ==
According to the 2016 census, Kinross had a population of 6,980. 0.5% of the total population are Indigenous Australians (Aboriginals and Torres Strait Islanders). 44% of the population are aged between 25 and 54 years, while 21.7% of the population are up to 14 years. The percentages of these age groups are higher than the respective national percentages of 41.2% and 18.7%. Also, 8.5% of the population are aged above 65, which is significantly less than the Australian population percentage of 15.8%.

49.7% of the population were born in Australia, which is significantly less than the Australian population percentage of 66.7%. The most common other countries of birth were England 22.9%, South Africa 4.5%, Scotland 3.9%, New Zealand 3.1% and Ireland 1.8%. The most popular language spoken at home other than English was Afrikaans (1.8%).

The most common responses for religion in Kinross were No Religion 36.7%, Catholic 20.6%, and Anglican 18.5%.

== Transport ==
Kinross is located northeast of Marmion Avenue and Burns Beach Road, and the Mitchell Freeway which extends to Burns Beach Road. The southeastern corner of Kinross is also served by the Currambine railway station, whilst other sections are served by one of three Transperth bus routes operated by Swan Transit which run between Joondalup station and Clarkson station. The 471 service travels along Marmion Avenue, turns into Edinburgh Avenue and onto Kinross Drive, it travels to the most northerly point of Kinross Drive where it terminates. The 473 service duplicates the route that the 474 takes through Kinross, except that the 473 terminates at Duart Pass. The 474 service proceeds along Connolly Drive, turning onto Selkirk Drive and MacNaughton Crescent, onto Geoff Russell Avenue across to Kinross Drive. The 474 (via Marmion Avenue) terminates at Clarkson Train Station.
