= Currambine, Western Australia =

Currambine Perth, Western Australia
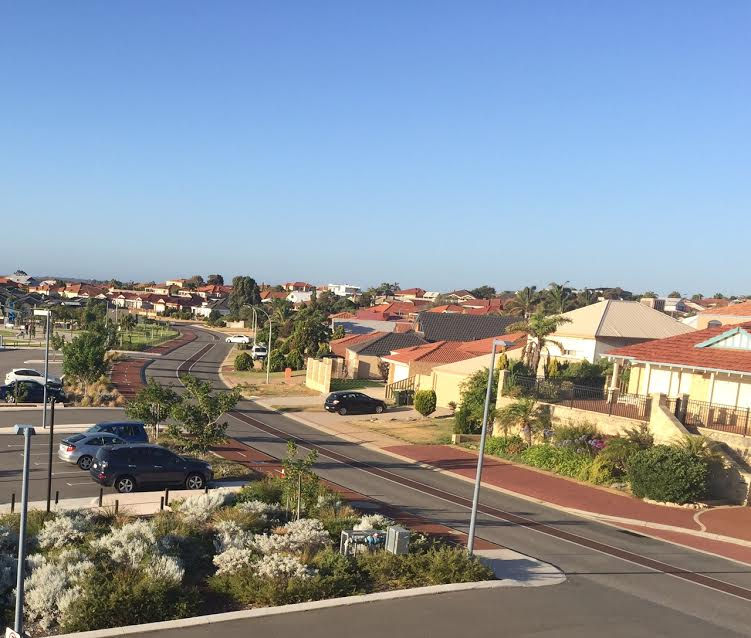
- Delamere Avenue, Currambine
- Coordinates: 31.732°S 115.751°E
- Population: 6,834 (SAL 2021)
- Established: 1980s
- Postcode(s): 6028
- Area: 3.1 km^{2} (1.2 sq mi)
- Location: 29 km (18 mi) from Perth CBD; 2 km (1 mi) from Joondalup
- LGA(s): City of Joondalup
- State electorate(s): Ocean Reef, Joondalup
- Federal division(s): Moore
Suburbs around Currambine:
| Burns Beach | Kinross | Neerabup |
| Iluka | Currambine | Joondalup |
| Ocean Reef | Connolly | Joondalup |

Currambine is a northern suburb of Perth, the capital city of Western Australia, 29 km north of Perth's central business district. Its local government area is the City of Joondalup.

== History ==
Currambine was approved as a suburb name in 1980. The name was chosen by the City of Wanneroo in 1979 from a book by A.W. Reed. It is an Aboriginal word from New South Wales meaning "heaps of rocks".

Currambine was developed as a chiefly residential suburb in the mid-1990s on land adjacent to the Currambine train station, which was built and opened in 1993.

== Geography ==
Currambine is bounded by Burns Beach Road to the north, Marmion Avenue to the west, Shenton Avenue to the south and Mitchell Freeway to the west. The suburb is effectively divided into quarters by the dual carriageways Connolly Drive (north-south) and Moore Drive (east-west).

== Demographics ==
At the 2016 Australian census, Currambine had a population of 6,912 people living in 2,576 dwellings. According to the 2011 census, Currambine's workforce mostly consists of professionals; technicians and trade workers; and clerical and administrative workers.

== Facilities ==
Currambine is a residential suburb, and is served by the Currambine Central shopping centre at its southwestern corner.

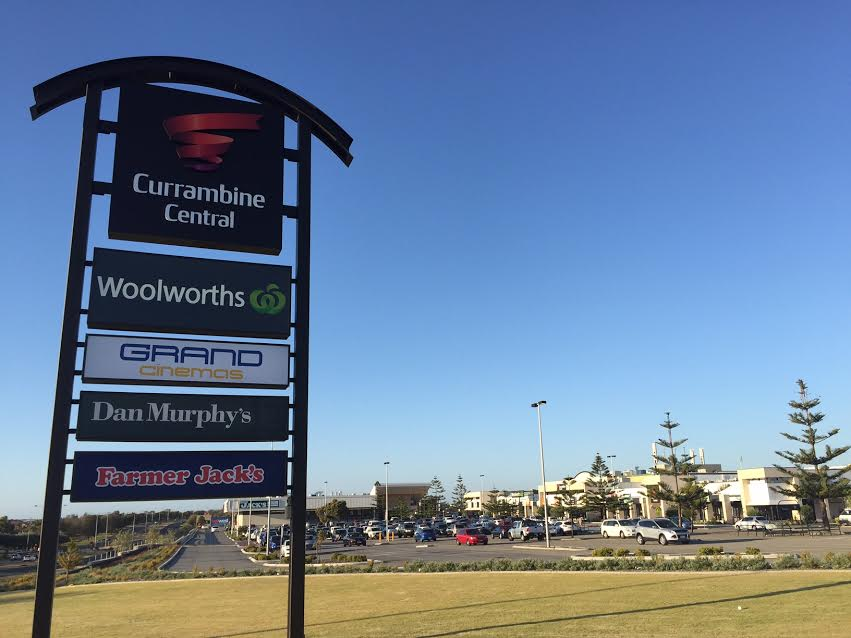
Currambine Central.

The southeastern part of the suburb contains 5 holes of the 27-hole Joondalup Golf Course, part of the Joondalup Resort complex based in neighbouring Connolly. The suburb also contains two primary schools, one public (1997 Currambine Primary School) and one private (Francis Jordan Catholic School). The suburb is within Ocean Reef Senior High School's catchment area to the west of Connolly Drive and Belridge Secondary College to the east of Connolly Drive . A community centre is also available for use, located near Currambine Central.

== Transport ==
Currambine is served by the 460, 461, 470, these three buses run through Shenton Ave 471 and 472 Transperth bus routes from Joondalup, operated by Swan Transit and by the Currambine railway station.

=== Bus ===
- 471 Joondalup Station to Burns Beach – serves Moore Drive and Marmion Avenue
- 473 Joondalup Station to Kinross – serves Burns Beach Road
- 474 Joondalup Station to Clarkson Station – serves Burns Beach Road

Bus routes serving Shenton Avenue:

- 460 and 461 Joondalup Station to Whitfords Station
- 470 Joondalup Station to Burns Beach

=== Rail ===
- Yanchep line
  - Currambine Station

== Politics ==
Currambine is a fairly new suburb and a classic "mortgage belt" suburb which leans towards the Liberal Party in federal elections and the Australian Labor Party in state elections, in line with many northern Perth suburbs. This has changed in recent elections with majority voting for Liberal in the state elections. As Currambine is a part of two state electorates it is represented by both Mark Folkard: Burns Beach and Emily Hamilton: Joondalup, both of which are Labor representatives.

2004 federal election
| Liberal | 55% |
| Labor | 35% |
| Greens | 4.9% |
| CDP | 2.4% |
| One Nation | 1.8% |

2001 federal election
| Liberal | 47% |
| Labor | 40% |
| Greens | 3.9% |
| Democrats | 3.6% |
| One Nation | 3.4% |

2005 state election
| Labor | 49% |
| Liberal | 39% |
| Greens | 6.2% |
| Family First | 4.3% |
| CDP | 3.3% |

2001 state election
| Liberal | 42% |
| Labor | 39% |
| Greens | 6.4% |
| One Nation | 5.0% |
| CDP | 4.2% |

== See also ==
- Currambine railway station
