= Albert Jacob =

Australian politician (born 1980)

The Honourable Albert Jacob JP
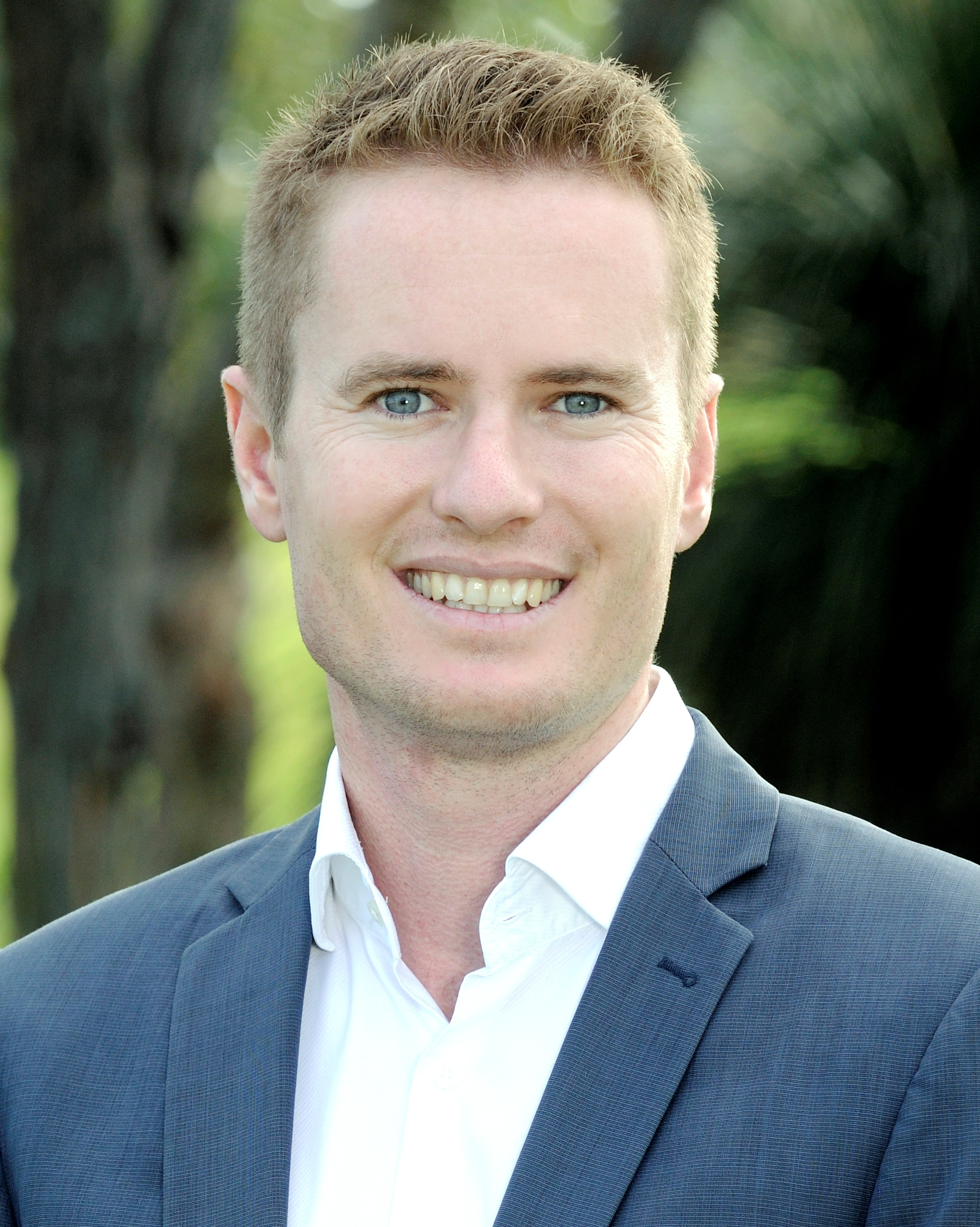

Mayor of Joondalup
- In office 21 October 2017 – 17 October 2025
- Governor: Kerry Sanderson; Kim Beazley; Chris Dawson
- Preceded by: Troy Pickard
- Succeeded by: Daniel Kingston

Minister for Environment and Heritage
- In office 21 March 2013 – 11 March 2017
- Premier: Colin Barnett
- Preceded by: Bill Marmion
- Succeeded by: Stephen Dawson

Member of the Western Australian Legislative Assembly for Ocean Reef
- In office 6 September 2008 – 11 March 2017
- Preceded by: Seat created
- Succeeded by: Seat abolished

Personal details
- Born: 16 March 1980 (age 46) Subiaco, Western Australia
- Party: Liberal
- Education: University of Western Australia
- Awards: 2004 UWA "Association of Consulting Architects Prize" Winner, 40under40 Award (2016)

Albert Paul Jacob (born 16 March 1980) is an Australian politician. He was the mayor of the City of Joondalup from 2017 to 2025, the member for the Western Australian Legislative Assembly seat of Ocean Reef from 2008 to 2017, and the Minister for the Environment and Heritage in Colin Barnett's government. He had previously served as the Parliamentary Secretary for Community Services; Seniors and Volunteering and Youth, from June 2012 to March 2013. His seat was abolished prior to the 2017 state election and he was defeated contesting Burns Beach.

== Early life ==
Jacob was born in Subiaco, Western Australia on 16 March 1980. He grew up in Wanneroo, and was educated at Kingsway Christian College. He was a horticulturist before studying at the University of Western Australia and graduating with a Bachelor of Environmental Design, and a Masters in Architecture.

Jacob has always lived in the northern suburbs of Perth.

== Politics ==
Jacob's career in state parliament began on 6 September 2008 when he was elected the inaugural member for the Western Australian state seat of Ocean Reef. Prior to that he had served almost three years on the Joondalup City Council in the North Central Ward.

He was appointed Environment and Heritage Minister in March 2013, following the re-election of the Liberal-National coalition government. Then aged 33, his appointment saw him become one of the youngest ministers ever appointed in Western Australia.

Jacob's other committee and community activities include having been the inaugural chair of both the Tamala Park Coastal Reserve Community Advisory Committee and the Mitchell Freeway Extension Community Reference Group, as well as serving as a local Justice of the Peace. He was the inaugural deputy chair of the Ocean Reef Marina Committee, and was also the deputy chair of the Parliamentary Standing Committee on Community Development and Justice for four years.

=== Environment and heritage ===
In June 2013, Jacob oversaw creation of the Department of Parks and Wildlife along with the Department of Environment Regulation, replacing the Department of Environment and Conservation. He also introduced an $81.5 million Kimberley Science and Conservation Strategy to provide for long-term conservation of the Kimberley region, particularly the protection of the region's unique animals, plants and marine environment. He also oversaw the $21-million Parks for People initiative, proposing to create 450 new camp and caravan sites in 16 of the state's national parks. Immediately following the defeat of the Barnett Government in March 2017, those departments and projects were merged into the Department of Biodiversity, Conservation and Attractions (DBCA).

As Heritage Minister, Jacob established a Heritage Revolving Fund to provide seed money for refurbishment of government-owned heritage buildings. Proceeds from the sale of these properties would fund future projects.

=== Local government ===
Jacob was elected Mayor of the City of Joondalup in October 2017, succeeding Troy Pickard. He was re-elected in October 2021. His term expired in October 2025. Jacob believes that voting in local government elections should be compulsory.

=== Senate speculation ===
In November 2020, it was reported that religious conservatives in the WA Liberal Party had wanted to remove WA Liberal senator, Dean Smith, from the party's ticket for the next Senate election, in favour of Jacob. These claims were later shown to be unfounded.

=== Controversy ===
As the WA Environment Minister, Albert Jacob supported clearing natural bushland for the controversial Roe 8 road project. In April 2024, Jacob apologised to council members for breaching conduct by using profanity and slamming a desk during a CEO Performance Review Committee.

Western Australian Legislative Assembly
| New seat | Member for Ocean Reef; 2008–2017 | Abolished |
