= Lakeside Joondalup =

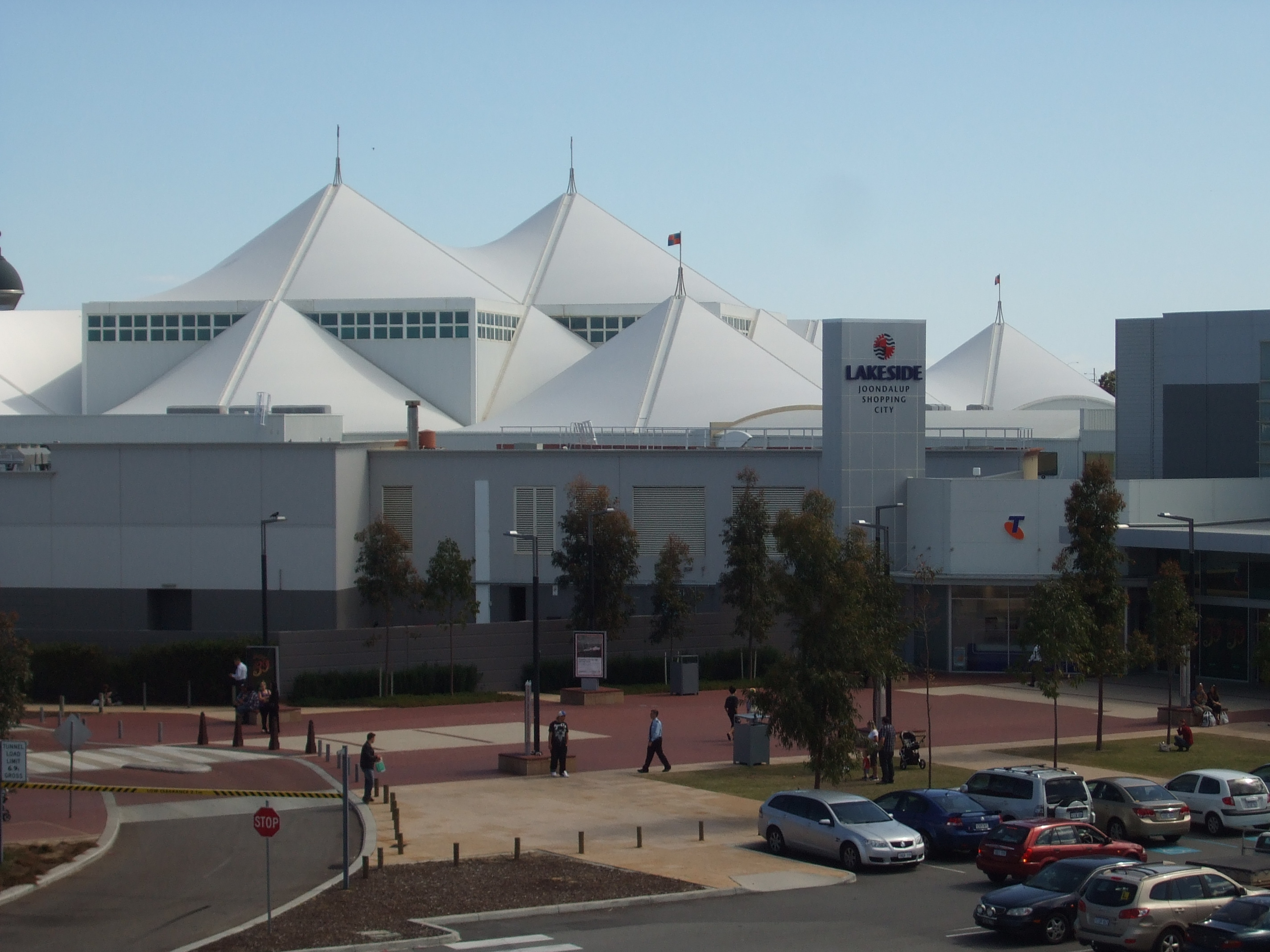
- Lakeside Joondalup viewed from the multi-storey car park
- Location: Joondalup, Western Australia
- Coordinates: 31°44′39″S 115°46′02″E
- Opened: 2 November 1994
- Developer: ING Real Estate
- Manager: Vicinity Centres; Lendlease (former)
- Owner: Cbus Property (50%); Vicinity Centres (50%)
- Num. of stores: 300+
- Num. of anchor tenants: 8
- Floor area: 96,000 m^{2} (1,030,000 sq ft)
- Floors: 2
- Parking: 4,800 parking bays, approximately 1,500 undercover
- Website: Official website
- Information from Lakeside Joondalup

Lakeside Joondalup is a major shopping centre in the Perth suburb of Joondalup. Located adjacent to the Joondalup railway station, it is the third largest shopping centre in Western Australia after Westfield Carousel and Karrinyup Shopping Centre. The centre contains three supermarkets, Woolworths, Coles and Aldi, three discount department stores, Big W, Kmart and Target, and the department store Myer.

== History and development ==
Construction of the centre commenced in 1991, and it opened in late November 1994. The latest redevelopment was completed in November 2014.

=== Redevelopments ===
The centre has undergone a number of relevant extensions and developments since opening.

==== Stage 1 ====
The cinema, originally opened as a Greater Union, was constructed on top of the Joondalup railway line reserve and opened in 1998. In 2004, the cinema was sold to Grand Cinemas. It is now run by Hoyts after Grand Cinemas' collapse.

==== Stage 2 ====
In 1999, the centre added a Target department store to the south-west corner. The area was originally left vacant and was secured until the construction phase began.

==== Stage 3 ====
Construction of the Mini-Major block which currently contains an Aldi and Chemist Warehouse

Lakeside Joondalup Shopping City was developed extensively between 2006 and 2007, expanding to about twice of its original size. The redevelopment was completed in late 2008.

Valued at A$116 million in 2006, the expansion included a new major supermarket, department store and some 100 speciality stores, as well as adding a four-storey parking structure of 1,710 new car bays located on the south eastern side of the site. The new extensions connect with the existing centre via an enclosed area over Station Square. As part of the extension, ING Real Estate's existing air rights lease over the railway line was converted to freehold title. It was a condition of development approval that public access be maintained from the commencement to cessation of rail services at the adjoining Joondalup Interchange.

The first portion of Stage 3 was opened to the public on 7 December 2007. This portion included the Fashion Mall (located within the old East Mall area), the Station Square precinct, the relocated Food Court, as well as a small selection of speciality retail stores.

The second portion of Stage 3 was opened to the public in April 2008. This allowed access between the lower part of the centre to the adjoining road of Boas Avenue. The remainder of Stage 3 was opened to the public on 4 December 2008. In 2010 the centre was sold to Lendlease and the Future Fund with each owning 50%.

==== Stage 4 ====
In 2012, the centre began further expansion of the centre to the south. The first stage of the expansion opened in March 2014, and included a new multi-storey carpark (800 bays) and 20 specialty stores. This was shortly followed by the opening of an expanded Coles supermarket. The second stage, consisting of a new Myer department store, a new fashion mall, second food court and alfresco dining precinct, opened in November 2014. In December 2014, a new food court opened above the existing food court adding six new food tenants to the centre.

A third stage of expansion continued throughout 2015. This stage included a number of new food establishments, bars, and specialty fashion retailers.

In August 2024, the Future Fund sold its 50% shareholding to Vicinity Centres.

In August 2026, Lendlease sold its stake in the property to Cbus Property, in the process of winding up of the troubled Australian Prime Property Fund after it was crippled with redemption requests from investors.

== Architectural features ==
The most striking feature of the centre is the main area known as The Great Space. It consists of a number of white tent-like structures covering the major area, with a large inbuild centre stage and display area located in the middle. Also inside Lakeside Joondalup are many variety stores featured within the "Great Space" which offer a variety of different products to centre customers.

== Transport ==
Adjoining the centre is the Joondalup railway station, opened in 1993. It is on the Yanchep railway line as well as being served by numerous Transperth bus routes covering suburbs from Whitfords to Clarkson and beyond.

== Facilities ==
South Mall

The centre has a number of restrooms facilities located at entry points and lifts throughout the two story section and carparks. The shopping centre also has taxi ranks and set downs at the north, east and west entrances. All are wheelchair accessible.

=== Major precincts ===
The centre is divided into a number of areas including:

- The Great Space
- East Mall
- Fashion Mall
- Food Court
- Fresh Food Court
- Station Square
- Fresco
- South Mall
- North Mall
- West Mall
