= Joondalup Health Campus =

Hospital in Perth, Western Australia

- Ramsay Health Care
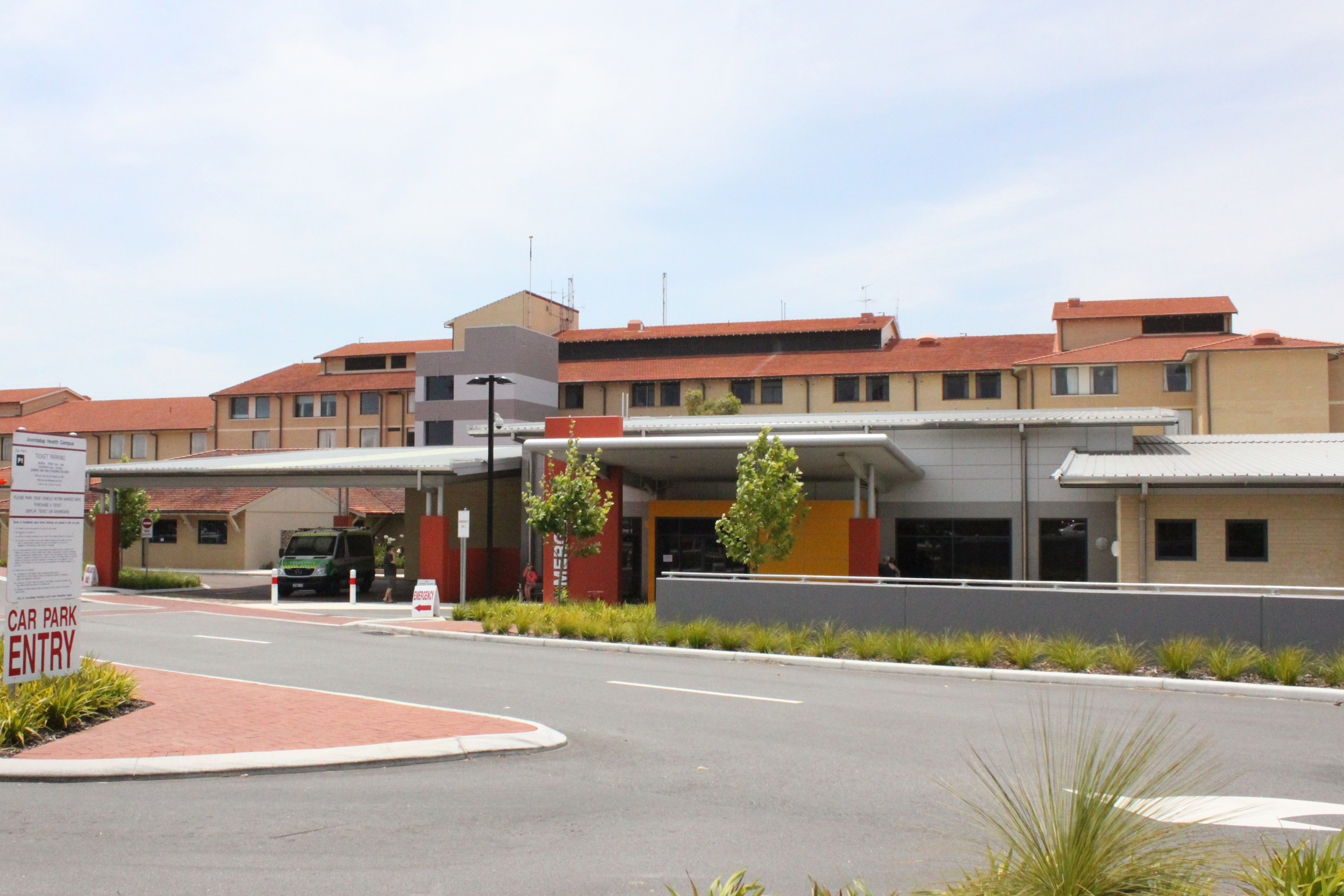

Geography
- Location: Corner of Grand Boulevard and Shenton Avenue, Joondalup, City of Joondalup, Western Australia, Australia
- Coordinates: 31°44′22″S 115°46′21″E (Emergency); 31°44′20″S 115°46′17″E (Public hospital main entry); 31°44′21″S 115°46′25″E (Private hospital main entry)

Organisation
- Care system: Medicare; Private
- Type: General; Teaching; Specialist
- Affiliated university: Curtin University; Edith Cowan University; UWA
- Network: North Metropolitan Health Service

Services
- Standards: Australian Health Care Standards
- Emergency department: Yes
- Beds: 722

Helipads
- Helipad: None

History
- Founded: 1996; 30 years ago

Links
- Website: www.joondaluphealthcampus.com.au
- Lists: Hospitals in Australia

Joondalup Health Campus (JHC) is the largest health care facility in the northern suburbs of Perth, Western Australia. The 722-bed hospital has featured combined public and private services since 1996. In March 2013, the new Joondalup Private Hospital opened next to the existing hospital, within the same campus. The public and private hospitals share the emergency department, operating theatres and intensive care facilities, and the hospital's campus is now run by Ramsay Health Care, which also operates Attadale Rehabilitation Hospital, Glengarry Private Hospital and Hollywood Private Hospital.

== History ==
On 24 April 1996, then Health Minister Kevin Prince announced an expansion of the old Wanneroo hospital into a health campus. The tender to operate the facility was won by HealthCare Australia while the facility would be built by John Holland. The agreement to operate would last for twenty years. The agreement would provide care for both public and private patients with the current 84-beds increase to 330-beds of which 70 would be private beds. It would provide for an upgraded emergency service, 25-bed psychiatric services, aged care restorative unit, improved surgical, medical and obstetric services, expanded intensive care and coronary care, a 26-bed day surgery and endoscopic unit and a 24-bed paediatric unit, day oncology, renal dialysis, St John Ambulance depot, a medical centre, community health centre and hydrotherapy pool. The state government would spend $50 to $84 million on the expansion and would take 20 months. The state government would save the taxpayer $22 million over the contract period.

The new emergency department was opened on 4 June 1997 by Health Minister Kevin Prince. The emergency department was expanded from a 5-bed unit to a 17-bed unit. In July, the west wing with its eight new birthing suites opened and a renal dialysis unit would open, after a staffing delay, on 9 September 1997. A north wing and theatres will open later in the year. The rest of the planned upgrades were completed in early 1998. In January 1998, a new intensive and coronary care unit opened as did a 24-bed paediatric ward. In late January 1998, a new 26 bed restorative unit, a 25-bed mental health service and a hydrotherapy pool were opened. The Joondalup Health Campus would officially open on 11 March 1998 by Premier Richard Court.

In March 2003, Health Minister Bob Kucera announced that a $1.35 million Dental Clinic would be built at the Joondalup Health Campus. It would be a ten-chair clinic employing 24 staff members with construction starting in September 2003 and the completion date was March 2004. A new after-hours Clinic opened at the Joondalup Health Campus in September 2004. The aim was to relieve the emergency department from treating minor ailments.

On 9 November 2009, a sod-turning ceremony was held at the Joondalup Health Campus that would see $317 million spent on upgrading the facilities at the hospital and see its size doubled. Ramsay Health would provide $90 million to a new private hospital with the rest of the money provided by the state government. Public beds would be increased to 451 from 280 beds, increased emergency department, new operating theatres and a 20-bed dialysis ward. Work was expected to be completed by 2013.

Expansion continued and on 3 March 2011, a $29 million Emergency Department was opened with a total of 56 bays and separate areas for adults and children. A new public ward was opened worth $20.8 million and saw 55 new beds which included 51 single rooms, some with courtyards and two double bedrooms.

On the 8 March 2012, Health Minister Kim Hames opened a new theatre block which included 12 new operating theatres. Seven opened immediately and the rest opened September of that year. Other facilities opened included a nine-bed intensive care unit, a six-bed high dependency unit and a ten-bed coronary care unit. The $394 million expansion was funded by the State Government who contributed $230 million, Ramsay Health contributed $163 million while the Federal Government contributed $1.4 million.

On 6 June 2013, Health Minister Kim Hames opened the new private hospital at the Joondalup Health Campus. The development saw 145 new beds in the private wing and freed up 26 beds in the public wards.

In June 2016, a $12.1 million Telethon Children's Ward open that expanded the beds from 24 to 37 beds and includes a giant aquarium, interactive play floors and an outdoor play space for children. Contributions for the expansion came from the WA Government, Telethon and Ramsey Health Care.

During 2017, the JHC saw 100,000 people pass through the emergency department and the hospital saw 30,750 surgical procedures.

Joondalup Health Campus opened a $7.1 million Mental Health Observation Area, adjacent to the emergency department in February 2018. Partially funded by Ramsey Health Care, the ten-bed area is made up of 4 bedrooms, 6 patient bays, a lounge, secure courtyard and waiting area. It was built by ADCO, and construction had started in 2017.

In the 2018/19 state budget for Western Australia, the Joondalup Health Campus was allocated $158 million to add 8 new operating theatres, a 6-bed stroke unit, further expansion of the emergency department, additional 90 inpatient and 75 mental health beds, 3 new cardiac catheter laboratories, a 25-bed Coronary Care Unit, urgent care clinic and a "Medihotel". Health Minister Roger Cook said a "Medihotel", earmarked for the Joondalup Health Campus, aimed to assist regional patients to access to the hospital system.

In February 2026, Ramsay Healthcare completed the $166 million expansion of its private hospital on the health campus. In May 2026, after a contribution by the state government of $149.9 million and $158 million from the federal government, the public hospital saw a further 60 new medical and surgical beds open to the public on two floors of in a new six storey building, which has a further sixteen-bed cardiac care unit and a thirty-bed medical and surgical ward.

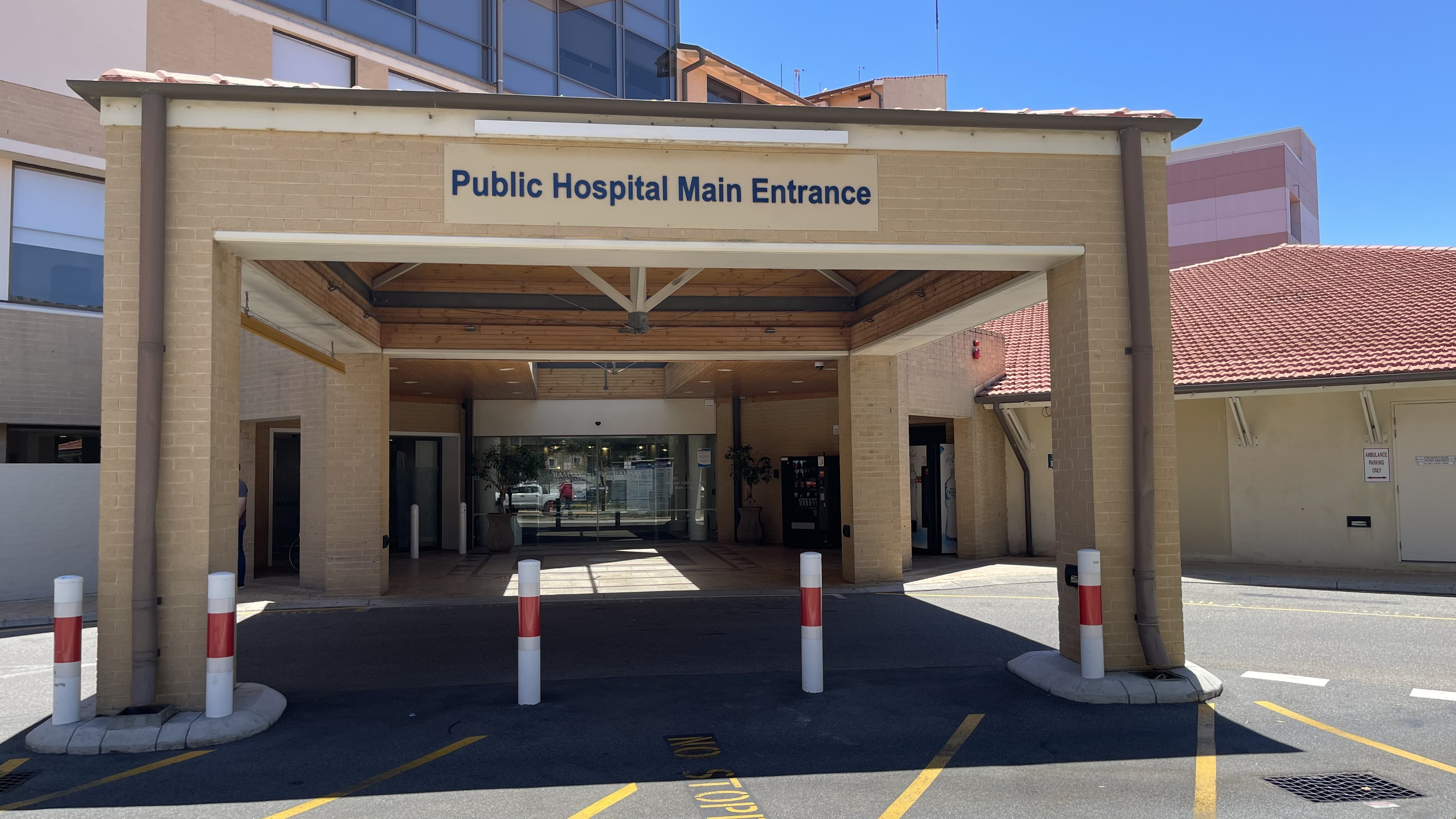
Main entrance to the Public Hospital

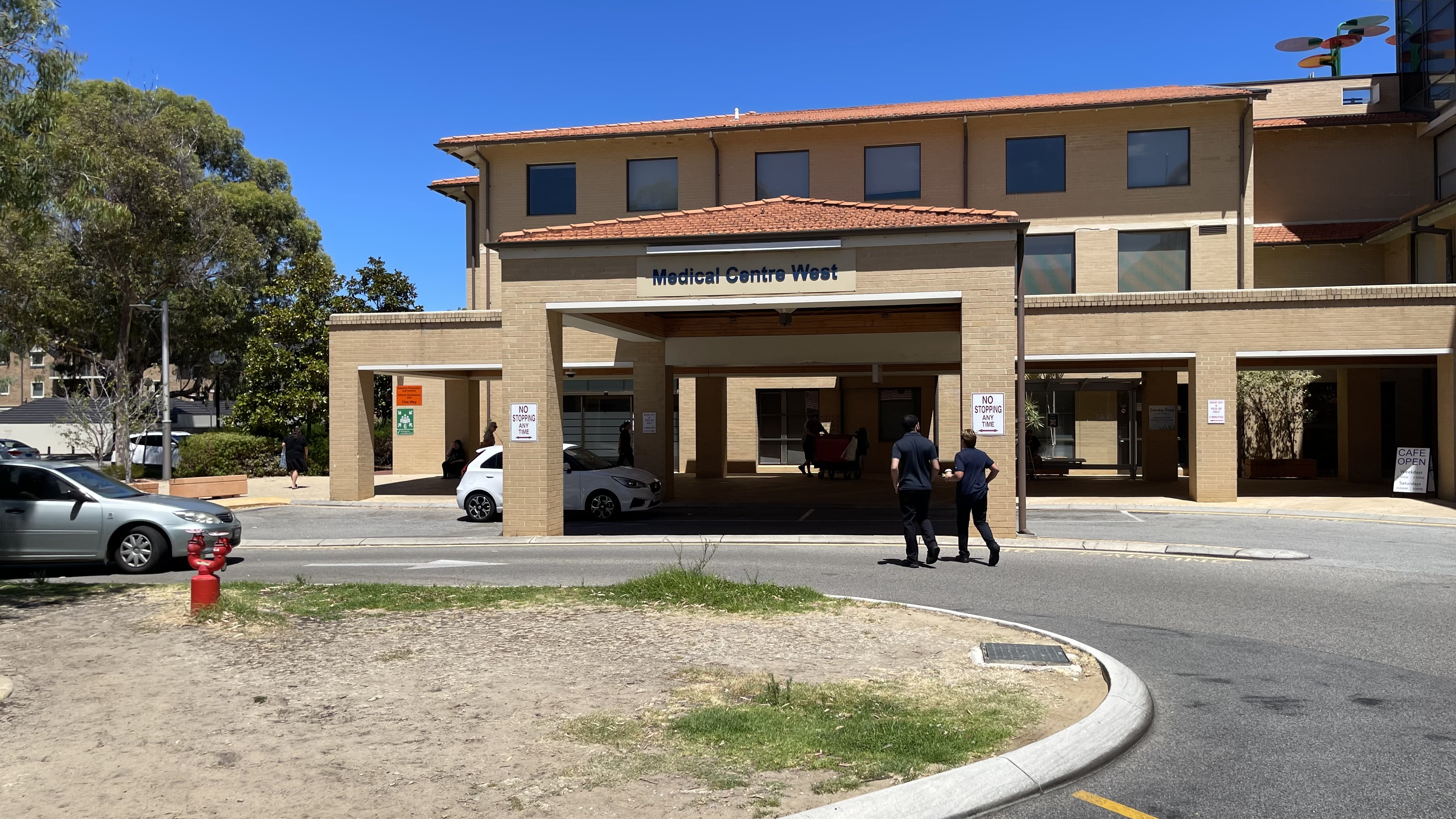
Entrance to Medical Centre West

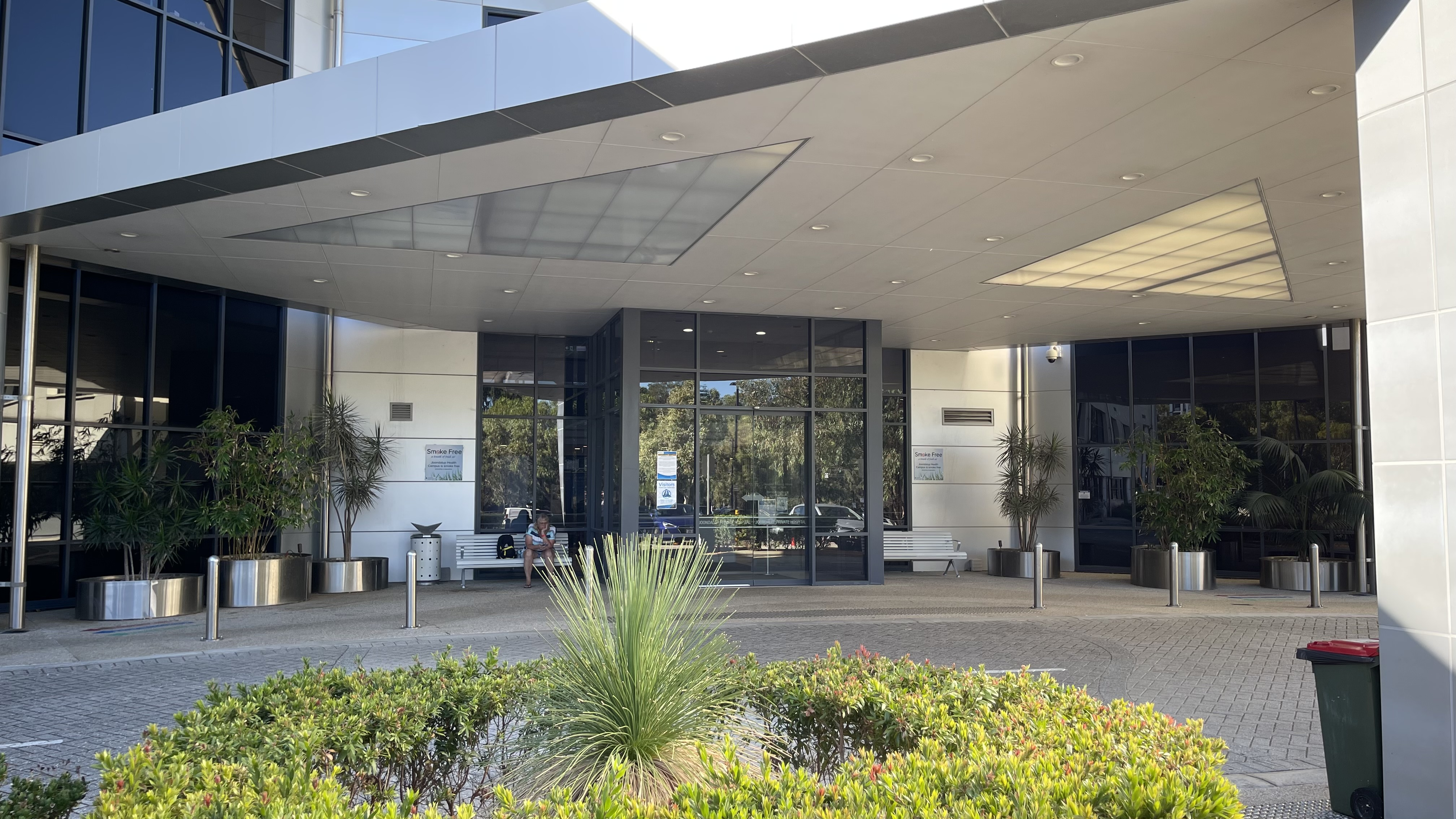
Entrance to the Private Hospital

== See also ==
- List of hospitals in Western Australia
