= Burns Beach, Western Australia =

Burns Beach
- Suburb
- Interactive map of Burns Beach
- Coordinates: 31.719°S 115.724°E
- Country: Australia
- State: Western Australia
- City: Perth
- LGA: City of Joondalup
- Location: 32 km (20 mi) NW of Perth central business district
- Established: 1920s

Government
  - State electorate: Burns Beach
  - Federal division: Moore

Area
  - Total: 3.3 km^{2} (1.3 sq mi)

Population
  - Total: 4,071 (SAL 2021)
- Postcode: 6028
Suburbs around Burns Beach
	Tamala Park	Tamala Park
Indian Ocean	Burns Beach	Kinross
	Iluka	Currambine

Burns Beach is a suburb of Perth, Western Australia, located 34 kilometres (21 mi) north of Perth's central business district at the northern fringe of the City of Joondalup. Burns Beach has maintained much of its original character as a small coastal village even with its loss of isolation, and the beach is popular among hang gliding enthusiasts.

== History ==
The land at Burns Beach was originally owned by the Midland Railway Company. In 1908, following a request from 50 local residents, the Wanneroo Road Board (which eventually became City of Wanneroo) successfully applied for a 20-hectare (49-acre) reserve for camping and a health resort. By the 1920s, the area was well used by locals, who knew the area as "Burns Beach" after a farmer who ran sheep in the area.

For many years it was accessible only by track or boat and functioned as a small coastal village, and tourism and fishing were the main occupations. After World War II, it was connected by road to Wanneroo Road.

The sprawl of housing development extending northwards from Perth reached Burns Beach in the early- to mid-1990s with the growth of Joondalup as a regional centre and the construction of the suburbs of Currambine and Kinross.

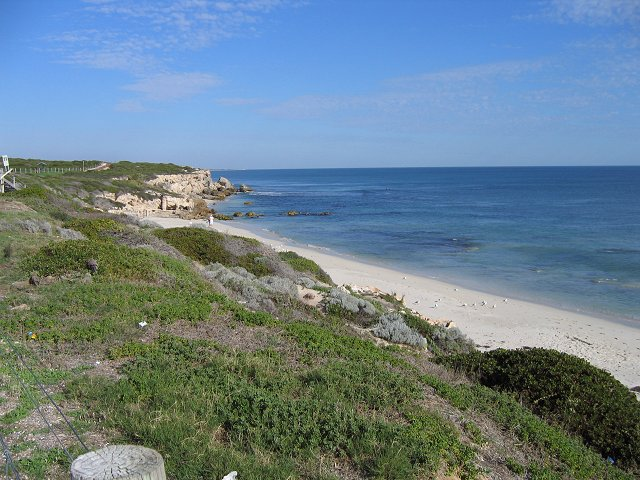
View of Indian Ocean - south towards Ocean Reef and Hillarys at Burns Beach. The coastal nature walk can be seen to the top left.

== Present day ==
Burns Beach has maintained much of its original character even with its loss of isolation, and the original caravan park is still in operation. Burns Beach marks one end of a coastal nature walk extending to Fremantle. The suburb also contains a cafe and restaurant with outdoor seating, as well as a picnic area with barbecues and toilets. Burn's Beach's ocean facing parking bays are a popular destination for residents seeking a pleasant spot to watch the sun set in the summer, or the waves pound through in winter.

== Geography ==
Burns Beach is bounded by the ocean to the west, Marmion Avenue to the east and Burns Beach Road to the south. Tamala Park, a bushland buffer to the north, separates Burns Beach and Kinross from the Mindarie-Clarkson urban region.

At the 2001 census, Burns Beach had a population of 225 people living in 90 dwellings, with a median age of 39 years (among the oldest in the northern suburbs). A caravan park at the end of Ocean Parade (technically in Iluka) houses another 90 residents. Residential styles in Burns Beach include a mix of holiday dwellings from before and after World War II.

== Education ==
A new Burns Beach primary School opened in February 2022. Other primary schools are at Beaumaris (Ocean Reef), Currambine and Kinross. Burns Beach falls within the Ocean Reef Senior High School and Clarkson Community High School catchment areas.

== Transport ==
Burns Beach is served by the 470 and 471 Transperth bus routes from Joondalup, which are operated by Swan Transit.

=== Bus ===
- 470 Burns Beach to Joondalup Station – serves Ocean Parade and Burns Beach Road
- 471 Burns Beach to Joondalup Station – serves Beachside Drive, Seabreeze Avenue, Grand Ocean Entrance and Marmion Avenue

== Politics ==
Burns Beach is a reasonably affluent suburb with a large elderly population. While this would normally point to a clear Liberal Party preference, fishermen and permanent residents of the caravan park who favour Labor comprise a fair proportion of those voting at Burns, making it a marginal booth with no clear preference at either federal or state elections. Nearby Kinross, an urban residential estate suburb similar to the proposed Burns Beach Estate, favours the Liberal Party although not as strongly as Currambine and Ocean Reef to the south.

2004 federal election Source: AEC
Liberal	55.7%
Labor	34.2%
Greens	5.21%
One Nation	3.26%
CDP	1.30%

2005 state election Source: WAEC
Labor	41.0%
Liberal	39.2%
Greens	8.68%
Family First	3.59%
CDP	2.99%

2001 federal election Source: AEC
Liberal	52.3%
Labor	36.2%
Greens	4.56%
One Nation	3.23%
Democrats	2.15%

2001 state election Source: WAEC
Labor	43.7%
Liberal	34.4%
One Nation	8.61%
Greens	6.62%
Independent	3.97%

1998 federal election
Labor	32.8%
Liberal	30.3%
Independent	27.7%
Greens	4.18%
One Nation	3.54%

1996 state election Source: WAEC
Liberal	47.5%
Labor	39.7%
Greens	7.09%
Democrats	5.67%

== See also ==
- Electoral district of Burns Beach
