= Ocean Reef, Western Australia =

Ocean Reef
- Suburb
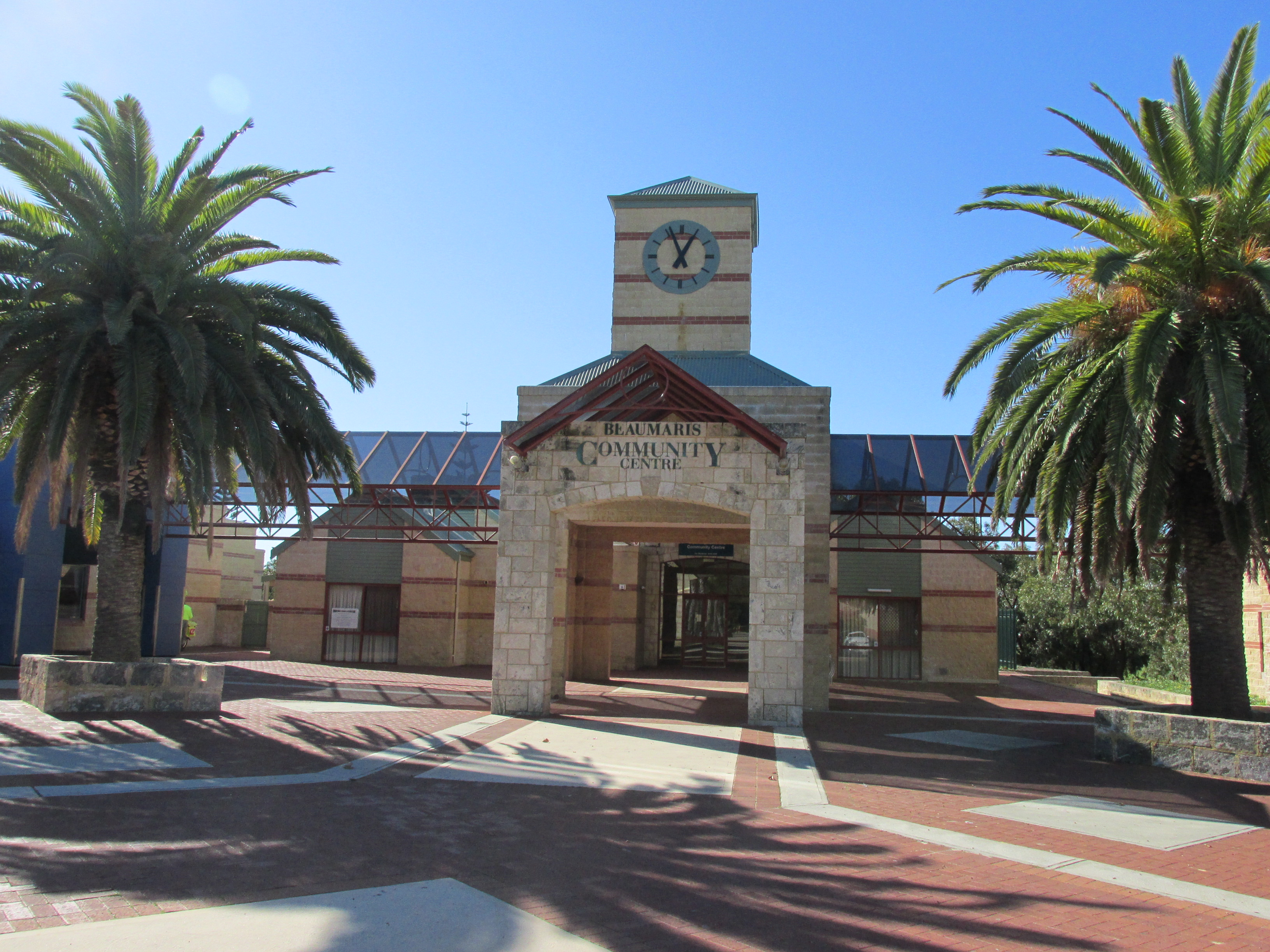
- Community centre in the Beaumaris estate, Ocean Reef
- Interactive map of Ocean Reef
- Coordinates: 31.752°S 115.735°E
- Country: Australia
- State: Western Australia
- City: Perth
- LGA: City of Joondalup
- Location: 28 km (17 mi) NNW of Perth

Government
  - State electorate: Joondalup
  - Federal division: Moore

Population
  - Total: 8,125 (SAL 2021)
- Postcode: 6027
Suburbs around Ocean Reef
	Iluka	Currambine
Indian Ocean	Ocean Reef	Connolly; Heathridge
	Mullaloo	Beldon

Ocean Reef is a suburb in northern Perth, Western Australia. It is located within the City of Joondalup. The name was coined by developer Kaiser Aetna Australia in the 1970s from the line of a reef visible several kilometres offshore. The name was formally adopted in 1974, replacing the prior name of Beaumaris, a name still retained by one of the shopping centres and one primary school.

The suburb is divided in two by Hodges Drive, with the development to the south often referred to as 'old' Ocean Reef (there are only a few years between the two). The boat harbour sits on this midway point at the western end of Hodges Drive, and there is a shopping centre in each end of the suburb - Beaumaris Shopping Centre in the north and Ocean Reef Shopping Centre to the south. Roadworks have recently been completed to extend the foreshore road from Hodges Drive (south) to Shenton Ave (north), extending the 'Sunset Coast' drive into the adjacent suburb of Iluka.

Located some 8 km (5.0 mi) north of the popular Hillarys Boat Harbour, the Ocean Reef Boat Harbour provides a public launching ramp for boats and a small fishing harbour. During recent years, the City of Joondalup has prepared concept plans for the development of a world class recreational/residential boating, and tourism marina at the Ocean Reef Boat Harbour site (Ocean Reef Marina). The proposed development encapsulates high levels of environmental sustainability and community amenity. In 2009 the City of Joondalup asked the people of Ocean Reef and the surrounding suburbs what they thought of the proposed development. Out of a total of 11,728 survey respondents, an overwhelming majority - 93.9% - were in favour of developing the site and 95.6% approved of the concept plan. The Council has endorsed proceeding with the preparation of the necessary Business Case and Structure Plan for government approval.

Ocean Reef is served by three primary schools (Beaumaris Primary, St Simon Peter Catholic Primary, and Ocean Reef Primary).

A dune walkway and cycle path hugs the coast from south to north, offering access to several small beaches, picnic areas, rest stops, and access paths into the suburb itself. A large protected dune area which is at times around 400 metres (1,300 ft) wide separates the houses from the Indian Ocean.

== Demographics ==
In the 2016 census, Ocean Reef had a population of 7,840; 50% male and 50% female. The median age of Ocean Reef residents was 42, and median weekly personal income was $760. Aboriginal and/or Torres Strait Islander people made up 0.6% of the population.

The most popular religious affiliations in descending order in the 2016 census were No Religion 29.9%, Catholic 26.7%, Anglican 18.9%, Not Stated 7.4% and Christian, nfd 2.6%. Christianity was the largest religious group reported overall (63.6%) (this figure excludes not stated responses).

== Senior and tertiary education ==
Ocean Reef contains three Primary Schools:

- Ocean Reef Primary School (public)
- Beaumaris Primary School (public)
- Saint Simon Peter Catholic Primary School (private)

Ocean Reef also contains two high schools:

- Ocean Reef Senior High School (public)
- Prendiville Catholic College (private)

== Notable residents ==
- Virginia Giuffre
