= Iluka, Western Australia =

Iluka Perth, Western Australia
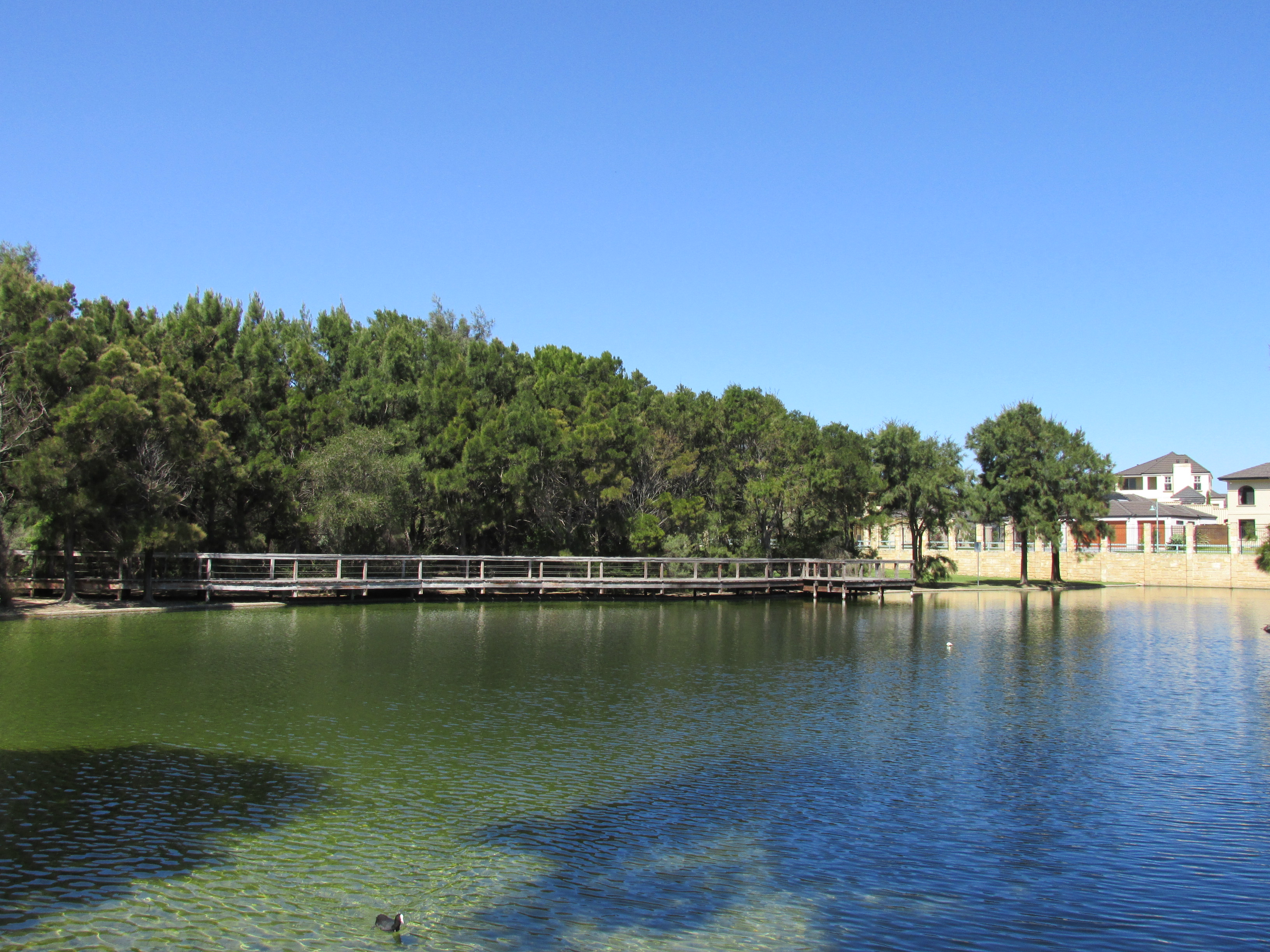
- Lake at James McCusker Park, Iluka
- Coordinates: 31.736°S 115.726°E
- Population: 5,669 (SAL 2021)
- Established: 1990s
- Postcode(s): 6028
- Area: 2.5 km^{2} (1.0 sq mi)
- Location: 32 km (20 mi) from Perth
- LGA(s): City of Joondalup
- State electorate(s): Joondalup
- Federal division(s): Moore
Suburbs around Iluka:
	Burns Beach	Kinross
Indian Ocean	Iluka	Currambine
	Ocean Reef	Connolly

Iluka is a beachside suburb of Perth, Western Australia. It is located within the City of Joondalup to the north of Perth.

Iluka offers Beaumaris Beach (complete with lunch shelters, barbecues and toilets) as well as a large sporting facility; Iluka Sports Complex (Beaumaris Sports Association), the home of Joondalup City Football Club, Joondalup Bowling Club, Joondalup District Cricket Club, Joondalup Lakers Hockey Club and Iluka Underground street roller hockey club, and the RugbyWA Joondalup Brothers Rugby Union Football Club.

Popular surfing spots in the region include Mullaloo Beach, Sorrento Beach and Hillarys Beach.
