= List of heritage places in the City of Joondalup =

List of heritage sites in Western Australia

As of 2026, 50 places are heritage-listed in the City of Joondalup, of which one is on the State Register of Heritage Places, the Luisini Winery. The State Register of Heritage Places is maintained by the Heritage Council of Western Australia.

== List ==
=== State Register of Heritage Places ===
The Western Australian State Register of Heritage Places, as of 2026, lists the following state registered place within the City of Joondalup:

| Place name | Place # | Street name | Suburb or town | Co-ordinates | Built | State registered | Notes & former names | Photo |
|---|---|---|---|---|---|---|---|---|
| Luisini Winery Group | 2676 | 10 Lakeway Drive | Kingsley | 31.805174°S 115.815586°E | 1929 | 16 March 2001 | | |

=== City of Joondalup heritage-listed places ===
The following places are heritage listed in the City of Joondalup but are not State registered:

| Place name | Place # | Street # | Street name | Suburb or town | Notes & former names | Photo |
|---|---|---|---|---|---|---|
| Bishops House, Marmion | 3851 | 10 | West Coast Highway | Marmion | | |
| Hepburn Heights | 4522 | Abutting | Hepburn Avenue | Padbury | | |
| Burial Site | 8898 | 55 | Joondalup Drive | Joondalup | | |
| Yellagonga Regional Park Precinct | 9485 | | Yellagonga Regional Park | Wanneroo | | |
| Lake Joondalup Reserve Yellagonga Regional Park | 9486 | | Yellagonga Regional Park | Joondalup | | |
| Shepherds Bush Reserve | 9487 | | E Barridale Driveive & Shepherds Bush Reserve | Kingsley | | |
| Neil Hawkins Park | 9489 | | Boas Avenue, Yellagonga Reg Park | Joondalup | | |
| Duffy House, Woodvale | 9496 | 108 | Duffy Terrace | Woodvale | Frederick Duffy House, Jack Duffy House | |
| Pinaroo Valley Memorial Park Cemetery | 9497 | Bounded by | Mitchell Freeway & Whitfords Avenue | Padbury | | |
| Charles Pearsall's House | 9513 | 67 | Woodvale Drive | Woodvale | | |
| St Nicholas Church & Rectory | 11500 | 3-5 | Poynter Drive | Duncraig | | |
| St John The Evangelist Church & Rectory | 11515 | 15-17 | Calectasia Street | Greenwood | | |
| Rectory | 11521 | 8 | Idyll Court | Heathridge | | |
| St Mary Magdalene Church | 11522 | Corner | Lysander & Caridean Streets | Heathridge | | |
| Bishops House, Hillarys | 11525 | 14 | Heatherton Mews | Hillarys | | |
| Resurrection Church Centre & Rectory | 11539 | Corner | Aristride & Dampier Streets | Kallaroo | | |
| St Anselm of Canterbury | 11548 | 21 | Forest Hill Drive | Kingsley | | |
| St Luke's Church | 11599 | 10 | Alexander Drive | Padbury | | |
| Anglican Rectory | 11600 | 13 | Jason Place | Padbury | | |
| Rectory | 11621 | 68 | Justin Drive | Sorrento | | |
| Woodvale Memorial Tree Planting | 14276 | | Castlegate Way, Yellagonga Regional Park | Woodvale | | |
| Wanneroo Research Station | 14279 | | Yellagonga Regional Park | Joondalup | | |
| Ted Gibbs House | 14292 | 580 | Joondalup Drive | Joondalup | | |
| Beldon-Iluka Uniting Church | 15250 | 9 | Pacific Way | Beldon | | |
| Manse | 15251 | 11 | Baltusrol Rise | Connolly | | |
| Uniting Church Manse | 15252 | 34 | Roche Road | Duncraig | | |
| Duncraig Uniting Church | 15253 | 29 | Wandoo Road | Duncraig | | |
| Greenwood Uniting Church & Hall | 15255 | 89 | Marlock Drive | Greenwood | | |
| Uniting Church Manse | 15256 | 8 | Mabley Court | Greenwood | | |
| Community Housing | 15257 | 3 | Birdland Court | Edgewater | | |
| Manse | 15258 | 5 | Tallow Rmble | Edgewater | | |
| Geneff Park | 16582 | | Padbury Circle | Sorrento | Padbury Reserve, Marmion's Chimney | |
| Warwick Police Station & Licence Centre | 17369 | 37 | Eddington Street | Warwick | | |
| Joondalup Police Complex | 17396 | 9 | Reid Promenade | Joondalup | | |
| Hillarys Police Station | 17404 | 114 | Flinders Avenue | Hillarys | | |
| Marmion Marine Park | 18686 | | West Coast Drive | Hillarys | | |
| North West Stock Route | 25092 | | | Star Swamp to Walkaway | Old North Stock Route, Old North Road, Champion Bay Stock Route | |
| Rock Inscription, Ocean Reef Beach | 25302 | | Resolution Way | Ocean Reef | | |
| Hawks Hill Gallery (former), Kingsley | 25898 | 58 | Goollelal Drive | Kingsley | | |
| Galaxy Drive-In Cinema, Kingsley | 26079 | 159 | Goollelal Drive | Kingsley | | |
| Tom Simpson Park, Mullaloo | 27338 | 19 | Oceanside Promenade | Mullaloo | | |
| Duncraig Leisure Centre | 27339 | 40 | Warwick Road | Duncraig | Sorrento Duncraig Recreation Centre | |
| Ken Colbung Statue, Duncraig | 27340 | 40 | Warwick Road | Duncraig | | |
| Pinnaroo Point, Hillarys | 27341 | 239 | Whitfords Avenue | Hillarys | Bush Forever Area 325, Mullaloo Point | |
| Kingsley Montessori School | 27342 | 18 | Montessori Place | Kingsley | Children's House | |
| The Little Pinnacles, Mullaloo | 27343 | 131 | Oceanside Promenade | Mullaloo | Bush Forever Area 325, The Little Desert | |
| Tom's Rock, Ocean Reef | 27344 | 450L | Ocean Reef Road | Ocean Reef | | |
| Geneff Park | 27345 | 22 | Padbury Circle | Sorrento | Whaling Station (site of), Marmion's Chimney, Sorrento Community Hall | |
| Gibbs House (demolished), Joondalup | 27358 | 580 | Joondalup Drive | Joondalup | | |
