= Woodvale Secondary College =

School in Perth, Western Australia

Location
- 110 Woodvale Drive; Woodvale, Western Australia; Australia; 31°47′28″S 115°47′58″E

Information
- Former name: Woodvale Senior High School
- Type: Independent public co-educational partially academically-selective high day school
- Motto: Your life, your goals, our world
- Established: 1985; 41 years ago
- Sister school: Aboshi High School, Japan; Jinan Middle School, China
- School district: North Metro
- Educational authority: WA Department of Education
- Principal: Lea Fairfoul-Hutcheon
- Teaching staff: 83.0 (on an FTE basis)
- Employees: 30.6 non-teaching staff (on an FTE basis)
- Years: 7–12
- Enrolment: 1,341 (2023)
- Language: English
- Campus type: Suburban
- Colours: Ultraviolet, olive green, magenta
- Sports: Basketball; Football
- Team name: Woodvale Specialist Basketball; Woodvale Specialist Football
- Website: www.woodvale.wa.edu.au

Woodvale Secondary College, formerly Woodvale Senior High School, is an independent public school, located in Woodvale, a suburb 20 kilometres (12 mi) north of Perth, Western Australia. Opened in 1985, the school's catchment area covers parts of the City of Joondalup and the adjacent eastern portion of the City of Wanneroo. The school has an enrolment of 1,409 students from Year 7 to Year 12.

The school encompasses the middle socio-economic range suburbs of Kingsley and Woodvale and is defined by the boundaries formed by Wanneroo Road and the Mitchell Freeway in an east–west alignment and Ocean Reef Road to the north. The south border is in line with the cycle path to the Mitchell Freeway entrance in Kingsley.

The school provides specialist academic programs in basketball, football, and music.

== History ==
The college, whose namesake is its location of Woodvale, opened in 1985 for 200 Year 8 students, and expanded its age range yearly until 1990 when its first class of Year 12 students commenced.

In 2012, Woodvale Senior High School became an Independent Public School and a School Board was established. With much deliberation from the school and its community, the school was renamed Woodvale Secondary College. Along with the change was a minor change in the school emblem as well as the replacement of their motto ‘Grow to wisdom’ with ‘Your life, your goals, our world’. A large plaque with the former emblem and motto is on display in the school's gardens.

In 2014, the school underwent major upgrades, including a new administration office, a "Hospitality & Function centre" for curricular activities for students studying hospitality, and a "Sports centre" gymnasium for physical education and specialist basketball and football programs. The former two were officially opened by local member of parliament Luke Simpkins, on 15 August 2014.

== Specialist programs ==
Woodvale Secondary College currently offers specialist programs in basketball, football, and music.

Woodvale also offers placement to top-performing students from years 8 to 10 in the Academic Extension Program (AEP) across all core subjects (English, Mathematics, Humanities & Social Sciences, Science, and Languages)

== Facilities ==
The campus wide Information Technology Network provides a wide range of digital media capabilities and professional level software. The trade training centre provides practical activities for students studying hospitality and subjects alike, such as home economics. The sports centre provides for physical education and specialist basketball and football programs. The iCentre (formerly Learning Resource Centre) is a student hub used for independent studying and socialising before school, during recess and lunch, and after school.

Local council-owned Tennis Courts adjacent to the campus are used for lower school physical education classes in tennis.

== Achievements ==
Academically, students perform at a level above the state average. The Academic Extension Programme receives good community support, the Music Program sees 20% of the student population participating in an instrumental program (with over 60% prematurely studying an instrument in primary school), and the school each year presents several students who achieve well in the WACE examinations. Between 2016 and 2018 the graduating cohort had an 80+ ATAR average.

Woodvale performed above the national average in the 2018 NAPLAN Testing.

In 2014, Woodvale was rated among the top 50 secondary schools in Perth.

== Catchment area ==
Woodvale's catchment area has been specified by the Department of Education to include the suburbs of Kingsley and Woodvale, and parts of its surrounding suburbs. Nearby primary schools are Woodvale, North Woodvale, Halidon, and Creaney.

Its neighbour high schools are Ocean Reef Senior High School to the north-west, Greenwood College to the south, and Duncraig Senior High School to the-south-west.

== House system ==
Woodvale's house system consists of four houses, named after constellations (Centaurus, Orion, Pegasus, Phoenix), with students generally organised into their houses by the first letter of their surname. The house system forms the basis of sporting competitions within the school. Sporting events, such as the house sports carnival or the swimming carnival, are isolated to each year group.

== See also ==
- List of schools in the Perth metropolitan area
