= Darch, Western Australia =

Darch
- Suburb
- Interactive map of Darch
- Coordinates: 31.812°S 115.846°E
- Country: Australia
- State: Western Australia
- City: Perth
- LGA: City of Wanneroo
- Location: 17 km (11 mi) N of the Perth CBD

Government
  - State electorate: Landsdale
  - Federal division: Pearce

Area
  - Total: 3.1 km^{2} (1.2 sq mi)

Population
  - Total: 7,347 (SAL 2021)
- Postcode: 6065
Suburbs around Darch
Wangara	Landsdale	Landsdale
Madeley	Darch	Landsdale
Marangaroo	Marangaroo	Alexander Heights

Darch is a suburb of Perth, Western Australia, located within the City of Wanneroo approximately 17 kilometres (11 mi) north of the central business district. Previously part of Landsdale, much of the suburb was rural in character until the late 1990s. It was named after an early settler family in the area, with the name being approved in 1997. The area was subsequently opened to residential development, especially from 2001 onwards, as part of Cell 6 of the East Wanneroo Development Area.

== Schools ==
Darch contains three schools, – Ashdale Primary School, opened in 2005 with 243 pre-school and 596 primary students as of Semester 2, 2008; Kingsway Christian College, a non-denominational Christian school founded in 1983, initially known as Northern Districts Christian College; and Ashdale Secondary College, which opened in 2009 for the suburb's high school students, and is located on Westport Parade across from Ashdale Primary School and close to Kingsway Christian College.

The suburb contains several small residential parks as well as Landsdale Park, a bushland reserve with interpretative signage. Residents are served for shopping needs by the Darch Plaza shopping centre, and the larger Kingsway City Shopping Centre to the west.

== Transport ==
The suburb is serviced by two Transperth bus routes, all operated by Swan Transit. The route 450, running along Kingsway, links to Warwick railway station; whilst the 374 route, which enters the suburb and serves the central section, travel via Evandale Road, links to Mirrabooka bus station and Whitfords railway station. All termini offer services to central Perth.

=== Bus ===
- 374 Whitfords Station to Mirrabooka Bus Station – serves Westport Parade, Ashdale Boulevard and Evandale Road
- 386 Kingsway City to Perth Busport – serves Hepburn Avenue
- 386X Kingsway City to Perth Busport (limited stops) – serves Hepburn Avenue
- 450 Warwick Station to Ballajura Station – serves Kingsway
- 970 Landsdale to Perth Busport (high frequency) – serves Mirrabooka Avenue
- 970X Landsdale to Perth Busport (high frequency / limited stops) – serves Mirrabooka Avenue
