= Ashdale Secondary College =

School in Perth, Western Australia

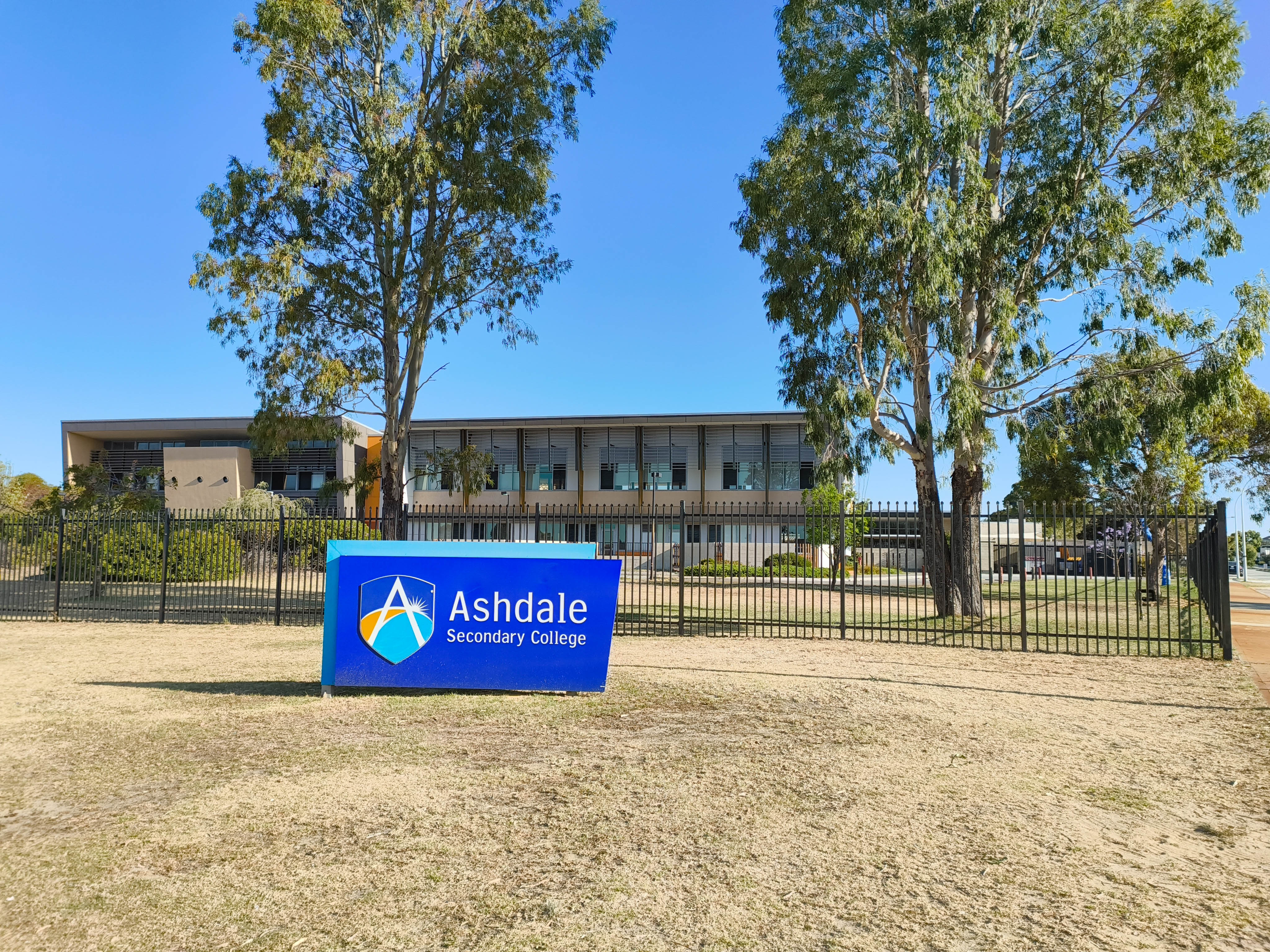

Location
- 75 Westport Parade; Darch, Western Australia; Australia; 31°48′40″S 115°50′28″E

Information
- Type: Independent public co-educational specialist high day school
- Motto: Achieving a Positive Future
- Opened: 2009; 17 years ago
- Educational authority: WA Department of Education
- Specialist: Information and Communication Technology (ICT); Autism Extension (AEP)
- Principal: Jacquie Bogunovich
- Years: 7–12
- Enrolment: 1,781 (2021)
- Campus type: Suburban
- Colours: Blue and yellow
- Website: www.ashdalesc.wa.edu.au

Ashdale Secondary College is an Independent Public secondary school in the Perth suburb of Darch, Western Australia. Established in 2009, the school has programs for Information and Communication Technology (ICT) and for Autism Extension (AEP).

== History ==
Because of the subdivision of the suburbs of Landsdale, Darch and Madeley, there was a need for a new school in the area. The school was originally known as Landsdale Secondary College, but the name was changed because of the changing nature of the Darch subdivision.

Ashdale Secondary College opened in 2009 with an intake of 140 year 8 students. Stage one of the building program was completed in October 2009, stage 2 in late 2011 and stage 3 at the end of 2014 to accommodate the new year 7s. In 2009, the school was one of the first in Western Australia to become an independent public school.

In November 2021, Ashdale Secondary College was awarded the Meritorious Leadership Award, for finishing second in the Governor's School STEM Awards. The school was awarded WA Secondary School of the Year in later that month by the Department of Education.

== Programs ==
=== ICT Specialist Program ===
Ashdale Secondary College has an Information and Communication Technology (ICT) program. Students in year 7 and 8 can also go through the STEM institute, the ICT program and the digital technology courses. In year 9 to 12 can follow two different pathways. A digital design and communication pathway, which focuses on photography and graphic design, such as logos, branding and artwork, and a software design and computer science pathway, which focuses on software and video game design.

=== Specialised Autism Learning Program ===
The Specialised Autism Learning Program (SALP) is one of four programs in Western Australia that is set up by the Department of Education's Centre for Inclusive Schooling. The program is for students with autism spectrum disorder. There are autism specialist teachers and education assistants available, and a homeroom where students can organise themselves for the school day, unwind to reduce anxiety, study during study periods and use as a safe space during recess and lunch. There are two programs offered within the Autism Extension Program. The Very Important Life Skills program (VILS), which includes talk sessions where they talk about things such as social thinking, making friends and expected and unexpected behaviours. The second program is the Community Access program, where students go on a weekly outing to local shops, and go on two excursions per term.

== Controversy ==
In October of 2026, a male teacher was accused of allegedly sexually penetrating a child over 16 under his authority. According to these allegations, the assault took place between May and August 2025. Before his arrest, the teacher had previously won awards for his performance as the head of the school's STEM department.

== Academic results ==
Year	Rank	Median ATAR	Eligible students	Students with ATAR	% Students with ATAR	Ref
2021	—N/a	81.45	238	79	33.19%	
2020	75	78.65	218	84	38.53%	
2019	64	78.90	248	85	34.27%	
2018	67	79.95	241	76	31.54%	
2017	56	80.65	205	76	37.07%	
2016	106	71.85	207	87	42.03%	

== Student numbers ==
Year	Number
2009	143
2010	279
2011	492
2012	731
2013	945
2014	1,059
2015	1,425
2016	1,483
2017	1,536
2018	1,597
2019	1,680
2020	1,730

== See also ==
- List of schools in the Perth metropolitan area
