= Beldon, Western Australia =

Beldon
- Suburb
- Interactive map of Beldon
- Coordinates: 31.774°S 115.768°E
- Country: Australia
- State: Western Australia
- City: Perth
- LGA: City of Joondalup
- Location: 25 km (16 mi) NNW of Perth
- Established: 1975

Government
  - State electorate: Hillarys
  - Federal division: Moore

Area
  - Total: 2.2 km^{2} (0.85 sq mi)

Population
  - Total: 4,094 (SAL 2021)
- Postcode: 6027
Suburbs around Beldon
Ocean Reef	Heathridge	Edgewater
Mullaloo	Beldon	Woodvale
Kallaroo	Craigie	Woodvale

Beldon is a small suburb of Perth, Western Australia, located within the City of Joondalup, to the north of Craigie.

== Etymology ==
There are two possible origins for naming the suburb Beldon. The first possible origin is that it is named after A.W. Beldon who was an early landowner and surveyor of the Wanneroo area, active around 1838. The second possibility is that it is named after Arthur and Florence Beldon who ran Wanneroo School from 1945 until 1965.

== History ==
Prior to white settlement in Western Australia, the land was inhabited by the Nyoongar aboriginal people for 40,000 years and who had crisscrossed the area from inland to the coast during various times of the year.

When the suburb was proposed in 1974, Albert Grove was suggested as a name after one of the co-developers Jennings Industries which was owned by Sir Albert V Jennings. But an objection was raised that the name would be confused with the suburb of Alfred Cove, so another suggestion was put forward. Beldon's name was approved on 25 August 1975. House and land packages were first advertised in 1977 with the area known until 1979 as Mullaloo-Beldon or Ocean Reef-Beldon. The first show-houses were built along Craigie Drive and the area was marketed to young families, couples and migrants.

== Economy ==
=== Retail ===
The suburb has two main shopping precincts. The Belridge City shopping centre is located in the northern part of the suburb. Beldon Shopping Centre is located to the western side and is the original shopping centre in the suburb having opened on 5 December 1977 as Mullaloo Woolworths. In 1991, Belridge Professional Centre was opened and currently has chiropractic, medical, physiotherapy and veterinary facilities. The Belridge shopping centre opened in July 1994.

== Governance ==
The suburb of Beldon falls under the local government of the City of Joondalup and is represented by two councillors from the Central Ward. The current councillors are Rebecca Pizzey and Christopher May. At state parliament level, Beldon is represented in the Western Australian Legislative Assembly by a member from Hillarys electoral district. The current member is Caitlin Collins. In the Australian federal parliament, the suburb is part of the Division of Moore and is currently represented by Labor member, Tom French.

== Amenities ==
=== Parks ===
Beldon also contains several parks, with most of them containing play equipment for children. Beldon Park, the main park has a multi-purpose sports field and children's play equipment. Haddington Park, that features a dirt bike track. And two smaller parks, Gradient Park and Sandalford Park.

== Infrastructure ==
=== Transport ===
==== Bus ====
The suburb is served by the 463 Transperth bus route, as well as two others, the 462 and 464, that all start and end at the Joondalup and Whitfords railway stations.

- 462 Whitfords Station to Joondalup Station – serves Marmion Avenue
- 463 Whitfords Station to Joondalup Station – serves Craigie Drive, Gradient Way and Gwendoline Drive
- 464 Whitfords Station to Joondalup Station – serves Craigie Drive and Ocean Reef Road

==== Rail ====
Though not directly served, the nearest train station is Edgewater railway station which is part of the Yanchep line.

==== Roads ====
Beldon is located in between two major north–south arteries, Marmion Avenue to the west and the Mitchell Freeway to the east. Adjacent to the north is Ocean Reef Road which connects Beldon to the beach in the west (about 3 km) and inland parts, such as the Swan Valley.

== Education ==
=== Schools ===
The suburb hosts two schools. Beldon Primary School which opened in 1985 and Belridge Senior High School which opened in 1991 and was fully established in 1995.
