= Kingsley, Western Australia =

Kingsley
- Suburb
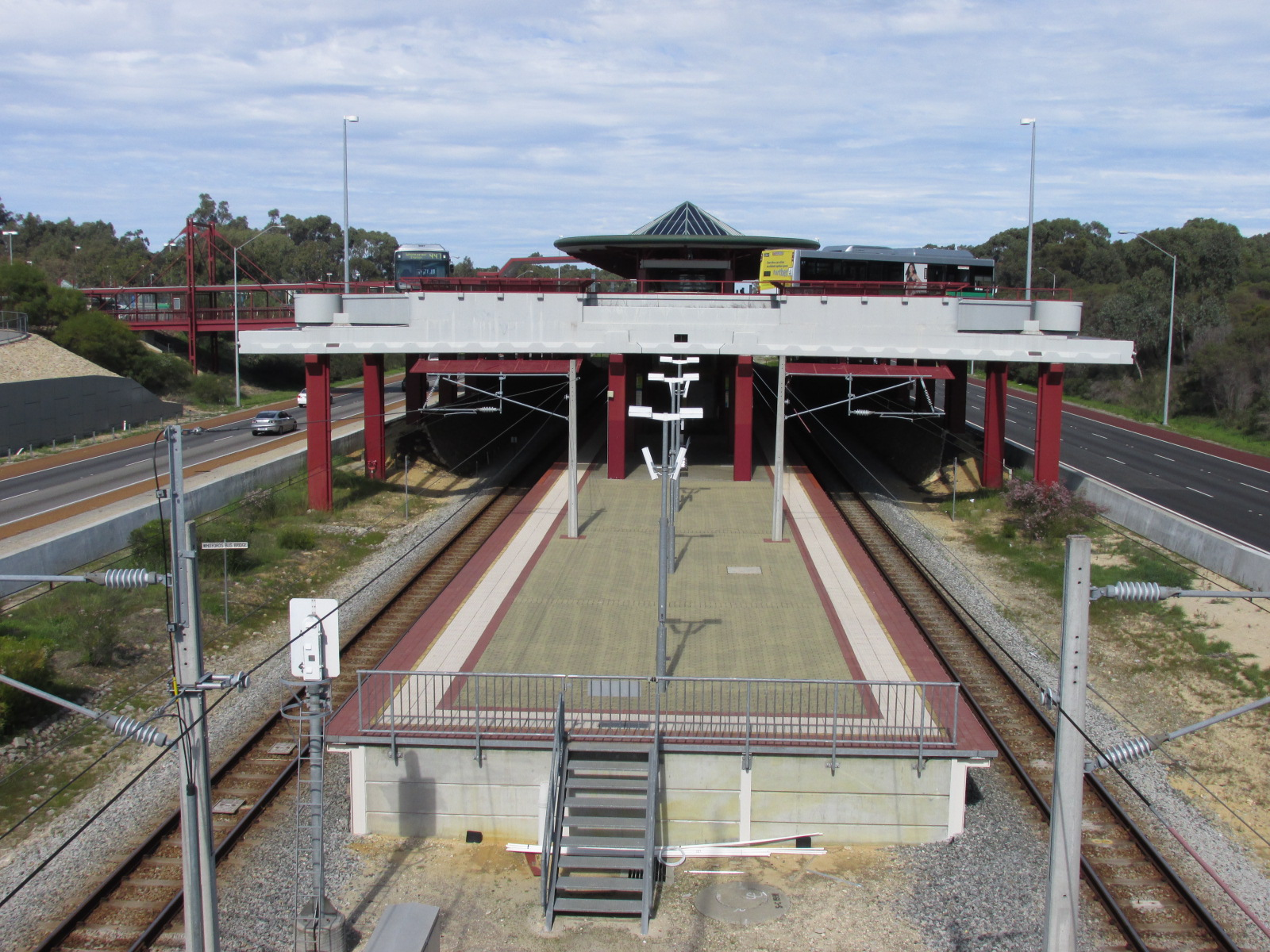
- Whitfords railway station, Kingsley
- Interactive map of Kingsley
- Coordinates: 31°48′38″S 115°47′56″E
- Country: Australia
- State: Western Australia
- City: Perth
- LGA: City of Joondalup
- Location: 20 km (12 mi) from Perth
- Established: 1977

Government
  - State electorate: Kingsley
  - Federal division: Moore Cowan

Area
  - Total: 7.5 km^{2} (2.9 sq mi)

Population
  - Total: 13,204 (SAL 2021)
- Postcode: 6026
Suburbs around Kingsley
Craigie	Woodvale	Wangara
Padbury	Kingsley	Madeley
Duncraig	Greenwood	Marangaroo

Kingsley is a suburb of Perth, Western Australia, located within the City of Joondalup. Kingsley is bounded to the north by Whitfords Avenue, to the south by Hepburn Avenue, to the west by the Mitchell Freeway and to the east by Wanneroo Road.

Lake Goollelal is located in the eastern part of Kingsley and runs parallel to Wanneroo Road. The residential area of Kingsley is divided by the lake, with a small enclave between the lake and Wanneroo Road.

== History ==
The suburb of Kingsley is named after the village of Kingsley which is near Winchester in Hampshire, England. The name was chosen for the historical association with the first owner of land in the area, William Kernot Shenton. Shenton was born in Winchester in 1802, and arrived in Western Australia in 1829. The suburb name was approved in 1974. In 1844 Methodist missionary Rev John Smithes established Mission Farm near Lake Goollelal. It was to be a farm to be worked and occupied by aboriginal people under the guidance of the church. Businessman Ezio Luisini purchased 20 acres (8.1 hectares) of land near Lake Goollelal on which he established a winery in 1924. It was once one of the largest wineries in the southern hemisphere and operated from 1929 until 1986 when it was closed and the land redeveloped into suburban lots by Ernie Mondello.

== Sport ==
Kingsley is the home of Kingsley Football club, which includes a Junior club. The Kingsley Football club had a number of members killed in the 2002 Bali bombings, a memorial was held at Kingsley Oval. The Kingsley-Woodvale Junior and Senior Cricket Clubs can also be found here. Kingsley has a tennis club, which was originally based in Kingsley, however it relocated to the neighbouring suburb of Woodvale in 1987 due to a lack of courts. Kingsley also have a soccer (football) team named Kingsley Soccer Club that are based in Woodvale at Chichester Park on Trappers Drive. The club became incorporated in 1990 and celebrated their 25th anniversary in 2015. They currently have five teams competing in the Football West competitions. They have teams based at the highest level of the Sunday league competing in the Sunday premier league first team and reserve competitions. They also have a third men's team competing in the division one metropolitan league after advancing from the division three metropolitan league over the past three years. The club also has a women's team and a vets team competing in the Bankwest women's metropolitan league and Mysolar masters league.

== Education ==
There are five primary schools located within Kingsley;

- Creaney Primary School,
- Dalmain Primary school,
- Halidon Primary School,
- Goollelal Primary School,
- The Montessori School Kingsley – this school is also a secondary school

== Religion ==
There are four churches in Kingsley:

- Kingsley Baptist
- Kingsley Church of Christ
- Kingsley Presbyterian Church
- Kingsley North-Woodvale Saint Anselm of Canterbury, Anglican

== Transport ==
Transperth operates bus routes 445, 446, 447 through Kingsley running in both directions between Warwick and Whitfords railway stations. Additionally routes 374, 452, 455, and 465–468 buses travel along Kingsley's northern boundary, Whitfords Avenue, whilst routes 389 and 450 along Wanneroo Road services the small residential strip east of Lake Goollelal. Train stations are located at both the south-western (Greenwood) and north-western (Whitfords) corners of Kingsley.
