= Madeley, Western Australia =

Madeley
- Suburb
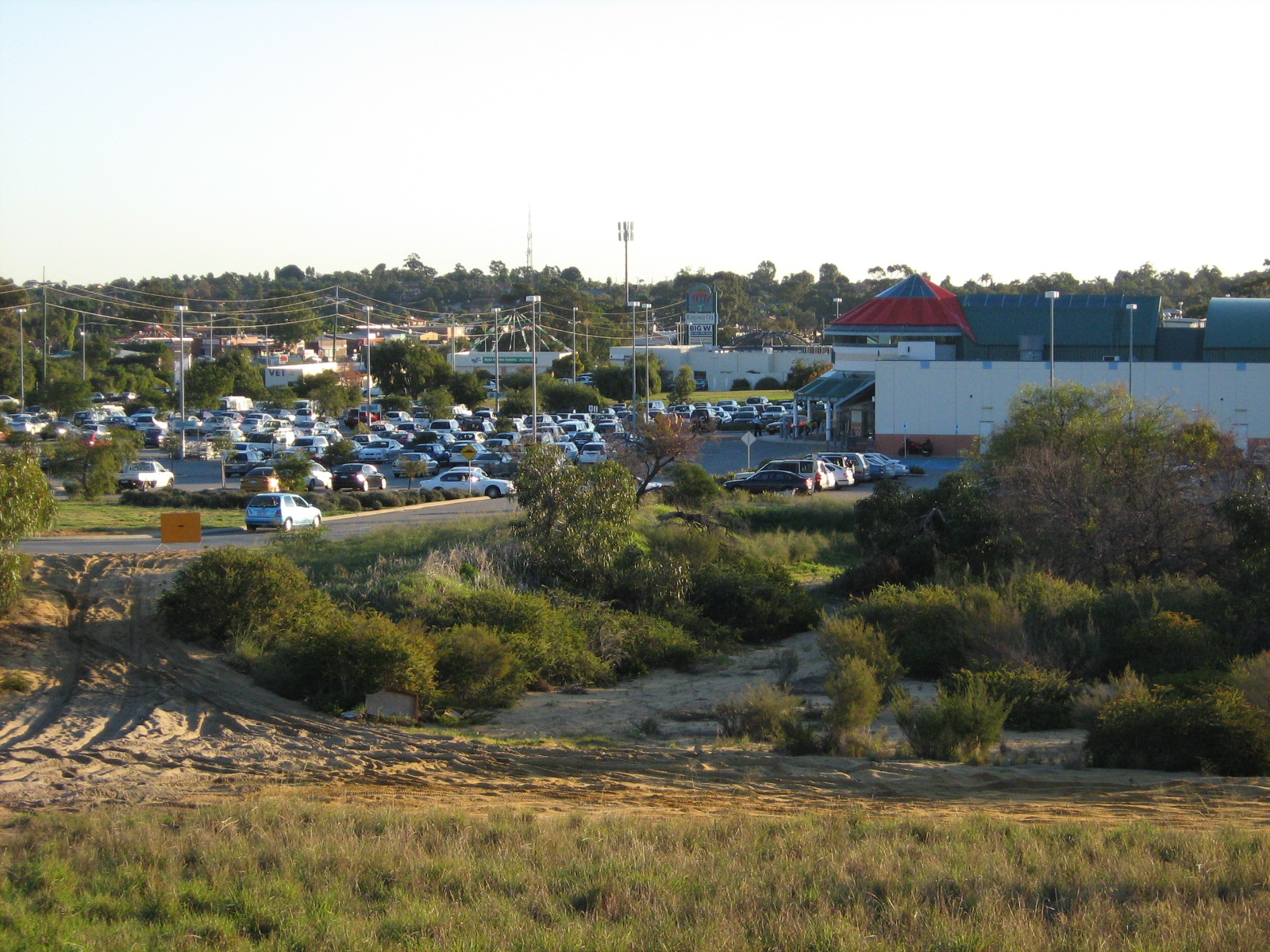
- Kingsway City shopping centre
- Interactive map of Madeley
- Coordinates: 31.811°S 115.828°E
- Country: Australia
- State: Western Australia
- City: Perth
- LGA: City of Wanneroo
- Location: 20 km (12 mi) N of Perth City
- Established: 1998

Government
  - State electorate: Landsdale
  - Federal division: Pearce

Area
  - Total: 3.1 km^{2} (1.2 sq mi)

Population
  - Total: 6,805 (SAL 2021)
- Postcode: 6065
Suburbs around Madeley
Woodvale	Wangara	Wangara
Kingsley	Madeley	Darch
Greenwood	Marangaroo	Marangaroo

Madeley is a suburb of Perth, the capital city of Western Australia 20 kilometres (12 mi) north of Perth's central business district. Its local government area is the City of Wanneroo. Previously part of Landsdale, until the 1990s much of the suburb was rural in character with market gardening a common activity. From 2001 onwards, extensive property development resulted in massive population growth, with the Property Investor Magazine of December 2007 estimating a growth rate of 33.3% per year.

== History ==
=== Name ===
Madeley was named after early landowner and former Wanneroo Road Board member George Edward Madeley.

Historically, the area was officially unnamed and residents noted their addresses as Wanneroo until the locality of Landsdale was gazetted in 1980, extending from Wanneroo Road to Alexander Drive.

In May–June 1996, with the creation of the East Wanneroo Development Area, Cell 6 was identified as a high priority for development, and was divided into western and eastern sections corresponding to modern Madeley and Darch respectively. On 10 September 1997, the City of Wanneroo resolved to name the locality Kingsway after the main east-west road running through it, and to name the area east of the proposed Skeit Road as Madeley. The Geographic Names Committee (GNC) approved Madeley, but rejected Kingsway as being too similar to Kingsley. The City, by this stage administered by commissioners, met on 17 February 1998, and decided to use Madeley for the western area, and to honour another settler family in naming the eastern section Darch. On 5 March 1998, the name Darch was approved by the GNC, formally releasing the name Madeley. The City applied for the name Madeley on 28 April 1998, and it was granted at the GNC's meeting on 19 June 1998.

== Geography ==
The suburb is bounded by Wanneroo Road to the west, Gnangara Road and the future Gnangara Road to Whitfords Avenue road reserve to the north, Hartman Drive to the east and Hepburn Avenue to the south. It contains the Kingsway City shopping centre.

== Transport ==
=== Bus ===
- 374 Whitfords Station to Mirrabooka Bus Station – serves Wanneroo Road, Gnangara Road, Susan Road, Russell Road, Regency Avenue and Kingsway
- 386 Perth Busport to Kingsway City – serves Hepburn Avenue
- 386X Perth Busport to Kingsway City (limited stops) – serves Hepburn Avenue
- 389 Perth Busport to Wanneroo – serves Wanneroo Road
- 448 Warwick Station to Kingsway City – only serves Kingsway City
- 450 Warwick Station to Ballajura Station – serves Wanneroo Road and Kingsway
- 452 Whitfords Station to Ballajura Station – serves Wanneroo Road and Gnangara Road

== Demographics ==
As at the 2016 census, the Australian Bureau of Statistics counted 6,084 residents in 2,274 dwellings, the great majority of which were detached houses on single lots.

== Politics ==
Madeley'a population generally supports the Liberal party, with it winning more than half the booth vote at both the 2004 and 2007 federal elections, but the Australian Labor Party doing the same at the 2005 state election.

The figures for 2004, 2005 and 2007 are for booths in neighbouring Darch which serve both suburbs:

2022 federal election Source: AEC
Labor	40.01%
Liberal	35.37%
Greens	10.81%
United Australia Party	3.32%
Australian Christians	3.11%

2019 federal election Source: AEC
Liberal	52.58%
Labor	31.87%
Greens	7.27%
One Nation	2.92%
Australian Christians	2.48%

2007 federal election Source: AEC
Liberal	51.7%
Labor	39.7%
Greens	3.70%
CDP	2.03%
Family First	0.98%

2004 federal election Source: AEC
Liberal	50.0%
Labor	38.6%
Greens	4.17%
CDP	3.81%
One Nation	2.18%

2005 state election Source: WAEC
Labor	52.1%
Liberal	34.1%
Family First	5.07%
CDP	3.58%
Greens	3.08%
