= City of Joondalup =

Coordinates: 31°44′42″S 115°45′58″E

- Local government area
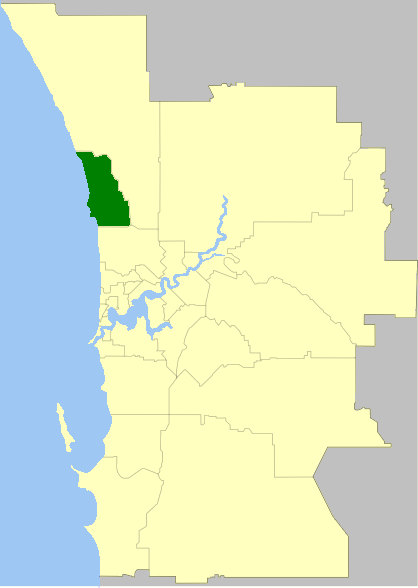
- Location of Joondalup in the Perth metropolitan area

- Interactive map of City of Joondalup
- Country: Australia
- State: Western Australia
- Region: North metropolitan Perth
- Established: 1998
- Council seat: Joondalup

Government
  - Mayor: Daniel Kingston
  - State electorate: Carine, Hillarys, Joondalup, Kingsley, Ocean Reef
  - Federal division: Moore, Cowan

Area
  - Total: 98.9 km^{2} (38.2 sq mi)

Population
  - Total: 160,003 (LGA 2021) (41st)
- Website: City of Joondalup
LGAs around City of Joondalup
	Wanneroo	Wanneroo
Indian Ocean	City of Joondalup	Wanneroo
	Stirling	Stirling

The City of Joondalup is a local government area in Perth, Western Australia. Its central business district is located in the suburb Joondalup, and it includes the town centres of Hillarys and Warwick.

== History ==
Prior to the 1970s, the region now known as the City of Joondalup was sparsely populated. During the 1980s and 1990s, massive growth occurred, partly due to State Government policies which made Joondalup a regional centre, including the extension of the Mitchell Freeway and the construction of the Joondalup railway line.

Until 1998, the area had been controlled by the City of Wanneroo and its predecessors. An independent commission suggested the creation of Joondalup out of the coastal areas of Wanneroo, and the City of Joondalup came into existence on 1 July 1998.

=== Early history ===
The city is named after Lake Joondalup. The name Joondalup is a Noongar word, first recorded in 1837 and possibly meaning either "place of whiteness or glistening", or "place of a creature that can only move backwards".

=== Early planning ===
During the latter part of the 1960s, the Metropolitan Regional Planning Authority developed the Corridor Plan for Perth which was published and adopted in 1970. The plan called for the creation of five "sub-regional" retail centres (Fremantle, Joondalup, Midland, Armadale and Rockingham) which would form the commercial and economic focus of each "node", and take the retail burden away from the CBD. The Corridor Plan was not endorsed by Parliament until 1973.

In order to grow both the five "sub-regional" retail centres and these off-corridor regional shopping centres, a Retail Shopping Policy was developed by MRPA in 1976, and a Perth Metropolitan Region Retail Structure Plan was put in place to regulate the industry. This Plan was amended as new centres were required.

Most of the land in the area remained largely undeveloped until the 1960s, and Joondalup started to become the "city of the north" towards the late 1980s to the early 1990s when houses and businesses were established in the area.

=== Development of a new city in the north ===
Release of land blocks in the future City of Joondalup proceeded slowly in 1991, with lots created in the newer suburbs of Clarkson (224), Ocean Reef (202), Kinross (185), Joondalup (168) and Woodvale (147).

The Joondalup Country Club was sold to private investors for $21 million in 1992, with the new owners being Cremorne Investments, Whale Beach Investments, Edge Cliff Investments and Grovestyle Australia from March 1992. The new owners would work with the City of Wanneroo and Joondalup Development Corporation on a new clubhouse and condominiums to the value of $80 million.

In February 1992, Services Minister Jim McGinty proposed establishing another technology park in Perth's north in the Joondalup City Centre to meet demand and diversify the city's economic base. A technology working group was formed by the Joondalup Development Corporation and representatives from Edith Cowan University and the State Development Department.

In March 1992, Planning Minister David Smith announced the government's North West Corridor Structure Plan. Joondalup was confirmed to be a future city in the north-west, not as a dormitory suburb, but the new city and its surrounding areas would have its own employment, education, health, entertainment, cultural opportunities and administration. The plan would be implemented by the City of Wanneroo.

Also in March 1992 was the announcement of the appointment of architects Philip Cox, Etherington, Coulter and Jones to design a new $25 million regional sports complex at Joondalup. The proposal called for a sports building with a sports hall, gymnasium, aerobics centre, squash courts and function, social and administrative rooms, a fenced football oval and grandstand, all-weather surface sports arena, including two floodlit hockey pitches and an athletics and soccer area with a grass track.

To boost the North West Corridor Structure Plan, Premier Carmen Lawrence announced in May 1992, the transfer of 1.5 ha of land worth $6 million to the Wanneroo City Council for civic, cultural and commercial development and $20 million, to be matched by the council, for new civic and cultural facilities. Joondalup Development Corporation would be involved in the planning and development.

June 1992 saw the Ocean Reef Road bridge at the end of the Mitchell freeway open and the tender for the completion of the new Edgewater Station just north of the bridge, was awarded after the completion of the platform walls and pedestrian footbridge. Other work completed was a main access road, roundabout and junction with Joondalup Drive.

Work on the layout and construction of Central Park in the Joondalup CBD began in August 1992 with the work completed in March 1993.

The first stage of Joondalup TAFE opened in August 1992 costing $10 million.

In September 1992, the Joondalup Development Corporation was merged into LandCorp and they would manage the future development in Joondalup.

In late December 1992, Premier Carmen Lawrence opened the Perth-Joondalup rail link with a full service running from March 1993 integrated with the bus network linking the new CBD to Perth.

Lands Minister George Cash announced in April 1993 that the contract for stage one of the Joondalup Shopping Centre had been awarded to Consolidated Constructions at $44 million and the centre would be jointly owned by LandCorp and Armstrong Jones Property Income Fund.

In May 1993, Lands Minister George Cash, at a ceremony at the beginning of the building phase of the new LandCorp and the City of Wanneroo sports complex, announced the name as the Joondalup Area. The ovals had been grassed and fenced, and the athletics track, hockey fields and tennis courts had been laid out.

Joondalup Magistrate Court was officially opened by Premier Richard Court in June 1993.

Transport Minister Eric Charlton announced in July 1993 that the $2.9 million Currambine railway station would be officially opened on 8 August which was the final phase of the railway link at that time. Initial parking for 400 cars would be provided but could be increased to 800 car parking bays eventually.

North-West Corridor was financed in the September 1993 State budget with $48.9 million allocated to LandCorp for projects in Joondalup. $12.5 million to complete Stage 1 of the Joondalup Arena, $14 million for the construction of Stage 2 of the shopping centre, $13.8 million for further releases and servicing of land, and $8.6 million for inner-city infrastructure like roads, and civic and cultural facilities. Other amounts in the Budget allocated to the Joondalup region include $4.8 million to complete Stage 1 and the construction of Stage 2 of the Joondalup TAFE, $1.2 million to complete the new Joondalup Courthouse, $950,000 for a new fire, $208,000 for the new Joondalup Primary School, $82,000 for community health needs analysis and $300,000 to begin planning and designing of new health facilities in the Wanneroo-Joondalup area. $60,000 to spend providing fuel containment bunds at Joondalup.

In November 1993, developed for $2.7 million, Lands Minister George Cash opened Central Park linking the city with Yellagonga Regional Park on Lake Joondalup.

Premier Richard Court opened the $80 million stage one of Lakeside Joondalup Shopping in November 1994. Stage one consisted of 26,500 sqm of the planned 80,000 sqm centre which was a joint venture by LandCorp and the Armstrong Jones Retail Fund. Stage two was scheduled to open in 1997 and stage three in 2000. Panels of Teflon-coated fibreglass were stretched over prefabricated steel over the centre's roof to create the illusion of huge sails.

The second stage of Joondalup TAFE opened in July 1995 costing $6 million.

In September 1995, LandCorp announced a $2 million project, part of Joondalup City North, which saw Plaistow Street designed as a residential street where thirteen display houses were built.

February 1996 saw the official opening of a new fire station to service the Joondalup region by Emergency Services Minister Bob Wiese.

Lands Minister Doug Shave announced in April 1997 that LandCorp would commit nearly $15 million on further infrastructure development in Joondalup that included the new cinemas, extending Lakeside Drive southwards, and land release around the city's CBD.

On 24 April 1996, then Health Minister Kevin Prince announced an expansion of the old Wanneroo hospital into a health campus.

In May 1996, the State Budget saw funding in the areas covering the city of Joondalup. This included a performing arts complex at Belridge High School, the expansion of the Joondalup shopping complex with 3,500 sqm extra shopping space, two new restaurants and the six cinema complex by 1998 and, the expansion of the Beenyup wastewater treatment plant on Ocean Reef Road.

The budget of 1996 saw further expansion of the Joondalup TAFE campus saw the construction of a library resource centre, student cafeteria as well as a conference and communication facilities.

In November 1996, Premier Richard Court has announced that the Mitchell Freeway will be extended 2.6 km to Hodges Drive which would give the city's CBD more direct access to the freeway.

Sport and Recreation Minister Norman Moore and Lands Minister Graham Kierath announced in November 1996 that the Western Australian Sports Centre Trust will take over ownership and management of the Arena Joondalup from LandCorp on 1 January 1997.

November 1996 also saw the announcement that the old WA Police training facility at Maylands, built-in 1961, would be moved to Joondalup with the planning of a new police academy.

Arts Minister Peter Foss opened the Joondalup Public Library in July 1997 at the Joondalup Civic Centre, at the time, the largest public library in Western Australia.

In June 2003 Planning and Infrastructure Minister Alannah MacTiernan announced that after 25 years, the Joondalup development project had been completed and that planning control by LandCorp would be handed over to the City of Joondalup. The vision began with a statutory plan by Professor Gordon Stephenson in 1977. Over those years, investments of $270 million by LandCorp and the Joondalup Development Corporation, $500 million by the State Government, $2 million by the cities of Wanneroo and Joondalup and more than $1 billion by the private sector had been spent developing the new city.

=== New local government ===
June 1997 saw Local Government Minister Paul Omodei make a formal proposal to the Local Government Advisory Board that it split the City of Wanneroo into two local governments. The proposal was for the new City of Joondalup to have a northern boundary close to Tamala Park while its eastern boundary would be set by Wanneroo Road and Lake Joondalup.

By March 1998 a decision had been made and Local Government Minister Paul Omodei announced that the City of Wanneroo is to be split into two local governments, the City of Joondalup and the Shire of Wanneroo and that would occur on 1 July 1998 and would be both run by commissioner’s until future elections were held. The boundary of the City of Joondalup at its northern end, would start from the ocean through Balirgowie Heights to the northern alignment of the freeway, follow the eastern side of Lake Joondalup to Ocean Reef Road, then east to Wanneroo Road to Beach Road in the south then west to Marmion Avenue and back into Beach Road to the sea at Marmion.

All existing employees of the City of Wanneroo were transferred to the new City of Joondalup but would manage both local governments and all existing local laws, town planning schemes and contracts would continue to operate and apply to both, but each would have different budgets. The commissioners would have to split the existing assets between the two local governments as well as decide on the usage of eighteen reserve accounts worth $26 million. The commissioner's for both local governments would be Chairman Campbell Ansell and deputy Harry Morgan with others including Robert Rowell, Marilyn Clark-Murphy and Wendy Buckley.

=== 2003–2004 Council controversy ===
Joondalup City's elected Council (including the Mayor) was suspended by Tom Stephens, the Minister for Local Government, on 5 December 2003 after receiving complaints indicating that the Council had become dysfunctional. The Council was replaced by five Commissioners; Chairman John Paterson (former Mayor of Nedlands), Peter Clough, Michael Anderson, Anne Fox and Steve Smith. The Council's power was temporarily transferred to the Commissioners, for a period envisioned to last until the Local Government elections in May 2005 (as it turned out, the next elections were in fact held in May 2006, under Section 4.14 of the Local Government Act 1995 ).

A subsequent inquiry, referred to as the McIntyre Inquiry after its chairman Greg McIntyre, revealed in October 2005 that the Council had effectively split into two opposing groups over a controversy surrounding the qualifications of the city's chief executive officer (CEO). The CEO in question, Denis Smith, was accused of misrepresenting his educational qualifications by Deputy Mayor Don Carlos. Don Carlos demanded Denis Smith's immediate dismissal, but his motion was unsuccessful. The councillors opposed to Denis Smith's dismissal expressed the view that the CEO should not be dismissed as his performance was satisfactory. Instead, the council passed a motion forbidding Don Carlos from publicly criticising Denis Smith.

Troy Pickard subsequently became Mayor of Joondalup at the 2006 election.

== Geography ==
The city is bounded by Beach Road to the south, Wanneroo Road and Lake Joondalup to the east, Tamala Park to the north and the Indian Ocean to the west.

=== Suburbs ===
The suburbs of the City of Joondalup with population and size figures based on the most recent Australian census:

Suburb	Population	Area	Map
Beldon	4,094 (SAL 2021)	2.2 km^{2} (0.85 sq mi)	
Burns Beach	4,071 (SAL 2021)	3.4 km^{2} (1.3 sq mi)	
Connolly	3,675 (SAL 2021)	2.9 km^{2} (1.1 sq mi)	
Craigie	6,456 (SAL 2021)	4.7 km^{2} (1.8 sq mi)	
Currambine	6,834 (SAL 2021)	3.2 km^{2} (1.2 sq mi)	
Duncraig	15,982 (SAL 2021)	7.7 km^{2} (3.0 sq mi)	
Edgewater	4,657 (SAL 2021)	4.9 km^{2} (1.9 sq mi)	
Greenwood	9,861 (SAL 2021)	5.3 km^{2} (2.0 sq mi)	
Heathridge	6,898 (SAL 2021)	3.9 km^{2} (1.5 sq mi)	
Hillarys	11,200 (SAL 2021)	6.4 km^{2} (2.5 sq mi)	
Iluka	5,669 (SAL 2021)	2.6 km^{2} (1.0 sq mi)	
Joondalup	9,193 (SAL 2021)	10.7 km^{2} (4.1 sq mi)	
Kallaroo	5,305 (SAL 2021)	2.9 km^{2} (1.1 sq mi)	
Kingsley	13,204 (SAL 2021)	7.6 km^{2} (2.9 sq mi)	
Kinross	6,988 (SAL 2021)	2.8 km^{2} (1.1 sq mi)	
Marmion	2,390 (SAL 2021)	1.2 km^{2} (0.46 sq mi)	
Mullaloo	6,190 (SAL 2021)	3.1 km^{2} (1.2 sq mi)	
Ocean Reef	8,125 (SAL 2021)	5.4 km^{2} (2.1 sq mi)	
Padbury	8,626 (SAL 2021)	6.1 km^{2} (2.4 sq mi)	
Sorrento	7,795 (SAL 2021)	3.6 km^{2} (1.4 sq mi)	
Warwick	3,858 (SAL 2021)	3 km^{2} (1.2 sq mi)	
Woodvale	9,579 (SAL 2021)	7.4 km^{2} (2.9 sq mi)	

=== Monuments and public art ===
There are many examples of public art in the City of Joondalup. Some examples include Interlace (2015) by Geoffrey Drake-Brockman an interactive artwork in the Central Walk in the CBD, A Kiss Before Parting Burns Beach by artist Coral Lowry, 30 untitled bronze plaques (1998) at the Joondalup Library and Civic Centre Underpass, Catch of the Day Burns Beach by artist Andrew Kay (2008) and, For The Boys (2002) in Kingsley, in memory to those who lost their lives in the Bali Bombings.

In Neil Hawkins Park, close to the CBD, stands the Bibulmun Woman statue and honours the original Nyoongar inhabitants of the area. The West Australian Police Academy has two memorials, the J Pitman and Walsh Memorial honouring two murdered dectivives and the Police Memorial commemorating members of the WA Police that have died during their duties.

Other public art and monuments include the Rotary Dolphin Community Wishing Well at Hillarys Boat Harbour, the Homicide Victims Memorial at Pinnaroo Valley Memorial Park, Padbury, the Patrick Marmion monument at Geneff Park, Sorrento, honouring the early pioneer in the area and close to the site of an old whaling station from 1849 to 1852. There is also the Woodvale Memorial Grove in Yellagonga Regional Park and Bennyowlee plaque all in Woodvale.

The City has several war memorials. In the CBD at Central Park is the Joondalup War Memorial honouring those who served in First and Second World Wars and the Vietnam War. Its 10 metre high stone and bronze memorial, unveiled in April 1996 designed by sculptors Charles Smith and Joan Walsh-Smith. Another important war memorial is the Ocean Reef 100th ANZAC Memorial which was also designed by sculptors Charlie Smith and Joan Walsh-Smith with a 12 metre wide and 6 metre high arch facing the sea with words on the steel frame and images from where Australian's fought wars.

== Demographics ==
The City covers an area of 98.9 square kilometres (38.2 sq mi) from Kinross in the north, to Warwick in the south, with a population of almost 155,000 at the 2016 Census. Of the population, 49.6% are males with 50.4% females. Aboriginal and Torres Strait Islander make up 0.7% of the population. In the city, 83.9% of the population are Australian citizens. At the 2016 census, 37.8% of the city's population were born overseas with 17.9% of the population were born in the United Kingdom, followed by South African at 3.6%, while the area was also home to significant New Zealand, Irish, Zimbabwean, Indian, Malaysian and Chinese minorities. 85.2% of the city's population speak English only.

In the 2016 census, there were 53,078 separate houses in the City, 6,002 medium density dwellings, and 955 high density dwellings accounting for 99.6% of dwelling types. 78% of households owned their home, 15.8% were renting, and 0.8% were in social housing.

In the 2016 census, the labour force in the City was said to be 84,791 persons with the number in employment at 93.1%.

In 2016, when comes to weekly household income 31.4% of households earned an income of $2,500 or more per week while 11.9% were considered low income households.

Historical population

Year	Pop.	±% p.a.
1991	122,152	—
1996	140,193	+2.79%
2001	147,126	+0.97%
2006	149,673	+0.34%

Year	Pop.	±% p.a.
2011	152,406	+0.36%
2016	154,445	+0.27%
2021	160,003	+0.71%

=== Religion ===
In the 2016 census, 59.4% of the city claimed to be religious with 86,516 people claiming to be Christians while another 5,226 indicated a religion other than Christianity. Of the religious portion of the population, 23.3% are Catholics and 18.4% are Anglicans. Islam accounts for 0.8% of the religious population with Hinduism at 0.7% while Judaism accounts for 0.1%.

== Heritage listed places ==
As of 2024, 41 places are heritage-listed in the City of Joondalup, of which one is on the State Register of Heritage Places, the Luisini Winery. The winery was added to the register on 16 March 2001, with the winery building having been constructed in 1929.

== Law and government ==
=== Government ===
The residents of the City of Joondalup are represented by a mayor, who as of 2025 is, Daniel Kingston, and twelve councillors representing six wards. The councillors, as of 2025, are Adrian Hill, Matthew Count, Christopher May, John Chester, John Raftis, Nige Jones, Denise Mercer, Russ Fishwick, Rebecca Pizzey, Lewis Hutton, Rohan O'Neill and Phillip Vinciullo, who serve four year terms.

==== Local government wards and suburbs ====
The six wards, each represented by two councillors:

Ward	Suburbs, villages and districts
North Ward	Burns Beach, Currambine, Joondalup City Centre, Kinross
North Central Ward	Connolly, Edgewater, Heathridge, Iluka, Ocean Reef
Central Ward	Beldon, Craigie, Mullaloo, Woodvale*
South West Ward	Kallaroo, Hillarys, Sorrento
South Ward	Padbury, Duncraig, Marmion,
South East Ward	Greenwood, Kingsley, Warwick

* Part of Woodvale is located within the City of Wanneroo.

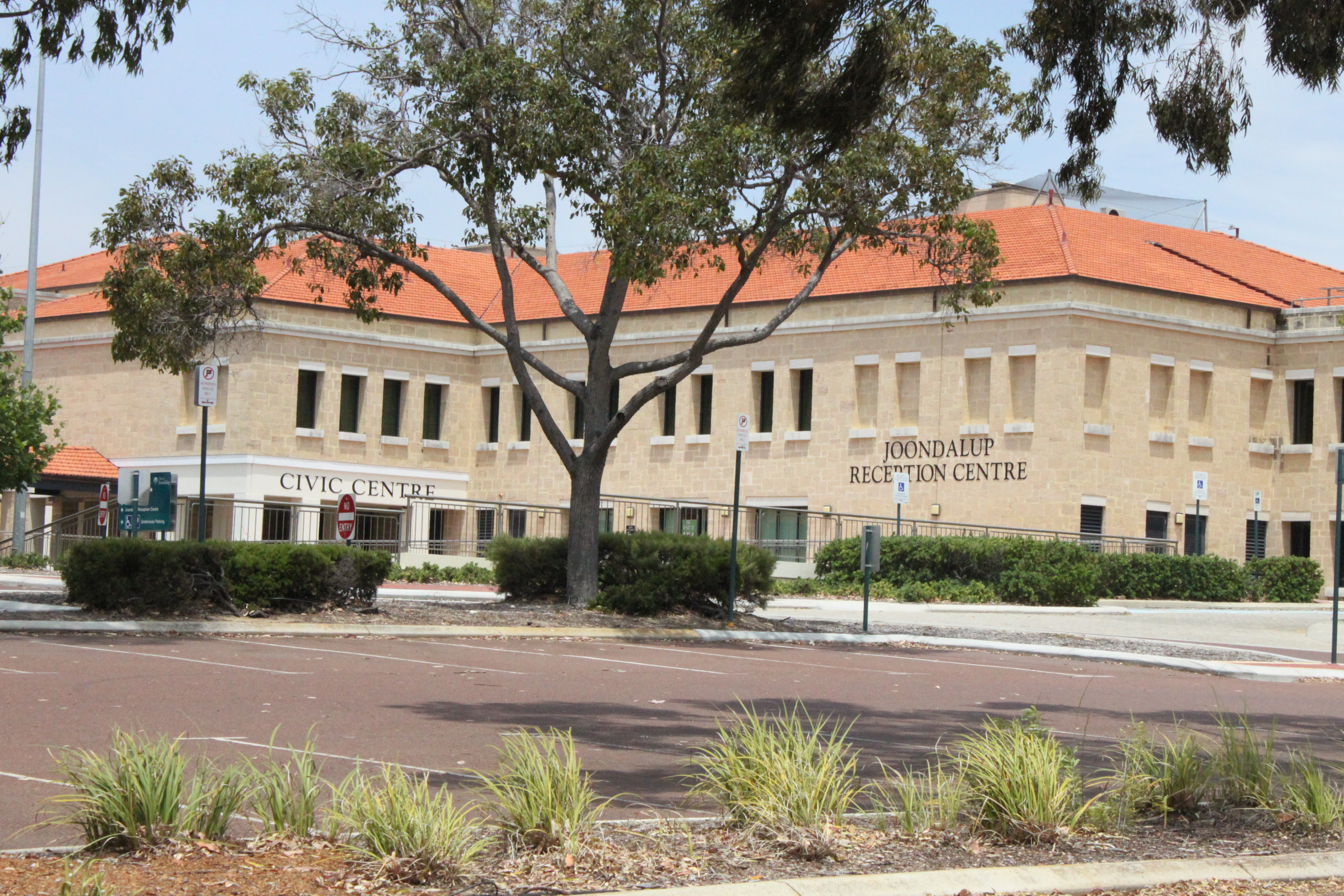
Joondalup Civic Centre, the seat of the City of Joondalup council and office of the mayor

The council chambers for the City of Joondalup are located in the suburb of Joondalup in its central business district. The complex includes Joondalup Library, which serves as the central library and local history centre for both the City of Joondalup and the City of Wanneroo local authorities.

The mayor is directly elected by residents to a four year term and serves as the principal representative of the city, presiding over council meetings and providing civic leadership.

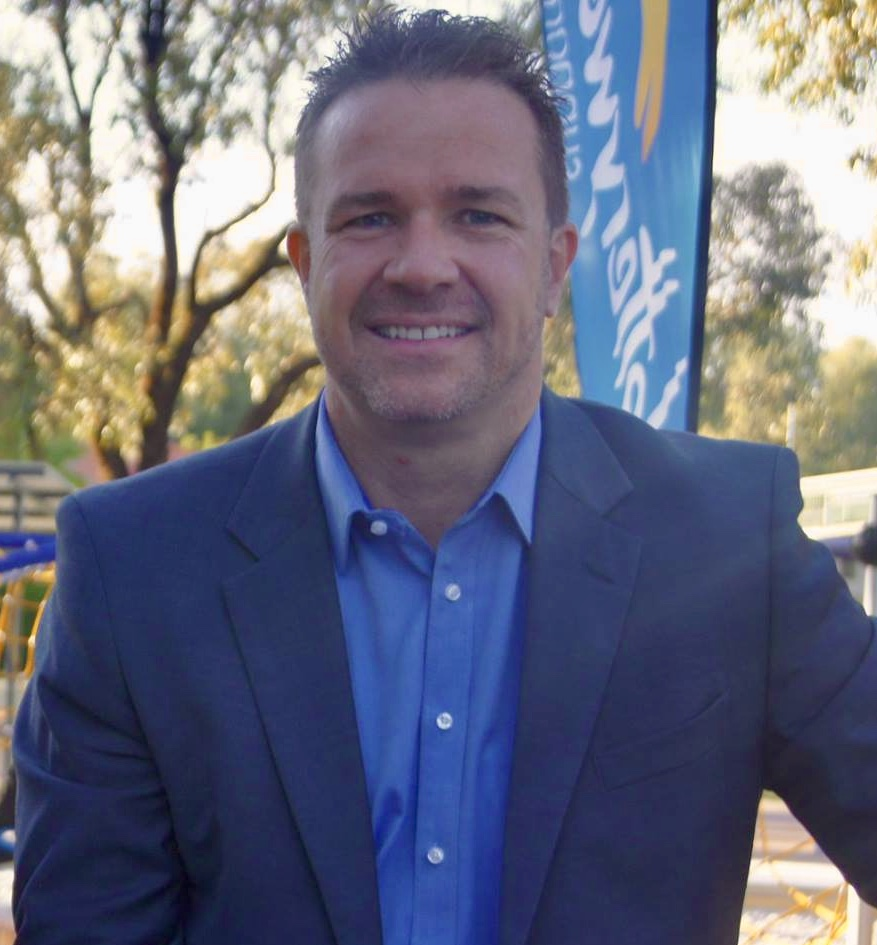
Troy Pickard

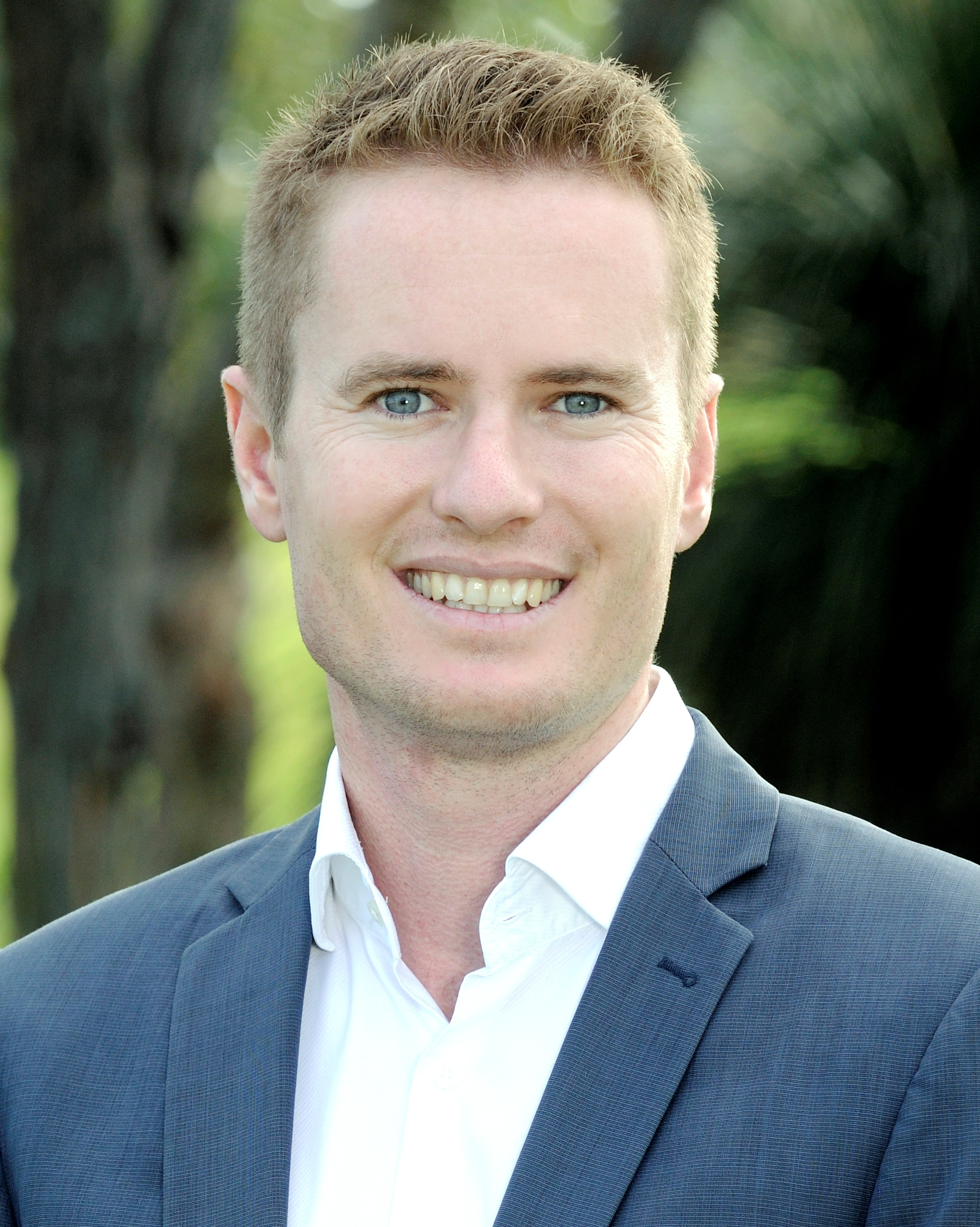
Albert Jacob

==== List of mayors ====
People who have served as mayor of the City include:

Mayor	Term	Notes
John Bombak	1998–2003	Inaugural mayor
Don Carlos	2003	Served briefly before council suspension
None December 2003—May 2006		Council suspended
Troy Pickard	2006–2017	Later WALGA & ALGA president
Albert Jacob	2017–2025	Former MLA and Environment & Heritage Minister
Daniel Kingston	2025–(term expires in 2029)	Youngest Joondalup mayor

==== Other representation ====
At state parliament level, the City of Joondalup's resident's are represented in the Western Australian Legislative Assembly's North Metropolitan Region in five electoral districts Burns Beach, Carine, Hillarys, Kingsley and Joondalup.

In the Australian federal parliament, the City is part of the Division of Moore and is currently represented by member Tom French.

=== Law ===
The Western Australia Police Force has a police station based in Joondalup and covers their Joondalup District. There are two other police stations in the City, one at Hillarys and the other in Warwick.

The WA Magistrates Court has metropolitan court based in Joondalup that deals with both criminal offences and civil claims for debt or damages and non-offences.

== Education ==
=== Colleges and universities ===
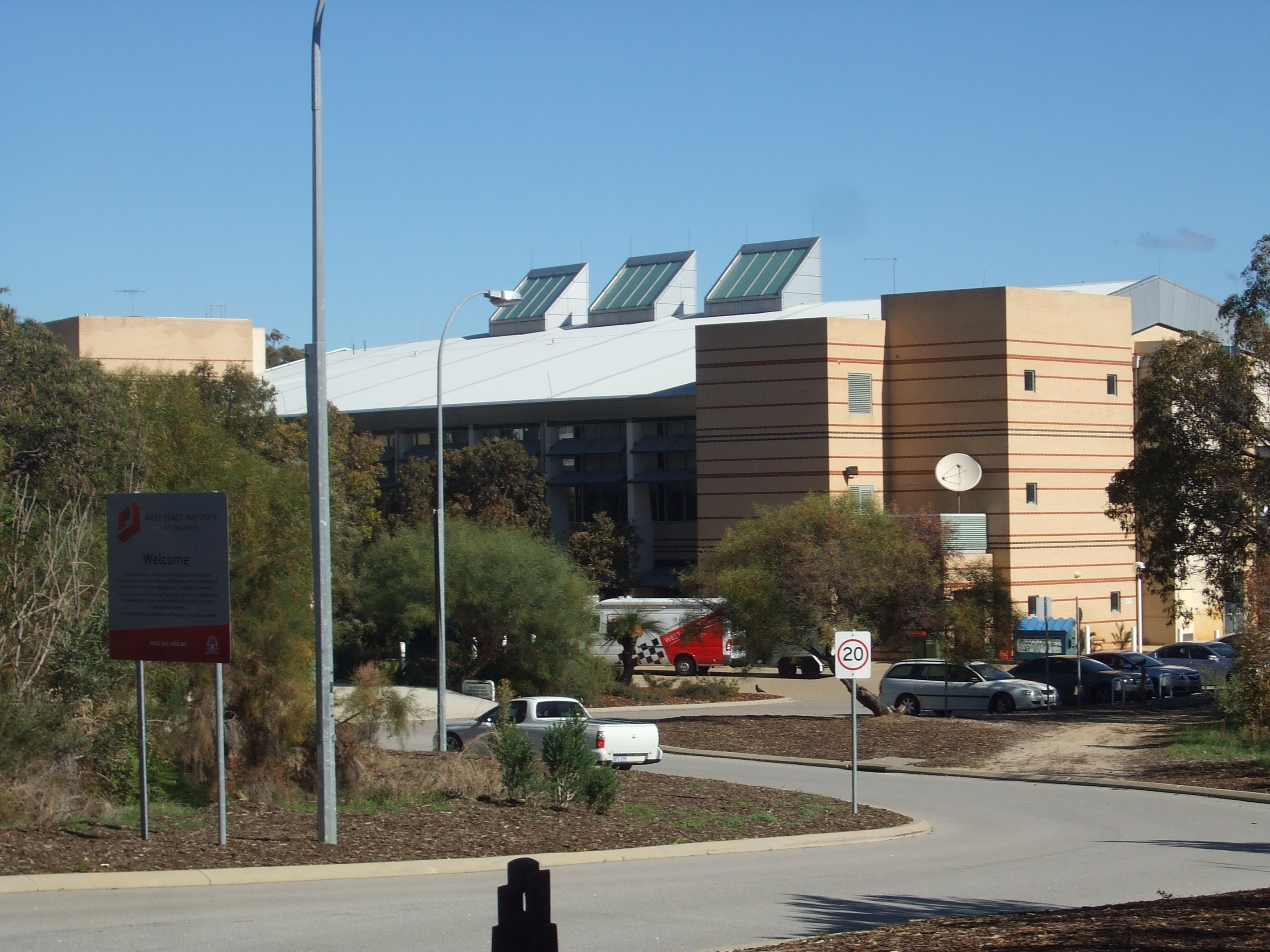
West Coast Institute of Training

The Joondalup suburb is a major location for tertiary education in the northern suburbs and is known as the Joondalup Learning Precinct. The North Metropolitan TAFE has a campus in Joondalup providing state government education to meet the demands of students wanting to enter the workforce with up-to-date, industry-specific, practical skills. It was previously called the West Coast Institute of Training.

Edith Cowan University has a major campus based in the suburb. It offers graduate and post graduate degrees on the campus that also includes, libraries, guilds, commercial shops, sporting facilities, and student housing.

Situated in the same Joondalup Learning Precinct as ECU and the TAFE campuses is the West Australian Police Academy. The Western Australia Police's training academy was moved from Maylands to Joondalup and was officially opened on 15 February 2002.

== Infrastructure ==
=== Transportation ===
==== Roads ====
The suburbs of the City of Joondalup are served by three major north-south roads. To the west, the State Route 71 Marmion Avenue, in the centre by the Mitchell Freeway, and in the east, partially by State Route 60 Wanneroo Road. The other major route through the suburb is State Route 85, Joondalup Drive which leads to the Tonkin Highway and when completed, the Brand Highway and Great Northern Highway. The coast is served by the tourist route, West Coast Drive.

==== Bus services ====
Transperth provide public bus services for the Perth metro area and this includes the City of Joondalup. The routes terminate at trains stations throughout the City.

A free service called the CAT buses (routes 10 and 11) which travel a circular route around the city's Joondalup's central business district, ferrying passengers to Joondalup Health Campus, Edith Cowan University, North Metropolitan TAFE and Joondalup CBD among other destinations.

==== Passenger rail ====
Transperth provides public rail services for the Perth metro area and this includes the City of Joondalup. The city is served by six train stations on the Yanchep line (known as the Joondalup line prior to 14 July 2024) which connects it to the Perth CBD in the south and Yanchep in the north. The stations are Warwick, Greenwood, Whitfords, Edgewater, Joondalup and Currambine. The main station is at Joondalup and all stations bar Greenwood and Edgewater have bus stations that connect them to the City's suburbs. All have free and paid carparks. The rail track follows the Mitchell Freeway, built on the central reservation.

==== Bicycle ====
There are bike parking areas at all six stations in the city. Some have secure bike shelters, but all have lockers and bike racks.

==== Airports ====
The City has no airport within its jurisdiction. The nearest airports are at Perth Airport with both domestic and international flights and Jandakot Airport which services private and other small commercial aircraft.

==== Harbours ====
The City has no port but is served by two boat harbours maintained by the Department of Transport. Hillarys Boat Harbour has boat launch facilities, boat and yacht pens and a ferry service to Rottnest Island. Ocean Reef Boat Harbour is the other harbour but only has launch sites. The latter is currently under approval to be converted into a marina with commercial and residential precincts.

=== Utilities ===
Electricity to households within the City of Joondalup is supplied by the retailer Synergy and the electricity price paid are government regulated. Solar Feed-in tariffs are paid for excess energy generated by solar power units.

Household gas supply is deregulated and customers in the City of Joondalup can choose their provider. Only five retailers currently supply gas to homes, these are Alinta Energy, AGL, Origin Energy, Kleenheat Gas and Simply Energy.

Water and sewerage services are supplied to the city by the Water Corporation.

=== Health systems ===
The WA Health Department has a hospital based in the suburb Joondalup and serves the northern suburbs. Called the Joondalup Health Campus, it has an emergency department and a public and private hospital all maintained as a private public partnership by Ramsay Health Care. The campus also caters for older adult mental health services, mental health services and an after hours GP Clinic.

Other private hospitals and clinics in the city include Glengarry Private Hospital in the suburb of Duncraig and Craigie Day Surgery in Craigie.

== Sister cities ==
- Jinan, Shandong, China (September 2004)
