= Wangara, Western Australia =

Wangara
- Suburb
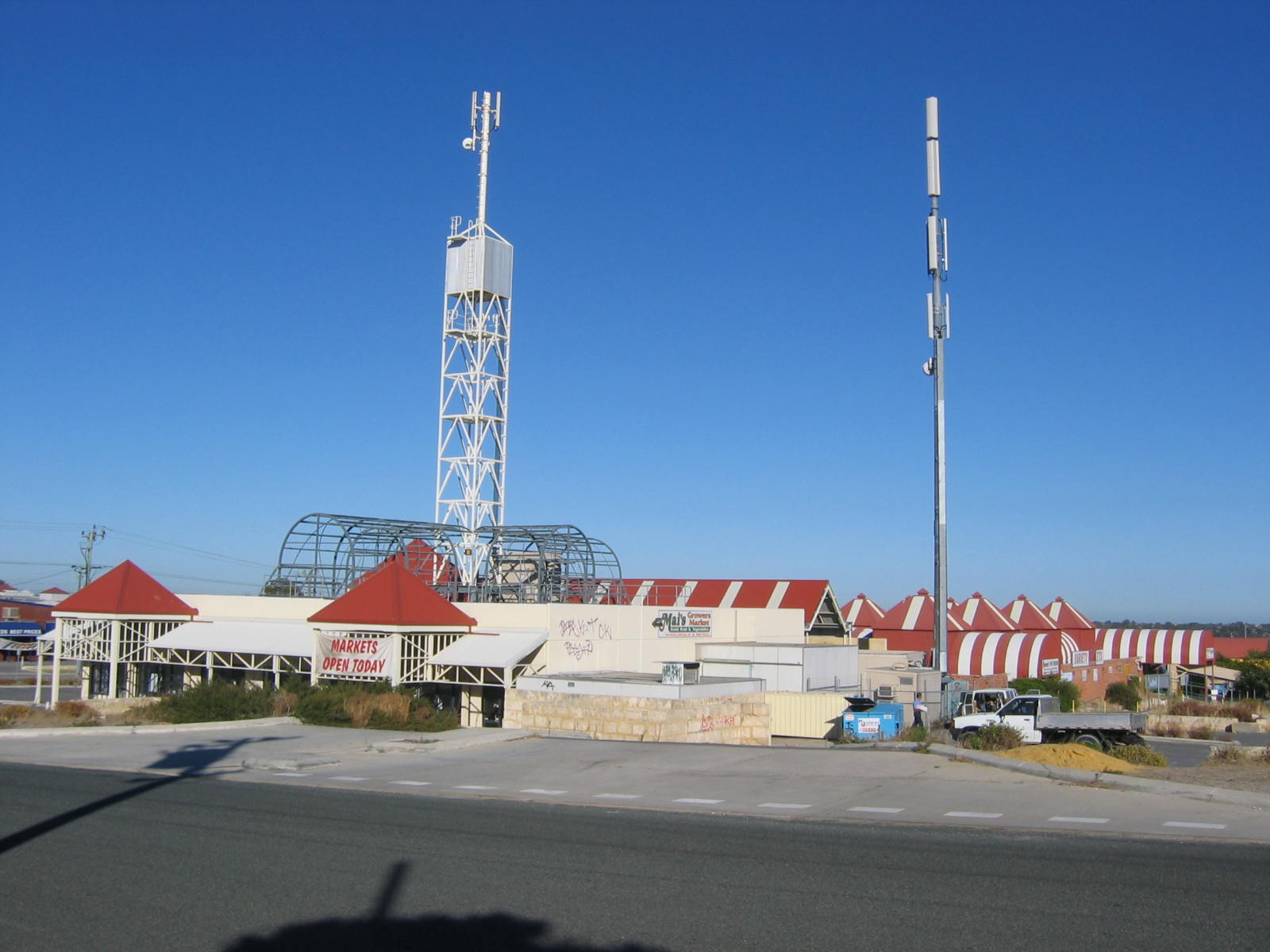
- Wanneroo Market in Wangara
- Interactive map of Wangara
- Coordinates: 31.791°S 115.829°E
- Country: Australia
- State: Western Australia
- City: Perth
- LGA: City of Wanneroo

Government
  - State electorate: Landsdale
  - Federal division: Pearce

Area
  - Total: 5.6 km^{2} (2.2 sq mi)

Population
  - Total: 43 (SAL 2021)
- Postcode: 6065
Suburbs around Wangara
Wanneroo	Wanneroo; Pearsall	Gnangara
Woodvale	Wangara	Gnangara
Kingsley	Madeley	Landsdale

Wangara is a light industrial suburb of Perth, Western Australia, located within the City of Wanneroo.

Wangara is one of Perth's busiest industrial areas. It is situated roughly 20 km north of the central business district, and is the industrial hub of the north side of Perth. It is also roughly 10 km from Joondalup, Perth's largest satellite city north of the Swan River. It has a wide range of warehouses and industrial services, and some commercial services such as new and used car dealerships, mechanics, industrial work wear, excavation services, landscaping products, and gas conversion.

== Transport ==
The Transperth operated bus route 389 runs from Wanneroo to Perth, up and down Wanneroo Road. The 455 and 468 run services to Whitfords railway station and down Prindiville Drive, to Joondalup Station or Ellenbrook. On the southern end route 452 runs from Whitfords to Ballajura via Landsdale.

=== Bus ===
- 389 Wanneroo to Perth Busport – serves Wanneroo Road
- 452 Whitfords Station to Ballajura Station – serves Gnangara Road
- 455 Whitfords Station to Ellenbrook Central – serves Wanneroo Road, Prindiville Drive, Hartman Drive, Motivation Drive, Conquest Way, Distinction Road, Wisdom Terrace and Niche Parade
- 468 Whitfords Station to Joondalup Station – serves Wanneroo Road
