= Greenwood, Western Australia =

Greenwood
- Suburb
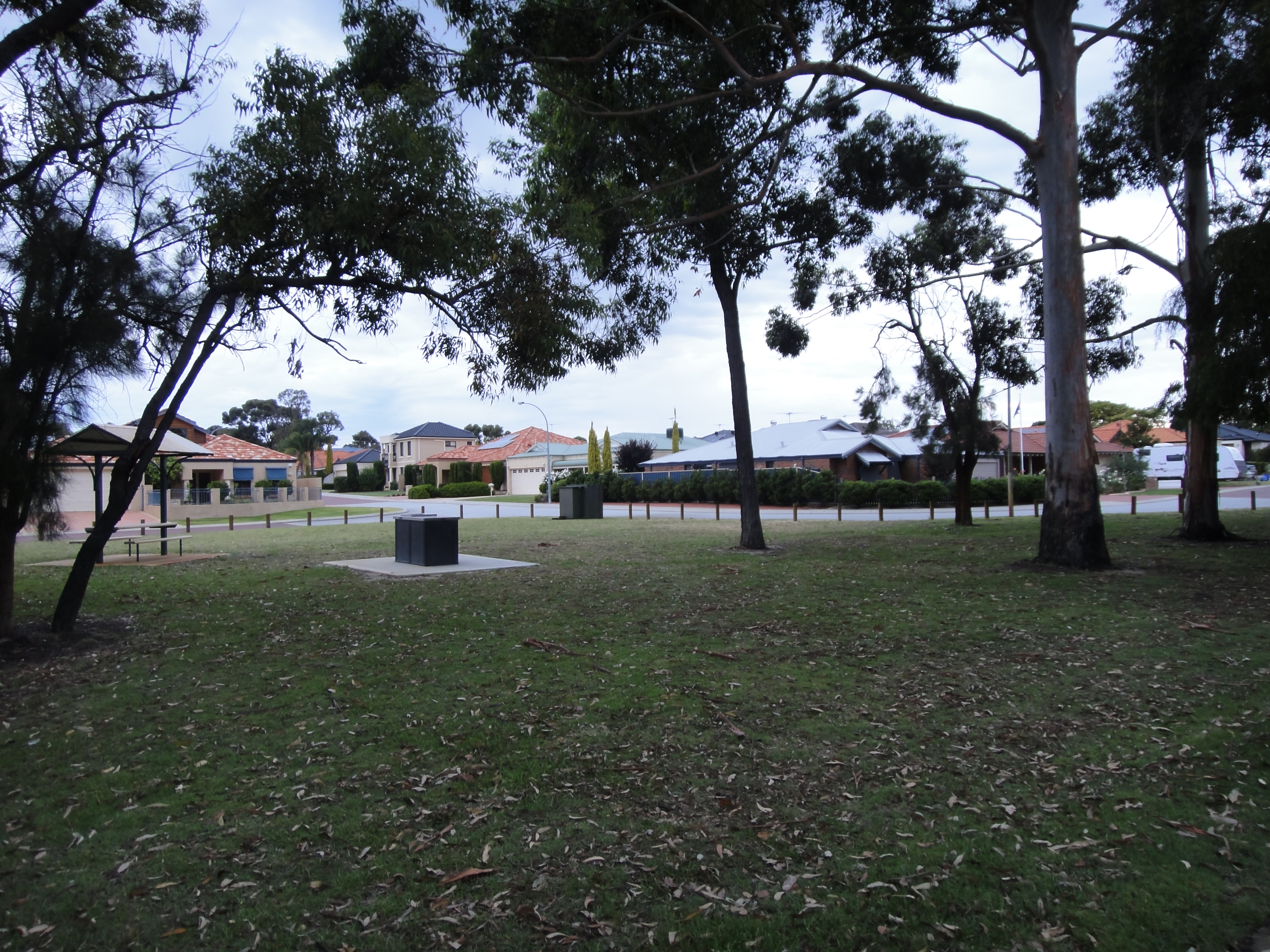
- Parklands in Greenwood
- Interactive map of Greenwood
- Coordinates: 31.827°S 115.802°E
- Country: Australia
- State: Western Australia
- City: Perth
- LGA: City of Joondalup
- Location: 18 km (11 mi) from Perth CBD
- Established: 1970

Government
  - State electorate: Kingsley
  - Federal division: Cowan

Area
  - Total: 5.3 km^{2} (2.0 sq mi)

Population
  - Total: 9,861 (SAL 2021)
- Postcode: 6024
Suburbs around Greenwood
Padbury	Kingsley	Madeley
Duncraig	Greenwood	Marangaroo
Duncraig	Warwick	Girrawheen

Greenwood is a suburb of Perth, Western Australia, located in the City of Joondalup. The suburb is located 18 km from Perth's central business district. It is bordered by the Mitchell Freeway, Hepburn ave, Wanneroo road and Warwick road.

== History ==
The Gold Land Development Corporation used the name Greenwood Forest as the promotional name of the estate which commenced development in the area in 1969. The reserve between the suburbs of Duncraig and Greenwood was used for the construction of the Mitchell Freeway in 1985–1986.

== Education ==
Greenwood is home to a senior high school and three primary schools:

- Greenwood College
- Greenwood Primary School
- West Greenwood Primary School
- Liwara Catholic Primary School

The original Greenwood Primary School closed in 1997 and the land was sub-divided and sold as residential lots. During June 2007, the government announced that Allenswood Primary School and East Greenwood Primary schools would amalgamate, temporarily at the East Greenwood site, and a new school would be built on the Allenswood site. Allenswood primary closed at the end of the 2007 school year and was demolished, making way for the construction of the new school, expected to be completed in late 2009. In 2008, East Greenwood Primary School was renamed Greenwood Primary School, later relocating, at the commencement of Term 4 2010 to the newly constructed, ex Allenswood Primary Site. East Greenwood Primary was then also demolished.

Greenwood Senior High School became independent in 2011-2012 and changed its name to Greenwood College.

== Shopping and commercial ==
The north-eastern corner contains a small commercial/industrial area centred on Canham Way. This precinct hosts a variety of businesses including a butcher, tyre store, landscaping supplies, martial arts, reticulation, hardware, thrift shop and others. A small commercial centre is located on Wanneroo Road, south of Canham Way.

The main shopping centre in the suburb is Greenwood Village Shopping Centre, on Calectasia Street. The centre includes a Coles supermarket and a range of other retailers, including a butcher, bakery, 24 Hour gym, greengrocer, pharmacy, pizza shop, newsagent, barber, Post Office and others.

Located toward the north-western corner of Greenwood is the smaller Coolibah Plaza Shopping Centre which trades 7 days a week. There are 10 businesses in the centre including a Farmer Jacks supermarket, newsagent, bakery, a fish and chip shop and both a Malaysian and Thai restaurant.

== Transport ==
The suburb is served by Transperth bus routes 445, 446, 447 running in both directions between the Warwick and Whitfords rail interchange stations, and by the bus route 344 running from the Warwick station along the Warwick Road. The suburb is also served by the Greenwood railway station. Greenwood is bordered on the south by Warwick Road and on the north by Hepburn Avenue. Both of these roads have northbound and southbound entrances and exits to the Mitchell Freeway, which forms the western boundary for the suburb.

== Religion ==
There are 4 churches in Greenwood:

- All Saints Catholic Church (located adjacent to Liwara Catholic Primary School)
- Greenwood Uniting Church
- Lakeside Christian Church
- St John the Evangelist Anglican Church

== Sports ==
Penistone Reserve is a large reserve that caters for cricket, lacrosse, football and soccer. It is adjacent to the Greenwood Primary School. The Greenwood Cricket Club play at the reserve and 2007/2008 will be the club's 30th season.

Blackall Reserve, adjacent to the former Greenwood Primary School site, is also a popular sporting area. Cricket is played on the concrete and astroturf pitch. Other sports and leisure activities are carried out on the oval.

Warrigal Park, near Greenwood College just next to the schools soccer oval is a popular sporting area where Australian Rules Football is played.

Greenwood Park, just next to Greenwood Train Station off Wahroonga way is a large park that has a BMX track and a basketball hoop.

Oleaster Reserve, next to Blackall Drive has a good playground and a basketball hoop.

The Rob Hancock Memorial Golf Course is the only free Disc Golf course in Western Australia. It is located on Mulligan Drive. It has nine holes, and hold tournaments throughout the year.

== Gallery ==
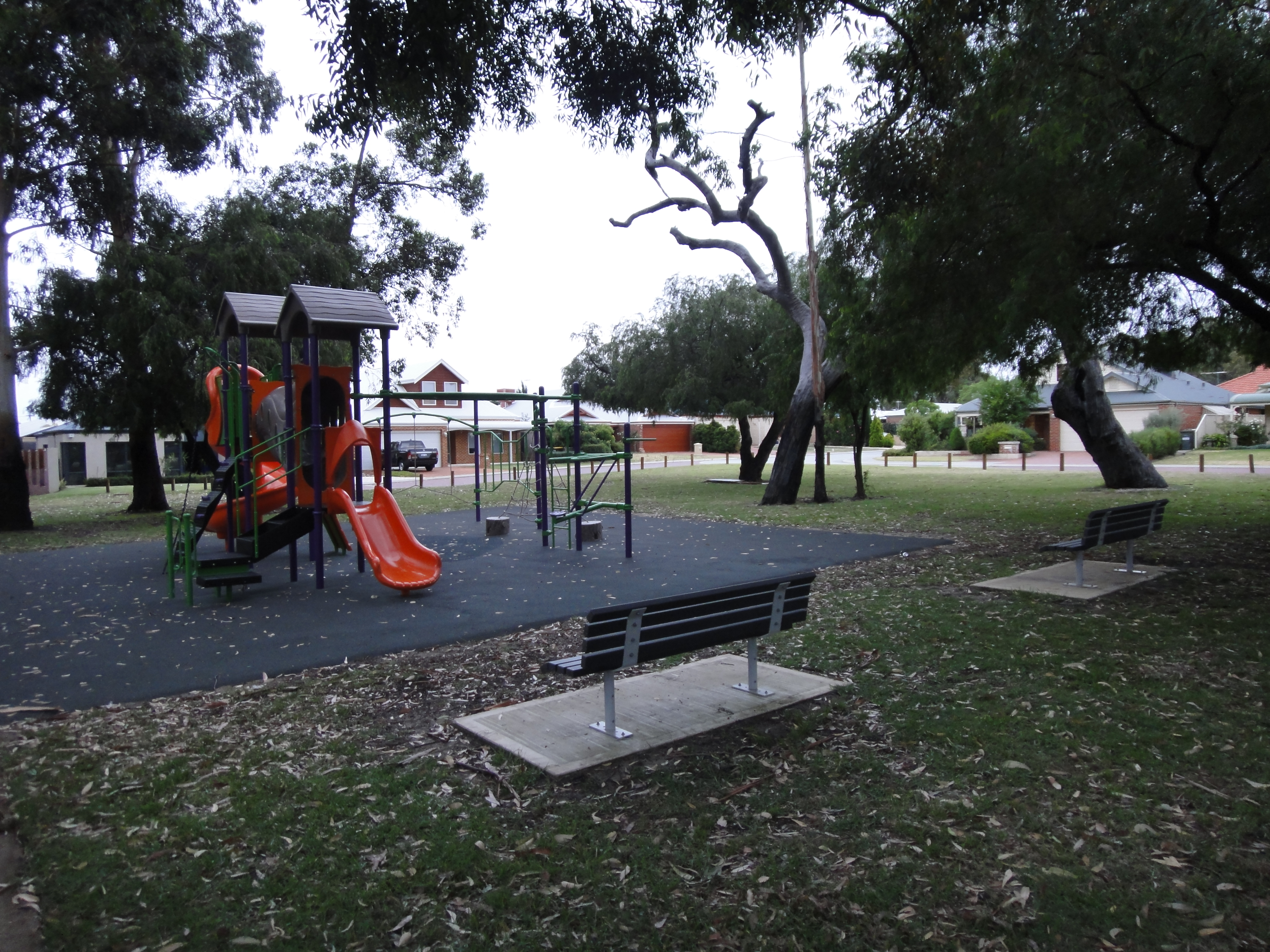
Mamo Park. The former Greenwood Primary School site.

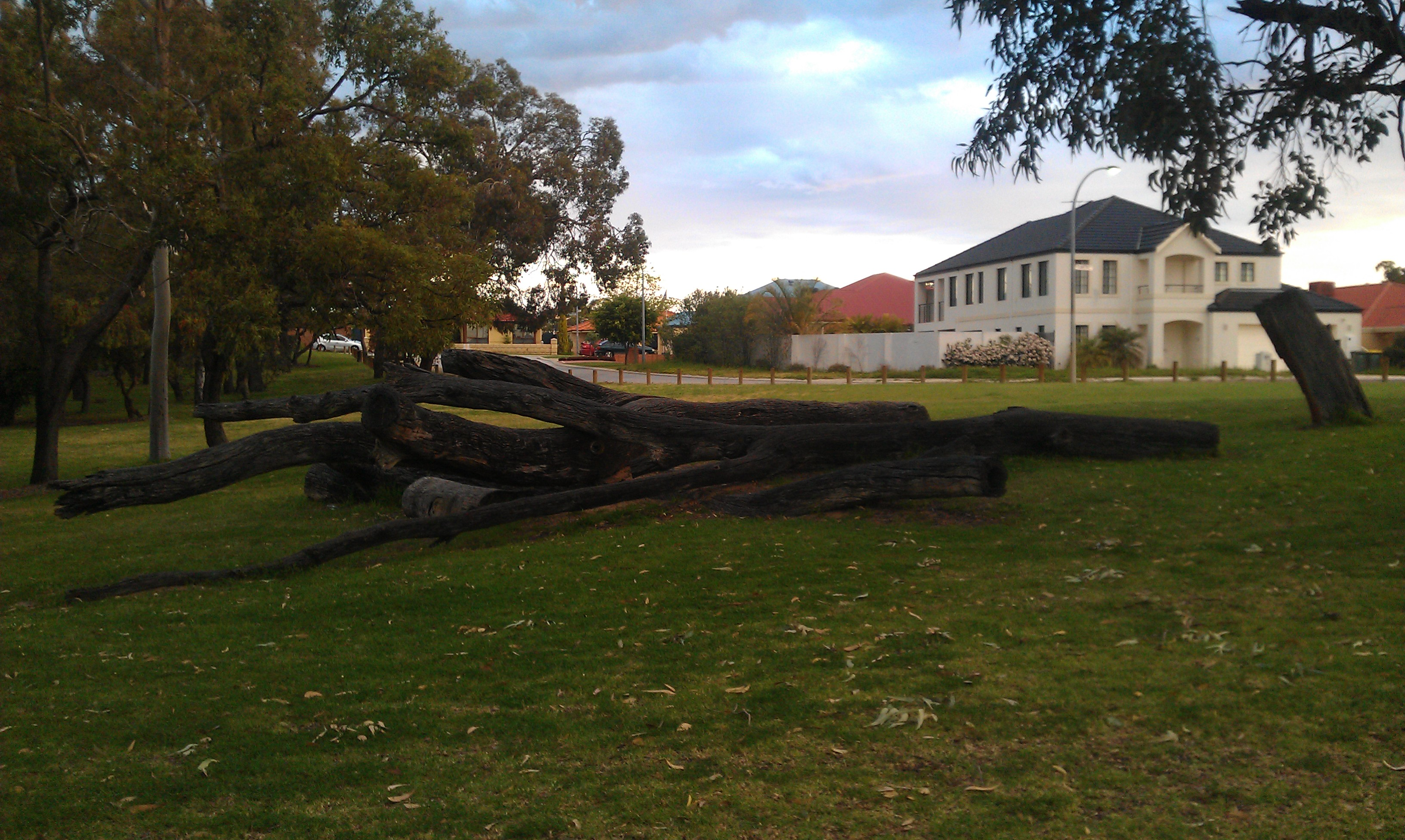
Log play equipment from the old Greenwood Primary School site

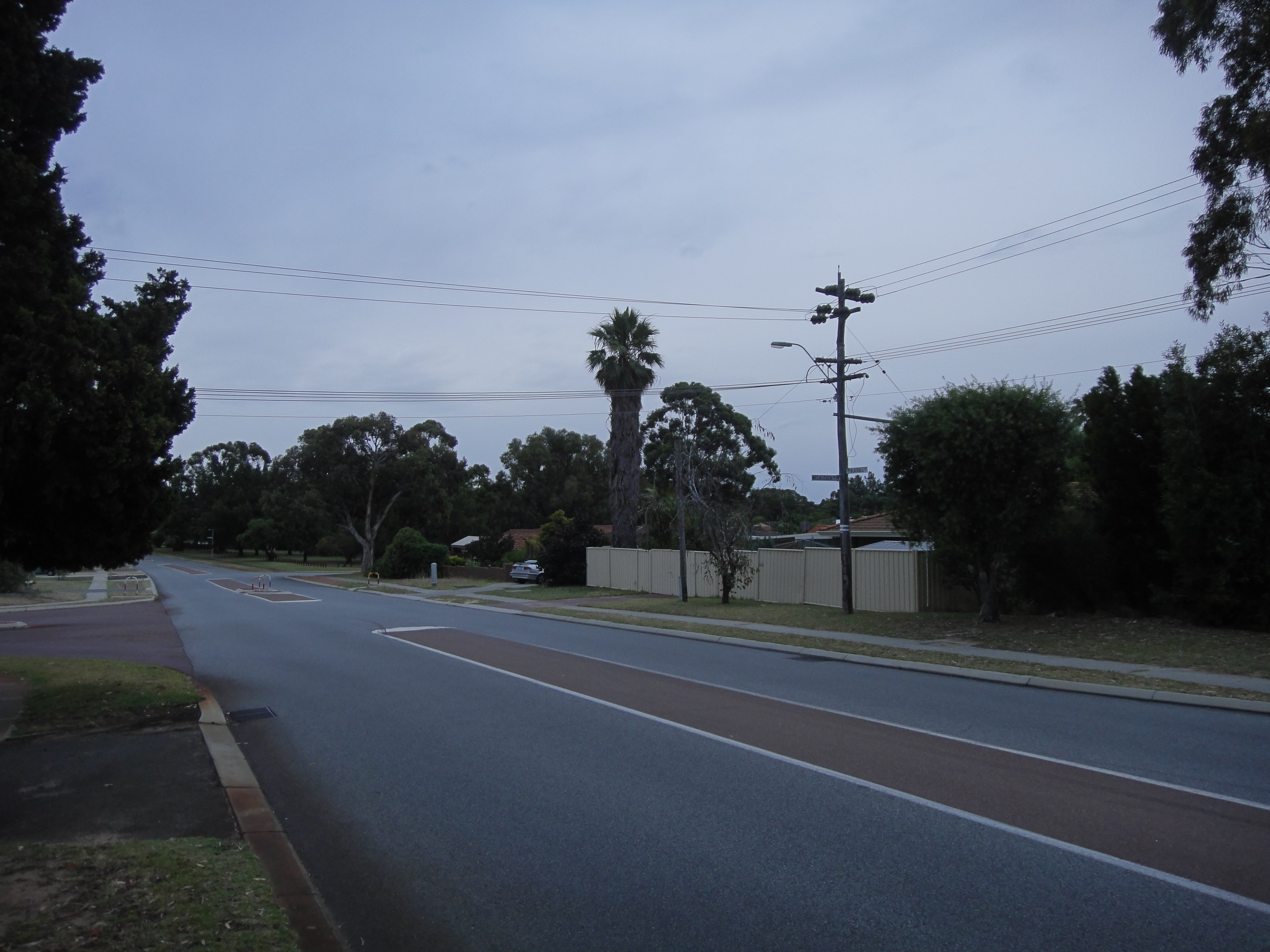
Typical western Greenwood outskirts streetscape

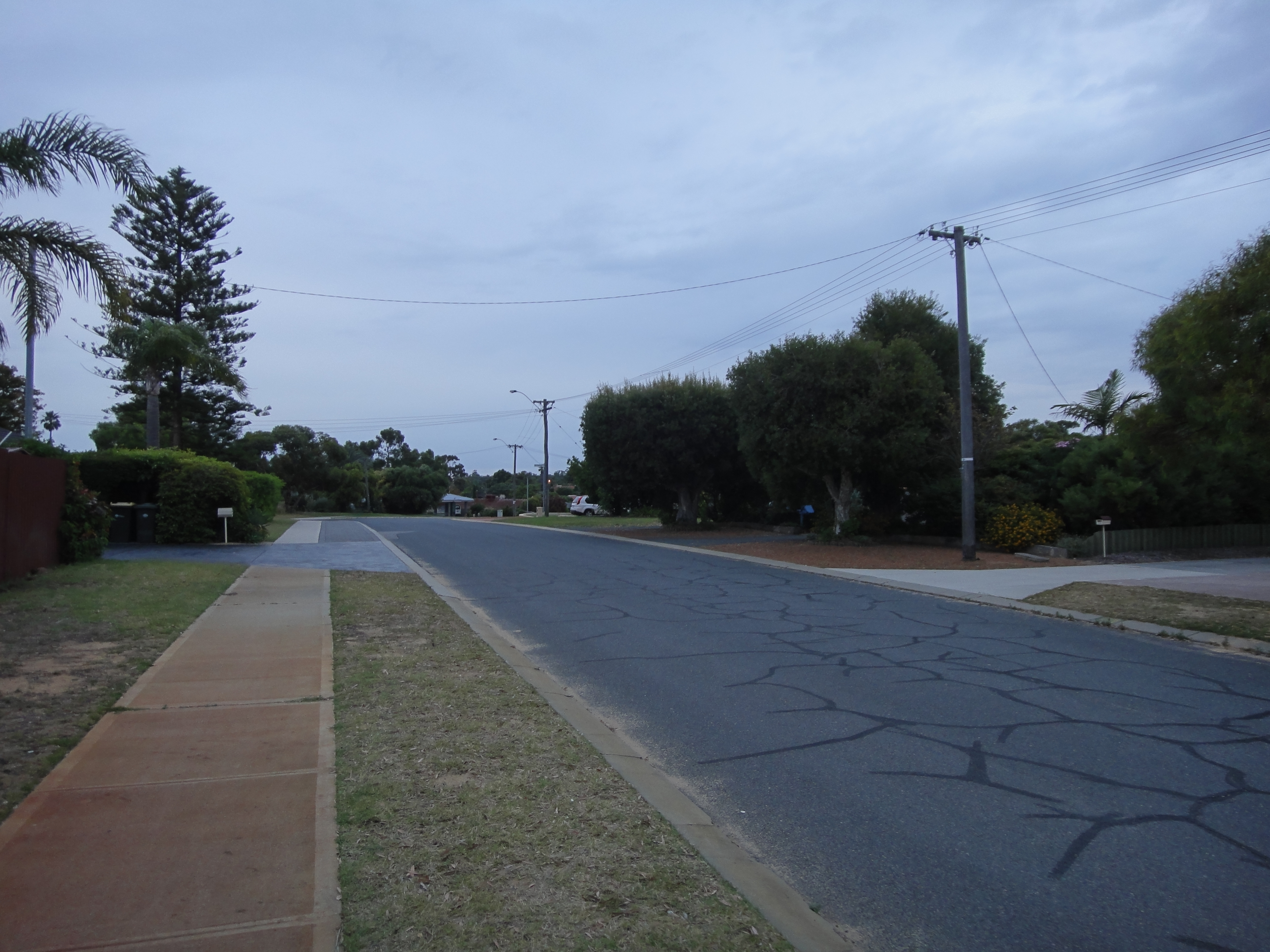
Typical central Greenwood streetscape
