= Greenwood College =

High school in Greenwood, Western Australia

Location
- 79 Coolibah Drive, Greenwood, Perth, Western Australia; Australia; 31°49′39″S 115°47′31″E

Information
- Former name: Greenwood Senior High School
- Type: Independent public co-educational high day school and intensive English centre
- Motto: Learn, Grow, Change (IDEAS Project)
- Established: 1 January 1976; 50 years ago
- School district: North Metro
- Educational authority: WA Department of Education
- School code: 4122
- Principal: Grant Brown
- Faculty: 106
- Teaching staff: 64
- Employees: 8 administrative staff; 34 support staff
- Years: 7–12 & USE (Note: Ungraded Secondary)
- Enrolment: 1,062 (2016)
  - Other: 57 (USE)
  - ESL: 60%
- International students: International fee paying (IFPS)
- Language: English; Japanese; French; Mandarin; Vietnamese; Other
- Campus type: Suburban
- Colors: Navy blue, red and white
- Sports: Cheerleading; Volleyball; Australian rules football
- Team name: Greenwood Titans; Greenwood College Volleyball; Greenwood Bulldogs
- Budget: $11.6 million (net recurrent income)
- Website: www.greenwood.wa.edu.au

Greenwood College (formerly Greenwood Senior High School) is an independent public co-educational high day school and Intensive English Centre, located in Greenwood, a northern suburb of Perth, Western Australia. The school caters for students from Year 7 to Year 12, Intensive English and USE students.

== History ==
Greenwood Senior High School was established in 1975 to serve the community of Greenwood. It is part of the Government of Western Australia's Department of Education Independent Public School (IPS) system. In 2012, it changed its name to Greenwood College as part of the IPS process.

== Co-curricular and extracurricular programs ==
The school offers a number of opportunities for enrolled students, including sports, co-curricular programs, and an aviation program.

=== Volleyball ===
Since 1995 the Physical Education Department has successfully promoted volleyball as an elite sport. Currently seventy Year 8 students are taking part in the first stage of the five year intensive volleyball program.

=== Aviation ===
The Greenwood College Aeronautics and Aviation program provides a foundation for further University, TAFE and ADFA courses related to aviation. Graduates from the Aeronautics program may gain credit points for the Aeronautics course at Edith Cowan University.

== International Program ==
The Greenwood College International Program has been gradually growing since its beginnings in 2007. Currently there are over 20 international students at the school who come from countries such as China, Japan, Thailand, Korea, Indonesia and Iran.

Students can choose to study in the Intensive English Center (IEC) or in the mainstream high school. Many students commence their studies in the IEC and then continue on in the mainstream to further their studies in Years 8 to 12.

== Intensive English Centre ==
The Intensive English Centre (IEC) was established at Greenwood in 2007 after moving from its former location at Perth Modern. The centre caters for the needs of students aged between 12 and 16 years of age, recent arrivals of migrant, refugee and international fee paying backgrounds in Western Australia from about 40 different national backgrounds and languages.

== Notable alumni ==
- Lisa McCune – four-time Gold Logie Award-winning Australian actress
- Reece Whitby – Labor MP and former journalist

== See also ==
- List of schools in the Perth metropolitan area
