= Woodvale, Western Australia =

Woodvale
- Suburb
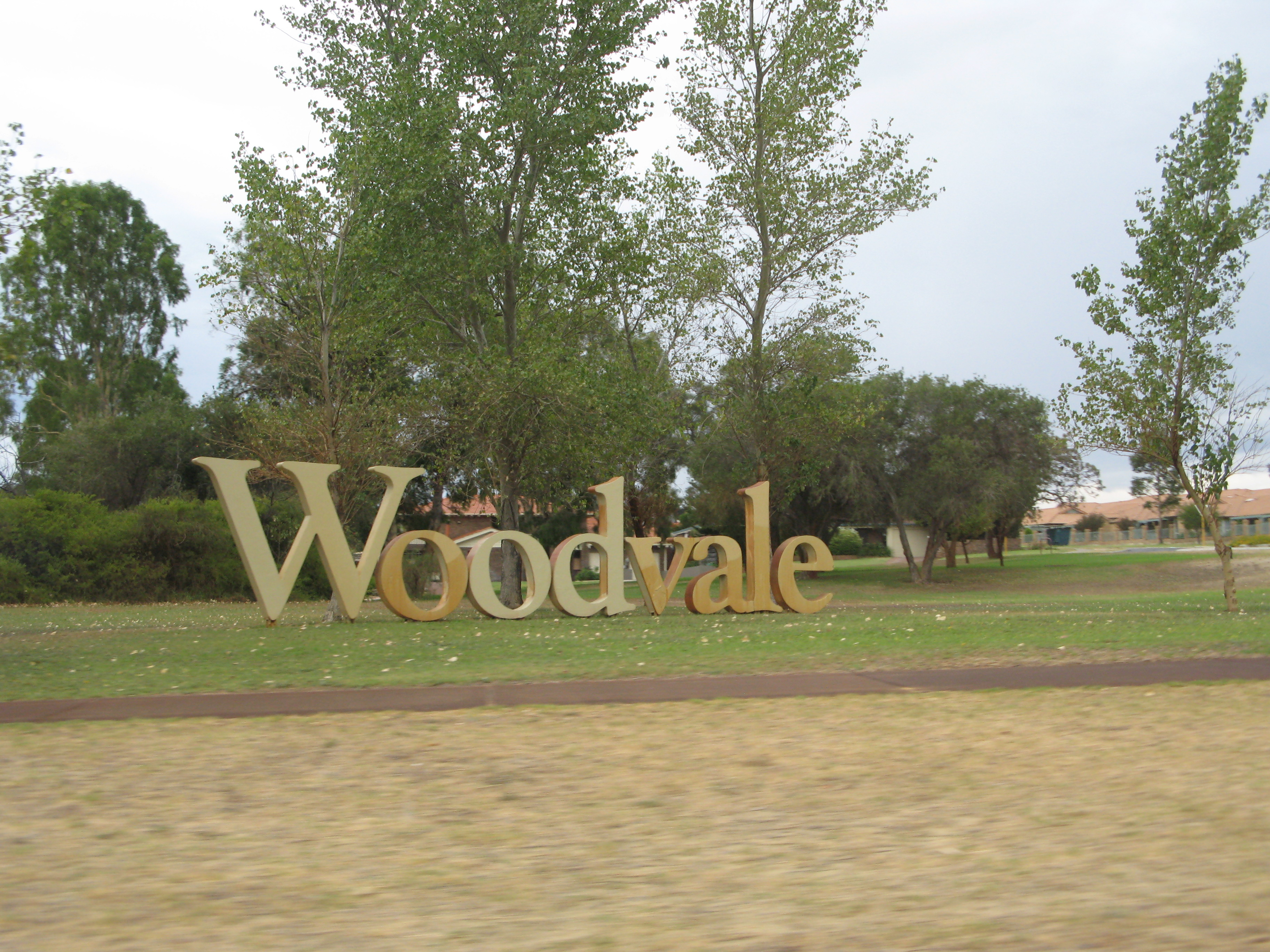
- Woodvale estate sign
- Interactive map of Woodvale
- Coordinates: 31.799°S 115.784°E
- Country: Australia
- State: Western Australia
- City: Perth
- LGAs: City of Joondalup; City of Wanneroo
- Location: 19 km (12 mi) N of Perth CBD
- Established: 1970s

Government
  - State electorate: Kingsley
  - Federal division: Moore
- Elevation: 37 m (121 ft)

Population
  - Total: 9,579 (SAL 2021)
- Postcode: 6026
Suburbs around Woodvale
Heathridge	Edgewater	Pearsall
Craigie	Woodvale	Wangara
Padbury	Kingsley	Madeley

Woodvale is a suburb of Perth, Western Australia, located within the City of Joondalup and the City of Wanneroo. At the 2021 census Woodvale had a population of 9,579.

Woodvale is bounded to the south by Whitfords Avenue, to the west by the Mitchell Freeway, to the north by Ocean Reef Road and to the east by Wanneroo Road. Trappers Drive runs through Woodvale, from Whitfords Avenue to Ocean Reef Road. The area within and around Woodvale was primarily rural until the late 1970s. Residential development began in 1979 and was completed by 1995 with the release of the Woodvale Waters housing estate. No farming properties remain in Woodvale.

Many immigrants have settled in Woodvale, with 15.8% of residents born in the British Isles and 3.5% born in South Africa, in both cases over twice the Western Australian average and over four times the Australian average.

== Transport ==
Woodvale is served by the 465, 466, 467, and 468 Transperth bus routes heading to either Whitfords Station or Joondalup Station. The 389 route via Wanneroo Road passes the Wanneroo Council area of Woodvale, divided by Yellagonga Wetlands. Local stations of Woodvale include Edgewater and Whitfords.

== Education ==
Woodvale contains a secondary school, Woodvale Secondary College, which opened in 1985, and three primary schools, Woodvale (1987), North Woodvale (1990) and St Luke's Catholic Primary School (1986).

== Politics ==
Prior to the inception of the City of Joondalup in 1998, Woodvale was part of the City of Wanneroo. In 1998 most of Woodvale was included in the City of Joondalup with a small portion between Yellagonga Regional Park and Wanneroo Road remaining within the City of Wanneroo. State and federal constituencies include the federal electorate of Moore and the state electorate of Kingsley. The federal and state seats are held by the centre-left Australian Labor Party.

== Notable residents ==
- Casey Dellacqua, tennis player and 2011 French Open mixed doubles champion.
- Graham Edwards, retired state and federal politician.
