= Greenwood railway station =

Railway station in Perth, Western Australia

Greenwood
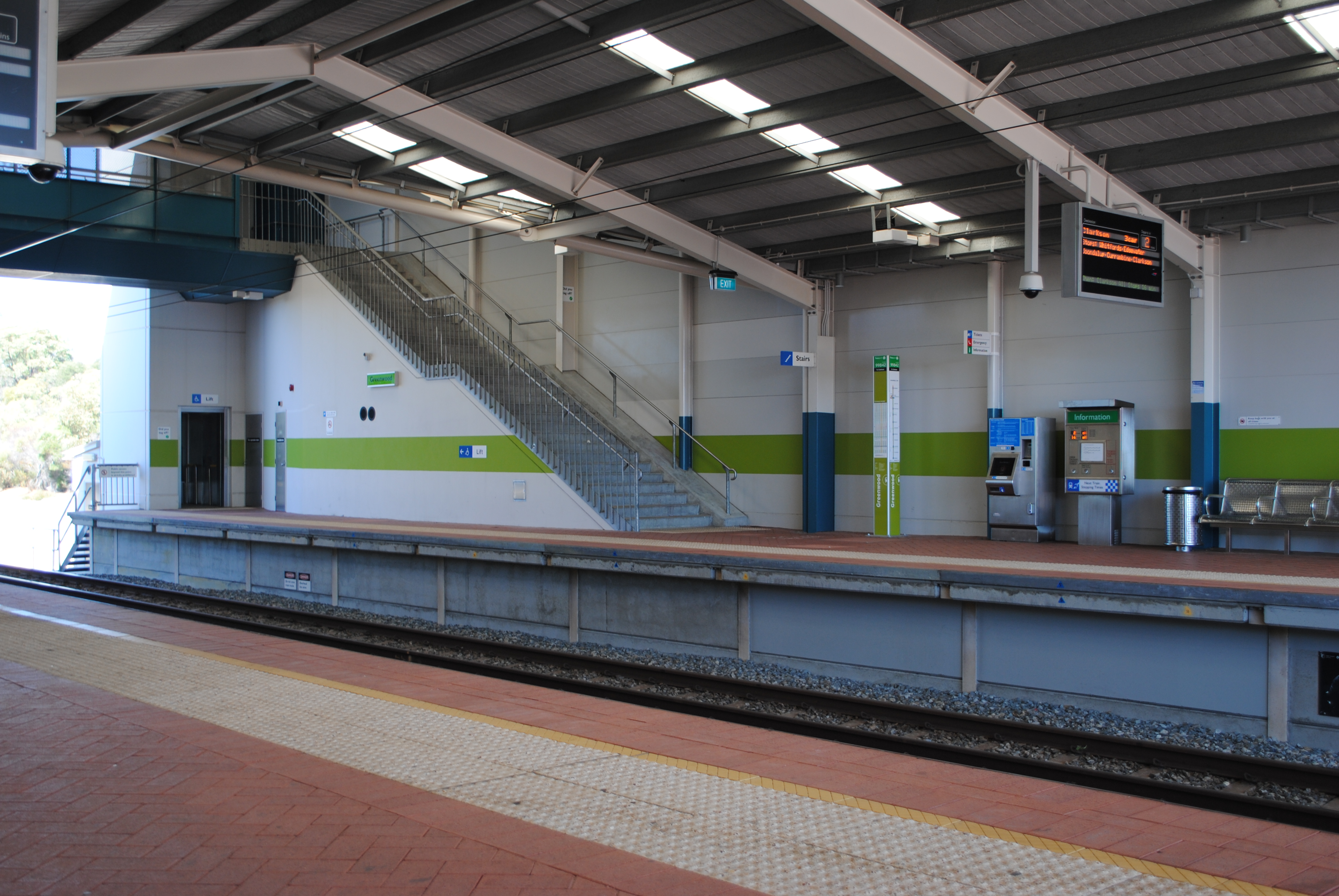
- Eastbound view from Platform 1, looking into Platform 2, March 2010

General information
- Location: Hepburn Avenue & Mitchell Freeway, Duncraig / Greenwood; Western Australia; Australia
- Coordinates: 31°49′03″S 115°47′01″E
- Operator: Public Transport Authority
- Line: Yanchep line
- Distance: 17.8 kilometres (11.1 mi) from Perth Underground
- Platforms: 2 side platforms
- Tracks: 2

Construction
- Accessible: Yes

Other information
- Fare zone: 2

History
- Opened: 29 January 2005

Passengers
- March 2018: 2,350 per day

Services
Preceding station	Transperth	Following station
Warwick towards Elizabeth Quay via Perth Underground	Yanchep line All, K	Whitfords towards Clarkson or Yanchep
Warwick towards Elizabeth Quay via Perth Underground	Yanchep line W	Whitfords Terminus
Location
- Location of Greenwood station

Greenwood railway station is a park and ride suburban railway station in Perth, Western Australia, within the suburbs of Duncraig and Greenwood. The station is on the Yanchep line and is part of the Transperth network. Located within the median strip of the Mitchell Freeway at an interchange with Hepburn Avenue, Greenwood station consists of two side platforms connected to a car park east of the freeway by a footbridge.

The station was included in early plans for the Joondalup line (now called the Yanchep line) in the 1980s, but the final plan for the Joondalup line, which opened in December 1992, did not include the construction of Greenwood station. After several promises by the state government during the 1990s to build the station, a A$6.8 million contract was awarded to John Holland Group in February 2004 to construct the station. Construction began in March 2004, and the station opened on 29 January 2005, relieving pressure on the car parks at Warwick and Whitfords stations.

Trains at Greenwood station run at a five-minute frequency during peak hour, lowering to a fifteen-minute frequency off-peak and on weekends and public holidays. At night, trains are half-hourly or hourly. The journey to Perth Underground station takes seventeen minutes. Until 2014, there was limited bus service at Greenwood station, including a route to Hillarys Boat Harbour, but since then, there have been no regular bus routes serving the station.

== Description ==
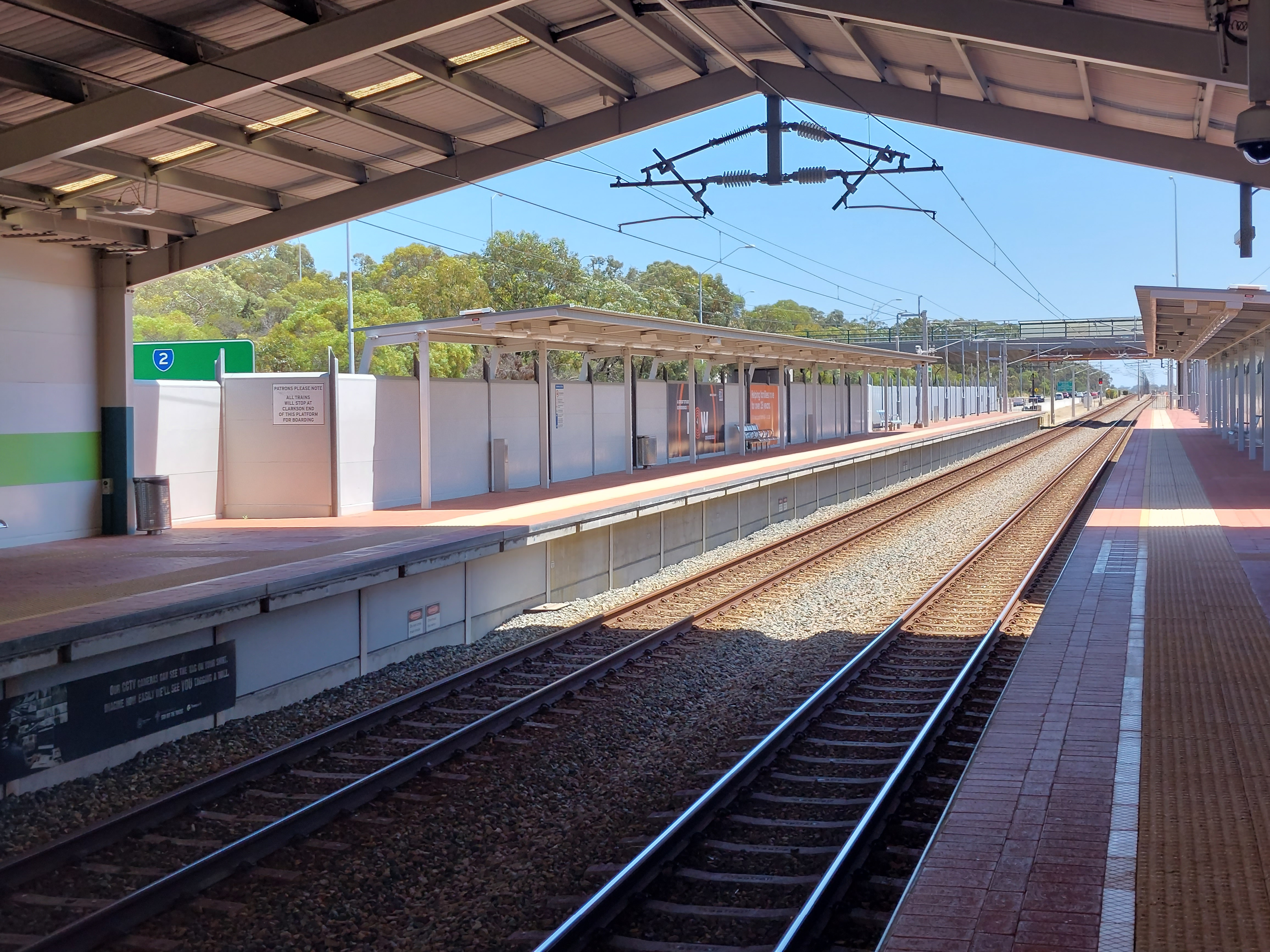
A view down the length of the platforms

Greenwood station is on the border of Duncraig and Greenwood, which are northern suburbs of Perth, Western Australia. The station is within the median strip of the Mitchell Freeway on the southern side of Hepburn Avenue. It is on the Yanchep line, which is part of the Transperth system, and is owned by the Public Transport Authority, a state government agency. The adjacent stations are Warwick station to the south and Whitfords station to the north. Greenwood station is 17.8 kilometres (11.1 mi) from Perth Underground station and is in fare zone two.

Greenwood station consists of two side platforms with a footbridge at the southern end linking the platforms to a car park on the eastern side of the freeway. The footbridge is connected to the platforms via stairs and lifts, and the station is fully disability accessible. The car park, which has 1,122 bays, is accessed via Hepburn Avenue and is within the diamond interchange between Hepburn Avenue and the Mitchell Freeway.

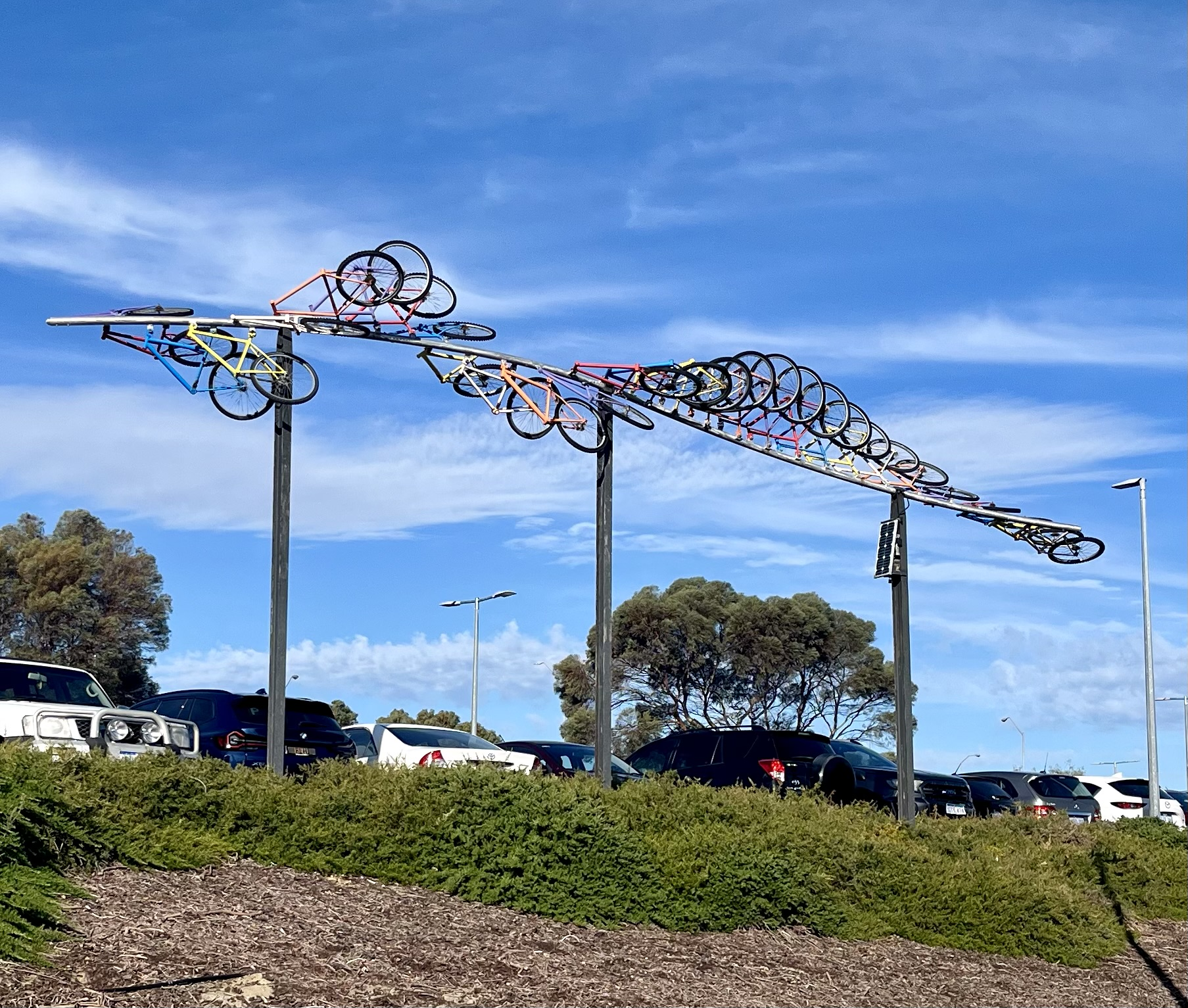
Bike Lab, by Jon Denaro

In 2011, an art piece was installed in the Greenwood station car park, named Bike Lab by Jon Denaro. It consists of a series of bicycles that were abandoned at train stations mounted on a pole elevated in the air.

== History ==
During the initial planning for the Joondalup line (now called the Yanchep line) in the 1980s, a station at Hepburn Avenue was originally considered, however the Northern Suburbs Transit System Master Plan, released in November 1989, determined that a station there would not be built initially and that provisions would be put in place for the station's construction at a later date. The Joondalup line ended up opening on 20 December 1992.

A study by the Department of Transport in 1996 found that demand for parking at Warwick and Whitfords stations was higher than expected, and recommended the preferred solution was building Greenwood station instead of expanding parking at Warwick or Whitfords stations, which would have cost more and been disruptive to passengers. The state Coalition government announced in December 1997 that Greenwood station would be constructed by June 1999 as the first infill station on the Joondalup line. A second announcement in March 1999 put the station's opening date at May 2000, and in June 1999, the government revealed the station's design and said that construction would be underway in July 1999, but by December 1999, construction had not begun. The Currambine to Butler Extension Master Plan, released in June 2000, said that the construction of Greenwood station should be delayed to coincide with the extension of the Joondalup line to Clarkson, scheduled to open in 2003, due to the additional rolling stock required for the station to open.

Track relocation for Greenwood station began in July 2003, requiring a weekend closure of the Joondalup line between Stirling and Whitfords stations. The track works fell under a contract for the extension of the Joondalup line to Clarkson station. The contractor was a consortium of Barclay Mowlem and Alstom. In October 2003, tenders were called for, and in February 2004, the A$6.8 million contract to build the station was awarded to John Holland Group after some design changes to allow for bus services to the station. Construction of the station began in March 2004, and on 29 January 2005, the station was opened by Premier Geoff Gallop and the minister for planning and infrastructure, Alannah MacTiernan.

In 2010, the Greenwood station's car park was expanded to the northern side of Hepburn Avenue with 176 new bays, downscaled from an earlier plan for 691 additional parking bays. In 2017, the station's platform shelter was extended north for $1.8 million, making 60 percent of the platforms sheltered. The shelter was installed using a crane at night time over five days during June and July 2017, closing one lane of the Mitchell Freeway each time. Before the shelter extension, only a short part of the southern end of the platforms were sheltered.

For the 2021 state election, the Labor government committed to building a $38 million, 700 bay, multi-storey car park at Greenwood station by 2024 as part of the Metronet project. The car park was to replace the southern end of the existing car park and take the total parking capacity of Greenwood station to 1,600 cars. Tenders were called for the design and construction of the car park in April 2023.

== Services ==
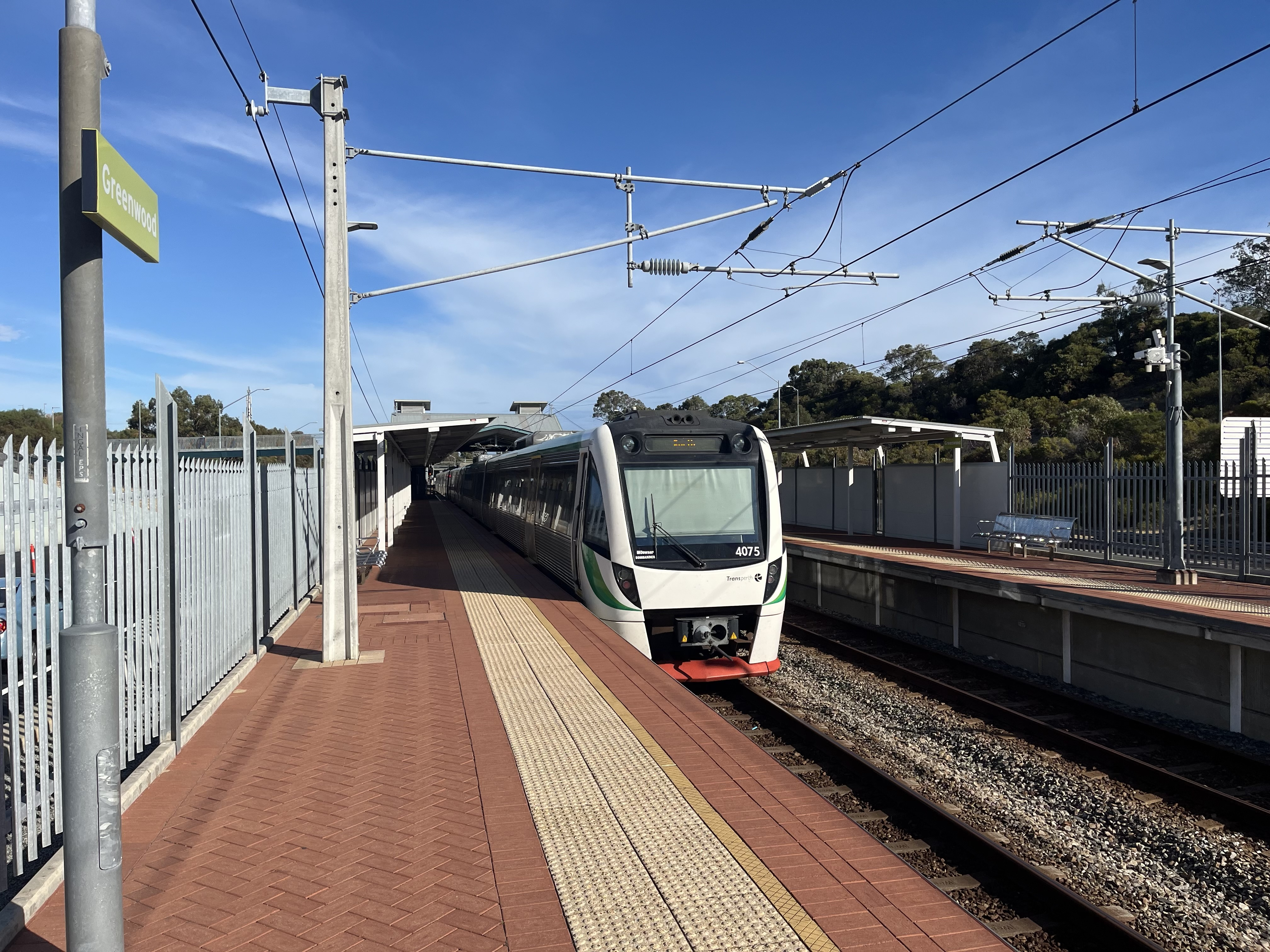
A Transperth B-series train at Greenwood station

Greenwood station is served by Yanchep line services, which travel between Elizabeth Quay station in the Perth central business district, and Yanchep station to the north. These services are operated by the Public Transport Authority.

During peak hour, full line services stop at Greenwood station every ten minutes and services from Elizabeth Quay to Whitfords or Clarkson stop at the station every ten minutes, making for a five-minute frequency in total. Off peak and for weekends and public holidays, trains are every fifteen minutes. At night, trains are half-hourly or hourly. The journey to Perth Underground station takes seventeen minutes.

Before it opened, Greenwood station was expected to have up to 2,600 passengers per weekday. In the 2013–14 financial year, the station had 611,508 boardings. In 2017, the station had approximately 2,200 boardings per weekday, and in March 2018, the station had approximately 2,350 boardings per day, making it the third least used Joondalup line station. In 2023, the station had fewer than 1,500 boardings per day, which the government hoped to increase to 4,000 by 2031.

From its opening, Greenwood station had one bus service: route 456, which ran to Hillarys Boat Harbour on weekends and public holidays. From February 2012, a six-month trial bus service, route 451, from Greenwood station to Kingsway City Shopping Centre began. The trial was extended by another six months, but the service ended in April 2013 due to insufficient patronage. Upon the end of route 451, route 456 was upgraded to run every day of the week. In May 2014, route 456 was completely withdrawn, ending all bus services to Greenwood station except for rail replacement bus services.
