= Bassendean =

- Suburb
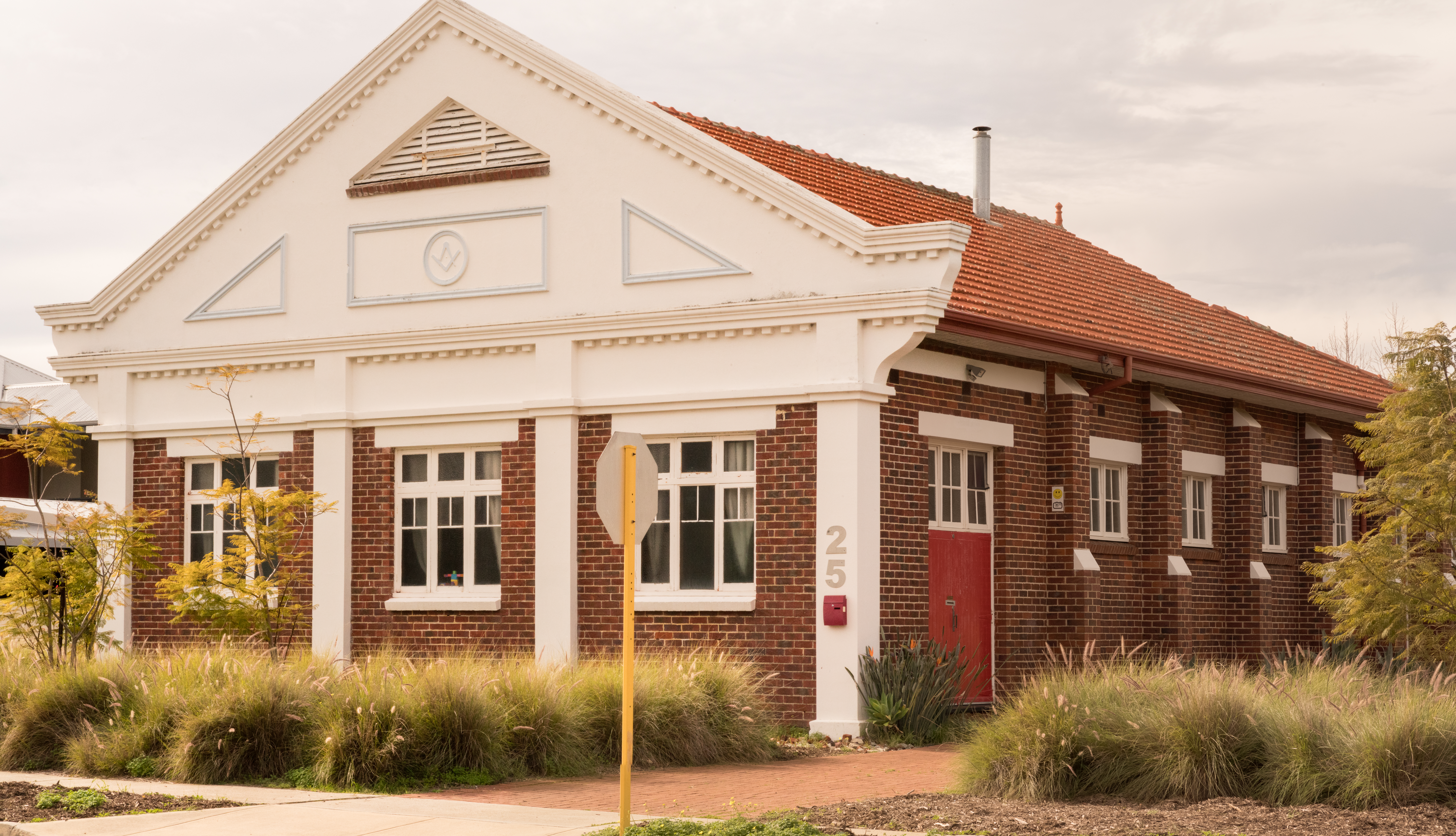
- The heritage listed Bassendean Masonic Lodge
- Interactive map of Bassendean
- Coordinates: 31.905°S 115.949°E
- Country: Australia
- State: Western Australia
- City: Perth
- LGA: Town of Bassendean
- Location: 12 km (7.5 mi) from Perth

Government
  - State electorate: Bassendean
  - Federal division: Hasluck

Area
  - Total: 7.3 km^{2} (2.8 sq mi)

Population
  - Total: 10,837 (SAL 2021)
- Postcode: 6054
Suburbs around Bassendean
Morley	Eden Hill	Caversham
Bayswater	Bassendean	Guildford
Ashfield	Ascot	South Guildford

Bassendean (once referred to as West Guildford) is a north-eastern suburb of Perth, Western Australia. Its local government area is the Town of Bassendean.

It is also the name of the sand dune system on the Swan Coastal Plain known as the Bassendean Dune System.

== History ==
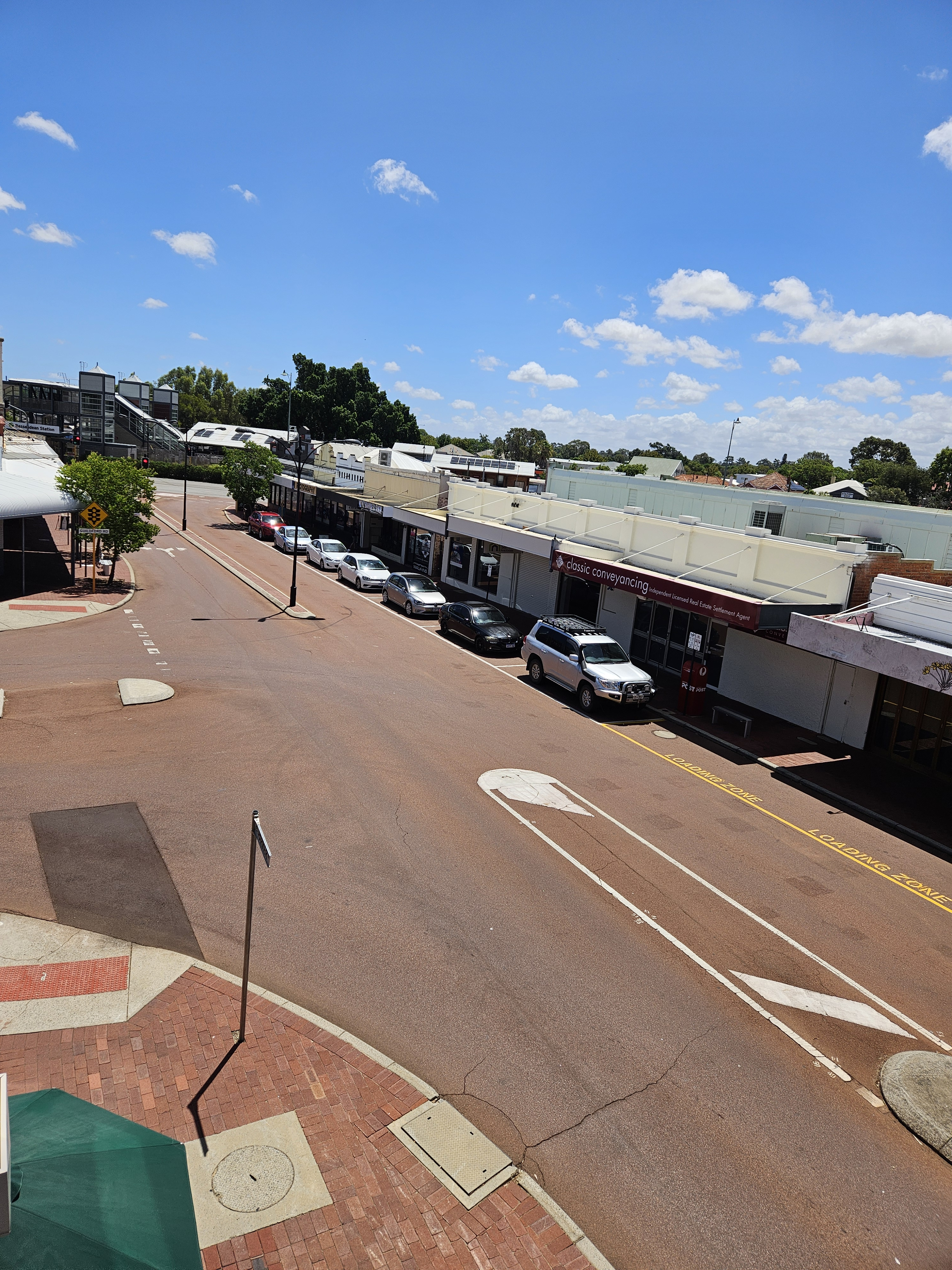
Old Perth Road, Bassendean in February 2026

Success Hill, overlooking the Swan River, was a meeting place and site of significance to the Noongar people. In Noongar mythology it was associated with Wagyl and swimming in the adjoining portion of the river was considered impermissible "out of respect and fear of the water spirit who lived beneath the surface".

In 1829, the land along the Swan River was allotted to British settlers as they arrived in the newly created Swan River Colony. James Henty and his brothers were granted 2,000 acres upon which they grazed their livestock and built a mud-brick homestead. They called their property Stoke Farm. In 1832, the Henty brothers sold the farm to the Colonial Secretary, Peter Broun who renamed the homestead Bassendean.

Over the years the Bassendean property became incorporated into the suburb of West Guildford and in 1922, West Guildford was renamed Bassendean. Flooding in 1929 caused severe damage, especially to the primary school oval.

In December 1934, Bassendean Road Board held a referendum, seeking approval to borrow funds for the improvement of an area, known as Hays Swamp, on the edge of the townsite. The development would include a bowling green with floodlights, a croquet lawn, Bassendean Oval, tennis courts and provisions for other sports.

== Rail heritage ==
Bassendean is home to the Western Australian Rail Transport Museum which opened in 1974. The display has a collection of steam and diesel locomotives, some of which have been restored to operational condition. Also as part of the collection are a number of carriages and other equipment associated including the Zanthus station and a signal box from Perth station. The West Australian Model Railway Club is also housed within the complex. The display's centrepiece is a working scale model featuring engine characters from the children's series Thomas the Tank Engine and Friends.

== Facilities ==
Old Perth Road forms part of Bassendean's town centre. Prior to the 1970s, it was part of Guildford Road.

Cyril Jackson Senior High School was built in 1962, and was converted into Cyril Jackson Senior Campus in 1990 to provide specialised study for post high school students gaining entrance into university study. Bassendean railway station is served by Transperth Midland line services.

In 1977, Bassendean Village Shopping complex opened on land bordered by Guildford Road, Whitfield Street, West Road and Old Perth Road. As at January 2024, the centre's name was Hawaiian's Bassendean.

== Transport ==
=== Bus ===
- 45 Bassendean Town Centre to Bayswater Station – serves Parker Street, James Street, Old Perth Road, Devon Road, North Road, Hyland Street, West Road, Reid Street and Kenny Street
- 47 Bassendean Station to Morley Station – serves Scaddan Street and Collier Road
- 355 Galleria Bus Station to Whiteman Park Station – serves Grey Street, Broadway, Bassendean Station and Ivanhoe Street
- 356 Galleria Bus Station to Ballajura Station – serves Walter Road East, Penzance Street, Broadway, Bassendean Station and Ivanhoe Street
- 357 Bassendean Station to Whiteman Park Station – serves Railway Parade and Lord Street

=== Rail ===
- Midland Line
  - Ashfield Station
  - Bassendean Station
  - Success Hill Station

== Industry ==
Bassendean has had an involvement in railway rolling stock construction and maintenance since Commonwealth Engineering opened a plant in 1951. It closed in the 1980s, with Goninan later taking it over.

== Notable people ==
- Peter Broun (1797–1846), first Colonial Secretary of Western Australia
- Margaret Forrest (1844–1929), wife of Premier John Forrest
- Pat Giles (1928–2017), ALP Senator during the Hawke and Keating governments
- Deborah Vernon Hackett (1887–1965), mining company director and philanthropist
- Rolf Harris (1930–2023), Australian-British entertainer and child sex offender, known as the "boy from Bassendean"
- James Henty (1800–1882), pioneer British colonist of the area
- May Holman (1893–1939), politician, the first woman Australian Labor Party parliamentarian
- Adem K, musician of the band Turnstyle has lived in Bassendean since 2001
- Jon Stockman, musician from Karnivool lives in Bassendean

== See also ==
- Town of Bassendean
