= Bassendean railway station =

Railway station in Perth, Western Australia

Bassendean
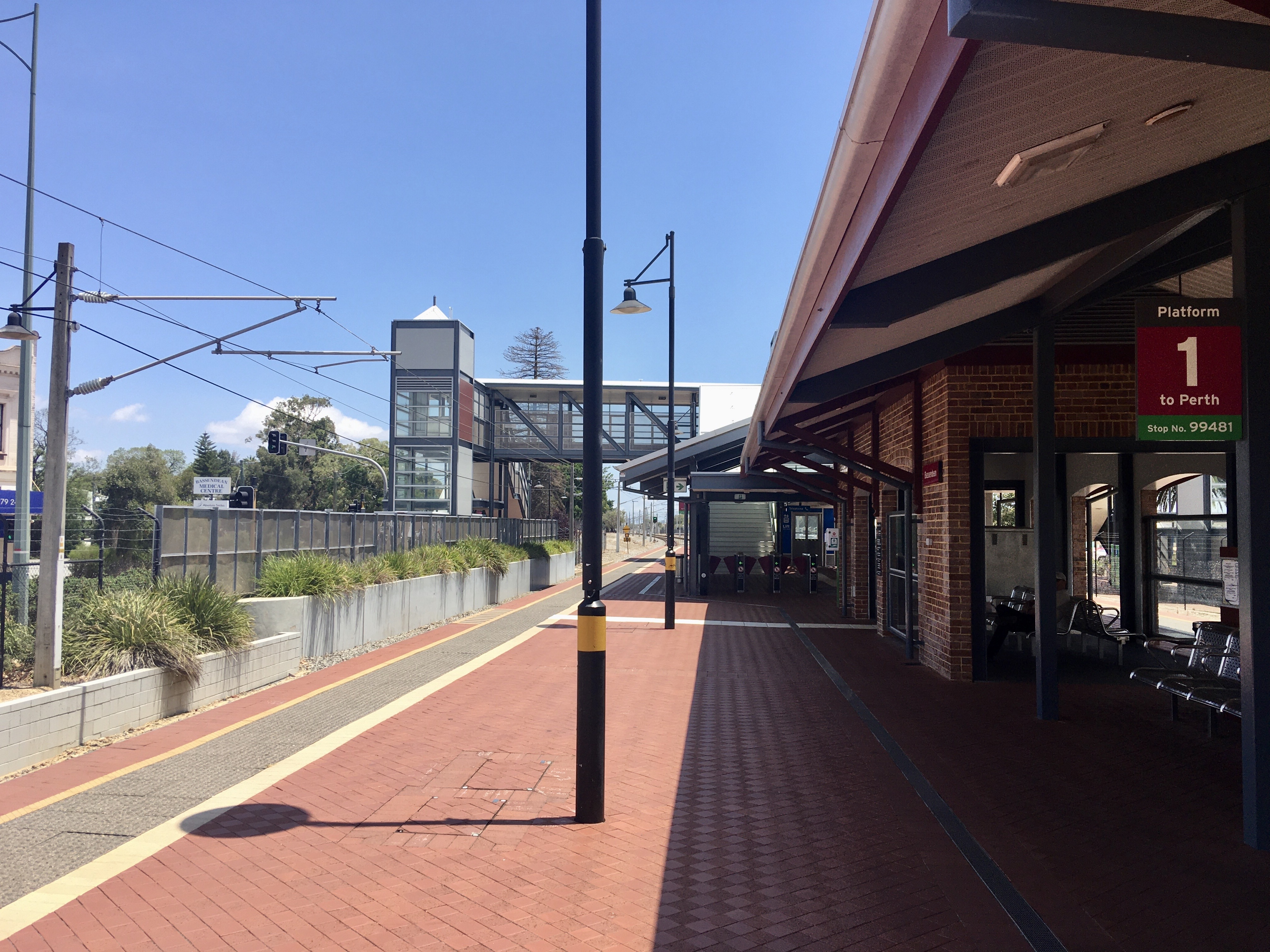
- South-west bound view from Platform 1, December 2022

General information
- Location: Guildford Road, Railway Parade, Kenny Street, Broadway; Bassendean; Western Australia; Australia
- Coordinates: 31°54′11″S 115°56′49″E
- Owner: Public Transport Authority
- Operator: Transperth Trains
- Line: Midland line
- Distance: 10.8 km (6.7 mi) from Perth
- Platforms: 2 (1 island)

Construction
- Structure type: Closed Station
- Cycle facilities: Bike shelter

Other information
- Station code: MBN
- Fare zone: 2

History
- Opened: 1910
- Former names: West Guildford

Passengers
- 2013–14: 793,718

Services
| Preceding station | Transperth | Following station |
|---|---|---|
| Ashfield towards Perth | Midland line | Success Hill towards Midland |
Location
- Location of Bassendean railway station

Bassendean railway station is a Transperth station located in Bassendean, 10.8 kilometres (6.7 mi) north-east of Perth railway station, on the Midland Line.

== History ==
In August 1906 a deputation from the West Guildford Roads Board spoke with the Minister for Railways JW Langsford, the minister was under the impression that the group were there to push for a station halfway between Guildford and Bayswater stations. The Minister explained that the Commissioner Mr George was opposed to a station at that location. Mr Georges had found that there was a requirement for a station one mile from Guildford and that the Commissioner would visit the spot to see for himself. In July 1907 sort another deputation from the Roads Board, local MLA Mr Johnson said he had already spoken with the Minister for railways who had agreed to visit the district.

The station opened in 1910 as West Guildford, being renamed in 1922. Upgrade works commenced in 2003 with the original building demolished and replaced at a cost of $5 million. On 31 May 2004, the upgraded station was opened by state Minister for Planning and Infrastructure Alannah MacTiernan. It is a part of the Public Transport Authority's Building Better Stations program.

From 22 January until 22 February 2026, Bassendean station served as the temporary terminus of the Midland Line whilst works were undertaken at Midland to complete the new station.

== Rail services ==
Bassendean railway station is served by the Midland railway line on the Transperth network. This line goes between Midland railway station and Perth railway station. Midland line trains stop at the station every 12 minutes during peak on weekdays, and every 15 minutes during the day outside peak every day of the year except Christmas Day. Trains are half-hourly or hourly at night time. The station saw 793,718 passengers in the 2013-14 financial year.

From 22 January to 22 February

Bassendean platform arrangement
| Stop ID | Platform | Line | Service Pattern | Destination | Via | Notes |
|---|---|---|---|---|---|---|
| 99481 | 1 | Midland line | All stations | Perth | | |
| 99482 | 2 | Midland line | All stations | Midland | | |

== Bus routes ==
| Stop | Route | Destination / description | Notes |
|---|---|---|---|
| Stand 1 | 47 | to Morley railway station, Perth via Collier Road | |
| Stand 1 | 355 | to Galleria bus station via Broadway and Collier Road | |
| Stand 1 | 356 | to Galleria bus station via Walter Road East and Broun Avenue | |
| Stand 1 | 901 | Rail Replacement Service to Perth | |
| Stand 1 | 654 | to Perth Stadium, Burswood | |
| Stand 2 | 355 | to Whiteman Park railway station via Altone Road and Marshall Road | |
| Stand 3 | 356 | to Ballajura railway station via Sturtridge Road, Benara Road, Maguire Avenue, Altone Road, Bennet Springs Drive and Beechboro Road North | |
| Stand 4 | 357 | to Whiteman Park railway station via Lord Street and Arthur Street | |
| Stand 4 | 901 | Rail Replacement Service to Midland | |

Additionally, bus route 45 to Bayswater railway station, Perth terminates on the town side of the station on Parker Street.

== See also ==
- Path Transit
- Swan Transit
