= Ashfield, Western Australia =

Ashfield
- Suburb
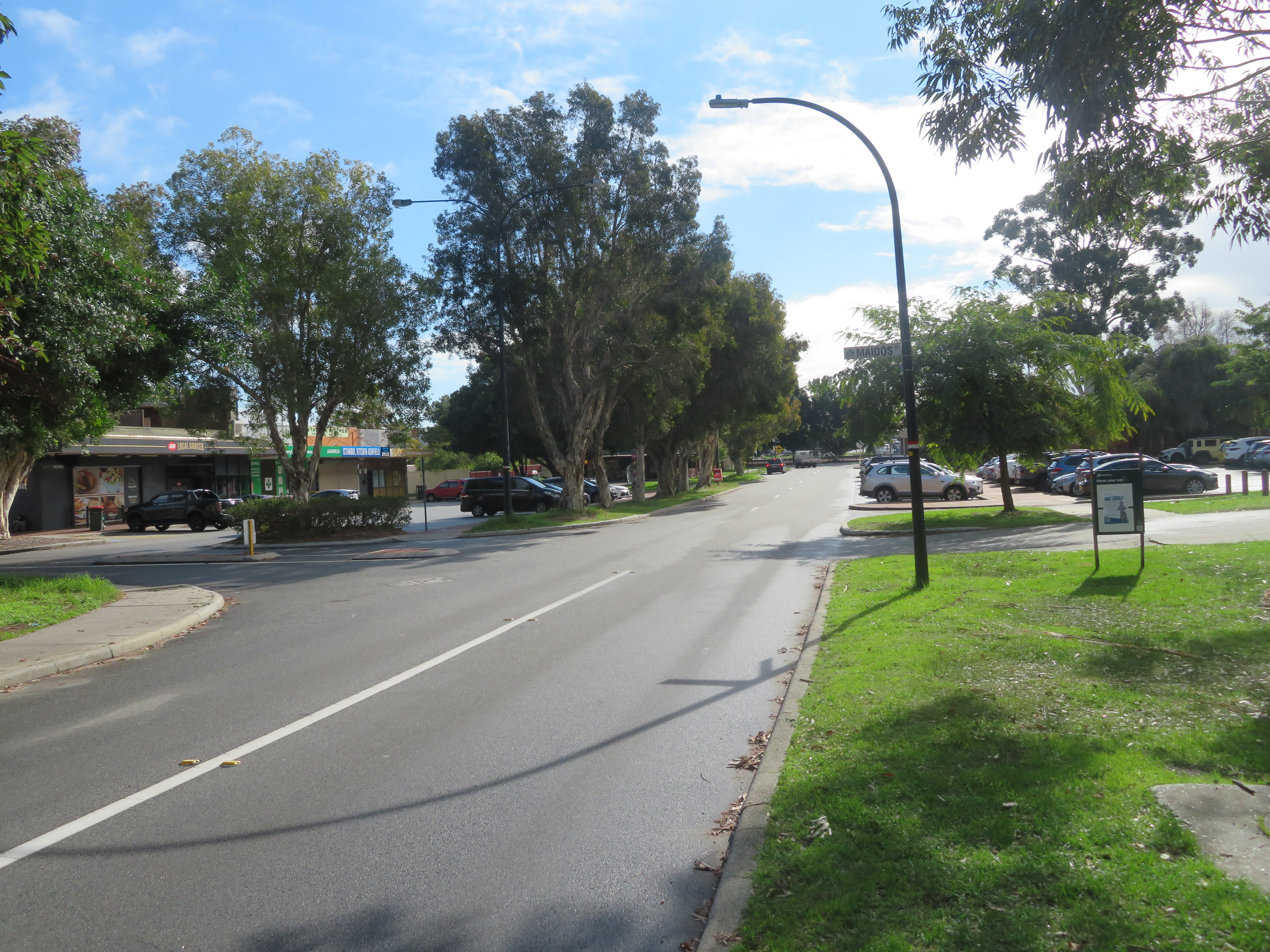
- Colstoun Road in Ashfield, facing Railway Parade
- Interactive map of Ashfield
- Coordinates: 31.917°S 115.938°E
- Country: Australia
- State: Western Australia
- City: Perth
- LGA: Town of Bassendean
- Location: 10 km (6.2 mi) from Perth; 8 km (5.0 mi) from Midland

Government
  - State electorate: Bassendean
  - Federal division: Perth

Area
  - Total: 0.7 km^{2} (0.27 sq mi)

Population
  - Total: 1,395 (SAL 2021)
- Postcode: 6054
Suburbs around Ashfield
Bayswater	Bassendean	Bassendean
Bayswater	Ashfield	Bassendean
Redcliffe	Redcliffe	South Guildford

Ashfield is a residential suburb of Perth, Western Australia in the Town of Bassendean. The suburb is located along the Swan River. The Midland line passes through the suburb and it is serviced by the Ashfield railway station.

It is home to Ashfield Reserve, which also contains Ashfield Arena. It also contains Ashfield Flats, the largest river flat remaining in the Perth metropolitan area.

The housing was originally established as a small collection of railway houses near the train line. In the late 1950s early 1960s the area experienced a small boom of housing (400 houses) mostly built by the then State Housing Commission partly funded by the sale of half the properties to individuals. In the late 1960s the State Housing started to reacquire some of those properties. During the late 1990s the suburb underwent a revamp driven by the State Housing Commission, now called the Department of Housing. This occurred in conjunction with the infill sewage project which was created to convert Perth homes from septic tanks and leach drains to mains sewage. They bulldozed houses on land where they had adjoining properties. For every three houses removed five to seven were built in their place. The majority of these were sold off to low income and first home buyers.

Public housing in Ashfield makes up 14.5% of total residences, and is evenly distributed. From 2011 to 2021, the proportion of public housing decreased by 2.7%.

The Department of Housing still owns about 22% of the houses (as opposed to their stated goal of 10%), and uses their housing stock as subsidised rental accommodation.

The deepest point of the Swan River upstream from Melville Water occurs in Ashfield. It was in this area the farthest upstream recording of sharks occurred with one being caught in the late 1970s.

== Schools ==
Ashfield has one primary school located inside called Ashfield Primary School and the closest high school is Cyril Jackson Senior Campus.

== Transport ==
=== Bus ===
- 45 Bayswater Station to Bassendean Town Centre – serves Hardy Road, French Street, Margaret Street and Fisher Street

=== Rail ===
- Midland Line
  - Ashfield Station
