= Woodbridge railway station, Perth =

Railway station in Perth, Western Australia

Woodbridge
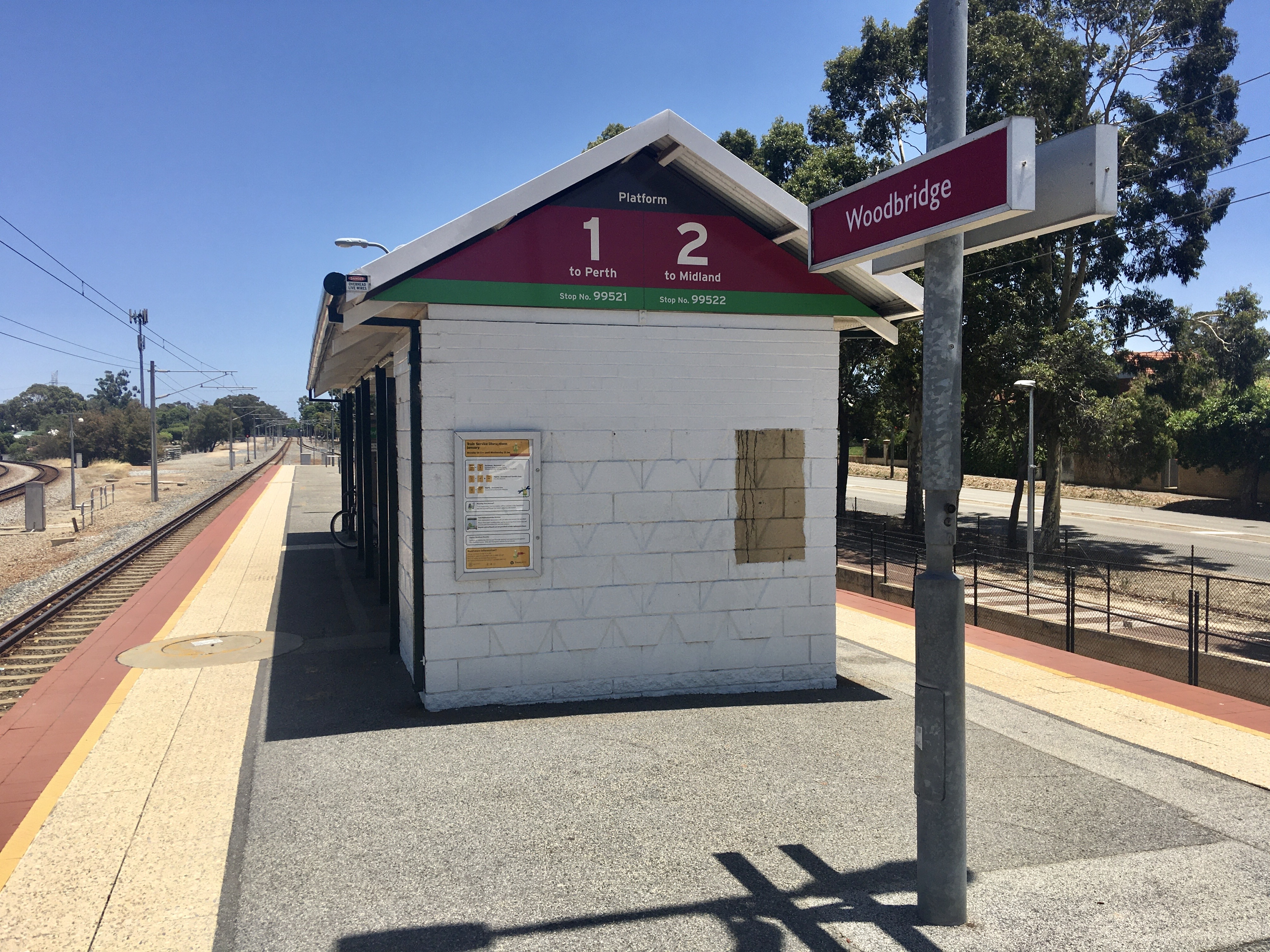
- Westbound view from Platform 1, showing station building on island platform, December 2022

General information
- Location: Great Eastern Highway; Woodbridge
- Coordinates: 31°53′29″S 115°59′34″E
- Owner: Public Transport Authority
- Operator: Transperth Trains
- Line: Midland line
- Distance: 15.5 km (9.6 mi) from Perth
- Platforms: 2 (1 island)

Construction
- Structure type: Open station

Other information
- Station code: MWM
- Fare zone: 2

History
- Opened: 1903
- Former names: West Midland

Passengers
- 2013–14: 61,138

Services
Preceding station	Transperth	Following station
East Guildford towards Perth	Midland line	Midland Terminus
Location
- Location of Woodbridge railway station

Woodbridge railway station is located on the Midland line in Perth, 15.5 kilometres from Perth station.

== History ==
Woodbridge station opened in 1903 as West Midland, being renamed on 3 October 2004. It stands close to where the original Midland Junction station was located, with the original buildings shifted to Greenmount station in 1971.

== Rail services ==
Woodbridge railway station is served by the Midland railway line on the Transperth network. This line goes between Midland railway station and Perth railway station. Midland line trains stop at the station every 10 minutes during peak on weekdays, and every 15 minutes during the day outside peak every day of the year except Christmas Day. Trains are half-hourly or hourly at nighttime. The station saw 61,138 passengers in the 2013-14 financial year.

=== Platforms ===
Woodbridge platform arrangement
Stop ID	Platform	Line	Service Pattern	Destination	Via	Notes
99521	1	Midland line	All stations	Perth		
99522	2	Midland line	All stations	Midland		

== Bus routes ==
Stop	Route	Destination / description	Notes
Great Eastern Highway (west bound)	290	to Redcliffe Station via James Street and Johnson Street	
Great Eastern Highway (west bound)	901	Rail replacement service to Perth	
Great Eastern Highway (east bound)	290	to Midland station	
Great Eastern Highway (east bound)	901	Rail replacement service to Midland station	
