= East Guildford railway station =

Railway station in Perth, Western Australia

East Guildford
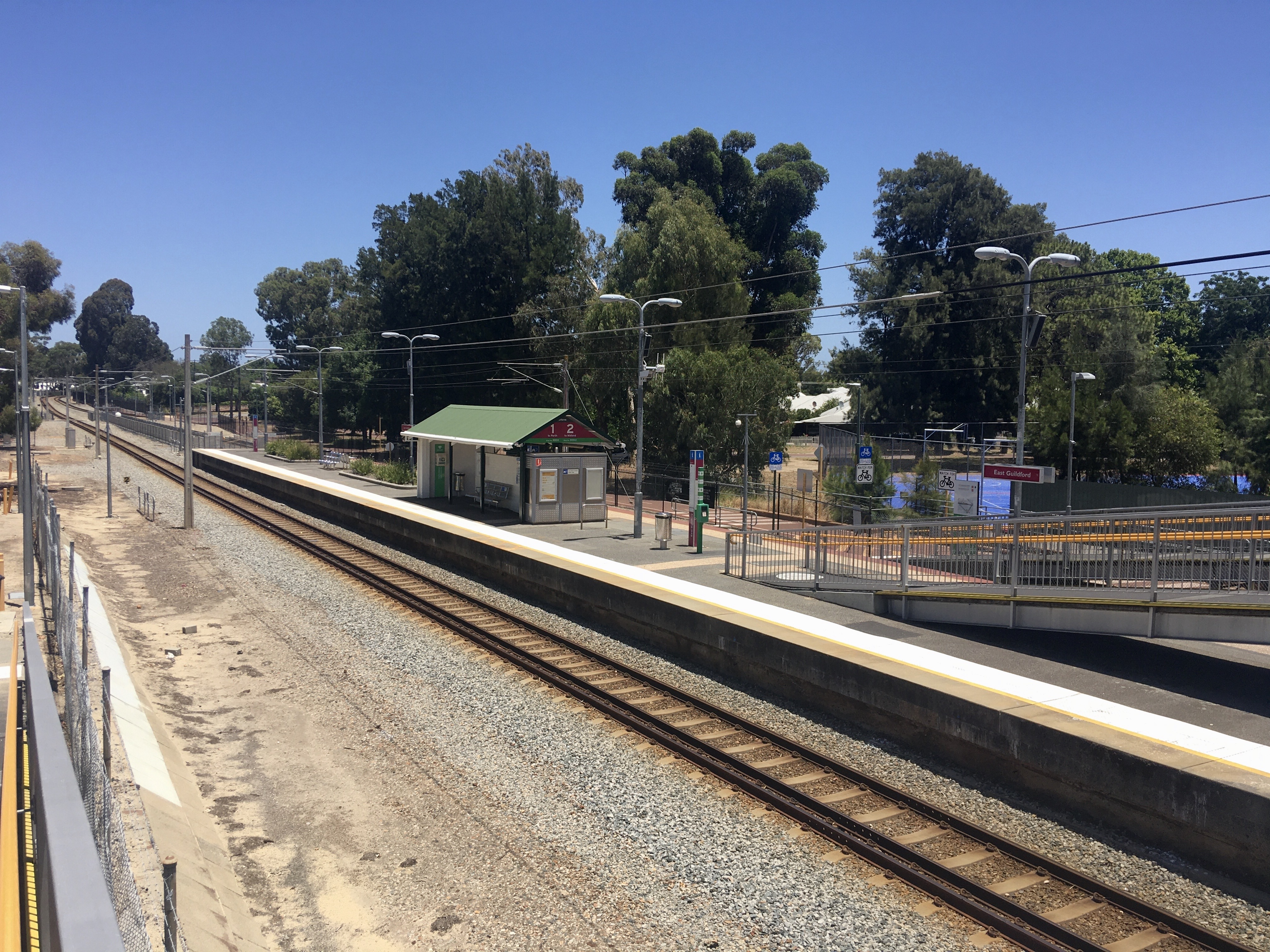
- North-west bound view of Platform 1, viewed from the station footbridge, December 2022

General information
- Location: Swan Street, Fauntleroy Street, Allpike Street; Guildford
- Coordinates: 31°53′47″S 115°58′48″E
- Owner: Public Transport Authority
- Operator: Transperth Trains
- Line: Midland line
- Distance: 14 km (8.7 mi) from Perth
- Platforms: 2 (1 island)

Construction
- Structure type: Open Station

Other information
- Station code: MEG
- Fare zone: 2

History
- Opened: 13 July 1896
- Former names: Woodbridge

Passengers
- 2013–14: 84,415

Services
Preceding station	Transperth	Following station
Guildford towards Perth	Midland line	Woodbridge towards Midland
Location
- Location of East Guildford railway station

East Guildford railway station is a Transperth railway station 14 km from Perth railway station, in Western Australia, on the Midland Line.

== History ==
The station opened on 13 July 1896 as Woodbridge and served the Royal Agricultural Society's Woodbridge Showgrounds. It was renamed East Guildford on 1 April 1908. Since the change was at the request of the Guildford Municipal Council, the council was charged £35 5s 6d for the cost of changing the name on tickets and station signboards. The station was remodelled in the late 1960s.

== Rail services ==
The Midland railway line serves East Guildford railway station on the Transperth network. This line goes between Midland railway station and Perth railway station. Midland line trains stop at the station every 10 minutes during peak on weekdays, and every 15 minutes during the day outside peak every day of the year except Christmas Day. Trains are half-hourly or hourly at night. The station saw 84,415 passengers in the 2013-14 financial year.

=== Platforms ===
East Guildford platform arrangement
Stop ID	Platform	Line	Service Pattern	Destination	Via	Notes
99511	1	Midland line	All stations	Perth		
99512	2	Midland line	All stations	Midland		

== Bus routes ==
Stop	Route	Destination / description	Notes
East Street (north bound)	290	to Midland Train Station via Great Eastern Highway	
East Street (north bound)	901	Train replacement service to Midland	
East Street (south bound)	290	to Redcliffe Station via Great Eastern Highway	
East Street (south bound)	901	Train replacement service to Perth	
