= Woodbridge, Western Australia =

Woodbridge
- Suburb
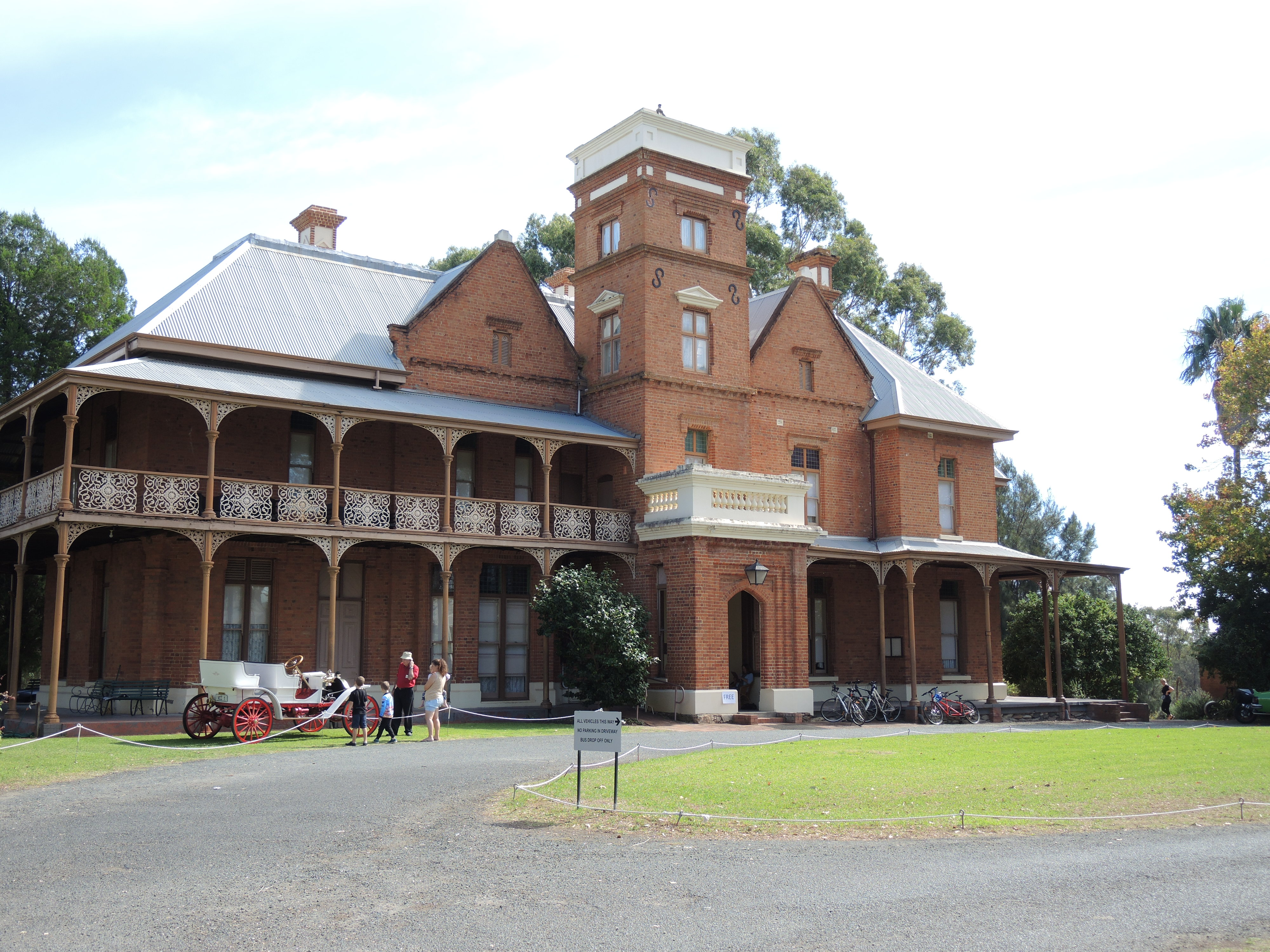
- Front of Woodbridge House
- Interactive map of Woodbridge
- Coordinates: 31.891°S 115.992°E
- Country: Australia
- State: Western Australia
- City: Perth
- LGA: City of Swan
- Established: 2001

Government
  - State electorate: Midland
  - Federal division: Hasluck

Population
  - Total: 1,207 (SAL 2021)
- Postcode: 6056
Suburbs around Woodbridge
Caversham	Viveash	Midland
Guildford	Woodbridge	Midland
South Guildford	Hazelmere	Hazelmere

Woodbridge is a suburb of Perth, Western Australia, located within the City of Swan local government area. Formerly part of Midland and previously informally named West Midland, its name, which was officially gazetted on 1 March 2001, is from Governor James Stirling's original 1829 land grant which he named after his wife's family property near Guildford in England.

On 4 October 2004, Transperth renamed the West Midland railway station to Woodbridge station. The station is part of the Midland railway line which serves the eastern suburbs as a rapid transit railway.

Woodbridge House, a National Trust property on the edge of the Swan River, is now a museum that is open to the public. It was previously owned by Charles Harper.

Governor Stirling Senior High School is within the locality.

== Transport ==
=== Bus ===
- 290 Midland Station to Redcliffe Station – serves Great Eastern Highway and Woodbridge Station
- 291 Midland Station to Redcliffe Station – serves Amherst Road
- 301 Midland Station to Midland Station – Circular Route, serves Yelverton Drive

=== Rail ===
- Midland Line
  - Woodbridge Station
