= Guildford railway station, Perth =

Railway station in Perth, Western Australia

Guildford
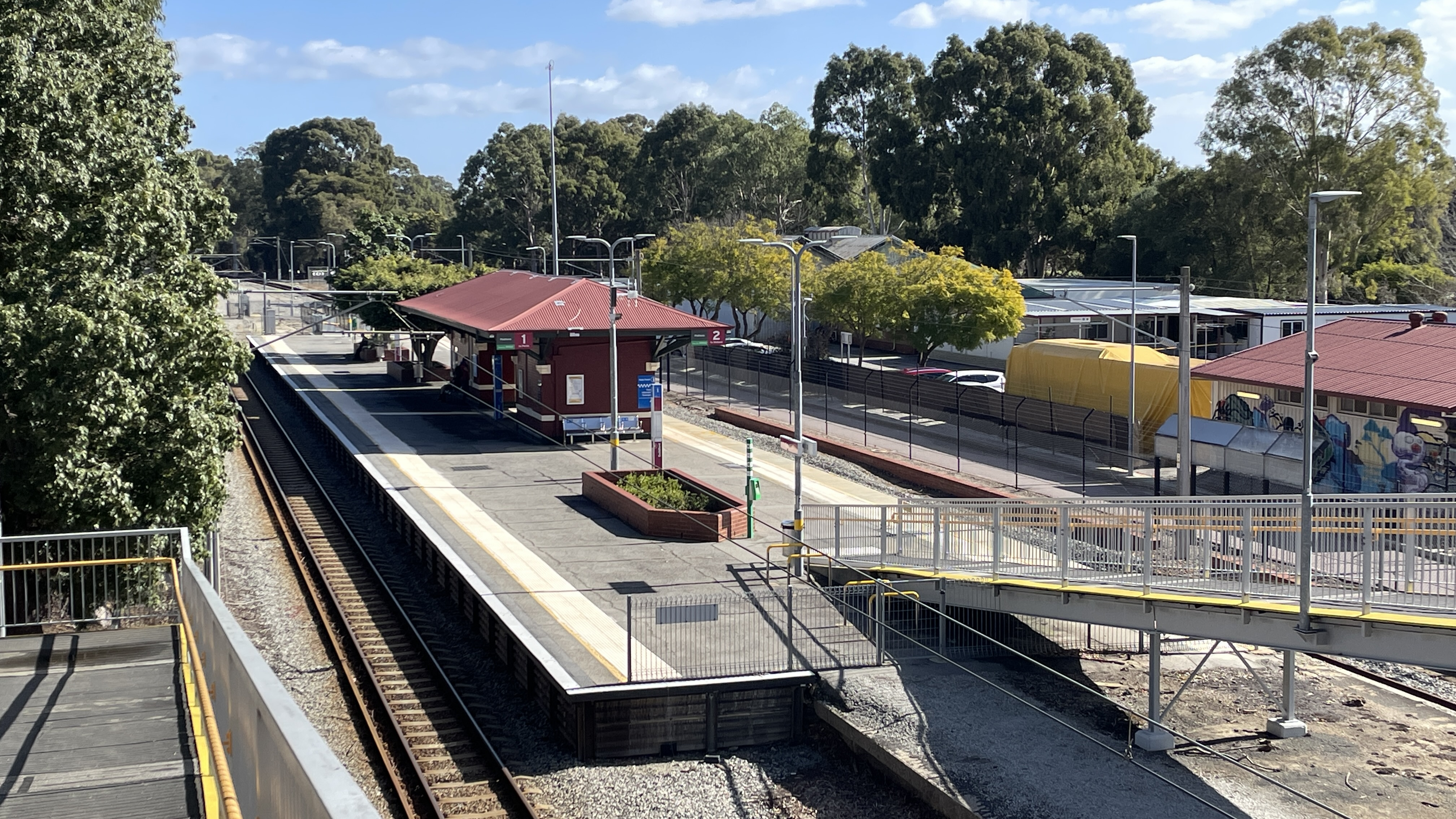
- Looking westbound to the platforms from the footbridge

General information
- Location: James Street, Victoria Street; Guildford
- Coordinates: 31°53′56″S 115°57′57″E
- Owner: Public Transport Authority
- Operator: Transperth Trains
- Line: Midland line
- Distance: 12.5 km (7.8 mi) from Perth
- Platforms: 2 (1 island)

Construction
- Structure type: Open Station
- Accessible: Assisted access

Other information
- Station code: MGD
- Fare zone: 2

History
- Opened: 1881

Passengers
- 2013–14: 173,974

Services
Preceding station	Transperth	Following station
Success Hill towards Perth	Midland line	East Guildford towards Midland

Western Australia Heritage Register
- Type: State Registered Place
- Part of: Guildford Historic Town (2915)
- Reference no.: 17684
Location
- Location of Guildford railway station

Guildford railway station is a Transperth station 12.5 km from Perth railway station, in Guildford, Western Australia, on the Midland Line.

== History ==
The station opened in 1881 as the terminus of the original Eastern Railway from Fremantle. In the mid-1880s a second station was built, and a third in 1898. In 1960 the main station was demolished for a carpark, but the 1898 shelter and platform still remain.

== Rail services ==
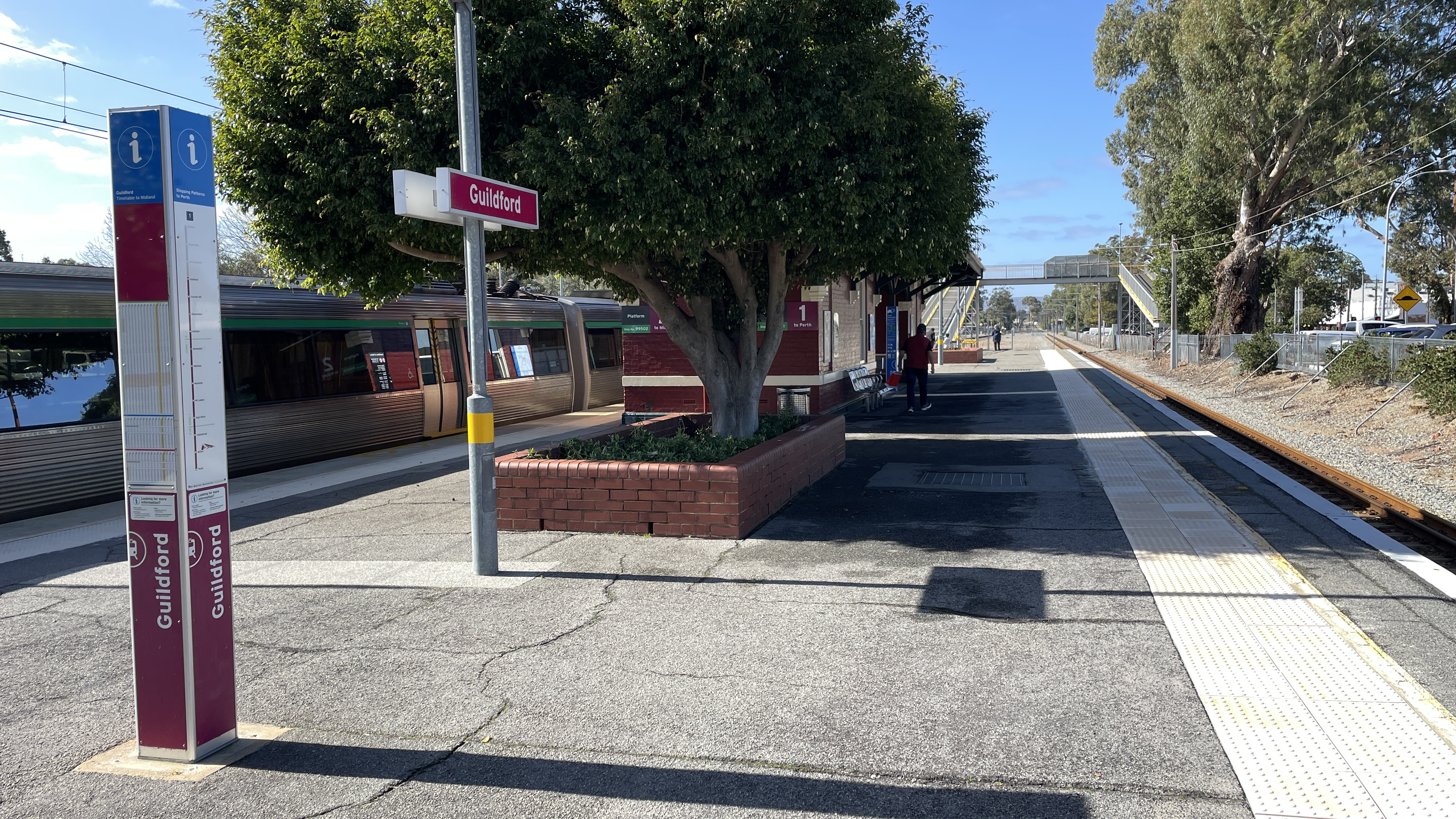
Platform 1

Guildford railway station is served by the Midland railway line on the Transperth network. This line goes between Midland railway station and Perth railway station. Midland line trains stop at the station every 11 minutes during peak on weekdays, and every 15 minutes during the day outside peak every day of the year except Christmas Day. Trains are half-hourly or hourly at night time. The station saw 173,974 passengers in the 2013-14 financial year.

=== Platforms ===
Guildford platform arrangement
Stop ID	Platform	Line	Service Pattern	Destination	Via	Notes
99501	1	Midland line	All stations	Perth		
99502	2	Midland line	All stations	Midland		

== Bus routes ==
Stop	Route	Destination / description	Notes
Victoria Street (east bound)	901	Train replacement service to Perth	
James Street (east bound)	901	Train replacement service to Midland	
