= Midland line, Perth =

Suburban rail service in Perth, Western Australia

Midland line
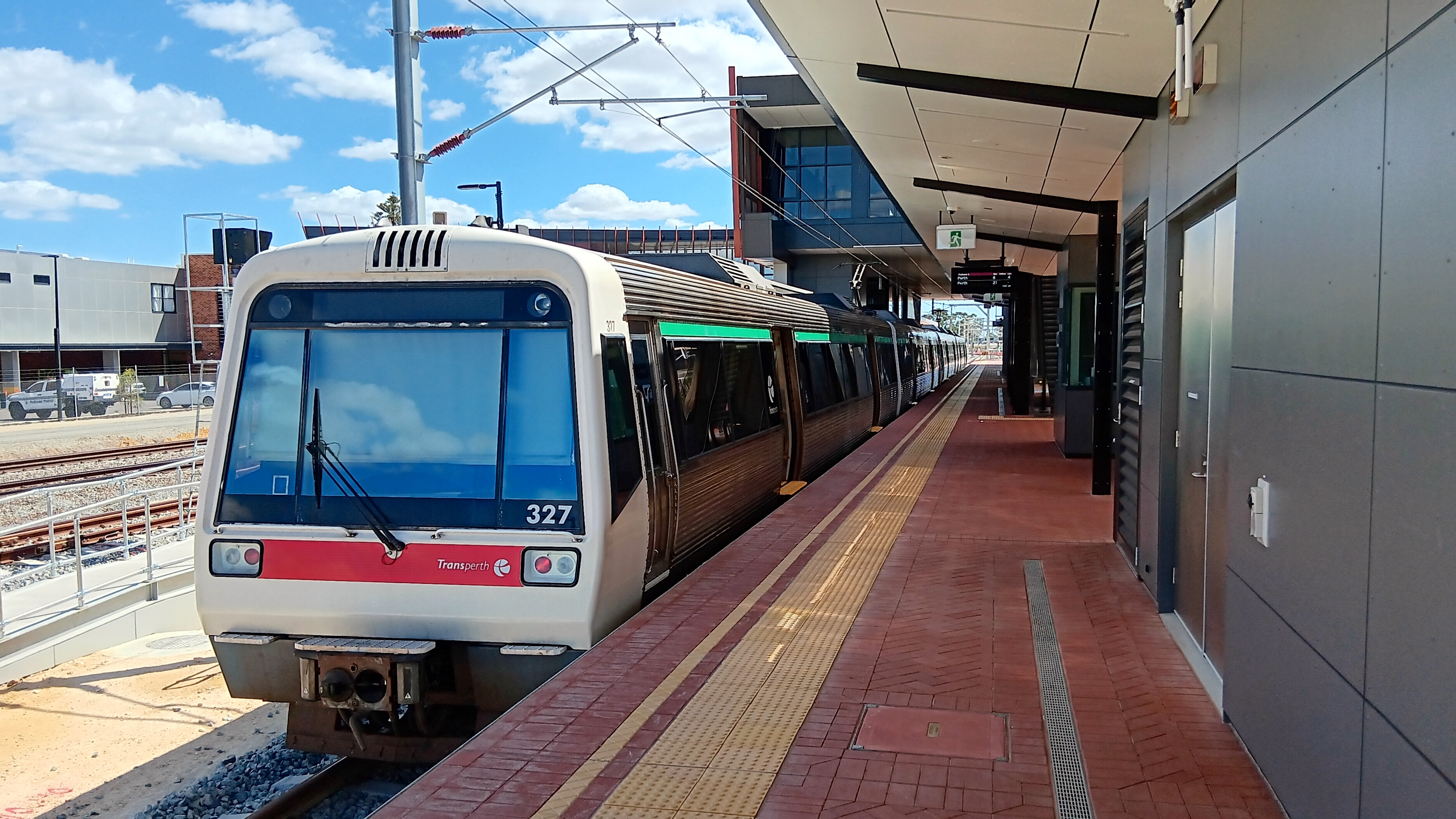
- Midland station, the eastern end of the line

Overview
- Status: Operational
- Owner: Public Transport Authority
- Termini: Perth; Midland
- Stations: 15

Service
- Type: Suburban rail
- System: Transperth
- Operator: Transperth Train Operations
- Depot(s): Claisebrook railway depot, Bellevue railway depot
- Rolling stock: Transperth A-series, Transperth B-series
- Ridership: 4,289,206 (year to June 2024)

History
- Opened: 1881

Technical
- Line length: 16.4 km (10.2 mi)
- Track gauge: 1,067 mm (3 ft 6 in); 1,435 mm (4 ft 8 1/2 in)
- Electrification: 25 kV 50 Hz AC from overhead catenary

The Midland line is a suburban rail service on the Transperth network in Perth, Western Australia. It runs on the Eastern Railway through Perth's eastern suburbs and connects Midland with Perth.

== History ==
=== Early history ===
The section of the Eastern Railway between Fremantle, Perth and Guildford was the first suburban railway line in Perth, opening on 1 March 1881.

The line was extended from Guildford to Chidlow's Well, opening in March 1884. Throughout the 1880s, the Eastern Railway line was extended beyond Guildford and Midland Junction along its first route to Chidlow and Northam. The second route varied after Bellevue proceeding to Chidlow via the Swan View Tunnel, Parkerville and Stoneville.

The third route saw the removal of the Bellevue Railway station in its construction, with the new Midland railway terminus replacing the older Midland Junction railway station. An anomaly of the Midland line timetables in the 1950s and 1960s was that Bellevue was nominally the terminus of the line until 1962. Koongamia, which was a new station prior to Greenmount on the original first route, was the terminus from 1962 to 1966.

In 1966, the stations on the first two Eastern Railway routes as well as the old Midland Junction railway station were closed and a new Midland railway station was constructed 200 metres (660 ft) to the west and became the new terminus.

Generally, changes from the 1970s saw a significant number of stations on the line moved or turned into island platform stations (to be compatible with the double track, dual-gauge track configuration between East Perth and Midland).

In the early decades of the twentieth century, a significant number of rail-crossing accidents between motor vehicles and trains occurred. Unattended crossings were provided with boom gates, flashing lights and bells to counter inattention or risk taking from drivers. Also, crossings were reduced, and in a number of locations, bridges were constructed.

=== Building better stations ===
On 24 July 2004, Bassendean became the first station to be upgraded under the "Building Better Stations" project.

=== Metronet ===
==== Airport railway connection ====
In December 2013, the Government of Western Australia announced its intention to construct a railway line branching off the Midland line east of Bayswater station to Forrestfield via Perth Airport. Construction of the Forrestfield–Airport Link commenced in November 2016 and was scheduled to open in 2021. After construction delays it opened on 9 October 2022.

==== Ellenbrook line ====
The Ellenbrook line, which functions as a branch northward from the Midland line east of Bayswater station, was opened on 8 December 2024.

==== New Midland station ====
As part of Metronet, Midland Station was demolished and replaced with a new station located approcimately 300 metres (980 ft) to the east between Helena and Cale streets. This also included the construction of a new railcar assembly facility and depot in Bellevue located approximately 1 kilometre (0.62 mi) east of the new station.

== Description ==
During hot weather, the tracks can distort. As a result, train speeds are reduced by approximately 20 kilometres per hour (12 mph) when the air temperature is above 37 °C (99 °F), and by an additional 10 kilometres per hour (6.2 mph) when the air temperature is above 41 °C (106 °F).

The Transperth network currently uses fixed block signalling and automatic train protection, which stops trains that pass a red signal and slows trains that drive too fast. These systems will be replaced by an automatic train control system, likely a communications-based train control system. The new systems are planned to be in place on the Midland line by June 2027.

=== Route ===
Transperth system map, with the Midland line in maroon. The Ellenbrook line (red) and the Airport line (turquoise) branch from the Midland line at Bayswater.

=== Stations ===
Since 21 July 2019, all regular services stop at all stations on this line.

Station	Distance from Perth		Fare zone	Location	Opened	Connections
Station	km	mi	Fare zone	Location	Opened	Connections
Perth	0.0	0.0	1/FTZ	Perth	1881	Bus at Perth Busport, Airport, Armadale, Australind, Ellenbrook, Fremantle, Mandurah, Midland, Thornlie–Cockburn and Yanchep Lines
McIver	0.7	0.4	1/FTZ	Perth	1989	Airport line, Armadale line, Ellenbrook line, Midland line, and Thornlie–Cockburn line
Claisebrook	1.3	0.8	1/FTZ	East Perth, Perth	1883	Airport line, Armadale line, Ellenbrook line, Midland line, and Thornlie–Cockburn line
East Perth	2.1	1.3	1	East Perth, Perth	1969	Airport Line, Ellenbrook Line, Midland Line, Transwa coaches, MerredinLink, Prospector, and Indian Pacific
Mount Lawley	3.2	2.0	1	Mount Lawley	1907	Airport Line, Ellenbrook Line and Midland Line
Maylands	4.5	2.8	1	Maylands	1896	Airport Line, Ellenbrook Line and Midland Line
Meltham	5.5	3.4	1	Bayswater	1948	Airport Line, Ellenbrook Line and Midland Line
Bayswater	6.8	4.2	1	Bayswater	1896	Bus, Airport Line, Ellenbrook Line and Midland Line
Ashfield	9.3	5.8	2	Ashfield, Bassendean	1954	
Bassendean	10.8	6.7	2	Bassendean	1910	Bus
Success Hill	11.7	7.3	2	Bassendean	1960	
Guildford	12.6	7.8	2	Guildford	1881	
East Guildford	14.1	8.8	2	Guildford	1896	
Woodbridge	15.4	9.6	2	Woodbridge	1903	
Midland	16.4	10.2	2	Midland	1968	Bus, AvonLink, MerredinLink, Prospector

== Service ==
=== Stopping patterns ===
Legend — Stopping Patterns

- ● – All trains stop
- ◐ – Some services do not stop
- | – Trains pass and do not stop

Midland Services
Station	Zone	All	AE	W
Perth	1	●	●	●
McIver	1	●		●
Claisebrook	1	●		●
East Perth	1	●	●	●
Mount Lawley	1	●	●	●
Maylands	1	●	●	●
Meltham	1	●	●	●
Bayswater	1	●	●	●
Ashfield	2	●	●	
Bassendean	2	●	●	
Success Hill	2	●	●	
East Guildford	2	●	●	
Guildford	2	●	●	
Woodbridge	2	●	●	
Midland	2	●	●	

=== Patronage ===
Below is the annual patronage of Midland line from 2010 to 2024 financial year. Figures are provided as total boardings, which includes all fare-paying boardings and free travel on stations within the free transit zones as well as transfers between stations. The figures for rail replacement and special events services are not included in the total.

Midland line annual patronage
Year	Patronage	±%
2010–11	6,319,788	—
2011–12	6,626,464	+4.85%
2012–13	6,688,843	+0.94%
2013–14	6,646,213	−0.64%
2014–15	6,661,434	+0.23%
2015–16	6,437,107	−3.37%
2016–17	6,143,986	−4.55%
2017–18	5,784,146	−5.86%
2018–19	5,994,370	+3.63%
2019–20	5,025,933	−16.16%
2020–21	4,407,653	−12.30%
2021–22	4,243,760	−3.72%
2022–23	3,889,196	−8.35%
2023–24	4,289,206	+10.29%

View source data.

== See also ==
=== Current information ===
- Transperth
- Transperth Train Operations
- List of Transperth railway stations
- Bayswater Subway

=== Historical information ===
- Midland Railway of Western Australia
