= Town of Bassendean =

Coordinates: 31°54′18″S 115°56′56″E

- Local government area
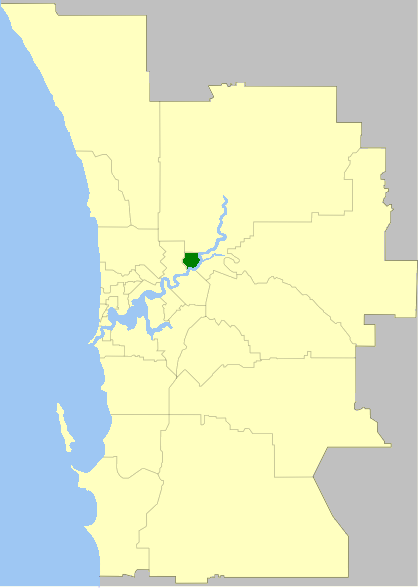
- Location of Town of Bassendean within inner Perth metropolitan area

- Interactive map of Town of Bassendean
- Country: Australia
- State: Western Australia
- Region: Eastern Metropolitan Perth
- Established: 1901
- Council seat: Bassendean

Government
  - Mayor: Kath Hamilton
  - State electorate: Bassendean
  - Federal division: Perth

Area
  - Total: 10.4 km^{2} (4.0 sq mi)

Population
  - Total: 15,932 (LGA 2021)
- Website: Town of Bassendean
LGAs around Town of Bassendean
Bayswater	Swan	Swan
Bayswater	Town of Bassendean	Swan
Bayswater	Belmont	Belmont

The Town of Bassendean is a local government area in the northeastern suburbs of the Western Australian capital city of Perth, 6 kilometres (4 mi) west of the industrial centre of Midland and about 12 kilometres (7 mi) northeast of Perth's central business district. The Town covers an area of 10.4 square kilometres (4.0 sq mi), maintains 97 km of roads and had a population of approximately 15,000 as at the 2016 Census. The Town of Bassendean is a member of the Eastern Metropolitan Regional Council.

== History ==
The West Guildford Road District was created on 10 May 1901. It was renamed the Bassendean Road District on 7 July 1922, and on 1 July 1961, became the Shire of Bassendean following the enactment of the Local Government Act 1960, which reformed all remaining road districts into shires. It assumed its current name when it gained town status on 1 July 1975.

== Wards ==
The Town does not have any wards however in the past it was divided into three wards.

=== 2023 election results ===
2023 Western Australian local elections: Bassendean
Party	Candidate	Votes	%	±%
Independent	Tallan Ames (elected)	813	23.40	
Independent	Jamayne Burke (elected)	624	17.96	
Independent Labor	Ken John (elected)	600	17.27	
Independent	Hilary MacWilliam	530	15.26	
Independent	Bill Busby	515	14.82	
Independent	Jess McCarthy	202	5.81	
Independent	Patrick Eijkenboom	190	5.47	
Total formal votes		3,474	99.03	
Informal votes		34	0.97	
Turnout		3,508	29.88	

== Suburbs ==
The suburbs of the Town of Bassendean with population and size figures based on the most recent Australian census:

Suburb	Population	Area	Map
Ashfield	1,395 (SAL 2021)	0.78 km^{2} (0.30 sq mi)	
Bassendean	10,837 (SAL 2021)	7.39 km^{2} (2.85 sq mi)	
Eden Hill	3,703 (SAL 2021)	2.17 km^{2} (0.84 sq mi)	

== Mayors ==
The current mayor is Kath Hamilton, who was elected in October 2021. Previous Mayor Renee McLennan is Deputy Mayor.

== Population ==
Historical population

Year	Pop.	±% p.a.
1911	987	—
1921	2,736	+10.73%
1933	3,803	+2.78%
1947	5,243	+2.32%
1954	7,152	+4.54%
1961	8,310	+2.17%
1966	9,747	+3.24%
1971	11,360	+3.11%
1976	11,382	+0.04%

Year	Pop.	±% p.a.
1981	11,807	+0.74%
1986	12,836	+1.69%
1991	13,109	+0.42%
1996	13,230	+0.18%
2001	13,362	+0.20%
2006	13,462	+0.15%
2011	14,404	+1.36%
2016	15,092	+0.94%
2021	15,932	+1.09%

== Heritage listed places ==
As of 2024, 335 places are heritage-listed in the Town of Bassendean, of which 13 are on the State Register of Heritage Places, among them the former Bassendean Fire Station and the Bassendean Oval.
