= Success Hill railway station =

Railway station in Perth, Western Australia

Success Hill
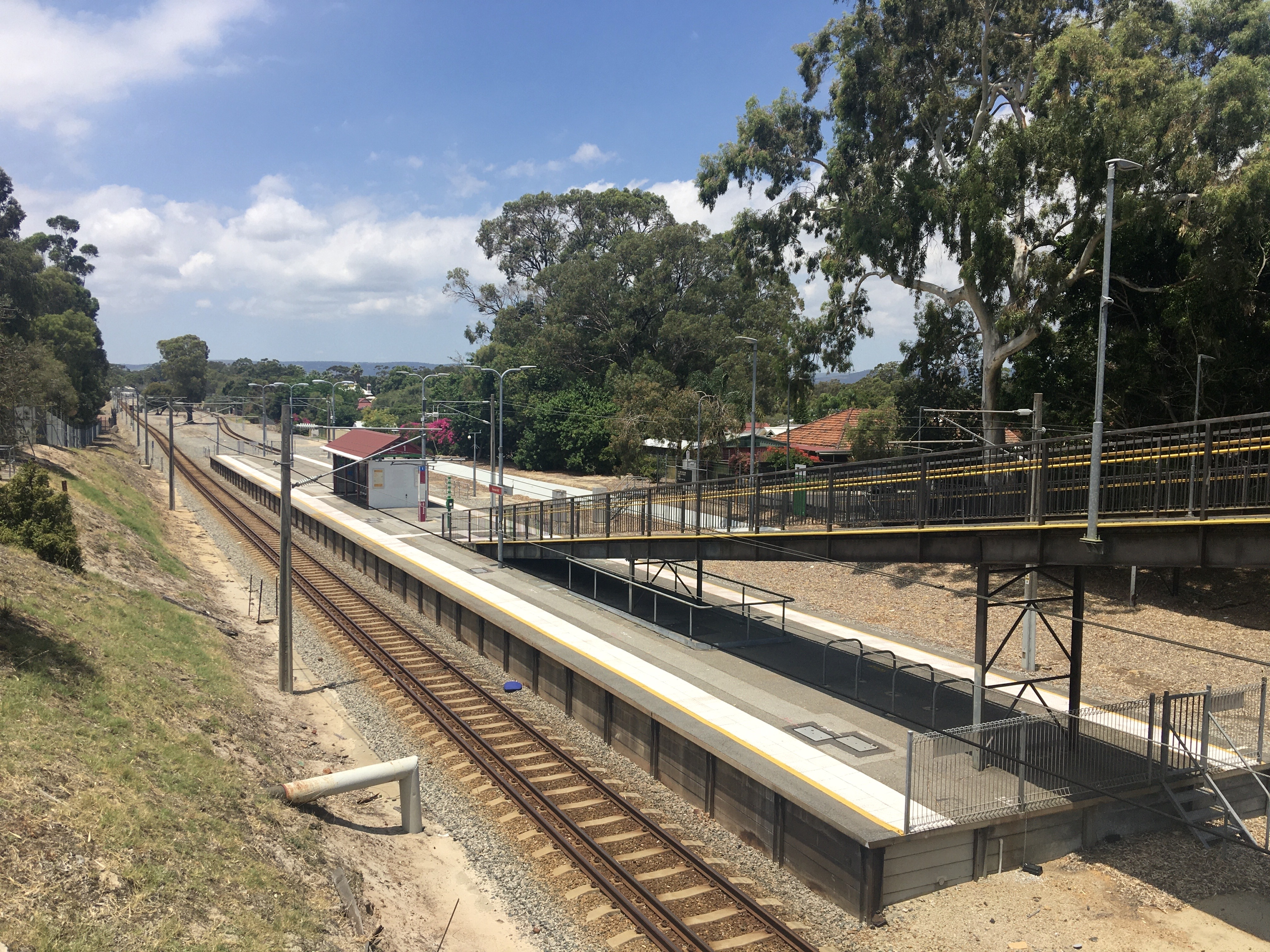
- Eastbound view of Platform 2, viewed from the pedestrian footbridge, prior to platform resurfacing in December 2022

General information
- Location: Railway Parade, Thompson Road; Bassendean
- Coordinates: 31°54′00″S 115°57′18″E
- Owner: Public Transport Authority
- Operator: Transperth Trains
- Line: Midland line
- Distance: 11.6 km (7.2 mi) from Perth
- Platforms: 2 (1 island)

Construction
- Structure type: Open Station

Other information
- Station code: MSH
- Fare zone: 2

History
- Opened: 1960

Passengers
- 2013–14: 47,028

Services
Preceding station	Transperth	Following station
Bassendean towards Perth	Midland line	Guildford towards Midland
Location
- Location of Success Hill railway station

Success Hill railway station is a Transperth railway station 11.6 km from Perth railway station, in Western Australia, on the Midland Line.

== History ==
The station was opened in 1960 to serve football fans. In mid-2023, the station underwent platform resurfacing works.

== Rail services ==
Success Hill railway station is served by the Midland railway line on the Transperth network. This line goes between Midland railway station and Perth railway station. Midland line trains stop at the station every 12 minutes during peak on weekdays, and every 15 minutes during the day outside peak every day of the year except Christmas Day. Trains are half-hourly or hourly at night time. The station saw 47,028 passengers in the 2013-14 financial year.

The station is the recommended stop for those attending WAFL games at Steel Blue Oval, the home stadium of the Swan Districts Football Club.

=== Platforms ===
Success Hill platform arrangement
Stop ID	Platform	Line	Service Pattern	Destination	Via	Notes
99491	1	Midland line	All stations	Perth		
99492	2	Midland line	All stations	Midland		

== Bus routes ==
Stop	Route	Destination / description	Notes
Guildford Road (west bound) Access from Thompson Road	901	Train replacement service to Perth	
Guildford Road (east bound)	901	Train replacement service to Midland	
