= Ashfield railway station, Perth =

Railway station in Perth, Western Australia

Ashfield
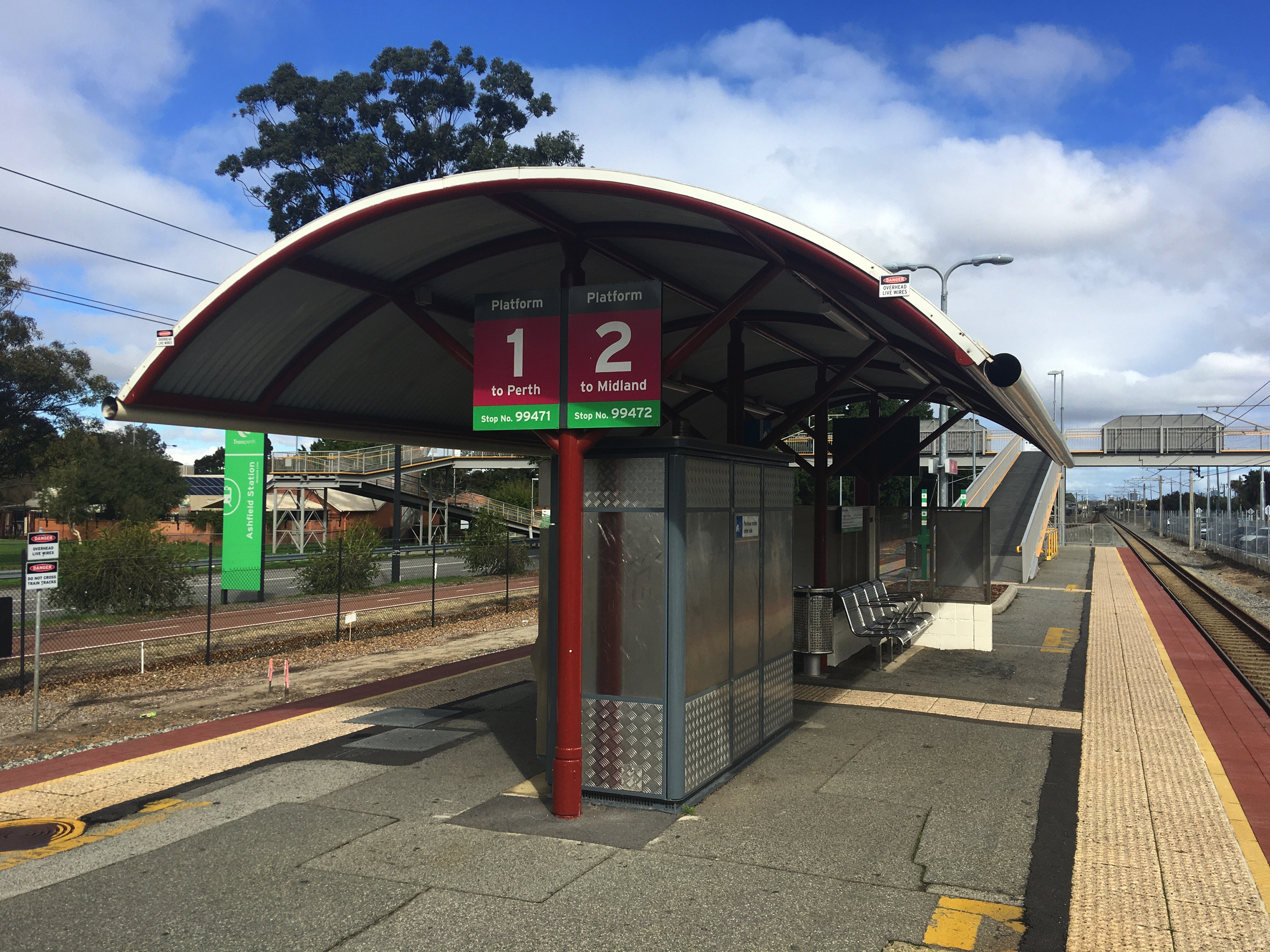
- South-west bound view from Platform 2, July 2021

General information
- Location: Guildford Road, Railway Parade; Ashfield, Bassendean; Western Australia; Australia
- Coordinates: 31°54′47″S 115°56′10″E
- Owner: Public Transport Authority
- Operator: Transperth Trains
- Line: Midland line
- Distance: 9.2 km (5.7 mi) from Perth
- Platforms: 2 (1 island)

Construction
- Structure type: Open station

Other information
- Station code: MAD
- Fare zone: 2

History
- Opened: 1954

Passengers
- 2013–2014: 143,391

Services
Preceding station	Transperth	Following station
Bayswater towards Perth	Midland line	Bassendean towards Midland
Location
- Location of Ashfield railway station

Ashfield railway station is a railway station on the Transperth network. It is located on the Midland line, 9.2 kilometres (5.7 mi) from Perth station serving the suburb of Ashfield.

== History ==
The station opened as a signal box named Cresco in 1930, with passenger facilities provided in 1954. The signal box remained until 1964.

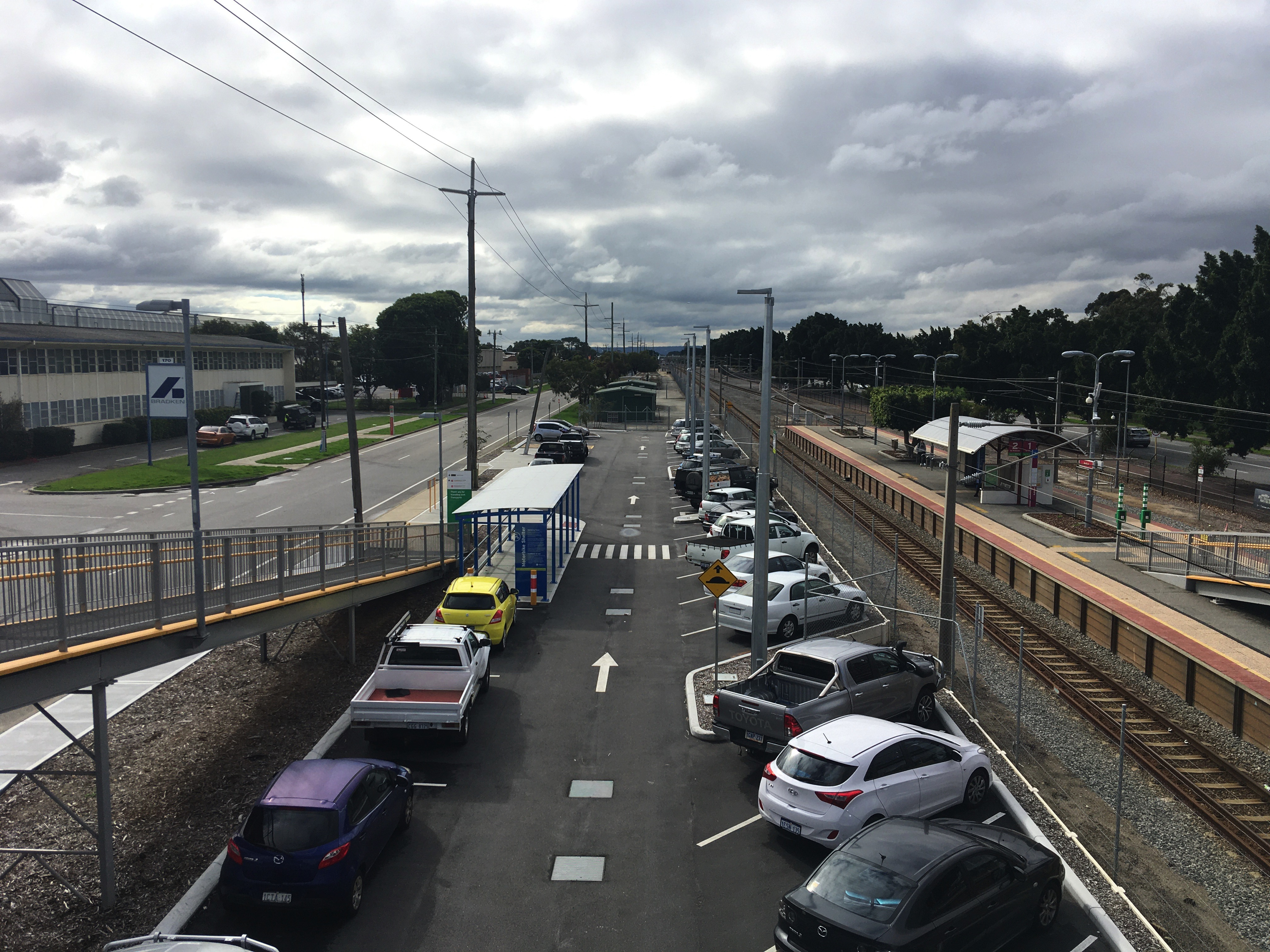
Ashfield railway station carpark viewed from footbridge, built in 2020

Construction on a new 83-bay car park started in February 2020. The new car park was needed because 180 bays were permanently removed from Bayswater station in late-2020 due to the construction of the new Bayswater station. Since Ashfield station is in fare zone two, and Bayswater station is in fare zone one, catching the train into the city is more expensive from Ashfield. In order to offset the additional cost for passengers going to Ashfield station instead of Bayswater, the parking at Ashfield station was free during the construction of the new Bayswater station. All other stations on the Transperth network have a $2 per day parking fee. The new carpark opened in October 2020.

== Rail services ==
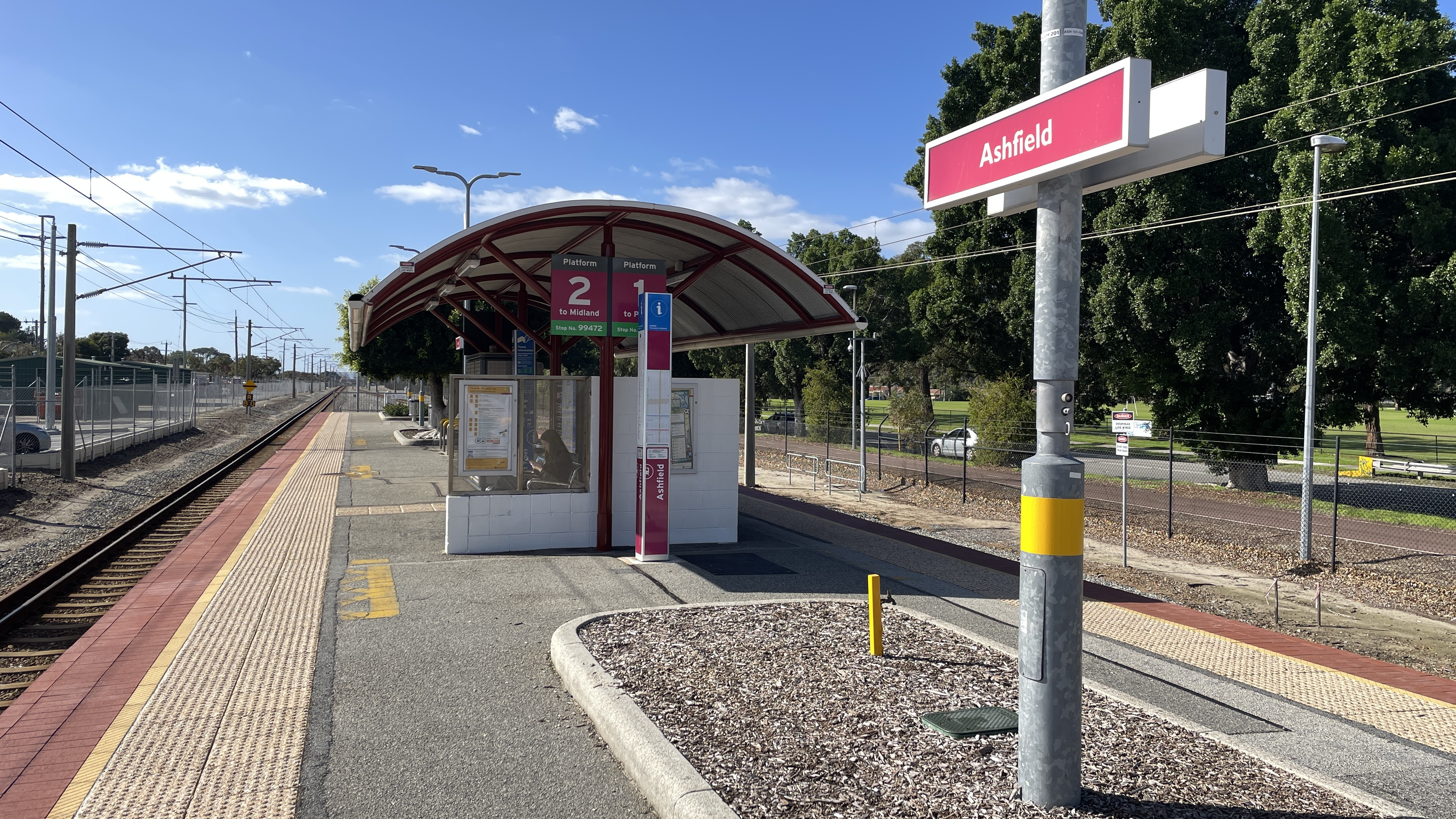
Platforms

Ashfield station is served by the Midland line on the Transperth network. This line goes between Midland station and Perth station. Midland line trains stop at the station every 12 minutes during peak on weekdays, and every 15 minutes during the day outside peak every day of the year except Christmas Day. Trains are half-hourly or hourly at night time. The station saw 143,391 passengers in the 2013–2014 financial year.

=== Platforms ===
Ashfield platform arrangement
Stop ID	Platform	Line	Service Pattern	Destination	Via	Notes
99471	1	Midland line	All stations	Perth		
99472	2	Midland line	All stations	Midland		

== Bus routes ==
Stop	Route	Destination / description	Notes
Railway Parade (south-west bound)	901	Train replacement service to Perth	
Railway Parade (north-east bound)	901	Train replacement service to Midland	
