= Bayswater railway station, Perth =

Railway station in Perth, Western Australia

Bayswater
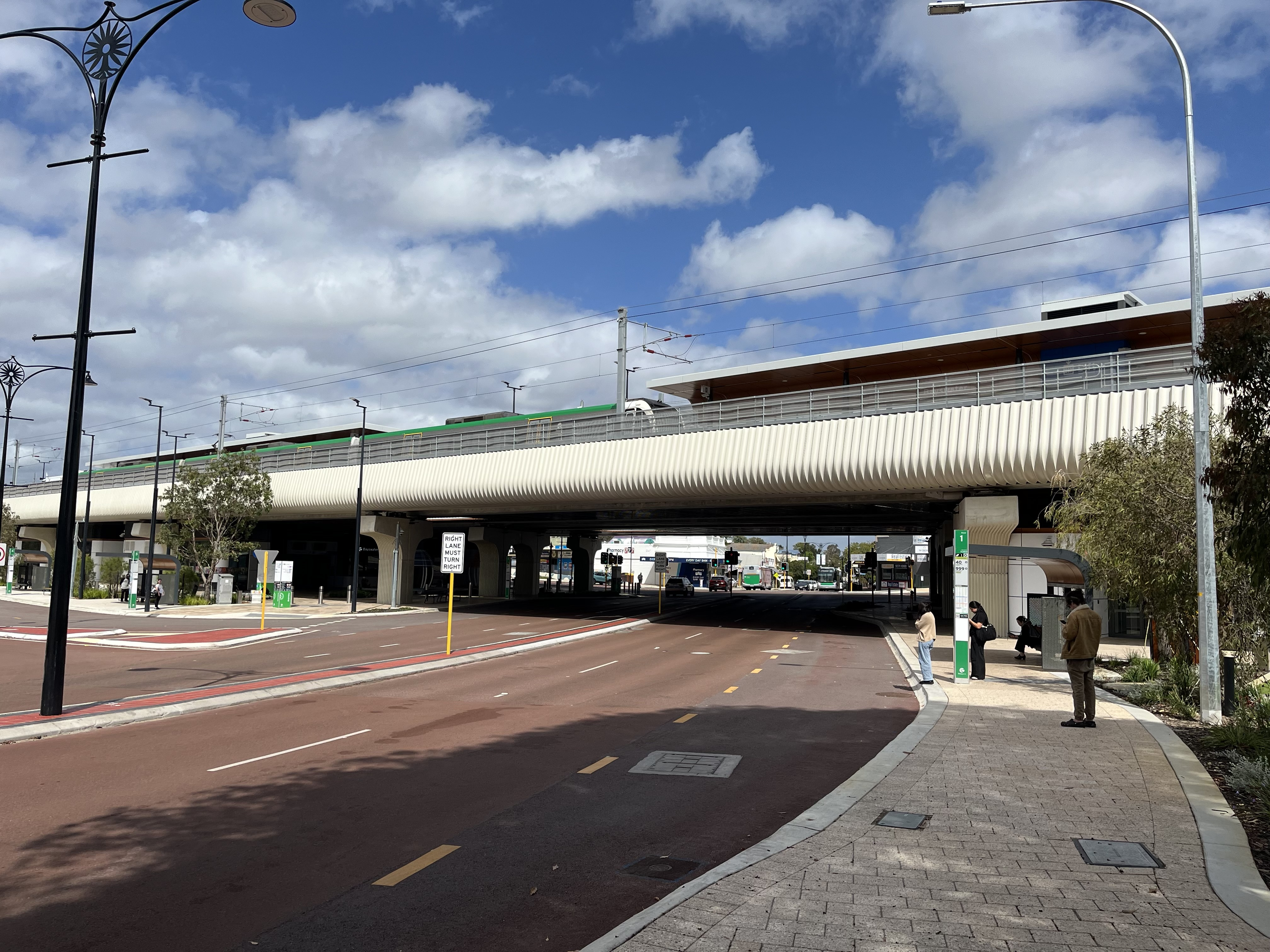
- View of Bayswater station from the north, November 2024

General information
- Location: King William Street, Coode Street, Railway Parade, Whatley Crescent; Bayswater, Western Australia; Australia
- Coordinates: 31°55′06″S 115°54′45″E
- Owner: Public Transport Authority
- Operator: Public Transport Authority
- Lines: Airport line Ellenbrook line Midland line
- Distance: 6.7 km (4.2 mi) from Perth
- Platforms: 2 island platforms with 4 platform edges
- Tracks: 4
- Bus routes: 6
- Bus stands: 5

Construction
- Structure type: Elevated
- Accessible: Yes

Other information
- Fare zone: 1

History
- Opened: 1896
- Rebuilt: Late 1960s, 2021–2024

Passengers
- 2013–14: 527,269

Services
Preceding station	Transperth	Following station
Meltham towards Perth	Midland line	Ashfield towards Midland
Meltham towards Perth or Claremont	Airport line	Redcliffe towards High Wycombe
Meltham towards Perth	Ellenbrook line	Morley towards Ellenbrook
Location
- Location of Bayswater station

Bayswater railway station is a suburban rail station in Bayswater, a suburb of Perth, Western Australia. It is the junction station for Transperth's Airport, Ellenbrook and Midland lines.

The station first opened in 1896 on the Perth to Midland railway with two side platforms and an adjacent goods yard. It served as the junction station for the Belmont spur line between 1896 and 1956. Bayswater station was rebuilt as an island platform just to the north in the late 1960s when the Midland line was converted from narrow gauge to dual gauge; the standard gauge trains were unable to fit between the side platforms. Around that time, the goods yard closed.

A second rebuild of Bayswater station began in January 2021 in order to increase the number of platforms to four to accommodate the under-construction Airport and Ellenbrook lines, and raise the height of the nearby 3.8-metre-high (12 ft) low-clearance Bayswater Subway to 4.8 metres (16 ft). The Airport line opened on 9 October 2022. The old station closed on 31 March 2023 and was demolished soon after that. The first half of the new station opened on 8 October 2023, the second half of the new station opened on 8 April 2024, and the bus station opened two weeks later. On 8 December 2024, the Ellenbrook line opened.

Services on each line run every twelve minutes during peak and every fifteen minutes between peak, for a combined frequency of a train every four minutes during peak and 5 minutes between peak. The journey to Perth station is 6.7 kilometres (4.2 mi), and takes twelve minutes. Feeder buses run to Elizabeth Quay bus station, Galleria bus station, Bassendean, and other places.

== Description ==
]

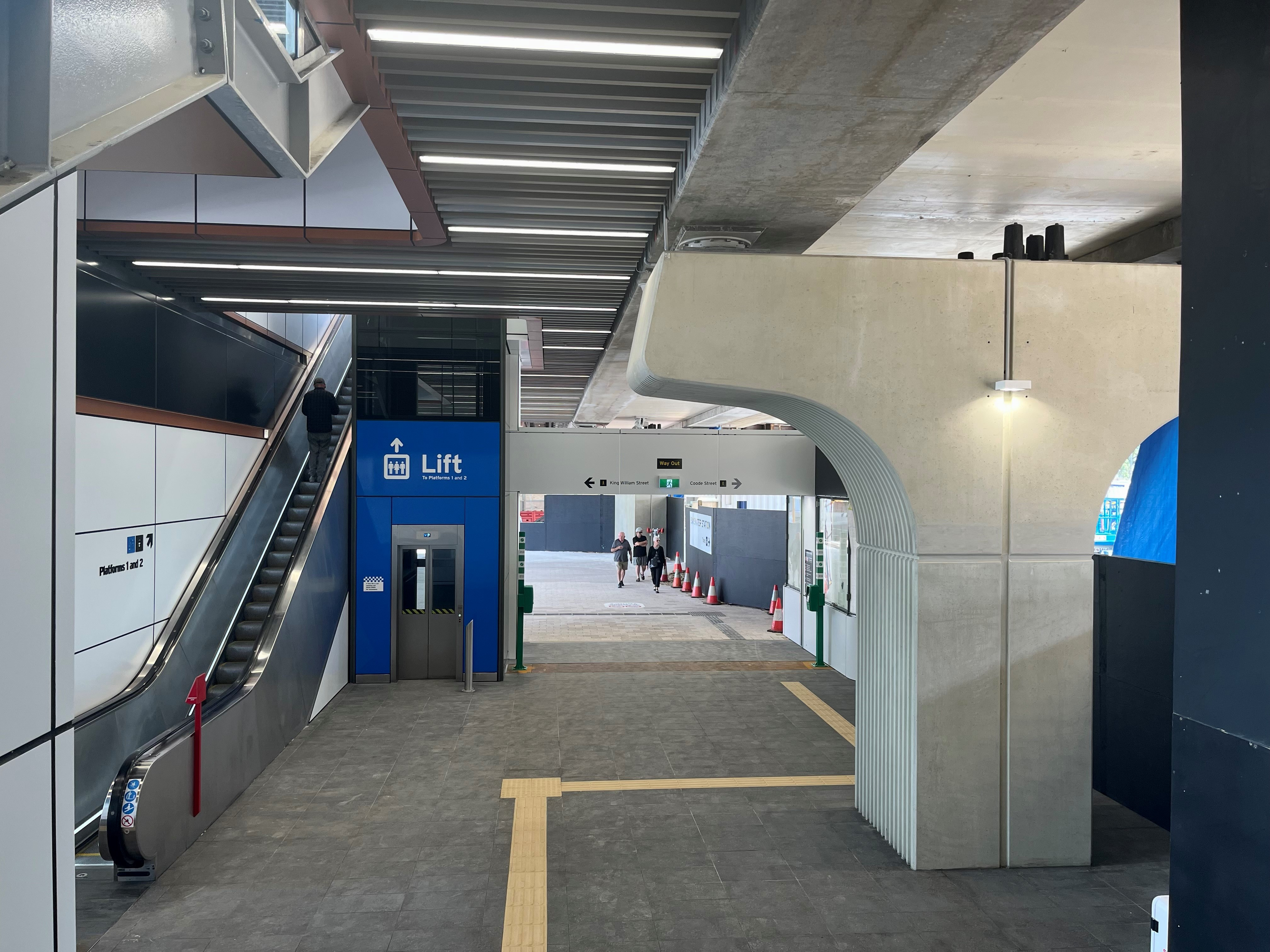
Eastern entrance in October 2023

Bayswater station is in Bayswater, a suburb of Perth, Western Australia. It is on a viaduct crossing Coode Street within the heart of the Bayswater town centre. To the south is Whatley Crescent and to the north is Railway Parade. It is 6.7 kilometres (4.2 mi), or a 12-minute train journey, from Perth station, and is within fare zone one. The adjacent stations are Meltham station towards Perth, Ashfield station towards Midland, Morley station towards Ellenbrook and Redcliffe station towards High Wycombe.

Bayswater station has two island platforms making up four numbered platforms in total which straddle Coode Street on the railway viaduct. The platform is in excess of 150 metres (490 ft) long, making it long enough for a six-car train, the longest Transperth trains. There are two entry buildings below the platforms, which are on either side of Coode Street. Each entry building has stairs and lifts, with the eastern one also having escalators. The tracks through platforms 1 and 4 are dual gauge. Transperth services operate on narrow gauge; standard gauge trains such as the Indian Pacific and Transwa regional train services do not stop at the station. On Coode Street under the station platforms are two bus stops. There are another three bus stops on Railway Parade, making for a total of five bus stops.

=== Public art ===
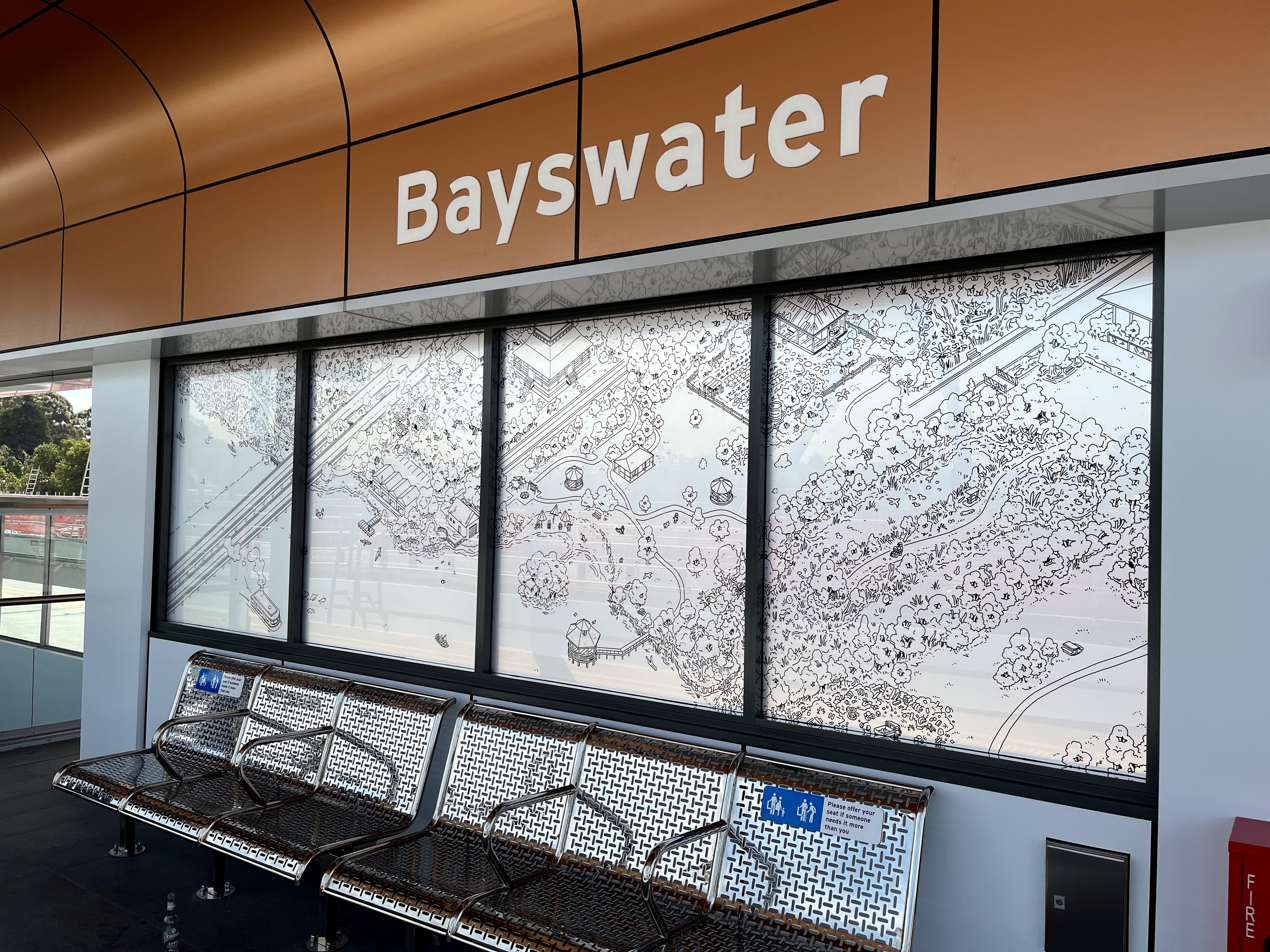
Artwork on the station platform by Nathanael Whale depicting the Swan River at Bayswater

There are eight pieces of public art on and around Bayswater station. Outside the station's main entrance will be two seating sculptures by Miranda Farmer and Jason Hirst, named Kaarl and Kiep, the Noongar language words for fire and water. In the Leake Street underpass will be a mural of local flora and fauna by Emily Jackson. In several locations around the station will be murals by Andrew Frazer and Jade Dolman featuring the Noongar place name for Bayswater, Biraliny. On the platform is a graphic depicting the river and town centre of Bayswater in an isometric view. On the noise walls along the railway line are paintings of local flora and fauna by Joanna Brown.

== History ==
On 1 March 1881, the Fremantle–Guildford railway line was opened. This railway was soon extended to Midland Junction, and the part between Perth and Midland is now the Midland line. It passed through what is now Bayswater, although at the time, there was no development in the area. The railway line reduced what was previously a several-hour long trip from Bayswater to Perth or Guildford to twenty minutes, which provided an opportunity for development in the area. Development first occurred in Bayswater in July 1885, when the Bayswater Estate was placed onto the property market. The estate centred on Coode Street and King William Street, the first roads in Bayswater. An advertisement for the estate used the railway as one of its selling points. This advertisement was also the first mention of the need for a railway station in Bayswater.

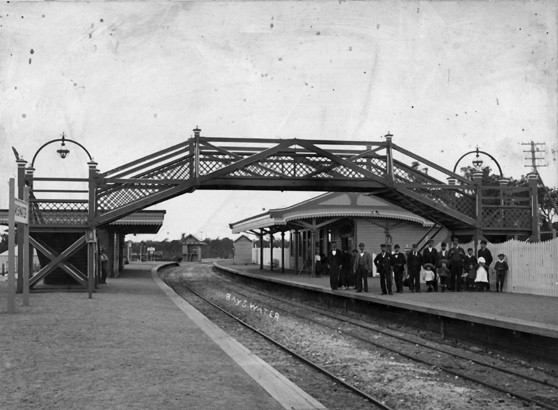
Bayswater station, c. 1900

By 1888, there was a railway siding in Bayswater, but no proper railway station. In 1896, the railway line was duplicated. With this came the construction of Bayswater station, at the centre of the Bayswater Estate. The station consisted of two side platforms connected by a footbridge. The station also had sidings for goods. It was located on the slope of a hill, allowing the nearby construction of the Bayswater Subway bridge later. From 28 September 1896, the station was staffed by a station master. The station became the first major employer in Bayswater, needing staff to operate the station, goods yard, and to direct traffic. In 1897, the station served a population of approximately 400. From the opening of Bayswater station, it was the junction station for the Belmont spur line to the nearby Ascot Racecourse.

Access to the station was an issue over the decades since it was constructed. At first, the only way into the station was from the south near Slade Street, and the station yard did not have good access. In 1898, the Bayswater Road Board asked the Commissioner of Railways, Frederick Henry Piesse, if a pathway into the station could be made from King William Street, and if a pathway could be made from the goods yard to Coode Street. The commissioner agreed to construct roads from Drake Street to Coode Street, from Slade Street to King William Street, and from Drake Street through the goods yard. He also agreed to have a footbridge be constructed over the goods yard to Rose Avenue to the north. Access issues continued though, with the footbridge not actually constructed, and the access pathways being sub-optimal. In 1932, the station was described as the "worst equipped from Midland Junction to Fremantle". In 1935, road board members described the approach to the station as in a "rough and disgraceful condition, and that part of it was sometimes underwater". The Belmont spur line was closed in 1956.

=== First rebuild ===
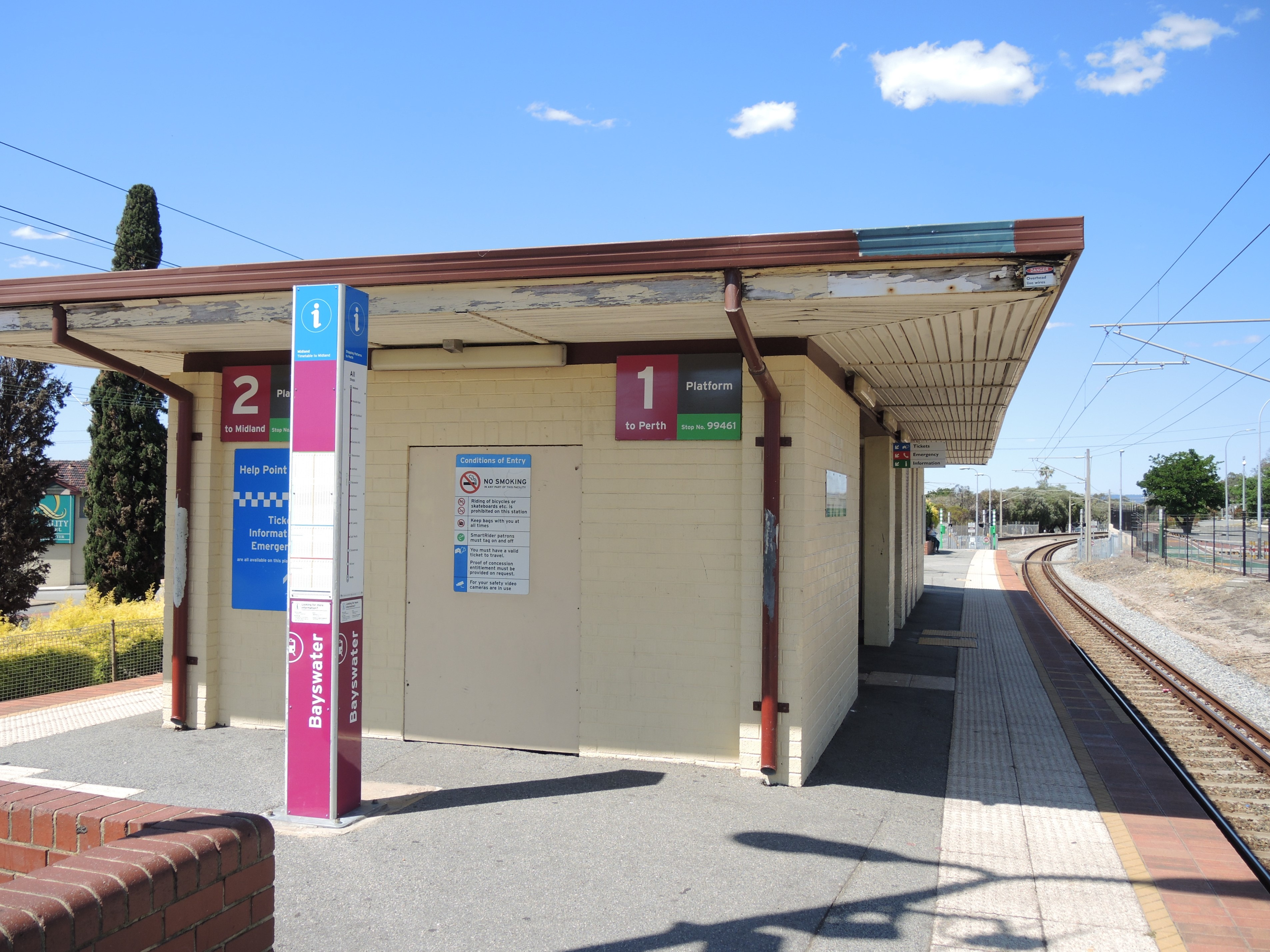
Bayswater station platform shelter in October 2020

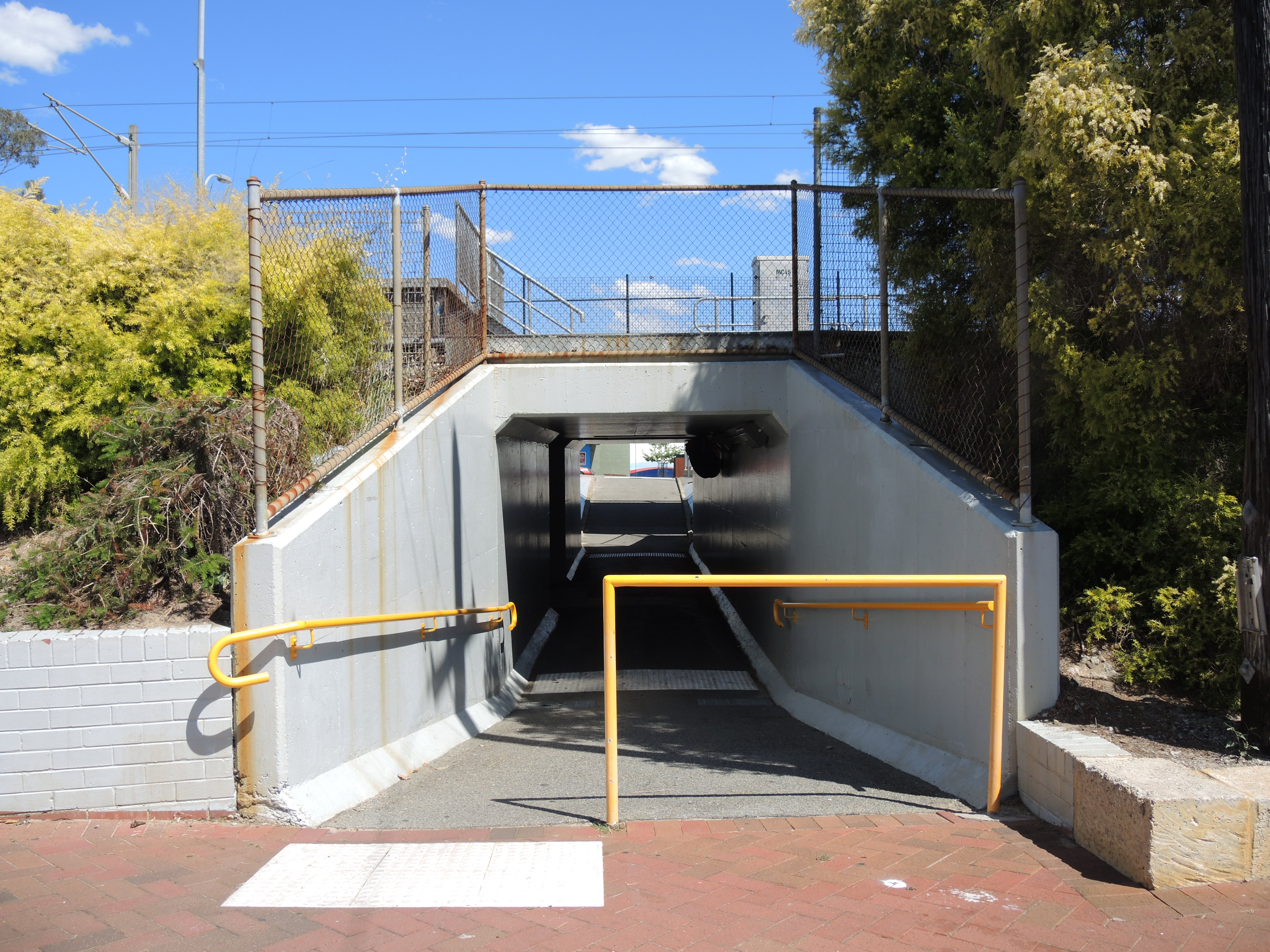
The pedestrian underpass entrance from Railway Parade

During the late 1960s, Bayswater station was rebuilt just north of the previous station, as an island platform. This was because the Midland line was being converted from narrow gauge to dual gauge, and side platforms were not compatible with the standard gauge trains. The Bayswater Subway was rebuilt as well with a greater length and clearance. The goods yard was shut down, making the end of goods trains serving Bayswater station. From 28 February 1976, the station was no longer staffed by a station master.

The new station consisted of a single island platform with two platform faces. The platform was approximately 95 metres (312 ft) long, or long enough for a four-car train but not for a six-car train. At the west end of the platform was a pedestrian subway, accessible from the platform by a ramp. There was also a pedestrian level crossing to the east of the station, which provided access north and south. The station had a small shelter, a transit officer booth, and a bike shelter. The station was not fully accessible; the ramps for access to the station were steep, the pedestrian level crossing had gaps of up to 75 millimetres (3.0 in), and there were large gaps between the platforms and trains as the station was located on a curve. The southern platform face had a gap of 65 millimetres (2.6 in) and the northern platform face had a gap of 80 millimetres (3.1 in).

=== Second rebuild ===
==== Proposals ====
Following the 2014 Forrestfield–Airport Link announcement, which revealed the Airport line would branch off from the Midland line east of Bayswater, residents began lobbying the Government of Western Australia to upgrade Bayswater station. The only works planned at Bayswater station as part of the Forrestfield–Airport Link were minor works to bring the station into compliance with the Disability Discrimination Act 1992. Local residents said it was a missed opportunity to not upgrade the station. Issues with the existing station were that the nearby subway's clearance of 3.8 metres (12 ft) was too low, causing trucks to frequently hit it; the station and surrounding area was run-down; and that there was a shortage of parking at the station.

In the lead up to the 2016 Australian federal election, the Labor Party promised to spend A$1 million on a structure plan to look at rebuilding the station underground, in addition to the $120,000 that was already spent by the City of Bayswater on the structure plan. Federal Labor candidate Tim Hammond said that the tunnelling works for the Forrestfield–Airport Link presented a “once-in-a-lifetime” opportunity for rebuilding Bayswater station underground as well. Labor ended up losing that election, and so the $1 million was not spent on the structure plan.

Before the 2017 Western Australian state election, the Labor Party promised $40 million for upgrading Bayswater station as part of their Metronet project, in addition to the $7 million that was already allocated to the station from the Forrestfield–Airport Link budget. They said that sinking the station was an option they would consider. Labor later won the election, setting into motion the planning for the Bayswater station upgrade.

==== Planning ====
The scope and constraints for the Bayswater station rebuild were revealed on 8 April 2018. The project's budget had increased to $86 million; construction was scheduled to start in 2019, and finish by the end of 2020, before the opening of the Forrestfield–Airport Link. The plan revealed that Bayswater station will become an elevated station, which would increase the height of the bridge over King William Street/Coode Street from 3.8 metres (12 ft) to at least 4.8 metres (16 ft), and create a public space below the railway. The platforms will be 150 metres (490 ft) long, or long enough to fit a six-car train, whereas the existing station is only long enough for a four-car train. The platforms will also be relocated west to pass over King William Street/Coode Street. This allows the station to be on a straight section of track, keeping the gap between the platform and train to a minimum. This also allows there to be station entrances on both sides of those roads, improving access to the station. The scope also includes a turnback siding between Bayswater and Meltham stations, to be used during partial line shutdowns.

The elevated station was planned to have two platform faces, with contingency for expansion to four platform faces if needed for the Ellenbrook line. The new station was planned to be built immediately south of the rail corridor and existing station, to minimise the impact on services during construction. The two extra platforms were planned to be built where the existing station is, after the new station became operational and the old station is demolished. It was later confirmed in August 2019 that the two additional platform faces would be included in the project's scope, as the Ellenbrook line was confirmed to branch off from the Midland line at Bayswater. This will make Bayswater station the largest railway station in Perth outside the Perth central business district. Sinking the station was ruled out, as it would require the rebuild or closure of Meltham station; it would cause major disruption to the Midland line, with services cancelled for a significant amount of time; the design of the Forrestfield–Airport Link tunnel portal in Bayswater precluded sinking Bayswater station; and the regional diesel trains that run along the Midland line, such as the Indian Pacific and Prospector, would require complex ventilation in a tunnel.

The December 2018 concept design, which was favourably compared to the May 2020 concept design

Following the reveal of the scope and constraints, Metronet undertook what they said was the most extensive community consultation process for a railway station development in Perth, which included the formation of a community advisory group for the concept design, the survey of 972 people, and hosting community drop-in sessions, which 300 people attended. Following the community consultation, a concept design was revealed on 1 December 2018. The project cost was increased to $146 million. Aside from the parameters previously revealed, the concept design included a redesign of the roads around the station, and a public space north of the station where community events could take place. The redesigned road network includes linking Whatley Crescent directly to Beechboro Road South by a second road under the railway, east of the station. The section of Whatley Crescent around the station would be levelled, to allow it to pass under the railway. This meant that it would be cut off from the eastern part of Whatley Crescent. The reworked road network enabled buses to terminate and loop around at the station without having to use local residential streets, something that the existing station did not have. All car parking bays on the south side of the station were planned to be removed, leaving just the small amount on the north side.

Local residents and community groups criticised the concept design for the size of the bus interchange, the disconnection of Whatley Crescent, the need to remove significant trees, and that the station would be surrounded on all sides by roads. Community group Future Bayswater proposed an alternative road layout, that had the intersection of Whatley Crescent, Railway Parade, King William Street, and Coode Street underneath the station overpass, removing the need for Beechboro Road South to pass under the railway to the east of the station. The alternative design also had Whatley Crescent east of King William Street be a shared space or shared street, allowing local residents to drive through but helping to allay the problem that the station is surrounded on four sides by roads.

A request for proposal was released on 11 April 2019 for the design and construction of the station. At that stage, contract award and the beginning of construction were still planned for the end of 2019. The request for proposal closed the following month. In August 2019, two proponents were shortlisted for receiving the contract to design and built the station: the Better Bayswater Alliance, consisting of Georgiou Group and Lendlease, and the Evolve Bayswater Alliance, consisting of Coleman Rail and Decmil.

==== Early works and further planning ====
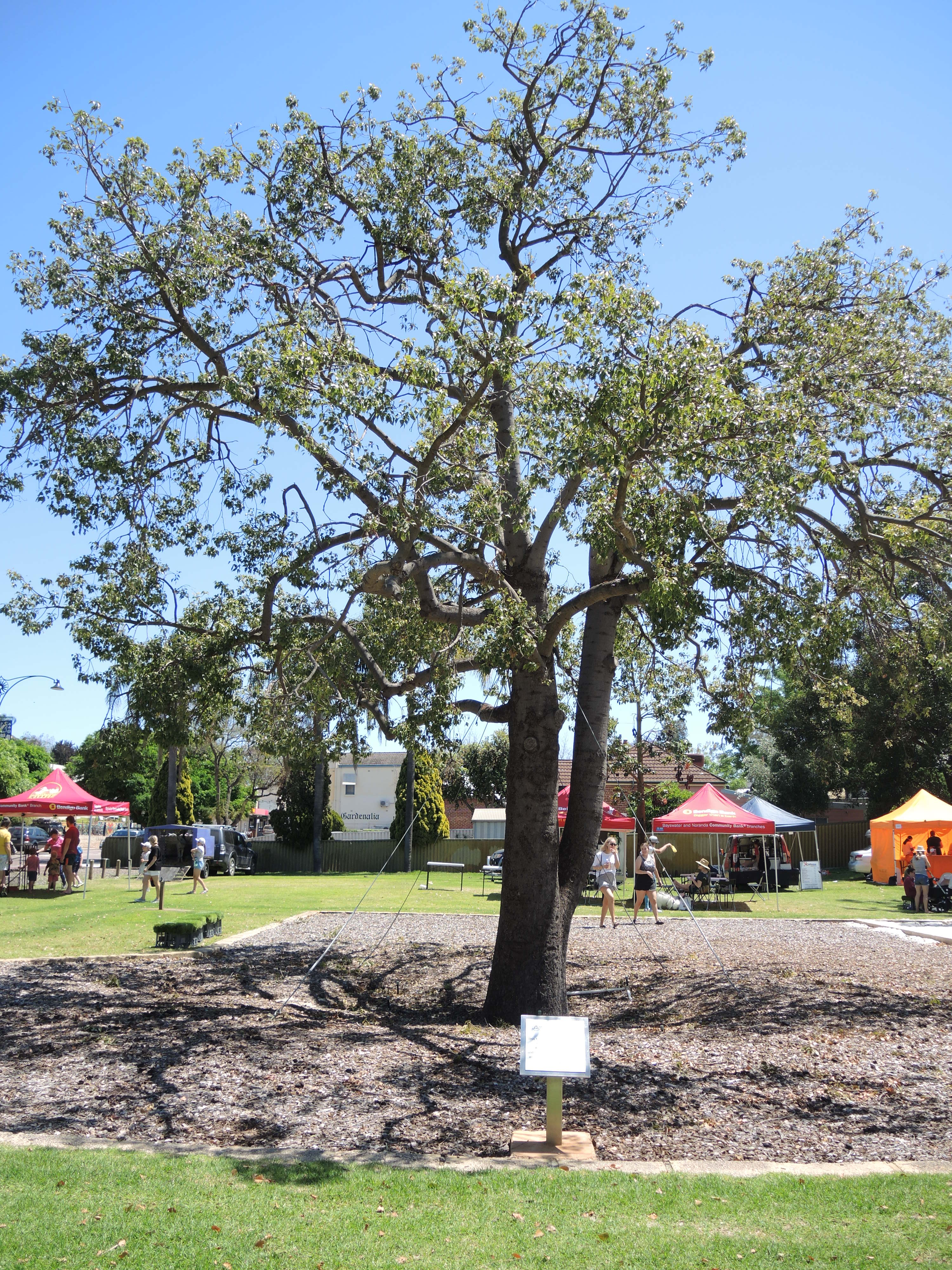
Kurrajong tree after relocation at Bert Wright Park

Early works on the station began in late 2019, with the relocation of underground cables in the vicinity of the station. In January 2020, a kurrajong tree was relocated by a crane from Bayswater station to Bert Wright Park. The tree, which was 80 years old at the time, was deemed too significant to cut down, so it was instead relocated. The process started in May 2019, when arborists started trimming the tree's roots. The relocation took place on 9 January 2020, using one crane to lift the 17-tonne (37-thousand-pound) tree and another crane to move the tree 200 metres (660 ft) down King William Street to the park.

To offset the 180 car parking bays planned to be removed from Bayswater station, 100 parking bays were added to Meltham station, and 83 parking bays were added to Ashfield station. Parking was also made free at Ashfield, as that station is in fare zone two, as opposed to Bayswater and Meltham in fare zone one. To make those stations more attractive to use, starting in July 2019, stopping patterns were removed on the Midland line, making all trains stop at those stations. The $1.6 million contract to design and build those carparks was awarded to Westforce Construction in October 2019. Construction on the carparks started in February 2020 and was completed in October 2020.

On 9 April 2020, Evolve Bayswater was announced to be the preferred proponent. The budget was increased to $253 million as well, due to the additional platforms being included in the project's scope. The contract was signed with Evolve Bayswater Alliance on 19 May 2020. Decmil took a $25 million stake in the project, and Coleman Rail took the rest. On the same day as the signing of the contract, new and more detailed concept designs were released. The concept designs were criticised by local residents, saying it differed significantly from the curvy and elegant original concept design from 2018. They said the design looked like a "bulky freeway overpass", and compared the design of the platform shelters to a Bunnings trestle table. The lack of escalators was also criticised, although the design did include lifts. Paul Shanahan, chairman of Future Bayswater, said the design lacked architectural merit and had become a "social media joke". Opposition transport spokesperson Libby Mettam said that "despite months of community consultation over the design and aesthetics, the final plan has been compared to four trestle tables slapped on top of a freeway overpass". Even the member for Maylands and government MP Lisa Baker privately criticised the design to Rita Saffioti, the Minister for Transport.

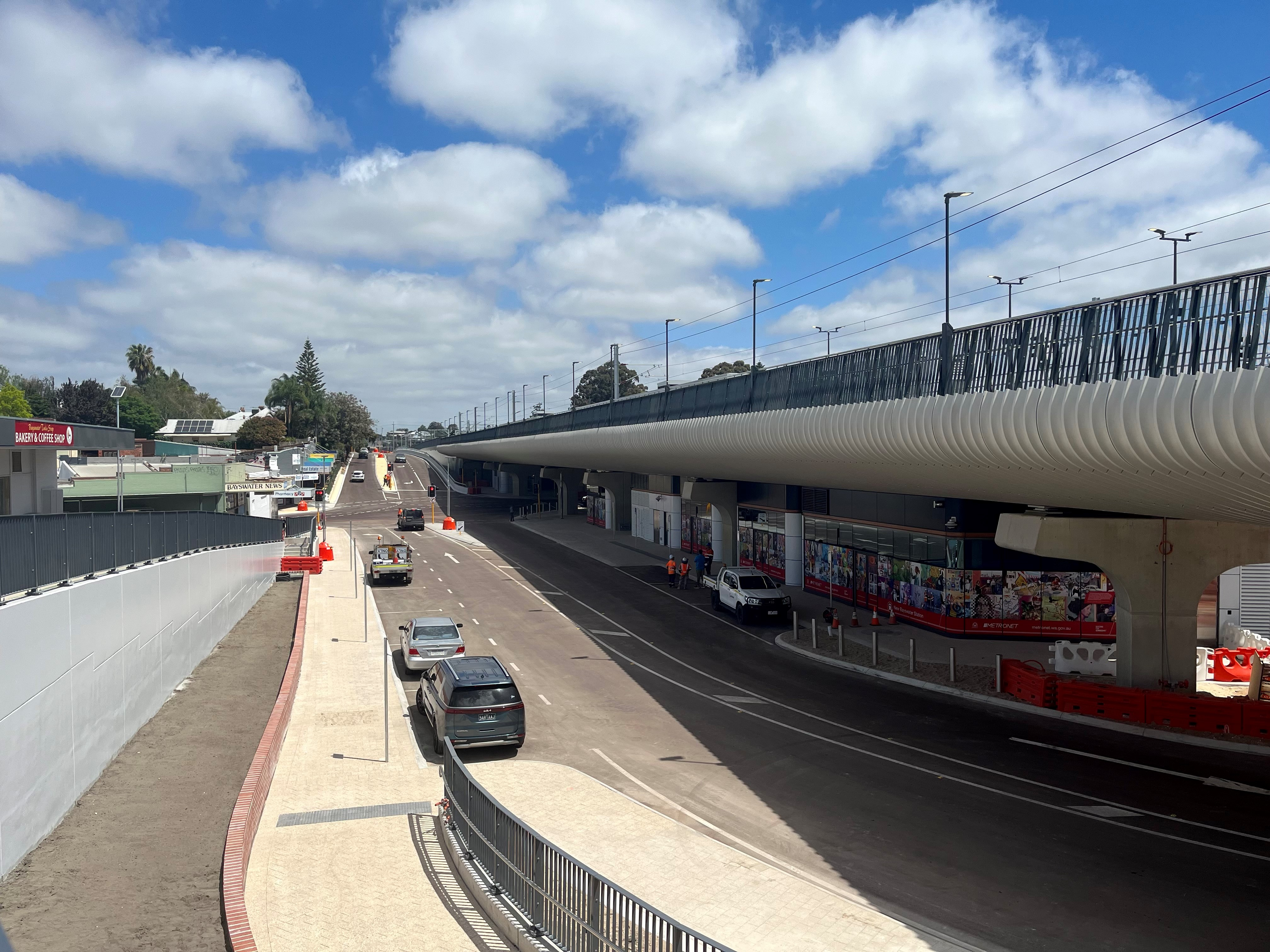
Corrugated iron finish on the bridge which is designed to mimic the metal fluting on a Transperth A-series train.

A new design was released in October 2020, which included escalators, redesigned platform shelters, and a corrugated iron finish on the bridge designed to mimic the metal fluting on a Transperth A-series train. The new shelters in the design cover 70% of the platform, and have vertical screens to reduce wind. The design has one escalator to each pair of platforms, in addition to the two stairs and lifts to each platform. Community members said the design was an improvement on the May 2020 concept design, but criticism of the road layout had yet to be addressed by the government.

==== Construction ====
Just before Christmas 2020, the development application for the station received conditional approval from the Western Australian Planning Commission (WAPC). This allowed construction to commence in January 2021. During that month, the number of lanes on Whatley Crescent was reduced, and on-street parking was removed. The Principal Shared Path parallel to the railway line was relocated onto Whatley Crescent. The closure of the carparks south of the railway occurred after that, and then earthworks began. Local businesses complained about the lack of parking, saying that had gone down since the removal of parking on Whatley Crescent. In May 2021, Metronet provided $236,000 to the City of Bayswater to build 20 temporary parking bays.

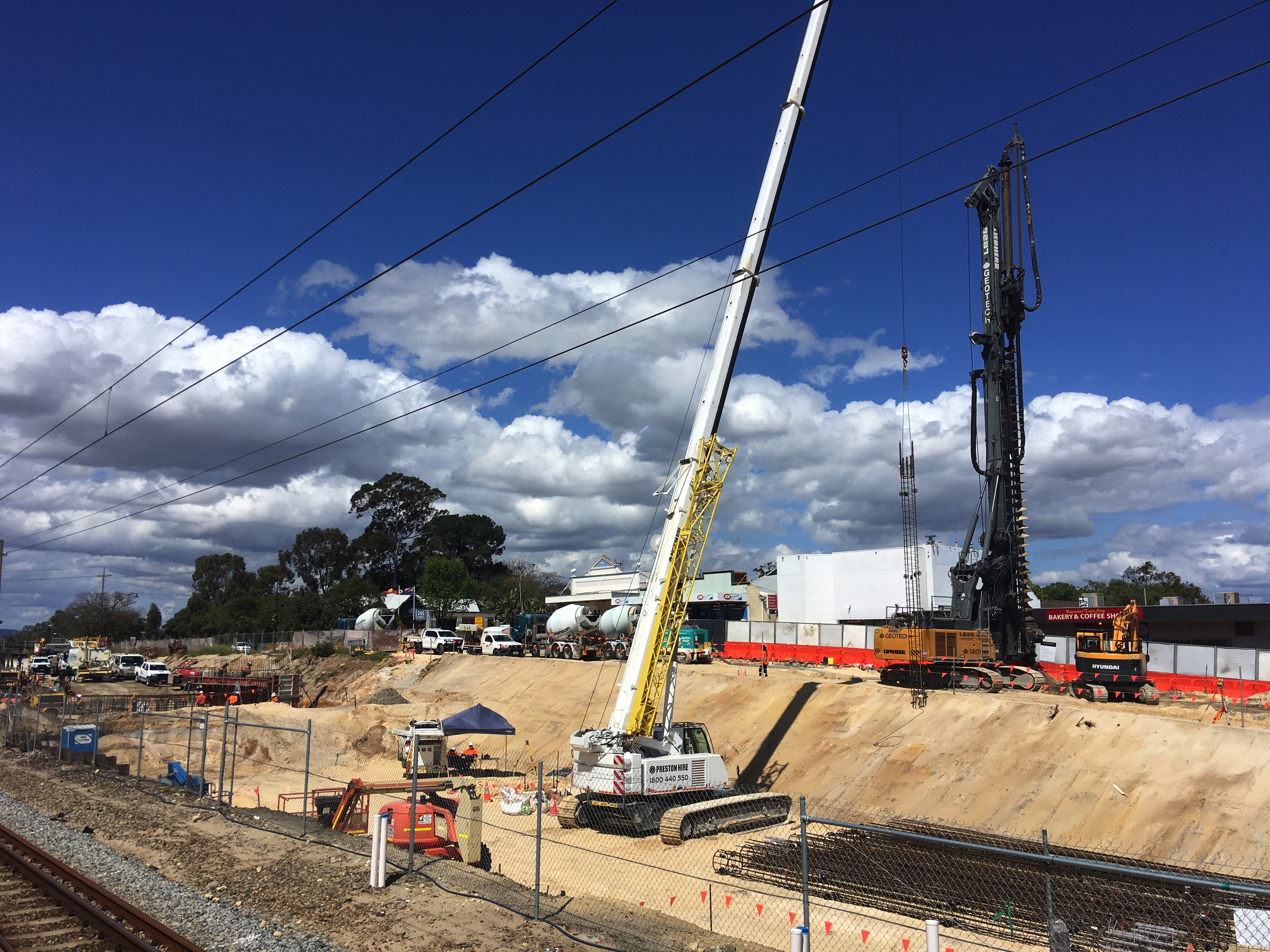
Piling works for a retaining wall in October 2021

Vibrations and loud noise have been an issue during construction, especially during the piling works between April and July 2021. Many local residents have been unable to sleep and have had cracks appear in their houses. Evolve Bayswater provided a small compensation payment to some residents. Residents and businesses have also made complaints about construction staff using parking meant for customers, although the Public Transport Authority has debunked those claims. Construction staff have been verbally abused by the general public. Surveys undertaken by the Public Transport Authority show that the Bayswater station project has an 80% approval rating in the area, however there is a small, vocal group of people who are negative about it.

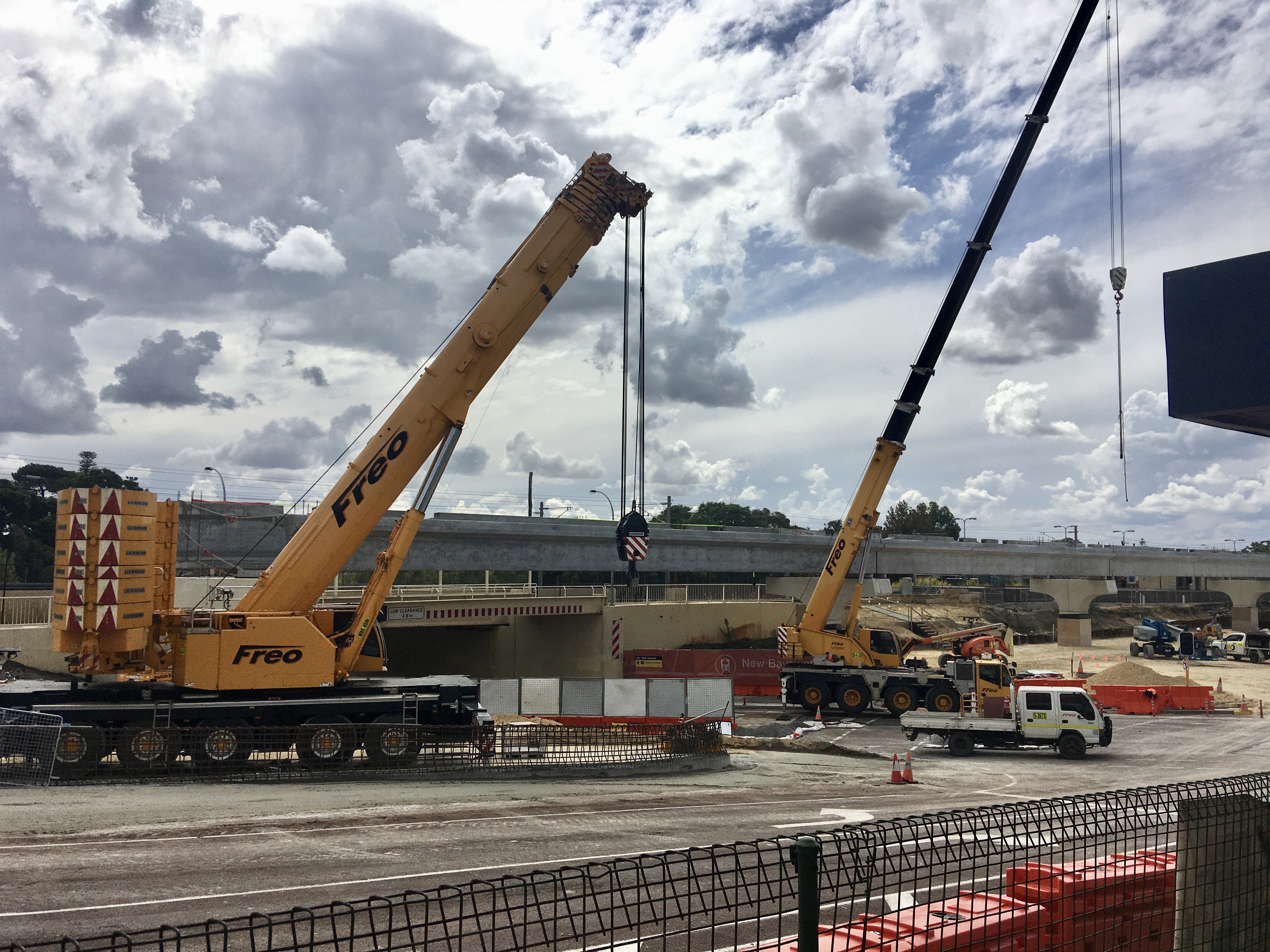
Twelve out of 52 bridge beams had been installed by April 2022

The installation of bridge pillars began in September 2021. The first two out of 52 bridge beams were installed in late February 2022. More bridge beams were installed in the months following that, and by 13 April 2022, twelve beams had been installed. By the end of July, all bridge beams for the first stage of the project were in place. The Airport line opened on 9 October 2022. In November 2022, Firm Construction, a subcontractor that was responsible for the construction of the station building, was stripped of its contract after the state government intervened. Firm Construction was responsible for approximately ten percent of the overall project. Firm Construction went into voluntary administration days later. The state government said that the collapse of the subcontractor would not impact the overall timeframe of the project.

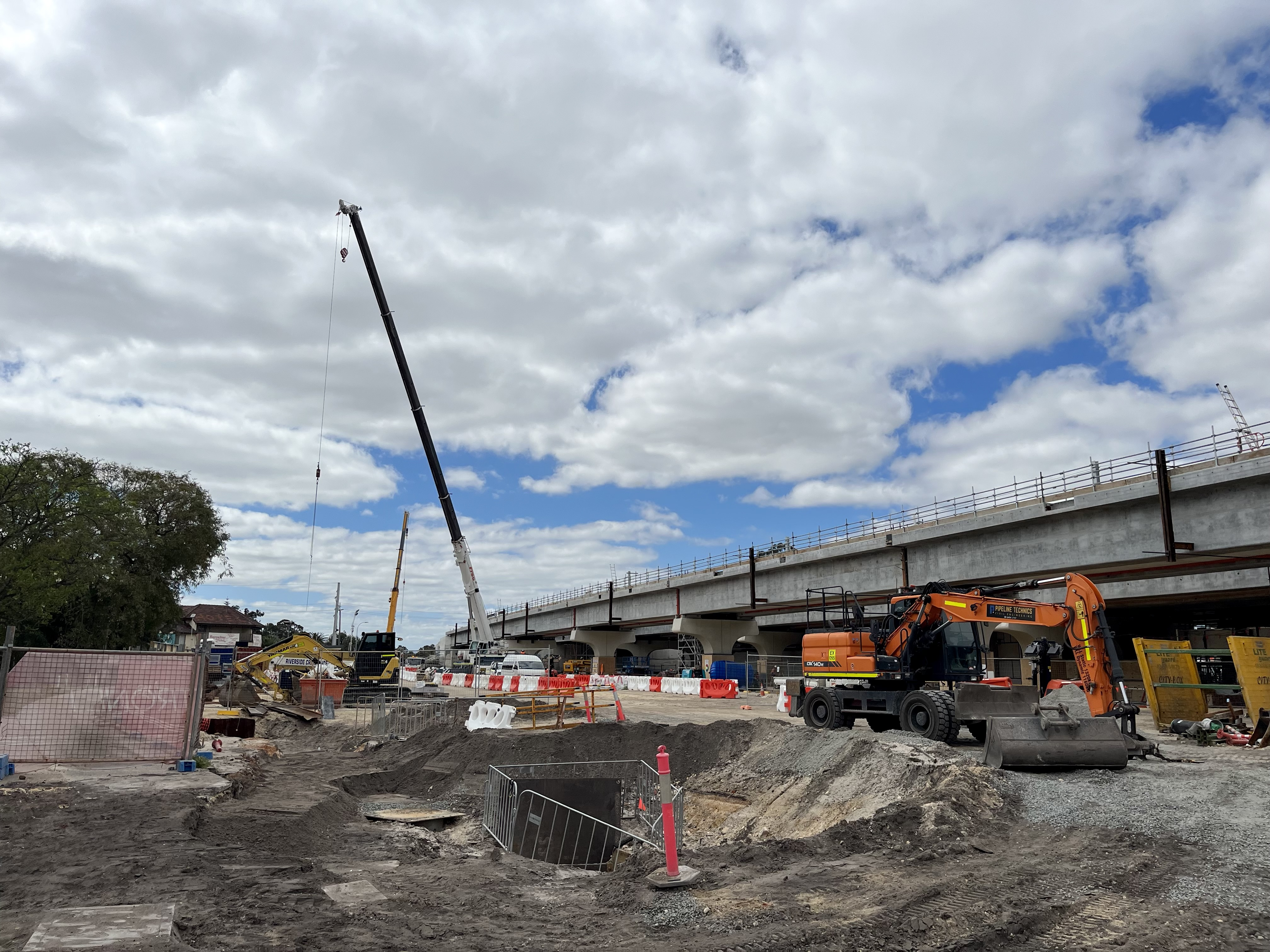
Construction on the northern half of the station in September 2023

The first half of the new station was originally going to open following a shutdown of the line from 23 September to 16 October 2022. In August, this was delayed to January 2023 as a result of supply chain disruptions, with the possibility of it being delayed again to April 2023 left open. In February 2023, it was confirmed that the Airport and Midland lines would close between 31 March and 26 April and that the bridge would be demolished between 14 and 17 April. The previous station permanently closed at the start of the shutdown and was demolished by 3 April. A free shuttle bus ran between Bayswater and Meltham while the station was closed and a community event to celebrate the Bayswater Bridge was held on 30 April. The shutdown involved demolishing the previous station and bridge, replacing 1.8 kilometres (1.1 mi) of track, expanding the Leake Street pedestrian underpass, construction of the turnback siding, piling works for the two northern bridges and piling works for the Ellenbrook line viaduct. Local businesses, including the Bayswater Traders Association, asked the state government to reconsider the length of the station's closure and the staging of associated road closures and have threatened a mass compensation claim for lost business.

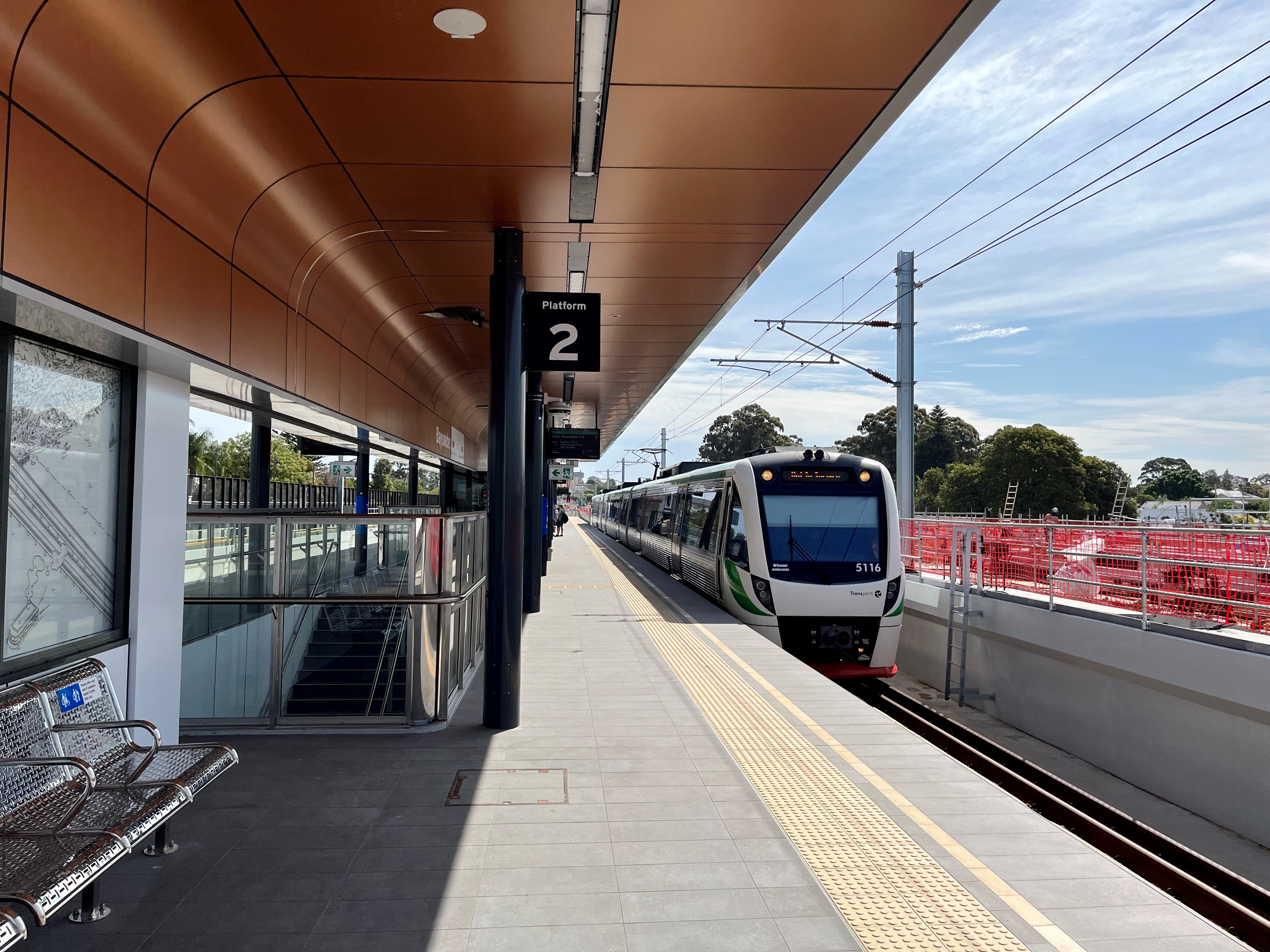
Bayswater station platform in October 2023 with a Transperth B-series train

In the May 2023 state budget, a $107.4 million cost overrun for the Bayswater station project was revealed. The first half of the new station was planned to open in September 2023, eventually opening on 8 October 2023. The second half of the station opened on 8 April 2024, following a shutdown of the Airport and Midland lines between 28 March and 8 April 2024, where the eastbound track was realigned to platform four of Bayswater station. A community street festival was held on 21 April 2024 to celebrate the completion of the station, and on 22 April 2024, the new bus interchange began operations, with several bus routes rerouted via Bayswater station. The opening of platforms two and three were delayed until the opening of the Ellenbrook line, which occurred on 8 December 2024.

==== Metronet East Redevelopment Area ====
In June 2019, DevelopmentWA began the process of expanding the Midland Redevelopment Area to include the areas surrounding Bayswater station and High Wycombe station, renaming it the Metronet East Redevelopment Area. DevelopmentWA said the purpose of the redevelopment area was to "maximise development opportunities arising from the station upgrades and help create a well-designed and connected community hub." The boundaries of the area were formally established in May 2020. A draft redevelopment scheme for Metronet East was released in August 2020. The redevelopment scheme was formally adopted in May 2021, transferring planning authority from the City of Bayswater and the WAPC to DevelopmentWA.

== Services ==
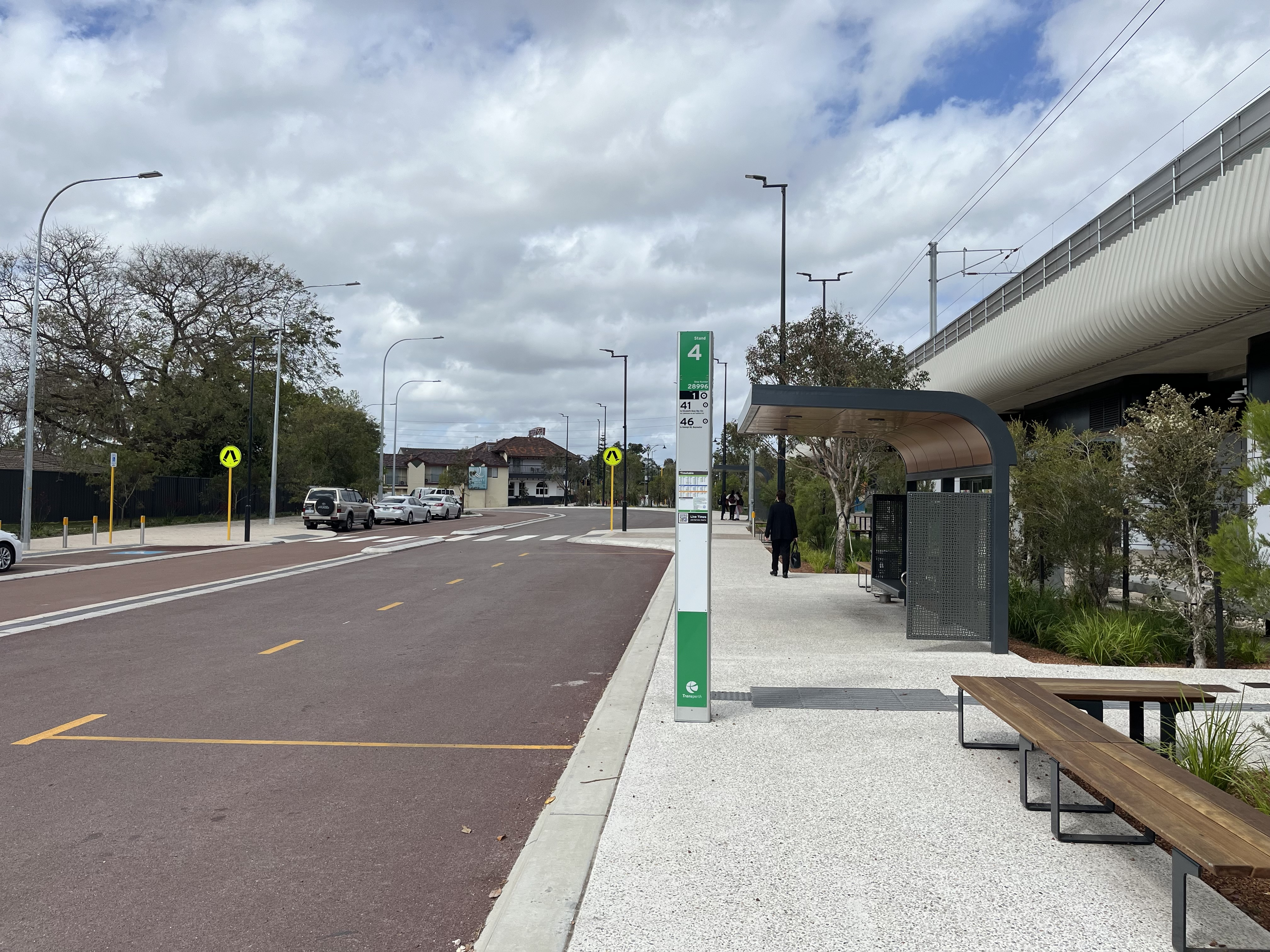
Bus interchange on Railway Parade

Bayswater station is served by the Airport, Ellenbrook and Midland lines. Midland Line trains run from Perth to Midland and continue as a through service to Fremantle at Perth. Airport Line trains run from Perth to High Wycombe via Perth Airport and continue to Claremont at Perth. Ellenbrook Line trains run from Perth to Ellenbrook and terminate at Perth, running Not In Service to Daglish station to use the siding turnback.

Airport, Ellenbrook and Midland Line trains each stop at Bayswater station every twelve minutes during peak on weekdays and every fifteen minutes during the day outside peak and on weekends and public holidays. This makes for a combined peak frequency of a train every four minutes between Bayswater and Perth. Late at night, trains on each line are half-hourly or hourly. When the Ellenbrook line opens, services on that line will stop every twelve minutes during peak. It is planned that by 2031, services on each of the three lines will be every ten minutes during peak. The station saw 527,269 passengers in the 2013–14 financial year.

Bayswater station has seven regular bus routes. Route 40, travels between Elizabeth Quay Bus Station and Galleria Bus Station, Route 41, travels between Elizabeth Quay Bus Station and Bayswater Station via Guildford Road, Route 45 travels between the Bassendean Town Centre and Baywater Station via Ashfield, Route 46 travels between Morley Station and Bayswater Station and Route 975 operates as a high frequency routes between Warwick Station and Bayswater Station via Galleria and Mirrabooka Bus Stations. The CircleRoute 998/999 also operate at Bayswater to Fremantle Station and Galleria Bus Station respectively, and the Rail Replacement bus stops moved further closer to the station on the east side on Railway Parade.
