= Karrakatta, Western Australia =

Karrakatta
- Suburb
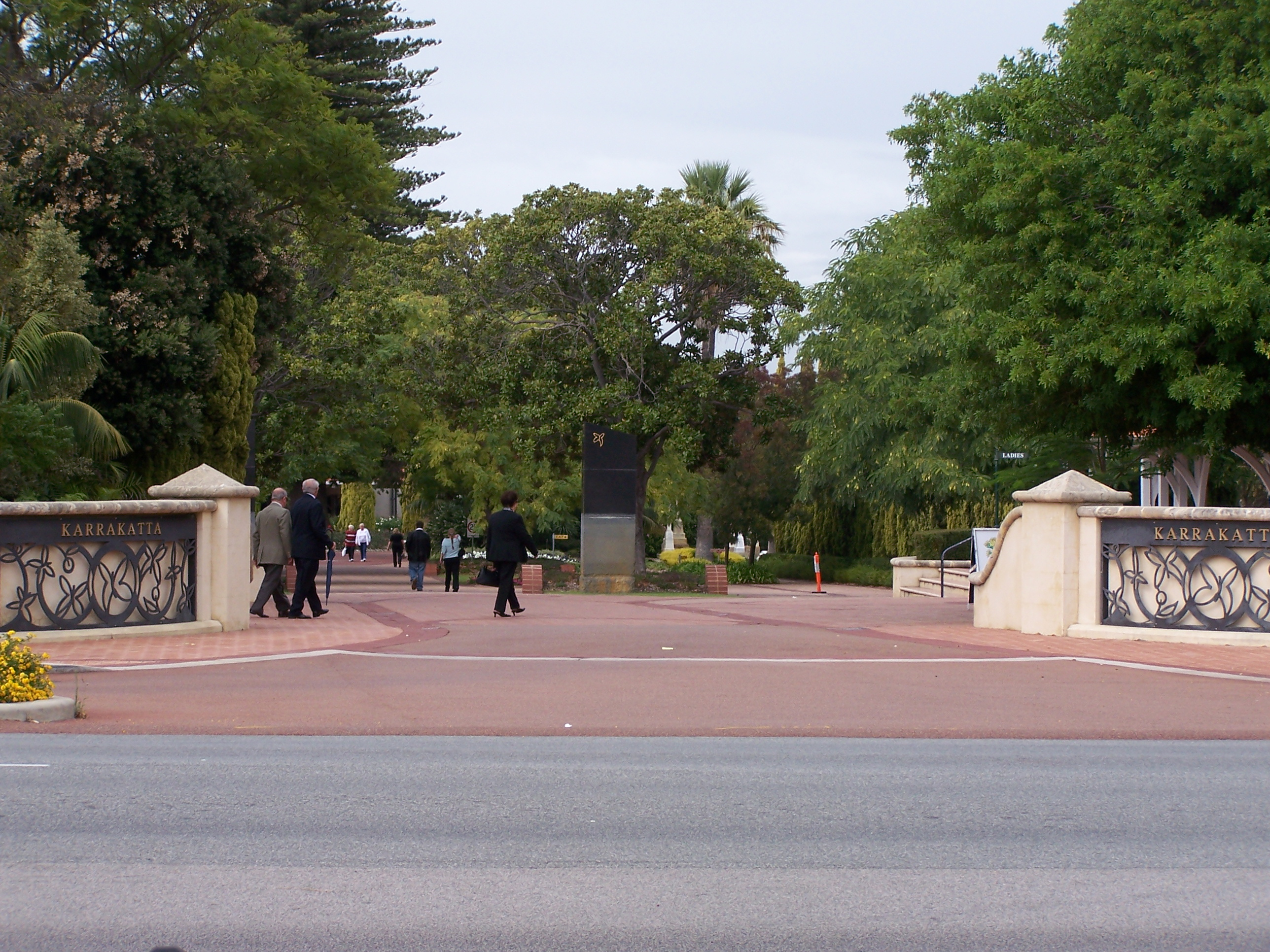
- Main entrance to Karrakatta Cemetery
- Interactive map of Karrakatta
- Coordinates: 31.968°S 115.801°E
- Country: Australia
- State: Western Australia
- City: Perth
- LGA: City of Nedlands
- Location: 8 km (5.0 mi) WSW of Perth CBD

Government
  - State electorate: Nedlands
  - Federal division: Curtin

Population
  - Total: 22 (SAL 2021)
- Postcode: 6010
Suburbs around Karrakatta
Mount Claremont	Shenton Park	Shenton Park
Mount Claremont	Karrakatta	Nedlands
Claremont	Nedlands	Nedlands

Karrakatta is a suburb of Perth, Western Australia, located within the City of Nedlands and 7 km west of the central business district. Its postcode is 6010.

Karrakatta is composed of two distinct areas, due to the Fremantle railway line passing through the suburb. On the south side is Karrakatta Cemetery, which began service in 1899, with a small industrial area occupied by monument builders, associated companies and the depot for City of Nedlands.

The other area north of the railway line and Karrakatta railway station is occupied by the Australian Defence Force's Irwin Army Barracks.

== Etymology ==
The meaning of the name Karrakatta is disputed. Historical records from the founding of the Karrakatta Club, the oldest women's club in Australia, indicate the name was chosen based on the belief that it was an Aboriginal word meaning "hill of fire".

However, linguistic research into Noongar placenames suggests alternative derivations. Forster notes that the name more likely originates from words for "spider" (kara) or "crab" (karri), combined with katta (meaning "head" or "hill"). This yields possible meanings of "hill of the spiders" or "hill of crabs", aligning with the area's topography and fauna.

== Transport ==
=== Bus ===
- 25 Claremont Station to Shenton Park Station – serves Smyth Road
- 27 Claremont Station to East Perth – serves Brockway Road

=== Rail ===
- Fremantle/Airport Line
  - Karrakatta Station
  - Loch Street Station

== See also ==
- Karrakatta Club
