= Railways in Perth =

Public transport system serving Perth, Western Australia

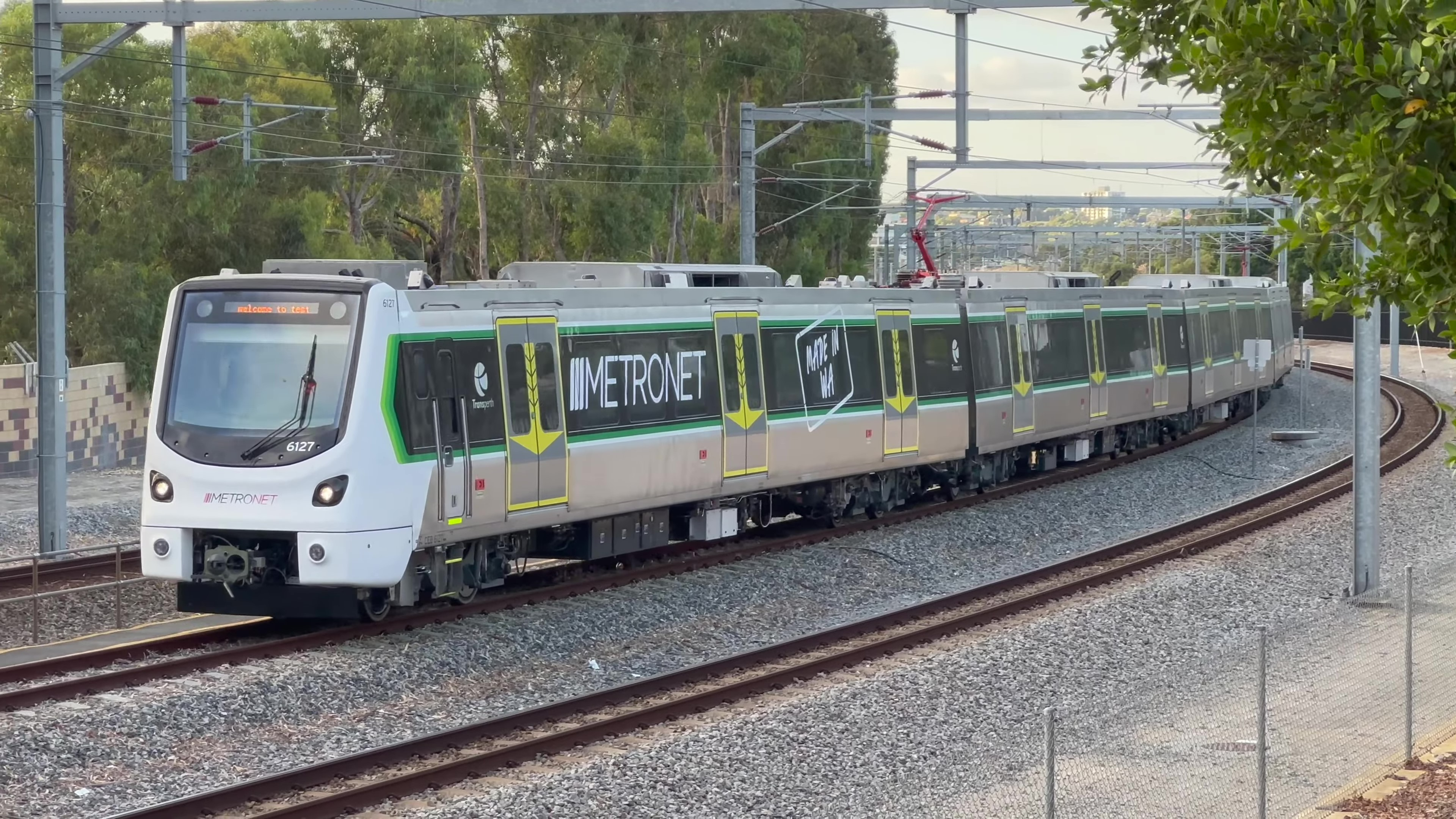
- A C-series train

Overview
- Owner: Public Transport Authority (2003–present)
- Locale: Perth, Mandurah and surrounds
- Transit type: Heavy rail, commuter rail
- Number of lines: 8
- Number of stations: 86 (Note: 85 stations if Perth station and Perth Underground station are counted as the same station.)
- Annual ridership: 73,749,274 (year to June 2026)
- Headquarters: Public Transport Centre

Operation
- Began operation: 1881
- Operators: Department of Works and Railways (1877–1890); WAGR (1890–2003); Public Transport Authority (2003–present)
- Number of vehicles: 354 railcars

Technical
- System length: 244.6 kilometres (152.0 mi)
- Track gauge: 1,067 mm (3 ft 6 in) narrow gauge
- Electrification: 25 kV 50 Hz AC from overhead catenary
- Top speed: 130 kilometres per hour (81 mph)

Railways in Perth, the capital city of Western Australia, have existed since 1881, when the Eastern Railway was opened between Fremantle and Guildford. Today, Perth has eight Transperth suburban railway lines and 86 railway stations.

The Transperth network is owned and operated by the WA Public Transport Authority (PTA) and consists of eight lines: the Airport, Armadale, Ellenbrook, Fremantle, Mandurah, Midland, Thornlie–Cockburn, and Yanchep lines. Perth's trains had 53.2 million boardings in the 2022–23 financial year, giving the Transperth rail network the third highest patronage out of all of Australia's suburban rail networks.

A notable feature of Perth's urban rail network is that a significant portion of it operates in the median of freeways, with dedicated bus-train interchanges and extensive Park & Ride (P&R) facilities provided at certain stations. Passengers arrive on feeder buses or use P&R and transfer to trains at railway stations. These system design features are a response to Perth's low density.

== History ==
The Eastern Railway was the first railway to be constructed in the Perth metropolitan area. It travelled from Fremantle to Guildford via Perth and opened in 1881. It was first proposed in 1871 following the success of railways in Sydney and Melbourne. In 1874, two possible routes were suggested: one traveling north of the Swan River via Perth and one travelling south of the river with a branch line to Perth. The Department of Works and Railways was formed in 1877. The northern route was chosen in July 1878, and the contract for the construction of the railway was awarded to John Robb at a cost of £74,591/19/5 later that year. Governor Harry Ord turned the first sod on 3 June 1879, coinciding with the 50th anniversary of British settlement of Western Australia.

The railway was operable as far east as Perth station by 9 October 1880 and on 1 March 1881, the railway was officially opened between Fremantle and Guildford by Governor William Robinson. The initial timetable was five trains per day from Fremantle, two terminating at Perth and three terminating at Guildford. There was a severe shortage of rolling stock, and so the trains operated simultaneously as passenger and goods trains. A contract was awarded to J. W. Wright for £53,043 for the extension of the line to Chidlow. This extension opened to traffic on 11 March 1884. Suburban trains terminated at Guildford still.

The railway was initially just single tracked with the only passing loop being at Perth. Another passing loop was built at Claremont in 1885, and soon after, sidings were built at Guildford. In 1886, a branch line opened in Bayswater to the Swan River foreshore near Ascot Racecourse (known then as Perth Racecourse).

The South Western Railway between Perth and Bunbury opened on 2 May 1893.

On 21 February 1896, a 20-kilometre (12 mi) new route for the Eastern Railway between Midland Junction and Mount Helena via Swan View opened. It had a lower gradient than the first route and upon opening, it became the main line with the old route being relegated. The maximum grade of the new route was 1:40 whereas the maximum grade of the old route was 1:29. The new route featured the Swan View Tunnel, the first rail tunnel in Western Australia.

Suburban trains on the Eastern Railway were extended to Midland Junction when the Midland Railway Workshops opened in 1904/5. By 1906, suburban trains ran as far as Bellevue on the Eastern Railway and as far as Maddington on the South Western Railway. Kelmscott and Armadale were considered country towns and were served by the less frequent trains to Bunbury.

18 WAGR ADG class railcars were added to the network in 1954, marking the first time that diesel trains were used for suburban services. As they had a higher acceleration, more closely spaced stations were able to be built, and so on 28 November 1954, seven new stations opened: Ashfield station on the Midland line; Grant Street, Loch Street and Victoria Street stations on the Fremantle line; and Beckenham (known then as Higham), Oats Street and Stokely stations on the Armadale line. Headways at this time were 20 minutes on the Fremantle and Midland lines and 40 minutes on the Armadale line. The introduction of diesel railcars reduced the time to get to Perth from Fremantle, Bellevue or Armadale, and resulted in an increase in patronage. In 1953–54, there were 7.8 million boardings, which increased to 13.8 million five years later. This increase was only temporary though, with patronage dropping below 10 million per year in 1964 due to the widespread adoption of cars. By 5 October 1968, suburban services were fully operated by diesel railcars for the first time.

=== Decline ===
Until the 1950s, the urban development of Perth closely followed the train and tram lines, but following the advent of car-based planning, urban development began to stretch north and south where there were no railways or tramways. The 1955 Plan for the Metropolitan Region, Perth and Fremantle, also known as the Stephenson-Hepburn Report, reinforced this. The report proposed the construction of freeways throughout the Perth metropolitan area and for railways to Morley and Whitfords. When the Metropolitan Region Scheme was adopted in 1963, reserves were set for the freeways but not the railways. Over the following decades, rail patronage declined and the system fell into disrepair.

In 1970, the Perth Regional Transport Study recommended that the rail system be replaced with busways, but the subsequent Tonkin government decided against this after looking at public opinion on this. In 1978, the Rail and Bus Policies for the Fremantle Corridor report recommended that the Fremantle line close and be replaced with buses. On 2 September 1979, the Fremantle line was controversially closed to passenger services by the Charles Court Liberal government. A group named the "Friends of the Railways" was formed to advocate against the closure. Following the closure, the Fremantle corridor saw a 30 percent drop in patronage and a petition with over 100,000 signatures was presented to parliament. The Liberal government was defeated in the 1983 state election and several months later, the Fremantle line reopened on 29 July 1983.

=== Revival ===
Soon after the Fremantle line reopened, the state government decided to investigate electrifying the network. It confirmed plans to electrify the network in 1985 and also announced it was investigating building a new transit line to the northern suburbs, what would later become the Joondalup line (now known as the Yanchep line). New engineering standards were developed to permit trains to fit into and safely run within freeway medians. Electrification commenced in 1989 and the new electric trains, now known as the Transperth A-series trains, commenced operations in September 1991.

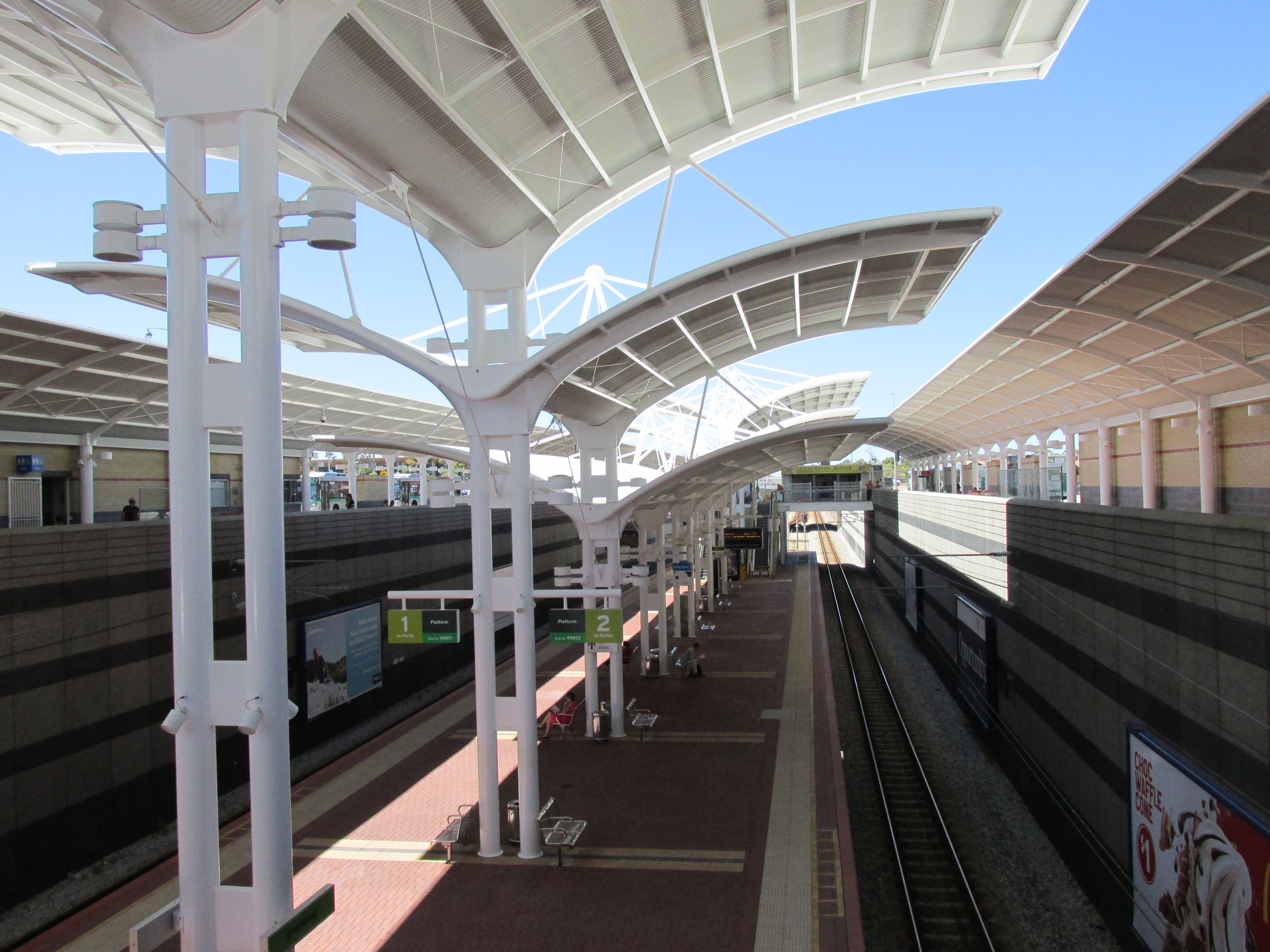
Joondalup station, which opened on 20 December 1992

The Northern Suburbs Rapid Transit Study investigated whether the northern suburbs should get bus rapid transit, light rail or heavy rail, among other options. The choice eventually settled on was for heavy rail, like the rest of the rail network. Construction on the Joondalup line began in 1990. The line mostly ran though the median of the Mitchell Freeway, deviating east at Joondalup. It had significantly wider station spacing than the original three lines and several stations were designed as bus-train interchanges. The line opened to partial service on 21 December 1992 with three stations operational (Leederville, Edgewater and Joondalup). All the stations along the line from Perth to Joondalup opened in March 1993, along with reforms to the bus network in the northern suburbs so that buses fed into interchanges along the railway. Later that year, the Joondalup line was extended to Currambine.

=== New MetroRail ===
Planning for the Mandurah line commenced soon after the Joondalup line opened. The first Transperth B-series trains arrived in June 2004 and the new Nowergup rail depot on the Joondalup line opened. The Joondalup line was extended to Clarkson station, opening on 4 October 2004. The Thornlie line, a spur off the Armadale line, opened on 7 August 2005. The Mandurah line opened on 23 December 2007. The Joondalup line was extended again to Butler, opening on 21 September 2014.

=== Metronet ===
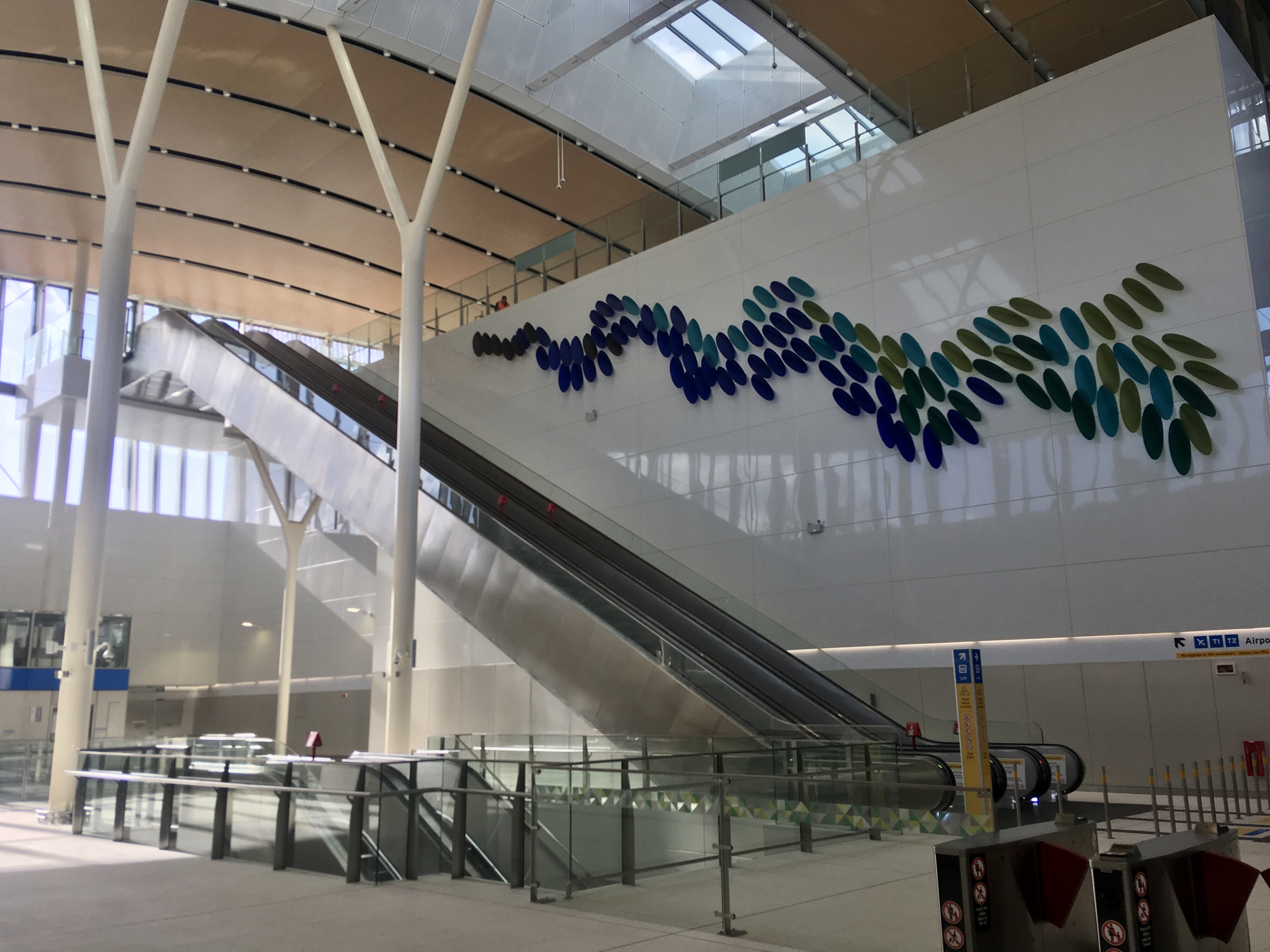
Airport Central station, which opened with the Airport line on 9 October 2022

Construction on the Forrestfield–Airport Link (FAL) began in November 2016. The FAL involved the construction of 11 kilometres (6.8 mi) of twin-bored tunnels to connect Perth Airport and Perth's eastern suburbs to the rail network. The FAL opened as the Airport line on 9 October 2022. The last Transperth B-series train entered service in mid-2019 as set 126.

The first Transperth C-series train, set 130 entered service on 8 April 2024 on the Mandurah and Yanchep lines.

The Joondalup line was extended from Butler to Yanchep. Construction for the extension began in mid-2020, and it opened on 14 July 2024, coinciding with the line's renaming to the Yanchep line.

Construction on the Ellenbrook line commenced in January 2022. The line opened on 8 December 2024, branching off from the Midland railway line at a reconstructed and improved Bayswater station.

Construction on the Thornlie–Cockburn Link to extend the Thornlie line to Cockburn Central on the Mandurah line commenced in 2019. This extension opened on 8 June 2025, becoming Perth's first orbital passenger railway connection.

The Victoria Park-Canning Level Crossing Removal Project commenced in November 2023. This project elevated the Armadale line between Victoria Park and Beckenham stations, removing six level crossings, rebuilding five stations and closing one permanently. (Note: Welshpool was not rebuilt following demolition due to lower projected patronage.) This project necessitated the closure of the Armadale and Thornlie lines between Victoria Park and both former termini for 18 months with services resuming to Cannington on the Armadale line on 8 June 2025.

The construction of the Byford Rail Extension began in November 2023. This project saw the Armadale line extended by 7.2 kilometres (4.5 mi) to a new terminus station at Byford, opening on 13 October 2025.

Works on constructing the New Midland Station began in July 2023. The new station provides a multi-storey carpark which opened on 20 January 2025, a new bus interchange with twelve stands, the new station will feature two 150 metres (490 ft) platforms for suburban services and one 135 metres (443 ft) platform for Transwa's regional trains. The new station opened on 22 February 2026.

== Management, operation and branding ==
Western Australian Government Railways (WAGR) was established in 1890 as the owner and operator of the railways, superseding the Department of Works and Railways.

The Tonkin government decided to restructure the operations of suburban transport, and so in 1974, the management of suburban rail services was placed with the Metropolitan (Perth) Passenger Transport Trust (MTT), the operator of bus services in Perth since 1958. The MTT contracted out the operation of rail services to WAGR, which was rebranded Westrail in September 1975. The MTT adopted Transperth as its trading name in August 1986.

In November 1992, the rail system was rebranded as Fastrak, but this rebranding was reverted around 1995. In 1993, management of the Transperth system was transferred to the Department of Transport with the aim of privatising the operation of the Transperth system.

WAGR underwent a restructuring in 2000 with the sale of its freight business to Australian Railroad Group. The WAGR Commission was created in December 2000 which operated the network under its Urban Passenger Division as part of an alliance agreement with the Transperth division of the Department of Transport. The Department of Transport merged with the Department of Planning in July 2001 to form the Department for Planning and Infrastructure. The Transperth division continued under the Department of Planning and Infrastructure.

On 1 July 2003, the WAGR Commission, Transperth, school bus services and regional bus services were merged to form the Public Transport Authority (PTA), which oversaw all public transport in Western Australia as one organisation for the first time. Services have since been managed by the PTA's Transperth division and operated by the PTA's Transperth Train Operations division under an internal service-level agreement.

== Lines ==
Transperth rail map, 2025

The Transperth rail network consists of eight lines. All lines meet at either Perth station or Perth Underground station, which are often considered to be one unified station. As of December 2025, the Transperth rail network is 244.3 kilometres (151.8 mi) long. Perth Underground station serves as the city terminus for the Mandurah and Yanchep line. Perth station serves as the city terminus for all other lines except the Airport line.

The Armadale, Fremantle and Midland lines are collectively known as the "heritage lines" because they were constructed long before the other lines were built. The heritage line stations are often situated closer together, have fewer facilities, fewer bus transfers, lower top track speeds, and lower patronage than the newer lines. These lines predominantly use A-series trains but are planned to be gradually transitioned to using B-series trains as the A-series fleet begin to retire.

The much newer Airport line and Ellenbrook line share a significant amount of track with the Midland line between Bayswater and Perth, and then the Airport line further share track as they through run with the Fremantle line as far as Claremont.

The Airport line has 20 stations, including both termini and runs between High Wycombe and Claremont via Perth Airport and Perth station. Between Bayswater and Perth, the Airport line shares track with the Midland and Ellenbrook lines, and between Perth and Claremont, the Airport line shares track with the Fremantle line. The maximum speed of the Airport line is 130 kilometres per hour (81 mph). The frequency of the Airport line is five trains per hour during peak and four trains per hour outside peak and on weekends.

The Armadale line runs between Perth and Byford and has 20 stations, including both termini. Between Perth and Beckenham the Armadale line shares track with the Thornlie-Cockburn line. The maximum speed of the Armadale line is 130 kilometres per hour (81 mph). The frequency of the Armadale line is four trains per hour during weekdays and two trains per hour at night on weekends.

The Ellenbrook line runs from Perth to Ellenbrook and has 13 stations, including both termini. Between Bayswater and Perth the line shares track with the Airport and Midland lines. The maximum speed of the Ellenbrook Line is 130 kilometres per hour (81 mph). The frequency of the Ellenbrook line is five trains per hour during peak and four trains per hour outside peak and on weekends.

The Fremantle line runs from Perth to Fremantle and has 17 stations, including both termini. Between Perth and Claremont the line shares track with the Airport line. The maximum speed of the Fremantle line is 90 kilometres per hour (56 mph). The frequency of the Fremantle, line is five trains per hour during peak and four trains per hour outside peak and on weekends.

The Mandurah line runs between Perth Underground and Mandurah and has 13 stations. Two of those stations are in the Perth CBD and the rest are suburban and have bus interchanges. The Mandurah Line operates as a through service with the Yanchep line, continuing North. The maximum speed of the Mandurah line is 130 kilometres per hour (81 mph). The frequency of the Mandurah line during peak is twelve trains per hour between Perth Underground and Cockburn, and six trains per hour beyond Cockburn to Mandurah. The frequency outside peak and on weekends is four trains per hour to Mandurah.

The Midland line runs from Perth to Midland and has 15 stations, including both termini. Between Bayswater and Perth the Midland line shares track with the Airport and Ellenbrook lines. The maximum speed of the Midland line is 100 kilometres per hour (62 mph). The frequency of the Midland line is five trains per hour during peak and four trains per hour outside peak and on weekends.

The Thornlie–Cockburn line runs from Perth to Cockburn Central via Thornlie, sharing track North of Kenwick to Perth with the Armadale line and South of the Glen Iris tunnel with the Mandurah line to Cockburn Central. This line has 15 stations including both termini. The maximum speed of the Thornlie-Cockburn branch is 130 kilometres per hour (81 mph). The frequency of the Thornlie–Cockburn line is four trains per hour all week, and two trains per hour in the early morning and late night.

The Yanchep line runs from Perth Underground (Note: Officially, the Yanchep line begins one station prior, at Elizabeth Quay railway station, and the station number statistics in the following sentence reflect this. However, for consistency, most regular commuters call Perth Underground the start of the Yanchep line. Ultimately, this does not matter, as the Yanchep line through-runs with the Mandurah Line, which serves Elizabeth Quay station anyway.) to Yanchep. It has 16 stations: two stations in the Perth CBD, 11 suburban stations with bus interchanges, and 3 suburban stations without bus interchanges. The maximum speed of the Yanchep line is 130 kilometres per hour (81 mph). The frequency of the Yanchep line during peak is twelve trains per hour between Perth and Whitfords and six trains per hour beyond Whitfords to Yanchep. The frequency outside peak and on weekends is four trains per hour.

Most of the Transperth network is segregated from non-Transperth trains. The exceptions are the Armadale line, which is used by Transwa's Australind train, the Midland line between East Perth and Midland, which is dual standard and narrow gauge allowing for it to be used by Transwa's AvonLink, MerredinLink, Prospector, and Indian Pacific, and the Fremantle line bridge across the Swan River, which is used by freight trains to access Fremantle Port.

Key

* Closures or Delays Only
† Special Events Only

Perth rail lines
Line	First service	Image	Length	Stations	Rolling stock
Fremantle line	1881 (electrified 1991)		19.0 km (11.8 mi)	17	Transperth A-series; Transperth B-series *
Midland line	1881 (electrified 1991)		16.4 km (10.2 mi)	15	Transperth A-series; Transperth B-series *
Armadale line	1893 (electrified 1991)		37.6 km (23.4 mi)	20	Transperth A-series; Transperth B-series *
Yanchep line	20 December 1992		54.5 km (33.9 mi)	16	Transperth B-series; Transperth C-series
Thornlie–Cockburn line	7 August 2005	View from bridge of two railway tracks merging into one as they leave the station	Branch: 17.4 km (10.8 mi); Total: 31.6 km (19.6 mi)	Branch: 3 Total: 15	Transperth A-series; Transperth B-series; Transperth C-series †
Mandurah line	23 December 2007		70.1 km (43.6 mi)	13	Transperth B-series; Transperth C-series
Airport line	9 October 2022		Branch: 8.6 km (5.3 mi); Total: 25.2 km (15.7 mi)	Branch: 3 Total: 20	Transperth B-series
Ellenbrook line	8 December 2024		Branch: 21 km (13 mi); Total: 27.9 km (17.3 mi)	Branch: 5 Total: 13	Transperth A-series; Transperth B-series

== Infrastructure ==
Perth's suburban railways use 1,067 mm (3 ft 6 in) narrow gauge track, except for the Midland line between East Perth and Midland, which uses dual gauge track as regional train services use standard gauge. The Airport line branch, the Ellenbrook line branch, the Mandurah line, the Thornlie-Cockburn branch, and the Yanchep line have a maximum speed of 130 kilometres per hour (81 mph); the Armadale and Midland lines have a maximum speed of 100 kilometres per hour (62 mph); and the Fremantle line has a maximum speed of 90 kilometres per hour (56 mph). Trains are powered by 25 kV 50 Hz AC overhead line equipment. In the Airport line and Perth City Link tunnels, where space is limited, a rigid overhead conductor rail is used.

Perth's suburban railways use fixed block signalling. As part of Metronet's High Capacity Signalling Project, the network will be upgraded to moving block signalling using communications-based train control (CBTC). As of 2021, the CBTC system is planned to be implemented on the Airport, Midland and Fremantle lines by June 2027, the Yanchep and Mandurah lines by 2029, and the Armadale and Thornlie–Cockburn lines by 2031. This will allow for up to 30 trains per hour on some sections of the network.

== Stations ==
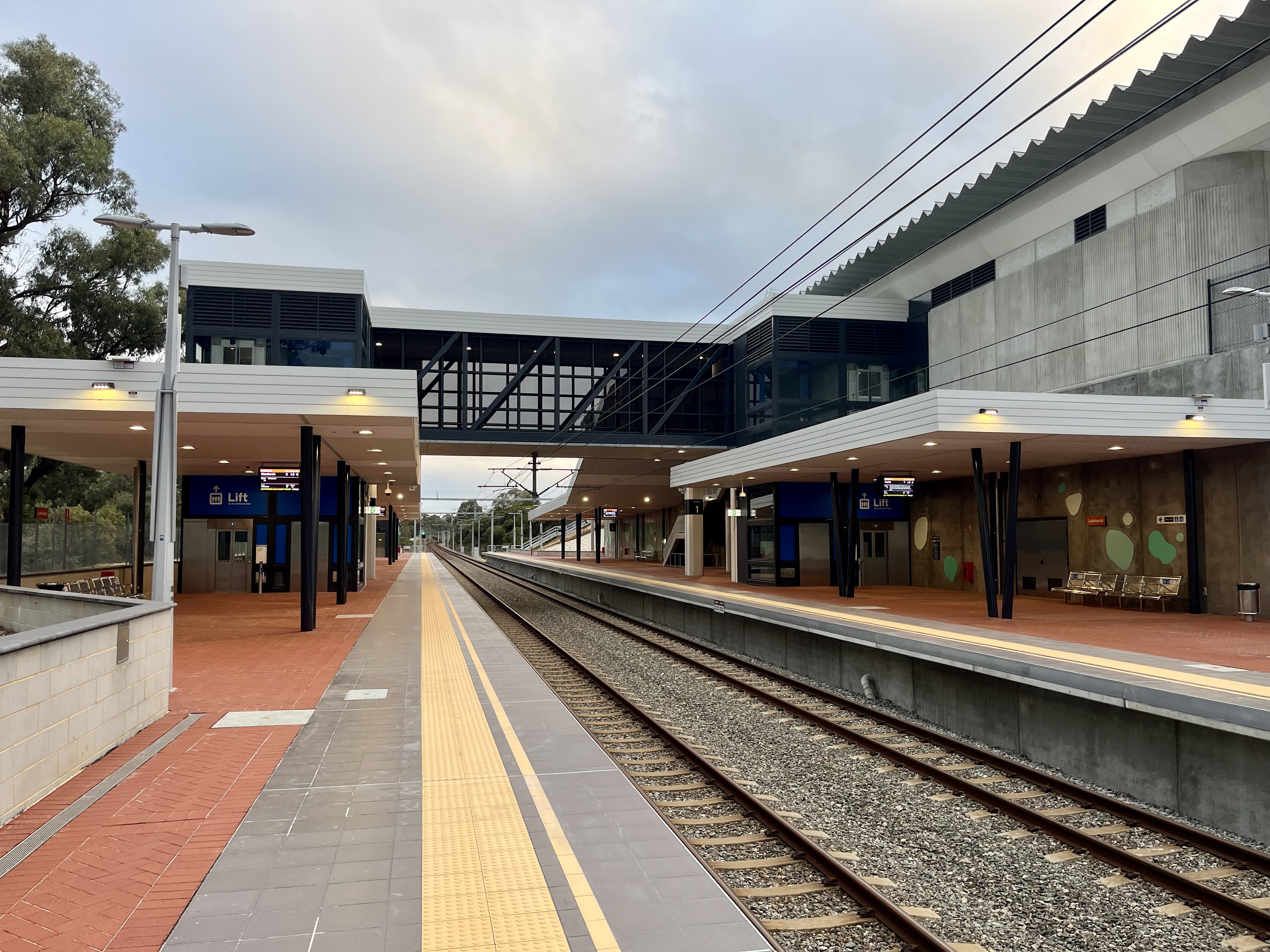
Lakelands station, one of the newest Transperth stations

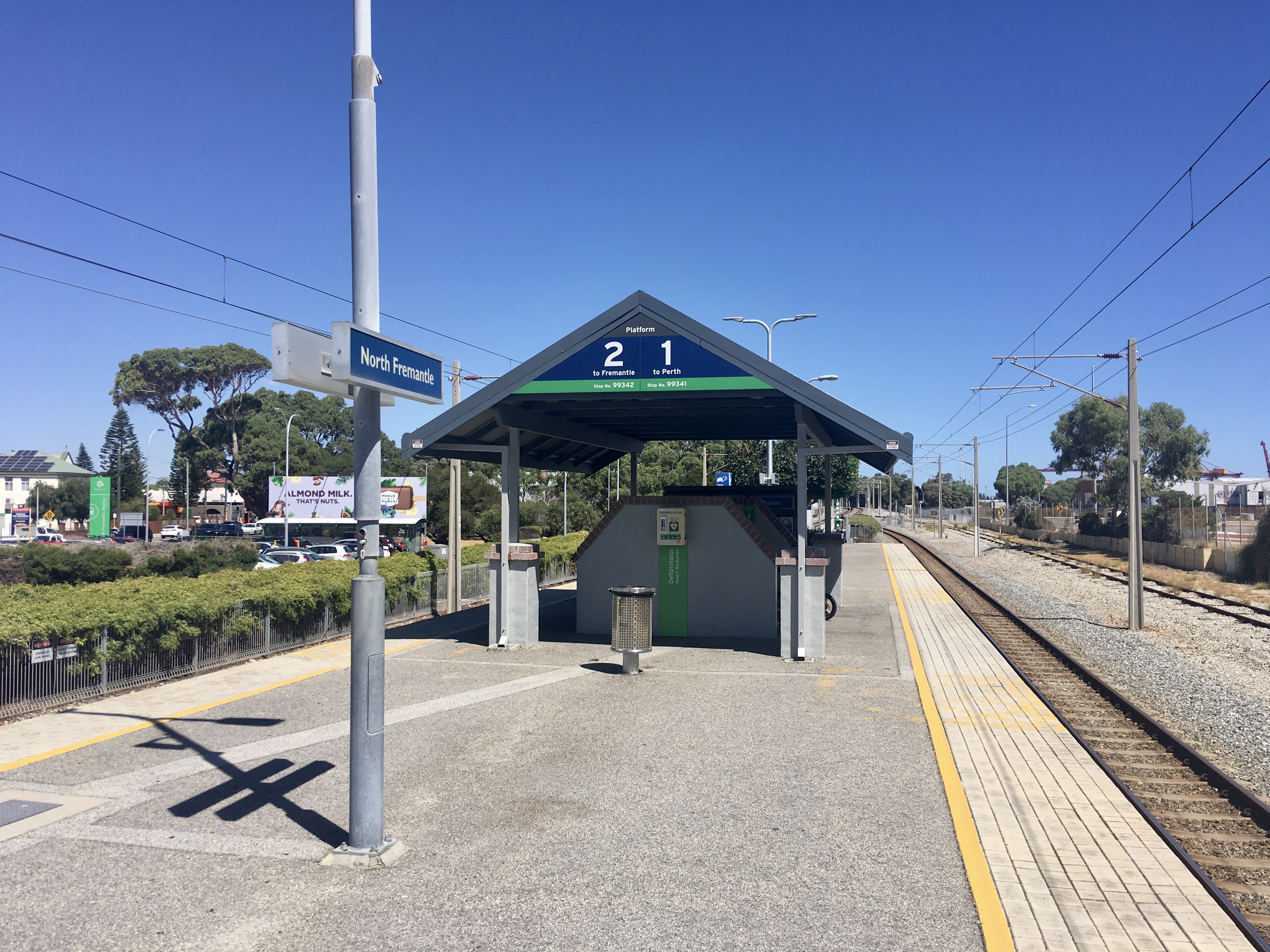
North Fremantle station, a typical heritage line station

There are 86 railway stations on the Transperth network. 52 of those stations have bus transfers. (Note: 51 excluding the event only bus station at Perth Stadium station.) Five of those stations are underground: Airport Central, Elizabeth Quay, Perth Underground, Redcliffe, and Subiaco stations. Showgrounds station only operates during events at the Claremont Showground.

Universal accessibility is best on the newer lines, with the heritage lines all having over half their stations being disability non-compliant. All stations along the Airport line branch, the Ellenbrook line branch, the Mandurah line, and the Thornlie-Cockburn line branch are accessible and in addition all stations along the Yanchep line except Edgewater, Leederville, and Stirling stations are accessible. Perth station is accessible with the exception of platform four, which is used by the Armadale line. 10 of the stations across the Armadale line are currently accessible. The stations which remain inaccessible include Perth, McIver, Burswood, Kenwick, Maddington, Gosnells, Seaforth, Kelmscott, Challis, and Sherwood. 13 stations along the Fremantle line are not accessible. The exceptions are Fremantle, Subiaco, and West Leederville stations. Eight stations along the Midland line are not accessible. The exceptions are Bassendean, Bayswater, Claisebrook, East Perth, Maylands, and Midland stations. All stations have step-free access. Factors limiting accessibility include non-compliant ramps, a lack of tactile paving, large platform gaps, and pedestrian level crossings.

All stations along the Airport line branch, the Yanchep line, the Ellenbrook line branch, the Mandurah line, and the Thornlie-Cockburn Branch have 150-metre (490 ft) long platforms, which are long enough for six car trains, the longest trains used on the network. Most stations along the heritage lines have platforms which are only 100 metres (330 ft) long, limiting the length of trains that can be used on those lines. The exceptions are Armadale, Bayswater, Beckenham, Byford, Cannington, Carlisle, East Perth, Kelmscott, Midland, Oats Street, Perth, Perth Stadium, Queens Park, West Leederville. The other stations are planned to be lengthened eventually.

=== Future ===
The Government of Western Australia has stated it is committed to building an infill station at Karnup on the Mandurah line.

== Depots ==
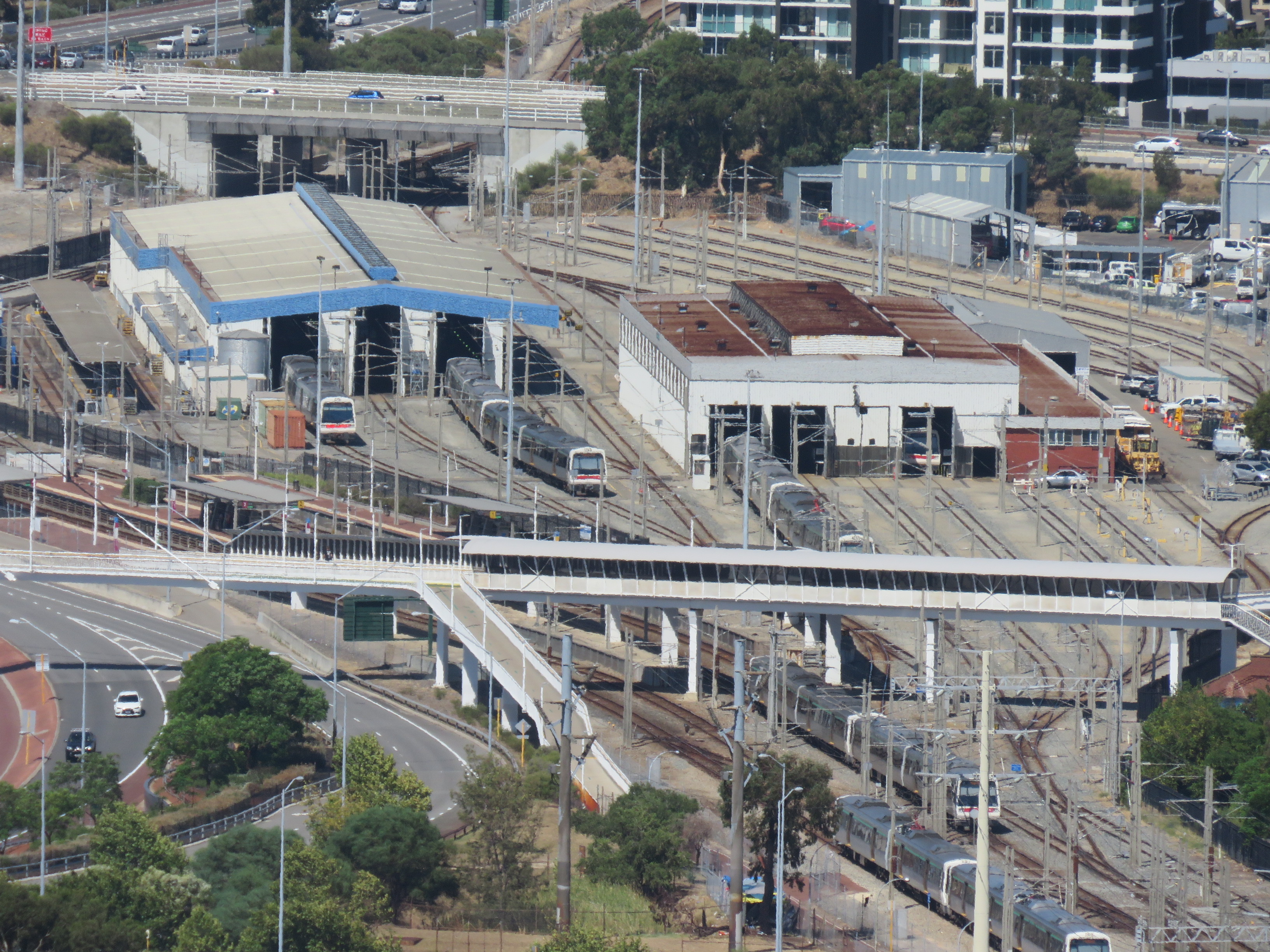
Claisebrook railcar depot

The Public Transport Authority has three depots plus one under construction:

- Claisebrook railcar depot is located in East Perth next to Claisebrook station. It primarily serves the Airport, Armadale, Fremantle, Midland, and Thornlie–Cockburn lines.
- Nowergup railcar depot is located in Nowergup between Clarkson and Butler stations on the Yanchep line. It primarily serves the Yanchep and Mandurah lines and can stow, clean and maintain trains. It was constructed in the early 2000s as part of the extension of the Joondalup line to Clarkson and was opened in June 2004.
- Mandurah railcar depot is located next to Mandurah station at the end of the Mandurah line. It is a smaller depot and serves to stow and clean trains. It was constructed when the Mandurah line was built.
- Bellevue railcar depot is under construction in Bellevue past the end of the Midland line.

== Rolling stock ==
Current rolling stock
Name	Image	Top speed	Total number of trains	Railcars per train	Manufacturer	Entered service	Lines
A-series	Transperth A-series train	110 km/h (68 mph)	48	2	ABB/Adtranz and Walkers; Maryborough, Queensland	1991–1999	Armadale; Fremantle; Midland; Ellenbrook; Thornlie–Cockburn
B-series	Transperth B-series train	130 km/h (81 mph)	78	3	Downer Rail and Bombardier; Maryborough, Queensland	2004–2019	Airport; Armadale; Fremantle; Yanchep; Mandurah; Midland; Ellenbrook; Thornlie–Cockburn
C-series	Transperth C-series train	130 km/h (81 mph)	8	6	Alstom; Bellevue, Western Australia	2024–2029	Yanchep; Mandurah; Thornlie-Cockburn*

*Stadium Event Days Only

Former rolling stock
Name	Image	Top speed	Total number of railcars	Manufacturer	Entered service	Left service
WAGR ASA class			1	Sentinel–Cammell	1931	1954
WAGR ADG class		75 km/h (47 mph)	18	Cravens; Sheffield, England	1954	1992
WAGR ADX class		75 km/h (47 mph)	10	Midland Railway Workshops; Midland, Western Australia	1959	1988
WAGR ADK class WAGR ADB class		75 km/h (47 mph)	10 ADK; 10 ABD	Commonwealth Engineering; Granville, New South Wales (ADK); Midland Railway Workshops; Midland, Western Australia (ADB)	1968	1992
WAGR ADL class WAGR ADC class		75 km/h (47 mph)	10 ADL; 10 ADC	A. Goninan & Co; Newcastle, New South Wales	1981	1992

== Patronage ==
Perth train patronage

FY	Patronage	±% p.a.
1900	5,000,000	—
1910	11,200,000	+8.40%
1920	15,600,000	+3.37%
1930	12,300,000	−2.35%
1940	9,600,000	−2.45%
1945	15,600,000	+10.20%
1950	9,600,000	−9.25%
1960	13,200,000	+3.24%
1970	10,200,000	−2.55%
1980	7,200,000	−3.42%
1981	6,500,000	−9.72%
1982	6,100,000	−6.15%
1983	6,800,000	+11.48%
1984	8,700,000	+27.94%
1985	8,700,000	+0.00%
1986	9,800,000	+12.64%
1987	9,700,000	−1.02%
1988	9,400,000	−3.09%
1989	8,800,000	−6.38%
1990	8,400,000	−4.55%
1991	7,600,000	−9.52%
1992	9,600,000	+26.32%
1993	13,600,000	+41.67%
1994	22,900,000	+68.38%
1995	23,400,000	+2.18%
1996	25,900,000	+10.68%
1997	29,000,000	+11.97%
1998	29,200,000	+0.69%

FY	Patronage	±% p.a.
1999	28,900,000	−1.03%
2000	29,500,000	+2.08%
2001	31,200,000	+5.76%
2002	31,000,000	−0.64%
2003	31,400,000	+1.29%
2004	31,114,975	−0.91%
2005	32,652,117	+4.94%
2006	34,132,593	+4.53%
2007	35,757,833	+4.76%
2008	42,636,075	+19.24%
2009	54,749,770	+28.41%
2010	56,408,742	+3.03%
2011	58,867,780	+4.36%
2012	63,029,878	+7.07%
2013	65,689,337	+4.22%
2014	63,491,683	−3.35%
2015	64,224,895	+1.15%
2016	62,644,806	−2.46%
2017	60,092,097	−4.07%
2018	60,600,052	+0.85%
2019	61,539,510	+1.55%
2020	49,734,197	−19.18%
2021	42,998,449	−13.54%
2022	42,779,726	−0.51%
2023	53,223,811	+24.41%
2024	59,723,266	+12.21%
2025	61,903,744	+3.65%
2026	73,749,274	+19.14%

Source: Bureau of Infrastructure & Transport Research Economics PTA

Train patronage in Perth from July 2025 to June 2026 was 73,749,274. Perth's rail network is the third busiest in Australia, behind Sydney Trains and Metro Trains Melbourne.

The most used stations as of October 2017 are Perth and Perth Underground, with 38,159 boardings per weekday, Elizabeth Quay, with 11,860, Murdoch, with 7,969, Warwick, with 5,125, and Joondalup, with 4,791. The least used stations as of October 2017 are Seaforth, with 136 boardings per weekday, Success Hill, with 139, Challis, with 259, Karrakatta, with 260, and Woodbridge, with 266.

Transperth trains yearly ridership per line
Line	Patronage							
Line	2011–12		2016–17		2021–22		2024–25	
Mandurah	20,293,223	32.2%	20,343,828	33.9%	14,357,888	33.6%	23,075,517	37.4%
Yanchep	16,700,234	26.5%	16,658,559	27.7%	11,752,572	27.5%	16,614,973	27.0%
Armadale and Thornlie–Cockburn	9,227,813	14.6%	7,385,888	12.3%	5,629,910	13.2%	1,515,510	2.5%
Fremantle	8,679,139	13.8%	7,940,853	13.2%	5,217,162	12.2%	5,947,360	9.6%
Midland	6,626,464	10.5%	6,143,986	10.2%	4,243,760	9.9%	4,202,370	6.9%
Replacement buses	1,503,005	2.4%	1,618,983	2.7%	1,578,434	3.7%	2,966,483	4.9%
Airport	-	-	-	-	-	-	5,619,693	8.5%
Ellenbrook	-	-	-	-	-	-	1,961,838	3.2%
Total	63,029,878	100%	60,092,097	100%	42,779,726	100%	61,903,744	100%
