= Airport line, Perth =

Suburban rail service in Perth, Western Australia

Airport line
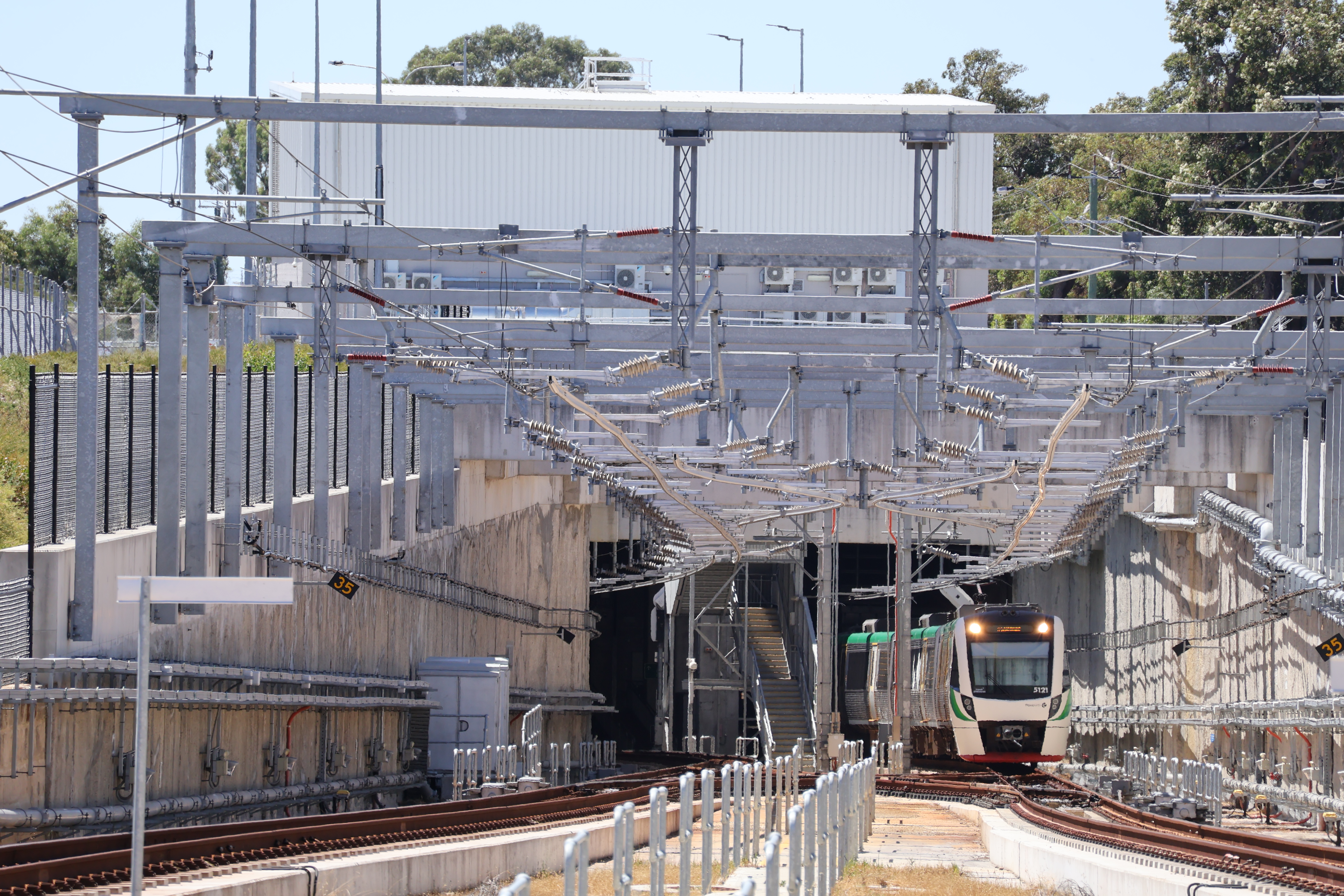
- A B-series train exiting the tunnel at High Wycombe

Overview
- Other name: Forrestfield–Airport Link (during construction)
- Owner: Public Transport Authority
- Locale: Perth, Western Australia
- Termini: High Wycombe (east); Claremont (west)
- Stations: 3 (branch); 20 (total)

Service
- Type: Suburban rail
- System: Transperth
- Operator: Public Transport Authority
- Depot: Claisebrook railcar depot
- Rolling stock: Transperth B-series trains
- Ridership: 6,229,613 (year to June 2026)

History
- Work began: 3 November 2016
- Opened: 9 October 2022

Technical
- Line length: 25.2 km (15.7 mi) (Note: This includes 8.6 kilometres (5.3 mi) from High Wycombe station to Bayswater junction, 4.9 kilometres (3.0 mi) from Bayswater junction to East Perth station, and 11.5 kilometres (7.1 mi) from East Perth station to Claremont station.)
- Num of tracks: 2
- Character: Underground and at-grade
- Track gauge: 1,067 mm (3 ft 6 in) narrow gauge
- Electrification: 25 kV 50 Hz AC from overhead catenary and overhead rail
- Operating speed: 130 km/h (81 mph)
- Signalling: Fixed block signalling
- Train protection system: Automatic train protection
Route map
- Red shading denotes the Free Transit Zone

The Airport line is a suburban railway line in Perth, Western Australia, which is operated by the Public Transport Authority as part of the Transperth system. The Airport line is a branch of the Midland line and runs underground between Bayswater and High Wycombe via Perth Airport. The branch is 8.6 kilometres (5.3 mi) long and has three stations: Redcliffe, Airport Central, and High Wycombe stations. Airport line services continue west of Bayswater along the Midland and Fremantle lines via Perth station to terminate at Claremont station.

Known during construction as the Forrestfield–Airport Link, the line was constructed by a joint venture between Salini Impregilo and NRW. Construction started in November 2016 and tunnel boring started in July 2017. The construction process was beset by several problems, including ground disturbances caused by tunnelling, a sinkhole and groundwater leak during the construction of a cross-passage, several worker injuries, and poor work conditions. Tunnel boring was completed in April 2020, which was followed by the installation of overhead line equipment, tracks, and other equipment. In addition to the main contract, works included a turnback siding at Claremont station for Airport line trains to turn around, and upgrades to Claremont and Bayswater stations. Originally planned to open in 2020, the project was delayed several times due to the aforementioned problems and later supply chain issues caused by the COVID-19 pandemic; it eventually opened on 9 October 2022. The Forrestfield–Airport Link cost A$1.86 billion in total.

Transperth B-series trains, three cars in length, operate on the Airport line every 12 minutes during peak and every 15 minutes outside peak and on weekends. All Airport line branch stations are fully accessible and have 150-metre (490 ft) long platforms; train lengths are limited by most Midland and Fremantle line stations, which have platforms only 100 metres (330 ft) long. The installation of communications-based train control by 2027 will allow frequencies to increase and planned platform lengthening will allow train lengths to increase. In the year to June 2026, the Airport line had 6,229,613 boardings.

== History ==
=== Proposals ===
The orange northern route is the light rail route proposed in the 2004 Perth Airport master plan. The blue southern route is the route proposed by the Labor Party in 2013.

The 2004 Perth Airport master plan proposed a light rail spur off the Midland line between Bayswater and Ashfield stations, travelling above ground parallel to Tonkin Highway and along Brearley Avenue to the domestic terminal (terminals 3 and 4) and underground to the international terminal (terminals 1 and 2). The Midland line between Bayswater and Perth would have been a shared light rail and heavy rail corridor, and there would have been new stations at Great Eastern Highway, the domestic terminal, and the international terminal. The state government started planning for this, having applied to Infrastructure Australia for federal funding.

Following the 2008 state election, the new Liberal government withdrew the application to Infrastructure Australia, with Premier Colin Barnett saying that he believed airport rail links were not viable in cities the size and density of Perth. The Public Transport Authority (PTA) nonetheless continued planning for the rail extension to the airport. Planning focused on building the line above ground between the Midland line at Bayswater and the Airport alongside Tonkin Highway, before tunnelling under the airport and emerging on the eastern side at High Wycombe.

In September 2012, the government announced the half tunnelled, half above ground heavy rail line as its preferred route and said it was looking at costing and when the Airport line would be built. In December 2012, the Labor opposition announced its Metronet plan to rapidly expand Perth's rail network, which it would take to the 2013 state election in March. This plan had the Airport line as part of a loop line which would connect to the Armadale line, Mandurah line and Fremantle line to the south and the Midland line to the north. The opposition revealed further details of its proposed route, making it follow a 10.5-kilometre (6.5 mi) fully above-ground route, requiring going around the airport's runways. This would have made the Airport station far away from the international terminal, requiring a 1 kilometre (1 mi) shuttle bus between the station and terminal. The Labor Party costed the route at A$731.5 million, but Treasury costed the route at $1.446 billion.

In February 2013, the government committed to its own plans of building the Airport line by 2018 at a cost of $1.895 billion. The 2013 election resulted in the government's re-election, so the half tunnelled route entered further planning. By the end of 2013, Transport Minister Troy Buswell said he was considering making the Airport line entirely underground from Bayswater to High Wycombe as it could be better value for money. Transport expert Peter Newman and Opposition Leader Mark McGowan criticised the idea of building the line entirely underground, saying it would be far more expensive.

=== Forrestfield–Airport Link ===
In August 2014, it was announced that the project, now known as the Forrestfield–Airport Link, would be fully tunnelled instead of only tunnelled within the vicinity of the airport. According to the government's modelling, there was little difference in the cost between tunnelling the whole route versus a partially tunnelled route; the government was in favour of the wholly tunnelled route because it would be less disruptive. State Cabinet approved the project in the same month and the project definition plan was published. The Forrestfield–Airport Link involved building twin-bored 8.5-kilometre (5.3 mi) tunnels from the Midland line at Bayswater to High Wycombe, passing under the Swan River and Perth Airport. There were three stations along the route: Airport West near terminals 3 and 4, Consolidated Airport near terminals 1 and 2, and Forrestfield. Airport West and Forrestfield stations were planned to have bus interchanges. Airport West and Consolidated Airport stations were planned to be underground. It was forecast the link would have 20,000 boardings per day upon opening, increasing to 29,000 by 2031. The Airport line service was planned to interline with the Midland line west of Bayswater, passing through Perth station before interlining with the Fremantle line to Daglish station, where Airport line trains would terminate and turn around. It was estimated to cost $2.2 billion, approximately $300 million more than promised in 2013, and open in 2020, two years later than promised.

For the section between Bayswater and the Airport, three options were considered: elevated rail, cut-and-cover tunnels, and deep level bored tunnels. Bored tunnels were chosen as they reduced disruption at ground level during construction and result in less land being taken up by rail infrastructure. The tunnels were chosen to have a diameter of 6.2 metres (20 ft) and have an average depth of 15 metres (49 ft) below ground level. The maximum depth is 26 metres (85 ft) where the tunnels cross under the Swan River. The Forrestfield–Airport Link is the second time that tunnel boring machines (TBMs) were used in Western Australia, the first being the construction of the William Street tunnel under the Perth central business district in the mid-2000s for the Mandurah line. The Forrestfield–Airport Link was planned to begin construction in 2016 and open in 2020.

In late 2014, the project was referred to the state's Environmental Protection Authority (EPA) and the federal Department of Agriculture, Water and the Environment for environmental approval. Because part of the project is on Perth Airport land, federal environmental approval was sought. The EPA approved the project in July 2015, and the Department of Agriculture, Water and the Environment determined that the project did not require assessment and approval from the federal government. State Parliament passed legislation in October 2015 authorising the Forrestfield–Airport Link's construction.

==== Procurement ====
Expressions of interest to build the Forrestfield–Airport Link opened in January 2015 and closed two months later; five consortia submitted expressions of interest. In April 2015, three consortia were shortlisted: JHL Joint Venture (Leighton Contractors and John Holland), SI-NRW Joint Venture (Salini Impregilo and NRW), and Forrestfield Connect (Acciona, BAM and Ferrovial Agroman). SI-NRW Joint Venture was selected in February 2016, and in April 2016, the contract was signed for $1.176 billion. Salini Impregilo held an 80 percent stake and NRW a 20 percent stake. The contract covered construction and maintenance for ten years. Upon the signing of the contract, it was announced that Airport West station had been renamed Belmont station, and Consolidated Airport station had been renamed Airport Central station. Weston Williamson and GHD Woodhead were appointed by SI-NRW as the designers of the three stations. Other contracts included a $31 million one with Georgiou Group to build an elevated walkway between Airport Central station and the airport terminal, awarded in late 2018, and a contract extension with Downer EDI–Bombardier Transportation for the construction and maintenance of ten Transperth B-series trains. The total approved budget was $1.861 billion, of which, $490 million was funded by the federal government.

Infrastructure Australia released their assessment of the Forrestfield–Airport Link in September 2016, rating it as a priority project and giving it a benefit–cost ratio of 1.4. The projected economic benefits of the project were $2.372 billion.

==== Construction ====
Site establishment at Forrestfield station began in September 2016, with the aim of getting the TBMs launched as soon as possible. On 3 November 2016, a sod turning ceremony took place at Forrestfield station with Premier Colin Barnett, State Transport Minister Bill Marmion, Federal Minister for Urban Infrastructure Paul Fletcher and Federal Minister for Infrastructure and Transport Darren Chester, which marked the start of construction for the Forrestfield–Airport Link. Following the Labor Party's victory in the 2017 state election, the Forrestfield–Airport Link was incorporated into the Metronet program.

Construction at Airport Central station began in May 2017.

The site where the Airport line branches off the Midland line is known as Bayswater junction. To construct the dive structure, the Midland line was temporarily slewed to the north. A 600-metre-long (2,000 ft), 7-metre-high (23 ft) retaining wall was built to make room for the relocated tracks, then the 750-metre-long (2,460 ft) dive structure was built using diaphragm walls.

==== Tunnelling ====
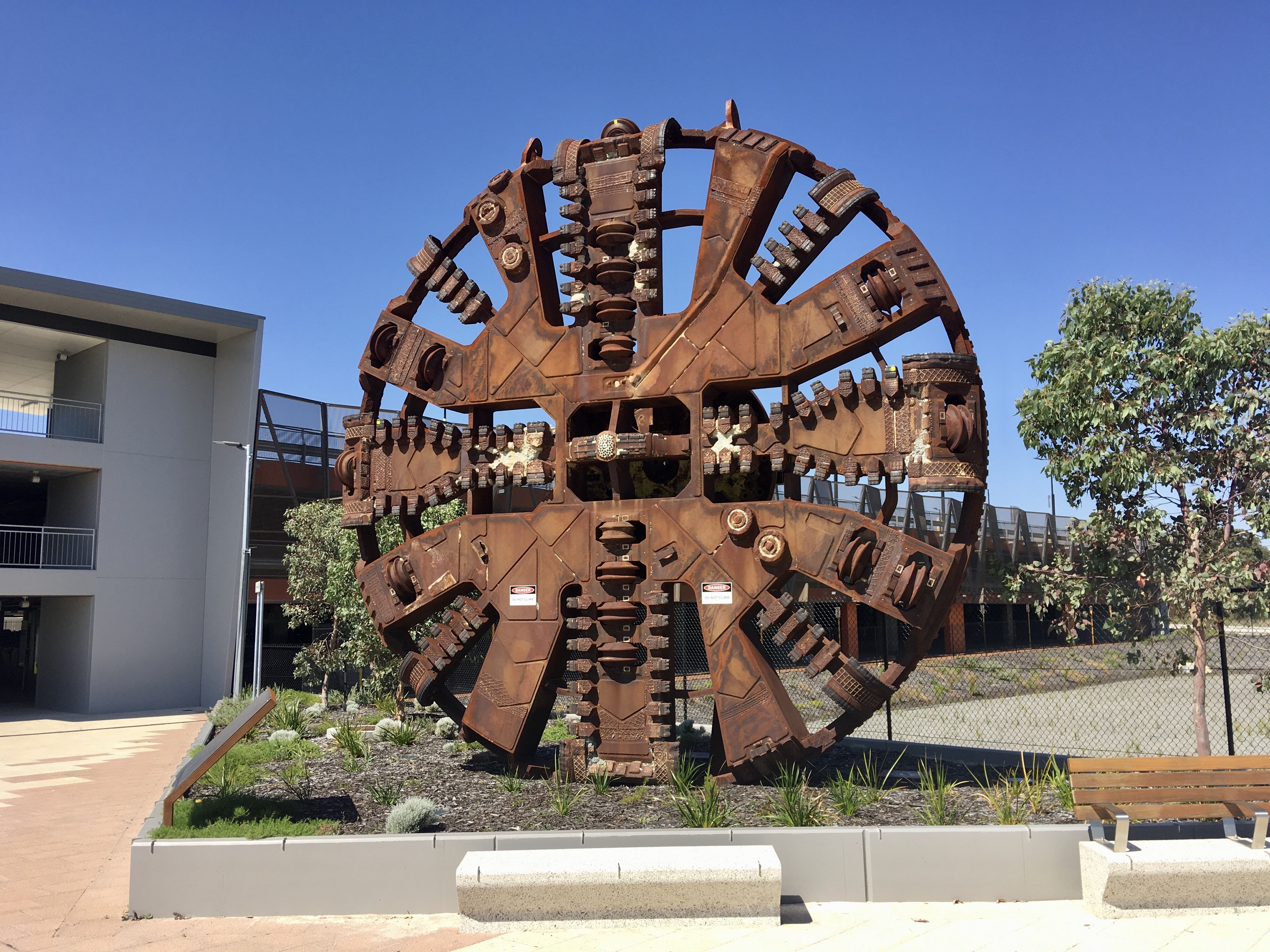
Tunnel boring machine cutterhead on display at High Wycombe station

The components for the first of two tunnel boring machines (TBMs) arrived in Perth in May, having been assembled in China by Herrenknecht. The machines each cost $20 million, weighed 600 tonnes (660 tons), and had a cutterhead diameter of 7.1 metres (23 ft). Due to varying ground conditions, variable density TBMs, a new technology at the time, were chosen. The first half of the route, from Forrestfield to Redcliffe, used the TBMs in slurry mode. The second half of the route, from Redcliffe to Bayswater, used the TBMs in earth pressure balance mode. Salini Impregilo wanted to use an earth pressure balance TBM, but the Public Transport Authority required the use of a variable density TBM due to the risks of tunnelling under the airport runways without a slurry TBM and the variable geology of the alignment. A competition was launched in April 2017 for schoolchildren to determine the names of the two tunnel boring machines (TBMs). The winning TBM names were announced in June: Grace, after a primary school student with leukaemia, and Sandy, after the sandgroper, a type of insect and a colloquial demonym for Western Australians. Artwork on each TBM by local primary school students was unveiled as well.

The TBMs were assembled at the Forrestfield construction site, then disassembled, moved into the dive structure, and reassembled there. A large logistics area at the Forrestfield construction site was set up, with a slurry treatment plant and other equipment to support tunnelling. Grace commenced tunnelling from the Forrestfield dive structure on 30 July 2017, amidst a protest by the Construction, Forestry, Mining and Energy Union (CFMEU) over the use of foreign workers on the project. Sandy commenced tunnelling from the Forrestfield dive structure on 24 October, by which point, Grace had tunnelled 620 metres (2,030 ft). Grace stopped tunnelling on 14 February 2018 due to ground disturbances 300 metres (980 ft) from Airport Central station; Sandy stopped on 28 March to maintain a safe distance to Grace. The West Australian later reported that tunnelling only stopped after Perth Airport expressed concerns, and that the airport had commissioned international tunnelling experts to assess the situation. The TBMs resumed operation on 17 April and 24 April respectively. Grace broke through into the Airport Central station box on 8 May 2018, followed by Sandy on 19 May. A 12.5-metre-long (41 ft) concrete block was used in each breakthrough to reduce water ingress and stabilise the station walls. After undergoing maintenance, Grace left the station on 18 June and Sandy on 16 July, tunnelling towards Redcliffe.

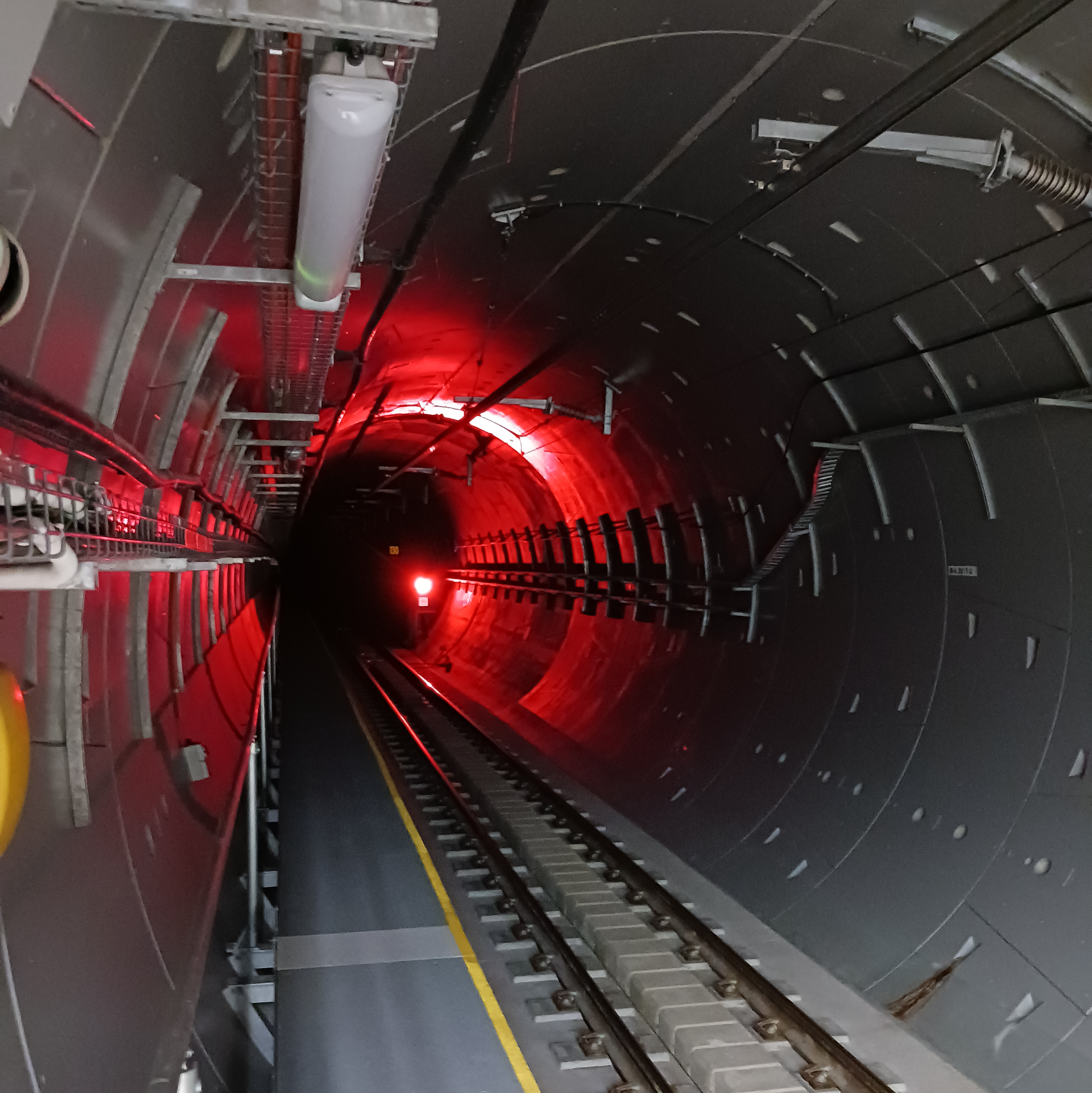
Tunnel at Airport Central station

To construct the twelve cross passages, jet grouting and ground freezing were used to stabilise the soil and prevent groundwater inflow. Jet grouting was used for the majority of the cross passages and ground freezing was used for the three cross passages within the airport's airside, where surface access was not possible. For the three cross passages located in the Osborne formation—a formation of soft rock—no ground treatment was needed. In September 2018, a leak developed during the construction of the first cross passage, which caused a sinkhole underneath Dundas Road, about 200 metres (660 ft) north of the Forrestfield construction site. Groundwater and silt flowed into one of the tunnels, causing flooding in the tunnel. Each TBM stopped work until the cross passage was repaired, and Dundas Road was closed to traffic. The final report on the incident said that the pressure of the groundwater damaged a 26-metre (85 ft) section of tunnel by causing "permanent localised distortion to the tunnel shape and movement of the segments which make up the tunnel lining". As a temporary measure, steel frames were put up to support the tunnel while a permanent fix was designed. The chosen permanent solution was for spheroidal graphite iron rings to be placed inside the damaged tunnel area to brace it. In December 2018, Transport Minister Rita Saffioti announced that the opening of the Forrestfield–Airport Link had been delayed by one year to 2021 due to the sinkhole, the TBMs moving slower than expected, and an increased rate of safety stoppages.

In January 2019, tunnelling by Grace was paused due to a damaged screw conveyor. (Note: A screw conveyor moves excavated soil away from the TBM face.) Sandy was shut down as well and hairline cracks were soon found during an inspection of its screw conveyor. Clogging issues also disrupted tunnel boring prior to Redcliffe station, with speeds reaching as low as 25 to 40 metres (82 to 131 ft) per week. These issues were alleviated by modifications to the TBMs' flushing system. Grace reached Redcliffe station on 9 May 2019. After several weeks of maintenance, Grace left Redcliffe station on 14 June, tunnelling towards Bayswater. Sandy reached Redcliffe station on 6 July. By this point, two cross passages had been completed and five more were under construction. In October 2019, Grace reached the Swan River. At 26 metres (85 ft) below water level, this is the deepest point of the tunnel. Ground subsidence of up to 26 centimetres (10 in) occurred in floodplain bushland in the vicinity of the river. Grace reached the Bayswater dive structure on 18 February 2020 and Sandy reached the dive structure on 20 April, marking the completion of tunnel boring. The TBMs averaged a speed of 80 metres (260 ft) per week and the maximum speed reached was 165 metres (541 ft), or 103 rings, per week.

==== After tunnelling ====
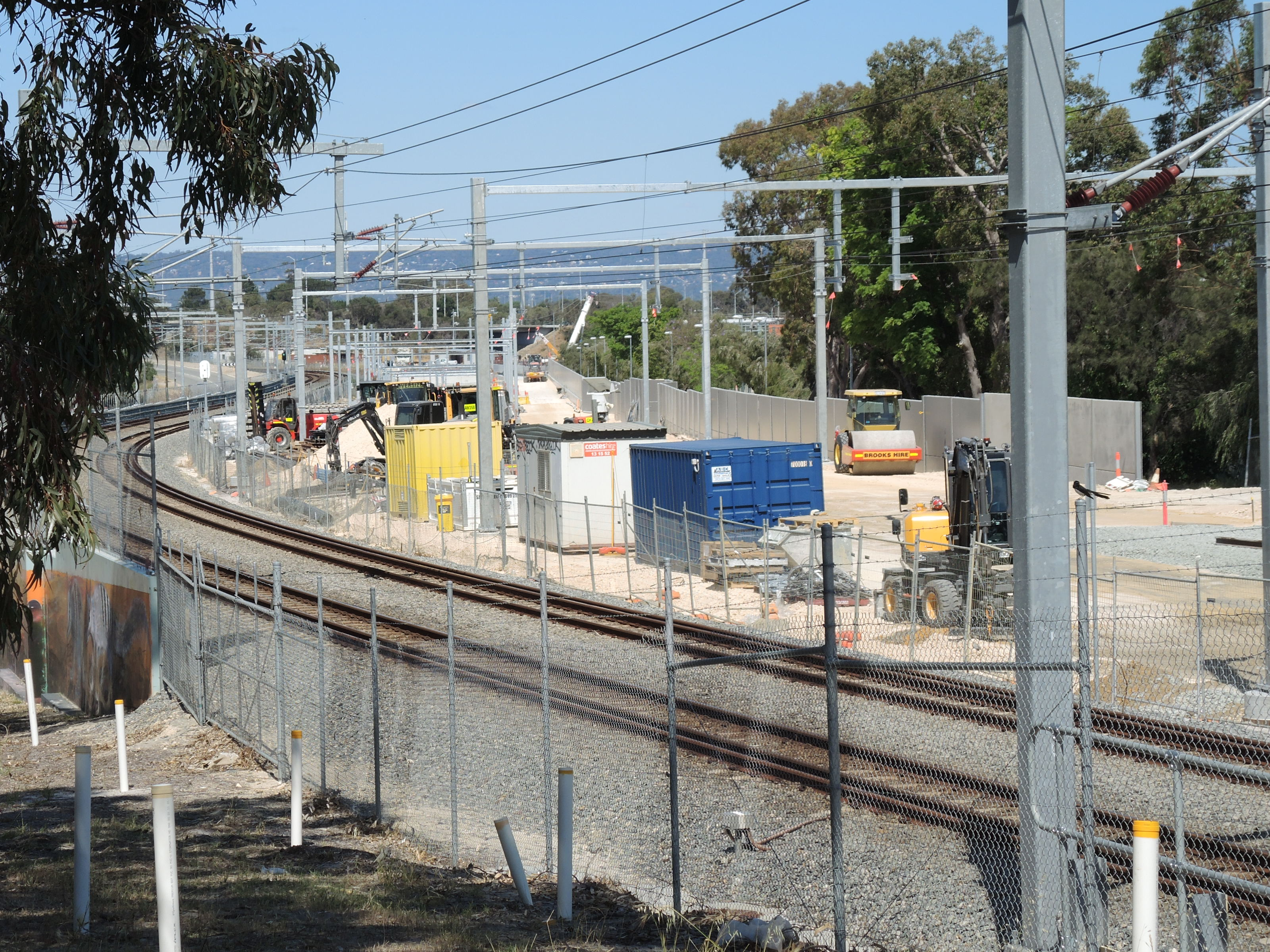
Bayswater junction in October 2020, with the Midland line slewed to the left

Track laying and the installation of overhead line equipment, signalling, and communications equipment commenced in July 2020. Within the tunnels, instead of the traditional overhead wires, a rigid overhead conductor rail was used, which had only previously been done in Perth for the Perth City Link tunnel. Track laying was completed in July 2021.

In February and March 2021, two 56-hour shutdowns of the Midland line took place to connect the Forrestfield–Airport Link to the rest of the rail network. Saffioti announced in May 2021 that the line's opening date had been delayed to the first half of 2022, blaming delays in the supply of steel and other materials due to the COVID-19 pandemic.

==== Safety issues ====
In October 2017, a worker at Bayswater junction suffered an electric shock when a crane hit high-voltage power lines. Salini Australia was fined $150,000 for the incident and ordered to pay $3,000 in costs. The crew involved did not usually work at the site they were at, and had not gone through an induction for the site. In July 2018, a worker was knocked unconscious after being struck in the head by a high pressure air hose at Airport Central station. The hose had disconnected from a pipe running along the tunnel wall. Salini Australia was fined $200,000 for the incident and ordered to pay $2,847.50 in costs. In November 2018, a carpenter was injured at Airport Central station. The CFMEU called for all work on the project to stop so that an independent safety audit could be done. The union claimed that grouting to waterproof the tunnel was not up to the specifications, which could cause the tunnel to collapse. The union also said that workers on 457 visas were made to work in unsafe conditions.

A worker's arm was crushed by one of the TBM's hydraulic thrust arms in December 2018. In May 2019, 500 metres (1,600 ft) of slurry pipes fell down in the tunnel as the brackets holding the pipes failed. The pipes carried slurry to and from the TBMs to control the pressure at the face of the machines. The incident caused Sandy to stop work for about one week. A former TBM supervisor who quit due to safety concerns had predicted the pipes would collapse, writing to Transport Minister Rita Saffioti and Industrial Relations Minister Bill Johnston in October 2018 that the pipe brackets were "dangerously deficient". The CFMEU had also expressed concerns about the brackets, saying they did not meet Australian standards. Workers said that if anyone had been near the pipes at the time they collapsed, they would have been killed. In July 2019, a worker suffered severe chemical burns after standing in contaminated water for seven hours. The water managed to enter his knee high gumboots, causing chemical burns on his legs and feet. The worker was left unable to drive or work more than a year later.

In September 2022, the United Professional Firefighters Union expressed concern that the Airport line's opening was being rushed. The union wanted for more firefighters to be familiarised with the tunnels before the line opened.

==== Other issues ====
In 2017, it was publicised that groundwater and soil underneath Perth Airport was contaminated with per- and polyfluoroalkyl substances (PFAS), which are toxic chemicals formerly used in firefighting foam. About 900,000 cubic metres (32,000,000 cu ft) of soil dug up during tunnelling was contaminated. This soil was temporarily piled up at an industrial lot in Forrestfield before a permanent solution was decided. It was estimated that the temporary storage would cost $50 million and permanent disposal would cost $270 million. The state wanted to reuse the contaminated soil on the future third runway project at Perth Airport, but the federal government rejected that proposal. As of March 2023, some of the contaminated soil has been used on the Great Eastern Highway Bypass upgrade, with the rest to be used on future infrastructure projects.

In July 2021, SI-NRW JV commenced legal action against GHD Group, alleging it was negligent in failing to prepare an adequate design concept. In particular, SI-NRW JV alleged that GHD breached the tender design agreement for the twelve cross passages and three stations, causing the joint venture to suffer a $17.5 million loss. GHD refuted by saying that the contract was only for the supply of basic design sketches for costings.

=== Other ===
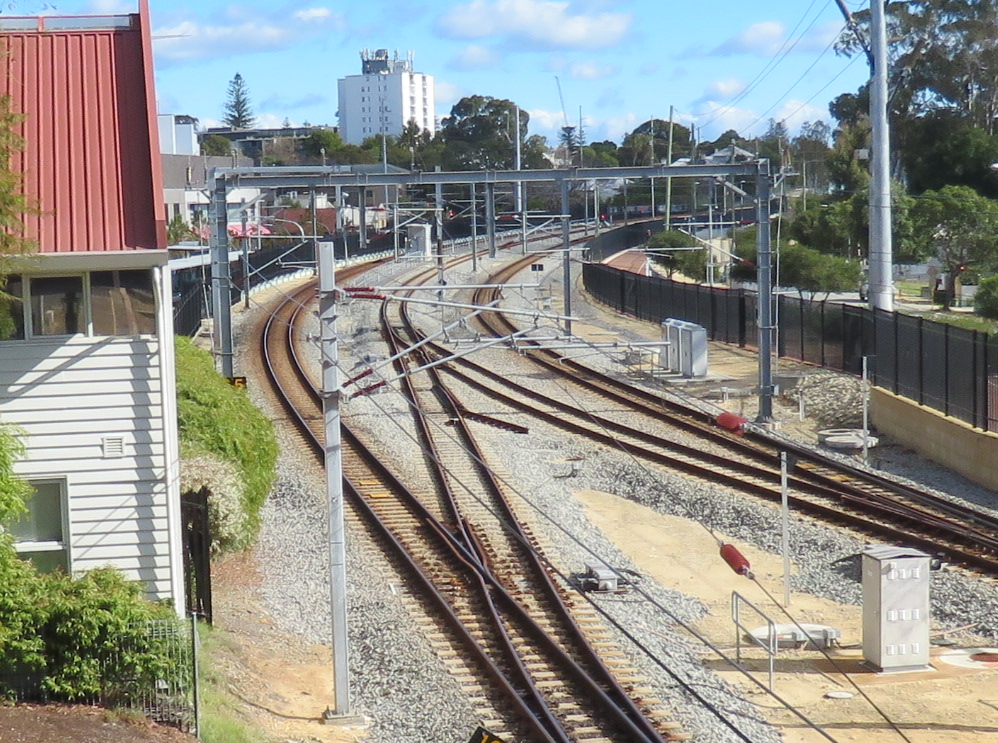
Turnback siding at Claremont station

Upgrades of Claremont and Bayswater stations were undertaken as part of the Forrestfield–Airport Link, and the two level crossings along the route were closed. The Moore Street level crossing was closed in October 2019 and the Caledonian Avenue level crossing was closed April 2022.

The Airport line was originally planned to terminate at Daglish station, as there was already a turnback siding there. In 2018, it was announced that the terminus had been moved to Claremont station, five stations west of Daglish. This required an upgrade of Claremont station to modern accessibility standards and the construction of two turnback sidings west of the station. Claremont station was chosen as it is located halfway along the Fremantle line and is the line's third busiest station, after Fremantle and Subiaco. In August 2020, John Holland was awarded a $36 million contract to undertake the construction works at Claremont station. From 5 February to 5 April 2021, Claremont station was closed and the Fremantle line was partially shut down to complete the upgrade of Claremont station and build the two turnback sidings. The Fremantle line reopened to full service on 6 April, but Claremont station remained closed as workers discovered problems with the station's original construction. Claremont station reopened on 1 June 2021.

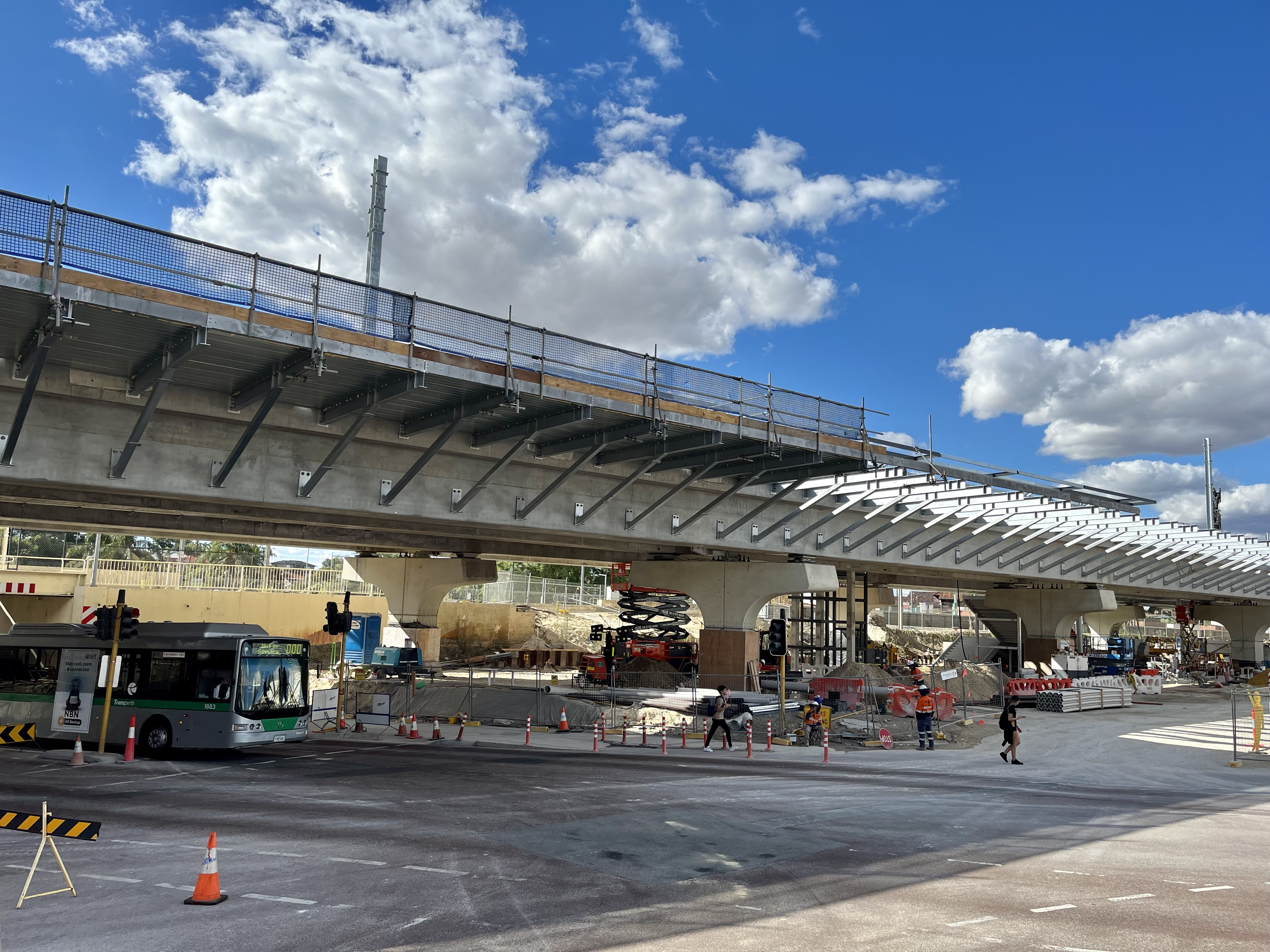
Bayswater station under construction in March 2023

Originally only $7 million was to be spent on minor upgrades to Bayswater station to bring it into compliance with modern accessibility standards. Local residents called for a more substantial upgrade to the station. The Labor opposition promised an upgrade of Bayswater station ahead of the 2017 state election, and after Labor won the election, planning for the station's upgrade commenced. The scope of the upgrade to Bayswater station was revealed in April 2018. The station was planned to be rebuilt as an elevated station with 150-metre (490 ft) long platforms to handle six-car trains. In August 2019, when the Morley–Ellenbrook line was confirmed to branch off the Midland line at Bayswater as well, the scope of the Bayswater station rebuild was expanded to building four platforms. In April 2020, a $253 million contract for the project was awarded to the Evolve Bayswater Alliance, consisting of Coleman Rail and Decmil. Construction began in January 2021. On 31 March 2023, the old Bayswater station permanently closed, and a 27-day shutdown of the Airport and Midland lines commenced, where the turnback siding was constructed and the previous station was demolished. The Airport and Midland lines reopened on 27 April and the new Bayswater station opened on 8 October 2023.

=== Opening ===
The first train entered the tunnel in March 2022 to test the tunnel's ventilation system, using the train to measure its resistance to airflow. In an interview in April 2022, Saffioti reiterated that she intended the line would open by the end of June 2022. Following the state budget on 12 May 2022, the government changed its position, now saying the line will open some time later in the year, although a specific opening date was not provided. A report by the Auditor General of Western Australia released in June 2022 criticised the government for its lack of transparency for major projects, including the Forrestfield–Airport Link and the project was assessed as being within its approved budget of $1.86 billion. Three emergency readiness exercises occurred in July 2022. The West Australian also reported in July that there were delays due to problems with mobile phone coverage in the tunnels and problems with exhaust fans that are meant to extract smoke in the event of a fire. Driver training, expected to take eight weeks to complete, began on 8 August 2022.

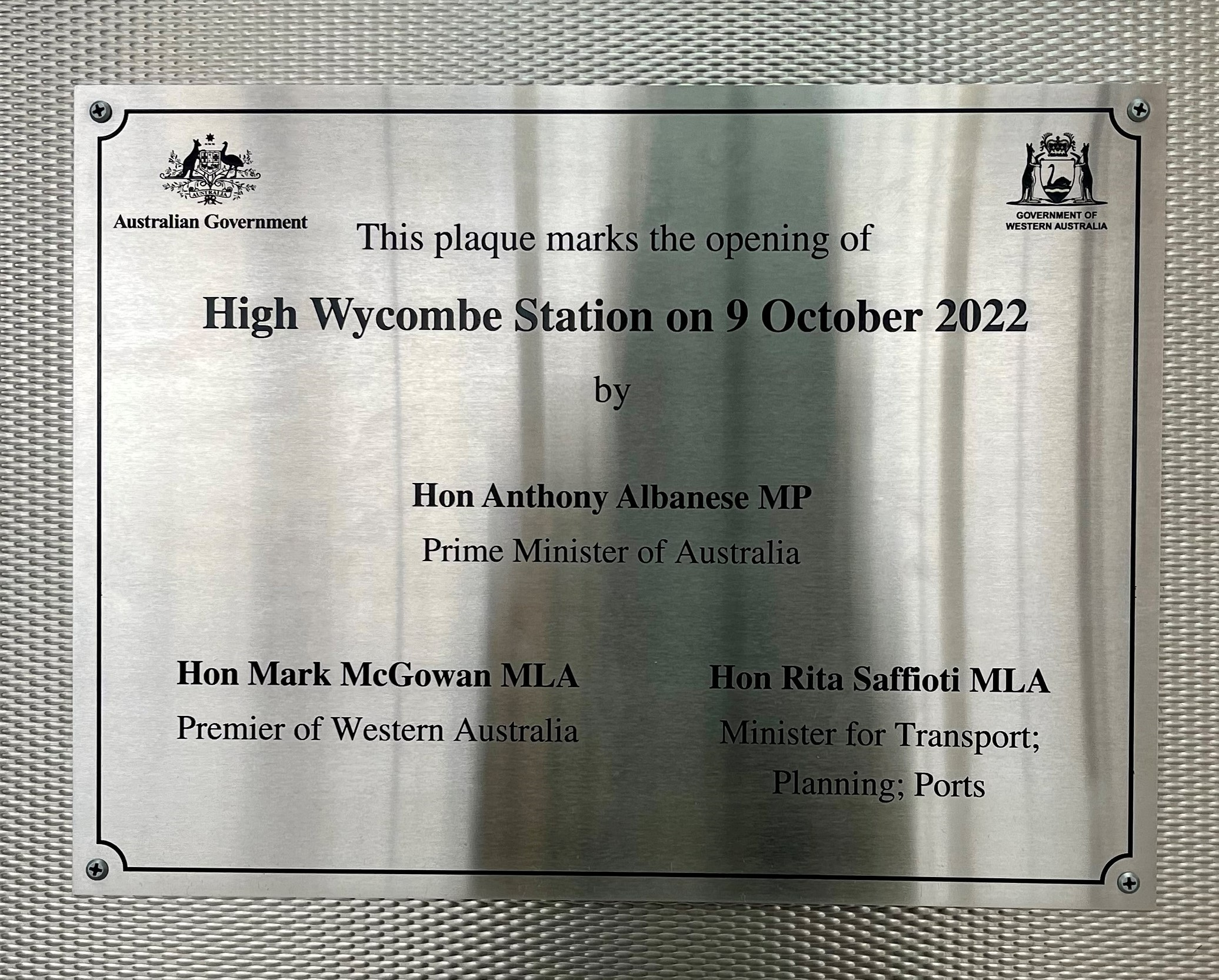
Plaque commemorating High Wycombe station's opening

In August, the opening date was revealed to be Sunday 9 October 2022. The Forrestfield–Airport Link achieved practical completion on 30 September. The line was officially opened on 9 October by Prime Minister Anthony Albanese, Premier Mark McGowan, and Transport Minister Saffioti. To celebrate, a community open day was organised for High Wycombe and Redcliffe stations on the day of the opening, which involved live entertainment and food. Revamped bus services commenced on Monday 10 October. The Forrestfield–Airport Link ended up $20 million under budget, and remains the only Metronet project not to go over budget.

== Description ==
The Airport line branch uses 1,067 mm (3 ft 6 in) narrow gauge track and has a maximum speed of 130 kilometres per hour (81 mph). Trains are powered by 25 kV 50 Hz AC overhead line equipment. In the tunnels, where space is limited, a rigid overhead conductor rail is used. The Airport line branch is powered by a substation near High Wycombe station. The Midland and Fremantle lines are powered by substations near East Perth and City West stations.

The Airport line uses fixed block signalling. As part of the High Capacity Signalling Project, Alstom and DT Infrastructure will replace the signalling system with Alstom's Urbalis communications-based train control (CBTC) system. The Airport, Ellenbrook, Fremantle and Midland lines are to be Perth's first lines with the upgraded signalling system. As of 2026, this is planned to be operational in 2029.

The Wright Crescent emergency egress shaft building

The tunnel has an internal diameter of 6.17 metres (20 ft 3 in), with 300-millimetre (12 in) thick lining segments in a 5+1 configuration. It ranges from 4 metres (13 ft) to 33 metres (108 ft) below ground level. The tunnel centerlines range from 10 to 20 metres (33 to 66 ft) apart. There are three emergency egress shafts: at Abernethy Road, Airport West, and Wright Crescent, and twelve cross passages between the tunnels, which are used for emergency evacuations and to house equipment.

=== Route ===
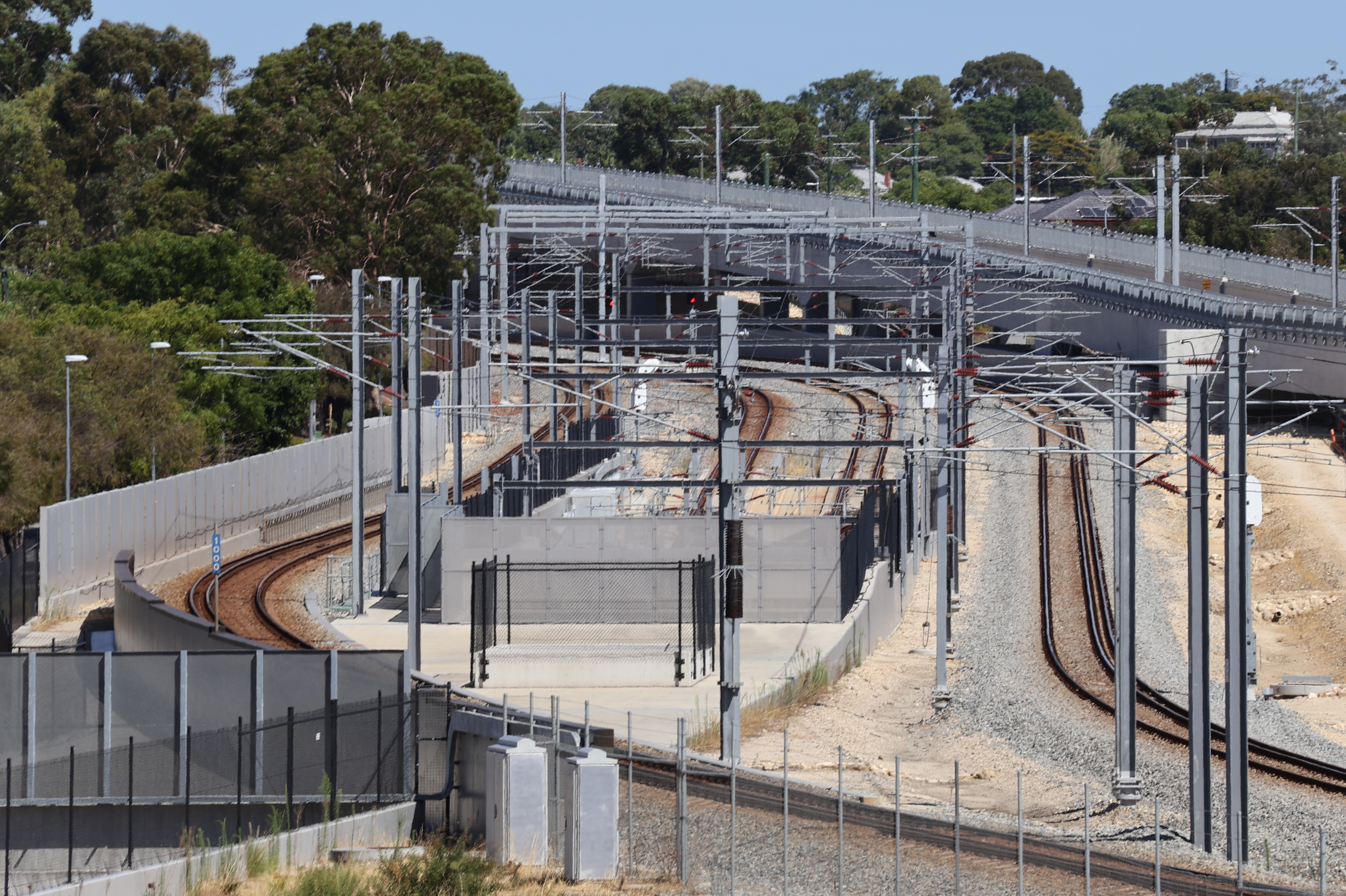
The junction between the Airport and Midland lines. The Airport line enters the tunnel here

The Airport line branch's and service's eastern terminus is at High Wycombe station, an above ground station next to the Kwinana railway line and Forrestfield Marshalling Yard. The station serves High Wycombe, Forrestfield, Maida Vale, Gooseberry Hill, and Kalamunda. From there, the line heads north, entering the tunnel soon after and curving west, passing under the freight railway and marshalling yard, entering Perth Airport land, and passing under the site of a future third runway. At the 2.4-kilometre (1.5 mi) mark, the line reaches Airport Central station, which is an underground station in the car park for Perth Airport terminals one and two. The line travels further west, bending northwest to travel under the airport's two runways. At the 5.1-kilometre (3.2 mi) mark, the line reaches Redcliffe station, located in the residential area of Redcliffe, 1 kilometre (1 mi) from Perth Airport terminals three and four. The line travels northwest from there, under the former Brearley Avenue and then Tonkin Highway. The line passes under the Swan River and then surfaces just north of Guildford Road in Bayswater. The Airport line enters between the two tracks of the Midland line and rises up to ground level to join the Midland line at the 8.6-kilometre (5.3 mi) mark.

Along the Midland line, Airport line services continue, stopping at seven stations along the way to Perth station, which is the centre of the Transperth network. Past Perth station, Airport line services travel along the Fremantle line to Claremont station, where they terminate at the turnback sidings.

=== Stations ===
The Airport line has twenty stations, including Showgrounds station, where trains only stop during events at Claremont Showground.

All stations on the Airport line branch are fully accessible and have 150-metre (490 ft) long island platforms, long enough for a six-car train. Most stations along the Midland and Fremantle line section have only 100-metre (330 ft) platforms, limiting the length of trains that can use the Airport line. The exceptions are Bayswater, East Perth, Perth, and West Leederville stations. The remaining stations are planned to be lengthened eventually. Along the Midland and Fremantle line section, there are nine stations which are not fully accessible and seven stations which are fully accessible. Factors limiting accessibility include non-compliant ramps, a lack of tactile paving, large platform gaps, and pedestrian level crossings.

Key
Icon	Purpose
§	Special events station

Station	Image	Distance from Perth		Location	Opened	Connections
Station	Image	km	mi	Location	Opened	Connections
High Wycombe	High Wycombe station platform	15.8	9.8	High Wycombe	9 October 2022	Bus
Airport Central	Airport Central station underground concourse	13.4	8.3	Perth Airport	9 October 2022	Bus, Perth Airport terminals 1 and 2
Redcliffe	Redcliffe station underground platform	10.7	6.6	Redcliffe, Perth Airport	9 October 2022	Bus, Perth Airport terminals 3 and 4
Bayswater	Elevated station passing over a street	6.7	4.2	Bayswater	28 September 1896	Bus, Ellenbrook and Midland lines
Meltham	Meltham station platform	5.5	3.4	Bayswater	14 June 1948	Ellenbrook and Midland lines
Maylands	Maylands station platform	4.5	2.8	Maylands	1 February 1900	Ellenbrook and Midland lines
Mount Lawley	Mount Lawley station platform	3.2	2.0	Mount Lawley	10 April 1907	Ellenbrook and Midland lines
East Perth	East Perth station platform	2.1	1.3	East Perth, Perth	15 June 1969	Ellenbrook and Midland lines, Transwa coaches, AvonLink, MerredinLink, Prospector, and Indian Pacific
Claisebrook	Claisebrook station platform	1.3	0.8	East Perth, Perth	1883	Armadale, Ellenbrook, Midland and Thornlie–Cockburn lines
McIver	McIver station platform	0.7	0.4	Perth	14 August 1989	Armadale, Ellenbrook, Midland and Thornlie–Cockburn lines
Perth	Perth station platforms	0.0	0.0	Perth	1 March 1881	Bus at Perth Busport; Australind, Armadale, Ellenbrook, Fremantle, Mandurah, Midland, Thornlie–Cockburn, and Yanchep lines
City West	City West station platforms	−1.6	−1.0	West Perth	1883	Fremantle line
West Leederville	West Leederville station platforms	−2.7	−1.7	Subiaco, West Leederville	1897	Fremantle line
Subiaco	Subiaco station platforms	−3.6	−2.2	Subiaco	1883	Bus, Fremantle line
Daglish	Daglish station platform	−4.9	−3.0	Daglish, Subiaco	14 July 1924	Fremantle line
Shenton Park	Shenton Park station platform	−6.0	−3.7	Shenton Park	1 September 1908	Bus, Fremantle line
Karrakatta	Karrakatta station platforms	−7.6	−4.7	Karrakatta	1896	Fremantle line
Loch Street	Loch Street station platforms	−8.0	−5.0	Claremont, Karrakatta	28 November 1954	Fremantle line
Showgrounds§	Showground station entrance	−8.7	−5.4	Claremont	2 October 1954	Fremantle line
Claremont	Claremont station platform	−9.4	−5.8	Claremont	1881	Bus, Fremantle line

== Service ==
Transperth train services are operated by the Public Transport Authority. Airport line headways are 12 minutes during peak, 15 minutes outside peak and on weekends, and half-an-hour or an hour at night. A few services in the early morning and at night only run between Perth and High Wycombe; the rest of the services run the full length of the line to Claremont. The travel time end-to-end is 38 minutes. Trains commence at 5:09 am on weekdays, 5:31 am on Saturdays, and 7:01 am on Sundays, and end at 12:25 am on weeknights and 2:12 am on weekend nights. These operating hours have been criticised for not meeting early morning FIFO flights, but the government says that the Airport line meets 80 percent to 85 percent of all flights in and out of Perth Airport, and that the line needs to be available for maintenance at night. The 12-minute peak frequency required the Midland and Fremantle lines to reduce their peak frequency from every 10 minutes upon the Airport line's opening.

=== Rolling stock ===
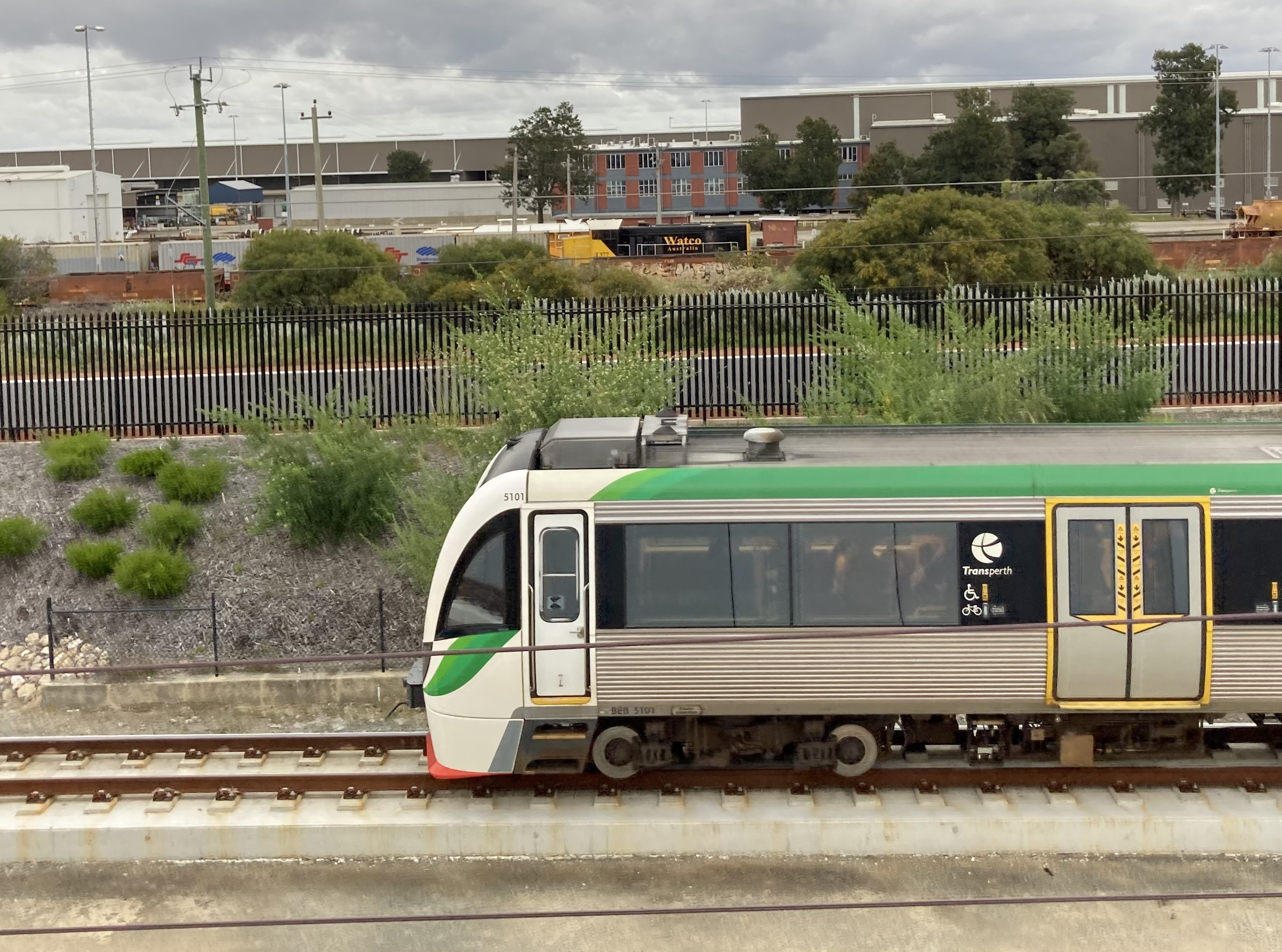
A B-series train approaching High Wycombe station

The main rolling stock used on the Airport line are Transperth B-series trains. These trains entered service between 2004 and 2019, have a maximum speed of 130 kilometres per hour (81 mph), and consist of three cars. Each car has two doors per side. In 2016, the final 10 B-series trains were ordered specifically for the Airport line.

=== Patronage ===
Six months after opening, it was reported that the Airport line had 12,000 passengers per day, below the 20,000 expected. In the latest financial year, 2025–26, the Airport line had 6,229,613 boardings. According to Perth Airport, only four percent of airport passengers arrived or departed via the Airport line. The low uptake was blamed on the Qantas terminal not being consolidated at the Airport Central precinct and the lack of services for early morning flights.

Airport line annual patronage
Year	Patronage	±%
2022–23	2,871,117	—
2023–24	4,860,015	+69.27%
2024–25	5,619,693	+15.63%
2025–26	6,229,613	+10.85%

== See also ==
- Railways in Perth
- List of airport rail link systems
