= Karrakatta railway station =

Railway station in Perth, Western Australia

Karrakatta
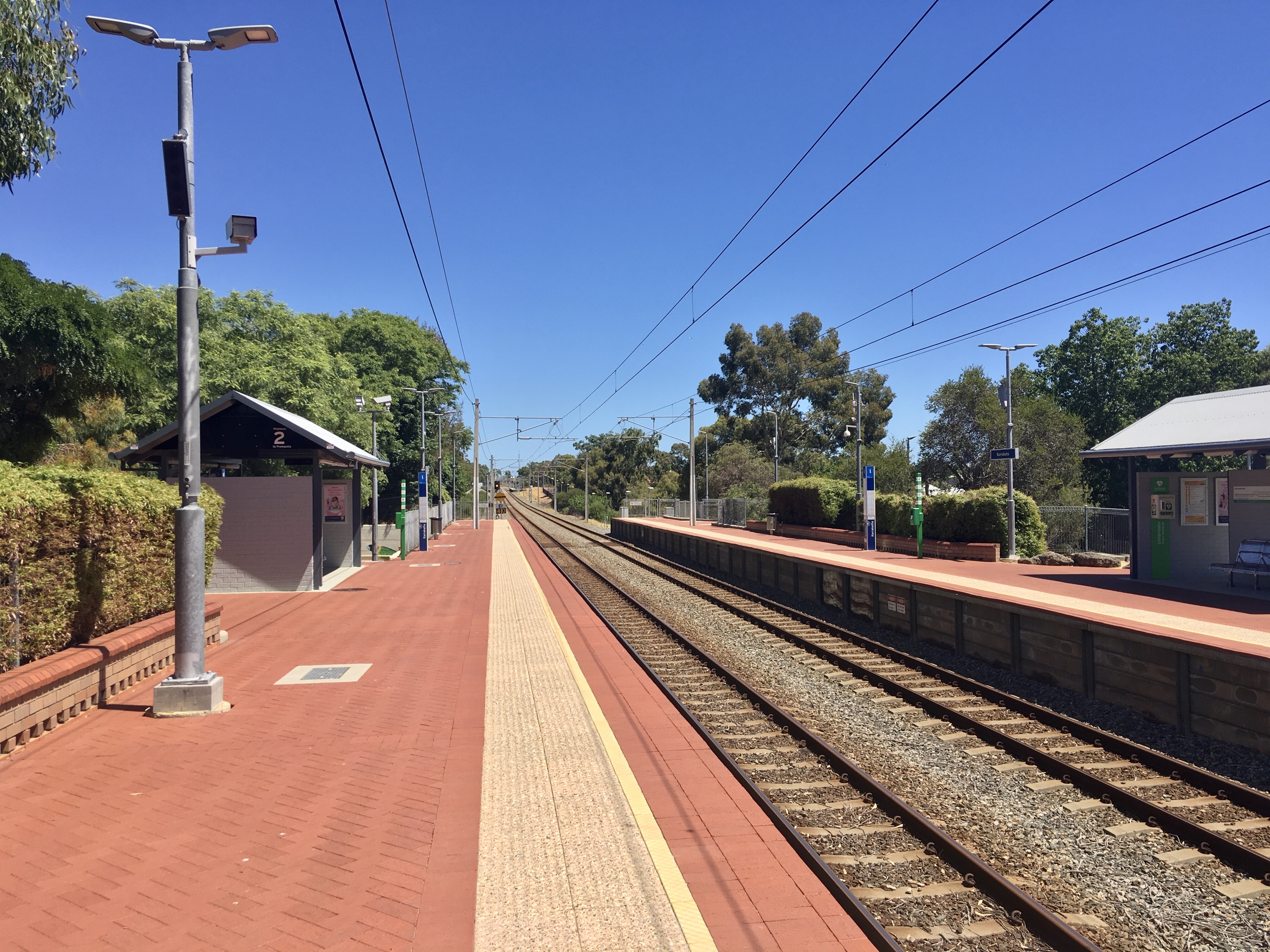
- South-west bound view from Platform 2, March 2022

General information
- Location: Railway Road, Karrakatta, Western Australia; Australia
- Coordinates: 31°58′07″S 115°47′46″E
- Owner: Public Transport Authority
- Operator: Transperth Train Operations
- Lines: Fremantle line Airport line
- Distance: 7.4 kilometres (4.6 mi) from Perth
- Platforms: 2 side
- Tracks: 2

Construction
- Structure type: Ground

Other information
- Fare zone: 1

History
- Opened: 1886

Passengers
- 2013–14: 66,562

Services
Preceding station	Transperth	Following station
Shenton Park towards Perth	Fremantle line	Loch Street towards Fremantle
Shenton Park towards High Wycombe	Airport line	Loch Street towards Claremont
Location
- Location of Karrakatta railway station

Karrakatta railway station is a railway station on the Transperth network in Western Australia. It is located on the Airport line and Fremantle line, 7.4 kilometres (4.6 mi) from Perth station, serving the suburb of Karrakatta. It is situated adjacent to Karrakatta Cemetery.

== History ==
Karrakatta station opened in 1886. The station closed on 1 September 1979 along with the rest of the Fremantle line, re-opening on 29 July 1983 when services were restored.

The station has received Airport line services since 10 October 2022.

From 2034, Karrakatta station's platforms are planned to be extended to the north-east to accommodate six-car trains.

== Services ==
Karrakatta station is served by the Airport and Fremantle lines on the Transperth network. Services are operated by Transperth Train Operations, a division of the PTA. The Fremantle line runs between Fremantle station and Perth station, continuing past Perth as the Midland line. The Airport line, which commenced regular services on 10 October 2022, goes between High Wycombe station and Claremont station.

Airport line and Fremantle line trains stop at Karrakatta every 12 minutes each during peak hour for a combined frequency of a train every 6 minutes. Outside peak hour and on weekends and public holidays, each line has a train every 15 minutes for a combined frequency of 7.5 minutes. Late at night, each line has a half-hourly or hourly frequency.

Karrakatta station saw 66,562 passengers in the 2013–14 financial year, making it the least used station on the Fremantle line.

Karrakatta platform arrangement
Stop ID	Platform	Line	Destination	Via	Stopping Pattern	Notes
99251	1	Fremantle line	Perth		All stations	
99251	1	Airport line	High Wycombe	Perth	W	
99252	2	Fremantle line	Fremantle		All stations	
99252	2	Airport line	Claremont		W	
