= Graylands Teachers College =

Former primary teacher college in Perth, Western Australia

- Motto: Non Nobis Solum
- Motto in English: Not for ourselves alone
- Active: 6 May 1955; 71 years ago –1979; 47 years ago
- Principal: Neil Traylen (1955–1958); Bill Halliday (1959–1965); Bob Peter (1966–1969); Clarrie Makin (1970–1978)
- Location: Mount Claremont, Western Australia, Australia; 31°58′03″S 115°47′08″E

Graylands Teachers College was a primary teacher education institution, established in 1955 in Mount Claremont (which was called Graylands at the time) in Western Australia. It became the second teachers' college to be established in the state after Claremont Teachers College, with three others established subsequently. Built on a former World War II army barracks site, most of the buildings were corrugated iron and asbestos structures which had only been intended to operate for about five years.

The college was run by the Education Department until 1973, when it became an autonomous body under the umbrella of the Western Australian Teacher Education Authority. Graylands closed in 1979 following the Partridge Report on post-secondary education in the State, which recommended that the other colleges combine to form the Western Australian College of Advanced Education and, as far as possible, absorb Graylands' resources, staff and students.

The archives for the college are held at Edith Cowan University. Graylands Teachers College Memorial Scholarships are awarded to "outstanding students in the field of education" at Edith Cowan University in memory of the college.

Notable former students include cricketer Kim Hughes, politician Don Randall and writer Dorothy Hewett.
