= Mount Claremont, Western Australia =

Mount Claremont
- Suburb
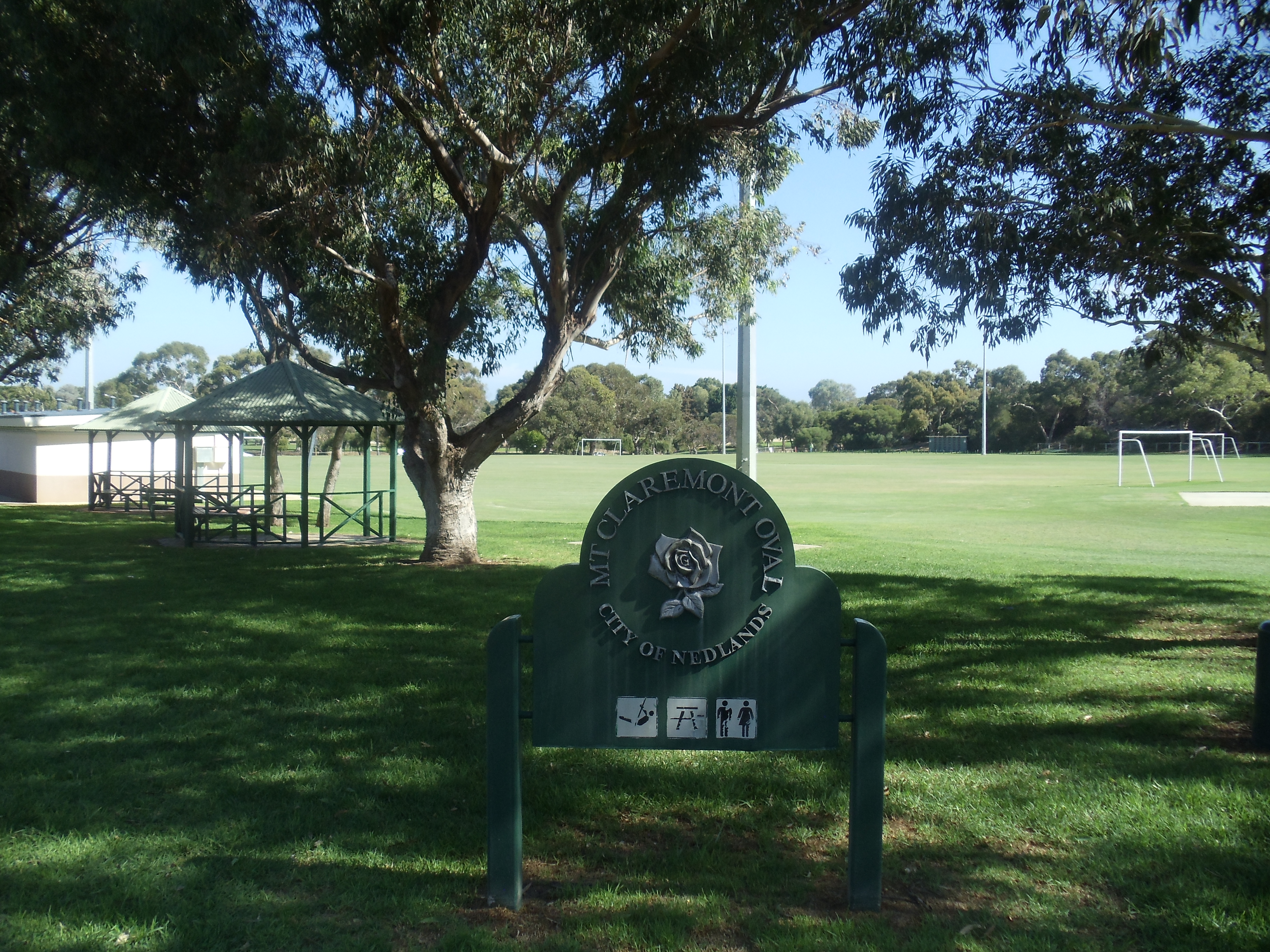
- Sign of the Mount Claremont Oval
- Interactive map of Mount Claremont
- Coordinates: 31.962°S 115.784°E
- Country: Australia
- State: Western Australia
- City: Perth
- LGAs: City of Nedlands; Town of Cambridge
- Location: 9 km (5.6 mi) W of Perth CBD

Government
  - State electorate: Cottesloe
  - Federal division: Curtin

Area
  - Total: 4.3 km^{2} (1.7 sq mi)

Population
  - Total: 4,999 (SAL 2021)
- Postcode: 6010
Suburbs around Mount Claremont
City Beach	Floreat	Floreat
Swanbourne	Mount Claremont	Shenton Park
Swanbourne	Claremont	Karrakatta

Mount Claremont, known previously as Graylands, is a suburb of Perth, Western Australia, located within the Town of Cambridge and the City of Nedlands.

Graylands underwent significant changes in the 1950s, with the post war downgrading of military and migrant facilities in the area.

== Current establishments ==
The suburb contains the Perth High Performance Centre, the Western Australian Institute of Sport (WAIS), Graylands Hospital, John XXIII College, Wollaston College, and lands owned by the University of Western Australia.

A Transperth bus depot in Brockway Road opened in July 2019 replacing a facility in Shenton Park.

== Former institutions ==
It was the site of the former Swanbourne Hospital, Graylands Teachers College (1955–1979), and Graylands Migrant Hostel (1952–1987).

== Estates ==
Residential areas in the suburb consist of four estates:

- Zamia Gardens – the newest area, still in the process of construction
- St Johns Wood – a relatively new estate, bordering John XXIII College and Graylands Hospital, with many larger blocks of land and often including views of the city
- St Peters Square – a higher density development, featuring townhouses oriented around a central park
- Old Mount Claremont – the original subdivision, consisting mostly of homes built in the 1940–1950s, including some properties bordering Cottesloe Golf Course

Demographically, Mount Claremont is reported to have a higher proportion of university or other tertiary graduates (23.4%) than the average in Perth (13.5%).

The southeast of the suburb is on the railway line between Karrakatta and Loch Street. Mount Claremont is also served by Transperth buses.
