= Showgrounds railway station, Perth =

Railway station in Perth, Western Australia

Showgrounds
- Showgrounds Station in June 2026

General information
- Location: Shenton Road, Claremont; Australia
- Coordinates: 31°58′36″S 115°47′14″E
- Owner: Public Transport Authority
- Operator: Transperth
- Lines: Fremantle line Airport line
- Distance: 8.6 kilometres from Perth
- Platforms: 3 (1 island, 1 side)
- Tracks: 3

Construction
- Structure type: Ground

Other information
- Station code: FSG; 99271 (platform 1); 99272 (platform 2); 99273 (platform 3)
- Fare zone: 1

History
- Opened: 2 October 1954
- Rebuilt: 20 September 1995

Passengers
- 2013-14: 82,207

Services
Preceding station	Transperth	Following station
Events
Loch Street towards Perth	Fremantle line	Claremont towards Fremantle
Perth Terminus	Fremantle line Show express	Terminus
Loch Street towards High Wycombe	Airport line	Claremont Terminus
Location

Showgrounds railway station is a railway station on the Transperth network. It is located on the Fremantle line & Airport line, 8.6 kilometres from Perth station adjacent to the Claremont Showground. It is used only when events are held at the Showground, such as the Royal Show.

== History ==
The original Showgrounds station opened on 2 October 1954 on the north side of the Ashton Avenue road bridge. It consisted of two 180 metre platforms with free standing passenger shelters and small administration/storage rooms for staff operating the station during Perth Royal Show week. The construction was part of the conversion of Perth's passenger train system from steam to diesel power, allowing smaller intervals between stations.

The station closed on 1 September 1979 along with the rest of the Fremantle line, re-opening on 29 July 1983 when services were restored. In March 1994, construction of a new Showgrounds station 400 metres south commenced. It opened on 20 September 1995.

From 2034, Showgrounds station's platforms are planned to be extended to the north-east to accommodate six-car trains.

== Services ==
Showgrounds station is served by Transperth Fremantle line services from Fremantle to Perth and Airport line services from Claremont to High Wycombe only during special events, such as the Perth Royal Show.

Showgrounds station saw 82,207 passengers in the 2013–14 financial year.

== Platforms ==
Showgrounds platform arrangement
Stop ID	Platform	Line	Destination	Via	Stopping Pattern	Notes
99271	1	Fremantle line	Perth		+S	Station only open during events at the Claremont Showground.
99271	1	Airport line	High Wycombe	Perth	WS	Station only open during events at the Claremont Showground.
99272	2	Fremantle line	Fremantle		+S	Station only open during events at the Claremont Showground.
99272	2	Airport line	Claremont		WS	Station only open during events at the Claremont Showground.
99273	3	Fremantle line	Perth		SE	Platform only used during the Perth Royal Show. Services run express to Perth and continue to Ellenbrook.

== Bus routes ==
Stop	Route	Destination / description	Notes
[22060] Showgrounds Station Rail replacement service	906	Rail replacement service to Perth station	
[22060] Showgrounds Station Rail replacement service	906	Rail replacement service to Fremantle station	
