= Loch Street railway station =

Railway station in Perth, Western Australia

Loch Street
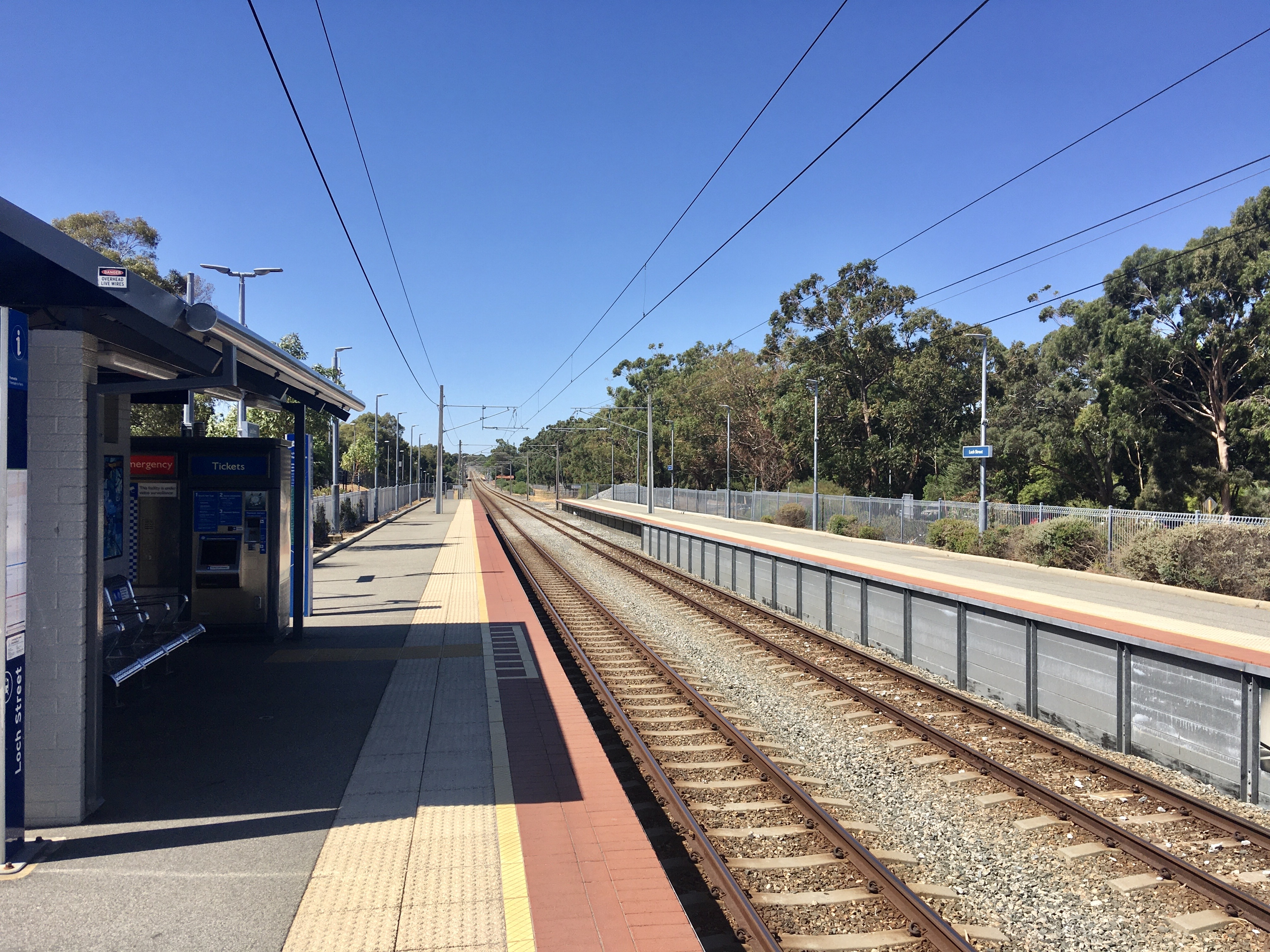
- View from platform 1 looking northeast in March 2022

General information
- Location: Loch Street, Karrakatta; Australia
- Coordinates: 31°58′18″S 115°47′30″E
- Owner: Public Transport Authority
- Operator: Transperth Train Operations
- Lines: Fremantle line Airport line
- Distance: 8.0 kilometres (5.0 mi) from Perth
- Platforms: 2 side
- Tracks: 2

Construction
- Structure type: Ground

Other information
- Fare zone: 1

History
- Opened: 1954

Passengers
- 2013–14: 70,656

Services
Preceding station	Transperth	Following station
Karrakatta towards Perth	Fremantle line	Showgrounds or Claremont towards Fremantle
Karrakatta towards High Wycombe	Airport line	Showgrounds or Claremont towards Claremont
Location
- Location of Loch Street railway station

Loch Street railway station is a railway station on the Transperth network. It is located on the Fremantle and Airport lines, eight kilometres from Perth station serving the suburbs of Claremont, Mount Claremont and Karrakatta.

== History ==
Loch Street station opened in 1954. Its construction was part of the conversion of Perth's passenger train system from steam to diesel power, allowing smaller intervals between stations. On 18 August 2002, Loch Street had its regular services limited due to low passenger numbers, closeness to Karrakatta station (500 metres) and, prior to May 2009, the length of its platforms. The platforms weren't long enough to accommodate four car train sets, resulting in alternate trains skipping the station. Only two car train sets stopped, at night and on weekends. In May 2009, work to extend the platforms was completed.

Since 10 October 2022, the station has been served by Airport line services in addition to the pre-existing Fremantle line services.

From 2034, Loch Street station's platforms are planned to be extended to the north-east to accommodate six-car trains.

== Services ==
Loch Street station is served by the Airport and Fremantle lines on the Transperth network. Services are operated by Transperth Train Operations, a division of the PTA. The Fremantle line runs between Fremantle station and Perth station, continuing past Perth as the Midland line. The Airport line, which commenced regular services on 10 October 2022, goes between High Wycombe station and Claremont station.

Airport line and Fremantle line trains stop at Loch Street every 12 minutes each during peak hour for a combined frequency of a train every 6 minutes. Outside peak hour and on weekends and public holidays, each line has a train every 15 minutes for a combined frequency of 7.5 minutes. Late at night, each line has a half-hourly or hourly frequency.

Loch Street station saw 70,656 passengers in the 2013–14 financial year, making it the second least used station on the Fremantle line, beaten only by its neighbour Karrakatta.

Loch Street platform arrangement
Stop ID	Platform	Line	Destination	Via	Stopping Pattern	Notes
99261	1	Fremantle line	Perth		All stations	
99261	1	Airport line	High Wycombe	Perth	W	
99262	2	Fremantle line	Fremantle		All stations	
99262	2	Airport line	Claremont		W	
