= WAGR ASA class =

Australian steam railcar

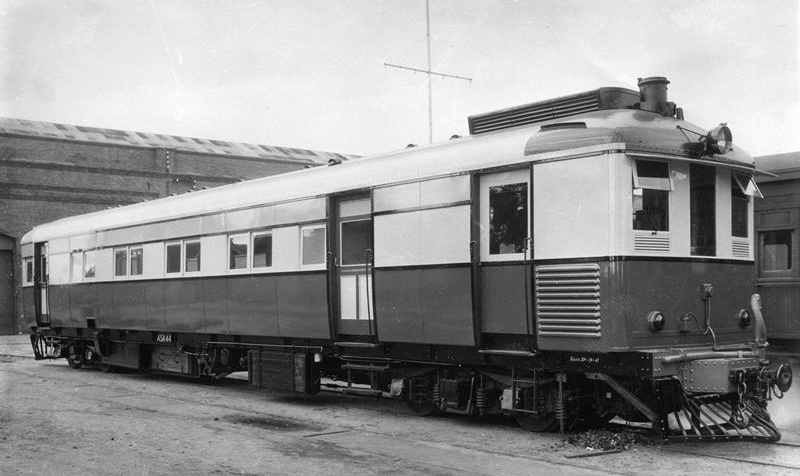
- ASA 445 outside the Midland Railway Workshops
- Stock type: Steam railcar
- In service: 1931–1954
- Manufacturer: Sentinal Cammell Co.
- Replaced: ADG class railcar
- Entered service: 1931
- Refurbished: 1951
- Number built: 1
- Number preserved: 1
- Design code: ASA
- Fleet numbers: ASA 445
- Capacity: 52 seated, 12 standing
- Operator: WAGR

Specifications
- Car body construction: Steel
- Train length: 64 feet 1 1/4 inches (19.539 m)
- Width: 8 feet 5 5/8 inches (2.581 m)
- Height: 12 feet 7 7/8 inches (3.858 m)
- Floor height: 3 feet 6 inches (1.07 m)
- Doors: 2 per side
- Wheel diameter: 2 feet 7 1/2 inches (0.800 m)
- Wheelbase: 46 feet 7 inches (14.20 m)
- Weight: 31 long tons 14 cwt (71,000 lb or 32.2 t)
- Power output: 100 horsepower (75 kW)
- Tractive effort: 6,274 pounds-force (27.91 kN)
- Track gauge: 1,067 mm (3 ft 6 in)

The WAGR ASA class was a steam railcar operated between 1931 and about 1954 by the Western Australian Government Railways (WAGR). In 1959, it was converted into track recording car ALT 88. It was withdrawn from service in 1992 and sent to Boyanup Transport Museum for preservation. Of steel construction and a capacity of 52 seated and 12 standing passengers, the railcar was purchased from the Sentinal Cammell Co. of England to reduce the cost of providing a suburban service during quieter periods of the day.

The boiler was superheated, with a working pressure of 300psi (2068kPa) and positioned in the driver's cab adjacent the luggage compartment and toilet. The boiler supplies a 6-cylinder steam engine of 6 inch (152mm) bore, and 7 inch (178mm) stroke. The vehicle carried 400 gallons (1818 litres) of water in an under floor tank and 1 ton (1.01t) of coal in the bunker accessible near the boiler.
