= Claremont railway station, Perth =

Railway station in Perth, Western Australia

Claremont
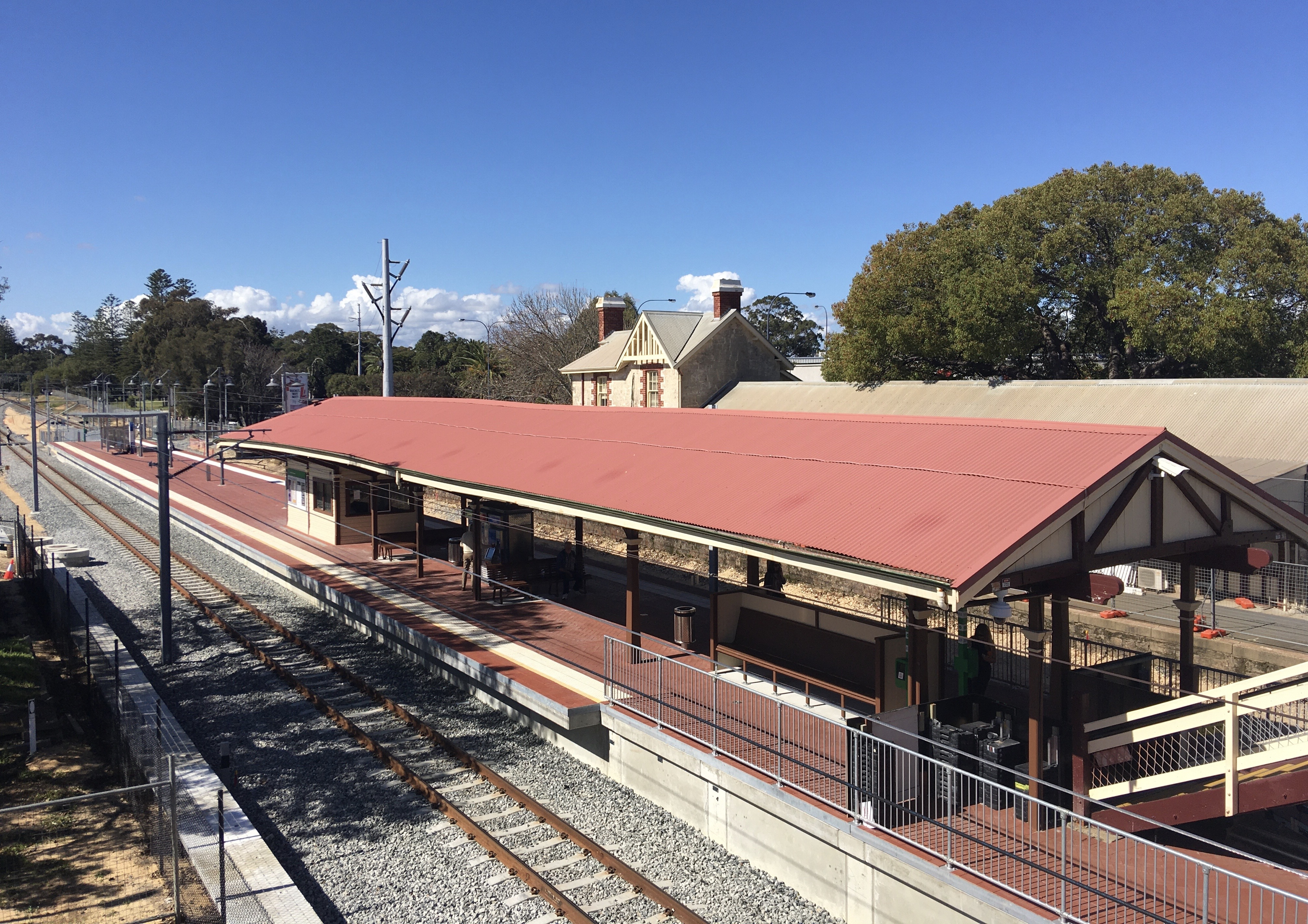
- Eastbound view of Platform 1 and the island platform main shelter, viewed from the pedestrian overpass, August 2021

General information
- Location: Gugeri Street, Claremont, Western Australia; Australia
- Coordinates: 31°58′51″S 115°46′53″E
- Owner: Public Transport Authority
- Operator: Transperth Train Operations
- Lines: Fremantle line Airport line
- Distance: 9.3 kilometres (5.8 mi) from Perth
- Platforms: 2 (1 island)
- Tracks: 2

Construction
- Structure type: Ground
- Architectural style: Federation

Other information
- Fare zone: 1

History
- Opened: 1886
- Former names: Butlers Swamp

Passengers
- 2013-14: 579,729

Services
Preceding station	Transperth	Following station
Showgrounds or Loch Street towards Perth	Fremantle line	Swanbourne towards Fremantle
Showgrounds or Loch Street towards High Wycombe	Airport line	Terminus

Western Australia Heritage Register
- Type: State Registered Place
- Designated: 20 December 2002
- Reference no.: 486
Location
- Location of Claremont railway station

Claremont railway station is a railway station on the Transperth network in Western Australia. It is located on the Fremantle and Airport lines, 9.3 kilometres from Perth station serving the suburb of Claremont.

== History ==
Claremont station opened in 1881 as Butlers Swamp, being renamed Claremont in 1883. In 1886 a new station was constructed 300 metres to the east. The 1886 buildings are now the oldest extant railway station buildings in Perth. It was the only station on the line to be built with a crossing loop.

With the relocation of the Royal Perth Show to the Claremont Showground in 1905, a third platform was added with the station serving the show until Showgrounds station opened in 1954. The station closed on 1 September 1979 along with the rest of the Fremantle line, re-opening on 29 July 1983 when services were restored. The station building was restored at the same time. When the line was electrified in 1991, the station was cut back to one island platform and the original platform abandoned.

After the Town of Claremont's Council Chambers were gutted by fire in 2010, it relocated its administration to the former station master's building. The former goods shed has been converted into a cultural centre and cafe.

=== Redevelopment ===
The Airport line was originally planned to terminate at Daglish station, as there was already a turnback siding there. In 2018, it was announced that the terminus had been moved to Claremont station. This required an upgrade of the station to modern accessibility standards and the construction of two turnback sidings west of the station. Claremont station was chosen as it is located halfway along the Fremantle line and is the line's third busiest station, after Fremantle and Subiaco. Perth station does not have the space for trains to turn around and stations beyond Claremont do not have a high enough forecast patronage for the extra services for those stations to be worth purchasing more rolling stock.

In August 2020, John Holland Group was awarded a $36 million contract to undertake the construction works at Claremont station. From 5 February to 5 April 2021, Claremont station was closed and the Fremantle line was partially shut down to complete the upgrade of Claremont station and build the two turnback sidings. The Fremantle line reopened to full service on 6 April, but Claremont station remained closed as workers discovered problems with the station's original construction. Claremont station reopened on 1 June 2021.

From 2034, Claremont station's platforms are planned to be extended to the east to accommodate six-car trains.

== Station location ==
Claremont station is located in the middle of Claremont. The railway's right-of-way lies between two arterial roads: Shenton Road and Gugeri Street. There are two access points to the station from each street: a grade level track crossing through electrically activated gates at the eastern end of the station, and the original pedestrian bridge that provides access by stairs to the platform and to the elevated signal box. Additionally, a pedestrian underpass connects both streets west of the station.

== Services ==
Claremont station is served by the Airport and Fremantle lines on the Transperth network. Services are operated by Transperth Train Operations, a division of the PTA. The Fremantle line runs between Fremantle station and Perth station, continuing past Perth as the Midland line. The Airport line, which commenced regular services on 10 October 2022, goes between High Wycombe station and Claremont station.

Airport line and Fremantle line trains stop at Claremont every 12 minutes each during peak hour for a combined frequency of a train every 6 minutes. Outside peak hour and on weekends and public holidays, each line has a train every 15 minutes for a combined frequency of 7.5 minutes. Late at night, each line has a half-hourly or hourly frequency.

Claremont station saw 579,729 passengers in the 2013–14 financial year.

Claremont platform arrangement
Stop ID	Platform	Line	Destination	Via	Stopping Pattern	Notes
99281	1	Fremantle line	Perth		All stations	
99281	1	Airport line	High Wycombe	Perth	W	
99282	2	Fremantle line	Fremantle		All stations	
99282	2	Airport line	Terminates		W	

== Bus routes ==
Stop	Route	Destination / description	Notes
[28524] Stand 1	103	to Elizabeth Quay Bus Station via Stirling Highway & Thomas Road	
[28524] Stand 1	995	to Elizabeth Quay Bus Station via Stirling Highway	
[28524] Stand 1	906	Rail replacement service to Perth station	
[28525] Stand 2	998	CircleRoute to Galleria Bus Station via Shenton Park & Stirling Station	
[28526] Stand 3	23	to Elizabeth Quay Bus Station via Dalkeith & Shenton Park	
[28526] Stand 3	24	to East Perth via Dalkeith & Shenton Park	
[28526] Stand 3	25	to Shenton Park Station via Nedlands	
[28527] Stand 4	27	to East Perth via Swanbourne & Mount Claremont	
[28527] Stand 4	28	to Perth Busport via Mount Claremont & Floreat	
[28529] Stand 5	999	to CircleRoute to Fremantle Station via Stirling Highway	
[28529] Stand 5	906	Rail replacement service to Fremantle station	
[28528] Stand 6	102	to Cottesloe station via Marine Parade	
[28528] Stand 6	107	to Fremantle station via Peppermint Grove	
