= List of Transperth railway stations =

Transperth rail map

Transperth is the public transport system serving Perth, Western Australia. The Transperth rail network is owned and operated by the Public Transport Authority (PTA), a state government agency. It has 85 stations and eight lines which radiate out from the central station of Perth. The lines are the Airport, Armadale, Ellenbrook, Fremantle, Mandurah, Midland, Thornlie–Cockburn, and Yanchep lines. From June 2022 to June 2023, the Transperth rail network had 53.2 million boardings.

== History ==
The first railway to open in the Perth area was the Eastern Railway, which opened in 1881 between Fremantle to Guildford via Perth, forming the modern-day Fremantle and Midland lines. This was later extended past Midland and suburban services were extended to Midland in 1904 and 1905. The South Western Railway was opened between Perth and Bunbury in 1893. Suburban services initially ran as far as Cannington, but were extended over the following decades to reach Armadale station by the 1950s to form the Armadale line.

Initially served by steam trains, diesel railcars began running on 28 November 1954. This allowed for smaller spacing between stations, and so seven new stations opened on that day: Ashfield, Higham (now known as Beckenham station), Grant Street, Stokely, Loch Street, Oats Street, and Victoria Street. The Fremantle line was closed on 2 September 1979 due to declining patronage, but it was reopened on 29 July 1983 after a public outcry. The network was electrified in the early 1990s, and the Yanchep line opened on 20 December 1992 as the Joondalup line with three stations operational: Leederville, Edgewater, and Joondalup. The remaining stations between Perth and Joondalup opened on 21 March 1993, and an extension to Currambine station opened on 8 August 1993. Subiaco station was rebuilt in the late 1990s, opening on 9 December 1998 as Perth's first underground station.

A number of new stations opened in the 2000s under the New MetroRail project. This included an extension of the Joondalup line to Clarkson on 4 October 2004, a branch off the Armadale line to Thornlie on 7 August 2005, and the 72-kilometre (45 mi) Mandurah line, which opened in 2007. The first section of the Mandurah line, which was the two underground stations (Perth Underground and Elizabeth Quay), opened on 15 October 2007, and the second section, which was the nine stations between Elizabeth Quay and Mandurah, which opened on 23 December 2007. On 21 September 2014, an extension of the Joondalup line to Butler opened.

Another large increase in the station count occurred under the Metronet program in the 2020s. This included the Airport line, a three-station branch off the Midland line that opened on 9 October 2022, a three-station extension of the Joondalup line (renamed to the Yanchep line) to Yanchep that opened on 14 July 2024, the Ellenbrook line, a five-station branch off the Midland line which opened on 8 December 2024, an extension of the Thornlie line (renamed the Thornlie–Cockburn line) to link up to the Mandurah line with two new stations which opened on 8 June 2025, and an extension of the Armadale line by one station to Byford which was completed on 12 October 2025. Additionally, five stations along the Armadale line were rebuilt and one station was closed as part of the Victoria Park-Canning Level Crossing Removal Project, which temporarily closed the Armadale line for 18 months from November 2023 to October 2025.

== Stations ==
There are 85 Transperth railway stations. 39 of those stations have bus transfers. Five of those stations are underground: Airport Central, Elizabeth Quay, Perth Underground, Redcliffe, and Subiaco stations. Showgrounds station only operates during events at the Claremont Showground.

The Armadale, Fremantle, and Midland lines are known as the "heritage lines" as they were constructed long before the other lines. Over half the stations on the heritage lines have poor disabled accessibility despite all stations having step-free access. Factors limiting accessibility include non-compliant ramps, a lack of tactile paving, large platform gaps, and pedestrian level crossings. Perth station is accessible with the exception of platform four, which is used by the Armadale line. All stations along the Thornlie Cockburn line and inner section of the Armadale Line are now accessible thanks to a wide program of upgrades and station rebuilds, with the exception of McIver and Burswood. 7 stations along the temporarily closed outer Armadale line remain inaccessible. 13 stations on the Fremantle line remain inaccessible, with the exceptions being Fremantle, Subiaco, and West Leederville stations. Eight stations along the Midland line are also not accessible, with the exceptions being Bassendean, Bayswater, Claisebrook, East Perth, Maylands, and Midland stations. All stations along the Ellenbrook and Airport line branches, Mandurah line and the Yanchep line are accessible except Edgewater, Leederville, and Stirling stations.

All stations along the Ellenbrook and Airport line branches, the Yanchep line, the Mandurah line and the Thornlie-Cockburn Line (except McIver, Claisebrook, Burswood and Victoria Park) have 150-metre (490 ft) long platforms, which are long enough for six car trains, the longest trains used on the network. Most stations along the heritage lines have platforms which are only 100 metres (330 ft) long, limiting the length of trains that can be used on those lines. The exceptions are Bayswater, East Perth, Perth (except Platforms 3 and 4), West Leederville, Perth Stadium, Carlisle, Oats Street, Queens Park, Cannington, Beckenham, Armadale and Byford stations. The other stations are planned to be lengthened eventually as part of a wider upgrade project on the heritage lines.

== List of current stations ==
§ Special events station

Station	Image	Served by	Distance from Perth		Location	Opened	Notes
Station	Image	Served by	km	mi	Location	Opened	Notes
Airport Central	Airport Central station interior viewed from station concourse. The interior consists of white walls with large windows high up.	Airport line	13.4	8.3	Perth Airport	9 Oct 2022	
Alkimos	Alkimos station under construction drone shot	Yanchep line	43.9	26.7	Alkimos	14 July 2024	Bus interchange
Armadale	An elevated station	Armadale line	30.4	18.9	Armadale	1893	Bus interchange Transwa Australind (from 2026)
Ashfield	Ashfield station platform shelter	Midland line	9.3	5.8	Ashfield, Bassendean	28 Nov 1954	
Aubin Grove	Aubin Grove station western entrance	Mandurah line	23.8	14.8	Atwell, Success	23 Apr 2017	Bus interchange
Ballajura	Ground level station with a covered footbridge	Ellenbrook line	15.9	9.9	Whiteman	8 Dec 2024	Bus interchange
Bassendean	Bassendean station viewed from platform with large shelter on the platform and fare gates in the distance	Midland line	10.8	6.7	Bassendean	30 Apr 1910	Bus interchange Originally named West Guildford. Renamed to Bassendean in 1922.
Bayswater	Bayswater station platform with a train	Airport line Ellenbrook line Midland line	6.7	4.2	Bayswater	1896	Bus interchange Rebuilt station opened on 8 October 2023
Beckenham	Beckenham station platform shelter	Armadale line Thornlie–Cockburn line	13.6	8.5	Beckenham	28 Nov 1954	Originally named Higham.
Bull Creek	Bull Creek station platform	Mandurah line	11.7	7.3	Bateman, Bull Creek	23 Dec 2007	Bus interchange
Burswood	Burswood station platform	Armadale line Thornlie–Cockburn line	4.6	2.9	Burswood	1893	Originally named Burswood. Renamed to Rivervale in 1906, on 30 May 1923 or in April 1929. Renamed to Burswood on 1 May 1994.
Butler	Butler station building long shot	Yanchep line	40.7	25.3	Butler	21 Sep 2014	Bus interchange
Byford		Armadale line	38.4	24.0	Byford	12 October 2025	Bus interchange Transwa Australind (from 2026) Line terminus
Canning Bridge	Canning Bridge station bridge over platforms	Mandurah line	7.2	4.5	Como	23 Dec 2007	Bus interchange
Cannington	Train at Cannington station platforms	Armadale line Thornlie–Cockburn line	12.2	7.6	Cannington, East Cannington	1897	Bus interchange
Carlisle	Carlisle station platform	Armadale line Thornlie–Cockburn line	7.4	4.6	Carlisle, East Victoria Park	1912	Originally named Mint Street. Renamed to East Victoria Park in 1912. Renamed to Carlisle in April 1919.
Challis	Challis station platform shelter	Armadale line	27.3	17.0	Kelmscott	29 Oct 1973	
City West	City West platform at night	Airport line Fremantle line	1.6	1.0	West Perth	18 Jun 1986	Originally named West Perth. Renamed to City West on 19 November 1987.
Claisebrook	Claisebrook station platform shelter	Airport line Armadale line Ellenbrook line Midland line Thornlie–Cockburn line	1.3	0.8	East Perth, Perth	1883	Originally named East Perth. Renamed to Claisebrook in 1969.
Claremont	Claremont station platform shelter viewed from bridge	Airport line Fremantle line	9.4	5.8	Claremont	1886	Bus interchange Originally named Butler's Swamp. Renamed to Claremont in 1882/1883.Airport Line Western Terminus
Clarkson	Clarkson station platform shelter	Yanchep line	33.2	20.6	Clarkson	4 Oct 2004	Bus interchange
Cockburn Central	Cockburn Central station western entrance	Mandurah line Thornlie–Cockburn line	20.5	12.7	Cockburn Central, Jandakot	23 Dec 2007	Bus interchangeThornlie-Cockburn Line Terminus
Cottesloe	Cottesloe station platform viewed from bridge	Fremantle line	12.4	7.7	Cottesloe	c. 1890	Bus interchange
Currambine	Currambine station platform and shelter	Yanchep line	29.2	18.1	Currambine, Joondalup	8 Aug 1993	
Daglish	Daglish station platform shelter	Airport line Fremantle line	4.9	3.0	Daglish, Subiaco	14 Jul 1924	
East Guildford	Small station platform shelter	Midland line	14.1	8.8	Guildford	1898	Originally named Woodbridge. Renamed East Guildford in 1908.
East Perth	East Perth station platform and concourse long shot	Airport line Ellenbrook line Midland line	2.1	1.3	East Perth, Perth	1969	Built in 1969, this station was originally named Perth Terminal. Changed name to East Perth Terminal on 14 August 1989. The new suburban station is called East Perth. East Perth Terminal is located next to the station for state and interstate travel.
Edgewater	Edgewater station platform and shelter	Yanchep line	22.9	14.2	Edgewater, Heathridge	20 Dec 1992	
Eglinton	Station building and entrance, July 2024	Yanchep line	46.7	29.0	Eglinton	14 July 2024	Bus interchange
Elizabeth Quay	Elizabeth Quay station underground platform	Yanchep line Mandurah line	0.6	0.4	Perth	15 Oct 2007	Bus interchange Originally named Esplanade. Renamed to Elizabeth Quay in January 2016. Underground
Ellenbrook	Ellenbrook station entrance	Ellenbrook line	27.9	17.3	Ellenbrook	8 Dec 2024	Bus interchangeEllenbrook Line Terminus
Fremantle	Fremantle station entrance building	Fremantle line	19.0	11.8	Fremantle	1907	Bus interchangeFremantle Line Terminus
Glendalough	Glendalough station platform under shelter	Yanchep line	5.6	3.5	Glendalough, Osborne Park, Mount Hawthorn	21 Mar 1993	Bus interchange
Gosnells	Gosnells station platforms	Armadale line	20.7	12.9	Gosnells	17 Apr 2005	Bus interchange Original station opened in 1905. Station relocated 300 metres (980 ft) northeast in 2005.
Grant Street	Grant Street station platforms	Fremantle line	11.2	7.0	Cottesloe	28 Nov 1954	
Greenwood	Greenwood station platforms under shelter	Yanchep line	17.7	11.0	Duncraig, Greenwood, Kingsley, Padbury	29 Jan 2005	
Guildford	Small maroon brick platform shelter	Midland line	12.6	7.8	Guildford	1881	
High Wycombe	Tiled station platform with large architectural shelter and trains docked at both sides	Airport line	15.8	9.8	High Wycombe	9 Oct 2022	Bus interchangeAirport Line Eastern Terminus
Joondalup	Looking down on Joondalup station platform from ground level	Yanchep line	26.2	16.3	Joondalup	20 Dec 1992	Bus interchange
Karrakatta	Karrakatta station platforms	Airport line Fremantle line	7.6	4.7	Karrakatta	1896	
Kelmscott	Kelmscott station shelter	Armadale line	25.8	16.0	Kelmscott	2 May 1893	Bus interchange
Kenwick	Kenwick station platform 2	Armadale line	15.6	9.7	Kenwick	1914	
Kwinana	Kwinana station entrance	Mandurah line	32.9	20.4	Bertram, Parmelia	23 Dec 2007	Bus interchange
Lakelands	Lakelands station platform and overpass	Mandurah line	64.5	40.1	Lakelands	11 Jun 2023	Bus interchange
Leederville	Leederville station platform	Yanchep line	2.4	1.5	Leederville, West Leederville	20 Dec 1992	Bus interchange
Loch Street	Station platforms with small shelter	Airport line Fremantle line	8.0	5.0	Claremont, Karrakatta	28 Nov 1954	
Maddington	Maddington station platform	Armadale line	17.6	10.9	Maddington	1896	Bus interchange
Mandurah	Long shot of Mandurah station from bridge	Mandurah line	70.8	44.0	Mandurah	23 Dec 2007	Bus interchangeMandurah Line Terminus
Maylands	Maylands station southern entrance	Airport line Ellenbrook line Midland line	4.5	2.8	Maylands	1896	Originally named 15 mile Siding. Renamed to Falkirk in 1897. Renamed to Maylands in 1899.
McIver	McIver station platforms	Airport line Armadale line Ellenbrook line Midland line Thornlie–Cockburn line	0.7	0.4	Perth	1 Sep 1989	
Meltham	Meltham station platform shot	Airport line Ellenbrook line Midland line	5.5	3.4	Bayswater	14 Jun 1948	
Midland	Train stopped at concrete platform with shelter running along the platform	Midland line	16.1	10.0	Midland	1968	Bus interchangeMidland Line Terminus
Morley	Morley station platform	Ellenbrook line	10.3	6.4	Embleton, Morley	8 Dec 2024	Bus interchange
Mosman Park	Mosman Park station platforms	Fremantle line	13.6	8.5	Cottesloe, Mosman Park	1895	Originally named Cottesloe Beach. Renamed to Buckland Hill in 1931. Renamed to Mosman Park in 1937.
Mount Lawley	Mount Lawley station shelter	Airport line Ellenbrook line Midland line	3.2	2.0	Mount Lawley	1968	Originally opened in 1907. Rebuilt 300 metres (980 ft) northwest in 1968. Originally named Fenian's Crossing.
Murdoch	Murdoch station platform and shelter	Mandurah line	13.9	8.6	Leeming, Murdoch	23 Dec 2007	Bus interchange
Noranda	Noranda station platform	Ellenbrook line	12.8	8.0	Morley, Noranda	8 Dec 2024	Bus interchange
Nicholson Road	The station concourse viewed from the north end of the platform	Thornlie–Cockburn line	20.3	12.6	Canning Vale	8 June 2025	Bus interchange
North Fremantle	Signs outside North Fremantle station	Fremantle line	16.1	10.0	North Fremantle	28 Jul 1991	
Oats Street	Oats Street station	Armadale line Thornlie–Cockburn line	8.1	5.0	Carlisle, East Victoria Park	28 Nov 1954	Bus interchange
Perth	Perth station platforms	Airport line Armadale line Ellenbrook line Fremantle line Yanchep line Midland line Thornlie–Cockburn line	0.0	0.0	Perth	1 Mar 1881	Bus interchange
Perth Stadium	Perth Stadium station concourse long shot	Armadale line Thornlie–Cockburn line	3.3	2.1	Burswood	2 Dec 2017	
Perth Underground	Perth Underground station concourse	Yanchep line Mandurah line	0.0	0.0	Perth	15 Oct 2007	Bus interchange Underground
Queens Park	Queens Park station platform	Armadale line Thornlie–Cockburn line	11.3	7.0	Cannington, Queens Park	1899	Originally named Woodlupine. Renamed to Queens Park on 16 April 1912.
Ranford Road	Station under construction viewed from a bridge	Thornlie–Cockburn line	23.2	14.4	Canning Vale	8 June 2025	Bus interchange
Redcliffe	Underground station platform with escalators and stairs going up to ground level concourse	Airport line	10.7	6.6	Redcliffe	9 Oct 2022	Bus interchange Underground
Rockingham	Rockingham station platforms and shelter	Mandurah line	43.2	26.8	Cooloongup, Rockingham	23 Dec 2007	Bus interchange
Seaforth	Two platforms with small shelters	Armadale line	22.6	14.0	Gosnells	4 May 1948	
Shenton Park	Shenton Park station platform	Airport line Fremantle line	6.0	3.7	Shenton Park	1908	Bus interchange Originally named West Subiaco. Renamed to Shenton Park in 1934.
Sherwood	Sherwood station platforms	Armadale line	28.6	17.8	Armadale	1973	Originally named Kingsley.
Showgrounds§	Showgrounds station entrance	Airport line Fremantle line	8.7	5.4	Claremont	20 Sep 1995	Only used during events at Claremont Showground
Stirling	Stirling station platform and shelter	Yanchep line	8.8	5.5	Innaloo, Osborne Park, Stirling	21 Mar 1993	Bus interchange
Subiaco	Subiaco station shelter	Airport line Fremantle line	3.6	2.2	Subiaco	9 Dec 1998	Bus interchange Underground
Success Hill	Small platform shelter	Midland line	11.7	7.3	Bassendean	1960	
Swanbourne	Swanbourne station platforms viewed from bridge	Fremantle line	10.5	6.6	Claremont, Swanbourne	1904	Originally named Congdon Street. Renamed to Osborne in 1911/12. Renamed to Swanbourne in 1921.
Thornlie	Thornlie station entrance	Thornlie–Cockburn line	17.0	10.6	Thornlie	7 Aug 2005	Bus interchange
Victoria Park	Victoria Park station entrance	Armadale line Thornlie–Cockburn line	6.1	3.8	Lathlain, Victoria Park	2 Aug 2008	Original station opened in 1898. Rebuilt 230 metres (750 ft) southeast in 2007 and 2008.
Victoria Street	Victoria Street station platforms	Fremantle line	14.2	8.8	Cottesloe, Mosman Park	28 Nov 1954	
Warnbro	Warnbro station platforms and shelter	Mandurah line	47.5	29.5	Warnbro	23 Dec 2007	Bus interchange
Warwick	Warwick station platform under shelter	Yanchep line	14.5	9.0	Carine, Duncraig, Hamersley, Warwick	21 Mar 1993	Bus interchange
Wellard	Wellard station long shot	Mandurah line	37.1	23.1	Wellard	23 Dec 2007	Bus interchange
West Leederville	West Leederville station platforms	Airport line Fremantle line	2.7	1.7	Subiaco, West Leederville	1897	Originally named Leederville. Renamed West Leederville in 1912/1913.
Whiteman Park	Elevated train station	Ellenbrook line	21.6	13.4	Whiteman Park	8 Dec 2024	Bus interchange, heritage tram
Whitfords	Whitfords station platform and shelter long shot	Yanchep line	19.8	12.3	Craigie, Kingsley, Padbury, Woodvale	21 Mar 1993	Bus interchange
Woodbridge	Small platform shelter	Midland line	15.4	9.6	Woodbridge	1903	Originally named West Midland. Renamed to Woodbridge in 2004.
Yanchep	A station with three platforms in a trench	Yanchep line	54.5	33.9	Yanchep	14 July 2024	Bus interchangeLine Terminus

== List of future stations ==
List of future stations
Station	Image	Line	Location	Planned construction start	Notes
Karnup		Mandurah line	Karnup	2028	Bus interchange

== See also ==
- List of Transwa railway stations
- List of closed railway stations in Perth
- List of Transperth bus stations

== Sources ==
- Higham, Geoffrey (2007). Marble Bar to Mandurah: A History of Passenger Rail Services in Western Australia (1st ed.). Bassendean: Rail Heritage WA. ISBN 978-0-9803922-0-3. OCLC 271545712. Wikidata Q140375689.
