= 1979–1983 Fremantle railway line closure =

Railway service suspension in Western Australia

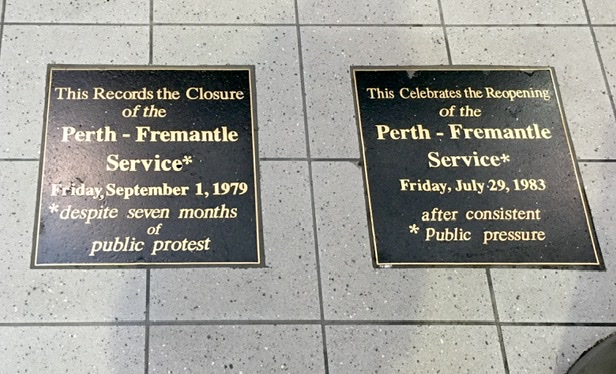
Plaques at Perth station commemorating the closure and reopening of the Fremantle line

On 2 September 1979, the Fremantle line, a suburban railway line in Perth, was closed by the Liberal Government of Western Australia due to a claimed lack of patronage and cost effectiveness. The line was reopened on 29 July 1983 following the election of a Labor government at the 1983 state election.

== Background ==
By the late 1970s, Perth's rail network had received little investment. The three railway lines, the Armadale, Fremantle, and Midland lines, were served by aging diesel railcars. In 1977, the premier of Western Australia, Charles Court, promised that the Fremantle line would not be closed. That year, the Fremantle line's average weekday patronage was 9,900 and the yearly patronage was 2.5 million.

== Before closure ==
On 16 January 1979, Court announced the closure of the Fremantle line. Passenger services were planned to end on 1 September 1979 and be replaced by buses the following day. The line would remain open to freight trains for two more years while a narrow-gauge link to Fremantle was built to the south. A highway was planned to eventually be built in the railway line's place to relieve traffic on Stirling Highway, although there was no timeline for that. The decision was made based on the cost of providing the service, which was an estimated $2.7 million in the 1978–79 financial year. The Fremantle line carried 3.9 percent of Perth's public transport patronage but was responsible for 9.4 percent of the system's deficit. The date was chosen to be before that year's Royal Show so that the bus system could be tested during the show.

The announcement attracted criticism from the state Opposition, the Labor Party at the time, and the Australian Railways Union, although the state government had told the union that workers would be redeployed to other parts of Westrail. The union's secretary said that the government should work on increasing the patronage of the Fremantle line and encourage people to switch from driving. The leader of the opposition, Ron Davies, claimed that the Fremantle line's closure was a precursor to closing the Armadale and Midland lines as well. He later said it was "incongruous" that the government was closing the line while the rest of the world was looking at rail as the most efficient form of public transport. The federal member for Fremantle, John Dawkins, said that the decision to close the railway was "short-sighted and foolish and would eventually be proved wrong". Subiaco Liberal MP Tom Dadour labelled the closure as "illogical" and called for a referendum to be held.

Four days after the announcement, there was a protest organised by Dawkins at Pioneer Reserve opposite Fremantle railway station. Over 450 people were estimated to be at the protest.

City of Subiaco mayor Richard Diggins expressed concern that the closure would result in roads crossing the railway line being widened, which would increase traffic through Subiaco, as well as the new highway creating a further divide between the suburbs along the alignment. The City of Nedlands council was initially ambivalent, pointing out that the reserve was wide enough for both a highway and a railway. By July, the Nedlands council had voted to oppose the dismantling of the Fremantle line, but fell short of voting to oppose the closure itself. In June, the Town of Claremont council also voted to oppose the closure.

In July, the Town of Claremont held a meeting with about 150 ratepayers, to which the minister for transport, Cyril Rushton, and the convenor of Friends of the Railway, Peter Newman, attended. To assuage the ratepayers' concerns, Rushton said the closure would be on a trial basis, contrasting with previous pronouncements by ministers that the closure was permanent.

According to the Post, Westrail staff had told the newspaper that the decision to close the Fremantle line was made based on false figures, and that Westrail was not asked to provide an assessment before the government made the decision. Staff also said that the government's claim that $3.6 million per year would be saved was false.

The line closed to passenger services on schedule. The last passenger train to run on the line departed Perth station at 11:50 pm, 1 September, and arrived at Fremantle station at 12:29 am the following day.

== During closure ==
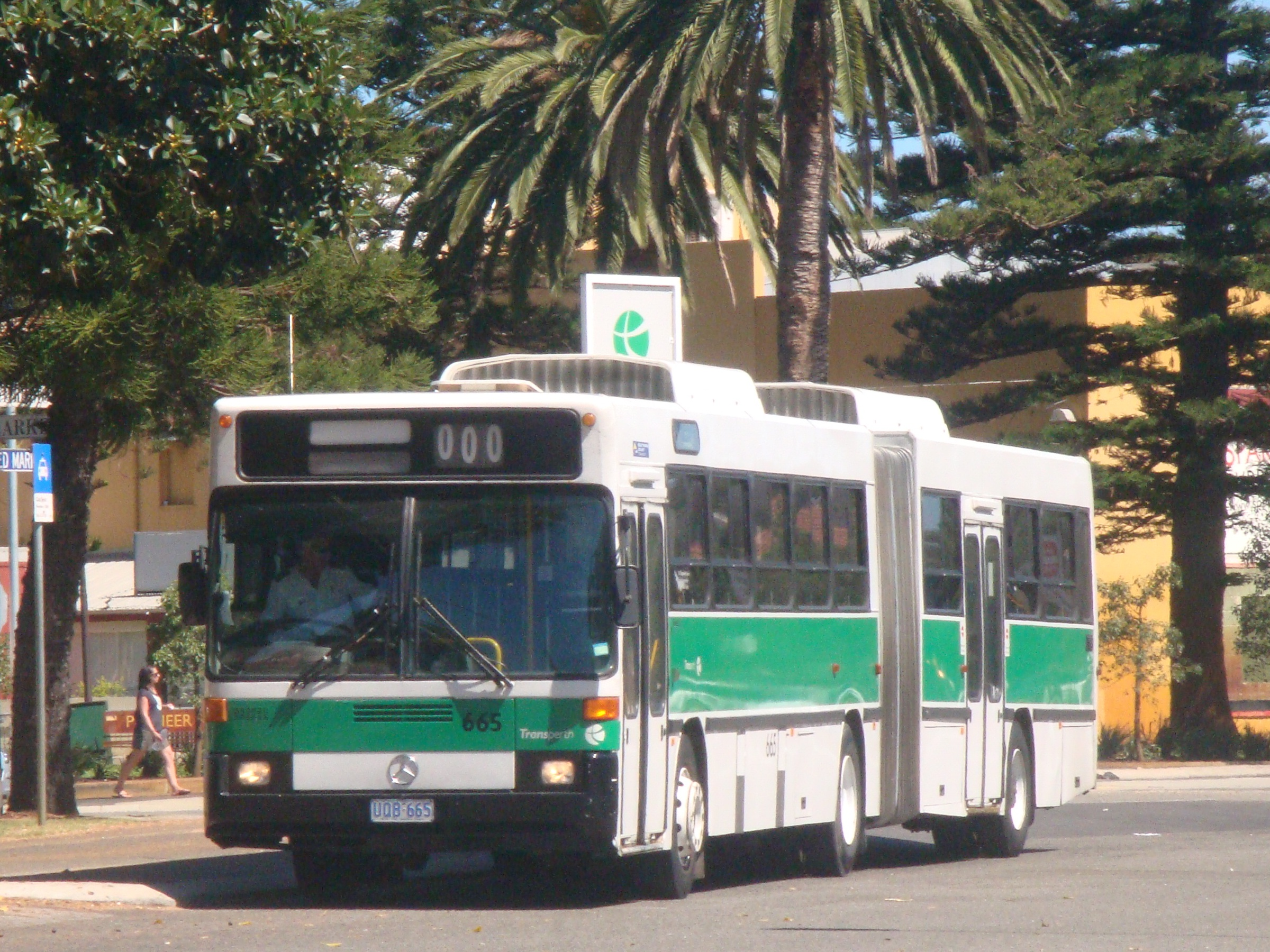
A Mercedes-Benz O305G bus in Fremantle, pictured in 2012

A map of the train replacement bus route

Seventeen articulated Mercedes-Benz O305G buses were acquired by the Metropolitan Transport Trust (MTT) to provide for replacement bus services. The bus services were planned to follow the railway line as closely as possible and be at least as frequent as the train service. The rolling stock used on the Fremantle line was planned to be used elsewhere on the suburban rail network. It was later announced that those buses would be leased for $2.2 million.

Branded as "Linc buses", the new bus service began on 2 September 1979. The route was originally planned to follow the railway line as closely as possible, which required dismantling sidings and building a new busway in the rail reserve in Claremont and Swanbourne. This was not able to be done, as the Australian Railways Union had placed a ban on dismantling the Fremantle line. The route the buses followed leaving Fremantle was thus Queen Victoria Street, Stirling Highway, Loch Street, Railway Road, Roberts Road, and Wellington Street, ending at Bennett Street. This route bypassed Cottesloe, Grant Street, Swanbourne and Claremont stations, although there were roads parallel to the railway line there that the union said could have been used.

== Reopening ==
During the 1983 state election, Labor leader Brian Burke promised to reopen the Fremantle line, which was reiterated following Labor's election victory. Over $800,000 was spent refurbishing the line, stations and trains before the reopening. The stations had been kept in decent condition. The Fremantle line reopened on 29 July 1983. The first train departed Fremantle station at 11:13 am with Labor MP Ken McIver, a former train driver, driving, and Burke and Subiaco Liberal MP Tom Dadour in the driver's cab. The initial frequency was every 15 minutes during peak, 20 minutes outside peak, and every 45 minutes at night. On Saturdays, the frequency was every half-hour, and on Sundays, the frequency was every hour.

Shadow Transport Minister Ian Laurance labelled the reopening as "an act of financial vandalism", and said that if the government really wanted to reopen the line anyway, it should wait until the third quarter of 1984 so that new rolling stock could be used. The West Australian Football League's general manager welcomed the reopening, saying that trains do not cause the congestion that buses do. The Royal Agricultural Society's president said that the trains would make it easier for people to get to the Perth Royal Show in Claremont.

== Aftermath ==
Court never regretted the decision to close the Fremantle line. He said that he "never regretted what we did, but I realise it brought a lot of pain with it from a political point of view because it's so easy to stir up emotions. Most of the people that signed the petition had probably never been on the train."

On the other hand, George Shea, the head of the MTT at the time, said that the reopening and electrification was "100 percent right" and that he "acted on the wrong advice from overseas. I was waiting for the city to have three million people".
