= List of closed railway stations in Perth =

This is a list of stations that have been closed since the building of railways in metropolitan Perth, Western Australia.

== Mundaring line ==
In some cases there are stations that were so effectively removed that there are no traces left, such as Bellevue. However, at Mundaring and Darlington, concrete platform edges remain.

Although Mundaring branch railway stations were closed in 1954, it was not until the 1960s that the line was formally closed, and the line and stations removed after that.

== Metropolitan lines ==
The lines to Karragullen along the Upper Darling Range railway, and to Chidlow (via Parkerville or Mundaring), were considered to be part of the metropolitan service by the Western Australian Government Railways administration at the time they were operating.

== Section closures ==
In some cases single stations were closed for logistical reasons; generally it was a group of stations when a section of railway was closed.

=== 1881–1930 ===
- Fremantle railway station at Cliff Street (1881–1907), demolished upon the construction of the new Fremantle railway station at Market St.
- East Fremantle (1881–1907), rebuilt 1886, removed upon the construction of the new Fremantle railway station at Market St.

=== 1930–1949 ===
==== Upper Darling Range line ====
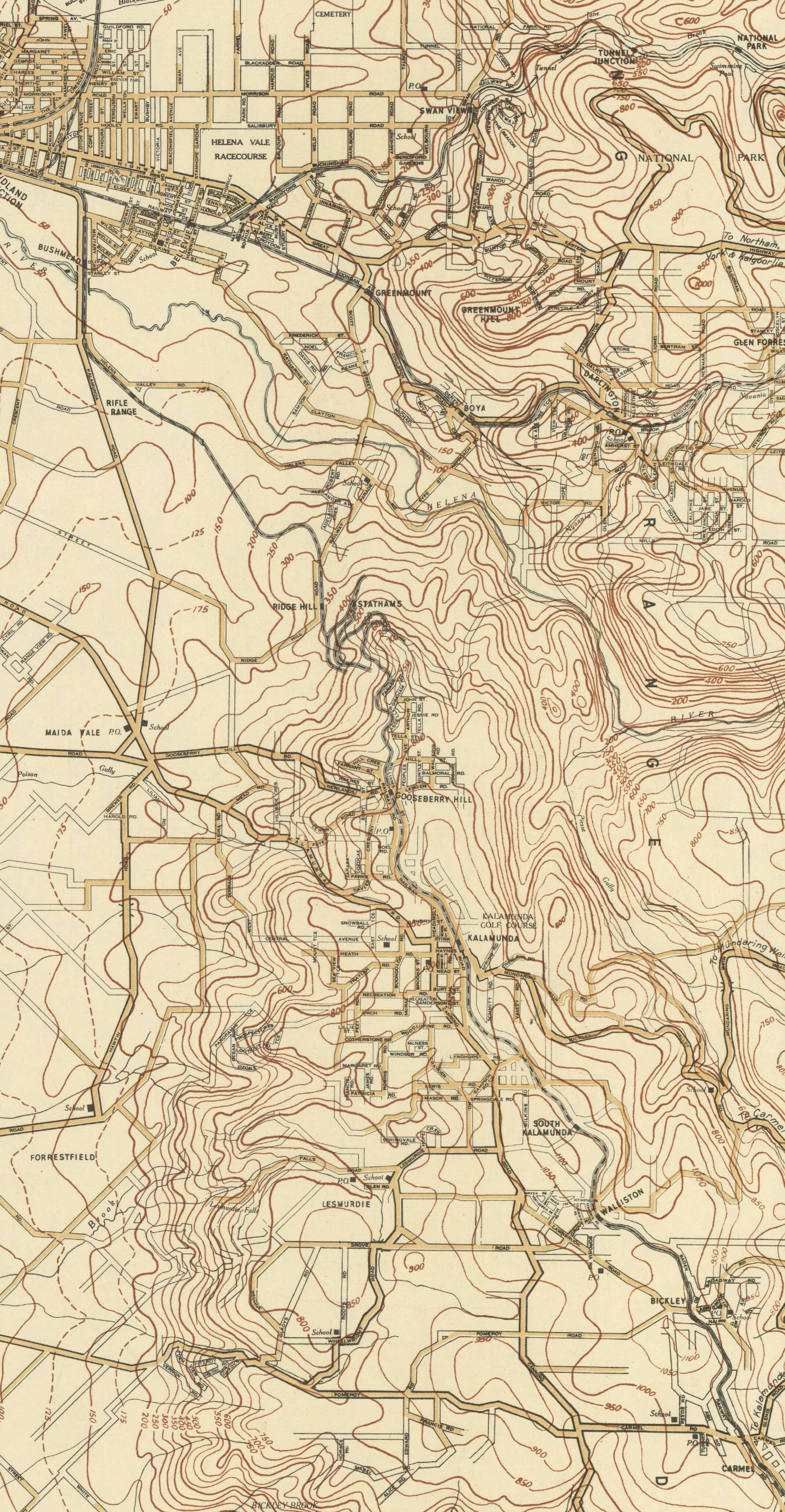
Stations on the Upper Darling Range and Mundaring lines in 1945

Closed to traffic in July 1949, due to the 1949 Australian coal strike

- Midland
- Bushmead
- Rifle Range
- Ridge Hill (at or near 31°56′16″S 116°02′37″E)
- Gooseberry Hill (at or near 31°57′22″S 116°03′06″E)
- Kalamunda
- South Kalamunda
- Walliston
- Bickley (at or near 31°59′51″S 116°04′33″E)
- Carmel (at or near 32°00′27″S 116°05′13″E)
- Turner's Siding
- Pickering Brook
- Canning Mills (at or near 32°04′05″S 116°06′17″E)
- Karragullen (at or near 32°05′10″S 116°06′57″E)

=== 1950–1966 ===
==== Mundaring Weir line ====
- Mundaring
- Wonyil, closed 14 November 1952
- O'Connor (originally No 2 Pumping Station), opened 1922, closed 14 November 1952
- Portagabra, opened 1936, closed 14 November 1952
- Karda Mordo, opened 1919, closed 14 November 1952
- Mundaring Weir, opened 1910, closed 14 November 1952

==== Bayswater–Belmont spur of the Midland line ====
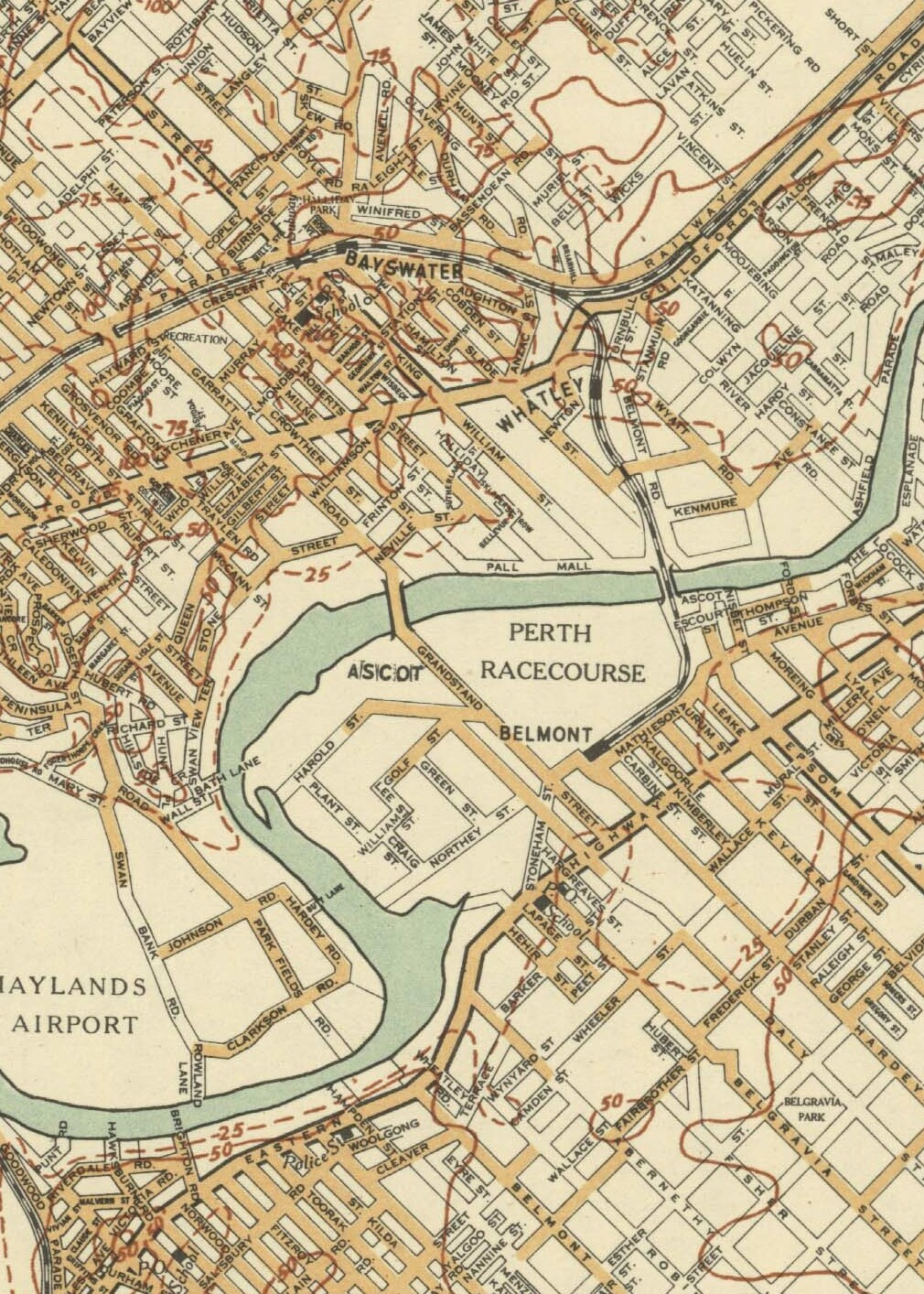
Belmont line and surrounds in 1945

Closed in January 1957 after fire damaged the rail bridge over the Swan River

- Whatley, Bayswater, terminus of the Belmont spur from 1885 to 1897 until construction of the Belmont Bridge.
- Belmont, terminus of the Belmont spur line from 1897

==== Eastern Railway first route (Mundaring loop) ====
Traffic ceased on the Mundaring loop between Bellevue and Mount Helena in 1954 before it was officially closed by parliament in 1966.

- Midland
- Koongamia 1962 - 1966
- Greenmount, stayed open for Mountain Quarry, Boya until 1 January 1966
- Boya
- Darlington
- Glen Forrest
- Nyaania
- Mahogany Creek
- Zamia
- Mundaring
- Sawyers Valley
- Mount Helena
- Chidlow (also used by Second Route)

==== South Western Railway ====
- Canning Park Racecourse was closed in 1952; from then on, access was via a siding from Maddington. Later, it was truncated to a 100 m siding for the loading of blue metal from Swan Quarry, in Orange Grove. Closed and removed by 1975.

==== Eastern Railway second route ====
The second route closed on 13 February 1966.

- Midland Junction
- Bellevue
- Swan View
- National Park
- Hovea
- Parkerville
- Stoneville
- Mount Helena (also used by First Route)
- Chidlow

=== 1966–2000 ===
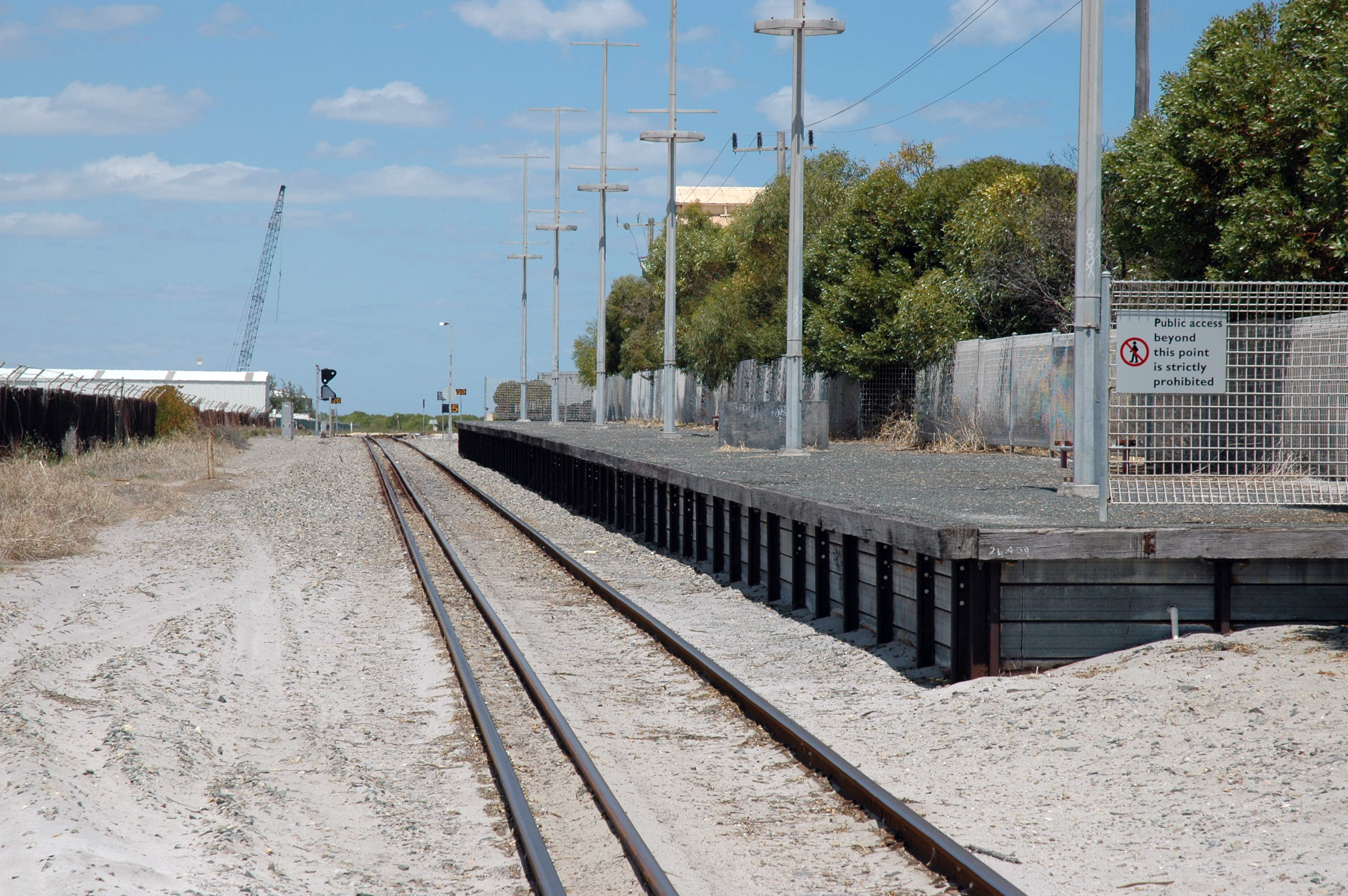
South Beach station

During this period, a number of stations were closed on the 1906-era line to Robbs Jetty and Spearwood line.

The 1987 America's Cup defence had seen the construction of railway stations established to transport people during the event.

  - Esplanade, demolished in 2018.
  - Success Harbour, demolished in 2018.
  - South Beach
- Spearwood
- Leighton, opened November 1922, closed 28 July 1991. This station closed when the North Fremantle station was relocated further north of its original position. It was named after Leighton's Crossing, which was named for Mrs Ann Leighton, the crossing gatekeeper in the late 1880s.
- Stokely was situated on the South Western Railway between Maddington and Gosnells at the Albany Highway crossing. Opened 1954, closed 15 April 1989.
- Tredale was situated on the South Western Railway 800 metres south of Armadale railway station, opened in 1956 as Armadale School siding, renamed Tredale in 1959, closed in 1989.
- West Perth on the east side of the West Perth Subway, which served the Perth Metropolitan Markets, was closed. A new station, on the west side of the subway, was opened on 18 June 1986 as West Perth. Its name was changed to City West on 19 November 1987.

=== 2000–present ===
- Lathlain, Armadale Line, closed 3 February 2003
- Belmont Park (ABP), Armadale Line, closed 13 October 2013
- Welshpool (AWL), Armadale Line, closed 20 November 2023.

== See also ==
- Closed railway stations in Western Australia, for non-Perth closures

== Resources ==
- A useful map drawn by J. Austin showing all rail services intact as of 1949 is found in Finlayson, Don (1986) Steam around PerthARHS Western Australia page 48. The list of closures is in table form on pages 49 and 50.
- Higham, G.J. 'Where WAS that? : an historical gazetteer of Western Australia' Winthrop, W.A. : Geoproject Solutions Pty Ltd, 2006. 2nd ed. ISBN 0-9758024-0-2
- Watson, Lindsay The Railway History Of Midland Junction : Commemorating The Centenary Of Midland Junction, 1895–1995 Swan View, W.A : L & S Drafting in association with the Shire of Swan and the Western Australian Light Railway Preservation Association, [1995]
- Watson, Lindsay.Midland Junction Railway Station Western rails, Vol 9, no.4(July 1987), p. 10–12
- Verney, Terry 'Thru Midland' The WESTLAND issue 218, March 2003 p. 4
- Ellis, J. A.; Hood, S. J. (1941). Railway Map of Western Australia (Map). Archived from the original on 11 November 2020.
