= Claremont, Western Australia =

Claremont
- Suburb
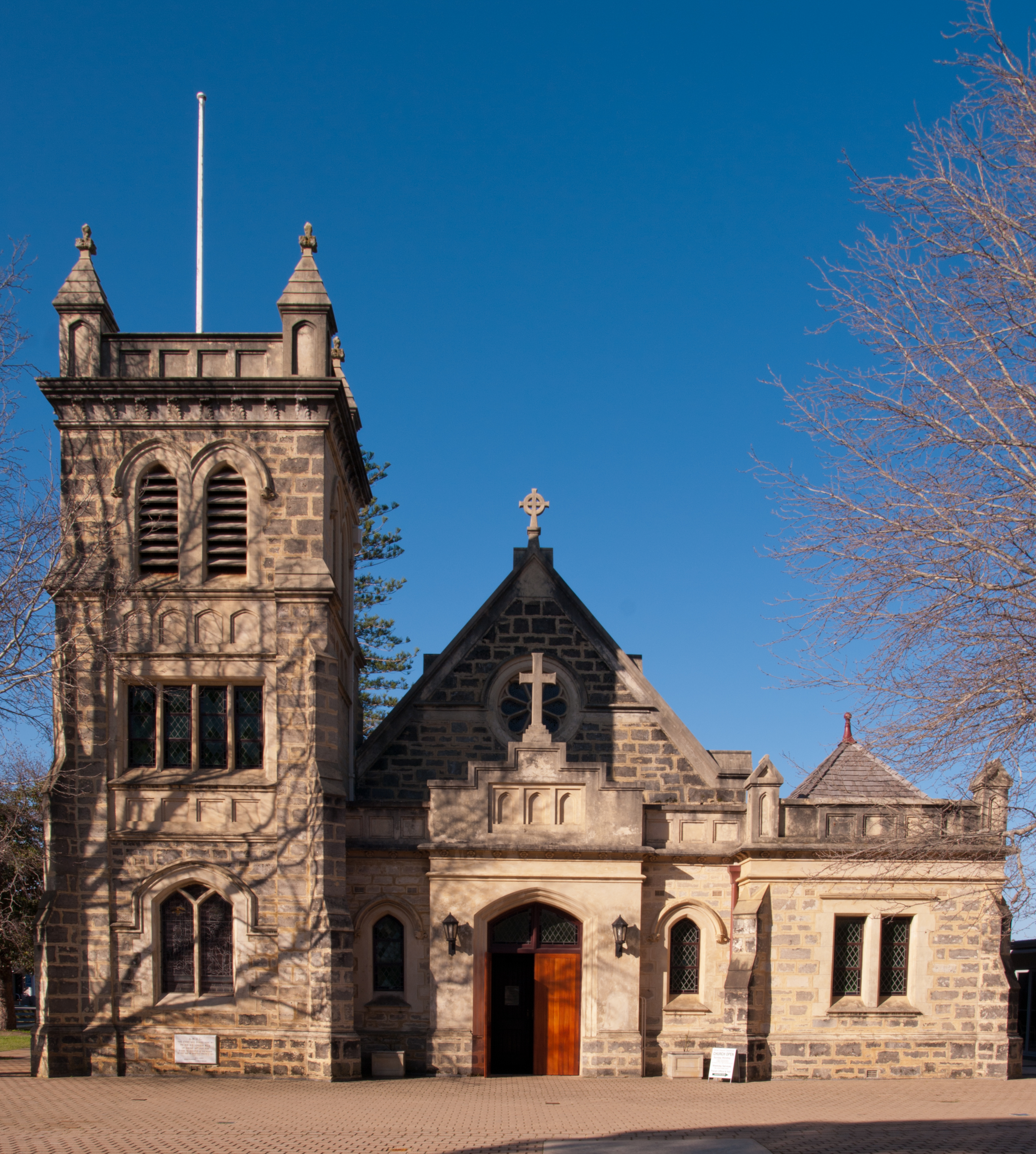
- Christ Church, Claremont, built in 1892
- Interactive map of Claremont
- Coordinates: 31.98°S 115.782°E
- Country: Australia
- State: Western Australia
- City: Perth
- LGA: Town of Claremont; Town of Cottesloe; City of Nedlands
- Location: 9 km (5.6 mi) WSW of Perth CBD
- Established: 1890s

Government
  - State electorate: Cottesloe
  - Federal division: Curtin

Area
  - Total: 3.6 km^{2} (1.4 sq mi)

Population
  - Total: 9,248 (SAL 2021)
- Postcode: 6010
Suburbs around Claremont
Mount Claremont	Mount Claremont	Karrakatta
Swanbourne	Claremont	Nedlands
Cottesloe	Peppermint Grove	Dalkeith

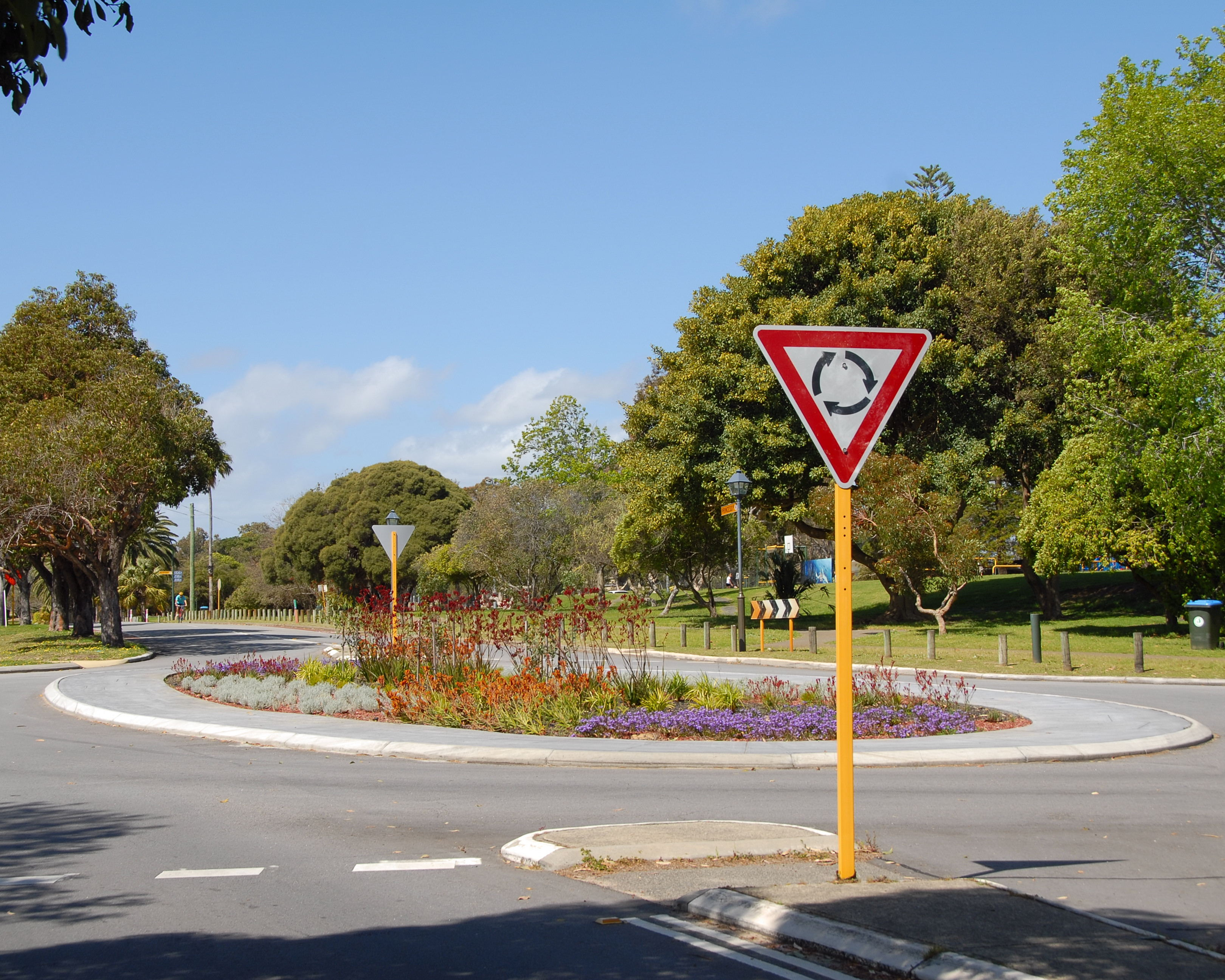
Princess Road, Claremont

Claremont is a western suburb of Perth, Western Australia, on the north bank of the Swan River.

== History ==
Prior to European settlement, the Noongar people used the area as a source of water, for fishing and for catching waterfowl.

In 1830, John Butler, a settler, set up an inn at Freshwater Bay (in modern-day Peppermint Grove) to attract travellers on the road from Perth to Fremantle. A wetland became known as Butler's Swamp (later Lake Claremont). After the arrival of convicts in the colony in 1850, work began on constructing the Fremantle Road. The government allocated land on the foreshore and at Butler's Swamp to 19 Pensioner Guards and their families, and a permanent convict depot operated at Freshwater Bay (until 1875).

A state school and church were built in 1862, and a community gradually developed around what is now Victoria Avenue. A settler named James Morrison acquired property at Swan Location 702 and named it Claremont Estate after his wife, Clara (née de Burgh). During the 1870s, several prominent families, including the Triggs, Sandovers, and Stirlings, acquired land in the district near the future site of Christ Church Grammar School, with some of their homes later purchased and used by the school.

In 1881, the railway line from Perth to Fremantle was built, along with a station at Butler's Swamp; the name of the station was changed to Claremont in 1883. The focus of the community shifted to the area between the railway line, Fremantle Road (Stirling Highway) and Bay View Terrace. The Freshwater Bay school ceased to play a central role; it became a boarding house nicknamed "’Appy ‘Ome" in 1892 (and in 1975 a museum).

Land speculators purchased property in the area and subdivided blocks into varying sizes, resulting in a wide class diversity within the suburb. By around 1903, the entire suburb—except for a dozen or so streets—had been subdivided, and by the Second World War, the community was firmly established.

== Geography ==
Claremont is bounded by Airlie Street to the south; Stirling Highway, Parry Street and Stirling Road to the west; Alfred Road to the north and Loch Street and Bay Road to the east. A large part of Claremont is residential, although a significant shopping area is located along Stirling Highway, and the Claremont Showground and the eastern half of Lake Claremont are within Claremont's boundaries.

Claremont has grand homes in the Agett Road and Richardson Avenue areas on the south side of Stirling Highway.

== Population ==
At the 2016 census, Claremont had a population of 8,148 people. 61.1% of people were born in Australia. The next most common countries of birth were England 8.5%, South Africa 1.9%, China 1.9% and New Zealand 1.7%. 78.3% of people spoke only English at home. Other languages spoken at home included Mandarin at 2.1%. The most common responses for religion were No Religion 32.2%, Anglican 21.3% and Catholic 19.1%.

Of the employed people in Claremont, 6.4% worked in hospitals (excluding psychiatric hospitals). Other major industries of employment included higher education (4.0%), combined primary and secondary education (3.9%), legal services (3.5%), and cafes and restaurants (3.3%).

Of occupied private dwellings in Claremont 46.5% were separate houses, 25.3% were semi-detached and 27.5% were flats or apartments.

== Facilities ==
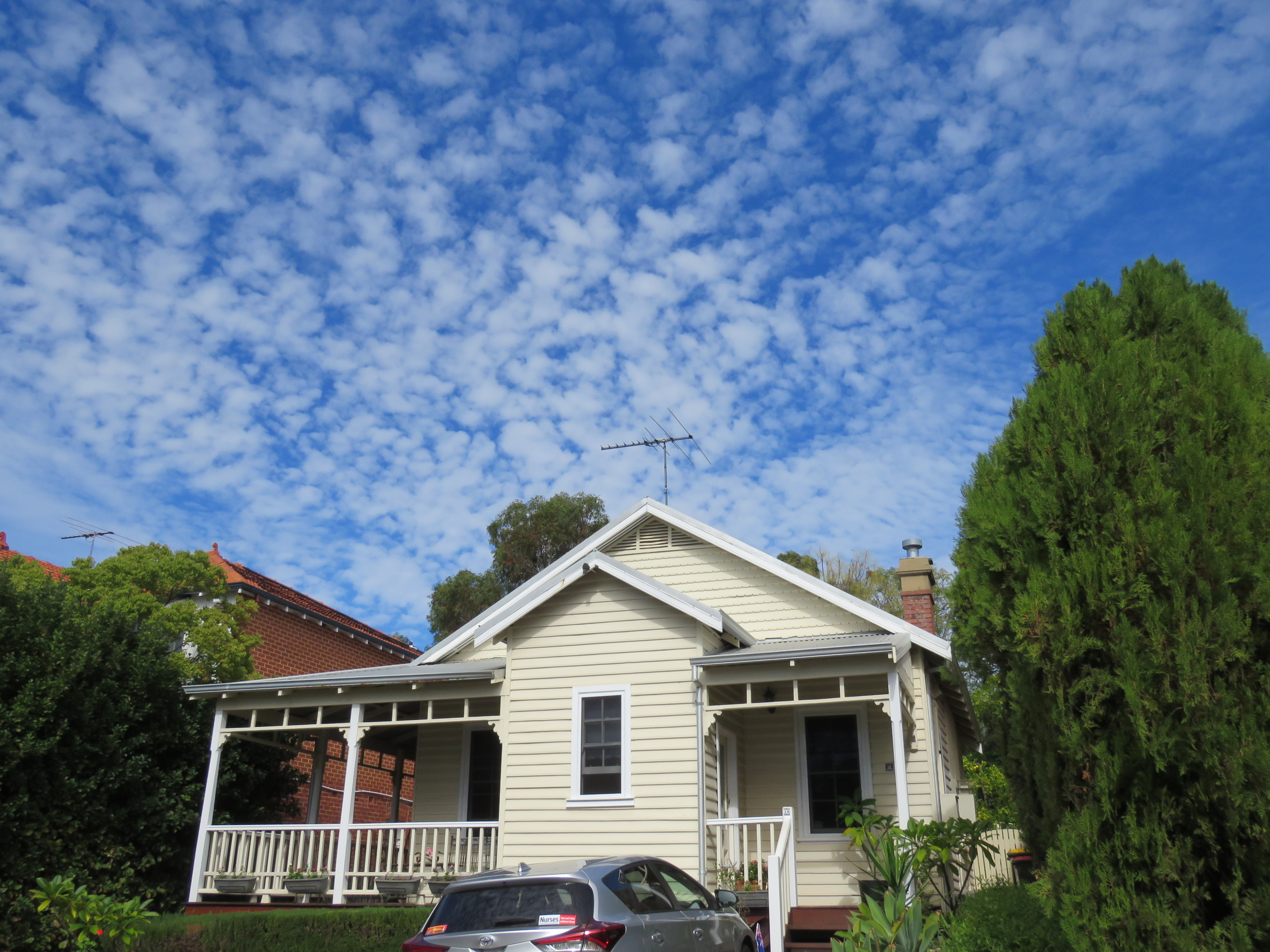
Anzac Cottage is listed on the State Register of Heritage Places

Claremont includes the Claremont Showground and the Claremont Oval, home ground of the Claremont Football Club, as well as a significant shopping area along Stirling Highway, most concentrated on the St Quentins Avenue precinct.

Several private schools including Methodist Ladies' College, Christ Church Grammar School, Presbyterian Ladies' College, John XXIII College and Scotch College are either in Claremont or within 50 metres (160 ft) of the suburb boundary. Claremont also contains a small private hospital (Bethesda) and one state primary school; Freshwater Bay Primary School (formed by the amalgamation of Claremont Primary School and East Claremont Primary School), as well as a number of jetties on the Swan River.

The Perth Royal Show, an annual agricultural show, is held at the Claremont Showground. The showground also hosts several large events and music festivals throughout the year.

The suburb contains a number of heritage-listed sites, including the Claremont Post Office and the weatherboard Anzac Cottage.

The Claremont Quarter shopping centre opened in 2009.

== Transport ==
Claremont is served by the Claremont railway station and Loch Street railway station at regular times, as well as the Showgrounds railway station during special events. Various buses, including the CircleRoute, travel along Stirling Highway and through Claremont's northern and southern sections. All services are operated by Transperth.

=== Bus ===
- 23 Claremont station to Elizabeth Quay bus station – serves Leura Avenue, Bay View Terrace and Victoria Avenue
- 24 Claremont station to Point Fraser – serves Leura Avenue, Bay View Terrace and Victoria Avenue
- 25 Claremont Station to Shenton Park station – serves Leura Avenue, Bay View Terrace and Princess Road
- 27 Claremont station to East Perth – serves Stirling Road and Alfred Road
- 28 Claremont station to Perth Busport – serves Stirling Road, Shenton Road, Davies Road and Alfred Road
- 102 Claremont station to Cottesloe station – serves Stirling Road
- 103 Claremont station to Elizabeth Quay bus station – serves Leura Avenue and Stirling Highway
- 107 Claremont station to Fremantle station – serves Stirling Road and Stirling Highway
- 995 Claremont station to Elizabeth Quay bus station (high frequency) – serves Leura Avenue and Stirling Highway
- 998 Fremantle station to Fremantle station (limited stops) – CircleRoute clockwise, serves Stirling Highway, Stirling Road, Claremont Station and Leura Avenue
- 999 Fremantle station to Fremantle station (limited stops) – CircleRoute anti-clockwise, serves Stirling Highway, Leura Avenue, Claremont station and Stirling Road

=== Rail ===
- Fremantle/Airport Line
  - Loch Street station
  - Showgrounds station (special events only)
  - Claremont station
- Fremantle Line only
  - Swanbourne station

== Politics ==
Claremont is part of the federal division of Curtin. The federal seat is held by the independent Kate Chaney. It was typically regarded as a safe seat for the Liberal Party until the most recent election, as it had been continually retained by the Liberal Party with the exception of former Liberal member Allan Rocher as an independent politician between 1996 and 1998 and the current member Kate Chaney. For the parliament of Western Australia, Claremont is divided between the state electoral districts of Cottesloe and Nedlands, both held by the Liberal Party. The current mayor of Claremont is Jock Barker.

== Notable residents ==
- Jessie Forsyth (1847/49 – 1937), temperance advocate
- Kimberley Michael (Kim) Durack (1917–1968), agricultural scientist
- Adelaide Kane (born 1990) actress
- Sheila Mary McClemans (1909–1988), barrister and naval officer
- Donald Alexander Stockdrill (1923–1980), civil engineer
- Colin Syme (1903–1986), businessman
- Gwyn White (née Shirley) (1913–2020), first female umpire for the Davis Cup

== See also ==
- Claremont serial killings
- Town of Claremont
