= Fremantle Railway Workshops =

Former railway workshops in Fremantle, Western Australia

Fremantle Railway Workshops were the main workshops for the Western Australian Government Railways from 1886 until 1904 when the workshops were moved to Midland Junction where the Midland Railway Workshops operated until 1994.

== History ==
The workshops were created in 1886, and expanded in 1896.

Industrial unrest at the workshops was common.

The proximity of the Fremantle Harbour and the Fremantle town was a convenience for the workers and also the community businesses. By accounts from the era, local pride in having the workshops was strong, and in most cases the workers lived locally.

The Fremantle workshops were located west of the Fremantle railway station and were considered to be in an area that would not accommodate the needs of the railway system.

The move in 1904 was a major change for the labour force, and some did not move to Midland for the new location.

== Sources ==
- "Men of the Railway Workshops, Fremantle, c. 1904". Trove. Fremantle City Library Local History Collection. 15 May 2012. Archived from the original on 14 May 2012 – via National Library of Australia.
