= The Esplanade railway station =

Former railway station in Fremantle

The Esplanade
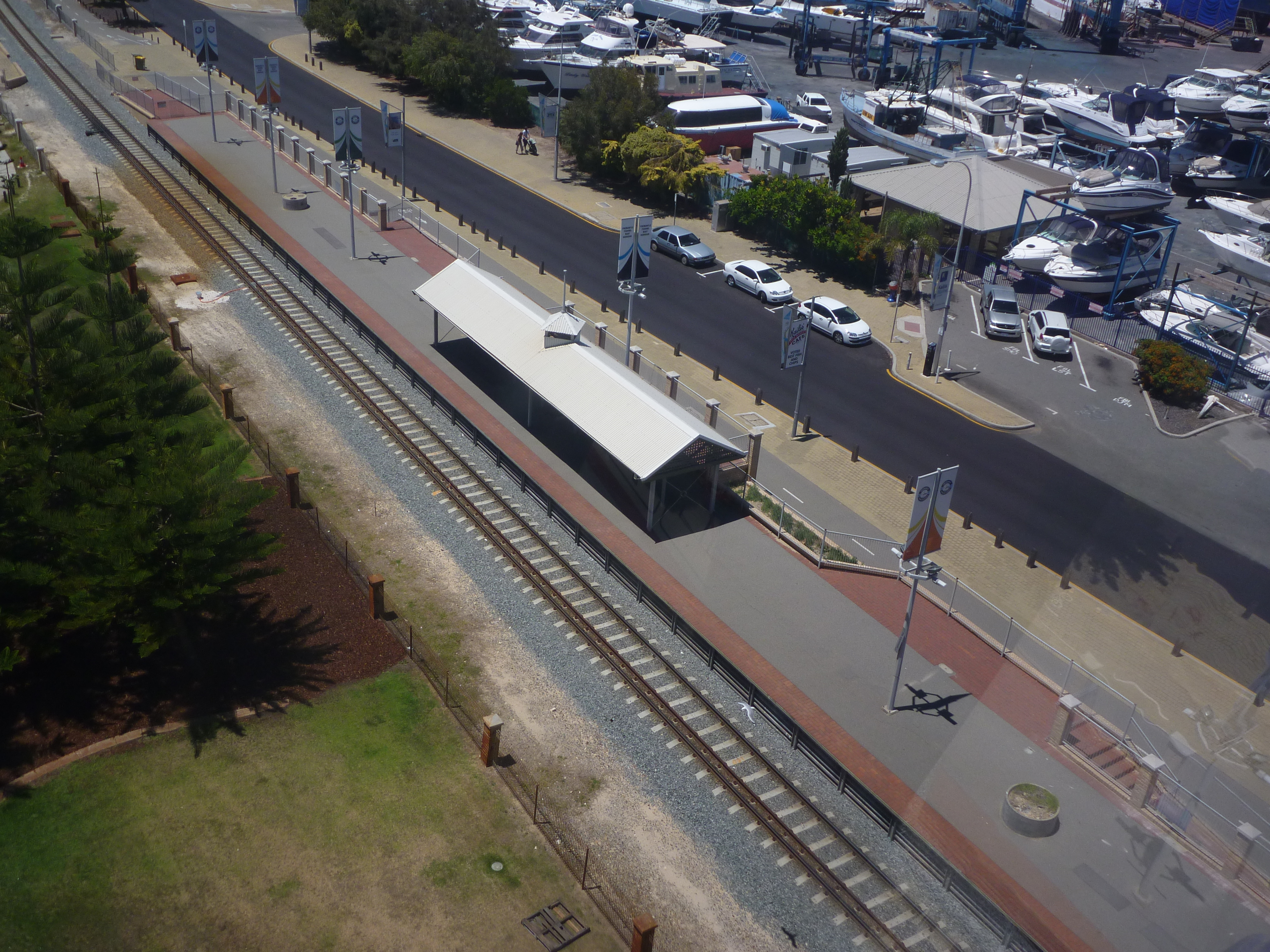
- Station in 2011, viewed from ferris wheel in Esplanade Park

General information
- Location: Mews Road, Fremantle; Australia
- Coordinates: 32°03′32″S 115°44′43″E
- Owner: Public Transport Authority
- Operator: Transperth
- Line: Fremantle
- Distance: 19.8 km (12.3 mi) from Perth railway station
- Platforms: 1
- Tracks: 1

Construction
- Structure type: Ground

History
- Opened: 1986
- Closed: 1987

Services
Preceding station	Transperth	Following station
Fremantle towards Perth	Fremantle line	Success Harbour towards South Beach
Location

The Esplanade railway station was a railway station on the Transperth network. It was located on the Fremantle line, 19.8 kilometres (12.3 mi) from Perth station between Bathers Beach and Esplanade Park.

== History ==
On 22 October 1898, the Fremantle line was extended south from Fremantle to Robbs Jetty.

For the staging of the 1987 America's Cup, the existing narrow and standard gauge tracks were combined as one dual gauge line with three temporary stations erected, one of which was this station. Between October 1986 and February 1987, the Hotham Valley Railway operated a daily service on this section of the line with a W class steam locomotive as the Spinnaker Run. This was supplemented by Transperth special services.

Having not been used since, the station was demolished in September 2018.
