= Grant Street railway station =

Railway station in Perth, Western Australia

Grant Street
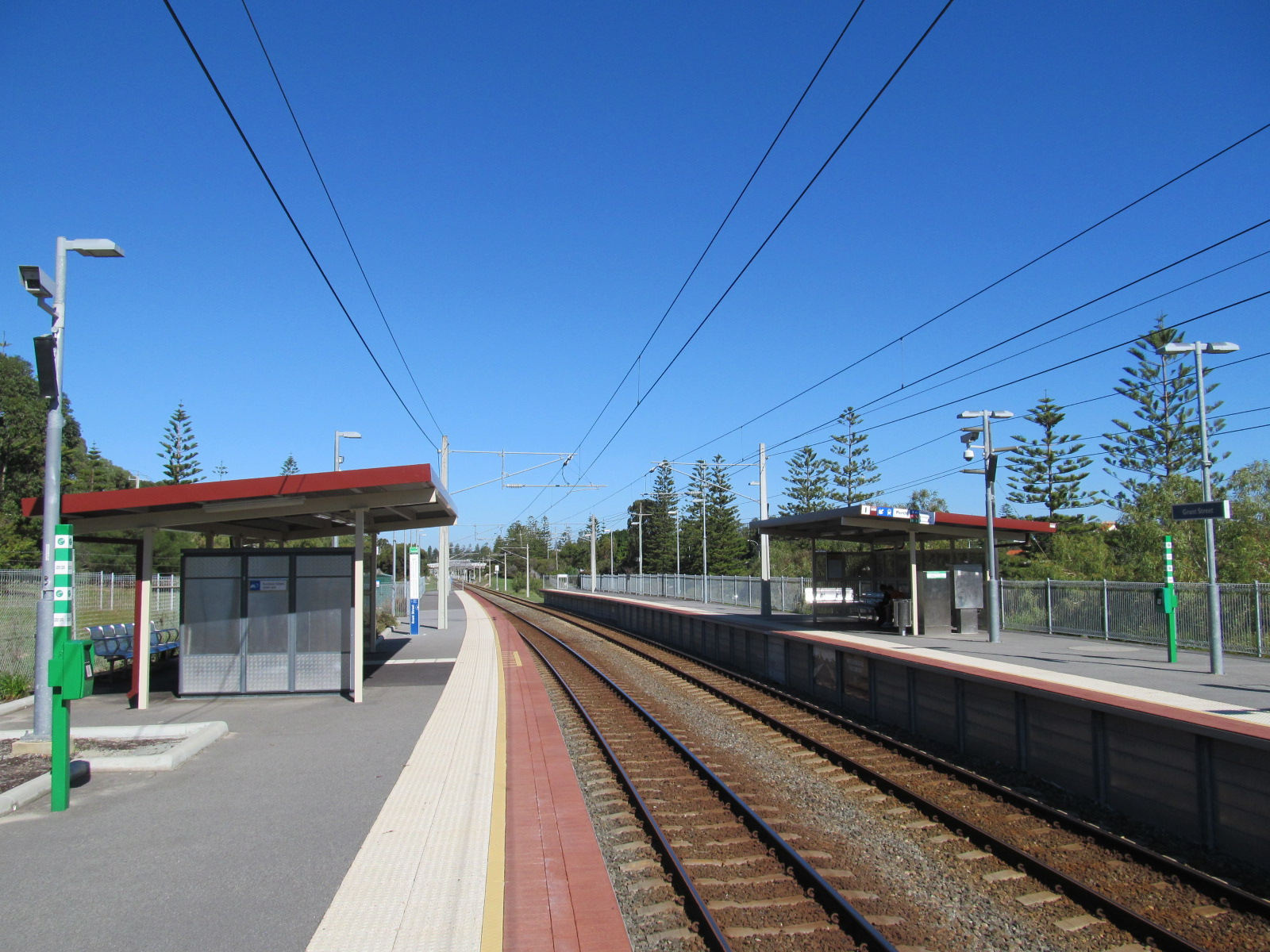
- Northbound view from Platform 1, May 2012

General information
- Location: Curtin Avenue, Cottesloe; Australia
- Coordinates: 31°59′12″S 115°45′54″E
- Owner: Public Transport Authority
- Operator: Transperth Train Operations
- Line: Fremantle line
- Distance: 11.1 kilometres (6.9 mi) from Perth
- Platforms: 2 side
- Tracks: 2

Construction
- Structure type: Ground

Other information
- Station code: FGS; 99301 (platform 1); 99302 (platform 2)
- Fare zone: 2

History
- Opened: 1954

Passengers
- 2013–14: 85,036

Services
Preceding station	Transperth	Following station
Swanbourne towards Perth	Fremantle line	Cottesloe towards Fremantle
Location
- Location of Grant Street railway station

Grant Street railway station is a railway station on the Transperth network. It is located on the Fremantle line, 11.1 kilometres from Perth station serving the suburb of Cottesloe.

== History ==
Grant Street station opened in 1954. The station closed on 1 September 1979 along with the rest of the Fremantle line, re-opening on 29 July 1983 when services were restored.

Following the introduction of four-carriage trains on 18 August 2002, services could not stop at Grant Street due to the platform lengths with alternative road transport provided. In May 2009, work was completed at the station to extend the platforms, and four-carriage trains now stop at the station.

From 2034, Grant Street station's platforms are planned to be extended to the south to accommodate six-car trains.

== Services ==
Grant Street station is served by Transperth Fremantle line services from Fremantle to Perth that continue through to Midland via the Midland line.

Grant Street station saw 85,036 passengers in the 2013–14 financial year.

== Platforms ==
Grant Street has two platforms: platform 1 has Perth-bound trains; platform 2 has Fremantle-bound trains.

Grant Street platform arrangement
Stop ID	Platform	Line	Service Pattern	Destination	Via	Notes
99301	1	Fremantle line	All stations	Perth		
99302	2	Fremantle line	All stations	Fremantle		
