= Albion Hotel, Cottesloe =

Hotel in Cottesloe, Western Australia

Coordinates: 31°59′51″S 115°45′46.3″E

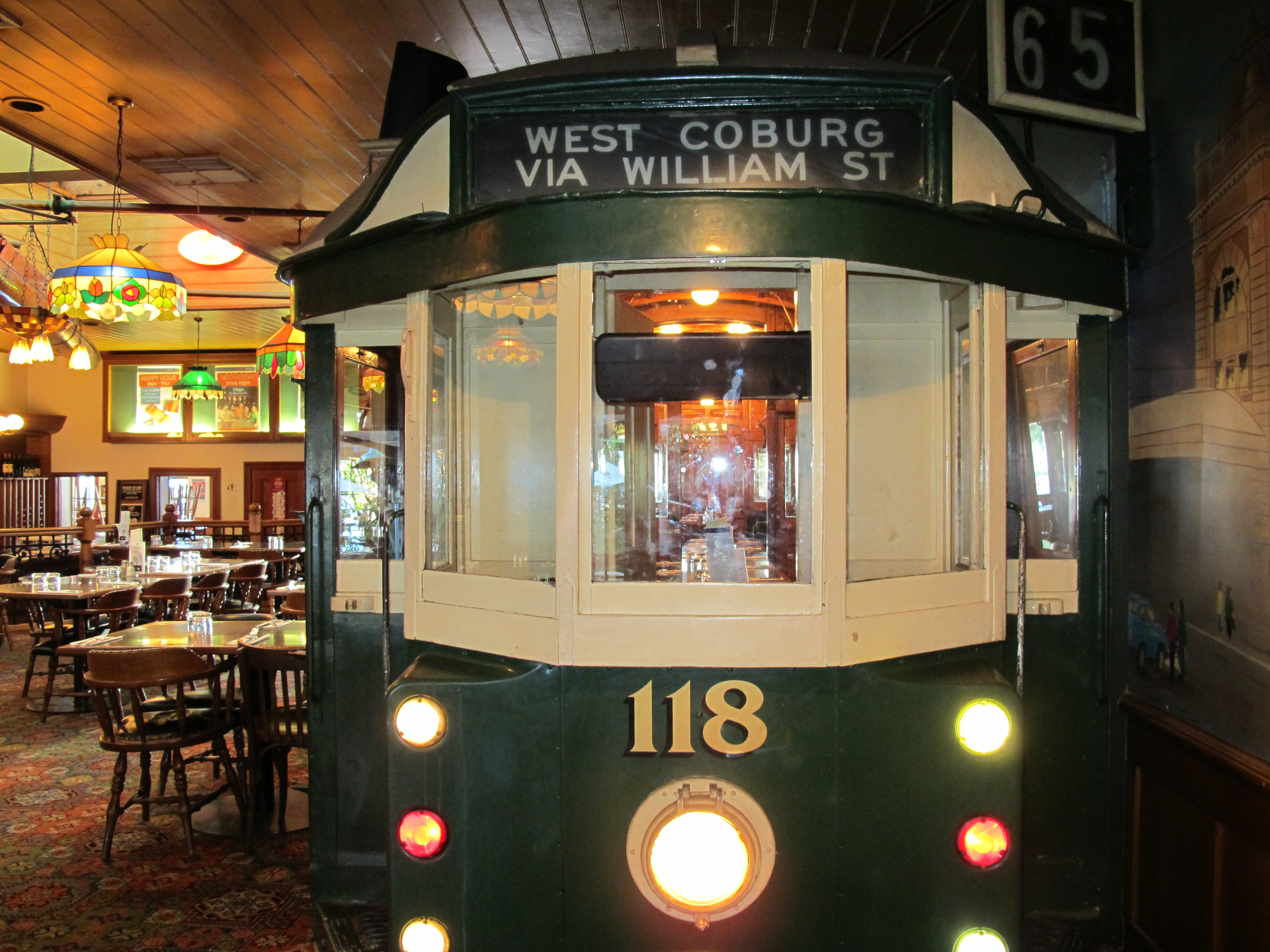
Albion tram

The Albion Hotel on Stirling Highway in Cottesloe, Western Australia is a historical building, trading as a hotel since 1870.

In its early years it was known as Halfway House - being located midway between Fremantle and Perth. The site was established by Thomas Briggs before 1869. The current hotel has traded under various names for over a century as a public house.

== Early history ==
In 1864 Thomas Ernest Briggs paid £10, equivalent to A$1,523 in 2022, for "Swan Location 349". It is unclear whether Briggs erected a new building or made amendments to an existing structure on the site, although many convict-era colonist writings make reference to building on the Albion site in the mid to late 1860s. Records show that Briggs applied for a publican licence in 1870 and the original inn was called Halfway House. Briggs sold the property to Robert Napoleon Bullen in 1882. Robert's name is now immortalised in the popular cafe strip Napoleon Street. Bullen had grand plans to create the Albion Pleasure Grounds but he died before his plans were realised.

In 1907 the hotel was up for tender for purchase from Alice Bullen.

In 1912 the licence was changed from Norman Ferres to Frederick Treadgold.

Alex Cooper became licensee in 1924 and operated the hotel until 1941.

The pub safe was stolen in June 1929. In 1930, men were charged with using an adjacent vacant block as a betting place.

== Fire ==
In 2016, a fire in the roof-space caused A$10,000 worth of damage, but the building was saved from destruction.

== Aerial photographs ==
- Aerial Surveys Australia; HRRC (1964), Aerial photograph of the Albion Hotel, Cottesloe, 30 Oct. 1964 [picture]
- Aerial Surveys Australia; HRRC (1965), Aerial photograph of the Albion Hotel, Cottesloe, 8 Feb. 1965 [picture]
- Aerial Surveys Australia; HRRC (1969), Aerial photograph of the Grove Shopping Centre and the Albion Hotel, Cottesloe, 26 Nov. 1969 [picture]
