= Swanbourne railway station, Perth =

Railway station in Perth, Western Australia

Swanbourne
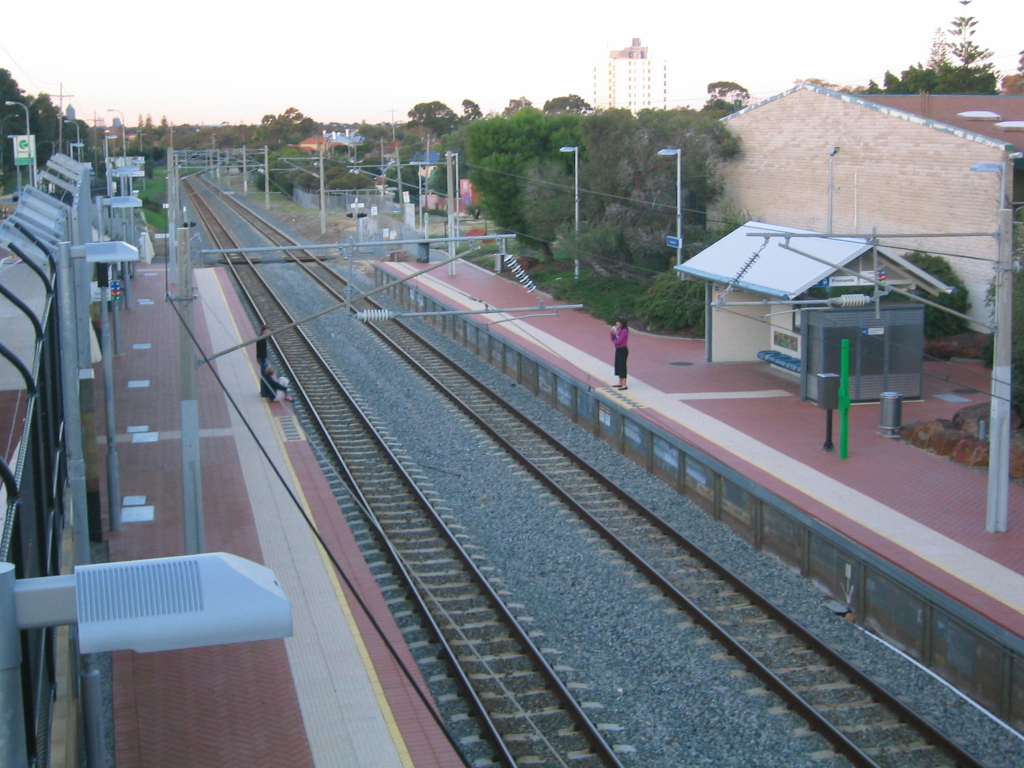
- Eastbound view of the station platforms, July 2005

General information
- Location: Claremont Crescent, Swanbourne; Australia
- Coordinates: 31°58′58″S 115°46′14″E
- Owner: Public Transport Authority
- Operator: Transperth
- Line: Fremantle line
- Distance: 10.4 kilometres (6.5 mi) from Perth
- Platforms: 2 side
- Tracks: 2

Construction
- Structure type: Ground

Other information
- Station code: FSE; 99291 (platform 1); 99292 (platform 2)
- Fare zone: 2

History
- Opened: 1 March 1904
- Former names: Osborne; Congdon Street

Passengers
- 2013-14: 105,274

Services
Preceding station	Transperth	Following station
Claremont towards Perth	Fremantle line	Grant Street towards Fremantle
Location
- Location of Swanbourne railway station

Swanbourne railway station is a railway station on the Transperth network. It is located on the Fremantle line, 10.4 kilometres from Perth station serving the suburbs of Swanbourne, Claremont and Cottesloe.

== History ==
Swanbourne station opened on 1 March 1904 as Congdon Street. It was renamed Osborne in 1912 (with 'West Claremont' also being considered at this time) before finally being renamed Swanbourne in 1921. The last change was at the request of the Commissioner of Railways to eliminate confusion with Osborne Park in the city's north-west.

The station closed on 1 September 1979 along with the rest of the Fremantle line, re-opening on 29 July 1983 when services were restored.

From 2034, Swanbourne station's platforms are planned to be extended to the east to accommodate six-car trains.

== Services ==
Swanbourne station is served by Transperth Fremantle line services from Fremantle to Perth that continue through to Midland via the Midland line.

Swanbourne station saw 105,274 passengers in the 2013–14 financial year.

== Platforms ==
Swanbourne platform arrangement
Stop ID	Platform	Line	Service Pattern	Destination	Via	Notes
99291	1	Fremantle line	All stations	Perth		
99292	2	Fremantle line	All stations	Fremantle		

== Bus routes ==
Stop	Route	Destination / description	Notes
Claremont Crescent (east bound)	906	Rail replacement service to Perth station	
Claremont Crescent (west bound)	906	Rail replacement service to Fremantle station	
