= Swanbourne, Western Australia =

Swanbourne
- Suburb
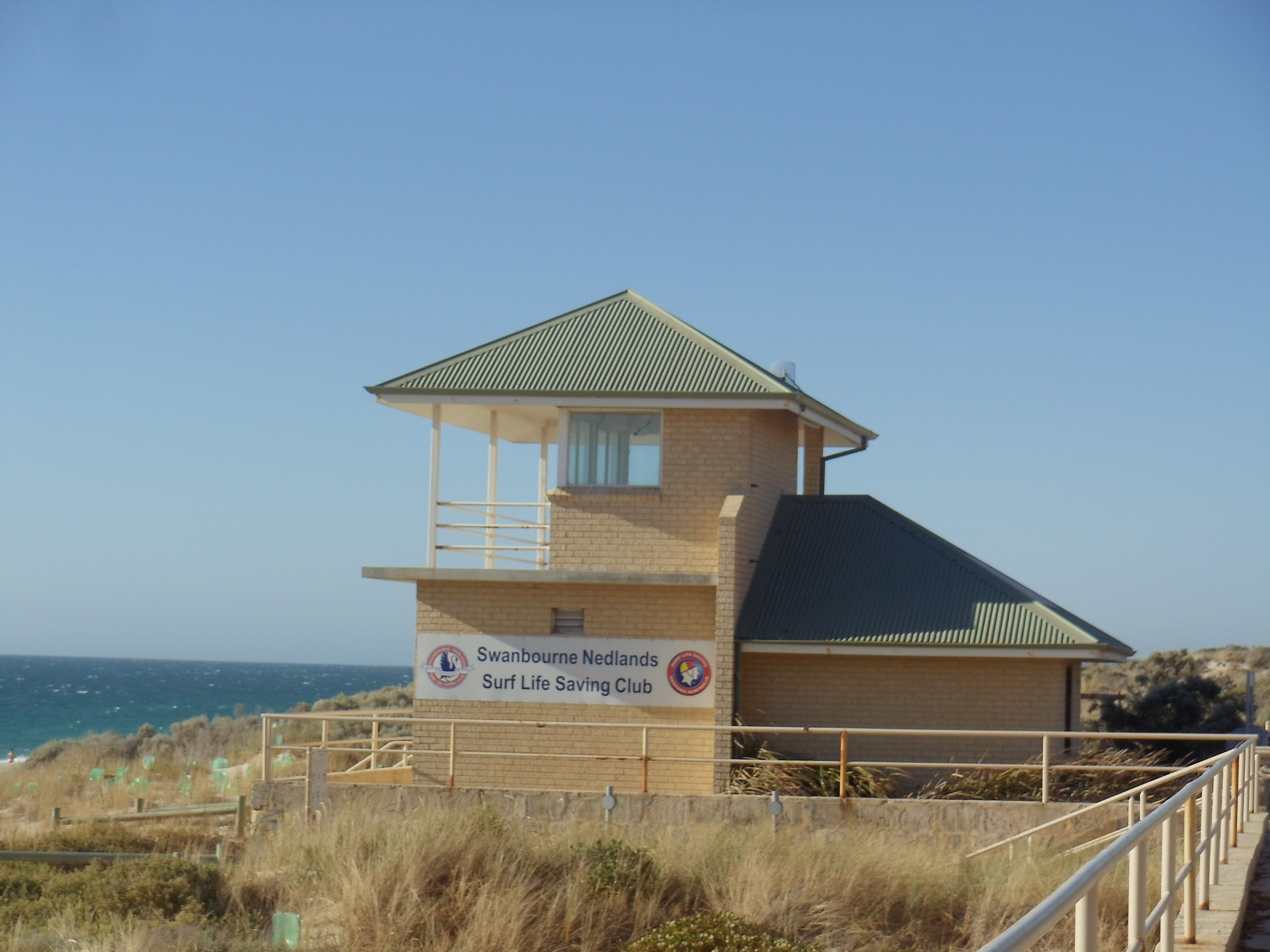
- Swanbourne Nedlands Surf Life Saving Club building
- Interactive map of Swanbourne
- Coordinates: 31.969°S 115.767°E
- Country: Australia
- State: Western Australia
- City: Perth
- LGA: City of Nedlands
- Location: 11 km (6.8 mi) W of the Perth CBD
- Established: 1892

Government
  - State electorate: Cottesloe
  - Federal division: Curtin

Area
  - Total: 3.6 km^{2} (1.4 sq mi)

Population
  - Total: 4,592 (SAL 2021)
- Postcode: 6010
Suburbs around Swanbourne
City Beach	Mount Claremont	Mount Claremont
Indian Ocean	Swanbourne	Claremont
Cottesloe	Claremont	Claremont

Swanbourne is a western coastal suburb of Perth, Western Australia, located within the City of Nedlands. It is an affluent, upper middle class residential area with older Federation style homes, many being renovated. The suburb was established in the late 19th century. New housing estates have been built recently through the redevelopment of areas such as the Swanbourne Senior High School, Swanbourne Primary School and Lakeway Drive-In Cinema sites.

== History ==
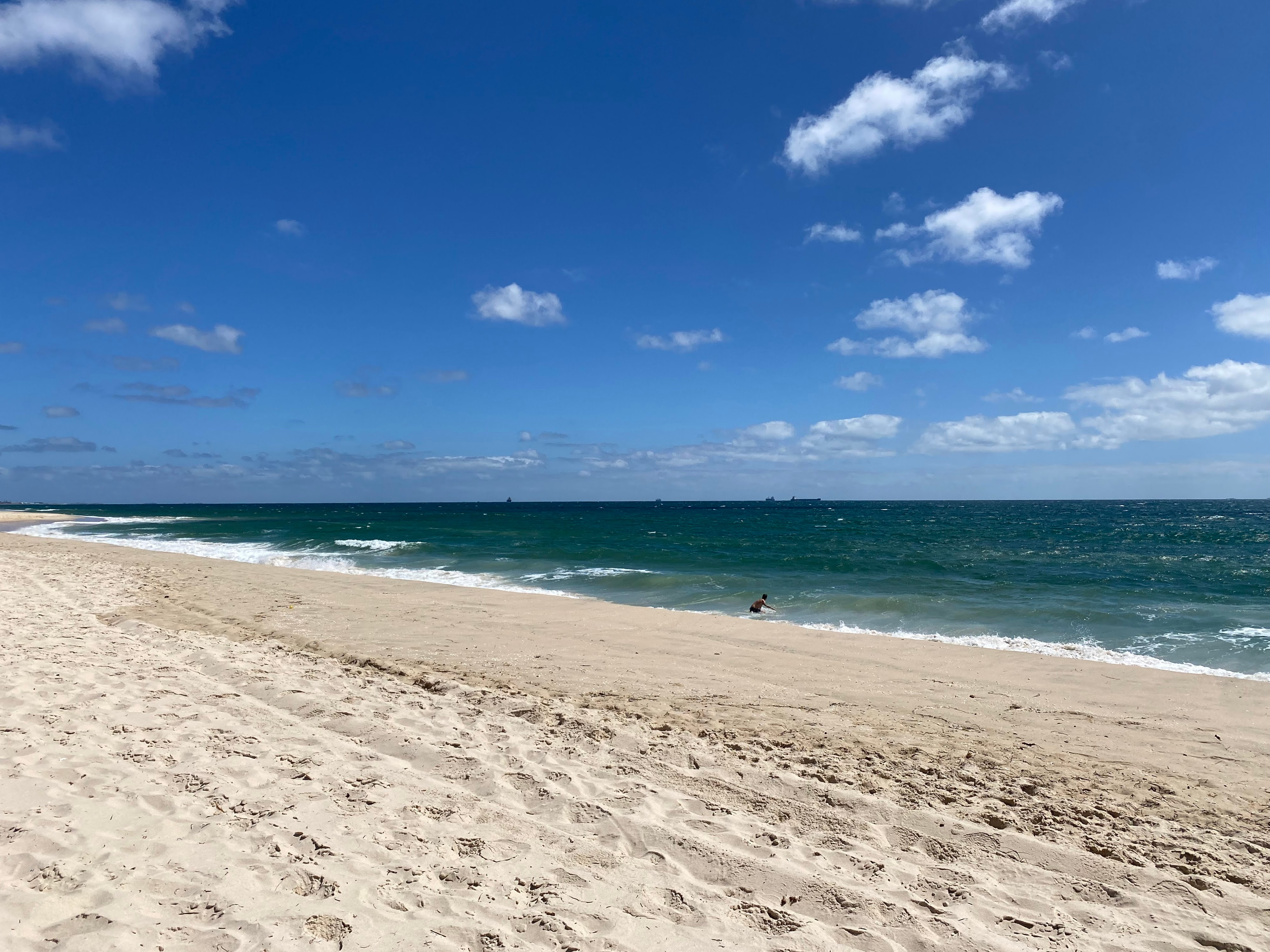
Swanbourne Beach

Swanbourne was initially called Osborne, and was renamed in 1921. The renaming was done in order for the suburb to not be confused with Osborne Park, another suburb in Perth, and after an individual died following an ambulance being sent to the wrong location.

Swanbourne was named for Swanbourne House, in Swanbourne, Buckinghamshire, the family seat of Thomas Fremantle, a prominent Conservative politician, and his brother, Charles Fremantle, for whom the city of Fremantle was named.

== Geography and population ==
Swanbourne is bounded by the Swanbourne Rifle Range and Cottesloe Golf Club to the north, Lake Claremont and Stirling Road to the east, the Fremantle railway line and North Street to the south, and the Indian Ocean to the west.

At the 2016 Australian census, Swanbourne had a population of 4,059 people. 69.6% of people were born in Australia. The next most common countries of birth was England at 7.5%. 87.0% of people spoke only English at home. The most common responses for religion were "no religion" 37.4%, Anglican 20.9% and Catholic 19.1%.

There were 1,320 occupied private dwellings in Swanbourne. 78.7% of these were separate houses and 13.0% were semi-detached. Swanbourne is a high income suburb with a median family income of $3,564, compared to $1,910 for Western Australia and $1,734 for Australia. 8.8% of employed residents worked in defence.

=== Climate ===
Swanbourne has a hot-summer Mediterranean climate (Köppen climate classification Csa), similar to the rest of the Perth metropolitan region. In contrast to Perth, it is slightly more humid and cooler in the summer, due to the sea breezes, which can be quite strong in the afternoon, with an average 3 pm wind speed of 27.7 km/h (17.2 mph).

Climate data for Swanbourne
Month	Jan	Feb	Mar	Apr	May	Jun	Jul	Aug	Sep	Oct	Nov	Dec	Year
Record high °C (°F)	44.3 (111.7)	43.0 (109.4)	42.8 (109.0)	37.3 (99.1)	31.5 (88.7)	26.2 (79.2)	25.9 (78.6)	30.2 (86.4)	34.7 (94.5)	37.1 (98.8)	41.1 (106.0)	43.7 (110.7)	44.3 (111.7)
Mean maximum °C (°F)	39.5 (103.1)	39.6 (103.3)	38.2 (100.8)	33.2 (91.8)	27.9 (82.2)	23.9 (75.0)	22.5 (72.5)	23.7 (74.7)	26.5 (79.7)	31.8 (89.2)	35.8 (96.4)	38.3 (100.9)	41.2 (106.2)
Mean daily maximum °C (°F)	29.7 (85.5)	30.4 (86.7)	28.8 (83.8)	25.3 (77.5)	22.2 (72.0)	19.5 (67.1)	18.4 (65.1)	18.9 (66.0)	19.9 (67.8)	22.3 (72.1)	25.4 (77.7)	27.9 (82.2)	24.1 (75.4)
Mean daily minimum °C (°F)	18.2 (64.8)	18.7 (65.7)	17.5 (63.5)	15.3 (59.5)	12.5 (54.5)	10.7 (51.3)	9.7 (49.5)	10.1 (50.2)	11.0 (51.8)	12.5 (54.5)	14.8 (58.6)	16.6 (61.9)	14.0 (57.2)
Mean minimum °C (°F)	12.8 (55.0)	13.4 (56.1)	11.4 (52.5)	9.8 (49.6)	7.2 (45.0)	5.7 (42.3)	4.7 (40.5)	5.2 (41.4)	5.9 (42.6)	7.3 (45.1)	9.8 (49.6)	11.4 (52.5)	4.0 (39.2)
Record low °C (°F)	9.9 (49.8)	11.0 (51.8)	7.5 (45.5)	7.5 (45.5)	4.8 (40.6)	2.9 (37.2)	2.4 (36.3)	3.1 (37.6)	3.1 (37.6)	5.0 (41.0)	7.1 (44.8)	5.7 (42.3)	2.4 (36.3)
Average rainfall mm (inches)	19.5 (0.77)	12.1 (0.48)	20.8 (0.82)	38.3 (1.51)	87.6 (3.45)	126.2 (4.97)	149.8 (5.90)	119.2 (4.69)	79.0 (3.11)	41.9 (1.65)	22.2 (0.87)	11.1 (0.44)	728.2 (28.67)
Average precipitation days	2.7	2.1	3.9	7.4	11.8	16.6	18.3	17.3	15.1	8.9	5.3	3.5	112.9
Average afternoon relative humidity (%) (at 15:00)	55	54	52	57	59	62	63	63	62	59	58	54	58
Source: Bureau of Meteorology; Temperatures and rain data: 1993–2020; Relative humidity: 1993–2010

== Facilities ==
Swanbourne includes the 18-hole Cottesloe Golf Club and Swanbourne Beach. Swanbourne is also well known for having one of the only two official nudist beaches (free beaches) in the Perth metropolitan region. The beach, situated on army land and thus not subject to local council authority, is immediately north of the officially named Swanbourne Beach. Allen Park contains a number of sporting facilities, including tennis courts, a football/cricket pitch and a rugby pitch. Also at Allen Park is the relocated Tom Collins House. Tom Collins was a noted Australian author. A veterinary practice in Devon road was originally started by Thomas William Hogarth.

Scotch College, a major independent school for boys, is the suburb's largest employer after the Army.

The Australian Special Air Service Regiment is based at Campbell Barracks within the suburb, which occupies the coastline north of Cottesloe and south of City Beach.

== Transport ==
Swanbourne is served by Swanbourne railway station and by various bus routes that pass through Swanbourne. All services are operated by the Public Transport Authority.

=== Bus ===
- 27 Claremont Station to East Perth – serves Stirling Road, Shenton Road, Servetus Street, Narla Road and Alfred Road
- 28 Claremont Station to Perth Busport – serves Stirling Road
- 102 Claremont Station to Cottesloe Station – serves Stirling Road, Shenton Road, Servetus Street and North Street

=== Rail ===
- Fremantle Line
  - Swanbourne Station

== Politics ==
Swanbourne is part of the federal Division of Curtin. The seat is currently held by independent Kate Chaney, who won it at the 2022 Australian federal election, defeating the incumbent Liberal Party member. Curtin had long been regarded as a safe Liberal seat, having been held by the party or its predecessors for most of its history, with the exception of former Liberal member Allan Rocher, who served as an independent from 1996 to 1998. Chaney's election was part of a broader trend in traditionally safe Liberal electorates, where independent candidates were successful in campaigns focused on climate policy, political integrity, and gender equality.

Within the Parliament of Western Australia, Swanbourne falls within the state electoral district of Cottesloe, which is held by the Liberal Party.
