= Fremantle line =

Railway line in Perth, Western Australia

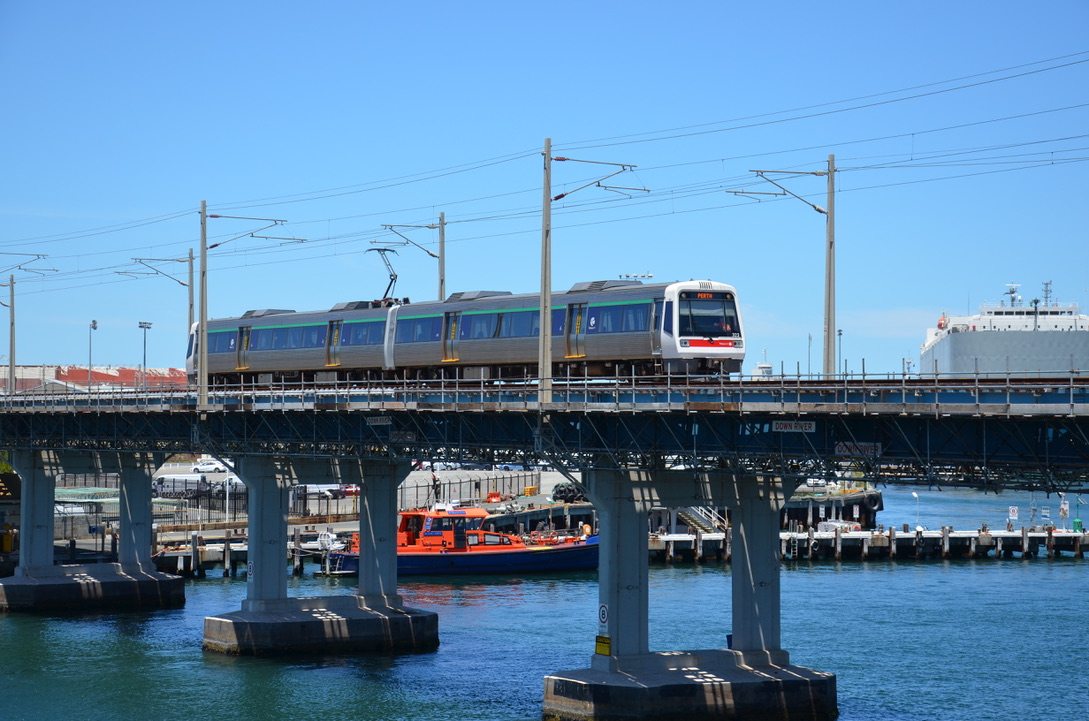
- An A-series train crossing over the Swan River via the Fremantle Railway Bridge, 2000s

Overview
- Owner: Public Transport Authority
- Locale: Perth, Western Australia
- Termini: Perth (north-east); Fremantle (south-west)
- Continues from: Midland line
- Stations: 17

Service
- Type: Suburban rail
- System: Transperth
- Operators: Public Transport Authority (2003–present); WAGR/Westrail (1890–2003)
- Depot: Claisebrook
- Rolling stock: Transperth A-series trains; Transperth B-series trains
- Ridership: 6,212,766 (year to June 2026)

History
- Opened: 1 March 1881
- Closed: 1 September 1979
- Reopened: 29 July 1983

Technical
- Line length: 19.0 km (11.8 mi)
- Number of tracks: 2
- Character: At-grade and underground
- Track gauge: 1,067 mm (3 ft 6 in) narrow gauge
- Electrification: 25 kV 50 Hz AC from overhead catenary
- Operating speed: 80 km/h (50 mph)
- Signalling: Fixed block signalling
- Train protection system: Automatic train protection
Route map
- Red shading denotes the Free Transit Zone

The Fremantle line is a suburban railway and service in Western Australia which connects the central business district (CBD) of Perth with the port city of Fremantle.

== History ==
The railway on which the service runs opened on 1 March 1881 as the first suburban railway line in Perth by William Robinson. It originally operated as the Eastern Railway and ran between Fremantle and Guildford, via central Perth. In March 1884, the railway line was extended via Midland Junction to Bellevue and later to Clackline, York and Northam. The railway line opened as a single track with a passing loop at Claremont, it was duplicated in 1896/97. A dedicated freight line was later added on the western side between Cottesloe and the Leighton Marshalling Yard.

On 22 October 1898, the railway line was extended south to Robbs Jetty, on 1 July 1903 via Cockburn to Coogee and on 19 December 1955 via Woodman Point to Kwinana. The Coogee to Woodman Point section closed on 16 September 1973, followed by Robbs Jetty to Coogee in February 1986.

In July 1926, the Fremantle Railway Bridge over the Swan River was partly washed away in a flood, with one line restored in October 1926 and the second in April 1928.

In the 1960s, as part of the standard gauge project, the section south of Cockburn was replaced by the Kwinana line on a different alignment. One of the lines north of Cockburn to the container terminal at North Quay and Leighton Marshalling Yard was converted to standard gauge. The Fremantle Railway Bridge was converted to dual gauge. A marshalling yard was built at Robb Jetty.

In 1966, the eastern railway metropolitan passenger services were curtailed to terminate at Midland.

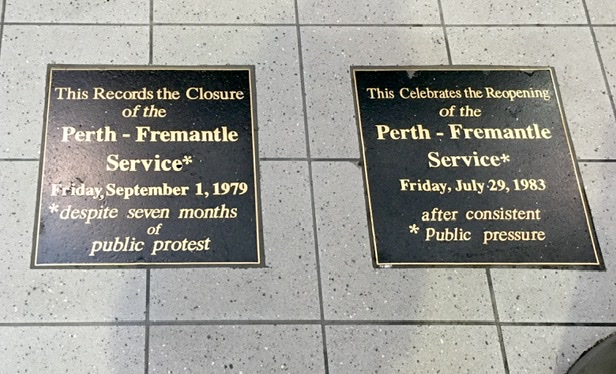
Plaques at Perth station commemorating the closure and reopening of the Fremantle line

Passenger services on the Fremantle line were suspended on 1 September 1979. The decision was based on three one day counts in 1971, 1975 and 1977. The Liberal government of Charles Court planned to convert the railway reserve into a busway, citing figures which showed a loss of $1.14 per passenger-journey on trains versus a loss of $0.26 per passenger-journey on buses. The closure of the line was opposed by Friends of the Railway (FOR), which submitted a petition of 100,000 signatures and prepared a 98-page report arguing for its retention. The railway was kept in working order despite the closure, initially because narrow gauge freight trains still used it to access Fremantle, there being no other narrow gauge access to the port. Later when a narrow gauge link was constructed from Cockburn to North Fremantle, trade unions had placed a ban on working on dismantling any track or equipment. The service was reinstated on 29 July 1983 following a change of government which saw Brian Burke and the Australian Labor Party (ALP) come to power. During the closure of the rail line, patronage dropped by 30%.

For the staging of the 1987 America's Cup, stations south of Fremantle were erected for use by special trains at The Esplanade, Success Harbour and South Beach. The Hotham Valley Railway operated a daily service on this section of the line with a W class steam locomotive as the Spinnaker Run between October 1986 and February 1987. The narrow and standard gauge lines were rebuilt as a single dual gauge line at the same time. Having been disused since 1987, the three stations were demolished in September 2018.

During 1990, work commenced on building a new North Fremantle station, 800 metres (870 yd) north of its original location, which opened for service on 28 July 1991. Leighton station, which was 700 metres (770 yd) further north, was demolished during the electrification of the line. Regular electric services started in September 1991. Today there are 17 stations on the line.

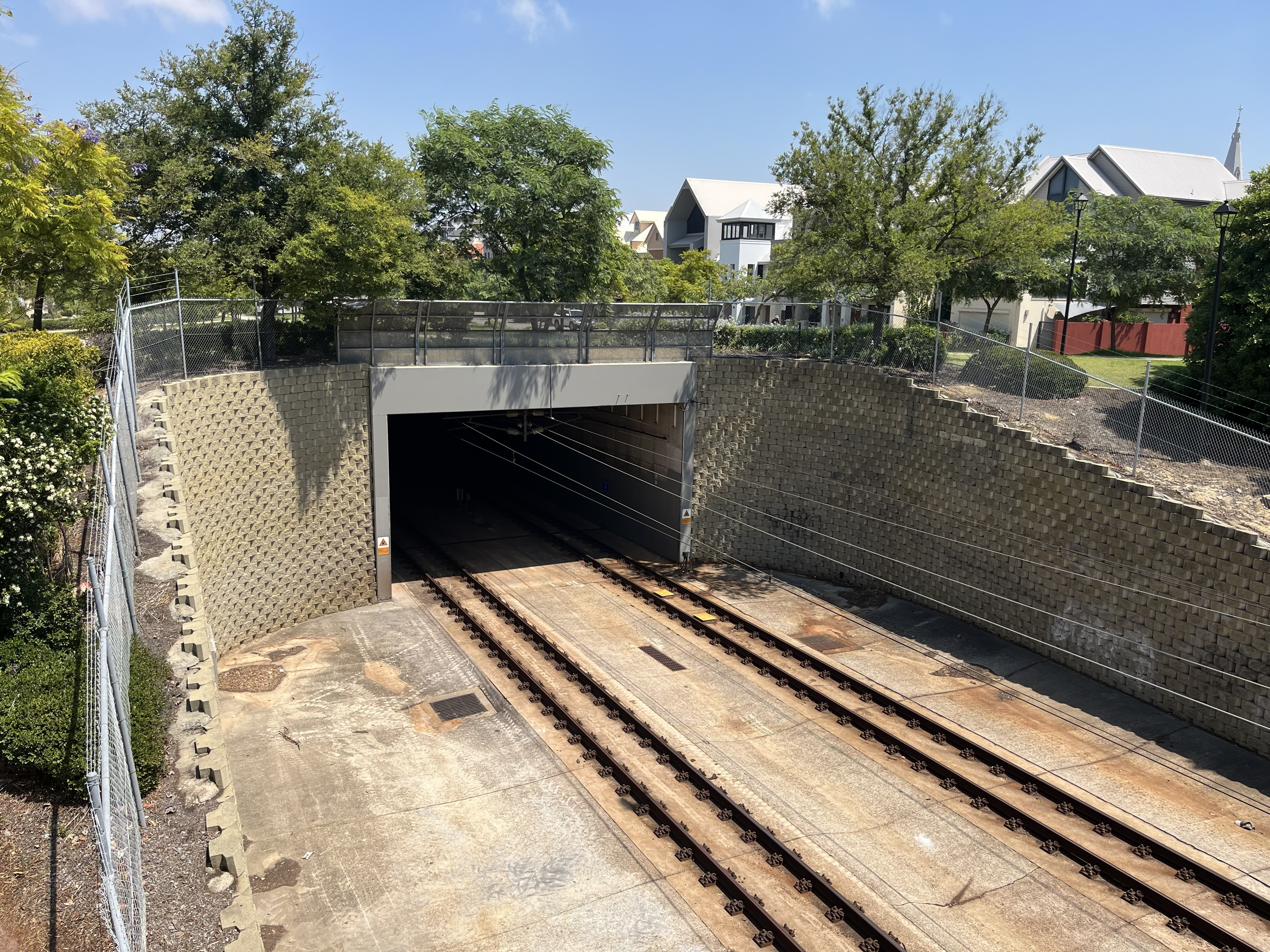
The eastern portal of the Subiaco tunnel, 2025

As part of the Subi Centro project, Subiaco station and 900 metres (980 yd) of the line were sunk in 1998. Between 2011 and 2014, the Fremantle line was sunk between Lake Street and the Horseshoe Bridge in the Perth CBD to allow for the redevelopment of the area. Perth station's former Fremantle to Midland platform became an island platform, with an additional platform and track built on the north side. Platforms west of the Horseshoe Bridge were demolished. In June 2011 a $237 million cost blow-out was revealed, added to a 2009 project estimate of $500 million.

The new tunnel was the first in Western Australia to use a rigid overhead conductor rail instead of overhead wires, the same system as used on the Madrid Metro. With overhead wires, the clearance between the new tunnel and the existing Yanchep line tunnel is only 75 cm (30 in). The new tunnel could be built to a smaller diameter by using a conductor rail, allowing for an increased clearance between the two. The new tunnel opened on 18 July 2013.

With the privatisation of Westrail in 2000, responsibility for the Perth to South Beach section passed to the Public Transport Authority and the South Beach to Cockburn Junction section to Arc Infrastructure, although operational responsibility for the standard gauge line is with Arc Infrastructure.

A new rail bridge over the Swan River in Fremantle has been planned to be built in future. It will carry the Fremantle line, with the existing bridge retained for use by freight trains to Fremantle Harbour.

== Services ==
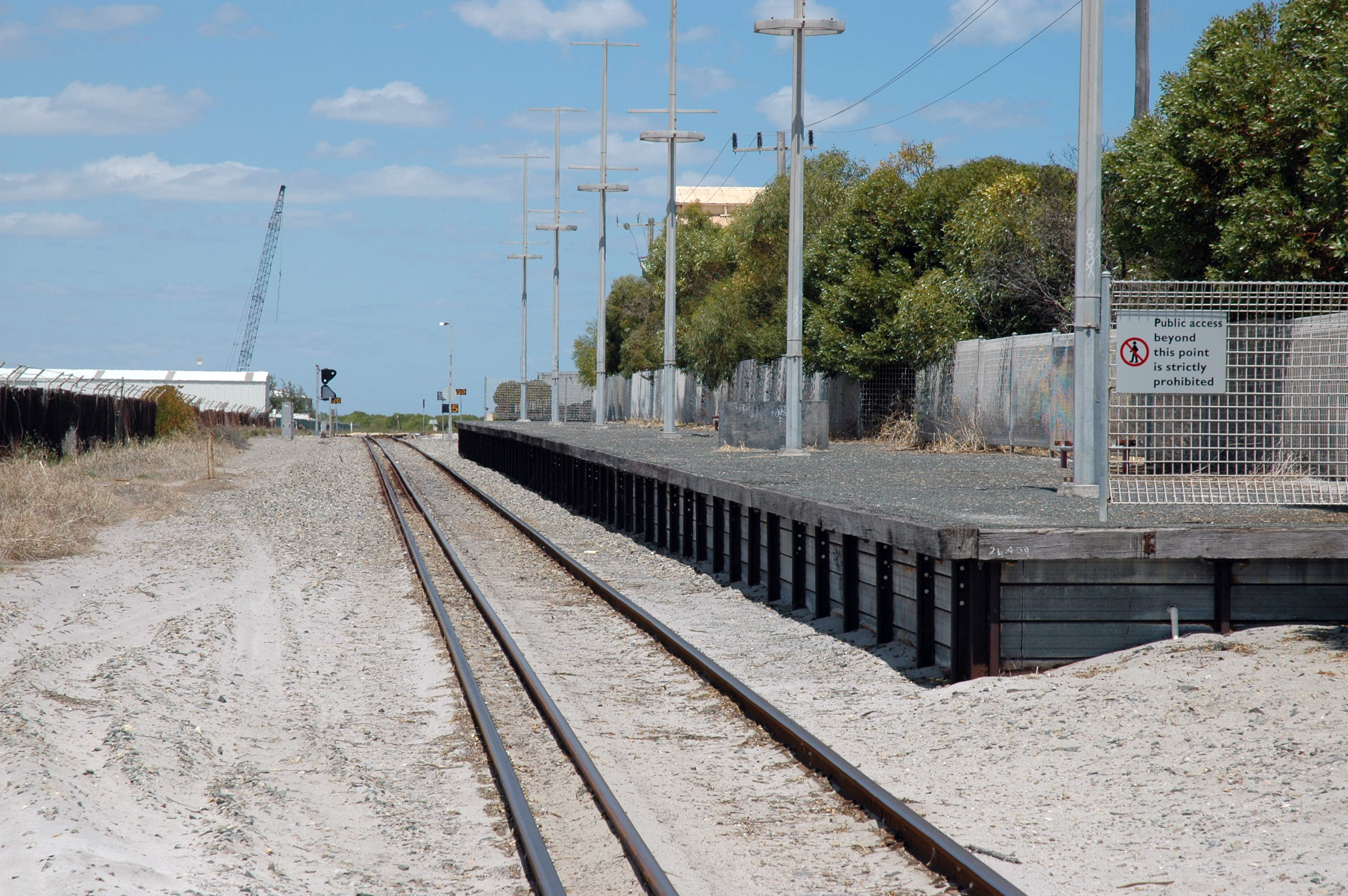
Dual gauge track at South Beach station, February 2006

Transperth operate services on the line from Fremantle through the Perth CBD to Midland on the Midland line. Freight services operate from Kewdale and Forrestfield to North Quay. Until July 2015 these were operated by Aurizon when SCT Logistics took over.

=== Stopping patterns ===
Legend — Stopping Patterns

- ● – All trains stop
- ◐ – Some services do not stop
- | – Trains pass and do not stop

Fremantle Services
| Station | Zone | All | +S | W | SE |
|---|---|---|---|---|---|
| Perth | 1 | ● | ● | ▲ | ● |
| City West | 1 | ● | ● | ▲ | | |
| West Leederville | 1 | ● | ● | ▲ | | |
| Subiaco | 1 | ● | ● | ▲ | | |
| Daglish | 1 | ● | ● | ▲ | | |
| Shenton Park | 1 | ● | ● | ▲ | | |
| Karrakatta | 1 | ● | ● | ▲ | | |
| Loch Street | 1 | ● | ● | ▲ | | |
| Showgrounds | 1 | | | ● | ◐ | ● |
| Claremont | 1/2 | ● | ● | ▲ | |
| Swanbourne | 1/2 | ● | ● | | |
| Grant Street | 1/2 | ● | ● | | |
| Cottesloe | 2 | ● | ● | | |
| Mosman Park | 2 | ● | ● | | |
| Victoria Street | 2 | ● | ● | | |
| North Fremantle | 2 | ● | ● | | |
| Fremantle | 2 | ● | ● | | |

== Rolling stock ==
Until the ADG class railcars entered service in 1953, services on the Fremantle line were operated by steam locomotives. Some peak-hour services continued to be steam hauled until the arrival of the ADK/ADB class diesel multiple units in 1968 resulted in the end of steam haulage. When the line was electrified in 1991, A-series electric multiple units took over. B-series electric multiple units have been used irregularly (for example, for special events services to West Leederville). Two three-car B-series trains were introduced on regular weekday peak services from 21 July 2019.

== Patronage ==
Fremantle line annual patronage
| Year | Patronage | ±% |
|---|---|---|
| 2010–11 | 8,198,224 | — |
| 2011–12 | 8,679,139 | +5.87% |
| 2012–13 | 8,866,211 | +2.16% |
| 2013–14 | 8,284,716 | −6.56% |
| 2014–15 | 8,228,255 | −0.68% |
| 2015–16 | 8,244,599 | +0.20% |
| 2016–17 | 7,940,853 | −3.68% |
| 2017–18 | 7,694,437 | −3.10% |
| 2018–19 | 7,476,804 | −2.83% |
| 2019–20 | 6,173,120 | −17.44% |
| 2020–21 | 4,853,233 | −21.38% |
| 2021–22 | 5,217,162 | +7.50% |
| 2022–23 | 5,256,226 | +0.75% |
| 2023–24 | 5,798,235 | +10.31% |
| 2024–25 | 5,947,360 | +2.57% |
| 2025–26 | 6,212,766 | +4.46% |

== Description ==
During hot weather, the tracks can distort. As a result, train speeds are reduced by approximately 20 km/h (12 mph) when the air temperature is above 37 °C (99 °F), and by an additional 10 km/h (6.2 mph) when the air temperature is above 41 °C (106 °F).

The Transperth network currently uses fixed block signalling and automatic train protection, which stops trains that pass a red signal and slows trains that drive too fast. These systems will be replaced by an automatic train control system, likely a communications-based train control system.

=== Route ===
Transperth system map, with the Fremantle line in blue.

=== Stations ===
Key
| Icon | Purpose |
|---|---|
| § | Special events station |

| Station | Distance from Perth | | Fare zone | Location | Opened | Connections |
| Station | km | mi | Fare zone | Location | Opened | Connections |
|---|---|---|---|---|---|---|
| Perth | 0.0 | 0.0 | 1/FTZ | Perth | 1881 | Bus at Perth Busport, Australind, Airport, Armadale, Ellenbrook, Mandurah, Thornlie–Cockburn and Yanchep lines Services continue on the Midland line |
| City West | 1.6 | 1.0 | 1/FTZ | West Perth | 1986 | Airport line |
| West Leederville | 2.7 | 1.7 | 1 | Subiaco, West Leederville | 1897 | Airport line |
| Subiaco | 3.6 | 2.2 | 1 | Subiaco | 1883 | Bus, Airport line |
| Daglish | 4.9 | 3.0 | 1 | Daglish, Subiaco | 1924 | Airport line |
| Shenton Park | 6.0 | 3.7 | 1 | Shenton Park | 1908 | Bus, Airport line |
| Karrakatta | 7.6 | 4.7 | 1 | Karrakatta | 1886 | Airport line |
| Loch Street | 8.0 | 5.0 | 1 | Claremont, Karrakatta | 1954 | Airport line |
| Showgrounds§ | 8.7 | 5.4 | 1 | Claremont | 1954 | Airport line |
| Claremont | 9.4 | 5.8 | 1 | Claremont | 1886 | Bus, Airport line |
| Swanbourne | 10.5 | 6.6 | 2 | Claremont, Swanbourne | 1904 | |
| Grant Street | 11.2 | 7.0 | 2 | Cottesloe | 1954 | |
| Cottesloe | 12.4 | 7.7 | 2 | Cottesloe | 1884 | |
| Mosman Park | 13.6 | 8.5 | 2 | Cottesloe, Mosman Park | 1894 | |
| Victoria Street | 14.2 | 8.8 | 2 | Cottesloe, Mosman Park | 1954 | |
| North Fremantle | 16.1 | 10.0 | 2 | North Fremantle | 1991 | |
| Fremantle | 19.0 | 11.8 | 2 | Fremantle | 1907 | Bus |

=== Stopping patterns and frequency ===
The Fremantle railway line has one all-stops service pattern. All stops services run every 15 minutes during the day from Monday to Sunday, every 12 minutes (five trains per hour) during the weekday peak period, and every half an hour or every hour at night; these frequencies are increased between Perth and Claremont due to Airport Line services. Before the Airport line began operation, weekday peak period frequency between Claremont and Fremantle was every 10 minutes. A special D stopping pattern servicing Shenton College previously ran between Perth station and Shenton Park station once daily in each direction. This pattern last ran and was deleted on 7 October 2022, due to the Airport line taking its place. The line previously ran some express stopping patterns in peak times, the two major patterns skipping many minor stations on different halves of the line, whilst both stop at Claremont, Subiaco, and City West.

== See also ==
- Last Train to Freo
- The Return (play)

== Sources ==
- Higham, Geoffrey (2007). Marble Bar to Mandurah: A History of Passenger Rail Services in Western Australia (1st ed.). Bassendean: Rail Heritage WA. ISBN 978-0-9803922-0-3. OCLC 271545712. Wikidata Q140375689.
