= Cottesloe railway station =

Railway station in Perth, Western Australia

Cottesloe
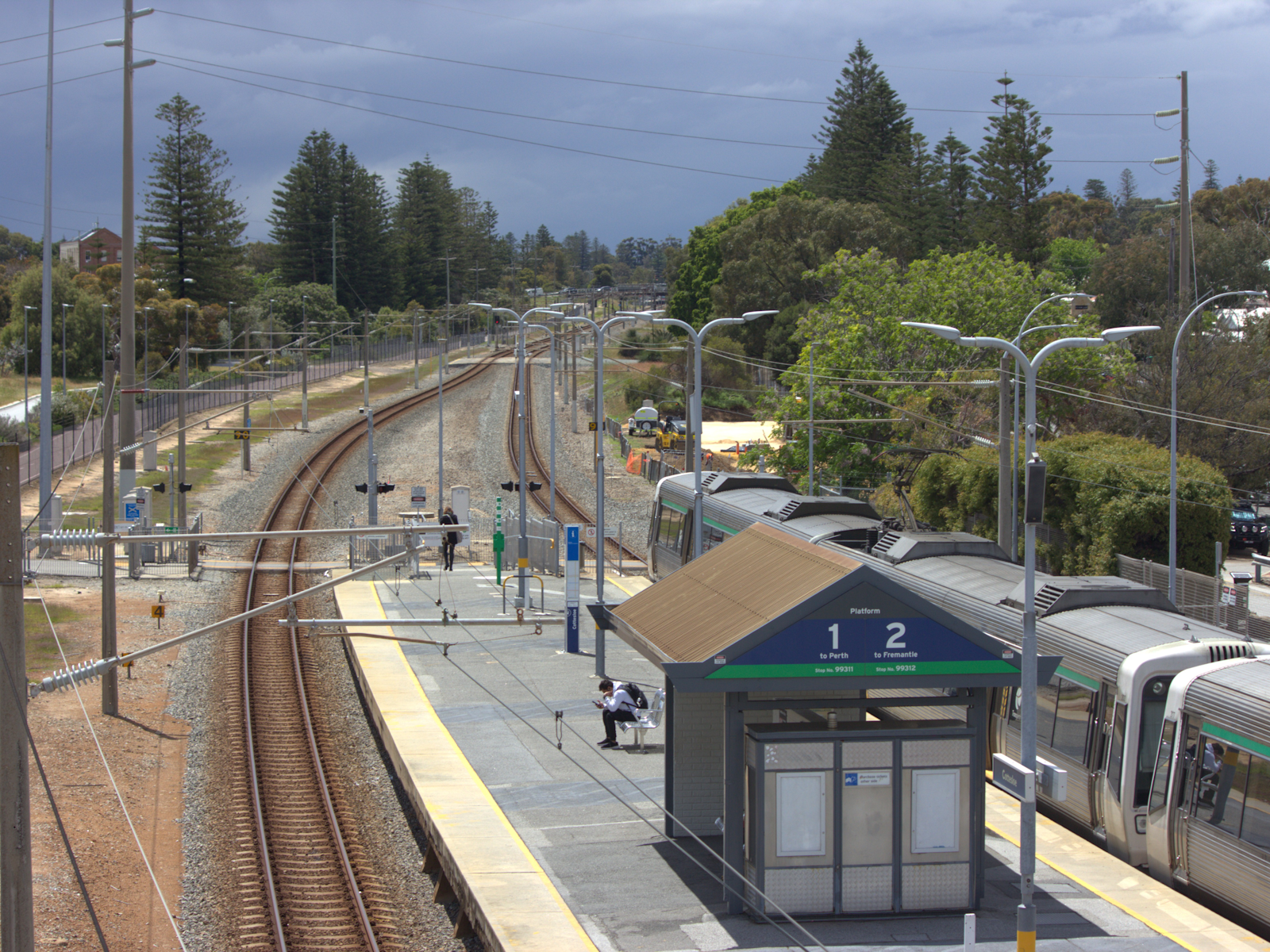
- Northbound view of both platforms, October 2025

General information
- Location: Curtin Avenue, Cottesloe; Australia
- Coordinates: 31°59′49″S 115°45′39″E
- Owner: Public Transport Authority
- Operator: Transperth
- Line: Fremantle line
- Distance: 12.4 kilometres (7.7 mi) from Perth
- Platforms: 2 (1 island)
- Tracks: 2

Construction
- Structure type: Ground

Other information
- Station code: FCE; 99311 (platform 1); 99312 (platform 2)
- Fare zone: 2

History
- Opened: 1884
- Former names: Bullens Siding

Passengers
- 2013–14: 261,865

Services
Preceding station	Transperth	Following station
Grant Street towards Perth	Fremantle line	Mosman Park towards Fremantle
Location
- Location of Cottesloe railway station

Cottesloe railway station is a railway station on the Transperth network. It is located on the Fremantle line, 12.4 kilometres from Perth station serving the suburbs of Cottesloe and Peppermint Grove.

== History ==
Cottesloe station was originally established as Bullens Siding in 1884. Robert Napoleon Bullen was the proprietor of the Albion Hotel. The station was a request stop. Passengers could stop the train with a provided red flag in daylight or a candle in a jar at night. In June 1892 the station was renamed Cottesloe and became a regular stop for trains.

The station closed on 1 September 1979 along with the rest of the Fremantle line, re-opening on 29 July 1983 when services were restored. Cottesloe was previously the junction for a now lifted parallel freight line that ran to the Leighton Marshalling Yard.

From 2034, Cottesloe station's platforms are planned to be extended to the north to accommodate six-car trains.

== Station location ==
Cottesloe station is located on the eastern edge of Cottesloe near the boundary with Peppermint Grove. The tracks lie between Curtin Avenue and Railway Street, two important roads in the area. There are two access points from each of these roads: At the southern end of the platform a pedestrian bridge provides access by stairs to the platform; those on the northern end of the platform require crossing the tracks at grade level to reach the platform.

== Services ==
Cottesloe station is served by Transperth Fremantle line services from Fremantle to Perth that continue through to Midland via the Midland line.

Cottesloe station saw 261,865 passengers in the 2013–14 financial year.

== Platforms ==
Cottesloe station had three platforms. During electrification of the line in 1991, the original northbound platform became southbound and the goods platform was converted for northbound services with the original southbound platform now disused. The goods line originally headed north to service the local Eureka flour mill. A graded grass corridor still marks the site of the track. There was once a staffed signal cabin on the western end of the station which has been relocated and preserved at Bennett Brook Railway.

Cottesloe platform arrangement
Stop ID	Platform	Line	Service Pattern	Destination	Via	Notes
99311	1	Fremantle line	All stations	Perth		
99312	2	Fremantle line	All stations	Fremantle		

== Bus routes ==
A regular bus service stops on the eastern side of the station. Bus route 102 operates at 30-minute intervals with Cottesloe station acting as its terminus. Rail replacement route 906 uses the western side of the station on Curtin Avenue but only operates to replace trains during line closures.

Stop	Route	Destination / description	Notes
Railway Street	102	to Claremont Station via Marine Parade & North Street	
Curtin Avenue (north bound)	906	Rail replacement service to Perth station	
Curtin Avenue (south bound)	906	Rail replacement service to Fremantle station	
