= South Beach railway station =

Former railway station in South Fremantle, Western Australia

South Beach
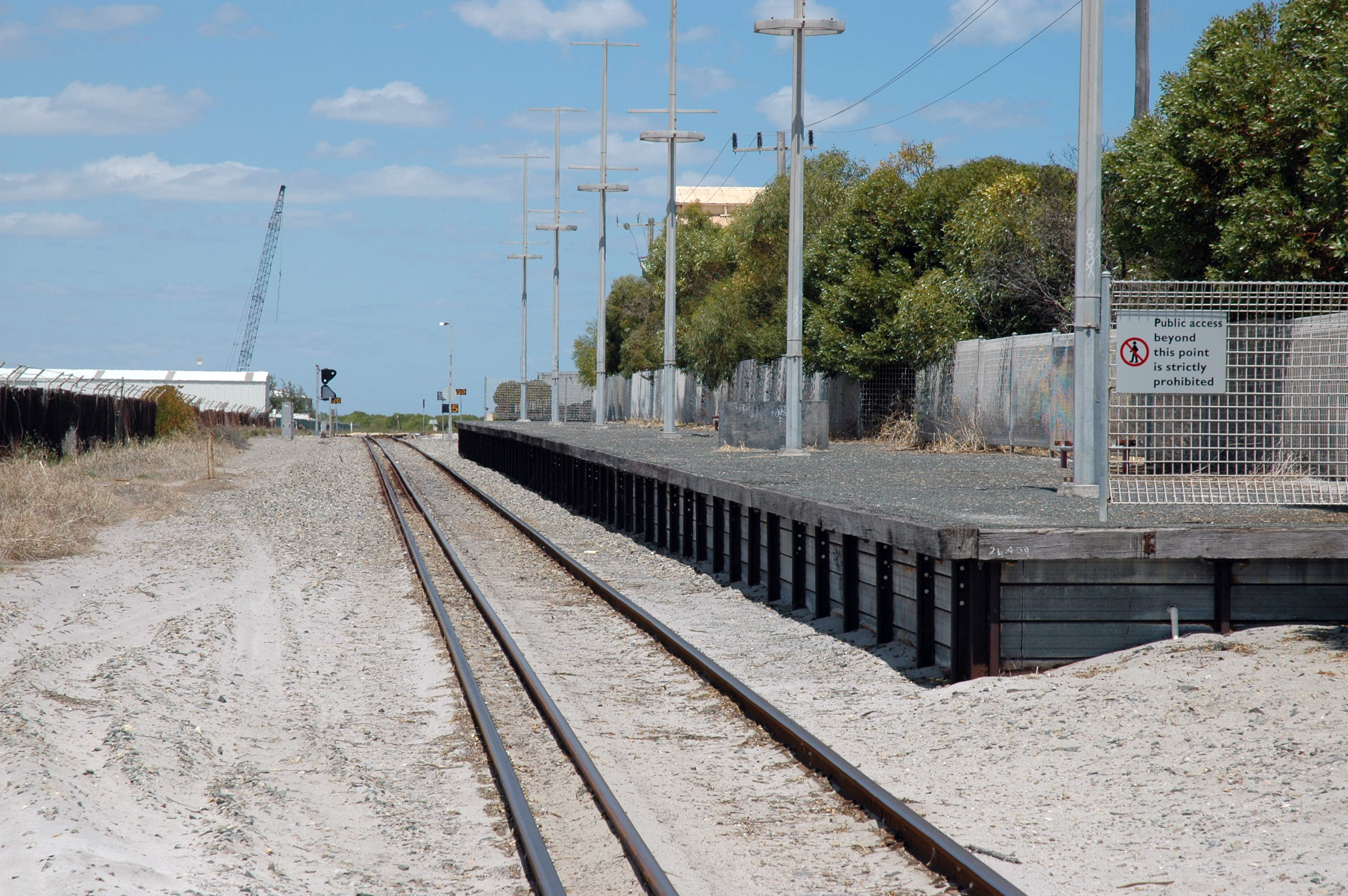
- Southbound view in February 2006

General information
- Location: Ocean Drive, South Fremantle; Australia
- Coordinates: 32°04′38″S 115°45′10″E
- Owner: Public Transport Authority
- Operator: Transperth
- Line: Fremantle
- Distance: 22.0 kilometres (13.7 mi) from Perth
- Platforms: 1
- Tracks: 1

Construction
- Structure type: Ground

History
- Opened: 1986
- Closed: 1987

Services
Preceding station	Transperth	Following station
Success Harbour towards Perth	Fremantle line	Terminus
Location

South Beach railway station was a railway station on the Transperth network. It was located on the Fremantle line, 22 kilometres (14 mi) from Perth station in South Fremantle.

== History ==
On 22 October 1898, the Fremantle line was extended south from Fremantle to Robbs Jetty.

For the staging of the 1987 America's Cup, the existing narrow and standard gauge tracks were combined as one dual gauge line with three temporary stations erected, one of which was South Beach. Between October 1986 and February 1987, the Hotham Valley Railway operated a daily service on this section of the line with a W class steam locomotive as the Spinnaker Run. This was supplemented by Transperth special services. Having not been used since, the station was demolished in September 2018.
