= Fremantle railway station =

Railway station in Fremantle, Western Australia

Fremantle
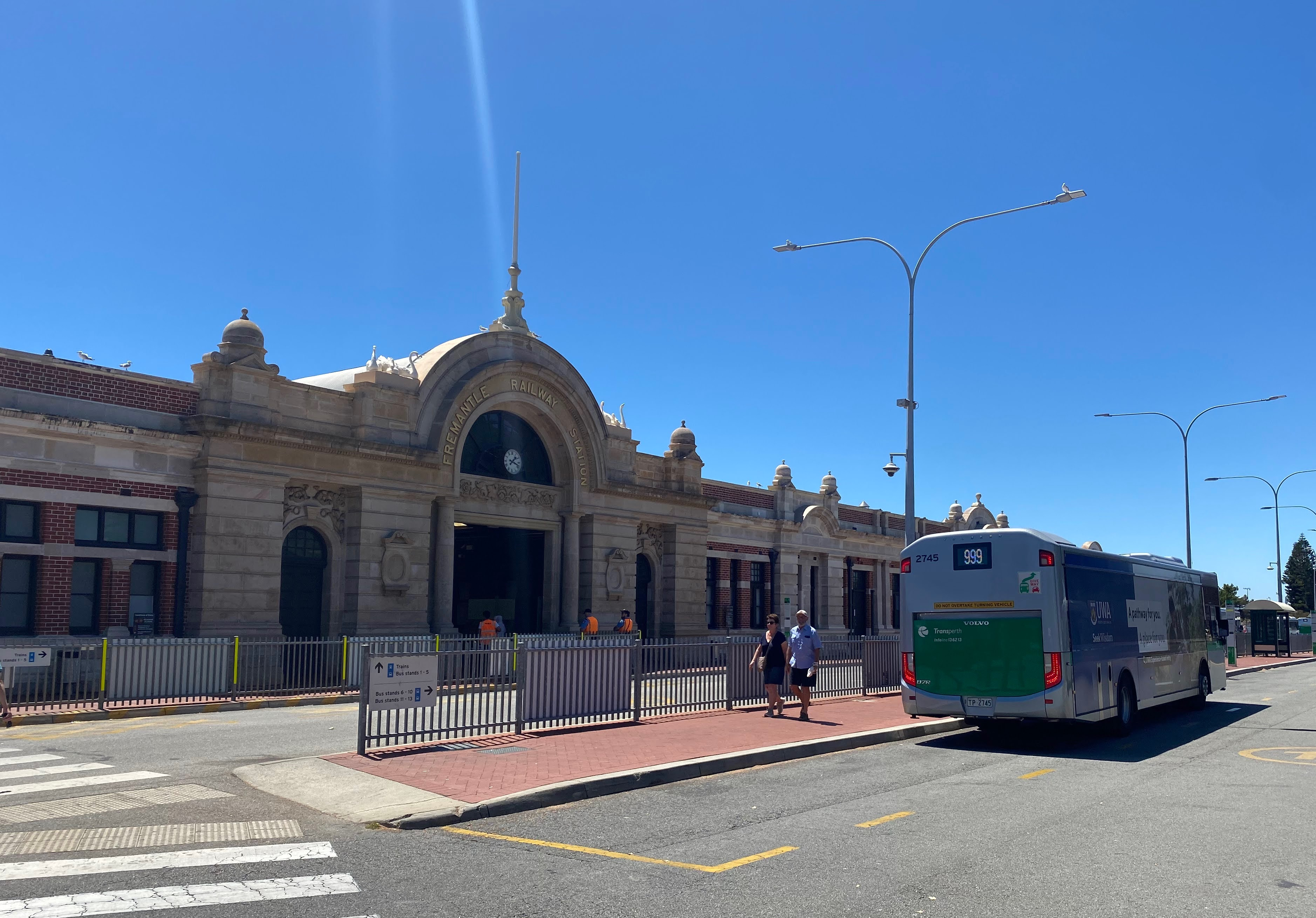
- Station building and bus stands, February 2023

General information
- Location: Phillimore Street, Fremantle
- Coordinates: 32°03′07″S 115°44′44″E
- Owner: Public Transport Authority
- Operator: Transperth
- Line: Fremantle line
- Distance: 18.7 kilometres (11.6 mi) from Perth
- Platforms: 2 (1 bay, 1 side)
- Tracks: 4
- Bus routes: 18
- Bus stands: 13, 11 currently in use

Construction
- Structure type: Ground
- Accessible: Yes
- Architectural style: Federation Free Classical

Other information
- Station code: FFE; 99351 (platform 1); 99352 (platform 2); 99353 (platform 3)
- Fare zone: 2

History
- Opened: 1 July 1907

Passengers
- 2013–14: 1,481,023

Services
Preceding station	Transperth	Following station
North Fremantle towards Perth	Fremantle line	Terminus
Former services
North Fremantle towards Perth	Fremantle line	The Esplanade towards South Beach

Western Australia Heritage Register
- Type: State Registered Place
- Designated: 21 September 2001
- Reference no.: 974
Track layout
Track layout
- Source
Location
- Location of Fremantle railway station

Fremantle railway station is the terminus of Transperth's Fremantle line in Western Australia.

== History ==
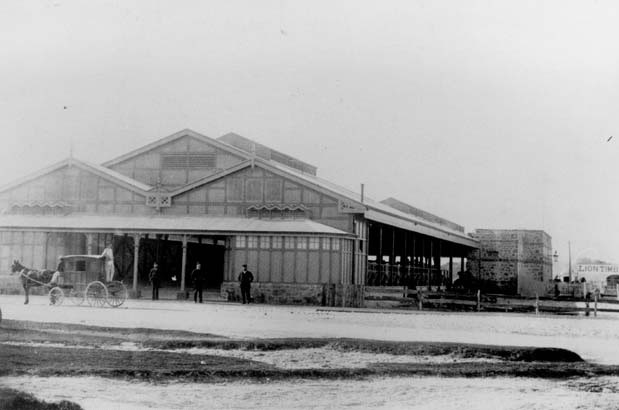
The first Fremantle railway station, 1881

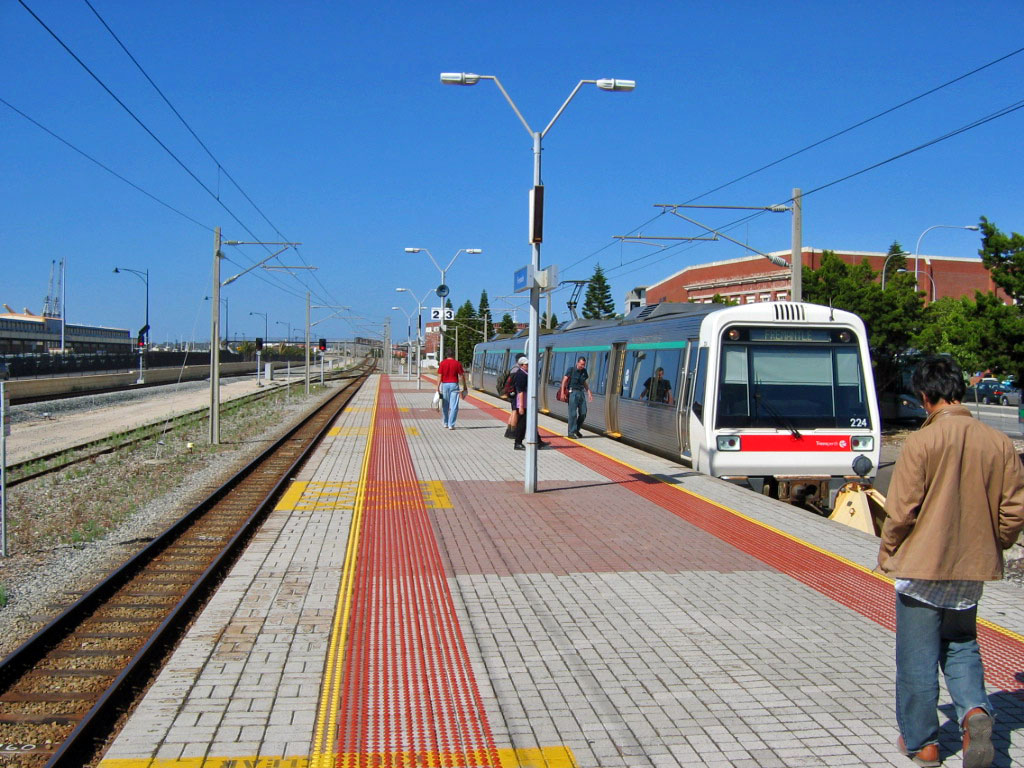
North-east view with an A series train at Platform 3 in December 2005

The original Fremantle station opened in Cliff Street on 1 March 1881 as the terminus of the Eastern Railway to Guildford via Perth. As the Eastern Railway was extended, its importance grew. It became an important hub for gold miners arriving in Western Australia via ship and then travelling to the Yilgarn and Eastern Goldfields when the line opened to Kalgoorlie in 1896.

In 1907, a new station and marshalling yards were established 300 metres to the north-east on the site of the former Fremantle Railway Workshops to better service the newly constructed Fremantle Harbour.

The station was designed by William Dartnall, Chief Engineer of Existing Lines of the Railway Department in 1905. The construction contract, at an estimated cost of £80,000, was awarded in May 1906 to S.B. Alexander and completed on 20 April 1907, with the official opening on 1 July 1907.

Originally, the station had three 150 metre platforms, one side and one island, with a subway connection and an overall roof. This had been taken out of use by the 1960s and was later demolished. Until the 1960s, passenger services continued south of Fremantle to Kwinana. A signal cabin was relocated from the eastern end of the platform to the Bennett Brook Railway in 1985.

The station closed on 1 September 1979 along with the rest of the Fremantle line. Following much public outcry and a change of government, it re-opened on 29 July 1983.

Opposite the station once lay an extensive yard. Today, only a stabling siding and dual gauge freight line that is served by trains from Cockburn to the container terminal at North Quay remain.

== Restoration ==
The station features Donnybrook stone construction on the façade with red face brick infill panels on a Donnybrook stone plinth, in Federation Free Classical style featuring a rare example of a large train hall roof. The facade remained unpainted (except for metalwork and timberwork) until it was painted in 1950.

The station was classified by the National Trust in 1974 and entered into the Heritage Council of Western Australia's Register of Heritage Places in 2001. A rationalisation of the rail reserve in 2004 was part of a plan to revitalise the precinct. In 2005, a program of staged conservation and restoration works in line with a conservation plan prepared in 1999 commenced. This included paint removal and restoration of the main entry façade, refurbishment of most of the internal areas and an electrical upgrade to bring the station up to modern standards. In August 2011, the project was completed with the restoration of external facades of the station building.

== In popular culture ==
Fremantle station featured in the 2006 film Last Train to Freo.

== Services ==
=== Train services ===
Fremantle station is the terminus of Transperth's Fremantle line, with frequent services to Perth that continue through to Midland via the Midland line.

Fremantle station saw 1,481,023 passengers in the 2013–14 financial year.

==== Platforms ====
Fremantle platform arrangement
Stop ID	Platform	Line	Service Pattern	Destination	Via	Notes
99351	1	Fremantle line	All stations, +S	Perth		The +S pattern stops at Showgrounds
99352	2	Fremantle line	All stations	Perth		Used primarily as an extension of platform 1
99353	3	Fremantle line	All stations, +S	Perth		The +S pattern stops at Showgrounds

=== Bus routes ===
==== Stands 1–5 ====
Stop	Route	Destination / description	Notes
Stand 1	906	Rail replacement service to Perth station	
Stand 2	659	to Optus Stadium via Canning Highway, Special Event Service	
Stand 3	548	to Rockingham station via Cockburn Road & Patterson Road	
Stand 4	549	to Rockingham station via Rockingham Road, Thomas Road, Gilmore Avenue, Kwinana Hub bus station & Dixon Road	
Stand 5	530	to Cockburn Central station via Rockingham Road, Yangebup Road, Osprey Road & Hammon Road	
Stand 5	531	to Cockburn Central station via Soutwell Crescent, Edeline Street, Marvell Avenue, The Grange & Beeliar Drive	
Stand 5	532	to Cockburn Central station via South Terrace, Clontarf Road, Hamilton Road, Mayor Road & Beeliar Drive	
Stand 5	520	to Cockburn Central station via Hampton Road, Forrest Road, Adventure World & North Lake Road	

==== Stands 6–10 ====
Stop	Route	Destination / description	Notes
Stand 6			Set down only
Stand 7	999	CircleRoute anti-clockwise to Galleria Bus Station via South Street & Southlands Boulevarde	Limited stops
Stand 8	511	to Murdoch station via Lefroy Road, Winterfold Road, McCombe Avenue, Lesouef Drive & Somerville Boulevard	
Stand 8	513	to Murdoch station via Lefroy Road, Ralson Street, Cordella Avenue, Coolbellup Avenue & South Street	
Stand 9	107	to Claremont station via Stirling Highway & Mosman Park	
Stand 10	998	CircleRoute clockwise to Galleria Bus Station via Stirling Highway, Claremont Station & Stirling station	Limited stops

==== Stands 11–13 ====
|route=500

Stop	Route	Destination / description	Notes
Stand 11	111	to East Perth via Canning Highway, Canning Bridge station, Kwinana Freeway & Elizabeth Quay Bus Station	
Stand 11	910	to Perth Busport via Canning Highway, Canning Bridge station & Victoria Park transfer station	
Stand 12	148	to Applecross via Bicton & Attadale	
Stand 12	158	to East Perth via Bicton & Attadale	
Stand 12	160	to Hale Street, East Perth via North Lake Road, South Street, Booragoon bus station & Reynolds Road	
Stand 13	502	to Bull Creek station via Amherst Street, Watkins Street, Sainsbury Road & Leach Highway	
Stand 13	915	to Bull Creek station via Marmion Street, Booragoon bus station, Riseley Street & Leach Highway	
