= List of Transperth bus stations =

Buses in Perth, Western Australia, are owned and managed by the Public Transport Authority (PTA) under the Transperth brand. The majority of Perth's bus stations are located next to train stations.

== Bus stations ==
Station	Image	Fare zone	Location	Opened	Notes
Booragoon		2	Booragoon		
Causeway		1	Victoria Park		Formerly known as Victoria Park transfer station. Renamed on 28 January 2024.
Curtin Central		1	Bentley	12 February 2019	
Curtin University		1	Bentley	17 November 1999	
Elizabeth Quay		1	Perth	30 November 1991	Connections to the Yanchep line and Mandurah line at Elizabeth Quay railway station.
Galleria		1	Morley	1 July 1994	Formerly known as Morley bus station. Renamed on 9 December 2024.
Kalamunda		3	Kalamunda		
Karrinyup		2	Karrinyup		
Kwinana		4	Kwinana Town Centre		
Mirrabooka		2	Mirrabooka		
Perth Busport		1	Perth	17 July 2016	Connections to the Airport, Armadale, Fremantle, Yanchep, Mandurah, Midland, and Thornlie–Cockburn lines at Perth railway station. Replaced Roe Street bus station and Wellington Street bus station.
Perth Stadium	View of Perth Stadium bus station from high up in the stadium	1	Burswood	2018	Only operates for events at Perth Stadium
Scarborough Beach		2	Scarborough		

== Bus and train transfers ==
Station	Image	Fare zone	Location	Line(s)	Opened
Alkimos		5	Alkimos	Yanchep line	
Armadale		4	Armadale	Armadale line	
Aubin Grove		3	Atwell, Success	Mandurah line	
Ballajura		2	Whiteman	Ellenbrook line	9 December 2024
Bassendean		1	Bassendean	Midland line	
Bayswater		2	Bayswater	Airport line Ellenbrook line Midland line	
Bull Creek		2	Bateman, Bull Creek	Mandurah line	
Butler		4	Butler	Yanchep line	
Byford		6	Byford	Armadale line	
Canning Bridge		1	Como	Mandurah line	
Cannington		2	Cannington, East Cannington	Armadale line Thornlie–Cockburn line	
Carlisle		1	Carlisle, East Victoria Park	Armadale line Thornlie–Cockburn line	Since 9 June 2025
Claremont		1	Claremont	Airport line Fremantle line	
Clarkson		3	Clarkson	Yanchep line	
Cockburn Central		3	Cockburn Central, Jandakot	Mandurah line	
Cottesloe		2	Cottesloe	Fremantle line	
Eglinton		5	Eglinton	Yanchep line	
Ellenbrook		3	Ellenbrook	Ellenbrook line	9 December 2024
Fremantle		2	Fremantle	Fremantle line	
Glendalough		1	Glendalough, Osborne Park, Mount Hawthorn	Yanchep line	
Gosnells		3	Gosnells	Armadale line	
High Wycombe		2	High Wycombe	Airport line	9 October 2022
Joondalup		3	Joondalup	Yanchep line	
Kelmscott		3	Kelmscott	Armadale line	
Kwinana		4	Bertram, Parmelia	Mandurah line	
Lakelands		7	Lakelands	Mandurah line	
Leederville		1	Leederville	Yanchep line	
Maddington		2	Maddington	Armadale line	
Mandurah		7	Mandurah	Mandurah line	
Midland		2	Midland	Midland line	
Morley		2	Embleton, Morley	Ellenbrook line	9 December 2024
Murdoch		2	Leeming, Murdoch	Mandurah line	
Nicholson Road		2	Canning Vale	Thornlie–Cockburn line	9 June 2025
Noranda		2	Morley, Noranda	Ellenbrook line	9 December 2024
Oats Street		1	Carlisle, East Victoria Park	Armadale line Thornlie–Cockburn line	
Ranford Road		2	Canning Vale	Thornlie–Cockburn line	9 June 2025
Redcliffe		2	Redcliffe	Airport line	9 October 2022
Rockingham		5	Cooloongup, Rockingham	Mandurah line	
Shenton Park		1	Shenton Park	Airport line Fremantle line	
Stirling		2	Innaloo, Osborne Park, Stirling	Yanchep line	
Subiaco		1	Subiaco	Airport line Fremantle line	
Thornlie		2	Thornlie	Thornlie–Cockburn line	
Warnbro		5	Warnbro	Mandurah line	
Warwick		2	Carine, Duncraig, Hamersley, Warwick	Yanchep line	
Wellard		4	Wellard	Mandurah line	
Whiteman Park		2	Whiteman	Ellenbrook line	9 December 2024
Whitfords		3	Craigie, Kingsley, Padbury, Woodvale	Yanchep line	
Yanchep			6	Yanchep	Yanchep line

== Future bus and train transfers ==
Station	Fare zone	Location	Line
4	2025		

== Former bus stations ==
Station	Image	Fare zone	Location	Opened	Closed
Ellenbrook		3	Henley Brook	2006	2 November 2019
Henley Brook		3	Henley Brook	3 November 2019	9 December 2024
Wellington Street		1	Perth	2 March 1973	January 2014
Rockingham		5	Rockingham	November 1974	7 October 2007
Roe Street		1	Perth	12 January 2014	17 July 2016

== See also ==
- List of bus routes in Perth, Western Australia
- List of Transperth railway stations
