= City West (disambiguation) =

City West is an area in the centre of Berlin, Germany.

City West, CityWest or Citywest may also refer to:

== Australia ==
- City West campus, Adelaide, a campus of the University of South Australia
- City West Housing, nonprofit company in NSW
- City West railway station, Perth
- City West Water, a former government agency based in Melbourne

== Ireland ==
- Citywest, Dublin, a business park and suburb
  - Citywest Campus Luas stop, tram stop in the Dublin suburb

== United Kingdom ==
- CityWest Homes, Westminster, London, a housing association
- City West Housing Trust, Salford, Greater Manchester, a housing association

== United States ==
- City West, Indiana, an abandoned village
- City West station (Minnesota), a planned light rail station in Eden Prairie, Minnesota

== Elsewhere ==
- CityWest, a cable company and ISP in British Columbia, Canada
- St. John's City West (Antigua), a parliamentary constituency

== See also ==
- West City, Illinois, United States, a village
- West End (disambiguation)
