= List of bus routes in Perth =

Buses in Perth, Western Australia, are operated under the brand Transperth. The Public Transport Authority of the Government of Western Australia tenders the provision of bus routes in Perth to private operators; privatisation of Transperth services began in 1993 and was completed in July 1998. Path Transit, Swan Transit and Transdev WA currently operate services.

== Bus operations ==
As of 2019, all routes operated under Transperth are serviced by accessible buses. Typical Perth bus routes operate every 10–20 minutes in peak times, and every 30–60 minutes off peak on weekdays. Services generally finish before midnight, though many routes finish earlier, between 6:00 pm and 11:00 pm. Weekend services are approximately half weekday levels. Major routes are more frequent, operating every 10–15 minutes off peak on weekdays, and every 15–30 minutes on weekends and evenings.

Most bus routes terminate in Perth, at Elizabeth Quay, Perth Busport, in East Perth, and at suburban bus stations or railway stations. Some services in older areas terminate by looping on suburban streets.

=== Zero fare routes ===
CAT routes are zero fare, circular services which operate in the central business districts of Perth, major regional centre Joondalup, and on a route (Surf CAT) linking Stirling and Scarborough. They operate every 5–15 minutes on weekdays, and every 15 minutes on weekends except for Joondalup CAT routes. Similar circular services also operate in the Midland and Rockingham central business districts, although the Rockingham service charges a fare.

=== CircleRoute ===
The CircleRoute is a circular service which operates in inner suburbs of Perth. Numbered 998 clockwise and 999 anticlockwise, it connects major hospitals, universities, schools, shopping centres, and all urban rail lines.

=== High frequency routes ===
Some routes numbered in the 900s are high frequency routes. High frequency bus services operate at minimum every 15 minutes between 7am and 7pm on weekdays, 8am and 7pm on Saturdays, and 9am and 7pm on Sundays. Since 2014, several high frequency routes have been introduced, and other routes have been renumbered to the 900s to indicate high frequency.

Route	Date introduced	Routes replaced
910	11 October 2015	105, 106
915	19 July 2020	501
920	5 July 2026	100
925	9 June 2025	507
930	31 January 2016	210, 211, 212
935	7 August 2016	37
940	10 October 2022	36, 40, 295, 296, 299
950	27 January 2014	21, 22, 78, 79
960	9 October 2016	885, 888
970	9 October 2016	370, 870
975	9 December 2024	371
980	13 November 2022	60
990	4 May 2014	400, 408
995	18 July 2021	102, 107
998	31 January 2016	98
999	31 January 2016	99
996	1 November 2026	998, 999
997	1 November 2026	998, 999
998	1 November 2026	998, 999
999	1 November 2026	998, 999

Route 950 operates between Morley, Elizabeth Quay, University of Western Australia and Queen Elizabeth II Medical Centre. It is the highest frequency bus route in Perth, operating up to every minute in peak times, every 7–8 minutes off peak on weekdays, and up to every 10 minutes on weekends. When introducing the route, the Public Transport Authority marketed it as the Superbus.

Route 960 operates between Mirrabooka, Edith Cowan University, Mount Lawley, Perth Busport, Victoria Park Bus Transfer station, and Curtin University. It is the second-highest frequency bus route in Perth, operating up to 5–10 minutes in peak times, every 10–20 minutes off peak on weekdays, and every 15–30 minutes on weekends. The route was intended to replicate the success of Route 950.

=== Timetables ===
Timetables were, between 1999 and 2016, colour coded to indicate which area of the Perth metropolitan area they serve: green for the northern area, red for the eastern area, yellow for the south eastern area, orange for the southern area, and blue for the western area. Timetables for CAT services are silver, and timetables for high frequency services are aqua.

Currently, they are coded based on the type of service they run: normal services are white with green details, high frequency services are aqua with white details, and CAT services are silver with black details.

== Bus routes by route number ==
=== 0–99 ===
72	From	To	Via	Variations	Refs
1: Blue CAT	Kings Park	Perth Busport	Elizabeth Quay, Barrack Street and Aberdeen Street		
2: Red CAT	WACA	Outram Street (West Perth)	Hay Street and Murray Street	On Stadium event days extends to the Matagarup Bridge	
3: Yellow CAT	Claisebrook Station (East Perth)	Princess Margaret Hospital (West Perth)	Wellington Street and Sutherland Street		
4: Red CAT	Outram Street (West Perth)	Perth Station			
5: Green CAT	Elizabeth Quay	Leederville Station	Kings Park Road and Colin Street		
6: Purple CAT	Elizabeth Quay	University of Western Australia	Kings Park Road, Thomas Street and QEII Medical Centre		
10: Red CAT	Joondalup Station	Joondalup CBD	Lakeside Drive and Grand Boulevard		
11: Blue CAT	Joondalup Station	Joondalup CBD	Grand Boulevard and Lakeside Drive		
13: Yellow CAT	Joondalup Station	Edith Cowan University Joondalup	Joondalup Drive and Kendrew Cress		
15	Perth Busport	Glendalough Station	Oxford Street and Egina Street	(Note: Selected Route 15 services deviate via Leederville Gardens Retirement Estate)	
19	Perth Busport	Flinders Square	Fitzgerald Street, Alexander Drive and Holmfirth Street	(Note: Selected Route 19 services deviate via Plantation Street, Menora)	
20	Edith Cowan University Mount Lawley	Galleria Bus Station	Wellington Road, Light Street, Alexander Drive and Dianella Plaza		
23	Elizabeth Quay	Claremont Station	Beatrice Road, UWA and Mounts Bay Road		
24	East Perth	Claremont Station	Kings Park Road, Queen Elizabeth II Medical Centre and Waratah Avenue	(Note: Selected Route 24 services terminate at Perth Children's Hospital)	
25	Shenton Park Station	Claremont Station	Aberdare Road, Queen Elizabeth II Medical Centre and Princess Road	(Note: Selected Route 25 services deviate via Melvista Homes; selected serviced terminate at Hollywood Private Hospital)	
27	East Perth	Claremont Station	Bagot Road and Lemnos Street	(Note: Selected Route 27 services terminate on Lemnos Street before Bedbrook Place, Shenton Park)	
28	Perth Busport	Claremont Station	Wellington Street, Hay Street (to Claremont), Rokeby Road (to East Perth only) and Underwood Ave	(Note: Selected Route 28 services deviate via Floreat Forum; selected services terminate in Mount Claremont)	
30	Perth Busport	Curtin University Bus Station	Elizabeth Quay, Labouchere Road and Hope Road	(Note: Selected Route 30 services deviate via Manning Hub, Aquinas College and Gracewood Hostel; selected services terminate on Elderfield Road near Henning Crescent, Manning)	
31	Perth Busport	Salter Point	Elizabeth Quay, Labouchere Road and Caravan Crescent		
32	Elizabeth Quay	Como	Coode Street and Mill Point Road	(Note: Selected Route 32 services deviate via Hurlingham Road, Manning Terrace, Swanview Terrace and Brookside Avenue)	
33	Elizabeth Quay	Curtin Central Bus Station	Kensington		
34	Perth Busport	Cannington Station	Elizabeth Quay, South Perth, Como, Curtin Central Bus Station and Curtin University Bus Station	(Note: Selected Route 34 services terminate at Curtin University Bus Station)	
35	Elizabeth Quay	South Perth (Old Mill)	Mill Point Road		
37	Oats Street Station	Airport Central Station	Belmont Forum Shopping Centre		
38	Perth Busport	Cloverdale	Archer Street and Belmont Forum Shopping Centre		
39	Elizabeth Quay	Redcliffe Station	Star Street and Belmont Forum Shopping Centre		
40	Elizabeth Quay	Galleria Bus Station	Lord Street, Guildford Road and Bayswater Station		
41	Elizabeth Quay	Bayswater Station	Lord Street, Guildford Road and Caledonian Avenue		
42	Elizabeth Quay	Maylands	Lord Street, Guildford Road, Eighth Avenue and Peninsula Road		
43	Elizabeth Quay	Maylands	Lord Street, Guildford Road, Central Avenue and Peninsula Road	(Note: Selected Route 43 services deviate via Ninth Avenue and Maylands Shopping Centre)	
45	Bayswater Station	Bassendean Town Center	Ashfield		
46	Bayswater Station	Morley Station	Irvine Street and Embleton Avenue		
47	Bassendean Station	Morley Station	Collier Road and Embleton Avenue		
51	Perth Busport	Westfield Carousel	Orrong Road and Wharf Street		
67	Perth Busport	Mirrabooka Bus Station	Beaufort Street and Grand Promenade		
68	Perth Busport	Mirrabooka Bus Station	Beaufort Street and Lennard Street		
72	Elizabeth Quay	Cannington Station	Victoria Park and Curtin University Bus Station	(Note: Selected Route 72 services terminate at Curtin University Bus Station; selected services terminate on Bungaree Road after Westlake Street, Wilson)	
73	Elizabeth Quay	Ranford Road Station	Victoria Park and Curtin University Bus Station		
81	Perth Busport	City Beach	Cambridge Street and Oceanic Drive	(Note: Selected Route 81 services deviate via Floreat Forum and Oceanic Drive near Challenger Parade, City Beach)	
82	Perth Busport	City Beach	Cambridge Street and The Boulevard	(Note: Selected Route 82 services deviate via Ocean Gardens Retirement Village; selected services extend to Launcestion Avenue, City Beach)	
83	Perth Busport	City Beach	Grantham Street and Empire Avenue	(Note: Selected Route 83 services deviate via Floreat Forum)	
84	Perth Busport	City Beach	Grantham Street and Pearson Street		
85	Perth Busport	Glendalough Station	Cambridge Street and Herdsman Parade	(Note: Selected Route 85 services terminate on Cambridge Street near Marlow Street, Wembley)	
95	Subiaco Station	Glendalough Station	Bob Hawke College and Harborne Street		
96	Leederville Station	UWA	Thomas Street	(Note: Selected Route 96 services extend to Nangar Street, Yokine; selected services terminate at QEII Medical Centre)	
97	Subiaco Station	UWA	Rokeby Road and Queen Elizabeth II Medical Centre		

=== 100–199 ===
Route	From	To	Via	Variations	Refs
101	Canning Bridge Station	Curtin Central Bus Station	Lawson Street and Curtin University Bus Station	(Note: Selected Route 101 services terminate at Curtin University Bus Station)	
102	Claremont Station	Cottesloe Station	Cottesloe Beach		
103	Elizabeth Quay Bus Station	Claremont Station	Thomas Street, Queen Elizabeth II Medical Centre and Stirling Highway		
107	Claremont Station	Fremantle Station	Mosman Park	(Note: Selected Route 107 services deviate via Rocky Bay Childrens Home; selected services deviate via Presbyterian Ladies College; selected services terminate at Cottesloe Station; selected services terminate on Leake Street after Stirling Street, Peppermint Grove; selected services terminate on Gibbon Street near Wellington Street, Mosman Park)	
111	Fremantle Station	East Perth	Elizabeth Quay Bus Station, Kwinana Freeway and Canning Highway		
114	Elizabeth Quay	Lake Coogee	Riseley Street, Booragoon Bus Station, Marmion Street, Carrington Street and Rockingham Road		
115	Elizabeth Quay	Hamilton Hill	Riseley Street, Booragoon Bus Station, Jackson Avenue, Somerville Boulevard, and Kardinya		
148	Fremantle Station	Como	Bicton, Attadale and Applecross		
158	Fremantle Station	Elizabeth Quay	Bicton, Attadale and Applecross		
160	Fremantle Station	East Perth	Booragoon Bus Station, Reynolds Road, North Lake Road and South Street	(Note: Selected Route 160 services deviate via Allambi Homes; selected services deviate via Webber Reserve; selected services terminate on Boon Street before Stock Road in Willagee)	
176	Elizabeth Quay	Oats Street Station	Albany Highway		
177	Elizabeth Quay	Cannington Station	Albany Highway and Chapman Road	(Note: Selected Route 177 services terminate on Wyong Road before Baldock Street, Bentley)	
178	Elizabeth Quay	Bull Creek Station	Albany Highway, Shelley and Rossmoyne	(Note: Selected Route 178 services terminate on Braibrise Road before Armstrong Road, Wilson; selected services terminate on Corbel Street near Tudor Avenue, Shelley)	

=== 200–299 ===
Route	From	To	Via	Variations	Refs
200	Bull Creek Station	Cannington Station	High Road, Riverton Forum Shopping Centre and Fern Road	(Note: Selected Route 200 services terminate on Bungaree Road after Margaret Street, Wilson)	
201	Bull Creek Station	Nicholson Road Station	High Road and Riverton Forum Shopping Centre		
202	Bull Creek Station	Cannington Station	Apsley Road, Riverton Forum Shopping Centre and Ferndale Crescent	(Note: Selected Route 202 services terminate on Metcalfe Road before Jaccard Way, Ferndale)	
203	Bull Creek Station	Cannington Station	Apsley Road, Vellgrove Avenue and Lynwood Avenue	(Note: Selected Route 203 services terminate on Vellgrove Avenue before Glencairn Way, Parkwood)	
204	Nicholson Road Station	Ranford Road Station	Baile Road		
205	Nicholson Road Station	Murdoch Station	Bannister Road	(Note: Selected Route 205 services deviate via Good Samaritan Industries)	
206	Murdoch University	Nicholson Road Station	Murdoch Station, Ranford Road Station and Eucalyptus Boulevard	(Note: Selected Route 206 services terminate at Murdoch Station; selected services terminate at Ranford Road Station)	
207	Murdoch University	Cannington Station	Murdoch Station, Ranford Road Station, Boardman Road and Nicholson Road Station	(Note: Selected Route 207 services terminate at Nicholson Road Station; selected services terminate at Ranford Road Station)	
208	Murdoch University	Cannington Station	Murdoch Station, Ranford Road Station, Forest Lakes Drive and Thornlie Station	(Note: Selected Route 208 services terminate at Thornlie Station)	
209	Murdoch TAFE Campus	Maddington Station	Murdoch Station, Ranford Road Station and Warton Road	(Note: Selected Route 209 services terminate at Murdoch Station)	
210	Nicholson Road Station	Maddington Station	Garden Street and Warton Road		
212	Thornlie Station	Nicholson Road Station	Wilfred Road		
213	Thornlie Station	Nicholson Road Station	Yale Road		
214	Thornlie Station	Southern River	Forest Lakes Drive and Harpenden Street	(Note: Selected Route 214 services extend to Castlewood Parkway after Edencourt Drive, Southern River)	
215	Thornlie Station	Gosnells Station	Corfield Street		
216	Thornlie Station	Gosnells Station	Fremantle Road		
219	Kelmscott Station	Armadale Station	Albany Highway		
220	Perth Busport	Armadale Station	Albany Highway	(Note: Selected Route 220 services deviate via Armadale Health Service)	
222	Cannington Station	Curtin University Bus Station	Bentley Health Service and Bentley Plaza Shopping Centre	(Note: Selected Route 222 services deviate via Workpower Bentley; selected services deviate to terminate at Workpower Bentley)	
224	Westfield Carousel	Airport Central Station	Thomas Street and Kewdale Road	(Note: Selected Route 224 services terminate at Welshpool)	
226	Westfield Carousel	Beckenham Station	Lacey Street and William Street		
227	Westfield Carousel	Maddington Central	Cannington Station, Kenwick Road, Maddington Station	(Note: Selected Route 229 services terminate at Maddington Station; selected services terminate at Kenwick Station; selected services terminate at Cannington Station)	
228	Thornlie Station	Gosnells Station	Maddington Station and Westfield Street	(Note: Selected Route 228 services terminate at Maddington Station)	
231	Gosnells Station	Gosnells Station	(Anticlockwise circular service)	(Note: Selected Route 231 services terminate on Verna Street near Corfield Street, Gosnells)	
232	Gosnells Station	Gosnells Station	(Clockwise circular service)	(Note: Selected Route 232 services terminate on Southern River Road near Chamberlain Street, Gosnells)	
233	Gosnells Station	Cockburn Central Station	Southern River, Harrisdale and Piara Waters	(Note: Selected Route 233 services terminate on Nicholson Road before Armadale Road, Piara Waters; selected services terminate on Southern River Road (Southern River College))	
240	Kelmscott Station	Clifton Hills	Martin Street		
241	Kelmscott Station	Roleystone	Brookton Highway	(Note: Selected Route 241 services deviate via Hillandale Village)	
243	Kelmscott Station	Armadale Station	Camilo and Seville Drive	(Note: Selected Route 243 services deviate via Banksia Road, Camillo)	
244	Kelmscott Station	Armadale Station	Braemore Street	(Note: Selected Route 244 services terminate on Eighth Road near Wollaston Avenue)	
245	Kelmscott Station	Armadale Station	Westfield Road and Seventh Road		
246	Armadale Station	Hilbert	Forrest Road and Daintree Street		
249	Armadale Station	Hilbert	Wungong Road and Rowley Road		
250	Armadale Station	Wungong	Harber Drive		
251	Armadale Station	Byford Station	South Western Highway		
254	Byford Station	Byford Station	Mead Street, Kardan Boulevard and Indigo Parkway		
255	Byford Station	Byford Station	Indigo Parkway, Kardan Boulevard and Mead Street		
256	Byford Station	Byford Station	Kokoda Boulevard		
259	Byford Station	Mundijong	South Western Highway and Soldiers Road		
262	Byford Station	Jarrahdale	South Western Highway, Soldiers Road and Jarrahdale Road	(Note: Selected Route 262 services terminate at Jarrahdale General Store)	
270	Elizabeth Quay	High Wycombe Station	Belmont Forum Shopping Centre and Kewdale	(Note: Selected Route 270 services terminate on Hale Road after Cypress Road in Forrestfield)	
271	High Wycombe Station	Forrestfield	Bougainvillea Avenue and Anderson Road		
273	Kalamunda Bus Station	Kalamunda	Cotherstone Road		
274	Kalamunda Bus Station	Gooseberry Hill	Peoples Avenue		
275	High Wycombe Station	Walliston	Kalamunda Road and Kalamunda Bus Station		
276	High Wycombe Station	Kalamunda Bus Station	Gooseberry Hill		
277	High Wycombe Station	Midland Station	Newburn Road and Midland Road		
278	High Wycombe Station	Midland Station	Wittenoom Road and Abernethy Road	(Note: Selected Route 278 services deviate via High Wycombe Shopping Centre)	
279	Kalamunda Bus Station	Maddington Central	Kelvin Road		
280	High Wycombe Station	Westfield Carousel	Forrestfield, Wattle Grove, Gerald Street and Cannington Station	(Note: Selected Route 280 services terminate at Cannington Station)	
281	Forrestfield	Lesmurdie	Wattle Grove		
282	Oats Street Station	Kalamunda Bus Station	Welshpool Road and Grove Road		
283	Oats Street Station	Kalamunda Bus Station	Welshpool Road and Lesmurdie Road		
284	Curtin University Bus Station	Belmont Forum Shopping Centre	Carlisle Station and Albany Highway	(Note: Selected Route 284 services deviate via Harold Hawthorne Community Centre; selected services terminate at Curtin Central Bus Station)	
285	Oats Street Station	Kewdale	Orrong Road	(Note: Selected Route 285 services deviate via Kurnall Road, Welshpool; selected services depart from Belmont Forum and terminate at Pilbara Street before Orrong Road, Welshpool)	
290	Redcliffe Station	Midland Station	Guildford		
291	Redcliffe Station	Midland Station	South Guildford		
292	Redcliffe Station	Perth Airport T3 and T4			
293	Redcliffe Station	High Wycombe Station	Great Eastern Highway and Belmont Forum Shopping Centre	(Note: Selected Route 293 services terminate on Abernethy Road, Cloverdale (near Belmont Forum))	
294	High Wycombe Station	Foodbank WA	Abernethy Road		

=== 300–399 ===
Route	From	To	Via	Variations	Refs
300	Midland Station	Midland Gate Shopping Centre	The Crescent		
301	Midland Station	Midland Hospital	Yelverton Drive		
307	Midland Station	Kalamunda Bus Station	Military Road		
308	Midland Station	Viveash	(Circular service)		
310	Midland Station	Ellenbrook Station	Great Northern Highway and Millhouse Road	(Note: Selected Route 310 services terminate on Great Northern Highway before Copley Road, Upper Swan)	
312	Midland Station	Baskerville	Herne Hill	(Note: Selected Route 312 services terminate on Toodyay Road near James Road, Stratton)	
313	Midland Station	Jane Brook	Morisson Road and Talbot Road		
314	Midland Station	Jane Brook	Talbot Road and Morrison Road	(Note: Selected Route 314 services terminate at Midland TAFE; selected services terminate on Tablot Road near Morrision Road, Swan View)	
315	Midland Station	Stratton	Blackadder Road and Morrison Road	(Note: Selected Route 315 services terminate on Myles Road near Morrision Road, Swan View; selected services terminate on Stratton Boulevard near O'Connor Road, Stratton)	
320	Midland Station	Mundaring	Great Eastern Highway	(Note: Selected Route 320 services extend to Yallambee Retirement Village; selected services extend to Sawyers Valley; selected services extend to Chidlow; selected services do not deviate via Strettle Street; selected services deviate via Parkerville)	
321	Midland Station	Glen Forrest	Hillsden Road and Darlington Road	(Note: Selected Route 321 services extend to Parkerville and then Mundaring; selected services deviate via Strettle Road (Mahogany Creek))	
322	Midland Station	Glen Forrest	Clayton Street and Coulston Road	(Note: Selected Route 322 services deviate via Lionel Road, Darlington; selected services terminate on Scott Street, before Marriott Road, in Boya; selected services extend to Mundaring)	
323	Midland Station	Swan View	Morrison Road		
324	Midland Station	Jane Brook	Morrison Road and Talbot Road	(Note: Selected Route 324 services terminate at O'Connor Road near Farrall Road, Stratton)	
325	Midland Station	Stratton	Morrison Road and Blackadder Road	(Note: Selected Route 325 services terminate at O'Connor Road near Farrall Road, Stratton)	
326	Midland Station	Midvale	Victoria Parade		
327	Midland Station	Swan View	Morrison Road and Marlboro Road		
328	Midland Station	Chidlow	Great Eastern Highway, Parkerville and Mount Helena	(Note: Selected Route 328 services extend to Wooroloo; selected services extend to Wundowie; selected services do not deviate via Old York Road in Greenmount; selected services deviate via Homestead Road, Strettle Road and Brooking Road)	
331	Mundaring	Wundowie	Stoneville and Mount Helena	(Note: Selected Route 331 services terminate in Chidlow; selected services terminate on Keane Street before Sawyers Road, Mount Helena)	
340	Ellenbrook Station	Ellenbrook (Annies Landing Estate)	The Broadway		
341	Ellenbrook Station	Ellenbrook (Malvern Springs Estate)	Brookmount Drive		
342	Ellenbrook Station	Ellenbrook (Malvern Springs Estate)	Westgrove Drive		
343	Ellenbrook Station	Aveley Secondary College	Millhouse Road and Holdsworth Avenue		
345	Ellenbrook Station	Bullsbrook Town Centre	Millhouse Road and Great Northern Highway		
346	Ellenbrook Station	Aveley	Bronzewing Avenue, Flecker Promenade and Hancock Avenue		
347	Ellenbrook Station	Whiteman Park Station	Partridge Street and Woodlake Boulevard	(Note: Selected Route 347 services terminate on Starflower Road before Henley Street, Henley Brook)	
348	Ellenbrook Station	Henley Brook	Amethyst Parkway and Henley Brook Avenue		
349	Ellenbrook Station	Whiteman Park Station	West Swan Road and Gnangara Road		
350	Mirrabooka Bus Station	Caversham	Cherrywood Avenue, Benara Road and Noranda Station		
351	Galleria Bus Station	Ballajura Station	Crimea Street, Malaga Drive and Bellefin Drive	(Note: Selected Route 351 services deviate via Workpower (Malaga))	
352	Galleria Bus Station	Morley Station	McGilvray Avenue, Benara Road and Emberson Road		
353	Galleria Bus Station	Ballajura Station	Morley Station and Beechboro Road North		
354	Galleria Bus Station	Ballajura Station	Morley Station, Bottlebrush Drive and Amazon Drive		
355	Galleria Bus Station	Whiteman Park Station	Collier Road, Bassendean Station and Altone Road		
356	Galleria Bus Station	Ballajura Station	Morley Station, Bassendean Station, Sturtridge Road and Bennett Springs Drive	(Note: Selected Route 356 services terminate on Sturtridge Road after Benara Road, Lockridge; selected services terminate at Bassendean Station)	
357	Bassendean Station	Whiteman Park Station	Suffolk Street and Arthur Street		
358	Midland Station	Whiteman Park Station	Reid Highway and Arthur Street		
359	Midland Station	Whiteman Park Station	Reid Highway and West Swan Road		
360	Perth Busport	Alexander Heights Shopping Centre	Alexander Drive, Illawarra Crescent North and The Avenue		
361	Galleria Bus Station	Alexander Heights Shopping Centre	Alexander Drive and Illawarra Crescent		
362	Mirrabooka Bus Station	Ballajura Station	Alexander Drive, Cassowary Drive and Guadalupe Drive	(Note: Selected Route 362 services terminate on Cassowary Drive after Weir Road, Ballajura)	
363	Mirrabooka Bus Station	Ballajura Station	Victoria Road and Beringarra Avenue	(Note: Selected Route 363 services deviate via Workpower (Malaga))	
371	Mirrabooka Bus Station	Flinders Square	Nollamara Shopping Centre and Flinders Street		
374	Mirrabooka Bus Station	Whitfords Station	Balga Plaza and Madeley	(Note: Selected Route 374 services deviate via Newpark Shopping Centre; selected services terminate on Evandale Road before Hepburn Avenue, Darch)	
375	Mirrabooka Bus Station	Alexander Heights	Walderton Avenue and Hainsworth Avenue	(Note: Selected Route 375 services deviate via Bloodwood Drive, Marangaroo; selected services deviate via Whitehaven Crescent, Balga)	
377	Mirrabooka Bus Station	Alexander Heights	Koondoola		
384	Perth Busport	Mirrabooka Bus Station	Wanneroo Road and Nollamara Shopping Centre		
386	Perth Busport	Kingsway City Shopping Centre	Wanneroo Road and Balga Plaza	(Note: Selected Route 386 services deviate via Newpark Shopping Centre and Templeton Crescent, Girrawheen)	
386X	Perth Busport	Kingsway City Shopping Centre	Wanneroo Road and Balga Plaza		
388	Perth Busport	Warwick Station	Wanneroo Road and Beach Road		
389	Perth Busport	Wanneroo	Wanneroo Road		
390	Joondalup Station	Banksia Grove	Tapping	(Note: Selected Route 390 services deviate via Viridian Drive, Banksia Grove)	
391	Joondalup Station	Banksia Grove	Carramar		

=== 400–499 ===
Route	From	To	Via	Variations	Refs
402	Perth Busport	Stirling Station	Loftus Street and Main Street		
403	Perth Busport	Stirling Station	Loftus Street and Tuart Hill	(Note: Selected Route 403 services terminate on Royal Street after Main Street)	
404	Perth Busport	Osborne Park	Loftus Street and McDonald Street		
406	Glendalough Station	ECU Mount Lawley	Walcott Street		
407	Glendalough Station	Herdsman Park	Glendalough		
410	Stirling Station	Karrinyup Bus Station	Steward Street, Scarborough Beach Bus Station, Perth Parade and Duke Street	(Note: Selected Route 410 services terminate on Scarborough Beach Bus Station)	
412	Stirling Station	Karrinyup Bus Station	Woodlands Village, Cobb Street, Scarborough Beach Bus Station, Perth Parade and Duke Street	(Note: Selected Route 412 services terminate on Scarborough Beach Bus Station)	
413	Stirling Station	Glendalough Station	Osborne Park		
414	Stirling Station	Glendalough Station	Balcatta and Main Street		
415	Stirling Station	Mirrabooka Bus Station	Amelia Street		
416	Warwick Station	Mirrabooka Bus Station	Eglinton Crescent and Balcatta Road		
420: Surf CAT	Stirling Station	Scarborough Beach Bus Station	Ellen Stirling Boulevard and Scarborough Beach Road		
421	Stirling Station	Scarborough Beach Bus Station	Sackville Terrace		
422	Stirling Station	Scarborough Beach Bus Station	Karrinyup Bus Station	(Note: Selected Route 422 services terminate at Karrinyup Bus Station)	
423	Stirling Station	Warwick Station	Karrinyup Bus Station and Hillarys Boat Harbour	(Note: Selected Route 423 services terminate at Hillarys Boat Harbour; selected services terminate at North Beach Shopping Centre)	
424	Stirling Station	Karrinyup Bus Station	North Beach Road	(Note: Selected Route 424 services deviate via Meath Retirement Village)	
425	Stirling Station	Warwick Station	Karrinyup Bus Station and Carine	(Note: Selected Route 425 services deviate via Charles Riley Road; selected services terminate at Karrinyup Bus Station)	
427	Stirling Station	Warwick Station	North Beach Road and Erindale Road		
428	Stirling Station	Warwick Station	Balcatta	(Note: Selected Route 428 services terminate on Jones Street near Eversley Street)	
441	Warwick Station	Whitfords Station	Seacrest Drive and Whitfords City Shopping Centre	(Note: Selected Route 441 services terminate on Seacrest Drive near Hepburn Avenue, Sorrento)	
442	Warwick Station	Whitfords Station	Waterford Drive and Whitfords City Shopping Centre	(Note: Selected Route 442 services terminate on Orbell Road near Hepburn Avenue, Hillarys)	
443	Warwick Station	Whitfords Station	Giles Avenue		
444	Warwick Station	Whitfords Station	Gibson Avenue	(Note: Selected Route 444 services deviate via Glengary Homes)	
445	Warwick Station	Whitfords Station	Coolibah Drive		
446	Warwick Station	Whitfords Station	Allenswood Road	(Note: Selected Route 446 services deviate via Keith Simpson Homes)	
447	Warwick Station	Whitfords Station	Cockman Road and Moolanda Boulevard		
448	Warwick Station	Kingsway City	Blackmore Avenue and Giralt Road		
449	Warwick Station	Ballajura Station	Beach Road	(Note: Selected Route 449 services deviate via Workpower (Malaga))	
450	Warwick Station	Ballajura Station	Kingsway City Shopping Centre, Kingsway and Alexander Drive		
451	Warwick Station	Ballajura Station	Marangaroo Drive, Alexander Heights Shopping Centre and Illawarra Crescent	(Note: Selected Route 451 services deviate from Illawarra Crescent to terminate on Marangaroo Drive after Lakeshore Close, Ballajura; selected services terminate at Alexander Heights Shopping Centre)	
452	Whitfords Station	Ballajura Station	Gnangara Road, Alexander Heights Shopping Centre and Marangaroo Drive	(Note: Selected Route 452 services terminate at Alexander Heights Shopping Centre)	
455	Whitfords Station	Ellenbrook Station	Prindiville Drive and Gnangara Road	(Note: Selected Route 455 services terminate on Gnangara Road after Sydney Road, Gnangara)	
460	Whitfords Station	Joondalup Station	Oceanside Promenade and Shenton Avenue	(Note: Selected Route 460 services terminate on Venturi Drive before Ocean Reef Road, Ocean Reef)	
461	Whitfords Station	Joondalup Station	Dampier Avenue, Marmion Avenue and Shenton Avenue	(Note: Selected Route 461 services terminate on Damper Avenue near Koorana Road, Mullaloo)	
462	Whitfords Station	Joondalup Station	Bridgewater Drive, Marmion Avenue and Hodges Drive		
463	Whitfords Station	Joondalup Station	Gradient Way and Poseidon Road		
464	Whitfords Station	Joondalup Station	Eddystone Avenue and Caridean Street		
465	Whitfords Station	Joondalup Station	Trappers Drive and Joondalup Drive	(Note: Selected Route 465 services deviate via Timberside Villas)	
466	Whitfords Station	Joondalup Station	Timberlane Drive and Edgewater Drive		
467	Whitfords Station	Joondalup Station	Chatsworth Drive, San Teodoro Avenue, Waldburg Drive and Joondalup Drive	(Note: Selected Route 467 services terminate at Wanneroo Shopping Centre)	
468	Whitfords Station	Joondalup Station	Wanneroo Road and Joondalup Drive		
470	Joondalup Station	Burns Beach	Shenton Avenue and Delgado Parade		
471	Joondalup Station	Burns Beach	Moore Drive and Marmion Avenue		
473	Joondalup Station	Kinross	Blue Mountain Drive and Kinross Drive		
474	Joondalup Station	Clarkson Station	Blue Mountain Drive and Marmion Avenue		
479	Clarkson Station	Mindarie Marina	Aviator Boulevard	(Note: Selected Route 479 services deviate via Ocean Keys Shopping Centre)	
480	Clarkson Station	Quinns Rocks	Rothesay Heights and Quinns Road		
481	Clarkson Station	Butler Station	Marmion Avenue and Santa Barbara Parade		
482	Clarkson Station	Butler Station	Marmion Avenue		
483	Clarkson Station	Butler Station	Renshaw Boulevard, Baltimore Parade and Camborne Parkway	(Note: Selected Route 483 services deviate via Hughie Edwards Drive, Merriwa; selected services terminate on Hester Avenue after Baltimore Parade, Clarkson)	
484	Clarkson Station	Butler Station	Connolly Drive and Shepperton Drive	(Note: Selected Route 484 services terminate on Ridgewood Boulevard near Vanderlin Crescent, Ridgewood)	
485	Butler Station	Alkimos Station	Mirabilis Avenue		
486	Butler Station	Alkimos Station	Marmion Avenue		
487	Butler Station	Alkimos (Trinity Estate)	Santorini Promenade and Piazza Link		
488	Butler Station	Alkimos (Trinity Estate)	Benenden Avenue		
491	Alkimos Station	Eglinton Station	Heath Avenue		
492	Alkimos Station	Eglinton Station	Marmion Avenue		
494	Eglinton Station	Yanchep Station	Marmion Avenue	(Note: Selected Route 494 services deviate via Yanchep Lagoon; selected services terminate on Marmion Avenue after Lagoon Drive, Yanchep)	
495	Eglinton Station	Yanchep Station	Marmion Avenue and Brazier Road		
496	Eglinton Station	Yanchep Station	Marmion Avenue and Saint Andrews Drive	(Note: Selected Route 496 services terminate on Marmion Avenue after Lagoon Drive, Yanchep)	
498	Yanchep Station	Two Rocks	Two Rocks Road	(Note: Selected Route 498 services deviate via Two Rocks Shopping Centre)	

=== 500–599 ===
Route	From	To	Via	Variations	Refs
500	Bull Creek Station	Booragoon Bus Station	Bateman Road and Canning Avenue		
502	Bull Creek Station	Fremantle Station	Leach Hwy and White Gum Valley		
503	Bull Creek Station	Murdoch Station	Winthrop Drive and Gilbertson Road		
504	Bull Creek Station	Murdoch Station	Jackson Avenue and Prescott Drive		
505	Bull Creek Station	Murdoch Station	Dean Road and Murdoch Drive		
510	Murdoch Station	Booragoon Bus Station	Murdoch Drive and Riseley Street		
511	Murdoch Station	Fremantle Station	Somerville Boulevard and Winterfold Road	(Note: Selected Route 511 services terminate on Winterfold Road after Stock Road, Samson)	
512	Murdoch Station	Fremantle Station	Romeo Road and Phoenix Park Shopping Centre	(Note: Selected Route 512 services terminate Spearwood Avenue after Hamilton Road in Spearwood)	
513	Murdoch Station	Fremantle Station	South Street and Cordelia Avenue	(Note: Selected Route 513 services deviate via Rinaldo Crescent, Coolbellup; selected services deviate via Romeo Road, Coolbellup; selected services terminate at Kardinya Park Shopping Centre)	
514	Murdoch Station	Cockburn Central Station	Murdoch Drive, Bibra Lake and North Lake Road		
515	Murdoch Station	Jandakot	Farrington Road and Berrigan Drive	(Note: Selected Route 515 services deviate via Jandakot Airport)	
516	Murdoch Station	Willetton	Casserley Drive, McGuiness Drive and Pinetree Gully Road	(Note: Selected Route 516 services deviate via Jandakot Airport; selected services terminate on Beasley Road before South Street, Leeming)	
517	Murdoch TAFE Campus	Thornlie Station	Murdoch Station, Ranford Road Station and Balfour Street	(Note: Selected Route 517 services terminate on Castlewood Parkway after Edencourt Drive, Southern River; selected services terminate at Murdoch Station; selected services terminate on Gay Street near Southern River Road, Huntingdale)	
518	Murdoch TAFE Campus	Cockburn Central Station	Murdoch Station, Ranford Road Station, Harrisdale and Piara Waters	(Note: Selected Route 518 services terminate on Wright Road near Bordeaux Parade, Piara Waters; selected services terminate at Ranford Road Station; selected services terminate at Murdoch Station)	
519	Murdoch TAFE Campus	Armadale Station	Murdoch Station, Ranford Road Station and Piara Waters	(Note: Selected Route 519 services terminate on Nicholson Road near Greywacke Entrance, Piara Waters; selected services terminate at Murdoch Station)	
520	Cockburn Central Station	Fremantle Station	North Lake Road, Forrest Road and Hampton Road	(Note: Selected Route 520 services terminate on Carrington Street before Rockingham Road, Hamilton Hill)	
523	Cockburn Central Station	Treeby	Clementine Boulevard		
525	Cockburn Central Station	Aubin Grove Station	Baningan Avenue		
526	Cockburn Central Station	Aubin Grove Station	Wentworth Parade	(Note: Selected Route 526 services deviate via Southern Cross Retirement Village)	
527	Cockburn Central Station	Aubin Grove Station	Atwell		
529	Cockburn Central Station	Armadale Station	Armadale Road		
530	Cockburn Central Station	Fremantle Station	Yangebup Road, Marvel Avenue and Rockingham Road		
531	Cockburn Central Station	Fremantle Station	Marvel Avenue and Rockingham Road	(Note: Selected Route 531 services deviate via Phoenix Shopping Centre)	
532	Cockburn Central Station	Fremantle Station	Beeliar Drive and Hamilton Road	(Note: Selected Route 532 services terminate on Hampton Road before Clontarf Road, South Fremantle; selected services terminate on Carrington Street before Forrest Road, Hamilton Hill)	
535	Aubin Grove Station	Hammond Park	Macquarie Boulevard		
536	Aubin Grove Station	Hammond Park	Barfield Road		
537	Aubin Grove Station	Wandi	Aubin Grove and Lyon Road		
540	Kwinana Station	Kwinana Bus Station	Orelia Avenue and Medina Avenue		
541	Kwinana Station	Wellard Station	Sulphur Road, Calista Avenue and Gilmore Avenue		
542	Kwinana Station	Wellard Station	Chisham Avenue and Wellard Road	(Note: Selected Route 542 services deviate via Parmelia Avenue)	
543	Kwinana Station	Kwinana Bus Station	Johnson Road and Challenger Avenue		
544	Kwinana Station	Wellard Station	Johnson Road and Lambeth Circle		
548	Rockingham Station	Fremantle Station	Patterson Road and Cockburn Road	(Note: Selected Route 548 services terminate on Cockburn Road near Magazine Court, Coogee)	
549	Fremantle Station	Rockingham Station	Gilmore Avenue Rockingham Road and Dixon Road	(Note: Selected Route 549 services terminate at Kwinana Bus Station)	
550	Rockingham Station	Rockingham Beach	Read Street and Kent Street		
551	Rockingham Station	Shoalwater	Goddard Street, Parkin Street and Safety Bay Road	(Note: Selected Route 551 services deviate via Arcadia Drive and Fifth Avenue)	
552	Rockingham Station	Shoalwater	Townsend Road and Safety Bay Road		
553	Rockingham Station	Shoalwater	Cygnus Street, Waikiki Road and Safety Bay Road		
554	Rockingham Station	Hillman	Calume Street		
555	Rockingham Station	Rockingham Foreshore	Goddard Street and Wanliss Street		
556	Rockingham Station	Rockingham General Hospital	Elanora Drive	(Note: Selected Route 556 services deviate via Wooramel Way and Sunningdale Circle)	
557	Rockingham Station	Warnbro Station	Charthouse Road	(Note: Selected Route 557 services deviate to travel from Read Street to Rae Road and do not travel via Rockingham Centre Shopping Centre)	
558	Rockingham Station	Warnbro Station	Read Street	(Note: Selected Route 558 services deviate to travel from Read Street to Rae Road and do not travel via Rockingham Centre Shopping Centre)	
559	Rockingham Station	Warnbro Station	Willmott Drive	(Note: Selected Route 559 services deviate to travel from Read Street to Rae Road and do not travel via Rockingham Centre Shopping Centre)	
560	Warnbro Station	Port Kennedy	Currie Street	(Note: Selected Route 560 services deviate via Warnbro Centre)	
561	Warnbro Station	Comet Bay College, Secret Harbour	Warnbro Sound Avenue and Secret Harbour Boulevard		
563	Warnbro Station	Secret Harbour	Warnbro Sound Avenue and Forty Road		
564	Warnbro Station	Baldivis (Ridge Boulevard)	Arpenteur Drive	(Note: Selected Route 564 services deviate via Ridge Boulevard to Wattlebird Way, Baldivis)	
565	Warnbro Station	Baldivis (Sixty Eight Road, The Dales)	Nairn Road	(Note: Selected Route 565 services deviate via Stockland Shopping Centre)	
566	Warnbro Station	Baldivis (Furiso Green)	Norwood Avenue and Hillsborough Avenue		
567	Warnbro Station	Baldivis (Sixty Eight Road, Brightwood Baldivis)	Grandis Drive and Heritage Park Drive		
568	Warnbro Station	Baldivis North	Norseman Approach and Birdsville Drive		
569	Warnbro Station	Baldivis (Daintree Street)	Lochern Road		
574	Warnbro Station	Lakelands Station	Warnbro Sound Avenue		
577	Lakelands Station	Lakelands Station	Dragonfly Boulevard		
584	Lakelands Station	Mandurah Station	Challenger Road, Mandurah Road, Mandurah Terrace, and Peel Street	(Note: Selected Route 584 services deviate via Dolphin Quay)	
585	Lakelands Station	Mandurah Station	Mandurah Road, and Park Road		
586	Lakelands Station	Mandurah Station	Pebble Beach Drive and Bortolo Drive	(Note: Selected Route 586 services deviate via Meadow Springs Boulevard Shopping Centre; selected services deviate via Lakelands Shopping Centre)	
588	Mandurah Station	Mandurah Foreshore	Mandurah		
589	Mandurah Station	Mandurah Foreshore	Mandurah		
591	Mandurah Station	Erskine	McLarty Road and Sticks Boulevard	(Note: Selected Route 591 services deviate via Bridgewater Village)	
592	Mandurah Station	Wannanup	Glencoe Parade		
593	Mandurah Station	Dawesville West	Mandurah Road and Old Coast Road		
594	Mandurah Station	Dawesville	Mandurah Road and Old Coast Road		
597	Mandurah Station	Coodanup	Coodanup Crescent and Beacham Street	(Note: Selected Route 597 services deviate via Hudson Drive / Mariners Cove, Dudley Park)	
598	Mandurah Station	Greenfields	Kookaburra Drive and Cambridge Drive	(Note: Selected Route 598 services extend to Furnissdale; selected services terminate at Peel Health Campus)	

=== 600–699 ===
Route	From	To	Via	Variations	Refs
600	Mandurah Station	Pinjarra	Pinjarra Road	(Note: Selected Route 600 services deviate via Inlet Boulevard, South Yunderup)	
604	Mandurah Station	South Yunderup	Pinjarra Road and North Yunderup		
605	Mandurah Station	Pinjarra	Pinjarra Road, Ravenswood and Murray River Estate		

=== 900–999 ===
Route	From	To	Via	Variations	Refs
910	Perth Busport	Fremantle Station	Canning Highway		
915	Bull Creek Station	Fremantle Station	Booragoon Bus Station		
920	Canning Bridge Station	Cannington Station	Curtin University Bus Station, Kent Street and Manning Road	(Note: Selected Route 920 terminate at Curtin University Bus Station)	
925	Bull Creek Station	Cannington Station	Southlands Boulevarde Shopping Centre and Metcalfe Road	(Note: Selected Route 925 terminate on Hossack Avenue after Lyndale Avenue, Parkwood)	
930	Elizabeth Quay	Thornlie Station	Shepperton Road, Albany Highway, Westfield Carousel, and Spencer Road		
930X	Elizabeth Quay	Thornlie Station	Shepperton Road and Albany Highway		
935	Kings Park	Redcliffe Station	Kooyong Road and Belmont Forum Shopping Centre	(Note: Selected Route 935 services terminate on Malcolm Street (Parliament House); selected services terminate on Belvidere Street, before Leake Street in Belmont)	
940	Elizabeth Quay	Redcliffe Station	Great Eastern Highway		
950	Queen Elizabeth II Medical Centre	Morley Station	UWA, Elizabeth Quay Bus Station and Beaufort Street	(Note: Selected services terminate on Hampden Road after Stirling Highway; selected services terminate at Galleria Bus Station)	
950X	Queen Elizabeth II Medical Centre	Morley Station	UWA, Elizabeth Quay Bus Station and Beaufort Street		
960	Mirrabooka Bus Station	Curtin University Bus Station	Alexander Drive, Perth Busport and Wellington Street	(Note: Selected Route 960 services terminate at Edith Cowan University - Mount Lawley)	
970	Perth Busport	Landsdale	Flinders Street, Mirrabooka Bus Station and Mirrabooka Avenue	(Note: Selected Route 970 services terminate at Mirrabooka Bus Station)	
970X	Perth Busport	Landsdale	Flinders Street, Mirrabooka Bus Station and Mirrabooka Avenue		
975	Bayswater Station	Warwick Station	Galleria Bus Station and Mirrabooka Bus Station		
980	Elizabeth Quay	Galleria Bus Station	William Street and Walter Road		
990	Perth Busport	Scarborough Beach Bus Station	Scarborough Beach Road and Glendalough station	(Note: Selected Route 990 services terminate at Glendalough Station)	
995	Elizabeth Quay	Claremont Station	Mounts Bay Road and Stirling Highway		
996: CircleRoute	Fremantle Station	Stirling Station	University of Western Australia and Shenton Park	(Note: Selected Route 996 services commence or terminate at stops other than Fremantle Station)	
997: CircleRoute	Stirling Station	Galleria Bus Station	Dianella Plaza		
998: CircleRoute	Galleria Bus Station	Curtin University Bus Station	Bayswater, Belmont Forum and Oats Street	(Note: Selected Route 998 services commence or terminate at stops other than Curtin University Bus Station)	
999: CircleRoute	Curtin University Bus Station	Fremantle Station	Southlands Boulevarde, Murdoch and Murdoch University	(Note: Selected Route 999 services commence or terminate at stops other than Curtin University Bus Station or Fremantle Station)	

=== Special services ===
Transperth operates bus routes servicing special events such as sport matches and concerts. These may include regular bus services, which may operate with larger capacity buses or with additional trips, or special routes for the events. For example, nib Stadium is serviced by regular Beaufort Street and Lord Street routes, while Subiaco Oval had special events routes (now no longer running, due to the closure of the oval). Ten special events routes have been introduced to service the new Perth Stadium. Special event service routes are numbered in the 600s. Some routes operating as TransRegional towards some TransPerth facilities also may be numbered in the 600s; such as route 645.

Crown Perth operates a "Crown Bus" service from various metropolitan destinations to the Burswood casino complex. Most routes depart from or pass through bus stations, with a morning trip to the casino and a return trip in the afternoon. These routes are also numbered in the 600s, and appear on Transperth station maps and bus stands.

Various "School Special" services are numbered in the 700s. Other school services operate as variations of standard Transperth services.

Train and ferry replacement bus services are numbered in the 900s, and operate when those services are interrupted. When only part of a train line is closed, the replacement buses will operate between the nearest open stations. As of October 2016, buses replacing Perth Station services depart from Perth Busport; previously, they departed from Roe Street bus station. Private operators such as Buswest may be used if there are insufficient Transperth-branded buses available, such as when unscheduled disruptions occur during peak periods.

Recurrent special event services and replacement bus services
Route	From	To	Notes	Refs
618	Joondalup Station	Arena Joondalup		
620	Perth Busport	Kings Park	ANZAC Day service	
621	Vietnam War Memorial	Kings Park (coach terminal near Wadjuk Way)	ANZAC Day service	
622	Cannington Station	Sam Kerr Football Centre		
623	Perth Busport	Sam Kerr Football Centre		
624	Perth Busport	City Beach Oval	City To Surf Event Service	
624B	City Beach Oval	Floreat Forum Shop Ctr	City To Surf Event Service	
645	Waroona	Halls Head Shopping Centre	via Coolup, Pinjarra and Mandurah	
650	Karrinyup Bus Station	Optus Stadium	via Innaloo	
651	Armadale Station	Optus Stadium	via Shepperton Road, Sevenoaks Street and Albany Highway	
652	Mirrabooka Bus Station	Optus Stadium	via Alexander Drive	
653	Galleria Bus Station	Optus Stadium	via Beaufort Street	
654	Bassendean Station	Optus Stadium	via Great Eastern Highway	
655	Kalamunda Bus Station	Optus Stadium	via Belmont & Forrestfield	
656	Canning Vale	Optus Stadium	via Bentley Plaza	
657	Curtin University Bus Station	Optus Stadium	via Victoria Park Central and Curtin Central Bus Station	
658	Hamilton Hill	Optus Stadium	via Kardinya Park	
659	Fremantle	Optus Stadium	via Canning Highway	
660	Cannington Station	Optus Stadium	via Shepperton Road and Sevenoaks Street	
673	Noranda	HBF Park	via Galleria Bus Station	
674	Aveley	HBF Park	via Ellenbrook town centre	
676	Canning Vale	HBF Park	via Vahland Avenue	
680	Quinns Rocks	Crown Perth	via Karrinyup Bus Station	
681	Joondalup Station	Crown Perth	via Stirling Station	
682	Bull Creek Station	Crown Perth		
683	Alexander Heights	Crown Perth	via Bassendean Station	
684	Swan View	Crown Perth	via Midland Station and Bassendean Station	
685	Kalamunda Bus Station	Crown Perth		
686	Armadale Station	Crown Perth	via Kelmscott Station	
687	Cockburn Central Station	Crown Perth		
688	Fremantle Station	Crown Perth	via Booragoon Bus Station	
689	Rockingham Station	Crown Perth	via Kwinana Bus station	
690	Ellenbrook	Crown Perth		
691	Elizabeth Quay Bus Station	Crown Perth		
692	Mandurah – south	Crown Perth		
693	Mandurah – north	Crown Perth		
695	Wanneroo	Crown Perth	via Mirrabooka Bus station	
696	Dianella	Crown Perth	via Galleria Bus station	
900	Elizabeth Quay Bus Station	South Perth	Replaces Elizabeth Quay Jetty–Mends Street Jetty ferry services	
901	Perth Busport^{†}	Midland station^{†}	Replaces Midland Line train services	
902	Perth Busport^{†}	High Wycombe station^{†}	Replaces Airport Line train services	
903	Perth Busport^{†}	Ellenbrook station^{†}	Replaces Ellenbrook Line train services	
904	Perth Busport^{†}	Yanchep station^{†}	Replaces Yanchep Line train services	
906	Perth Busport^{†}	Fremantle station^{†}	Replaces Fremantle Line train services	
907	Perth Busport^{†}	Byford Station^{†}	Replaces Armadale Line train services	
908	Perth Busport^{†}	Cockburn Central Station^{†}	Replaces Thornlie-Cockburn Line Train services	
909	Perth Busport^{†}	Mandurah station^{†}	Replaces Mandurah Line train services	
944	Perth Busport	Whitfords Station	Express Service - Replaces Yanchep Line train services	
949	Perth Busport	Aubin Grove Station	Express Service - Replaces Mandurah Line train services	
^{†} Replacement buses operate between the nearest open stations for partial line closures

== Renumbered and withdrawn bus routes ==
The following bus routes underwent route renumbering or service withdrawal since 2011:

Route	From	To	Via	Renumbered to	Effective date	Ref.
529	Armadale Station	Cockburn Central Station		Withdrawn	8 May 2011 (last service 6 May 2011)	
64	Galleria bus station	Warwick Station	Mirrabooka Bus Station	371	3 July 2011	
80	Floreat	Wellington Street Bus Station	Cambridge Road	Withdrawn, replaced by route 81	14 August 2011	
85	City Beach	East Perth		Withdrawn, replaced by route 84	14 August 2011	
95	Wembley Downs	East Perth		Withdrawn, replaced by route 92	14 August 2011	
267	Karrinyup bus station	Scarborough Beach		422	14 August 2011	
276	Wellington Street bus station	Osborne Park	Tuart Hill	403	14 August 2011	
277	Wellington Street bus station	Osborne Park	Tuart Hill	404	14 August 2011	
278	Wellington Street bus station	Osborne Park	Tuart Hill	Withdrawn, replaced by routes 403 and 404	14 August 2011	
346	Wanneroo	Wellington Street Bus Station	Wanneroo Road	389	6 November 2011	
347	Warwick Station	Wellington Street Bus Station		Withdrawn, replaced by routes 387, 388 and 449	6 November 2011	
363	Kingsway City Shopping Centre	Wellington Street Bus Station	Girrawheen Avenue	Withdrawn, replaced by route 365 and 386	6 November 2011	
373	Kingsway City Shopping Centre	Wellington Street Bus Station	Templeton Crescent	386	6 November 2011	
435	Warwick railway station	Stirling Station	Carine	Withdrawn, replaced by route 425	6 November 2011	
452	Whitfords Station	Warwick Station	Marmion Avenue	Withdrawn, partly replaced by routes 442 and 443	6 November 2011	
455	Whitfords Station	Warwick Station	Blackall Drive	Withdrawn, partly replaced by routes 445 and 446	6 November 2011	
457	Whitfords Station	Warwick Station	Moolanda Boulevard	Withdrawn, partly replaced by routes 447 and 449	6 November 2011	
590	Mandurah station	Mandurah Foreshore		Withdrawn, replaced by routes 588 and 589	18 December 2011	
44	Esplanade Busport	Bayswater		Withdrawn	11 November 2012	
84	Wellington Street bus station	City Beach	The Boulevard	82	3 February 2013	
91	Wembley Downs	East Perth	Empire Avenue	83	3 February 2013	
401	Stirling Station	Wellington Street Bus Station		Withdrawn, partly replaced by route 85	3 February 2013	
456	Greenwood Station	Kingsway City Shopping Centre		Withdrawn	21 April 2013	
205	Booragoon bus station	Cannington station	High Road, Riverton Forum and Bull Creek station	200	5 May 2013	
214	Huntingdale	Thornlie Station	Matilda Street	Withdrawn, merged into route 517	5 May 2013	
140	Fremantle Station	Booragoon bus station	Willagee	Withdrawn, merged into route 160 short trips	27 October 2013	
21	Esplanade Busport	Galleria bus station	Beaufort Street and Collier Road	Withdrawn, replaced by routes 348 and 950	27 Jan 2014	
22	Esplanade Busport	Galleria bus station	Beaufort Street	Withdrawn, merged into route 950 short trips	27 Jan 2014	
78	Esplanade Busport	University of Western Australia	Mounts Bay Road	Withdrawn, merged into route 950 short trips	27 Jan 2014	
79	Esplanade Busport	Queen Elizabeth II Medical Centre	University of Western Australia and Mounts Bay Road	Withdrawn, merged into route 950 short trips	27 Jan 2014	
47	Esplanade Busport	Bayswater	Guildford Road and Lord Street	Withdrawn, replaced by route 48	27 Jan 2014	
213	Wellington Street bus station	Westfield Carousel	Albany Highway	Withdrawn, merged into route 220 short trips	27 Jan 2014	
92	Roe Street bus station	Wembley Downs	Cambridge Street, Grantham Street and Hale Road	84	2 March 2014	
400	Roe Street bus station	Scarborough Beach	Scarborough Beach Road and Glendalough station	990	4 May 2014	
408	Glendalough station	Scarborough Beach	Scarborough Beach Road	990	4 May 2014	
426	Stirling Station	Karrinyup Bus Station	Huntriss Road	Withdrawn, merged into route 422 short trips	4 May 2014	
456	Greenwood Station	Hillarys Boat Harbour	Hepburn Avenue	Withdrawn	4 May 2014	
43	Esplanade Busport	Bayswater	Lord Street and Maylands	Withdrawn	7 Sep 2014	
52	Galleria bus station	Midland station	Benara Road and West Swan Road	349	7 Sep 2014	
58	Galleria bus station	Noranda	Emberson Road	346	7 Sep 2014	
65	Galleria bus station	Noranda	Emberson Road	347	7 Sep 2014	
86	Roe Street bus station	Gregory Street	Cambridge St and Ruislip St	Withdrawn	12 Oct 2014	
533	Cockburn Central Station	Fremantle Station	Yangebup Road and Marvell Avenue	Withdrawn	12 Oct 2014	
583	Mandurah station	Silver Sands	Peel Street	Withdrawn, replaced by route 584	12 Oct 2014	
850	Maddington station	Murdoch University	Amherst Road and Murdoch station	204	12 Oct 2014	
851	Maddington station	Murdoch University	Bridge Road and Murdoch station	205	12 Oct 2014	
281	Kalamunda bus station	Pickering Brook	Bickley	Withdrawn	21 Dec 2014	
200	Booragoon bus station	Cannington station	High Road, Riverton Forum and Bull Creek station	Withdrawn	1 Feb 2015	
374	Roe Street bus station	Kingsway City Shopping Centre	Walcott Street and Templeton Crescent	Withdrawn	1 Feb 2015	
375	Mirrabooka bus station	Marangaroo	Nollamara Avenue and Girrawheen Avenue	Withdrawn	1 Feb 2015	
332	Mundaring	Mundaring	Great Eastern Highway and Grenville Road (Clockwise circular service)	Withdrawn	1 Mar 2015	
458	Scarborough Beach	Whitfords station	West Coast Drive and Hillarys Boat Harbour	Withdrawn	1 Mar 2015	
17	Roe Street bus station	Galleria bus station	Alexander Drive and Light Street	Withdrawn, partly replaced by routes 19 and 20	3 May 2015	
348	Galleria bus station	Bayswater	Irwin Road and Langley Road	Withdrawn, replaced by route 48	9 Aug 2015	
104	Esplanade Busport	Como	Canning Highway	Withdrawn, replaced by route 910	13 Oct 2015	
105	Esplanade Busport	Applecross	Canning Highway	910	13 Oct 2015	
106	Esplanade Busport	Fremantle station	Canning Highway	910	13 Oct 2015	
449	Warwick station	Warwick Grove	Eglinton Crescent	Withdrawn	31 January 2016	
521	Murdoch station	Fiona Stanley Hospital		Withdrawn, replaced by routes 516, 517, 518 and 519	31 January 2016	
98	Fremantle station	Fremantle station	CircleRoute clockwise via University of Western Australia and Shenton Park, Stirling, Galleria, Bayswater, Oats Street, Curtin University, Murdoch stations	998	31 January 2016	
99	Fremantle station	Fremantle station	CircleRoute anticlockwise via Murdoch, Curtin University, Oats Street, Bayswater, Galleria, Stirling, Shenton Park stations and University of Western Australia	999	31 January 2016	
381	Karrinyup bus station	Fremantle	Scarborough Beach, West Coast Highway, City Beach and Cottesloe Beach	Withdrawn	23 May 2016	
37	Kings Park	Perth Airport Terminals 3 & 4	Great Eastern Highway, Kooyong Road, Belmont Forum Shopping Centre, Belvidere Street & Second Street	935	7 August 2016	
825	Fremantle Station	Rockingham Station	Cockburn Road and Patterson Road	548	7 August 2016	
920	Fremantle Station	Rockingham Station	Rockingham Road and Kwinana Town Centre (limited stops)	549	7 August 2016	
14	The Mezz Mount Hawthorn	Brady Street Mount Hawthorn	Kalgoorlie Street, Egina Street and Tasman Street	Withdrawn	19 August 2016	
354	Perth Busport	Mirrabooka bus station	Charles Street, Flinders Street and Nollamara Shopping Centre	Withdrawn, partly replaced by route 384	9 October 2016	
870	Perth Busport	Mirrabooka bus station	Flinders Street and Nollamara Avenue (limited stops)	970	9 October 2016	
881	Esplanade Busport	Munster	Booragoon Bus Station (limited stops)	114	9 October 2016	
885	Perth Busport	ECU Mount Lawley	Fitzgerald Street (limited stops)	960	9 October 2016	
888	Perth Busport	Mirrabooka bus station	Fitzgerald Street and Alexander Drive (limited stops)	960	9 October 2016	
886	Perth Busport	Alexander Heights	Fitzgerald Street, Alexander Drive and Illawarra Crescent South (limited stops)	360	9 October 2016	
887	Perth Busport	Alexander Heights	Fitzgerald Street, Alexander Drive and Illawarra Crescent North (limited stops)	361	9 October 2016	
889	Perth Busport	East Ballajura	Fitzgerald Street, Alexander Drive and Cassowary Drive (limited stops)	362	9 October 2016	
940	Esplanade Busport	Hamilton Hill	Booragoon Bus Station (limited stops)	115	9 October 2016	
349	Galleria bus station	Midland station	Benara Road and West Swan Road	Withdrawn, replaced by school special route 749	25 June 2017	
379	Mirrabooka bus station	Ballajura	Beach Road and Illawarra Crescent South	Withdrawn	28 January 2018	
170	Elizabeth Quay Bus station	Bull Creek Station	Victoria Park, Shelley, Rossmoyne	178	7 October 2018	
176	Elizabeth Quay Bus station	Wilson	Victoria Park	Withdrawn, merged into route 178 short trips	7 October 2018	
70	Elizabeth Quay Bus station	Curtin University	Kensington	Withdrawn, partly replaced by route 33	17 February 2019 (last service 15 February 2019)	
905	Perth Busport	Midland station	Replaces Midland line train services	901	16 June 2019	
308	Midland station	Swan District Hospital	Hamersley Street and Margaret Street	Withdrawn, partly replaced by route 310 short trips	21 July 2019	
956	Bassendean station	Banrock Drive Ellenbrook (Annie's Landing Estate)	Altone Road, Lord Street, Ellenbrook Transfer Station and The Broadway	Withdrawn, merged into route 955 short trips	21 July 2019	
16	Perth Busport	Dianella	William Street and Crawford Road	Withdrawn	25 August 2019 (last service 23 August 2019)	
352	Whitfords station	Landsdale	Kingsway	Withdrawn, partly replaced by routes 374 and 376	8 March 2020 (last service 5 March 2020)	
365	Mirrabooka bus station	Kingsway City	Walderton Avenue and Girrawheen Avenue	Withdrawn, partly replaced by routes 374, 375, 385, 386 and 448	8 March 2020	
372	Mirrabooka bus station	Darch	Finchley Cress and Highclere Boulevard	Withdrawn, partly replaced by route 374, 375, 385 and 386	8 March 2020	
469	Whitfords station	Wangara	Prindiville Drive	Withdrawn, merged into route 355	8 March 2020 (last service 6 March 2020)	
150	East Perth	Booragoon bus station	Elizabeth Quay, Kwinana Freeway and Reynolds Road	Withdrawn, merged into route 160 short trips	19 July 2020 (last service 17 July 2020)	
501	Bull Creek station	Fremantle station	Marmion Street	915	19 July 2020	
522	Cockburn Central station	Phoenix Park	Beeliar Drive, Cockburn Road and Spearwood Avenue	Withdrawn, replaced by school special route 770	19 July 2020	
249	Kelmscott Station	Armadale Station	Armadale Health Service	219	21 February 2021 (last service 19 February 2021)	
26	East Perth	Nedlands	Thomas Street and Monash Avenue	Withdrawn, partly replaced by the Purple CAT and routes 24 and 25	10 October 2022	
36	Elizabeth Quay	Midland station	Great Eastern Highway	Withdrawn, partly replaced by routes 290 and 940	10 October 2022	
40	Elizabeth Quay	Perth Airport, Terminals 3 and 4	Great Eastern Highway	Withdrawn, partly replaced by routes 292 and 940	10 October 2022	
286	Elizabeth Quay	Maida Vale	Great Eastern Highway, Belmont Forum Shopping Centre, Forrestfield Forum	Withdrawn, partly replaced by routes 270 and 271	10 October 2022 (last service 7 October 2022)	
287	Elizabeth Quay	Forrestfield	Great Eastern Highway, Belmont Forum Shopping Centre, Forrestfield Forum	Withdrawn, partly replaced by routes 270 and 271	10 October 2022 (last service 7 October 2022)	
288	Elizabeth Quay	Maida Vale	Shepperton Road, Belmont Forum Shopping Centre, Forrestfield Forum	Withdrawn, partly replaced by routes 270 and 271	10 October 2022	
291	Kalamunda bus station	Gooseberry Hill	Railway Road	274	10 October 2022 (last service 7 October 2022)	
294	Midland station	Westfield Carousel	High Wycombe and Forrestfield, Cannington station	Withdrawn, partly replaced by routes 277, 278 and 280	10 October 2022 (last service 8 October 2022)	
295	Elizabeth Quay	Walliston	Great Eastern Highway and Kalamunda bus station	Withdrawn, partly replaced by routes 275 and 940	10 October 2022 (last service 7 October 2022)	
296	Elizabeth Quay	Kalamunda bus station	Great Eastern Highway, Newburn Road, Gooseberry Hill Road	Withdrawn, partly replaced by routes 276 and 940	10 October 2022	
297	Midland station	Kalamunda bus station	Midland Road and Gooseberry Hill Road	Withdrawn, partly replaced by routes 276, 277 and 307	10 October 2022 (last service 7 October 2022)	
298	Elizabeth Quay	Maida Vale	Shepperton Road, Belmont Forum Shopping Centre, Abernethy Road	Withdrawn, partly replaced by routes 38, 270, 275, 276, 277, 278 and 293	10 October 2022 (last service 7 October 2022)	
299	Elizabeth Quay	Walliston	Great Eastern Highway and Kalamunda bus station	Withdrawn, partly replaced by routes 275 and 940	10 October 2022	
304	Midland station	South Guildford	Waterhall Road	Withdrawn, replaced by route 291	10 October 2022 (last service 8 October 2022)	
330	Mundaring	Sawyers Valley	Riley Road and Keane Street West	Withdrawn, replaced by route 331	10 October 2022 (last service 7 October 2022)	
340	Bassendean station	Caversham	Lord Street	Withdrawn, merged into route 353	10 October 2022 (last service 7 October 2022)	
380	Elizabeth Quay	Perth Airport, Terminals 1 and 2	Great Eastern Hwy and Belmont Forum Shopping Centre	Withdrawn, partly replaced by routes 37, 38, 39, 270, 293 and 935	10 October 2022	
60	Elizabeth Quay	Galleria bus station	William Street, North Street and Walter Road	980	13 November 2022	
559	Rockingham Station	Secret Harbour	Warnbro station and Warnbro Sound Avenue	Withdrawn, partly replaced by routes 558 and 574	12 June 2023 (last service 9 June 2023)	
562	Rockingham Station	Warnbro Station	Willmott Drive	559	12 June 2023	
587	Mandurah Station	Lakelands	Bortolo Drive	586	12 June 2023 (last service 9 June 2023)	
7: Blue CAT	Fremantle station	Douro Road	South Terrace and Marine Terrace	Withdrawn, partly replaced by route 532 short trips	1 October 2023	
48	Elizabeth Quay	Galleria bus station	Lord Street and Guildford Road	40	21 April 2024	
55	Elizabeth Quay	Bassendean	Lord Street and Guildford Road	Withdrawn, partly replaced by route 45	21 April 2024	
490	Butler Station	Two Rocks	Marmion Avenue and Two Rocks Road	Withdrawn, partly replaced by routes 486, 492, 495 and 498	15 July 2024	
491	Butler Station	Yanchep	Marmion Avenue and Brazier Road	Withdrawn, partly replaced by routes 486, 492, 494, 495 and 496	15 July 2024	
66	Elizabeth Quay	Galleria Bus Station	Beaufort Street	Withdrawn, replaced by route 950X	9 December 2024 (last service 6 December 2024)	
311	Midland Station	Bullsbrook	Great Northern Highway	Withdrawn, replaced by routes 345 and 745	9 December 2024	
334	Ellenbrook (Malvern Springs)	Ellenbrook Town Centre	Elmridge Parkway and Westgrove Drive	Withdrawn, replaced by route 342	9 December 2024 (last service 7 December 2024)	
335	Midland Station	Ellenbrook Town Centre	West Swan Road and Henley Brook Bus Station	Withdrawn, replaced by routes 349, 358 and 359	9 December 2024 (last service 6 December 2024)	
336	Henley Brook Bus Station	Ellenbrook (Malvern Springs)	Highpoint Boulevard and Brookmount Drive	Withdrawn, replaced by routes 341, 346 and 347	9 December 2024 (last service 7 December 2024)	
337	Henley Brook Bus Station	Ellenbrook Town Centre	Aveley	Withdrawn, replaced by routes 343, 346, 348 and 349	9 December 2024	
338	Henley Brook Bus Station	Ellenbrook Town Centre	Aveley	Withdrawn, replaced by routes 343, 346, 348 and 349	9 December 2024	
341	Galleria Bus Station	Beechboro	Bassendean Station and Sturtridge Road	Withdrawn, partly replaced by route 356	9 December 2024	
342	Galleria Bus Station	Beechboro	Bassendean Station and Titus Road	Withdrawn, partly replaced by route 356	9 December 2024	
343	Galleria Bus Station	Beechboro	Bottlebrush Drive	Withdrawn, partly replaced by routes 351 and 354	9 December 2024 (last service 7 December 2024)	
344	Galleria Bus Station	Warwick Station	Ballajura and Alexander Heights	Withdrawn, replaced by routes 350, 351, 361, 362, 363, and 451	9 December 2024	
345	Galleria Bus Station	Bennett Springs	Beechboro Road	Withdrawn, replaced by routes 353 and 356	9 December 2024	
346	Galleria Bus Station	Noranda	Emberson Road	Withdrawn, replaced by routes 350, 352, 950 and 950X	9 December 2024	
347	Galleria Bus Station	Noranda	Camboon Road	Withdrawn, replaced by routes 350, 352 and 361	9 December 2024	
353	Bassendean Station	Henley Brook Bus Station	Lord Street, Dayton and Brabham	Withdrawn, replaced by routes 347, 350 and 357	9 December 2024	
354	Mirrabooka Bus Station	Dog Swamp, Yokine	Nollamara Shopping Centre and Flinders Street	371	9 December 2024 (last service 6 December 2024)	
355	Whitfords Station	Ellenbrook Town Centre	Wangara Industrial and Gnangara Road, Henley Brook Bus Station	455	9 December 2024 (last service 6 December 2024)	
360	Perth Busport	Alexander Heights	Alexander Drive and Illawarra Crescent South	Withdrawn, replaced by routes 360 and 452	9 December 2024 (last service 6 December 2024)	
361	Perth Busport	Alexander Heights	Alexander Drive and Illawarra Crescent North	Withdrawn, replaced by route 360	9 December 2024	
362	Perth Busport	East Ballajura	Alexander Drive and Cassowary Drive	Withdrawn, replaced by route 360	9 December 2024	
370	Perth Busport	Mirrabooka Bus Station	Flinders Street and Nollamara Avenue	Withdrawn, replaced by route 970X	9 December 2024 (last service 6 December 2024)	
371	Galleria Bus Station	Warwick Station	Mirrabooka Bus Station and Balga Plaza	Withdrawn, replaced by route 975	9 December 2024	
376	Mirrabooka Bus Station	Whitfords Station	Mirrabooka Avenue and Gnangara Road	Withdrawn, replaced by routes 452, 970 and 970X	9 December 2024	
378	Mirrabooka Bus Station	Alexander Heights	Ballajura	Withdrawn, replaced by routes 362, 451 and 452	9 December 2024 (last service 7 December 2024)	
385	Perth Busport	Kingsway City Shopping Centre	Wanneroo Road and Balga Plaza	386X	9 December 2024 (last service 6 December 2024)	
387	Perth Busport	Warwick Station	Wanneroo Road and Balcatta Road	Withdrawn, replaced by route 416	9 December 2024	
955	Galleria Bus Station	Ellenbrook (Annie's Landing)	Collier Road, Bassendean Station Altone Road, Lord Street, Henley Brook Bus Station and The Broadway	Withdrawn, replaced by Ellenbrook Line and routes 47, 340, 347 and 355	9 December 2024	
75	Elizabeth Quay	Canning Vale	Berwick Street, Etwell Street, Curtin University Bus Station and Riverton Forum Shopping Centre	Withdrawn, replaced by route 73	9 June 2025	
201	Cannington Bus Station	Curtin University Bus Station	Bentley Health Service and Bentley Plaza	222	9 June 2025 (last service 6 June 2025)	
202	Westfield Carousel	Queens Park	Cannington Station, Wharf Street and William Street (Clockwise circular service)	224	9 June 2025 (last service 7 June 2025)	
203	Westfield Carousel	Queens Park	Cannington Station, William Street and Wharf Street (Anticlockwise circular service)	225	9 June 2025	
204	Murdoch University	Maddington Station	Murdoch Station, Amherst Road and Warton Road	Withdrawn, replaced by route 209	9 June 2025 (last service 6 June 2025)	
205	Murdoch University	Maddington Station	Murdoch Station, Bridge Road and Warton Road	Withdrawn, replaced by routes 208, 209 and 210	9 June 2025	
206	Murdoch University	Cannington Bus Station	Murdoch Station, Boardman Road and Thornlie station	Withdrawn, replaced by routes 207 and 208	9 June 2025	
207	Murdoch University	Thornlie Station	Murdoch Station and Nicholson Road	Withdrawn, replaced by routes 206 and 213	9 June 2025 (last service 7 June 2025)	
208	Murdoch Station	Cannington Bus Station	Bannister Road	Withdrawn, replaced by routes 204, 205 and 207	9 June 2025 (last service 6 June 2025)	
210	Thornlie Station	Gosnells Station	Spencer Road and Fremantle Road	216	9 June 2025 (last service 7 June 2025)	
211	Thornlie Station	Gosnells Station	Spencer Road and Dorothy Street	215	9 June 2025 (last service 6 June 2025)	
212	Thornlie Station	Southern River (Vale Shopping Centre)	Forest Lakes Drive	214	9 June 2025	
223	Thornlie Station	Thornlie	Berehaven Avenue	Withdrawn, replaced by route 208	9 June 2025 (last service 6 June 2025)	
230	Perth Busport	Thornlie Station	Shepperton Road, Albany Highway and Spencer Road	Withdrawn, replaced by Thornlie Cockburn Line	9 June 2025 (last service 6 June 2025)	
506	Bull Creek Station	Parkwood	Southlands Shopping Centre and Vellgrove Avenue	Withdrawn, replaced by routes 203 and 925	9 June 2025 (last service 6 June 2025)	
507	Bull Creek Station	Cannington Bus Station	Southlands Shopping Centre, Hossack Avenue and Lynwood	Withdrawn, replaced by routes 203 and 925	9 June 2025	
508	Bull Creek Station	Cannington Bus Station	Apsley Road and Ferndale Crescent	Withdrawn, replaced by route 202	9 June 2025	
509	Bull Creek Station	Cannington Bus Station	High Road and Fern Road	Withdrawn, replaced by route 200	9 June 2025 (last service 7 June 2025)	
905	Perth Busport	Victoria Park Station	Claisebrook Station and Burswood Station	Withdrawn, replaced by Thornlie Cockburn Line	9 June 2025 (last service 2 June 2025)	
908	Victoria Park Station	Cannington Bus Station	Shepperton Road and Sevenoaks Street	Withdrawn, replaced by Thornlie Cockburn Line	9 June 2025	
221	Cannington Station	Armadale Station	Albany Highway	Withdrawn, replaced by Armadale Line	13 October 2025	
252	Armadale Station	Mundijong	Soldiers Road and Patterson Road	Withdrawn, replaced by route 259	13 October 2025 (last service 11 October 2025)	
253	Armadale Station	Jarrahdale	Watkins Road and Jarrahdale Road	Withdrawn, replaced by route 262	13 October 2025 (last service 11 October 2025)	
907	Cannington Station	Armadale Station	Albany Highway	Withdrawn, replaced by Armadale Line	13 October 2025	
272	Kalamunda Bus Station	Kalamnuda Community Centre	Mead Street	Withdrawn	9 November 2025 (last service 7 November 2025)	
534	Aubin Grove Station	Wattleup	Russell Road	Withdrawn	1 February 2026 (last service 18 December 2025)	
100	Canning Bridge Station	Cannington Station	Curtin University Bus Station, Kent Street and Manning Road	Withdrawn, replaced by route 920	5 July 2026	
36	Cannington Station	Airport Central	Wharf St and Kewdale Rd	Withdrawn, replaced by route 224	6 September 2026	
179	Elizabeth Quay	Bull Creek Station	Albany Highway and Riverton Forum Shopping Centre	Withdrawn, replaced by routes 178 and 200	6 September 2026	
224	Westfield Carousel	Westfield Carousel	Wharf Street and William Street (Clockwise circular service)	Withdrawn, replaced by routes 224, 226 and 227	6 September 2026	
225	Westfield Carousel	Westfield Carousel	William Street and Wharf Street (Anticlockwise circular service)	Withdrawn, replaced by routes 224, 226 and 227	6 September 2026	
229	Westfield Carousel	Maddington Central	Cannington Station, Kenwick Road, Maddington Station	Withdrawn, replaced by routes 226 and 227	6 September 2026	
998	Fremantle Station	Fremantle Station	University of Western Australia and Shenton Park, Stirling, Morley, Bayswater, Oats Street, Curtin University, Murdoch Stations	Withdrawn, replaced by routes 996, 997, 998 and 999	1 November 2026	
999	Fremantle Station	Fremantle Station	Murdoch, Curtin University, Oats Street, Bayswater, Galleria, Stirling, Shenton Park Stations and University of Western Australia	Withdrawn, replaced by routes 996, 997, 998 and 999	1 November 2026	

== See also ==
- List of Transperth bus stations
- Transportation in Australia
