= West End Girls (disambiguation) =

"West End Girls" is the name of a popular song by the Pet Shop Boys.

West End Girls may also refer to:

- West End Girls, a book by Barbara Tate
- West End Girls (Canadian band), a 1990s girl group, and their self-titled album
- West End Girls (Swedish band), a Pet Shop Boys cover band
- "West End Girls", a season four episode of Degrassi: The Next Generation

== See also ==
- West End Girl
- West End (disambiguation)
- Western Girls (disambiguation)
