= Westend =

Westend may refer to:

- Westend (Trevilians, Virginia), an historic house in Virginia listed on the NRHP
- Westend (Berlin), a locality of Berlin in Germany
- Westend, Copenhagen, a street in Copenhagen
- Westend (Frankfurt am Main), a borough of Frankfurt am Main in Germany
- Westend, Espoo, a borough of Espoo in Finland
- Wiesbaden-Westend, a borough of Wiesbaden in Germany
- Westend, a former name of Łękno, a neighbourhood in Szczecin, Poland
- Westend (band), an Austrian group that performed in the Eurovision Song Contest 1983
- Westende Hamborn
- Neu-Westend, a neighbourhood in Berlin, Germany
- Neu-Westend, a former name of Pogodno, a neighbourhood in Szczecin, now corresponding to Pogodno
- Westend Lake (Westendsee), a former name of Rusałka, a lake in Szczecin, Poland

== See also ==
- West End (disambiguation)
- Westende, a town in Belgium
