= Western Girls =

Western Girls may refer to:

- "Western Girls" (Marty Stuart song), 1990
- "Western Girls" (Dragon song), 1986

== See also ==
- West End Girls (disambiguation)
