= Montefiore New Rochelle Hospital =

- Montefiore Medical Center

Geography
- Location: New Rochelle, Westchester County, New York, United States
- Coordinates: 40.912993°N 73.7874939°W

Organization
- Type: Teaching
- Affiliated university: Albert Einstein College of Medicine
- Network: Montefiore Health System

Services
- Emergency department: Yes
- Beds: 242
- Speciality: primary, acute, emergency, long-term

History
- Founded: 1892

Links
- Website: www.montefiorehealthsystem.org/newrochelle
- Lists: Hospitals in New York State

Montefiore New Rochelle Hospital (formerly New Rochelle Hospital and Sound Shore Medical Center) is a community-based, teaching hospital located at 16 Guion Place in the West End of the city of New Rochelle, in Westchester County, New York, and affiliated with the Albert Einstein College of Medicine. The hospital opened on Huguenot Street in 1892 as New Rochelle Hospital. On November 6, 2013, after it filed for bankruptcy, Sound Shore was acquired by the Bronx-based Montefiore Medical Center, the University Hospital for the Albert Einstein College of Medicine, was renamed Montefiore New Rochelle Hospital, and became part of the Montefiore Health System.

== Accreditation ==
Montefiore New Rochelle Hospital is accredited by The Joint Commission, the nation's oldest and largest hospital accreditation agency.

== Available programs and specialty services ==
The hospital has been identified as a national Solucient 100 Performance Improvement Leader, a center of excellence for bariatric surgery and first trimester antepartum screening, and awarded approval with commendation by The Commission on Cancer of the American College of Surgeons.

Montefiore New Rochelle Hospital has also been designated a Sinus Center of Excellence in the treatment of chronic sinusitis. Montefiore New Rochelle Hospital officials said it is one of only two hospitals in Westchester and only the fourth in New York to receive the distinction. Patients with chronic sinusitis are treated with balloon sinuplasty, a minimally invasive and innovative system, by physicians in the Division of Otolaryngology. The technique, which uses a balloon to spread and open the sinuses, can replace conventional sinus surgery that requires removal of bone and tissue to open passageways. Dr. Matthew J. Kates, chief of head and neck surgery in the Division of Otolaryngology, called it the first innovation in sinus surgery in nearly 20 years. Hudson Valley Hospital Center in Cortlandt Manor is the other sinus center in Westchester county.

Montefiore New Rochelle Hospital serves both the local community, the greater Southern Westchester region, northern New York City, and western Connecticut. It is the largest private teaching hospital in Westchester County, with residencies in Internal Medicine, General Surgery, Anesthesiology, and Pediatrics, and fellowship programs in Laparoscopic Surgery, Endocrinology, and Gastroenterology. Montefiore New Rochelle Hospital is a designated Perinatal Hospital and Stroke Center, and is the only designated New York State Area Trauma Center in Southern Westchester County.

Specialty facilities include a New York State Department of Health designated level 3 neonatal intensive care unit and the Harriet and Bernard Miller Adult Cardiac Catheterization Laboratory. There are programs in cancer care, bariatric weight loss, renal dialysis, laparoscopic surgery, orthopaedics, gerontology, and sleep medicine. The facility offers primary, acute, emergency and long-term health care. In addition to its 242 inpatient beds, the hospital campus also houses the 150-bed Schaffer Extended Care Center for senior citizens, which provides 50 beds for short-term rehabilitation patients and 100 for long-term residents.

== Recognition ==
- Center of Excellence for Bariatric Surgery and 1st Trimester Antepartum Screening

== Notable deaths ==
- John McGraw, baseball player and manager of the New York Giants
