= West End =

West End most commonly refers to:

- West End of London, an area of central London, England
- West End theatre, a popular term for mainstream professional theatre staged in the large theatres of London, England

West End may also refer to:

== Places ==
=== Anguilla ===
- West End, Anguilla
  - West End Pond
  - West End (Anguilla House of Assembly Constituency)

=== Australia ===
- Fremantle West End Heritage area, a designated heritage precinct in Fremantle, Western Australia
- West End, Queensland, an inner-city suburb of southern Brisbane
- West End, Queensland (Townsville), an old suburb of Townsville
- West End, Adelaide, a precinct between the western ends of North Terrace and Hindley Streets in Adelaide city centre, South Australia
- West End, Western Australia, a western suburb of Geraldton

=== Bahamas ===
- West End, Grand Bahama

=== Canada ===
- West End, Saskatchewan, a resort village
- West End, Kamloops, British Columbia
- West End, Vancouver, British Columbia
- West End, Winnipeg, Manitoba
- West End, Halifax, Nova Scotia
- The West End, New Westminster, British Columbia

=== Finland ===
- Westend, Espoo, a district near the seashore and the eastern border to Helsinki

=== Germany ===
- Westend, Berlin, a borough of Charlottenburg in Berlin
- Westend, Frankfurt am Main, a district of Frankfurt am Main, Hesse

=== New Zealand ===
- West End, a suburb of Palmerston North
- West End, a suburb of Timaru

=== Norway ===
- East End and West End of Oslo

=== Spain ===
- West End, San Antonio, Ibiza

=== United Kingdom ===
==== England ====
- West End, Bedfordshire, a hamlet
- West End, Warfield, an area of Bracknell, Berkshire
- West End, Hampshire, a village and parish near Southampton
- West End, a small village near Hatfield, Hertfordshire
- West End, a suburb of Morecambe, Lancashire
- West End, a suburb of Oswaldtwistle, Lancashire
- West End, Lincoln, an area of Lincoln
- West End, North Somerset, North Somerset
- West End, Sheffield, an area of Sheffield, South Yorkshire
- West End, a small village near Hatfield, South Yorkshire
- West End, Surrey, a village and parish
- West End, Esher, Surrey, a suburb
- West End, West Riding of Yorkshire village flooded for a reservoir
- West End, Bremhill, Wiltshire, a hamlet
- West End, Donhead St Andrew, Wiltshire, a hamlet
- West End, Ebbesbourne Wake, Wiltshire, a hamlet
- West End of Derby
- West End of Leicester
- West End of London
  - West End (Westminster ward), a ward in the City of Westminster
- West End, the former name of West Hampstead, London
  - West End Lane, a street in Hampstead, London

==== Scotland ====
- West End, Aberdeen, an area of Aberdeen
- West End, Dundee, an area of the city of Dundee
- West End, Edinburgh, of Edinburgh, forms a large part of the city centre
- West End, Glasgow
- West End, Paisley

==== Wales ====
- West End (Caldicot ward), an electoral ward of Caldicot, Monmouthshire

=== United States ===
Listed by state then city:

- West End, Mobile, Alabama, the westernmost section of the midtown neighborhood in Mobile
- West End-Cobb Town, Alabama, a census-designated place in Calhoun County
- West End, Alameda, California, neighborhood of Alameda, California
- West End, district in Downtown Santa Ana, California
- West End, Hartford, Connecticut
- West End (Florida)
- West End (Atlanta), Georgia, neighborhood, in Atlanta, Georgia
  - West End (MARTA station), Atlanta, Georgia, a passenger rail station in the West End neighborhood of Atlanta, Georgia
- West End, Davenport, Iowa
- West End, Lexington, Kentucky, an urban neighborhood
- West End, New Orleans, Louisiana park, entertainment, residential, marina district on Lake Pontchartrain, New Orleans, Louisiana
- West End, Boston, a district of Boston, Massachusetts
- West End (Portland, Maine), an urban neighborhood in Portland, Maine
- West End Street, a main road in the industrial neighborhood of Delray, Detroit, Michigan
- West End, Jersey City
- West End, Monmouth County, New Jersey, neighborhood in Long Branch
- West End, Trenton, New Jersey, neighborhood
- In New York City:
  - BMT West End Line of the New York City Subway, connecting to Coney Island
  - West End Avenue, a major north-south road on the west side of Manhattan
  - West End Bar, a bar serving Columbia University on Broadway in Morningside Heights, Manhattan, New York City
- West End (New Rochelle), a neighborhood of New Rochelle, Westchester County, New York
- West End Beach, a section of Jones Beach State Park, Long Island, New York
- West End, New York
- West End, North Carolina
- West End, High Point, North Carolina
- West End, Cincinnati, a neighborhood in Cincinnati, Ohio
- West End (Pittsburgh), a neighborhood that was known as Temperanceville before being annexed by Pittsburgh, Pennsylvania
- West End, Providence, Rhode Island, a neighborhood in the southwestern part of Providence, Rhode Island
- West End, Nashville, Tennessee, an urban neighborhood where Vanderbilt University is located
- West End (Houston), a neighborhood in Houston, Texas
- West End Historic District, Dallas, Texas, an area of downtown Dallas
- West End, Alexandria, Virginia, an area annexed by Alexandria, Virginia
- West End (Richmond, Virginia), a suburban region of Richmond, Virginia
- West End, Roanoke, Virginia, an area in central Roanoke, Virginia
- West End, Washington, D.C., an area in Northwest Washington
- West End, West Virginia

== Stations ==
- West End station (DART), a DART train station in Dallas, Texas
- West End station (MARTA), a MARTA train station in Atlanta, Georgia
- Science Park station (MBTA), signed as Science Park/West End, an MBTA train station in Boston, Massachusetts

== Music ==
=== Songs ===
- "West End Girls", a song by Pet Shop Boys from their 1985 album Please
- "West End Riot", a 1999 song by The Living End from their debut self-titled album

=== Other uses in music ===
- Eddie Gordon (born 1959), English music producer known professionally as "West End"
- West End Records, a disco record label from New York, US
- West End (album), 2019, by the 69 Eyes

== Beer ==
- West End Brewery (Hindley Street) (1859–1980), an Adelaide brewer in the colony of South Australia
  - Its premises in Hindley Street, Adelaide, after the takeover by the South Australian Brewing Company
  - Different premises in Thebarton, after the sale of the Hindley Street building in 1980, rebadged by the Lion company as West End
- West End Draught, a beer brewed in South Australia

== Other ==
- West End (club), a nightclub in Chicago, US
- West End Games, a publisher of wargames and role-playing games, including Paranoia and Star Wars
- WestEnd City Center, a shopping centre in Budapest, Hungary
- West End Rowing Club, a rowing club based in Auckland, New Zealand

== See also ==
- City West (disambiguation)
- Westend (disambiguation)
- West Side (disambiguation)
