= West End, New Rochelle, New York =

Neighborhood of New Rochelle, New York

Coordinates: 40.910°N 73.772°W

The West End is a working-class neighborhood of New Rochelle, New York.

The West End's borders include Metro North's New Haven Rail Line in the south, the border with Pelham, New York on the west, Sickles Avenue on the north and Memorial Highway on the east.

Most of the West End is included in New Rochelle's Council District 1. It is home to a predominantly Hispanic population. It is home to Montefiore New Rochelle Hospital. The ZIP code is 10801.
