= City West Housing =

Nonprofit housing company in NSW, Australia

City West Housing Pty Ltd (CWH) is a nonprofit affordable rental housing company.

It was established in 1994 by the New South Wales State Government. City West Housing Pty Ltd was set up to provide low-cost accommodation to people with very low to moderate incomes, including essential workers who would not otherwise be able to afford to rent in this inner Sydney area. Tenants pay rent based on their gross household income. Rent is calculated on a sliding scale from 25% to 30% of income.

Its charter was to provide up to 600 residential units in the Ultimo and Pyrmont areas of Sydney Australia over a 30-year period and be financially self-sufficient, which it achieved. In its first 15 years of operation it produced 550 units. As of 2016, the company has over 731 properties in its portfolio and provides housing for over 1,400 people.

The company expanded to include provision of housing in the Green Square area of Sydney and has produced quality housing. Its current CEO is Leonie King, who joined the organisation in 2017. It is a registered Community Housing Provider under the National Regulatory Scheme for Community Housing (NRSCH).
