= Perth Busport =

Underground central bus station in Perth, Western Australia

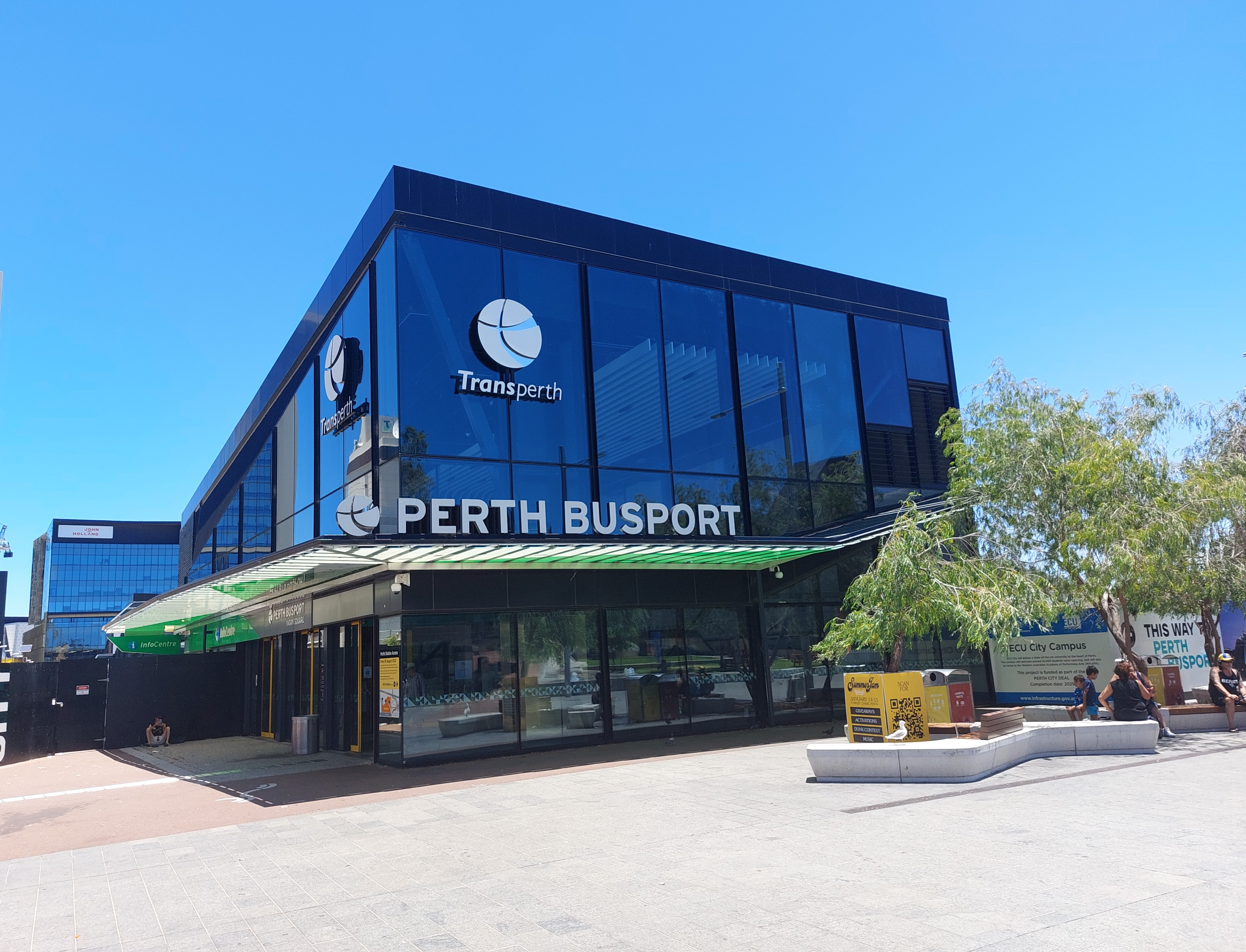
- Yagan Square entrance in 2023

General information
- Location: Wellington Street; Perth, Western Australia; Australia
- Coordinates: 31.9505°S 115.8577°E
- Owner: Public Transport Authority
- Operator: Transperth
- Bus routes: 36
- Bus stands: 16
- Connections: Train transfer at Perth station

Other information
- Fare zone: 1 /

History
- Opened: 13 July 2016 (official); 17 July 2016 (operational)
Location

Perth Busport is an underground central bus station in Perth, Western Australia, located underneath Wellington Street. It was officially opened by Premier of Western Australia Colin Barnett and Minister for Transport Dean Nalder on 13 July 2016.

== Description ==
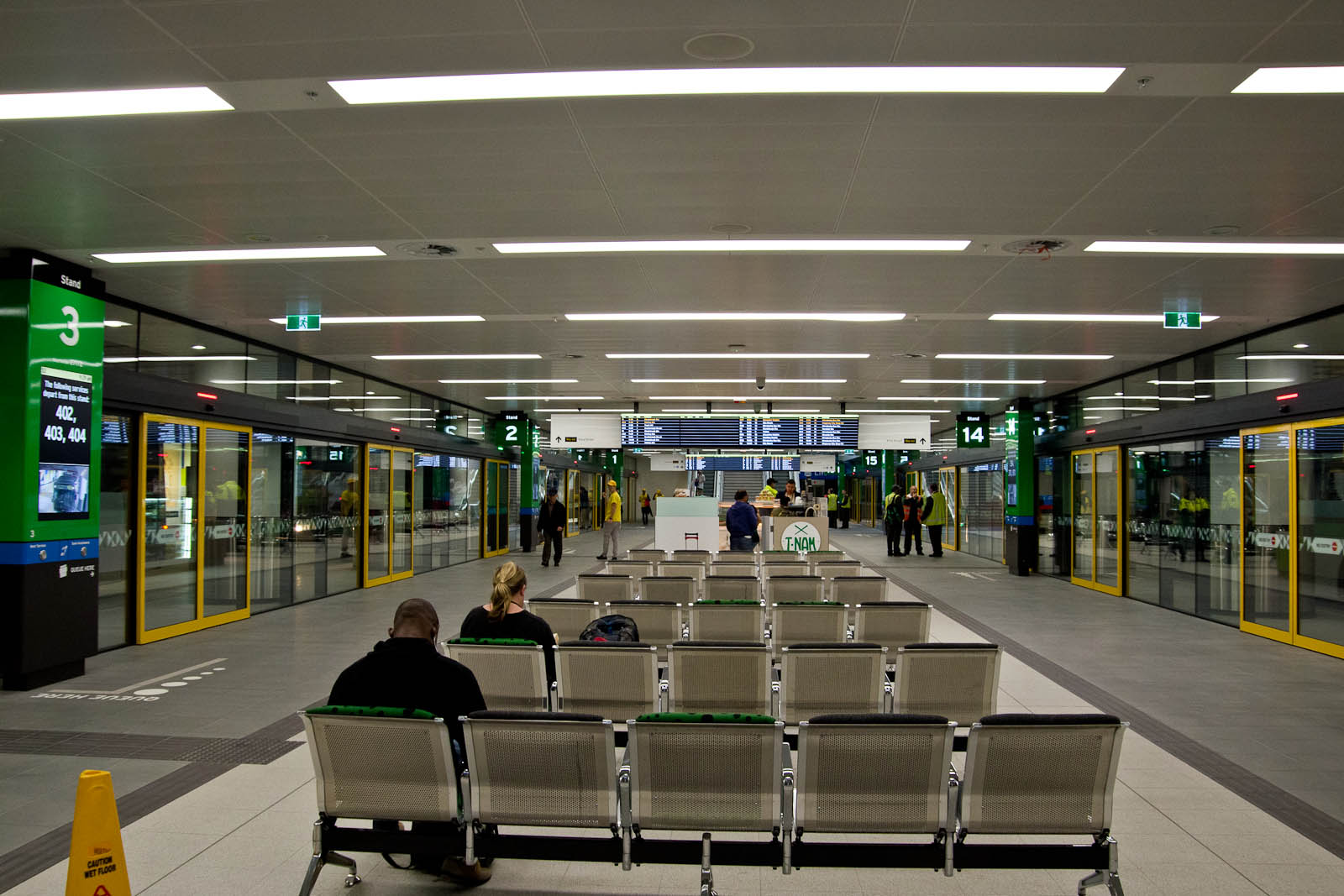
The underground waiting area at the busport

Perth Busport is located underground, west of Perth railway station, between Wellington, Roe Street and Milligan streets. There are two bus access points, from Wellington Street and Milligan Street, and three passenger entrances, at Yagan Square, Queen Street, and King Street. Edith Cowan University's multi-storey inner city campus, ECU City, is located directly above the Yagan Square passenger entrance.

The underground lounge is air-conditioned, contains 160 seats, two kiosks, and digital screens displaying updated departure information. Buses loop around the lounge, which is surrounded by double-glazed glass, and has sixteen stands grouped into four areas, each with four stands.

== History ==
Perth Busport commenced operations on 17 July 2016, served by 25 Transperth routes operated by Path Transit, Swan Transit and Transdev WA. The temporary Roe Street bus station closed on the same day as the new busport opened. Perth Busport occupies the site of the former Wellington Street bus station.

== Bus routes ==
34 regular Transperth bus services start and terminate at Perth Busport. The busport uses a dynamic stand allocation system, meaning that services are only allocated a specific stand as they approach the busport. Rail replacement bus services for the Yanchep, Mandurah, Fremantle, Midland and Armadale railway lines also start and terminate at Perth Busport when the lines cannot operate from Perth Station, departing from stands 5–8.

Stop	Route	Destination / description	Notes	
Stands 1–4 (section B)	990	to Scarborough Beach Bus Station via Charles Street, Scarborough Beach Road & Glendalough station	High frequency	
Stands 1–4 (section B)	910	to Fremantle station via The Causeway, Canning Highway, Canning Bridge station & East Fremantle	High frequency	
Stands 1–4 (section B)	15	to Glendalough Station via Newcastle Street, Oxford Street, Scarborough Beach Road, Anzac Road & Powis Street		
Stands 1–4 (section B)	402	to Stirling station via Loftus Street, Scarborough Beach Road, Main Street & Tuart Hill		
Stands 1–4 (section B)	403	to Stirling station via Loftus Street, London Street, Ediboro Street, Royal Street, Hamilton Street, Messina Avenue & Telford Crescent		
Stands 1–4 (section B)	404	to Tuart Hill via Loftus Street, London Street, McDonald Street, York Street & Swan Street		
Stands 1–4 (section B)	789	to Mercedes College	School Specials	
Stands 5–8 (section A)	38	to Cloverdale via Wellington Street, Archer Street, Wright Street, Belmont Forum & Belgravia Street		
Stands 5–8 (section A)	960	to Curtin University bus station via Wellington Street, Albany Highway & Kent Street	High frequency	
Stands 5–8 (section A)	220	to Armadale Station via Albany Highway		
Stands 5–8 (section A)	34	to Cannington station via Elizabeth Quay Bus Station, Angelo Street, Murray Street, Gillon Street, Curtin University bus station, Ashburton Street & Bentley Plaza		
Stands 5–8 (section A)	30	to Curtin University bus station via Elizabeth Quay Bus Station, Labouchere Road, Robert Street, Salter Point, Hope Avenue & Manning Road		
Stands 5–8 (section A)	31	to Salter Point via Elizabeth Quay Bus Station, Labouchere Road, Talbot Avenue, Canavan Crescent & Marsh Avenue		
Stands 5–8 (section A)	901	to Midland Station, replacing Midland line train services	Rail replacement services	
Stands 5–8 (section A)	902	to High Wycombe Station, replacing Airport line train services	Rail replacement services	
Stands 5–8 (section A)	903	to Ellenbrook Station, replacing Ellenbrook line train services	Rail replacement services	
Stands 5–8 (section A)	904	to Yanchep Station, replacing Yanchep line train services	Rail replacement services	
Stands 5–8 (section A)	906	to Fremantle Station, replacing Fremantle line train services	Rail replacement services	
Stands 5–8 (section A)	907	to Armadale Station, replacing Armadale line train services		
Stands 5–8 (section A)	909	to Mandurah Station, replacing Mandurah line train services		
Stands 9–12 (Section A)	19	to Dog Swamp Shopping Centre via Fitzgerald Street, Alexander Drive & Yokine		
Stands 9–12 (Section A)	722	to Goodwill Industries, Malaga via Alexander Drive	School Specials	
Stands 9–12 (Section A)	360	to Alexander Heights Shopping Centre via Fitzgerald Street, Alexander Drive, Illawarra Court South & Marangaroo Drive	Limited stops	
Stands 9–12 (Section A)	960	to Mirrabooka bus station via Fitzgerald Street, Alexander Drive & Yirrigan Drive	High frequency	
Stands 9–12 (Section A)	67	to Mirrabooka Bus Station via Beaufort Street & Grand Promenade	selected trips diverting via April Road	
Stands 9–12 (Section A)	68	to Mirrabooka Bus Station via Beaufort Street & The Strand	selected trips diverting via Dianella Plaza	
Stands 9–12 (Section A)	81	to City Beach via Wellington Street, City West station, Cambridge Street, Floreat Forum & Oceanic Drive		
Stands 9–12 (Section A)	82	to City Beach via Wellington Street, City West station, Cambridge Street, The Boulevard, Floreat Forum & Templetonia Crescent (selected trips extend to Launceston Avenue via Branksome Gardens)		
Stands 9–12 (Section A)	83	to Wembley Downs via Wellington Street, City West station, Cambridge Street, Harborne Street, Grantham Street & Empire Avenue		
Stands 9–12 (Section A)	84	to Wembley Downs via Wellington Street, City West station, Cambridge Street, Harborne Street, Grantham Street & Hale Road		
Stands 9–12 (Section A)	85	to Glendalough Station via Wellington Street, City West station, Cambridge Street, Herdsman Parade & Harborne Street		
Stands 9–12 (Section A)	Stands 13–16 (Section B)	28	to Claremont Station via HBF Stadium	
Stands 9–12 (Section A)	Stands 13–16 (Section B)	790	to Trinity College	School Specials
791	Stands 13–16 (Section B)	to Trinity College	School Specials	
970	Stands 13–16 (Section B)	to Landsdale via Charles Street, Flinders Street & Nollamara Avenue, Mirrabooka bus station & Mirrabooka Avenue	High frequency Selected trips terminating Mirrabooka Bus Station	
970X	Stands 13–16 (Section B)	to Landsdale via Charles Street, Flinders Street & Nollamara Avenue, Mirrabooka bus station & Mirrabooka Avenue	Limited stops	
384	Stands 13–16 (Section B)	to Mirrabooka bus station via Charles Street, Wanneroo Road, Nollamara Shopping Centre & Ravenswood Drive		
386	Stands 13–16 (Section B)	to Kingsway City Shopping Centre via Charles Street, Wanneroo Road, Princess Road, Girrawheen Avenue and Highclere Boulevard		
386X	Stands 13–16 (Section B)	to Kingsway City Shopping Centre via Charles Street, Wanneroo Road, Princess Road, Girrawheen Avenue and Highclere Boulevard	Limited Stops	
388	Stands 13–16 (Section B)	to Warwick station via Charles Street, Wanneroo Road & Beach Road		
389	Stands 13–16 (Section B)	to Wanneroo via Charles Street & Wanneroo Road		
