= ForHousing =

Housing association in England

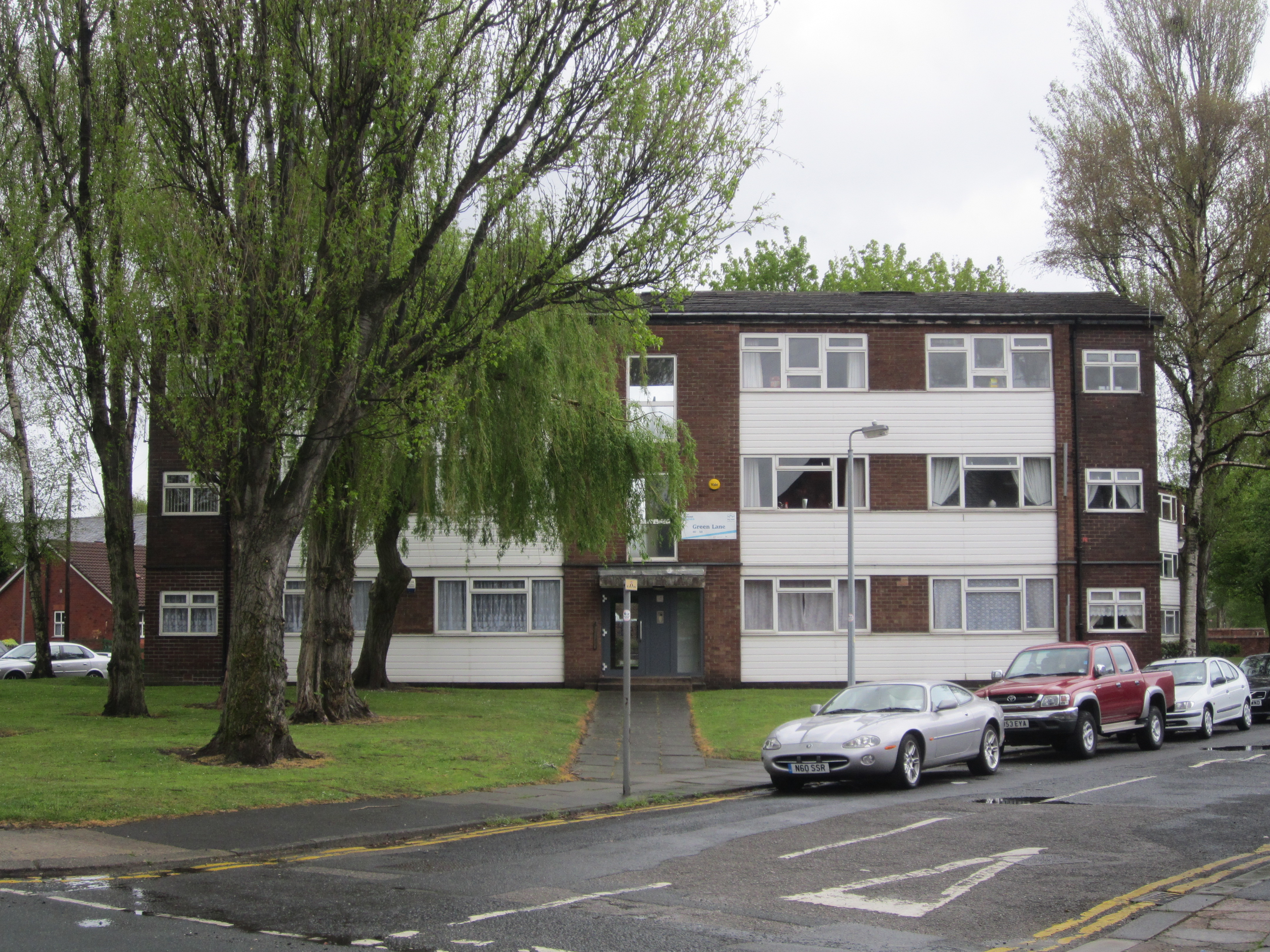
- ForHousing flats in Eccles
- Formerly: City West Housing Trust (2008–2019)
- Type: Charitable incorporated organisation
- Industry: Council housing; Homelessness
- Founded: 2008; 18 years ago in Salford, Greater Manchester
- Headquarters: 52 Regent Street, Eccles, Eccles, Greater Manchester, United Kingdom
- Area served: Salford; Liverpool; Oldham; Chester
- Products: Affordable housing
- Revenue: £138 million (2023/24)
- Number of employees: 624 (2024)
- Parent: None (formerly part of ForViva Group)
- Subsidiaries: ForCapital Ltd; ForHousing DevCo Ltd; ForLiving Ltd; Stockbridge Village Trust Ltd (dormant)
- Website: www.forhousing.co.uk

ForHousing is a housing association based in Eccles, Greater Manchester, United Kingdom. Established in 2008 as City West Housing Trust following a stock transfer from Salford City Council, the organisation rebranded to ForHousing in 2019. ForHousing manages affordable housing primarily across Salford, Liverpool, Oldham, and Chester.

In 2021, ForViva Group Limited, the former parent company of ForHousing, was deregistered as a registered provider of social housing and reconstituted as a Community Benefit Society. As of 2025, ForHousing Limited operates independently and is the principal registered entity, though the ForViva brand is still used in some contexts.

== History ==
ForHousing was originally formed as City West Housing Trust in 2008, following the transfer of housing stock from Salford City Council. In 2015, it became part of the newly established ForViva Group, alongside other housing associations and a construction arm. In 2019, the organisation rebranded to ForHousing. ForViva Group Limited was later deregistered, and ForHousing continues to operate as the main active entity.

== Scale and Operations ==
ForHousing owns and manages over 14,600 homes, predominantly in Salford, but also across Liverpool, Oldham, and Chester. The organisation plays a significant role in providing affordable housing solutions, with a reported turnover of £138 million for the 2023/24 financial year. ForHousing employs a substantial workforce, contributing to the wider housing sector employment across the region.

== Subsidiaries and Structure ==
ForHousing operates a number of subsidiaries to deliver its services and projects:

- ForCapital Ltd – Manages the group's loan facilities.
- ForHousing DevCo Ltd – Provides design and build services for new housing developments.
- ForLiving Ltd – Manages properties intended for market rent.
- Stockbridge Village Trust Ltd – Currently dormant.

== Governance and Regulation ==
In February 2025, the Regulator of Social Housing assessed ForHousing's governance and viability. The organisation holds a G2 rating for governance, indicating it meets governance requirements but has areas requiring improvement. Its financial viability is rated V2, showing it remains financially viable but needs to manage material risks to maintain compliance.

== Community Impact and Initiatives ==
ForHousing invests significantly in community development projects and initiatives to enhance the wellbeing of its tenants. It has been recognised for its award-winning approaches to tackling anti-social behaviour, including proactive engagement and swift intervention. The organisation collaborates closely with local authorities and community partners to create safer, more cohesive neighbourhoods.

== Area Served ==
ForHousing operates across multiple local authorities in North West England, with a significant presence in Salford. The organisation also has housing stock in Liverpool, Oldham, and Chester. Notable developments include:

- Salford: Projects such as a 39-home affordable housing development on a former industrial site, and a 48-home net-zero carbon development at the former Salford City Roosters rugby site.
- Liverpool: Completion of seven affordable bungalows in Stockbridge Village, Knowsley, as part of a £1 million project.
- Chester: Development of 16 new affordable homes in Ellesmere Port.

ForHousing maintains local housing offices in Eccles, Swinton, Irlam, and Little Hulton. These offices provide a range of services including rent payment assistance, housing support, tenancy advice, and community engagement activities.

== Incidents ==
- In November 2010, a gas explosion occurred on Merlin Road in Irlam, Salford, injuring 15 people and destroying four houses. At the time, the properties were undergoing renovation by City West Housing Trust (now ForHousing).
- In June 2016, a resident from Amblecote Gardens in Salford was hospitalized after falling from the second-floor balcony of a sheltered housing accommodation managed by ForHousing.
