= City West railway station =

Railway station in West Perth, Western Australia

City West
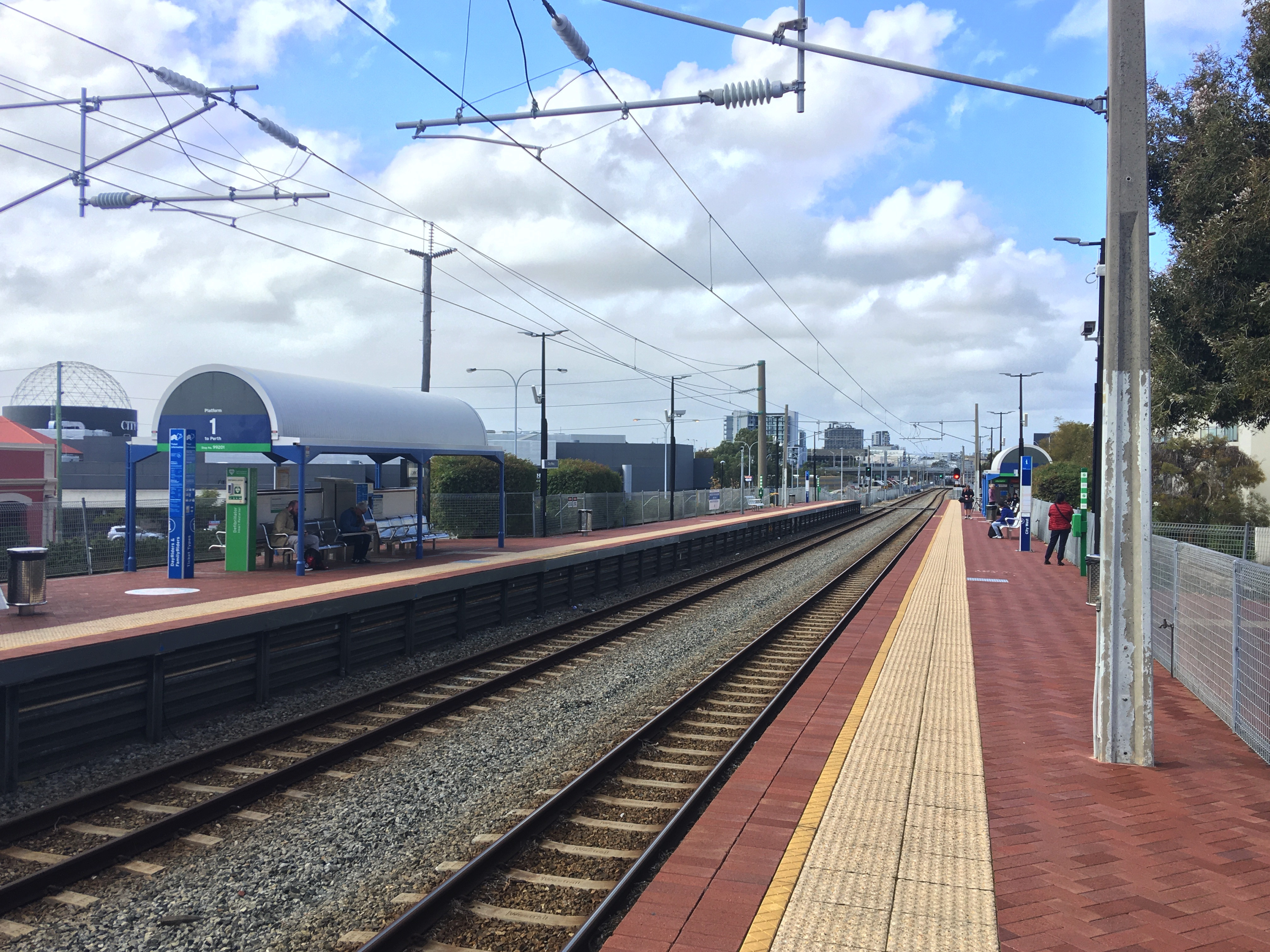
- Eastbound view from Platform 2, August 2021

General information
- Location: Railway Street, West Perth, Western Australia; Australia
- Coordinates: 31°56′41″S 115°50′44″E
- Owner: Public Transport Authority
- Operator: Transperth Train Operations
- Lines: Airport line Fremantle line
- Distance: 1.6 kilometres (0.99 mi) from Perth
- Platforms: 2 side
- Tracks: 2

Construction
- Structure type: Ground

Other information
- Fare zone: 1 /

History
- Opened: 18 June 1986
- Former names: West Perth

Passengers
- 2013–14: 514,121

Services
Preceding station	Transperth	Following station
Perth Terminus	Fremantle line	West Leederville towards Fremantle
Perth towards High Wycombe	Airport line	West Leederville towards Claremont
Location
- Location of City West station

City West railway station is a railway station on the Transperth network in Western Australia. It is located on the Fremantle line and Airport line, 1.6 kilometres from Perth station serving the suburb of West Perth.

== History ==
The original West Perth station opened in 1883 as North Perth. It was renamed West Perth in 1890. The station closed on 1 September 1979 along with the rest of the Fremantle line, re-opening on 29 July 1983 when services were restored. On 18 June 1986, a new West Perth station opened on the other side of the West Perth Subway. It was renamed City West on 19 November 1987 in conjunction with the opening of an adjacent Parry Corporation commercial development of the same name. It is now a major transport option for students of the nearby Perth Modern School.

Since the opening of the Airport line in 2022 and the Ellenbrook line in 2024, there has been a large increase in the trains travelling through City West station, which has led to consideration for replacing the pedestrian level crossings with an overpass or underpass.

== Services ==
City West station is served by Transperth Fremantle line services from Fremantle to Perth that continue through to Midland via the Midland line, and Airport line services from Claremont to High Wycombe.

It has received Airport line services since 10 October 2022.

City West station saw 514,121 passengers in the 2013–14 financial year.

== Platforms ==
City West platform arrangement
Stop ID	Platform	Line	Destination	Via	Stopping Pattern	Notes
99201	1	Fremantle line	Perth		All stations	
99201	1	Airport line	High Wycombe	Perth	W	
99202	2	Fremantle line	Fremantle		All stations	
99202	2	Airport line	Claremont		W	

== Bus routes ==
Stop	Route	Destination / description	Notes
Railway Street (west bound)	5 Green CAT	to Leederville station	
Railway Street (west bound)	81	to City Beach via Cambridge Street & Oceanic Drive	
Railway Street (west bound)	82	to City Beach via Cambridge Street & The Boulevard	
Railway Street (west bound)	83	to Wembley Downs via Grantham Street & Empire Avenue	
Railway Street (west bound)	84	to Wembley Downs via Grantham Street & Hale Road	
Railway Street (west bound)	85	to Glendalough Station via Cambridge Street & Herdsman Parade	
Railway Street (west bound)	906	Rail replacement service to Fremantle station	
Railway Street (east bound)	5 Green CAT	to Elizabeth Quay bus station via Colin Street & Malcolm Street	
Railway Street (east bound)	81, 82, 83, 84, 85	to Perth Busport	
Railway Street (east bound)	906	Rail replacement service to Perth station	
