= Wellington Street bus station =

Former bus station in Perth, Western Australia

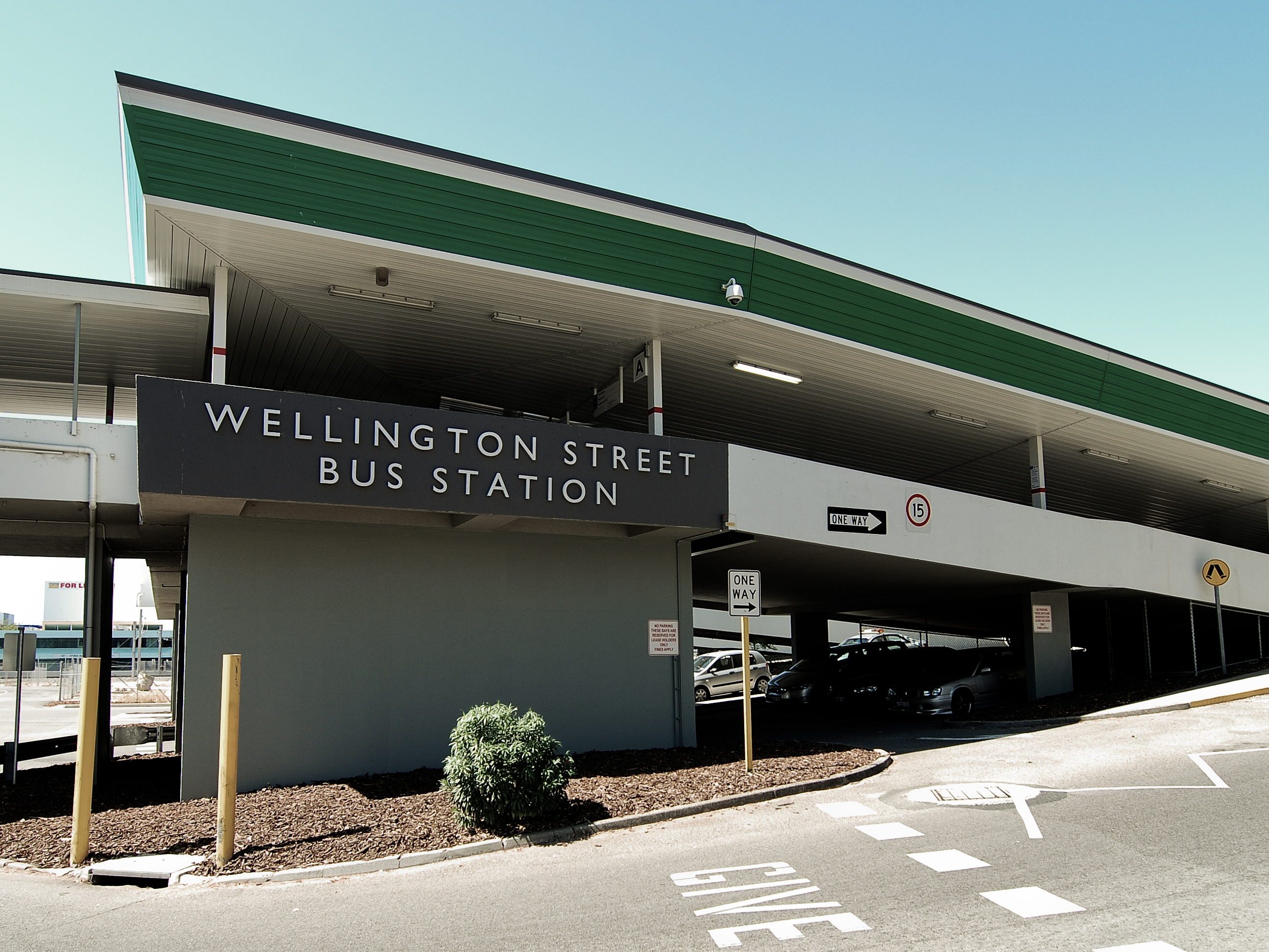
- Wellington Street bus station, 2010

General information
- Location: Wellington Street, Perth; Australia
- Coordinates: 31°57′02″S 115°51′25″E
- Owner: Public Transport Authority
- Operator: Transperth
- Bus routes: 34
- Bus stands: 17
- Connections: Train transfer at Perth station

Other information
- Fare zone: 1 /

History
- Opened: 2 March 1973
- Closed: 27 January 2014
- Former names: Perth Central
Location

Wellington Street bus station was a Transperth bus station located next to Perth railway station in the Perth central business district, Western Australia from 1973 until 2014. It was demolished to make way for Perth Busport.

== History ==
Construction began in September 1972. At the time, it was forecast to cost $300,000 to construct, and was to replace buses terminating on Murray Street. The bus station was opened on 2 March 1973 as Perth Central bus station by Premier John Tonkin. The final cost was $500,000. This was the first off-street central business district bus station in Australia. It was renamed Wellington Street bus station in 1989 to distinguish it from Esplanade Busport.

After just over 40 years of service, the majority of bus services were moved to the temporary Roe Street bus station on 12 January 2014. Wellington Street bus station remained in use for a further two weeks due to roadworks in the central business district, temporarily servicing Beaufort Street bus services, before finally closing on 27 January 2014 and being demolished soon after. The station was replaced by the new underground Perth Busport on the same site. To cater for the remaining bus services during the construction period, a temporary replacement Wellington Street bus station opened on 6 July 2014, occupying some of the original site. This closed on 1 February 2015.

It had 17 stands and was served by 34 Transperth routes operated by Path Transit, Swan Transit and Transdev WA.
