= Shenton Park railway station =

Railway station in Perth, Western Australia

Shenton Park
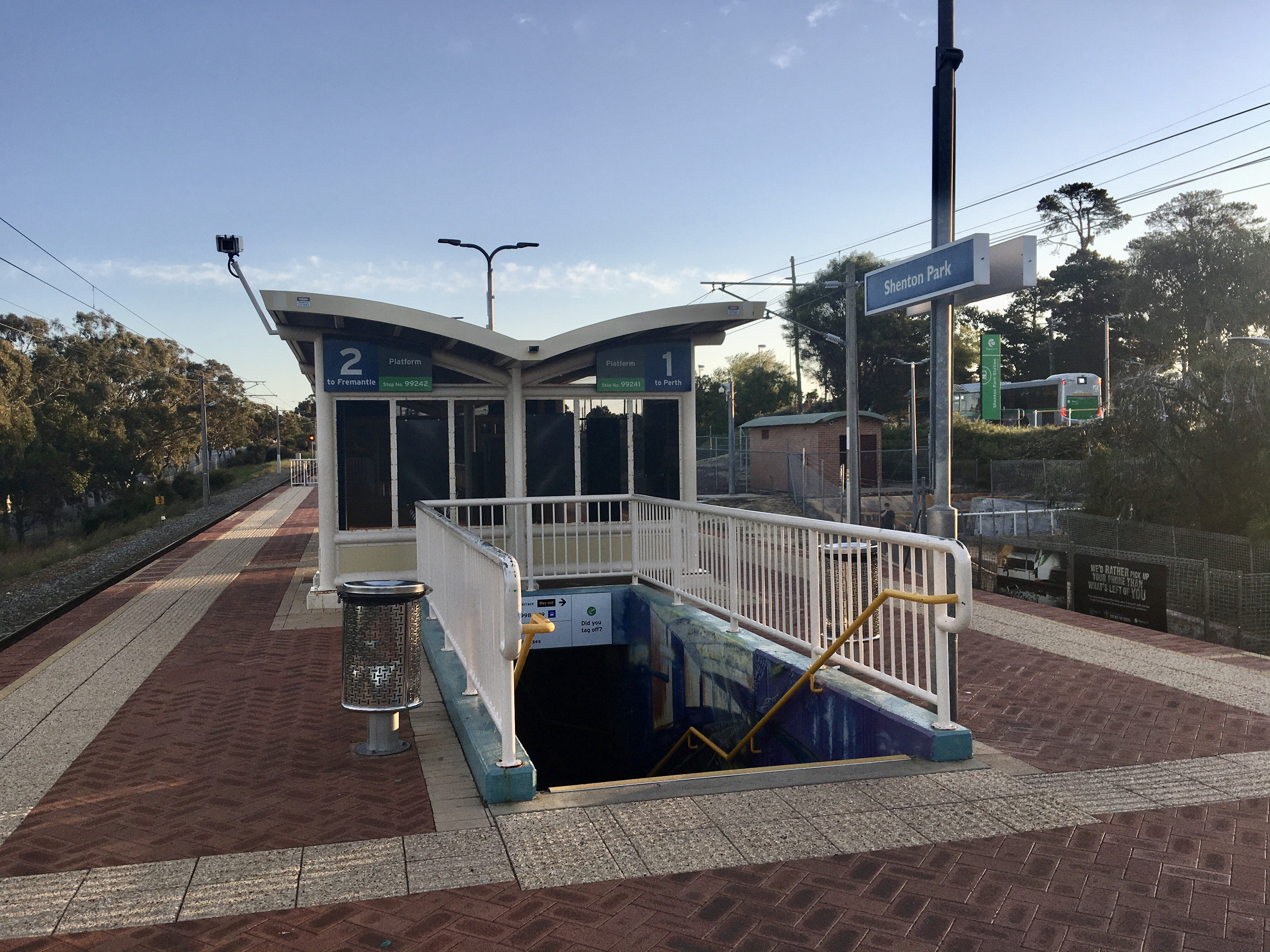
- Southbound view from Platform 2, showing station shelter and stairs to subway, December 2021

General information
- Location: Railway Road and Stubbs Terrace, Shenton Park; Western Australia; Australia
- Coordinates: 31°57′35″S 115°48′20″E
- Owner: Public Transport Authority
- Operator: Transperth Train Operations
- Lines: Fremantle line Airport line
- Distance: 6.0 kilometres (3.7 mi) from Perth
- Platforms: 2 platform faces with 1 island platform
- Tracks: 2

Construction
- Structure type: Ground

Other information
- Fare zone: 1

History
- Opened: 1 September 1908
- Former names: West Subiaco

Passengers
- 2013–14: 239,100

Services
Preceding station	Transperth	Following station
Daglish towards Perth	Fremantle line All	Karrakatta towards Fremantle
Daglish towards High Wycombe	Airport line All (W For Fremantle Line going to Claremont)	Karrakatta towards Claremont
Location
- Location of Shenton Park railway station

Shenton Park railway station (officially Shenton Park Station) is a commuter railway station in Shenton Park, a suburb of Perth, Western Australia. The station is on the Fremantle and Airport lines, which are part of the Transperth public transport network. It has an island platform, accessed by a pedestrian underpass. The station is only partially accessible due to a steep ramp. Services on each line run every 12 minutes during peak hour and every 15 minutes outside peak hour and on weekends and public holidays. At night, trains are every half-hour or hour. The journey to Perth railway station is 6.0 kilometres (3.7 mi), and takes 9 minutes.

== Description ==
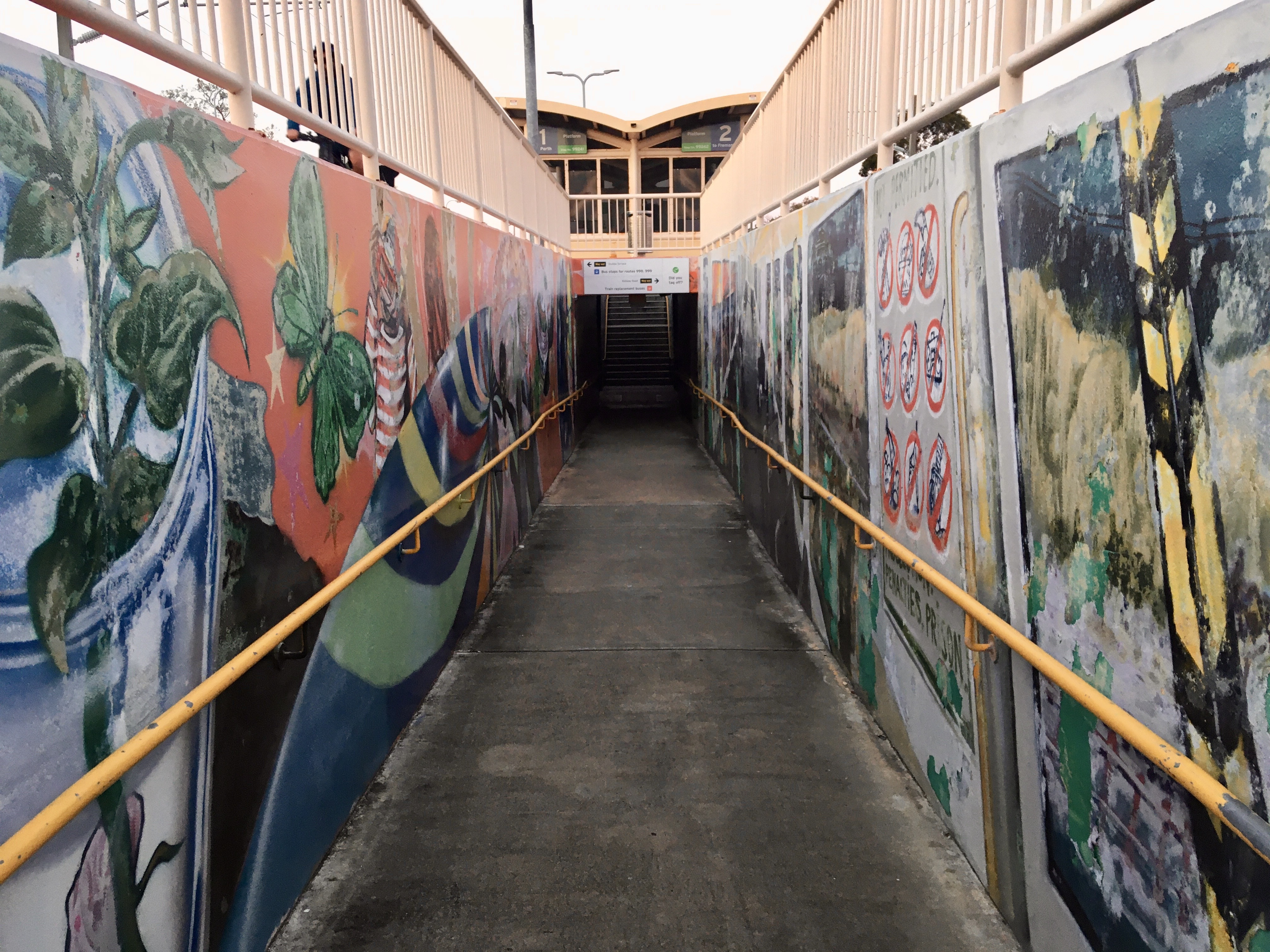
Shenton Park station ramp down to underpass

Shenton Park railway station is in Shenton Park, Western Australia, a suburb of Perth. It is located between Railway Road to the south-east, and Stubbs Terrace to the north-west. The station is 6.0 kilometres (3.7 mi), or a 9-minute train journey, from Perth railway station. The adjacent stations are Daglish railway station towards Perth, and Karrakatta railway station towards Fremantle.

The station consists of a single island platform with two platform faces. The platform is approximately 95 metres (312 ft) long, or long enough for a Transperth 4 car train, but not a 6 car train. At the southern half of the platform is a pedestrian underpass, accessible from the platform by a ramp and stairs. The station is not fully accessible as the underpass ramp is too steep.

== History ==
The Fremantle–Guildford railway line opened in 1881. On 1 September 1908, Shenton Park railway station opened, named West Subiaco railway station at the time. This came after years of the residents lobbying. At the opening was the Premier of Western Australia Newton Moore, the member of parliament for Subiaco and Mayor of Subiaco Henry Daglish, and the councillors of the Municipality of Subiaco.

In 1934, it was renamed to its present name. Initially, the government denied the municipal council's request for the name change, but it was eventually approved.

The station closed on 1 September 1979 along with the rest of the Fremantle line, re-opening on 29 July 1983 when services were restored.

The station received Airport line services from 10 October 2022.

As of 2026, the Public Transport Authority is investigating the potential for building an on-road bus interchange on Stubbs Terrace. From 2034, Shenton Park station's platforms are planned to be extended to the south-west to accommodate six-car trains.

== Services ==
Shenton Park station is served by the Airport and Fremantle lines on the Transperth network. Services are operated by Transperth Train Operations, a division of the PTA. The Fremantle line runs between Fremantle station and Perth station, continuing past Perth as the Midland line. The Airport line, which commenced regular services on 10 October 2022, goes between High Wycombe station and Claremont station.

Airport line and Fremantle line trains stop at Shenton Park every 12 minutes each during peak hour for a combined frequency of a train every 6 minutes. Outside peak hour and on weekends and public holidays, each line has a train every 15 minutes for a combined frequency of 7.5 minutes. Late at night, each line has a half-hourly or hourly frequency. The station saw 239,100 passengers in the 2013–14 financial year. In 2015, the station had 1,026 average weekday boardings.

On Stubbs Terrace is a pair of bus stops for routes 998 and 999, which are also known as the CircleRoute. Route 998 travels clockwise to Galleria Bus Station, and route 999 travels anticlockwise to Fremantle Station. It also have a route 25 which travels to Claremont Station via QEII Medical Centre. On Railway Road is a pair of rail replacement bus stops. These stops are served by route 906 when trains are not running.

Shenton Park platform arrangement
Stop ID	Platform	Line	Destination	Via	Stopping Pattern	Notes
99241	1	Fremantle line	Perth		All stations	
99241	1	Airport line	High Wycombe	Perth	W	
99242	2	Fremantle line	Fremantle		All stations	
99242	2	Airport line	Claremont		W	
