= Roe Street bus station =

Temporary bus station

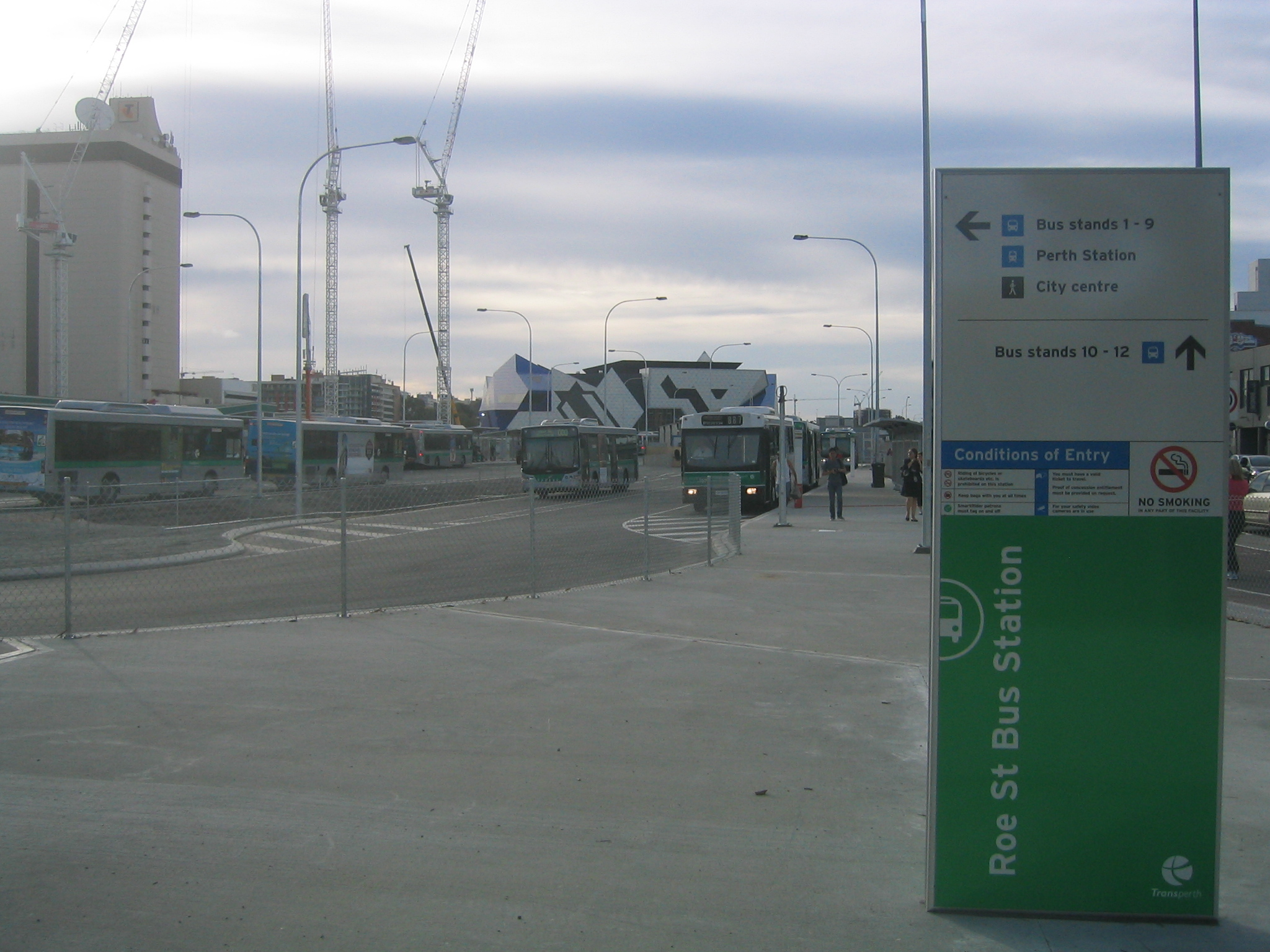

General information
- Location: Roe Street, Perth; Australia
- Coordinates: 31°56′58″S 115°51′25″E
- Owner: Public Transport Authority
- Operator: Transperth
- Bus routes: 25
- Bus stands: 12
- Connections: Train transfer at Perth railway station

Other information
- Fare zone: 1 /

History
- Opened: 12 January 2014
- Closed: 17 July 2016
Location

Roe Street bus station was a Transperth bus station located on Roe Street, next to Perth station in Western Australia which operated between 12 January 2014 and 17 July 2016.

== History ==
Roe Street bus station opened on 12 January 2014, as a temporary replacement for the closed Wellington Street bus station. Most services transferred to this station, while others were transferred to Esplanade Busport. A second temporary bus station was also constructed on Wellington Street to handle displaced services. It had 12 stands and was used by 25 Transperth routes. It closed on 17 July 2016 when Perth Busport began operating.
