= Jolimont, Western Australia =

Jolimont
- Suburb
- Interactive map of Jolimont
- Coordinates: 31.947°S 115.809°E
- Country: Australia
- State: Western Australia
- City: Perth
- LGAs: City of Subiaco; Town of Cambridge
- Location: 5 km (3.1 mi) W of Perth CBD

Government
  - State electorate: Nedlands
  - Federal division: Curtin

Area
  - Total: 0.7 km^{2} (0.27 sq mi)

Population
  - Total: 1,479 (SAL 2021)
- Postcode: 6014
Suburbs around Jolimont
Floreat	Wembley	Subiaco
Floreat	Jolimont	Subiaco
Shenton Park	Daglish	Daglish

Jolimont is a small western suburb of Perth, Western Australia, located within the City of Subiaco, although a small portion of the suburb is administered by the Town of Cambridge west of the CBD. The suburb is believed to be named after the Melbourne suburb of Jolimont, which was in turn named after "Jolimont" – the residence of Governor La Trobe. Its postcode is 6014.

Jolimont only has a small residential section, with most of its land area taken up with parks and sporting facilities, although its catchment area takes in blocks of flats on Cambridge Street, Wembley, and the entire suburb of Daglish. The suburb has a primary school and is served by the CircleRoute, as well as being near Daglish train station.

Jolimont is home to the Matthews Netball Centre and the Pat Goodridge Hockey Centre, as well as other courts and open spaces.

== Geography ==
Jolimont is a suburb approximately 5 kilometres (3.1 mi) west of the central business district (CBD) of Perth, the capital and largest city of Western Australia, and 5 kilometres (3.1 mi) east of the Indian Ocean. It is part of Perth affluent western suburbs. It is bounded to the north by Salvado Road, to the west by Selby Street, to the south by Dakin Street, Wilsmore Street, Roberta Street, Jersey Street and Troy Terrace, and to the east by Hay Street, Tighe Street, Upham Street and Bishop Street. To the north is Wembley, to the west is Floreat, to the south-west is Shenton Park, to the south is Daglish, and to the east is Subiaco.

Jolimont lies on Spearwood Dunes, which formed around 40,000 years ago. The dunes consist of brown sand lying over yellow subsoil, with Tamala Limestone below. These dunes are part of the greater Swan Coastal Plain. There is also a wetland in Jolimont called Jolimont Swamp, which is part of Mabel Talbot Park.

== History ==
Prior to European settlement, the area was inhabited by the Mooro group of the Whadjuk Noongar people. They were led by Yellagonga and inhabited the area north of the Swan River, as far east as Ellen Brook and north to Moore River. Lakes and wetlands across the region, including within the Jolimont Swamp, were a source of food for them, and are places of spiritual importance.

Around the 1930s as a result of the Great Depression, camps of Aboriginal people appeared around the outskirts of Perth as these people moved to Perth in search of work. A report in 1937 recommended that a camp in Jolimont be disbanded. A freshwater spring in the south-west of Jolimont Swamp was a permanent camp for Clara Layland, an elder and custodian of knowledge known to the Noongar people as the "Daglish granny". Other Aboriginal people camped there until the mid-20th century.

== Demographics ==
Jolimont had a population of 1,479 at the 2021 Australian census. This is an increase from the 1,402 recorded during the 2016 census, the 1,200 recorded at the 2011 census, the 1,005 recorded at the 2006 census and the 963 recorded at the 2001 census. According to the 2021 census, 44.4% of residents were male, and 55.6% were female. The median age was 52, which is significantly above the state and national average of 38. 10.1% of residents were above the age of 85. The eastern part of the suburb, where the St. Ives Centro Retirement Village is located, has a median age of 81 years. The area west of Jersey Street and north of Hay Street has a median age of 45, and the area south of Hay Street has a median age of 34.

The most common ancestries that people identified with at the 2021 census were English (43.3%), Australian (32.2%), Irish (12.5%), Scottish (12.0%), and Chinese (5.5%). 64.6% of residents were born in Australia. The next most common birthplaces were England (6.8%), China (1.9%), Bhutan (1.8%), India (1.8%), and South Africa (1.8%). 37.5% of residents had both parents born overseas, and 42.8% of residents had both parents born in Australia. 79.4% of residents spoke only English at home, and 16.1% of households had a non-English language spoken. Other languages spoken included Mandarin (2.9%), other southern Asian languages (Note: "Other southern Asian languages" means all southern Asian languages excluding Dravidian and Indo-Aryan languages.) (1.8%), Persian (1.1%), French (1.0%), and Japanese (1.0%). The most common religious affiliations were no religion (42.8%), Anglican (16.9%), Catholic (16.6%) and Uniting Church (3.6%).

== Education ==
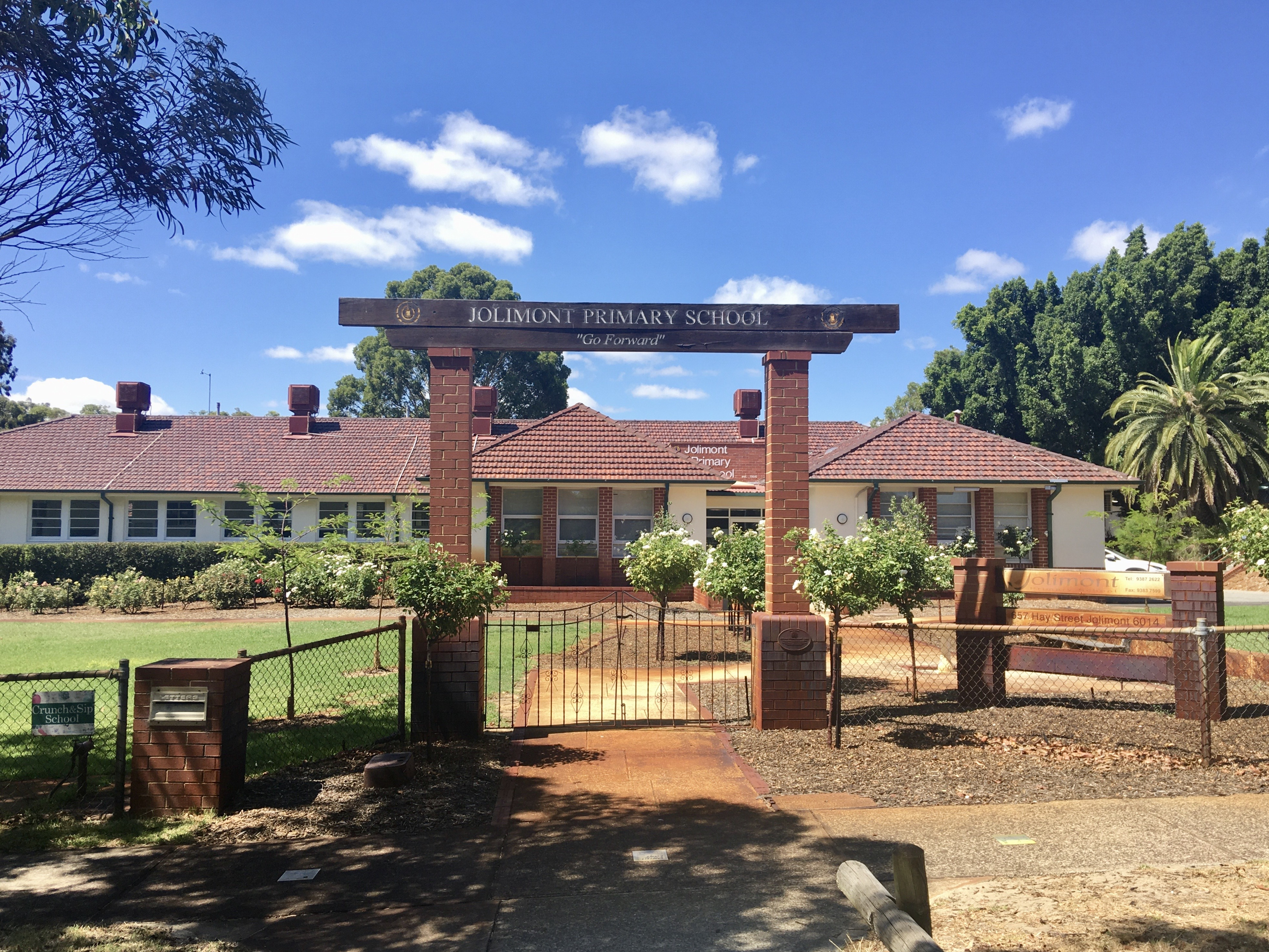
Jolimont Primary School

Jolimont Primary School is the only school in the suburb. This school is a public school that serves students from Kindergarten to Year 6. As of 2026 semester 1, it has 31 Kindergarten students and 389 students from Pre-Primary to Year 6, which is 420 total students.

Upon its formation in the late 1890s, the Jolimont Progress Organisation began petitioning the Education Department for a school to be constructed in Jolimont. The Subiaco Municipal Council supported the progress organisation with this in March 1899, and in mid-1899, the Education Department approved the construction of a school in the area, and the site was soon chosen as well. It took until July 1905 for a contract for the school's construction to be awarded. It was given to J. Lake at a cost of £450 GBP. The school building was a single room brick and iron classroom of a standard design by the Public Works Department. It was completed in September 1905, and opened on 9 October 1905 to an enrolment of 15 students.

The school had an average attendance of 62 by mid-1906, and so a new classroom was constructed by contractor F. L. Gurr, identical to the first one, at a cost of £349. Surrounding the school was native bushland, and the students often helped to fight fires that occurred in the bushland. By the middle of 1914, the average attendance was 112. Overcrowding lead to a "pavilion classroom" being constructed in 1916, and another in 1919. One of these was later removed in 1930. In 1921, the Jolimont Parents Association was formed, which helped with fundraising and improving the school grounds.

In the 1930s and during World War II, the school's population remained steady, but after the end of the war, it rapidly increased. In 1946, the school leased the adjacent Jolimont Hall, and in 1948, the school was renovated and expanded. Two classrooms, a head teacher's office and a staffroom were built. The original classrooms were renovated and the corrugated iron roofs were replaced with tiles. These improvements were completed by 1950, at which time the school had an enrolment of 287. In 1955, three new classrooms were added. Over the next few decades, the number of students declined as new schools opened nearby and the demographics of the area changed. The lowest numbers were recorded in the 1980s, but they started to increase again in the 1990s. The school had several buildings constructed across the 1990s and 2000s. Transportable classrooms were installed in 1993 and 1999. An undercover assembly area, canteen and sports storerooms were built in 2000. A pavilion classroom was constructed in 2001. A new library and administration centre was constructed in 2005, along with upgrades to other facilities. More classrooms were built in 2010 as part of the federal government's Building the Education Revolution program.

Shenton College is the nearest public high school. It has 2,582 students from Year 7 to Year 12, and is less than 2 kilometres (1.2 mi) south of Jolimont.

== Governance ==
=== Local ===
Jolimont north of Hay Street, west of Perry Lane, and north of Pollen Grove, including Henderson Park, is part of the Town of Cambridge. The rest of Jolimont is part of the City of Subiaco. Within the City of Subiaco, Jolimont is part of the North Ward. Councillors for the North Ward are Stephanie Stroud and Rosemarie de Vries, whose terms expire in 2023. The Mayor of Subiaco is David McMullen, whose term expires in 2025. Within the Town of Cambridge, Jolimont is part of the Wembley Ward. Councillors for the Wembley Ward are Kate Barlow and Alaine Haddon-Casey, whose terms expire in October 2023, and Gary Mack and Rob Fredericks, whose terms expire in October 2025. The Mayor of Cambridge is Keri Shannon, whose term expires in 2023.

=== State and federal ===
For the Western Australian Legislative Assembly (lower house), Jolimont is part of the electoral district of Nedlands. This seat is part of the North Metropolitan Region of the Western Australian Legislative Council (upper house). The current member for Nedlands is Katrina Stratton, of the Australian Labor Party, the main centre-left party in Australia. Prior to the 2021 election, the Liberal Party of Australia, the main centre-right party, had held the seat every year since 1950. Jolimont is within the division of Curtin for the Australian House of Representatives. The member for Curtin is the Liberal Party's Celia Hammond. This is a safe seat for the Liberal Party. The only polling place in Jolimont is at Jolimont Primary School. This polling place tends more towards away from the Liberal Party than the rest of the district of Nedlands and the division of Curtin, but it still leans more towards the Liberal Party than the rest of the state or country.

2021 state election Source: WAEC
Labor	36.0%
Liberal	31.6%
Greens	17.8%
Independent	7.1%
Independent	1.8%

2017 state election Source: WAEC
Liberal	48.7%
Labor	26.7%
Greens	15.2%
Micro Business	3.0%
Christians	1.9%

2013 state election Source: WAEC
Liberal	55.2%
Labor	16.5%
Greens	12.2%
Independent	11.1%
Christians	1.2%

2008 state election Source: WAEC
Liberal	39.7%
Independent	25.5%
Labor	15.7%
Greens	14.5%
CDP	0.9%

2019 federal election Source: AEC
Liberal	48.1%
Labor	21.9%
Greens	17.2%
Independent	8.5%
Western Australia	1.9%

2016 federal election Source: AEC
Liberal	61.1%
Greens	17.8%
Labor	16.9%
Liberty Alliance	2.1%
Independent	2.1%

2013 federal election Source: AEC
Liberal	60.1%
Labor	18.4%
Greens	17.5%
Palmer United	2.6%
Rise Up Australia	0.8%

2010 federal election Source: AEC
Liberal	57.6%
Greens	21.2%
Labor	19.5%
CDP	1.7%

== Transport ==
Two major roads travel through Jolimont: Hay Street and Selby Street. Hay Street is angled east –west. Travelling on it east from Jolimont leads to Subiaco, Thomas Street, the Mitchell Freeway, and the Perth central business district (CBD). Travelling on it west leads to West Coast Highway. Selby Street is angled north –south. Travelling on it south leads to Shenton College and Claremont. Travelling on it north leads to Wembley, and eventually Innaloo and Stirling. Less major distributor roads are Salvado Road, leading east to the Mitchell Freeway and the Perth CBD, and Jersey Street, providing a link inside Jolimont.

Public transport is provided under the Transperth brand name. The nearest railway stations to Jolimont are Shenton Park, Daglish and Subiaco railway stations, all of which are on the Fremantle line and less than 2 kilometres (1.2 mi) from Jolimont. The bus routes in Jolimont are routes 28, 998 and 999. Route 28 travels between Perth Busport and Claremont station on the Fremantle line, via Hay Street. Routes 998 and 999, also known as the CircleRoute, are a pair of bus routes which travel in a circle around Perth. Route 998 is clockwise, and route 999 is anticlockwise. They travel through Jolimont along Selby Street. To the south, they link up to Shenton Park station and Claremont. To the north, they lead to Innaloo and Stirling. Less than 200 metres (660 ft) to the north of Jolimont is Cambridge Street, on which routes 81, 82 and 85 run. These routes lead to Perth Busport.

=== Bus ===
- 28 Perth Busport to Claremont Station – serves Hay Street and Selby Street
- 998 Fremantle Station to Fremantle Station (limited stops) – CircleRoute Clockwise, serves Selby Street
- 999 Fremantle Station to Fremantle Station (limited stops) – CircleRoute Anti-Clockwise, serves Selby Street
