= Daglish railway station =

Railway station in Perth, Western Australia

Daglish
- Daglish station in April 2026

General information
- Location: Railway Road and Stubbs Terrace; Daglish / Subiaco; Western Australia; Australia
- Coordinates: 31°57′06″S 115°48′48″E
- Owner: Public Transport Authority
- Operator: Public Transport Authority
- Lines: Fremantle line Airport line
- Distance: 4.9 kilometres (3.0 mi) from Perth
- Platforms: 1 island platform with 2 platform edges
- Tracks: 2

Construction
- Parking: 2 car parks, 58 bays total
- Accessible: Partial
- Architectural style: Federation Bungalow

Other information
- Fare zone: 1

History
- Opened: 14 July 1924

Passengers
- 2013–14: 186,725

Services
Preceding station	Transperth	Following station
Subiaco towards Perth	Fremantle line	Shenton Park towards Fremantle
Subiaco towards High Wycombe	Airport line	Shenton Park towards Claremont
Location
- Location of Daglish station

Daglish railway station is a suburban railway station in Daglish and Subiaco, suburbs of Perth, Western Australia. Opened on 14 July 1924, the station was named after Henry Daglish, who had been a mayor of Subiaco, a member for the electoral district of Subiaco, and a premier of Western Australia in the 1900s. Daglish was a resident of Subiaco for 22 years before he died in 1920. The station consists of an island platform accessed by a pedestrian underpass. Two small buildings are on the platform which operated as a parcels office and ticket office until 1970. The station is only partially accessible due to a steep access ramp and lack of tactile paving.

Daglish station is on the Fremantle and Airport lines, which are part of the Transperth public transport network. Services on each line run every 12 minutes during peak hour and every 15 minutes outside peak hour and on weekends and public holidays. At night, trains are every half-hour or hour. The journey to Perth station is 4.9 kilometres (3.0 mi) and takes 7 minutes.

== Description ==
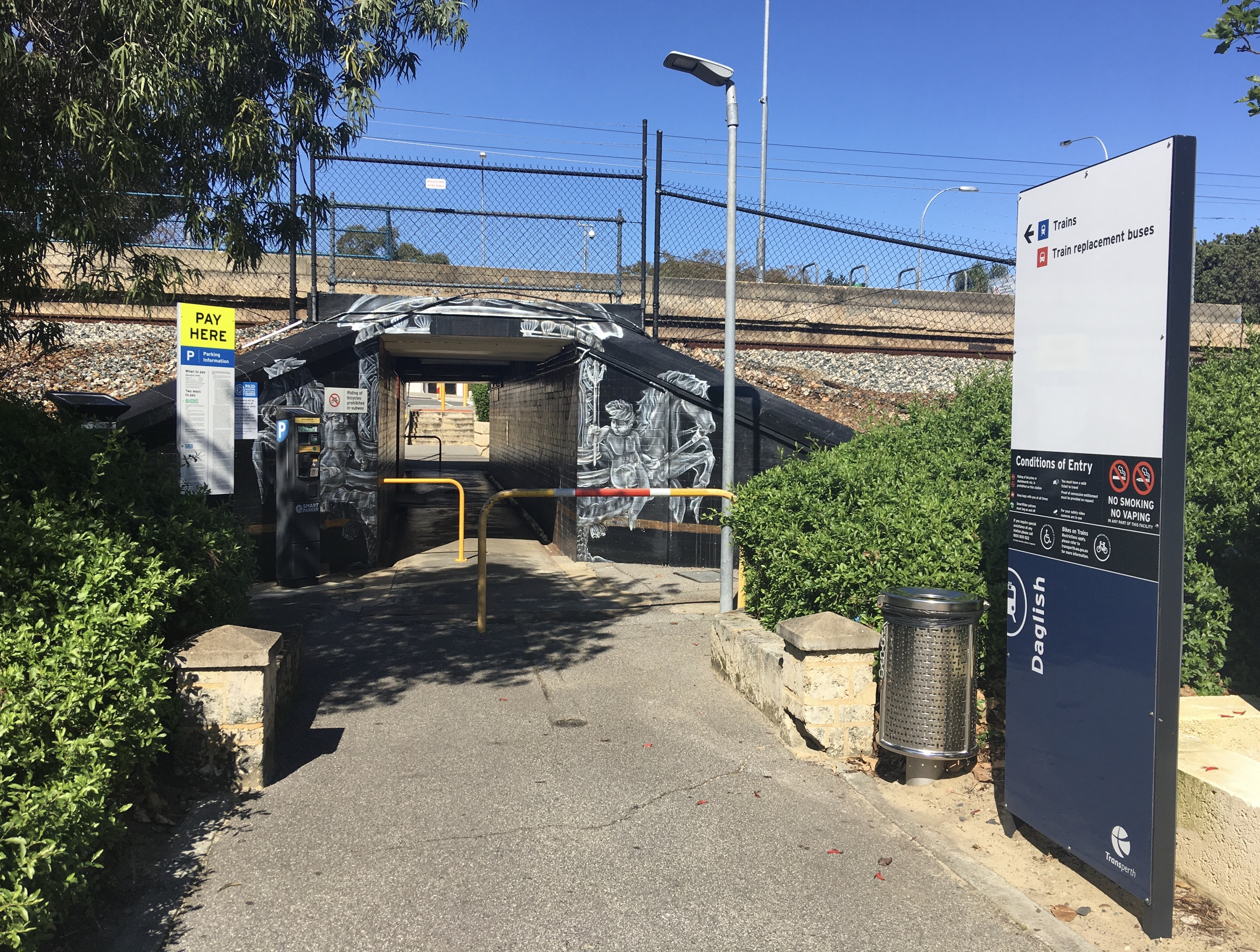
Northern underpass entrance

Daglish station is on the boundary of Daglish and Subiaco, suburbs of Perth, Western Australia. Parallel to the south-east is Railway Road and to the north-west is Stubbs Terrace. It is owned by the Public Transport Authority (PTA), a state government agency, (Note: The PTA succeeded the Western Australian Government Railways as the owner and operator of the rail network in 2003.) and is part of the Transperth system. The station is 4.9 kilometres (3.0 mi), or a 7-minute train journey, from Perth station. The adjacent stations are Subiaco station towards Perth or High Wycombe, and Shenton Park station towards Fremantle or Claremont.

The station consists of a single island platform with two platform edges. The platform has an asphalt surface with concrete on the edges. It is approximately 100 metres (330 ft) long, enough for a Transperth four-car train but not a six-car train. From about 2034, the platform is planned to be lengthened to 150 metres (490 ft) in the eastern direction to accommodate six-car trains. At the south-west end of the platform is a pedestrian subway, accessed from the platform by a ramp. On the platform are two small red brick buildings under a single terracotta tiled roof. Between them is an undercover area for seating. The buildings display elements of the Federation Bungalow architectural style. The station building, platform, and underpass are largely the same as when originally built, with the main change being that the doors and windows are bricked in. Surrounding Daglish station is an ornamental garden, including a hedge that spells "DAGLISH". There are car parks on both sides of the station, with a total of 58 bays. The station is listed as an "assisted access" station on the Transperth website, as the access ramp is too steep and there is no tactile paving.

Immediately south-west of the station is a single-ended turnback siding. It was used by trains operating special event services for Subiaco Oval until the stadium was closed in 2017. Trains would park there before heading to West Leederville station to pick up passengers. Since December 2024, the siding has been used by Ellenbrook line trains, which do not stop at Daglish station or any other station between Daglish and Perth. The turnback has capacity for five trains per hour, so an additional turnback will be needed for that line to achieve six trains per hour, which is planned in 2031.

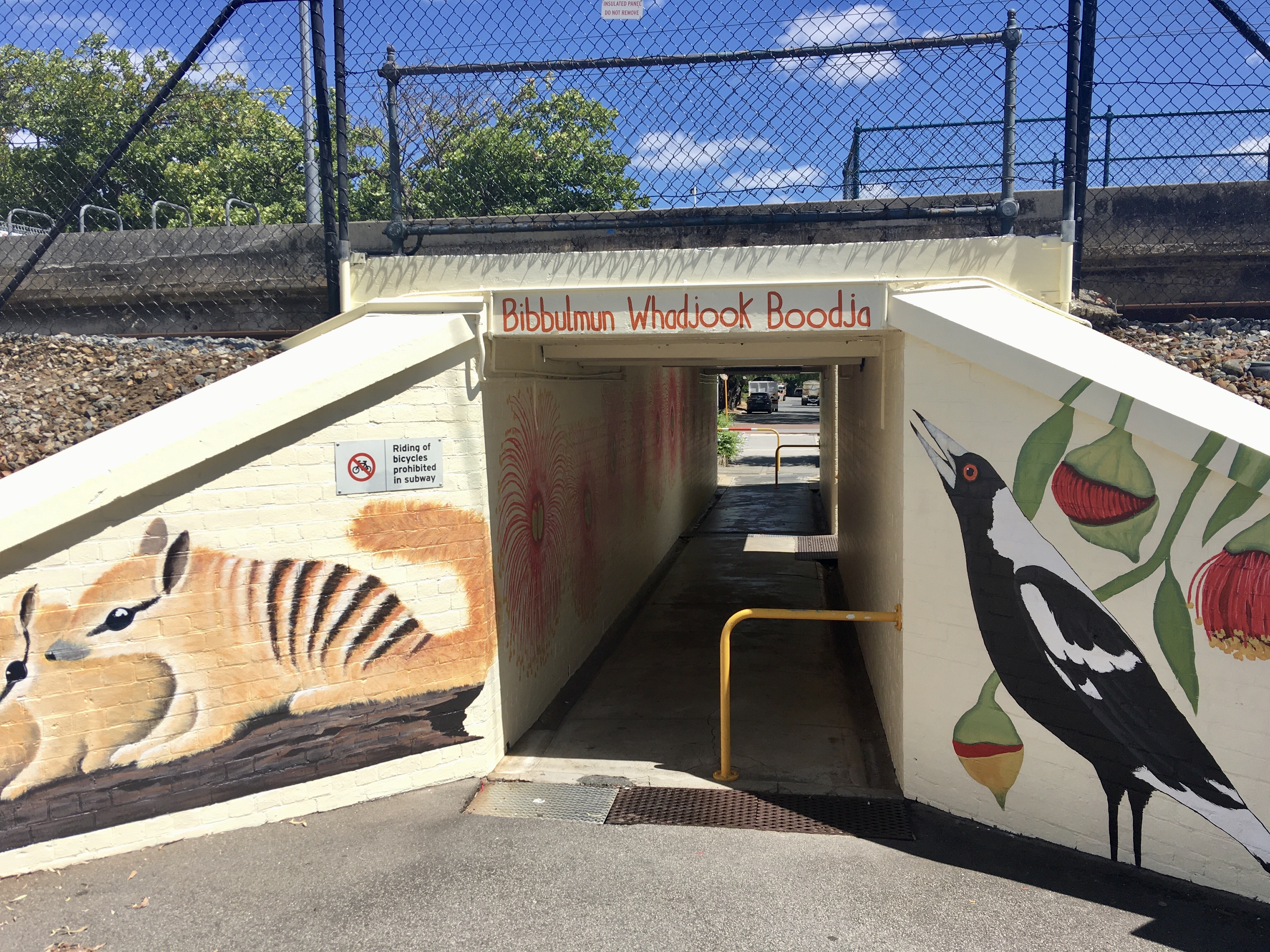
Untitled artwork on the underpass by Tjyllyungoo and Trish Robinson

There is one piece of public art at Daglish station: an untitled mural along the station's underpass installed in 2021 by Noongar artist Tjyllyungoo, also known as Lance Chadd, and Trish Robinson. The mural represents the local flora and fauna.

== History ==
By 1920, the Subiaco community wanted a railway station in the southern part of Subiaco. The Subiaco Municipal Council started lobbying the Government of Western Australia for a station to be built near Lawler Street. In 1922, after many meetings between the premier, the minister for railways, and the mayor of Subiaco, Walter Richardson, the government promised that the station would be built. The station was constructed during 1923 and the first half of 1924, during which time the station was often called Lawler Street station, although the station was actually slightly south of that street. It opened on 14 July 1924, and was named after Henry Daglish, who was a mayor of Subiaco, a member for the electoral district of Subiaco, and a premier of Western Australia in the 1900s. Daglish was a resident of Subiaco for 22 years before he died in 1920.

In 1925, the Municipality of Subiaco acquired the land north-west of the station. Previously planned to be used as a rail yard, the council planned to create a residential suburb there named Daglish. The development of the suburb spanned the following two decades. Until the 1940s, Daglish station served as a freight depot, which is the reason for McCallum Avenue being so wide. Car parks at Daglish station were built in the 1960s, with the Stubbs Terrace car park built around 1966–67 and the Railway Road car park built in 1969.

From the opening date of the station until 31 January 1970, a station master worked at Daglish station, working from 8 am to 4 pm. A total of four station masters worked there over the course of its history. An assistant station master also worked from 4 pm to midnight, but that position was abolished in October 1962. On 31 January 1970, the then-operator of the railway network, the Western Australian Government Railways, closed the station's parcels and ticket offices due to changes to the way that freight was handled. The windows and doors to the station building were filled in with bricks, and the building is now occupied by electrical equipment. The station closed on 1 September 1979 along with the rest of the Fremantle line. It re-opened on 29 July 1983 when services on the Fremantle line were restored.

A B-series train leaves the Daglish siding

In May 2007, the turnback siding was opened between the mainline tracks south-west of the station, permitting the reversal of six-car trains moving special event crowds to and from Subiaco Oval. Since 10 October 2022, the station has been served by Airport line services in addition to the pre-existing Fremantle line services, and since the Ellenbrook line opened in December 2024, trains on that line have used the Daglish siding to reverse direction without stopping at the station. There have been complaints from local residents regarding the noise generated by trains entering and exiting the siding regularly.

Planned future upgrades include extending the platform to 150 metres (490 ft), a new underpass, and an upgraded platform for better accessibility. There have been reports of cracks in the concrete platform and underpass structure, which local residents have claimed could result in the closure of Daglish station.

== Services ==
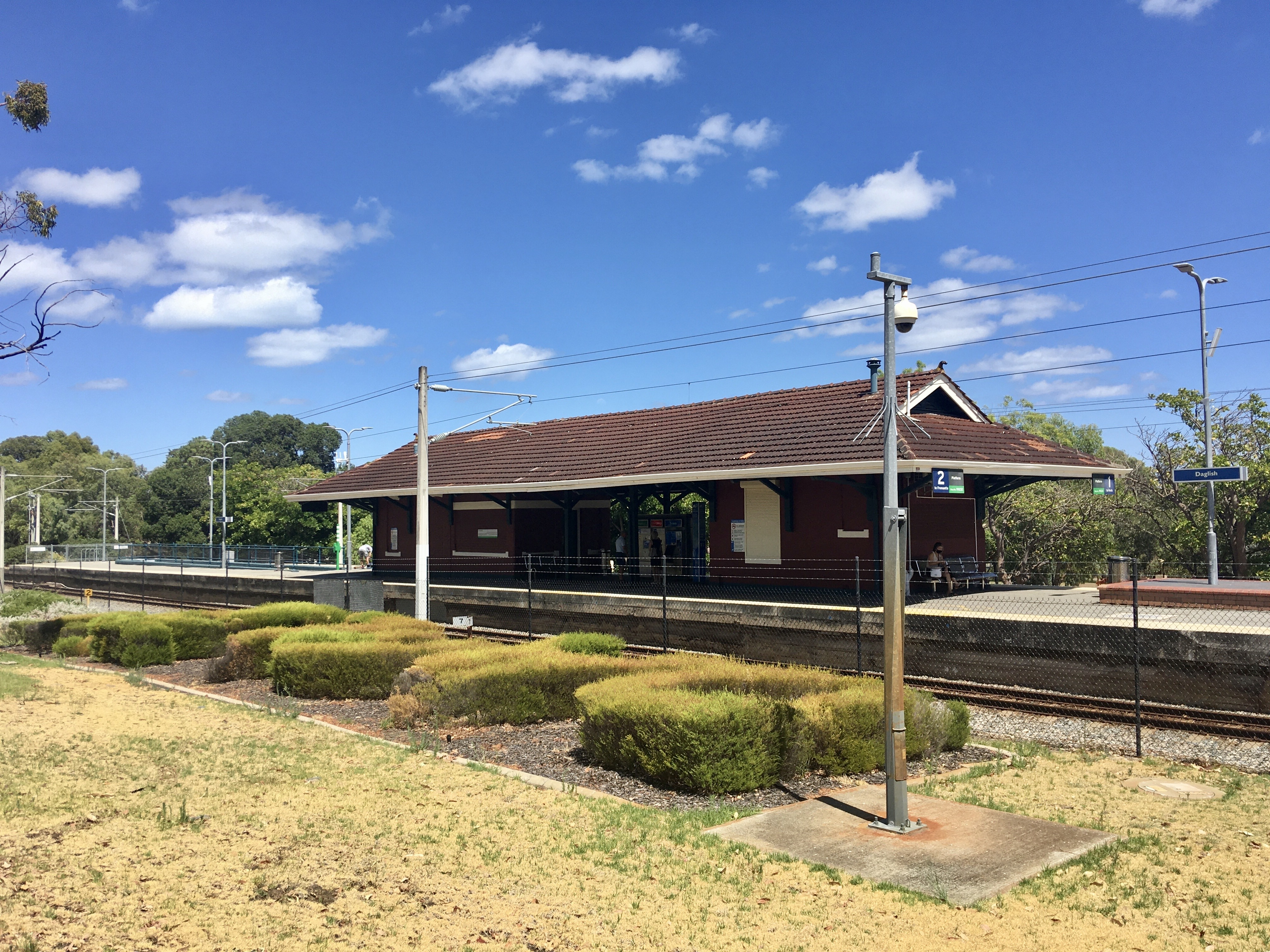
Daglish station platform viewed from Railway Road. The hedges in the foreground spell out DAGLISH.

Daglish station is served by the Airport and Fremantle lines on the Transperth network. Services are operated by the PTA. The Fremantle line runs between Fremantle station and Perth station, continuing past Perth as the Midland line. The Airport line goes between High Wycombe station and Claremont station.

Airport line and Fremantle line trains stop at Daglish five times per hour each during the peak period, combining for a ten train per hour frequency. Outside peak hour and on weekends and public holidays, trains on each line stop at Daglish four times per hour and late at night, each line stops at the station one or two times per hour. Daglish station had 186,725 passengers in the 2013–14 financial year. In 2015, the station had 644 average weekday boardings, making it the 50th busiest station out of the 69 Transperth stations at the time.

On Railway Road next to the station are a pair of bus stops. These are served by route 27, which runs between East Perth and Claremont station. These are also served by rail replacement bus route 906 when trains are not running.
