= Western suburbs (Perth) =

Suburbs in Perth, Western Australia

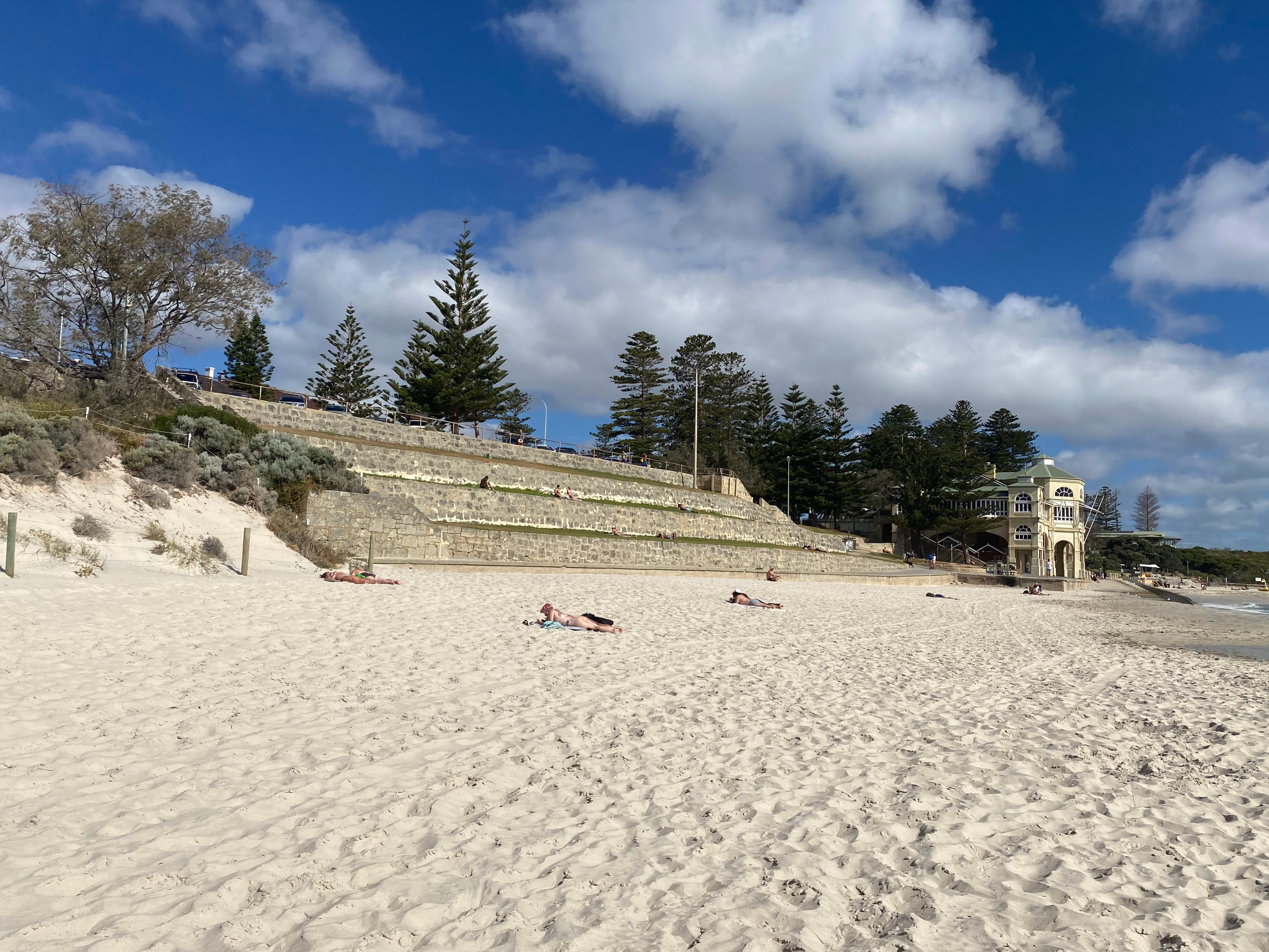
Cottesloe Beach

The western suburbs (also known as the golden triangle) are an informally defined group of suburbs of Perth, Western Australia, located west of the city's central business district and north of the Swan River. The western suburbs are well known for high incomes, high house prices, riverfront mansions, private schools and proximity to ocean beaches.

== Governance ==
=== Local ===
Local governments/councils in the western suburbs:

- Town of Cambridge
- Town of Claremont
- Town of Cottesloe
- Town of Mosman Park
- City of Nedlands
- Shire of Peppermint Grove
- City of Subiaco

Local governments/councils partially in the western suburbs:

- City of Fremantle
- City of Perth
- City of Stirling

The western suburbs contains some unusually small local governments. The Shire of Peppermint Grove is the smallest one in Australia, at 1.1 square kilometres (0.42 sq mi). The Towns of Cottesloe, Claremont and Mosman Park are also quite small, at 3.9 km^{2} (1.5 sq mi), 4.9 km^{2} (1.9 sq mi) and 4.3 km^{2} (1.7 sq mi) respectively.

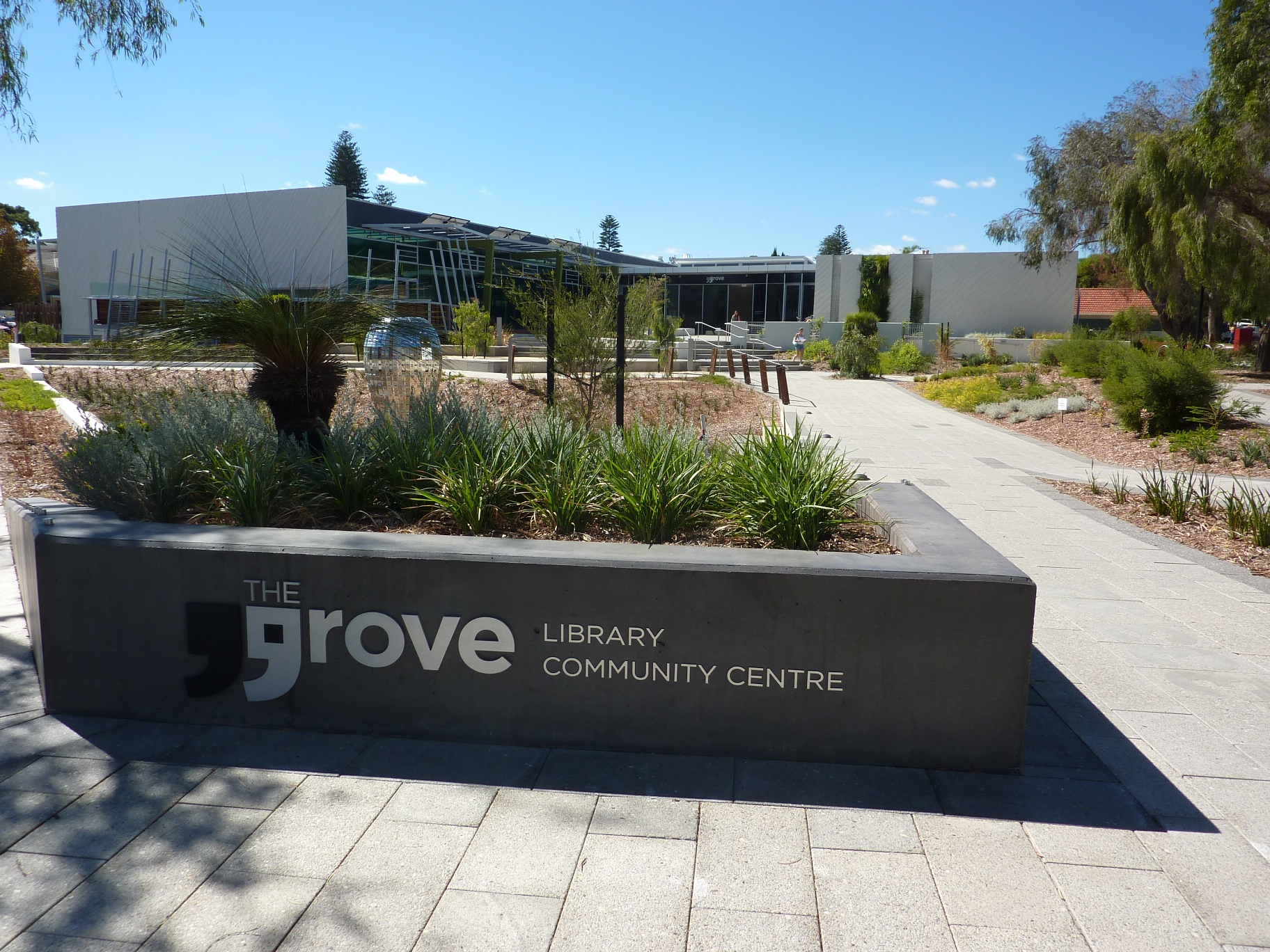
The Grove Library, jointly managed by Cottesloe, Mosman Park and Peppermint Grove councils

Due to the small size of some local councils, some provide shared services such as libraries and rubbish collection as it's impractical to do so individually. The councils of Cottesloe, Mosman Park and Peppermint Grove jointly fund and manage The Grove Library. In addition, the councils of Claremont, Nedlands and Subiaco, as well as the aforementioned councils form the Western Suburbs Library Group, which have a shared catalogue and membership database. The councils of Cambridge, Claremont, Cottesloe, Mosman Park, Peppermint Grove and Subiaco provide a shared rubbish collection service, under the Western Metropolitan Regional Council.

Proposals to merge local governments in the western suburbs are generally met with opposition from residents. Most recently in 2014, when the Barnett Government released the Local Government Advisory Board report on metropolitan local government reform recommending the amalgamation of Claremont, Cottesloe, Mosman Park, Nedlands and Peppermint Grove into a new council tentatively named the City of Riversea, and the absorption of Cambridge and a small part of Stirling into Subiaco, as part of a wider plan to reduce the number of councils in Perth from 30 to 16, the councils involved opposed the mergers, with the Shire of Peppermint Grove even spending ratepayer funds on launching legal action. In 2015, the proposal was scrapped.

=== State ===
The state electoral districts of Churchlands, Cottesloe and Nedlands cover the western suburbs. These electoral districts were some of the safest seats in the state for the Liberal Party, until WA Labor swept to power in 2021 on the back of Mark McGowan's COVID19 related policies.

=== Federal ===
The Division of Curtin covers the western suburbs. Kate Chaney is the division’s current federal politician.

== Suburbs ==
Suburbs of the western suburbs, with local government in brackets:

- City Beach (Cambridge)
- Churchlands (Stirling)
- Claremont (Claremont)
- Crawley (Nedlands, Perth)
- Daglish (Subiaco)
- Dalkeith (Nedlands)
- Floreat (Cambridge)
- Jolimont (Cambridge, Subiaco)
- Karrakatta (Nedlands)
- Mosman Park (Mosman Park)
- Mount Claremont (Cambridge, Nedlands)
- Nedlands (Nedlands)
- North Fremantle (Fremantle)
- Peppermint Grove (Peppermint Grove)
- Scarborough (Stirling)
- Shenton Park (Nedlands, Subiaco)
- Subiaco (Subiaco)
- Swanbourne (Nedlands)
- Wembley (Cambridge, Stirling)
- Wembley Downs (Cambridge, Stirling)
- West Leederville (Cambridge)

Of these suburbs, nine were in Perth's top ten most expensive suburbs as of 2021. Those suburbs, starting from the most expensive, were Peppermint Grove, Dalkeith, Cottesloe, City Beach, Nedlands, Claremont, Swanbourne, Floreat and Mosman Park. As of 2021, all of the western suburbs had a median house price above $1,000,000 (save for Karrakatta, for which there was no data). At the top end, Peppermint Grove had a median price of $2,995,000, while Wembley Downs had the lowest median price of $1,117,500.

== Media ==
The western suburbs have two local newspapers: the local print edition of Seven West Media's PerthNow and The Post, which is independent.

== Education ==
Private schools in the western suburbs include Christ Church Grammar School, Hale School, Iona Presentation College, John XXIII College, Methodist Ladies' College, Newman College, Presbyterian Ladies' College, Scotch College and St Hilda's Anglican School for Girls. These schools are some of the most prestigious, high achieving and expensive schools in Western Australia.

There is currently a shortage of public high schools in the western suburbs. In 2000, Hollywood Senior High School and Swanbourne Senior High School were merged to form Shenton College, and in 2005, City Beach Senior High School was shut down. This meant that the only comprehensive high schools in the western suburbs after 2005 were Churchlands Senior High School and Shenton College. In the 2010s, the student enrolment at these schools increased rapidly. As of 2021, these two schools have the highest number of students of any school in Western Australia, at 2,797 and 2,404 respectively. Churchlands had a record of 34 transportable classrooms in 2018. In 2020, Bob Hawke College opened to alleviate some of the pressure on these two schools. The school is planned to have a capacity of 2,000 students in 2025.

The only other public high school in the western suburbs is Perth Modern School, which is the state's only fully-selective public high school, and has students from all over Perth.

== See also ==
- List of Perth suburbs
