= Daglish, Western Australia =

Daglish
- Suburb
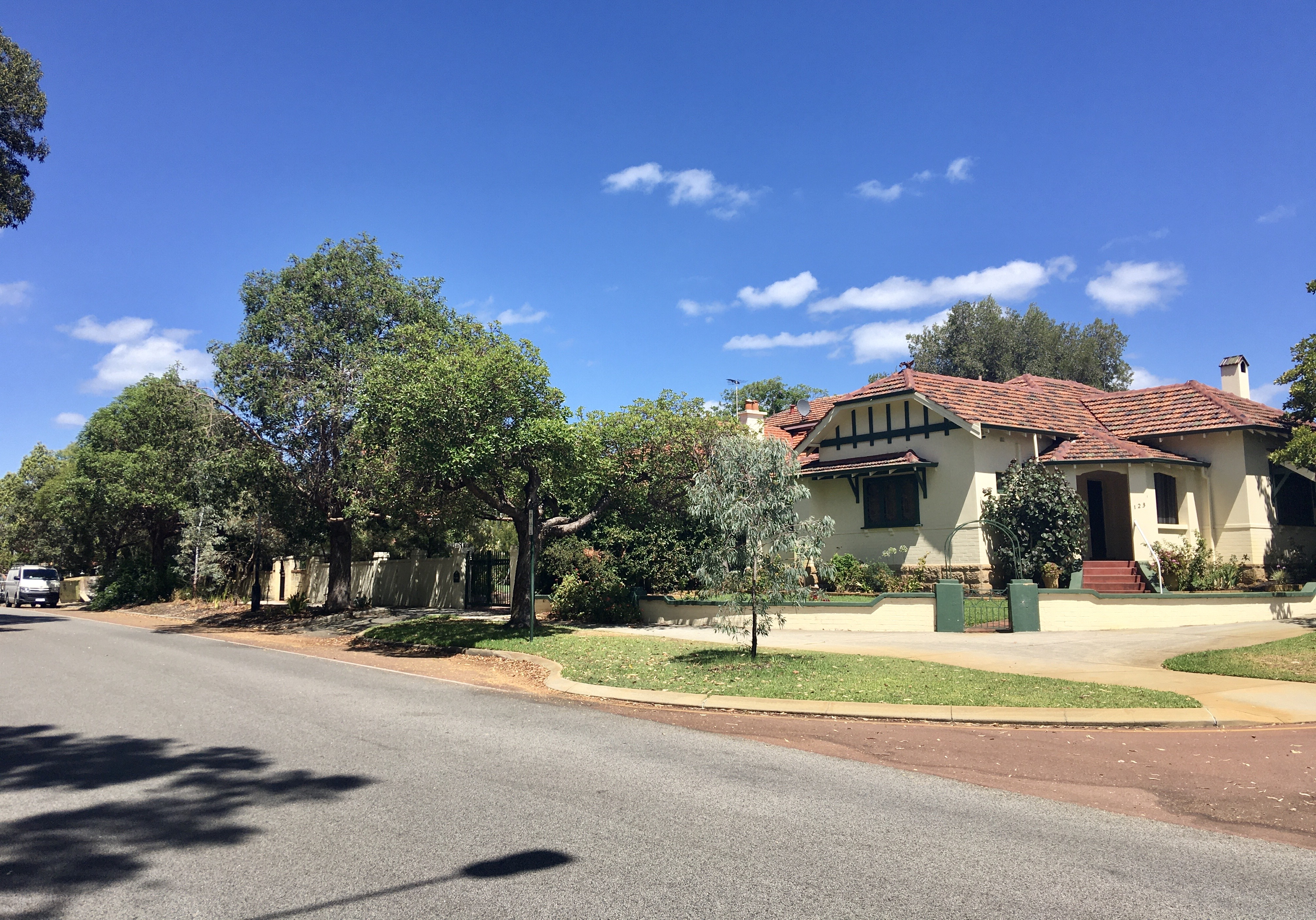
- Stubbs Terrace
- Interactive map of Daglish
- Coordinates: 31°57′04″S 115°48′33″E
- Country: Australia
- State: Western Australia
- City: Perth
- LGA: City of Subiaco
- Location: 5 km (3.1 mi) W of Perth

Government
  - State electorate: Nedlands
  - Federal division: Curtin
- Elevation: 26 m (85 ft)

Population
  - Total: 1,551 (SAL 2021)
- Postcode: 6008
Suburbs around Daglish
Shenton Park	Jolimont	Subiaco
Shenton Park	Daglish	Subiaco
Shenton Park	Shenton Park	Subiaco

Daglish is a small western suburb of Perth, the capital of Western Australia. It is approximately 4 kilometres (2.5 mi) west of the Perth central business district, and within the City of Subiaco local government area. It was named after Henry Daglish, who was the mayor of Subiaco, member for the electoral district of Subiaco and premier of Western Australia from 1904 to 1905. The Daglish railway station opened in 1924 in response to population growth in the neighbouring suburb of Subiaco. The following year, the Municipality of Subiaco bought the land west of the railway station to sell for housing. Development occurred over the following 20 years. The initial development next to the railway station used the garden suburb principles, with large lots and gardens, curved streets, and lots of green space. Today, the suburb has significant heritage value due to its uniform streetscape, with most original homes still standing. It has a population of 1,419 as of the 2016 Australian census.

== Geography ==
Daglish is a suburb located approximately 4 kilometres (2.5 mi) west of the central business district (CBD) of Perth, the capital and largest city of Western Australia, and 5 kilometres (3.1 mi) east of the Indian Ocean. It is part of Perth's affluent western suburbs. Daglish is bounded to the south-east by Railway Road, to the south by Lonnie Street, to the west by Selby Street, and to the north by Dakin Street, Wilsmore Street, Roberta Street, Jersey Street, Troy Terrace and Hay Street. To the east is the suburb of Subiaco, to the south and west is Shenton Park, and to the north is Jolimont.

Daglish lies on Spearwood Dunes, which formed around 40,000 years ago. The dunes consist of brown sand lying over yellow subsoil, with Tamala Limestone below. These dunes are part of the greater Swan Coastal Plain. Low-lying areas of Charles Stokes Park and Cliff Sadlier VC Memorial Park were wetlands.

== History ==
Prior to European settlement, the area was inhabited by the Mooro group of the Whadjuk Noongar people. They were led by Yellagonga and inhabited the area north of the Swan River, as far east as Ellen Brook and north to Moore River. Lakes and wetlands across the region, including low-lying areas of Charles Stokes Park and Cliff Sadlier VC Memorial Park, were a source of food for them, and are places of spiritual importance.

In 1871, a railway line between Fremantle and Guildford was first proposed, following on from the success of railways in Sydney and Melbourne. In 1874, two possible routes were suggested: one traveling north of the Swan River, and one travelling south of the river. In July 1878, the northern route was chosen. Construction on the railway began in 1879, and it was opened on 1 March 1881, as the Fremantle to Guildford railway line.

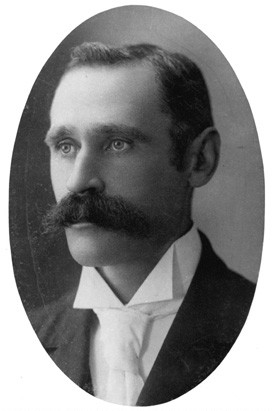
Henry Daglish is the namesake of the railway station and suburb of Daglish

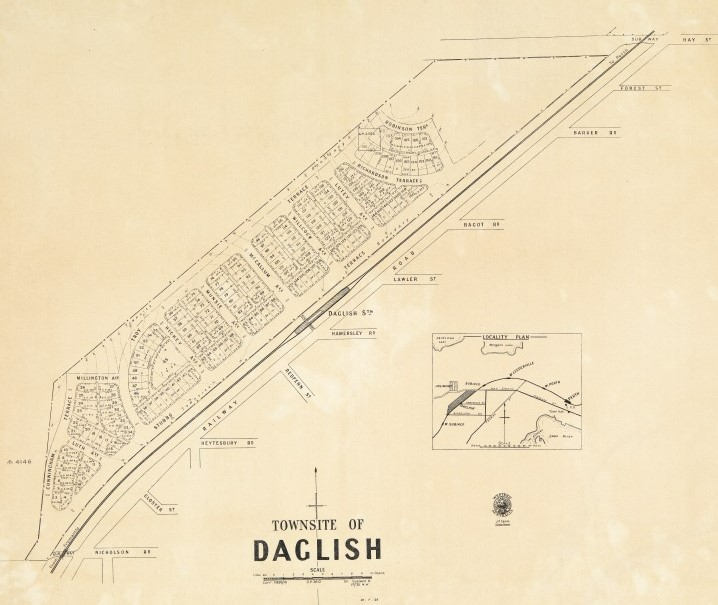
Map of Daglish in 1925

In response to population growth in Subiaco, Daglish railway station opened in 1924. It was named after Henry Daglish, who was a former mayor of Subiaco, member for the electoral district of Subiaco and premier of Western Australia. Daglish was a resident of Subiaco for 22 years before he died in 1920.

In 1925, the Subiaco Council negotiated with the minister for works to acquire the land east of the station to create a suburb also named Daglish. The suburb was subdivided and sold, mainly to young couples, attracted to the proximity to King Edward Memorial Hospital for Women which was just across the railway line, and railway workers who commuted to the Midland Railway Workshops. The land sold covered the area bounded by Stubbs Terrace, Cunningham Terrace, Millington Avenue, Troy Terrace and Robinson Terrace. The land was more expensive than neighbouring suburb West Subiaco (now called Shenton Park), but still cheaper than most areas of Perth. The following year, the council negotiated with the Water Supply for the suburb to be connected to the water mains. The electricity network was also extended to the suburb.

Initial development was slow, with less than a dozen houses were completed by 1928. The first area developed was the area nearest to the railway station. The suburb was surrounded by bushland to the west and the north. A few roads were surfaced with slag; the rest were just sand tracks, which frequently caused vehicles to get bogged. The development of the suburb was done under the garden suburb principles, with large areas of public open space, and curved streets. All homes were made of brick, and most homes did not have a front fence. Architectural styles used include Inter-War Californian Bungalow, Old English, Mediterranean and Spanish Mission, Functionalist and Art Deco.

In 1928, the townsite of Daglish was declared. In 1933, the Workers' Home Board, which was the state's public housing authority, chose Daglish as a suitable site for its development. Over the following years, many homes in Daglish were built by the Workers' Home Board. The board's involvement meant that houses were built to a high standard. From 1935 to 1945, streets further away from the station such as Troy Terrace, Robinson Terrace and Cunningham Terrace were developed.

The 1955 Plan for the Metropolitan Region, Perth and Fremantle, also known as the Stephenson–Hepburn Report, proposed a railway line to Whitfords branching off the Fremantle line in Daglish. When the Metropolitan Region Scheme was adopted in 1963 though, the land for the railway line was not reserved. The Stephenson–Hepburn Report also proposed the development of the University of Western Australia's endowment lands, some of which covered Daglish. This came to fruition with the extension of Cunningham Terrace north-east of Millington Avenue and the development of land between Troy Terrace and Cunningham Terrace. The new development had a different character to the earlier sections of Daglish, with flats mixed in with houses. A large area of land north-west of Cunningham Terrace, used as a water compensation basin, was turned into a park in 1969 and 1970. This is now known as Cliff Sadlier VC Memorial Park. The final part of Daglish to be developed was the land north-west of the park, which was subdivided and sold in the early 1970s. This was fully filled in with houses by the end of the 1980s. In the early 1980s, the City of Subiaco sealed all laneways in Daglish, which were previously made of dirt.

Today, most of the original homes are still standing. The uniform streetscape is rare compared to many other older areas of Perth, where houses have been demolished to make way for newer buildings. It is the only remaining example in Western Australia of the garden suburb movement. The City of Subiaco established the Daglish Conservation Area on 4 February 2003 to recognise the heritage of Daglish, and the National Trust of Western Australia declared Daglish as a place of cultural heritage significance in July 2019. These heritage listings do not apply restrictions on the development of property in the suburb. In 2017, the City of Subiaco proposed that parts of Daglish be designated as Heritage Areas under a new town planning scheme. This would have introduced restrictions in order to preserve the heritage of Daglish, however, after feedback from the community, this proposal did not eventuate. Due to its proximity to a train station, Daglish was listed by the state government as a possible place for infill and high density development, however the Subiaco council does not support this.

== Demographics ==
Historical population
Year	Pop.	±% p.a.
2001	1,215	—
2006	1,242	+0.44%
2011	1,494	+3.76%
2016	1,419	−1.02%
2021	1,551	+1.79%
Source: ABS

Daglish's population at the 2021 Australian census was 1,551. 50.3% of residents were male and 49.7% were female. The median age was 39, above the state and national average of 38.

Of Daglish's 606 dwellings, 361 were detached houses, 117 were semi-detached houses, and 128 were flats or apartments. The average number of bedrooms was 2.9 and the average number of people per household was 2.4. 35.2% of dwellings were owned outright, 28.4% were owned with a mortgage, 33.1% were rented, and 1.7% were some other tenure type.

The median weekly personal income at the 2021 census for Daglish residents was A$957, the median weekly family income was $3,109, and the median weekly household income was $2,134, which were all above the state and national averages. Professionals and managers were the most common professions for those employed living in Daglish, at 47.4% and 12.6% of residents respectively. Community and personal service workers were 11.0%, clerical and administrative workers were 9.1%, and sales workers were 6.4%. Blue collar workers were low, with technicians and trades workers at 5.4%, labourers at 5.0%, and machinery operators and drivers at 2.3%. Major industries that residents worked in were hospitals (7.7%), engineering design and consulting services (4.0%), higher education (3.7%), primary education (3.2%), and takeaway food services (3.1%). 53.6% of residents aged over 15 had a bachelor's degree or above, significantly higher than the state average of 23.8% and the national average of 26.3%.

The most common ancestries that Daglish residents identified with at the 2021 census were English (39.5%), Australian (30.5%), Irish (10.9%), Scottish (10.9%), and Chinese (7.9%). The most common countries of birth were Australia (61.3%), England (7.5%), Malaysia (2.1%), China (2.0%), New Zealand (1.9%), and India (1.3%). 35.5% of residents had both parents born in Australia and 44.2% of residents had both parents born overseas. 54.3% of residents had no religious affiliation, 14.0% were Catholic, 9.3% were Anglican, and 3.0% were Buddhist.

== Parks and amenities ==
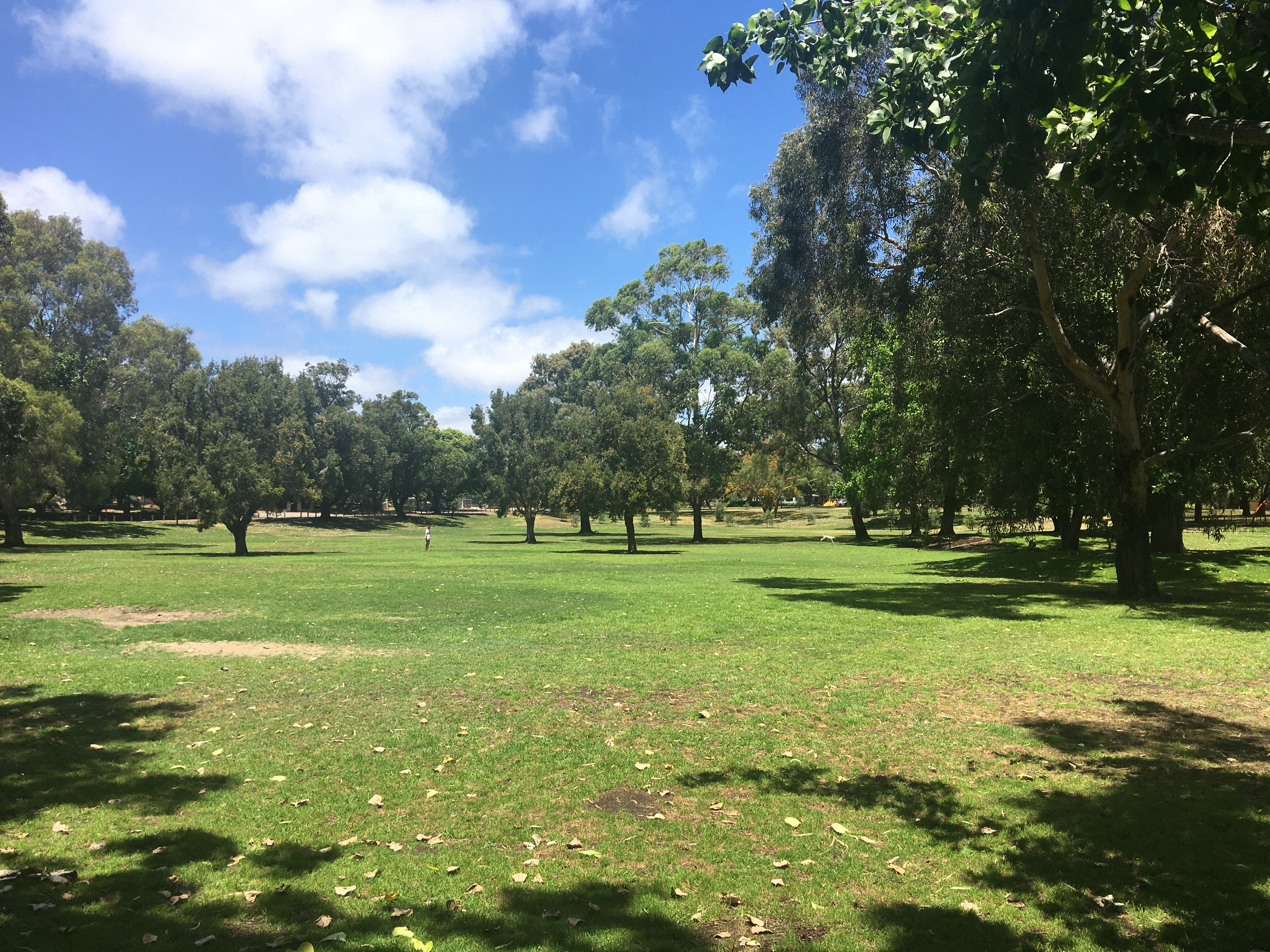
Cliff Sadlier VC Memorial Park

The largest park in Daglish is the Cliff Sadlier VC Memorial Park. It was originally a water compensation basin, controlled by the Metropolitan Water Supply, Sewerage and Drainage Board. Before Daglish's development, the area was a small wetland. Known unofficially by locals as "Daglish Park", it was neglected and littered with rubbish. The City of Subiaco received permission to turn it into a park in 1969. Grassing and planting of ornamental trees was mostly complete by the end of 1970, with paths, fitness equipment and a playground added over the following years. At first, it was known as Daglish Reserve, but in 1980, it was renamed to its present name, in honour of Clifford Sadlier, who was a Victoria Cross recipient and resident of Subiaco. To this day, the park is still a water compensation basin. The park floods during large rainfall events. Since 2020, the City of Subiaco has been working on turning a stormwater conveyance channel into a "living stream". The benefits of this are an improvement in water quality, better flood and erosion control, a better ecosystem, and better aesthetics.

Other parks in Daglish are Charles Stokes Reserve, named after Sergeant Charles Stokes, who served in World War I, Daglish Park, Hickey Avenue Park and McCallum Park. At Hickey Avenue Park is Daglish Tennis Club. Formerly known as Hillcrest Tennis Club, it formed in 1930. With only three courts, it is the smallest tennis club in Perth.

== Education ==
Daglish does not contain any schools, however there are several schools close by. Daglish is in the catchment area of Jolimont Primary School, which is just north of the suburb. Jolimont Primary School is a public school for students from Kindergarten to Year 6. The suburb is also within the catchment area of Shenton College, which is just west of Daglish. Shenton College is a public school for students from Year 7 to Year 12.

== Governance ==
=== Local ===
Daglish lies within the North Ward of the City of Subiaco local government area. Councillors for the North Ward are Rosemarie de Vries, whose term ends in 2029, and Russell Jones, whose term ends in 2027. The mayor of Subiaco is David McMullen, whose term expires in 2029.

=== State and federal ===
For the Western Australian Legislative Assembly (lower house), Daglish is part of the electoral district of Nedlands. The current member for Nedlands is Jonathan Huston, a former Liberal member who left the party to become an independent. Daglish is within the division of Curtin for the Australian House of Representatives. The member for Curtin is Kate Chaney, a teal independent. This was formerly a safe seat for the Liberal Party. The closest polling place to Daglish is at Jolimont Primary School. This polling place tends more towards away from the Liberal Party than the rest of the district of Nedlands and the division of Curtin, but it still leans more towards the Liberal Party than the rest of the state or country.

== Transport ==
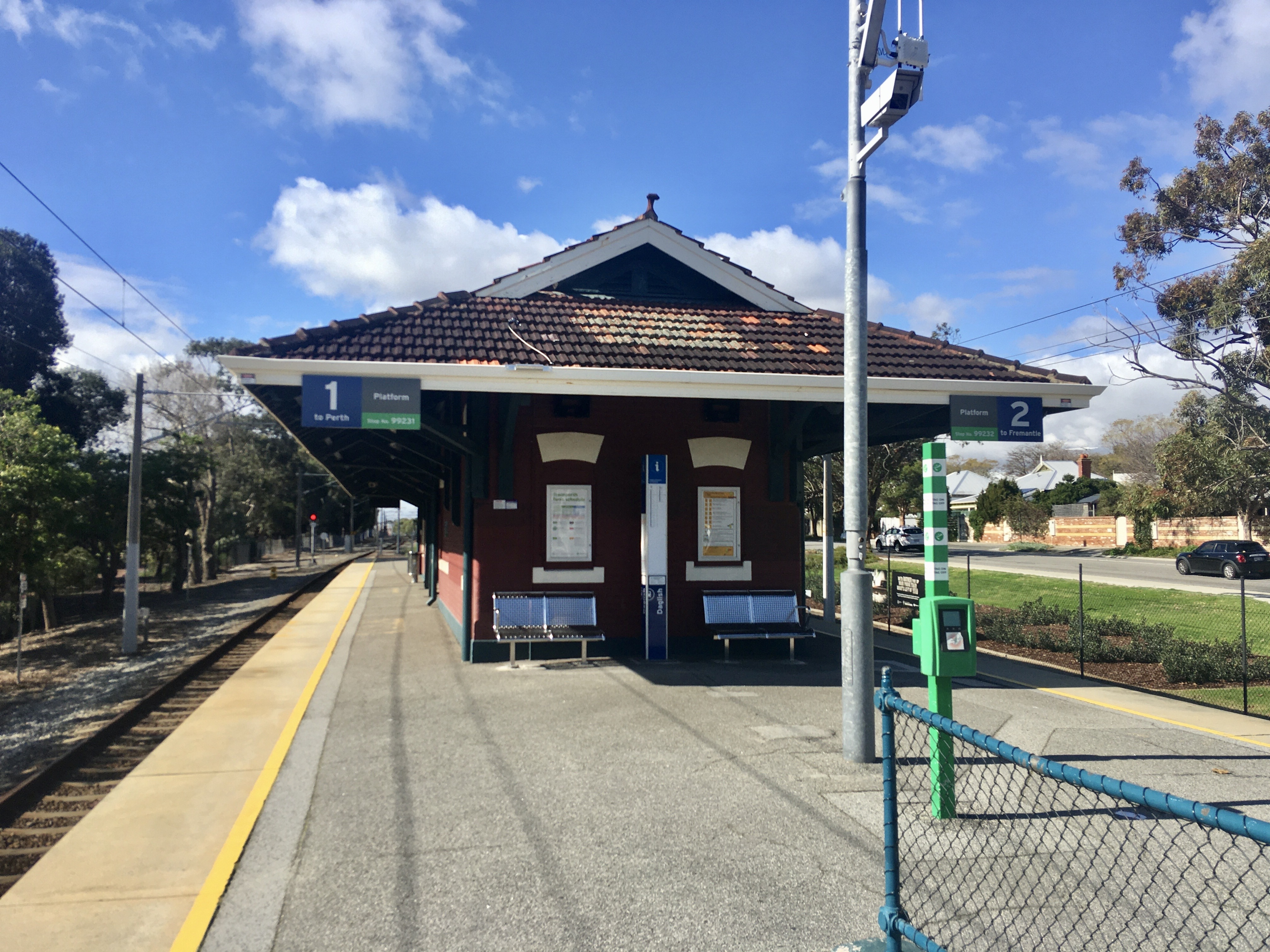
Daglish railway station in August 2022

At the 2021 census, 53.5% of Daglish residents travelled to work in a car, compared to the state average of 68.8%; 16.1% travelled to work on public transport, compared to the state average of 7.4%; and 5.0% walked to work, compared to the state average of 2.2%.

Three major roads travel through Daglish: Hay Street, Nash Street, and Selby Street. Hay Street is angled east –west. Travelling on it east leads to Thomas Street, the Mitchell Freeway, and the Perth CBD. Nash Street is also angled east–west. It commences at Selby Street, and heads east, over the railway line, changing name to Nicholson Road, before reaching Thomas Street. Selby Street is angled north–south. Travelling on it north leads to Wembley, and eventually Innaloo and Stirling.

Daglish railway station is a station along the Fremantle line and Airport line located on the southern edge of Daglish. Bus routes in Daglish are routes 27, 28, 998 and 999. Route 27 travels between East Perth and Claremont railway station via Nash Street. Route 28 travels between Perth Busport and Claremont station, via Hay Street. Routes 998 and 999, also known as the CircleRoute, are a pair of bus routes which travel in a circle around Perth. Route 998 is clockwise, and route 999 is anticlockwise. They travel through Daglish along Selby Street.
