= Shenton Park, Western Australia =

Shenton Park
- Suburb
- Interactive map of Shenton Park
- Coordinates: 31.959°S 115.806°E
- Country: Australia
- State: Western Australia
- City: Perth
- LGAs: City of Subiaco; City of Nedlands
- Location: 4 km (2.5 mi) W of Perth

Government
  - State electorate: Nedlands
  - Federal division: Curtin

Area
  - Total: 3.4 km^{2} (1.3 sq mi)
- Elevation: 20 m (66 ft)

Population
  - Total: 4,638 (SAL 2021)
- Postcode: 6008
Suburbs around Shenton Park
Floreat	Daglish	Subiaco
Mount Claremont	Shenton Park	Kings Park
Karrakatta	Nedlands	Crawley

Shenton Park is a suburb of Perth, Western Australia, located within the City of Nedlands and City of Subiaco and 4 km (2.5 mi) west of the central business district. Its postcode is 6008. The suburb is named after the park that it contains, Shenton Park, which was named after George Shenton who originally owned the land that is now the suburb of Shenton Park.

== Geography and natural history ==
Shenton Park is a suburb approximately 4 kilometres (2.5 mi) west of the central business district (CBD) of Perth, the capital and largest city of Western Australia. It is 5 kilometres (3.1 mi) east of the Indian Ocean, and is part of Perth's affluent western suburbs. Shenton Park is bounded to the south by Aberdare Road and the Irwin Barracks, to the west by Brockway Road, to the north by Underwood Avenue, Selby Street, Lonnie Street and Nicholson Road, and to the east by Thomas Street. To the south is Nedlands and Karrakatta, to the west is Mount Claremont, to the north is Floreat, Jolimont, Daglish and Subiaco, and to the east is Kings Park. Shenton Park is divided into two parts by the Fremantle railway line: the eastern part is part of the City of Subiaco and is mostly residential; the western part is mostly bushland, commercial buildings and Shenton College.

Shenton Park lies on Spearwood Dunes, which formed around 40,000 years ago. The dunes consist of brown sand lying over yellow subsoil, with Tamala Limestone below. These dunes are part of the greater Swan Coastal Plain.

Birds such as laughing kookaburra, red-tailed black-cockatoo, long-billed corella, lorikeets, Australian pelican, black swan among others can frequently be seen in the suburb especially at Jualbup Lake. The Lake is also home to long neck turtles and motorbike frogs. The bushland near Shenton College is home to indigenous bats with purpose built bat boxes in an effort to protect them from non-indigenous birds.

== History ==
Shenton Park is named after George Shenton, who served three terms as Mayor of Perth in the 19th century and owned land in the area.

The Shenton Park Hotel was constructed in 1907 and closed in 1999. It was located on the corner of Nicholson Road, Shenton Park, and Derby Road, Shenton Park. It had been owned by the Swan Brewery between 1937 until 1981. It was a popular live music venue, hosting popular Australian bands such as The Triffids. It was converted into a retirement village between 2000 and 2003, which officially opened as "Shenton Village" in April 2004.

Nicholson Road was also the site of the Army Drill Hall, built in 1915. It used by the 11/44 Battalion of Royal Western Australia Regiment, the Red Cross Voluntary Aid Detachment and Cadet Corps as a training and social centre. The property extended to Keightley Road and included a parade ground. An aerial photograph kept on the State Library of Western Australia is here: Aerial photograph of the Army drill hall HQ of the Eleventh Battalion Royal Western Australia Regiment Nicholson Road Subiaco 7 June 1968 - JPG 503.0 KB The Army Drill Hall was sold in 1989 and demolished afterwards.

== Demographics ==
Shenton Park's population at the 2016 Australian census was 4,525, of which almost all are east of the railway line. This population is an increase on the 4,350 recorded at the 2011 census, the 4,195 recorded at the 2006 census, and the 4,163 recorded at the 2001 census. 47.9% of residents were male and 52.1% were female. The median age was 39, above the state average of 36 and the national average of 38.

At the 2016 census, 67.4% of Daglish households were families, below the state average of 72.7%; 27.7% were single person households, above the state average of 23.6%; and 4.9% were group households, above the state average of 3.8%. Of those family households, 35.8% were couples without children, 49.3% were couples with children, 13.0% were a single parent with children, and 1.9% were some other type of family. These figures are all close to the state averages of 38.5%, 45.3%, 14.5% and 1.7% respectively. The average number of people per household was 2.5, slightly below the state average of 2.6.

Out of the suburbs 1,886 dwellings, 1,676 were occupied and 210 were unoccupied at the 2016 census. Out of the occupied dwellings, 67.4% were detached, below the state average of 79.1%; 14.7% were semi detached, close to the state average of 14.1%; and 17.9% were flats or apartments, above the state average of 5.7%, The average number of bedrooms per dwelling was 2.8, below the state average of 3.3. 35.1% of dwellings were owned outright, compared to the state average of 28.5%; 27.8% were owned with a mortgage, compared to the state average of 39.7%; 34.3% were rented, compared to the state average of 28.3%, and 2.7% had some other tenure type or the tenure type was not stated, compared to the state average of 3.7%.

At the 2016 census, the median weekly personal income was $998, compared to the state average of $724 and national average of $662; the median weekly family income was $2,936, compared to the state average of $1,910 and national average of $1,734; and the median weekly household income was $2,196, compared to the state average of $1,595 and the national average of $1,438. Professionals and managers were the most common professions for those employed living in Subiaco, at 47.8% and 14.7% of residents respectively. Clerical and administrative workers were 10.4% of those employed, community and personal service workers were 8.0%, and sales workers were 6.2%. Blue collar jobs were low, with technicians and trades workers at 5.7%, labourers at 4.6%, and machinery operators and drivers at 0.8%. The most common industries of employment were hospitals (except psychiatric hospitals) (9.5%), higher education (6.1%), legal services (3.4%), cafes and restaurants (2.6%), and state government administration (2.5%). 53.4% of residents aged 15 years or above had a bachelor's degree or above, significantly higher than the state average of 20.5%.

The most common ancestries that people identified with at the 2016 census were English (29.7%), Australian (22.1%), Irish (9.2%), Scottish (8.4%), and Chinese (3.9%). 62.3% of residents were born in Australia, slightly higher than the state average of 60.3%. The next most common birthplaces were England (9.6%), Scotland (1.8%), New Zealand (1.5%), the United States (1.5%), and Malaysia (1.4%). 39.7% of residents had both parents born outside Australia, and 38.0% of residents had both parents born inside Australia. The most common religious affiliations were no religion (41.3%), Catholic (17.4%), Anglican (15.4%), and Uniting Church (3.2%). 9.0% of residents did not state their religion.

== Parks and amenities ==
On the western side is Shenton College, a purpose-built high school established in 2000, a teaching and rehabilitation hospital which includes a health science campus of Curtin University of Technology, two private hospitals, the University of Western Australia Shenton Field Station, offices of numerous health advocacy associations and depots and processing plants associated with the Water Corporation and various councils.

The suburb is the base of Post Newspapers, in Onslow Road, a weekly newspaper that is distributed in Perth's western suburbs.

Shenton Park has two animal welfare organisations opposite each other on Lemnos Street: the Dogs' Refuge Home and the Cat Haven.

During an outbreak of smallpox in 1893, the colonial government set up an isolation tent hospital in the bush at Shenton Park. The facility was home to the Rehabilitation Services and Spinal Unit of Royal Perth Hospital. The hospital has since closed.

== Education ==
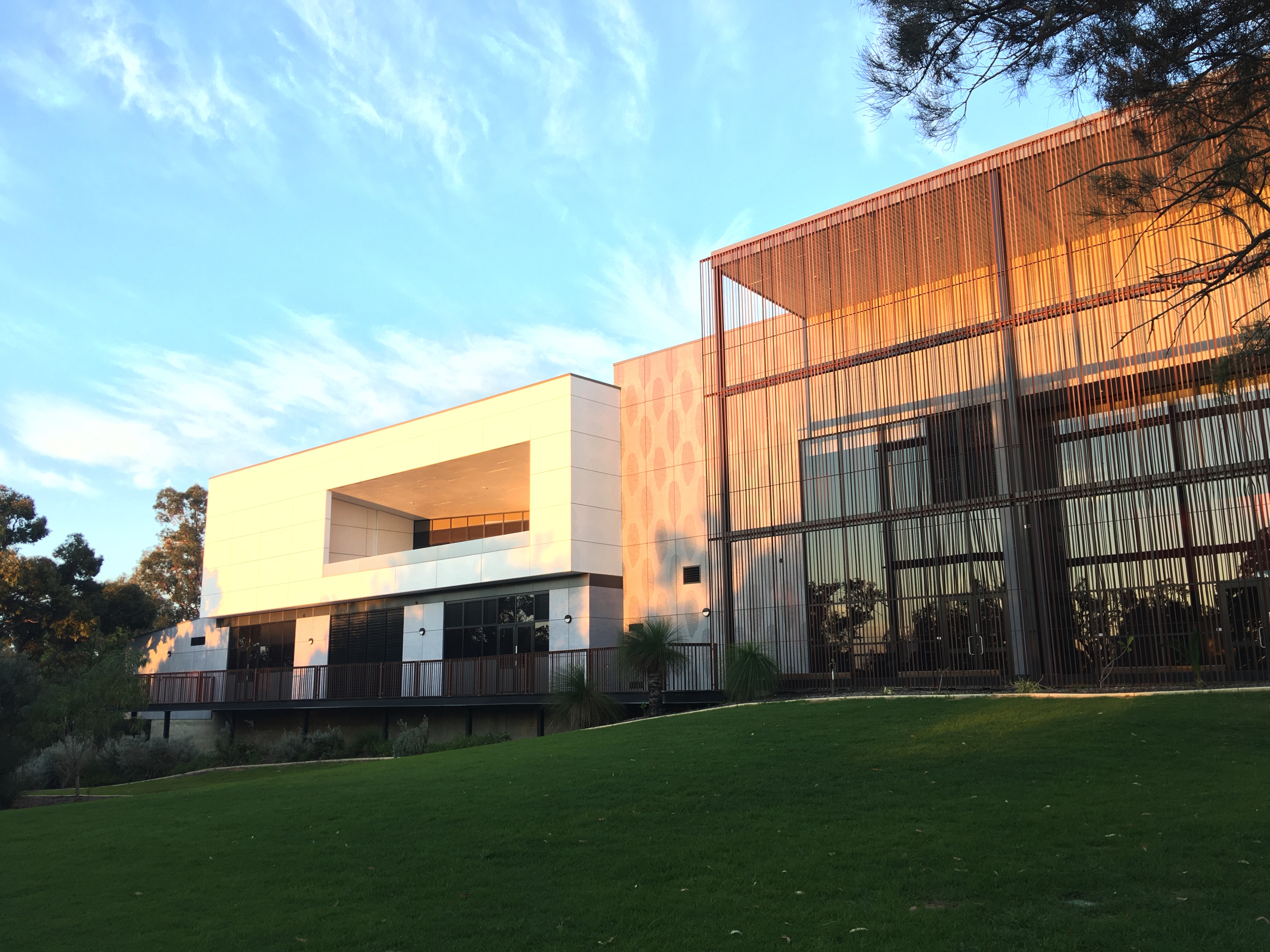
Shenton College's learning hub, completed c. 2019

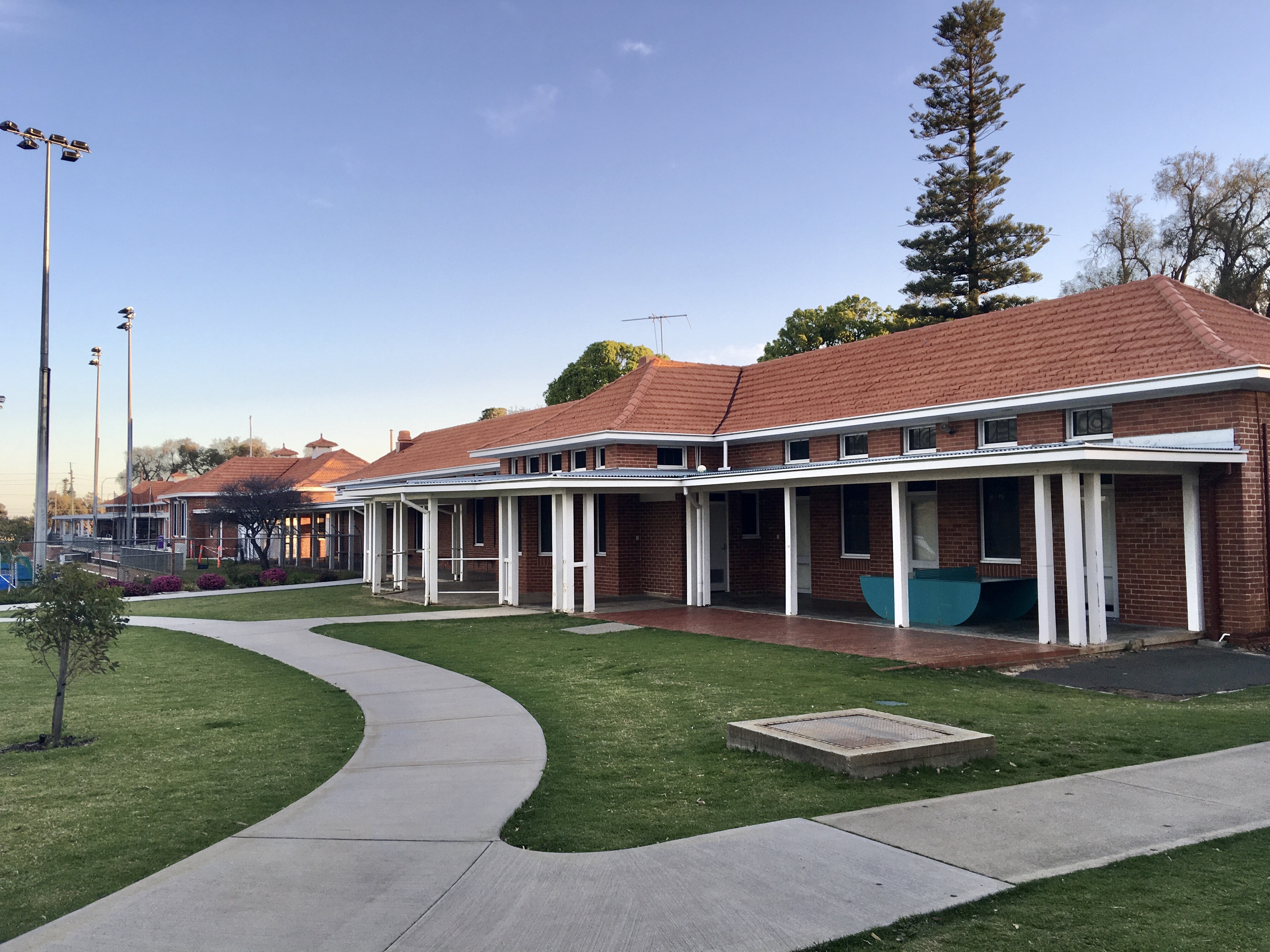
Shenton College's Borneo House, part of the heritage listed former Lemnos Hospital

Schools in Shenton Park are Shenton College and Rosalie Primary School. The now closed Hollywood Senior High School was located in Shenton Park.

== Governance ==
=== Local ===
East of the railway line, Shenton Park is part of the City of Subiaco. West of the railway line, Shenton Park is part of the City of Nedlands. Within the City of Subiaco, Shenton Park is part of the South Ward. Within the City of Nedlands, Shenton Park is part of the Hollywood Ward.

=== State and federal ===
As of the 2021 Western Australian state election, for the Western Australian Legislative Assembly (lower house), Shenton Park is part of the electoral district of Nedlands. This seat is part of the North Metropolitan Region of the Western Australian Legislative Council (upper house). The current member for Nedlands is Jonathan Huston of the Liberal Party, the main centre-right party in Australia, which has held the seat in every election except 2021.

Shenton Park is within the division of Curtin for the Australian House of Representatives. The member for Curtin is Kate Chaney, a community independent.

The only voting location in Shenton Park is the Shenton Park Community Centre. Federal elections before 2013 also used St Aloysius Catholic Church for voting as well.

2021 state election Source: WAEC
Labor	35.5%
Liberal	27.8%
Greens	21.6%
Independent	9.0%
NMV	1.8%

2017 state election Source: WAEC
Liberal	42.6%
Labor	33.9%
Greens	15.5%
Matheson for WA	2.4%
Christians	1.3%

2013 state election Source: WAEC
Liberal	40.3%
Greens	19.7%
Labor	18.4%
Independent	16.2%
Christians	1.9%

2008 state election Source: WAEC
Liberal	33.5%
Independent	24.2%
Labor	19.8%
Greens	16.7%
CDP	1.3%

2019 federal election Source: AEC
Liberal	42.3%
Greens	21.5%
Labor	20.9%
Independent	10.3%
Western Australia	1.9%

2016 federal election Source: AEC
Liberal	57.7%
Greens	21.3%
Labor	17.2%
Independent	2.4%
Liberty Alliance	1.3%

2013 federal election Source: AEC
Liberal	52.3%
Greens	23.9%
Labor	19.6%
Palmer United	2.4%
Christians	1.0%

2010 federal election Source: AEC
Liberal	48.6%
Greens	28.1%
Labor	21.1%
CDP	2.3%

== Transport ==
At the 2016 census, 52.1% of Shenton Park residents travelled to work in a car, compared to the state average of 70.4%; 15.7% travelled to work on public transport, compared to the state average of 9.2%; 7.3% walked to work, compared to the state average of 2.8%; and 6.2% cycled to work, compared to the state average of 1.0%.

=== Road ===
Major roads in Shenton Park include Aberdare Road, Hay Street, Nicholson Road, Railway Road, Rokeby Road, Selby Street, Stubbs Terrace, and Thomas Street. Thomas Street is a six-lane dual carriageway which travels along Shenton Park's western boundary. To the south, Thomas Street leads to Stirling Highway and the University of Western Australia (UWA). To the north-east, Thomas Street leads to the Perth CBD and the Mitchell Freeway. Hay Street is a four-lane dual carriageway which travels along Shenton Park's northernmost boundary. To the west it leads to West Coast Highway and to the east it leads to the Perth CBD.

Aberdare Road and Nicholson Road travel along the northern and southern boundaries of the eastern section of Shenton Park, linking Thomas Street with Railway Road. Nicholson Road passes under the railway at a bridge, connecting to Selby Street, which runs north–south. To the north, it leads to Innaloo and Stirling. To the south, Selby Street leads to Stubbs Terrace, which runs along the north side of the railway to Claremont. On the southern side of the railway is Railway Road, which also leads to Claremont south-west of Shenton Park. Rokeby Road is a road which goes north from Shenton Park, going into the Subiaco town centre.

=== Public transport ===
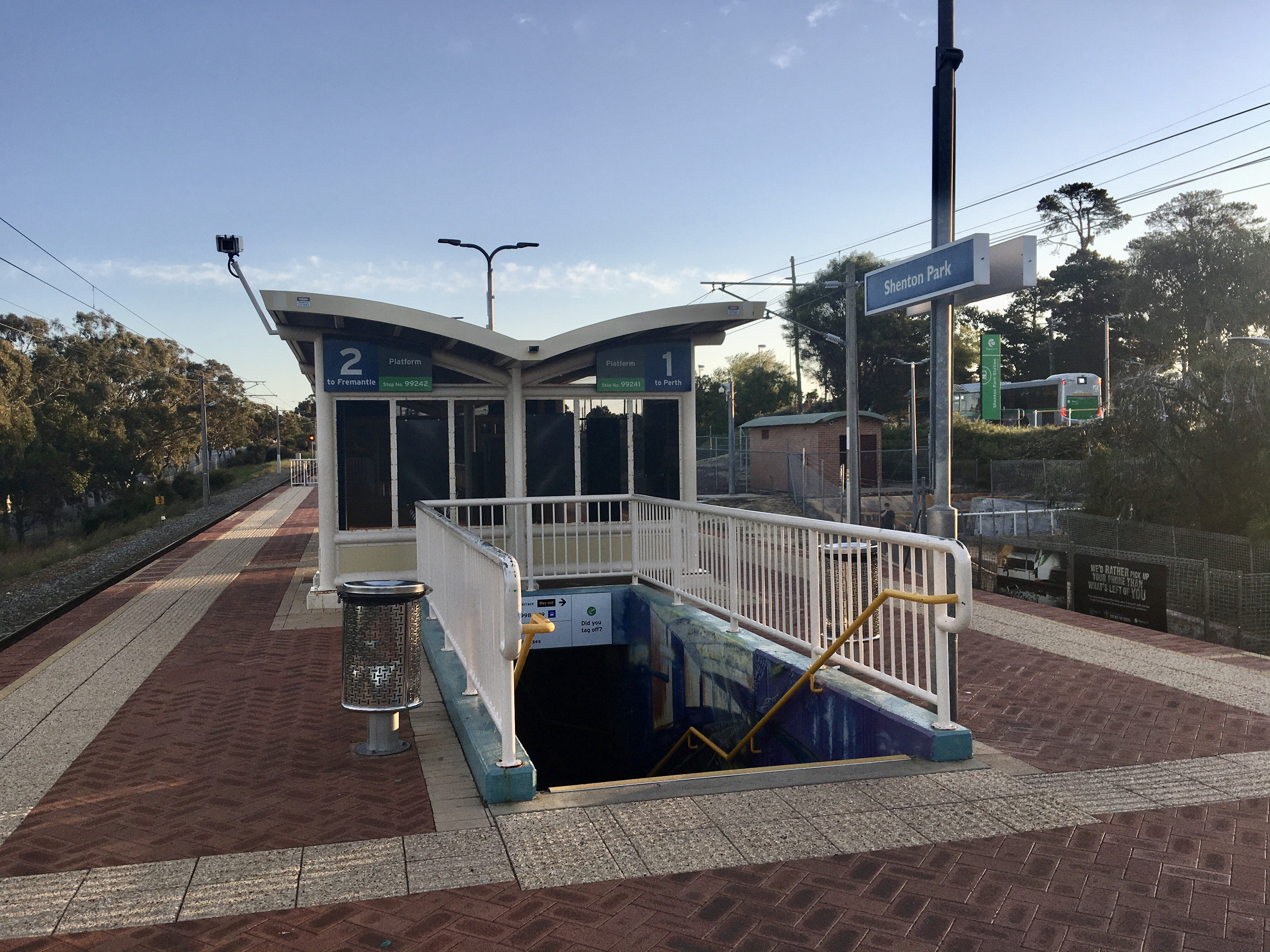
Shenton Park railway station in December 2021

Public transport in Perth is all under the Transperth brand. Train services are operated by Transperth Trains, a division of the Public Transport Authority. Bus services in Perth are contracted out to private companies. Subiaco is in the Claremont contract area, which is being operated by Swan Transit.

Shenton Park is served by Shenton Park railway station along the Fremantle and Airport lines, which provide connections to the port city of Fremantle, Perth CBD, Perth Airport and the eastern suburbs.. The bus routes which serve Shenton Park are route 24, 25, 26, 27, 28 (infrequently), 96, 97, 103, 998 and 999. Routes 998 and 999, also known as the CircleRoute, are a pair of bus routes which travel in a circle around Perth. Route 998 is clockwise, and route 999 is anticlockwise. Their route goes through Shenton Park along Aberdare Road, crossing the railway line at a bus only bridge south of Shenton Park station, before going along Stubbs Terrace and Selby Street. The destinations that the other routes link to include Claremont station along the Fremantle and Airport lines, UWA, Dalkeith and Nedlands to the south, the Perth CBD, East Perth and Leederville railway station along the Yanchep line.

A Transperth depot exited until replaced by a new facility in Mount Claremont in July 2019.
