= City of Nedlands =

Local government area in Perth, Western Australia

Coordinates: 31°58′55″S 115°48′25″E

- Local government area
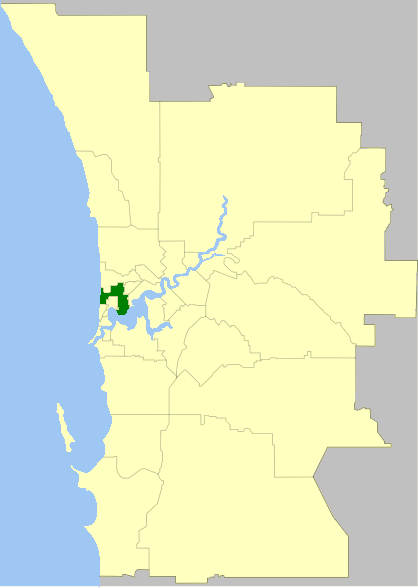
- The City of Nedlands within the Perth Metropolitan Area

- Interactive map of City of Nedlands
- Country: Australia
- State: Western Australia
- Region: West Metropolitan Perth
- Established: 1893
- Council seat: Nedlands

Government
  - Mayor: None
  - State electorate: Nedlands, Cottesloe
  - Federal division: Curtin

Area
  - Total: 20 km^{2} (7.7 sq mi)

Population
  - Total: 22,132 (LGA 2021)
- Website: City of Nedlands
LGAs around City of Nedlands
Cambridge	Cambridge	Cambridge
Indian Ocean	City of Nedlands	Subiaco
Cottesloe	Claremont	Perth

The City of Nedlands is a local government area in the inner western suburbs of the Western Australian capital city of Perth, about 7 kilometres (4 mi) west of Perth's central business district. The city is situated within the western suburbs of the metropolitan area—known colloquially as the “golden triangle” for the concentration of wealth and high housing values.

== History ==
The City of Nedlands originated in the Claremont Road District, which was established on 30 March 1893 after a petition from ratepayers who lived in the areas of Nedlands and Claremont, which had grown substantially in population at the end of the 19th century. Seven men were nominated to the new Board, which became the first local government authority for the Nedlands/Claremont area.

In 1898, Claremont itself split away to form a municipal government, which still exists today as the Town of Claremont.

It was renamed the Nedlands Road District on 12 August 1932 and given municipal status as the Municipality of Nedlands on 17 February 1956. It then assumed its current name when it was granted city status on 1 July 1959. The city was made up of four wards – Melvista, Hollywood, Dalkeith and Coastal. These wards continue to the present day.

Following an unsuccessful effort to amalgamate metropolitan local governments in 2016, the state government expanded the boundary of the City of Perth to incorporate a portion of the City of Nedlands that included the University of Western Australia and surrounding residential areas.

Following the change of government in the 2017 state election, the City of Nedlands experienced sustained political pressure to accommodate infill development and higher residential densities. The failure of Council to cooperate in replacing the city's 30-year old planning scheme led to the imposition of a new planning scheme by the Minister of Planning. A subsequent spate of development applications led to significant community unrest and opposition and contributed to the resignations of key executive staff (including the chief executive officer and director of planning) and the mayor.

In July 2025 the council was sacked by the Local Government Minister, following the resignation of four councillors. The city is run by three commissioners until the March 2026 elections: chair commissioner David Caddy and commissioners Bianca Sandri and Cath Hart.

== Wards ==
The town is divided into four wards, each electing three councillors. The mayor is directly elected.

- Coastal Ward
- Dalkeith Ward
- Hollywood Ward
- Melvista Ward

== Mayor ==
As of July 2025, the City of Nedlands has no mayor.

== Suburbs ==
The suburbs of the City of Nedlands with population and size figures based on the most recent Australian census:

Suburb	Population	Area	Map
Dalkeith	4,398 (SAL 2021)	2.9 km^{2} (1.1 sq mi)	
Floreat *	8,621 (SAL 2021)	5.3 km^{2} (2.0 sq mi)	
Karrakatta	22 (SAL 2021)	1.8 km^{2} (0.69 sq mi)	
Mount Claremont *	4,999 (SAL 2021)	4.3 km^{2} (1.7 sq mi)	
Nedlands	10,561 (SAL 2021)	5.4 km^{2} (2.1 sq mi)	
Shenton Park *	4,638 (SAL 2021)	3.3 km^{2} (1.3 sq mi)	
Swanbourne	4,592 (SAL 2021)	5.2 km^{2} (2.0 sq mi)	

* Shared with other council areas (Subiaco; Cambridge; Perth)

== Population ==
Historical population

Year	Pop.	±% p.a.
1911	1,230	—
1921	3,557	+11.20%
1933	10,580	+9.51%
1947	18,226	+3.96%
1954	22,814	+3.26%
1961	23,218	+0.25%
1966	23,320	+0.09%
1971	22,878	−0.38%
1976	20,974	−1.72%

Year	Pop.	±% p.a.
1981	20,257	−0.69%
1986	18,623	−1.67%
1991	20,210	+1.65%
1996	20,598	+0.38%
2001	21,047	+0.43%
2006	20,334	−0.69%
2011	20,534	+0.20%
2016	21,121	+0.57%
2021	22,132	+0.94%

== Heritage listed places ==
As of 2024, there are 22 places on the State Register of Heritage Places in the City of Nedlands, among them the Captain Stirling Hotel and Graylands Hospital.
