= Jualbup Lake =

Lake in Perth. Western Australia

Lake Jualbup
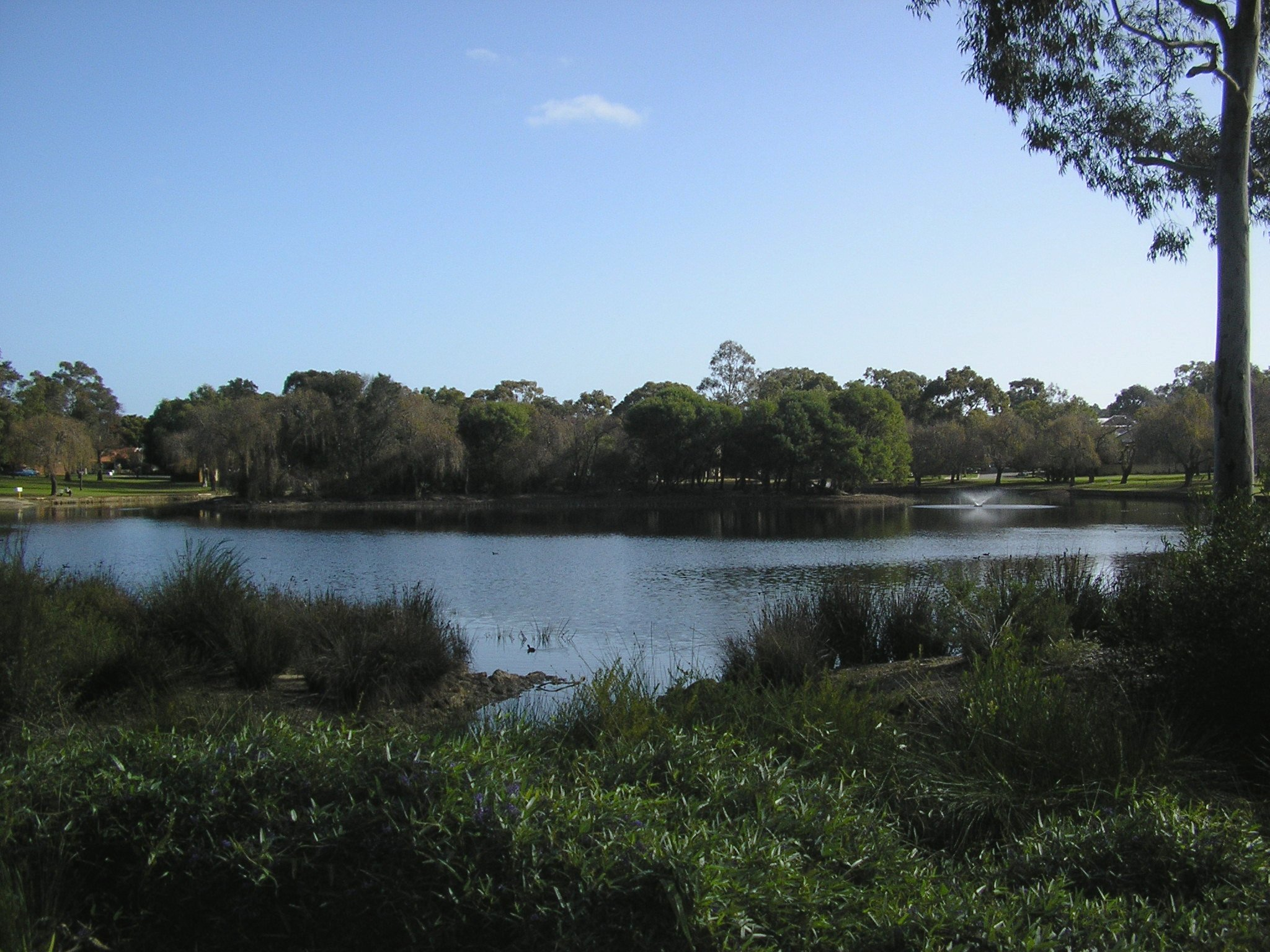
- In the foreground, the lake's edge has been planted with native plants to restore the original habitat.

- Location within Perth
- Interactive map of Lake Jualbup
- Location: Perth, Western Australia
- Coordinates: 31°57′32″S 115°48′43″E
- Type: Freshwater
- Basin countries: Australia

Lake Jualbup, formerly the Shenton Park Lake, is a freshwater lake located in Perth, Western Australia.

== Description ==
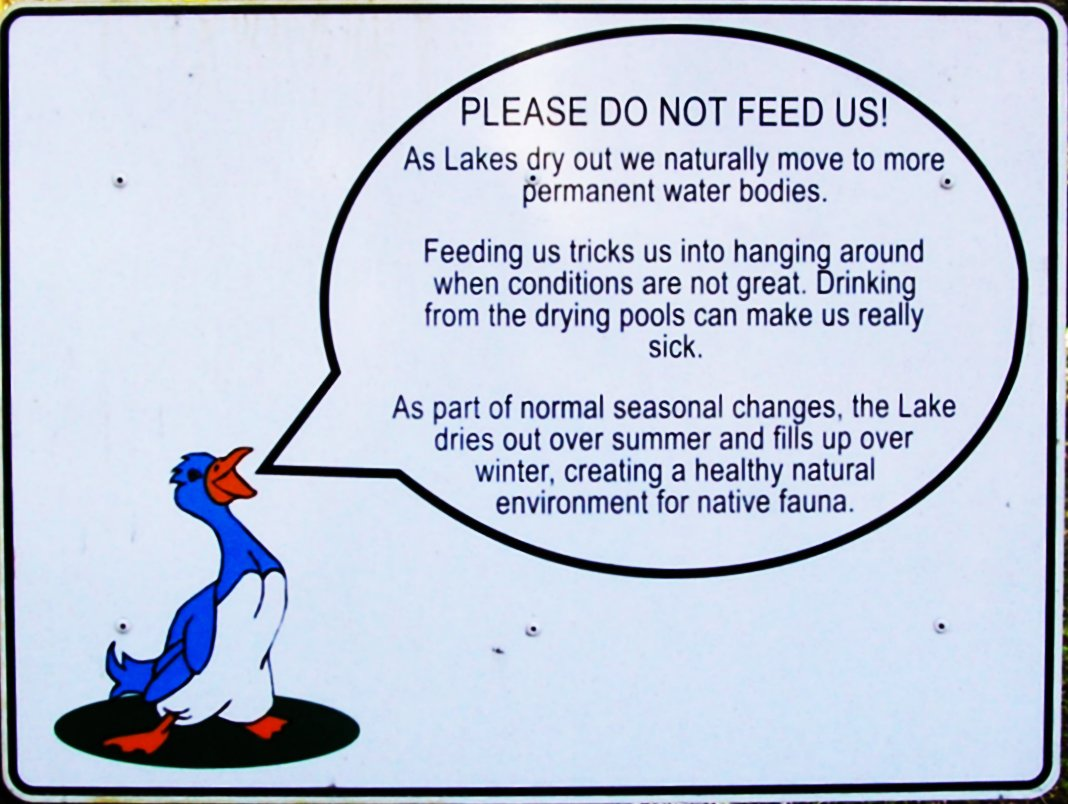
Several information signs surround the lake, instructing visitors not to feed the birds.

The lake is contained within Shenton Park, a parkland in the suburb of Shenton Park, bounded by Lake Avenue, Excelsior Street, Evans Street and Herbert Road. As well as the lake, the park area includes open grassed space, barbecues and playground equipment and a masonry building and public toilet in the south-west corner. The lake is generally full during the winter rainy season, but can dry up completely during the summer months. A variety of birdlife (including the black swan) can be found around the lake, as well as a number of aquatic creatures such as turtles.

The area surrounding Lake Jualbup was originally known as Jualbup, an Aboriginal term meaning 'a place where water rises in the season of spring'. In the early days of European settlement, a timber miller named James Dyson worked in the area, and thus it became known as Dyson's Swamp. In 1877, James Dyson sold his swamp to George Shenton's son. Later it was renamed Shenton Park Lake, after the land developer and politician, George Shenton. The Aboriginal name Jualbup was restored to the lake in 1996.

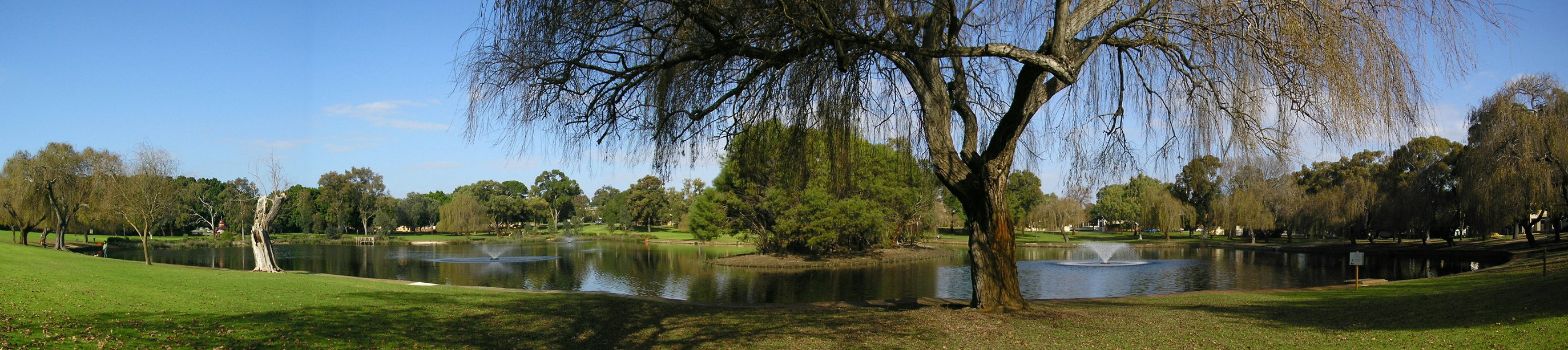

== See also ==
- List of lakes of Australia § Western Australia
