= West Leederville railway station =

Railway station in Perth, Western Australia

West Leederville
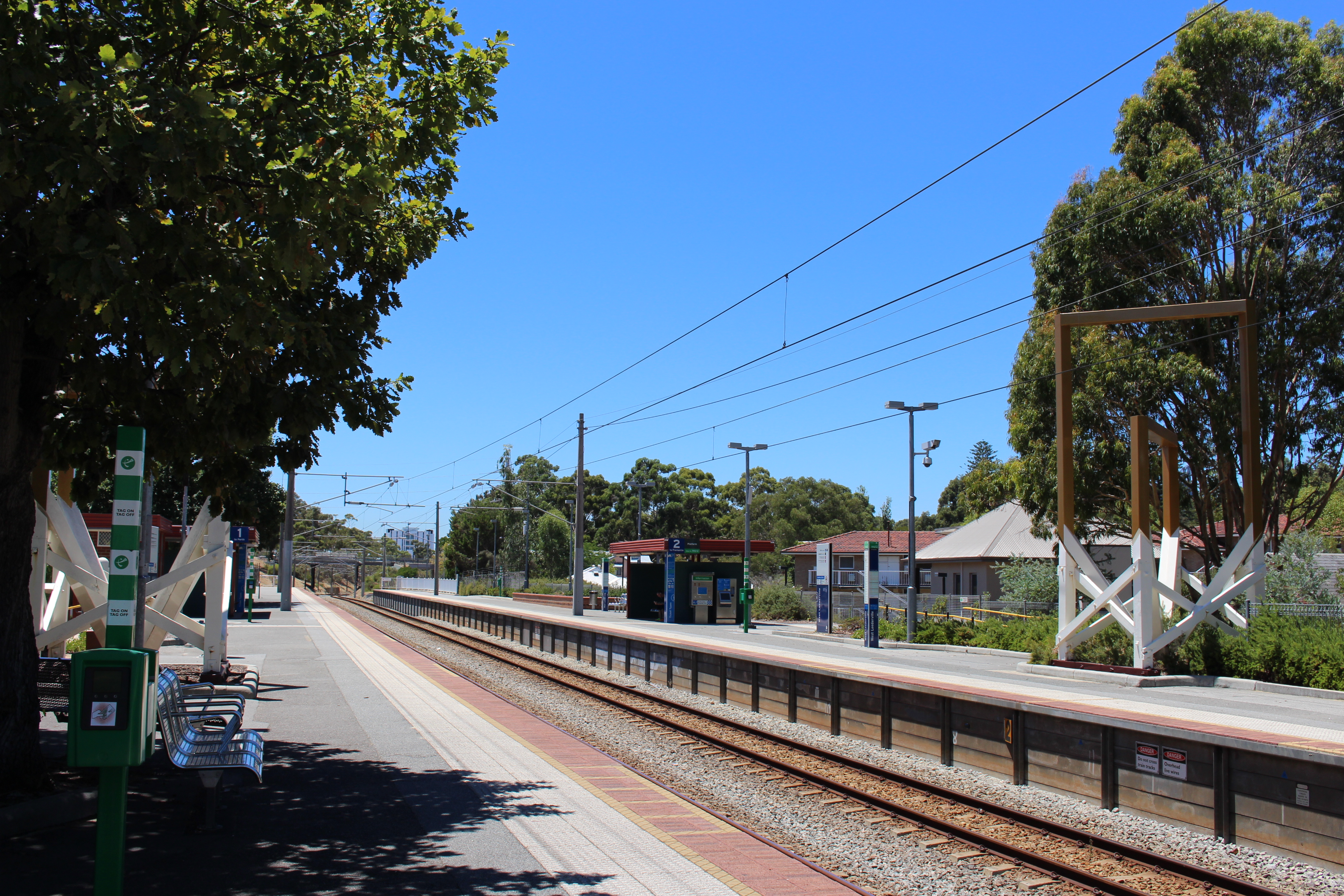
- Eastbound view from Platform 1, January 2015

General information
- Location: Railway Parade, West Leederville; Australia
- Coordinates: 31°56′34″S 115°49′59″E
- Owner: Public Transport Authority
- Operator: Transperth Train Operations
- Lines: Airport line Fremantle line
- Distance: 2.7 kilometres (1.7 mi) from Perth
- Platforms: 3 side
- Tracks: 3

Construction
- Structure type: Ground
- Accessible: Yes

Other information
- Fare zone: 1

History
- Opened: 12 July 1897
- Former names: Leederville

Passengers
- 2013–14: 223,313

Services
Preceding station	Transperth	Following station
City West towards Perth	Fremantle line All	Subiaco towards Fremantle
City West towards High Wycombe	Airport line All (W For Fremantle Line going to Claremont)	Subiaco towards Claremont
Location
- Location of West Leederville railway station

West Leederville railway station is on the Transperth network in Western Australia. It is located on the Fremantle line and Airport line, 2.7 kilometres from Perth station on the boundary between West Leederville and Subiaco. It was the main station for the former Subiaco Oval containing a special event platform no longer in use.

== History ==
A station at West Leederville was not part of the original Eastern Railway between Fremantle and Guildford when it opened on 1 March 1881.

A realigned track through the new Leederville Cutting between West Leederville and West Perth station was opened for traffic on 9 June 1897, and on 12 July the station was opened as Leederville.

The station was renamed West Leederville on 1 February 1913 to reflect the name of the local area. The station closed on 1 September 1979 along with the rest of the Fremantle line, re-opening on 29 July 1983 when services were restored. In 2005, the platforms were extended to accommodate six carriage trains used on match days at Subiaco Oval. In 2007, a third platform was added on a stabling siding to the west of the existing platforms. When Subiaco Oval closed in 2017 Platform 3 was abandoned as there was no longer a need to use it. It is still occasionally used as a siding to stable a train.

== Services ==
West Leederville station is linked by Transperth Fremantle line services from Fremantle to Perth that continue through to Midland via the Midland line, and Airport line services from Claremont to High Wycombe.

Since 10 October 2022, the station has also received Airport line services.

During events at Subiaco Oval, West Leederville was also linked with Mandurah line services.

West Leederville station saw 223,313 passengers in the 2013–14 financial year.

== Platforms ==
West Leederville platform arrangement
Stop ID	Platform	Line	Destination	Via	Stopping Pattern	Notes
99211	1	Fremantle line	Perth		All stations	
99211	1	Airport line	High Wycombe	Perth	W	
99212	2	Fremantle line	Fremantle		All stations	
99212	2	Airport line	Claremont		W	
99213	3	Platform not in use				
