= List of mayors of Subiaco =

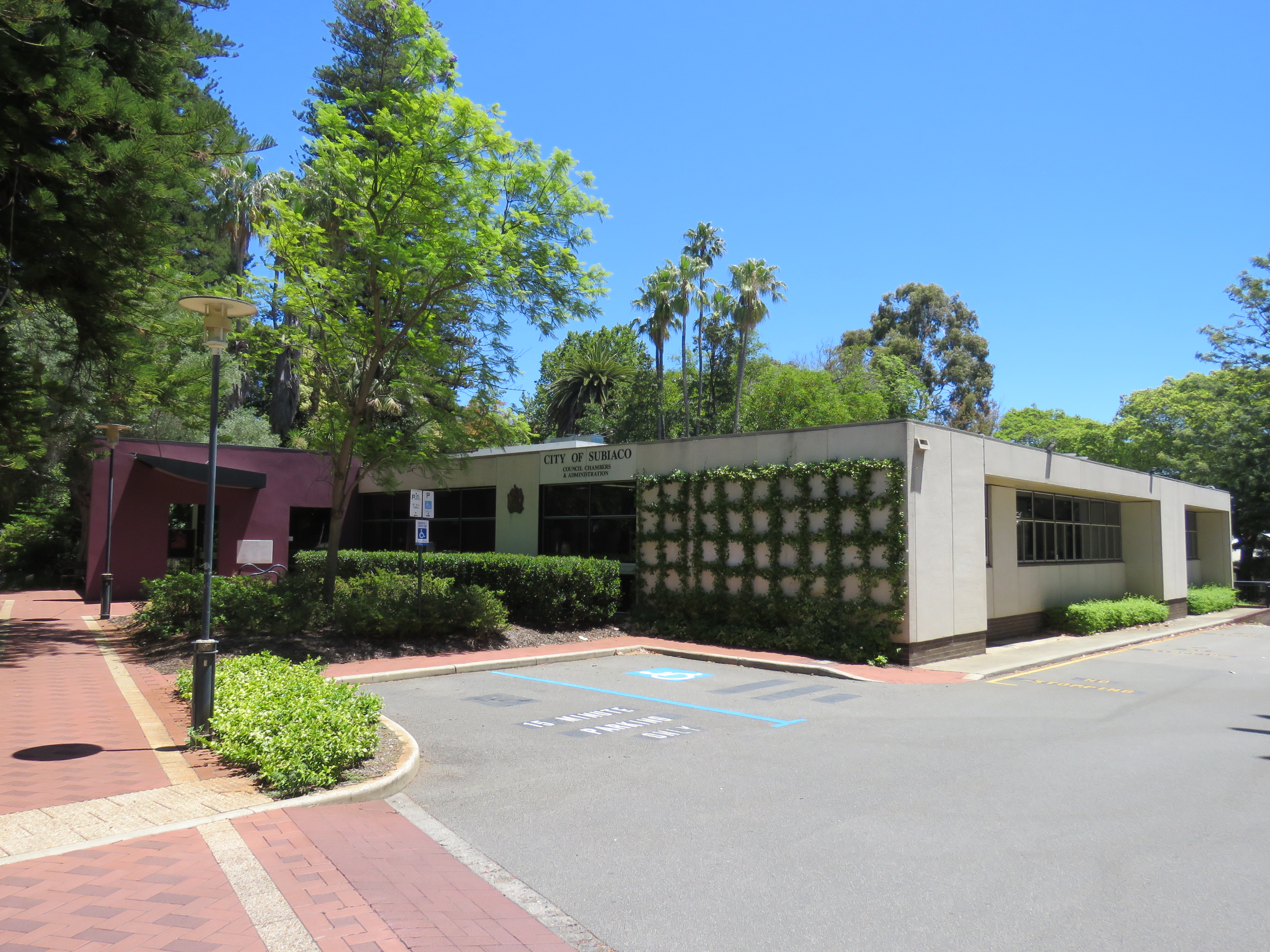
Subiaco council chambers

The City of Subiaco is a local government area in Perth, Western Australia. It was established on 10 April 1896 as the Subiaco Road Board, with a chairman elected by the board members as its leader. The first chairman was Charles Hutt, who was the secretary of the Subiaco Progress Association. By the end of 1896, the population of the Subiaco Road District was above 2000, allowing the Road Board to apply to become a municipality. The government granted the request, and so the Municipality of Subiaco was gazetted on 26 March 1897. The first mayor of the Municipality of Subiaco was Henry Doyle. By 1952, the Municipality of Subiaco had reached a high enough population that it was eligible to become a city. Thus, on 8 February 1952, the City of Subiaco was gazetted.

The longest serving mayor is Joseph Abrahams, who served from 1949 to 1974.

Evelyn Parker, who was mayor from 1975 to 1977, was Western Australia's first woman mayor. She was honoured with the naming of the Evelyn H Parker Library in 1990.

== Subiaco Road Board ==
Chairman	Term	Notes	Ref
Charles Hart	1896–1897	Secretary of the Subiaco Progress Association	

== Municipality of Subiaco ==
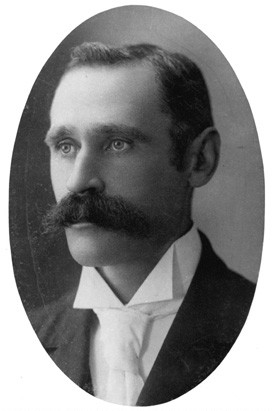
Henry Daglish was the Mayor of Subiaco, Premier of Western Australia, and the member for Subiaco

Mayor	Term	Notes	Ref
Henry Doyle	1897–1898	Chair of the Subiaco Board of Health	
Charles Hart	1898–1899		
Austin Bastow	1899–1902		
Henry Daglish	1902–1904	Member for Subiaco from 24 April 1901 to 3 October 1911; Premier of Western Australia from 10 August 1904 to 25 August 1905; Honoured with the naming of the suburb of Daglish	
John Henry Prowse	1904–1905	Later served as the member for Swan and Forrest in the Parliament of Australia	
Austin Bastow	1905–1907		
Henry Daglish	1907–1908	Member for Subiaco from 24 April 1901 to 3 October 1911; Honoured with the naming of the suburb of Daglish	
Thomas Harold "Shirley" White	1908–1910		
James Chesters	1910–1912		
Joseph Duffell	1912–1915	Member for the Metropolitan-Suburban Province from 22 May 1914 to 21 May 1926	
James Theophilus Guy	1915–1916		
William John Berryman	1916–1917		
Lionel Boas	1917–1920		
William John Berryman	1920–1921		
Walter Richardson	1921–1922	Member for Subiaco from 12 March 1921 to 8 April 1933	
Arthur Keene	1922–1923		
Roland Astill Robinson	1923–1926		
John Charles Roydhouse	1926–1929		
G. H. Olney	1929–1931		
H. L. Downe	1931–1936		
Walter Richardson	1936–1943	Member for Subiaco from 12 March 1921 to 8 April 1933	
J. P. Bathgate	1943–1949		
Joseph H. Abrahams	1949–1952		

== City of Subiaco ==
Mayor	Term	Notes	Ref
Joseph H. Abrahams	1952–1974	Longest serving mayor of Subiaco, at 25 years	
Evelyn Helena Parker	1974–1977	First woman mayor in Western Australia; second in Australia; Honoured with the naming of the Evelyn H Parker Library in 1990	
Alf Fernihough	1977–1978		
Richard Diggins	1978–1989		
Helen Passmore	1989–1994		
Tony Costa	1994–2005		
Heather Henderson	2005–2017	Chose not to contest 2017 election	
Penny Taylor	2017–2021	Chose not to contest 2021 election	
David McMullen	2021–present	Re-elected unopposed at the 2025 election	

== Bibliography ==
- Spillman, Ken (1985). Identity Prized : A History of Subiaco. University of Western Australia Press. ISBN 0-85564-239-4.
- Spillman, Ken (2006). Tales of a singular city : Subiaco since the 1970s. City of Subiaco. ISBN 0-9590016-6-2.
- Bizzaca, Kristy (February 2014). "City of Subiaco Thematic History and Framework" (PDF). City of Subiaco. Archived from the original (PDF) on 19 March 2020.
