= Subiaco railway station =

Railway station in Perth, Western Australia

Subiaco
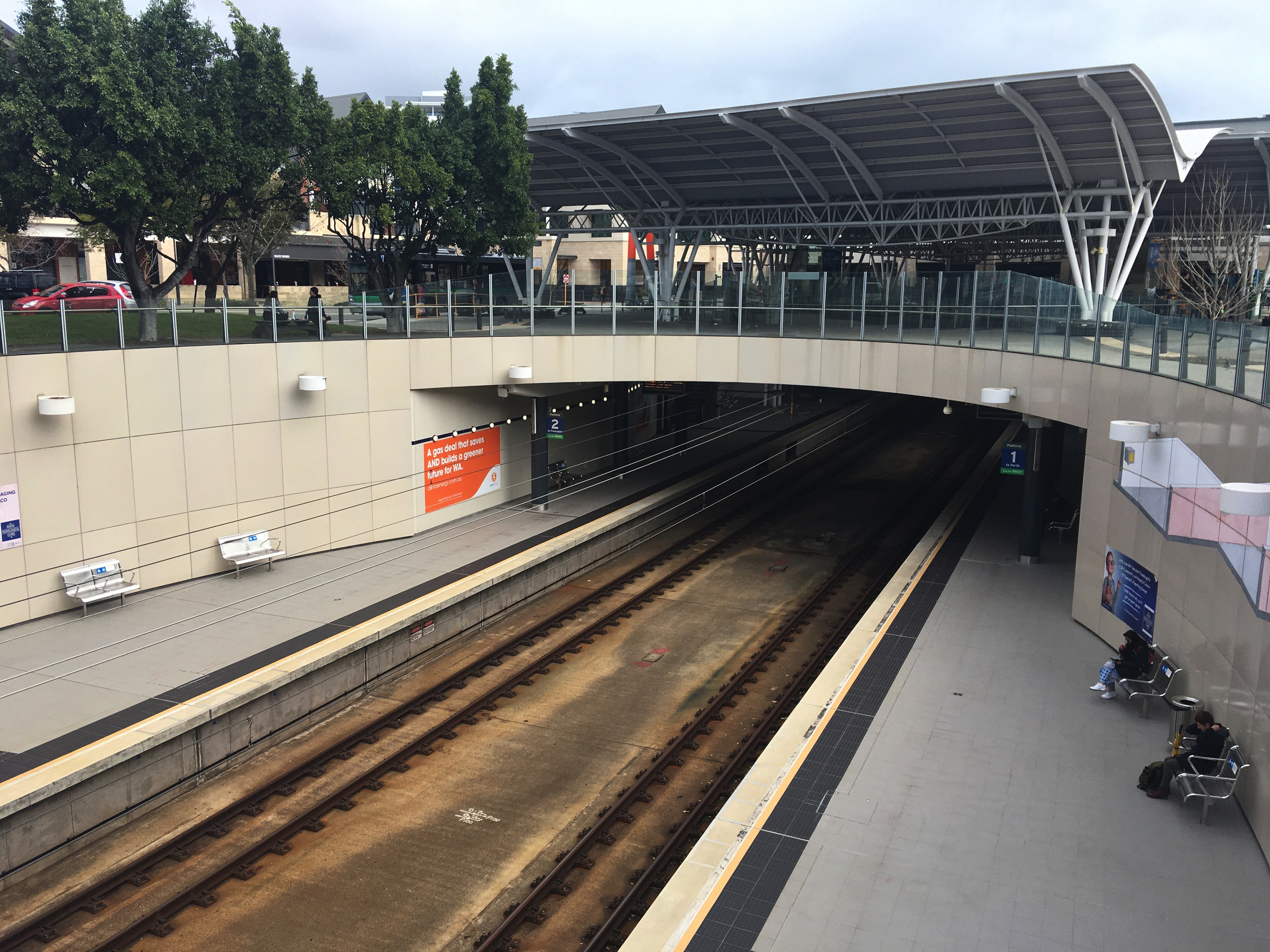
- Looking down to the platforms, August 2021

General information
- Location: Subiaco Square Road, Subiaco; Western Australia; Australia
- Coordinates: 31°56′41″S 115°49′26″E
- Owner: Public Transport Authority
- Operator: Public Transport Authority
- Lines: Airport line Fremantle line
- Distance: 3.7 kilometres (2.3 mi) from Perth
- Platforms: 2 side platforms
- Tracks: 2

Construction
- Structure type: Underground
- Accessible: Yes

Other information
- Fare zone: 1

History
- Opened: 1883
- Rebuilt: 9 December 1998

Passengers
- 2013–14: 975,390

Services
Preceding station	Transperth	Following station
West Leederville towards High Wycombe	Airport line	Daglish towards Claremont
West Leederville towards Perth	Fremantle line	Daglish towards Fremantle
Location
- Location of Subiaco station

Subiaco railway station is a railway station on the Transperth network in Western Australia. It is located on the Fremantle line and Airport line, 3.7 kilometres (2.3 mi) from Perth station serving the suburbs of Subiaco and Wembley.

== History ==
=== Original station and yard ===
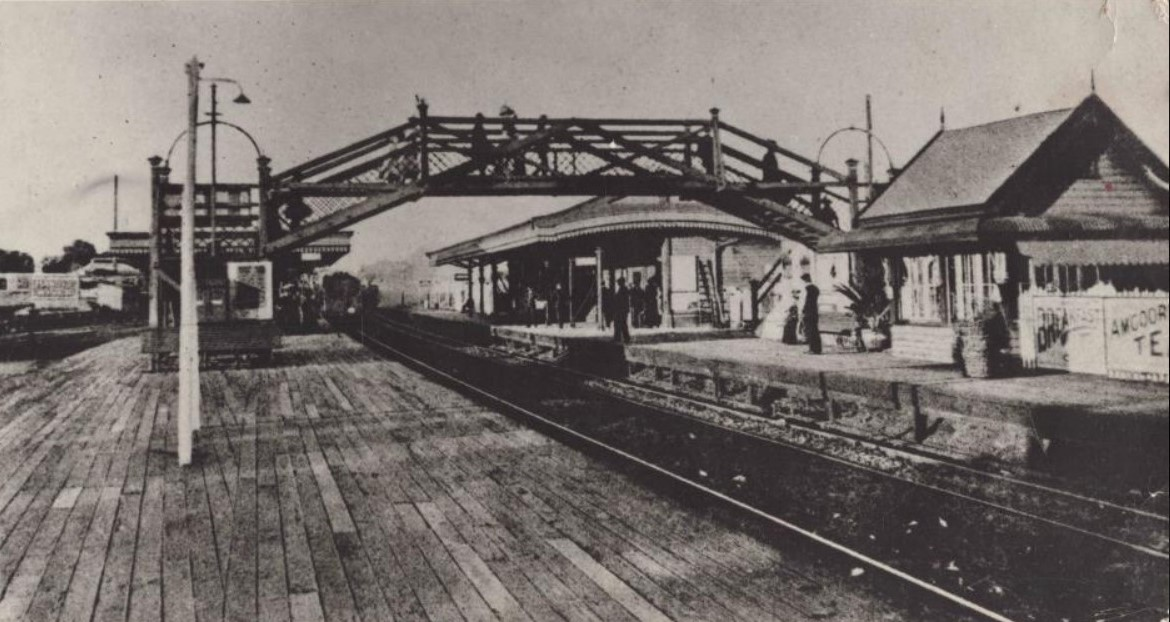
The second Subiaco station, photographed in 1905

Subiaco station opened in 1883. The station closed on 1 September 1979 along with the rest of the Fremantle line, re-opening on 29 July 1983 when services were restored. Up until the 1980s there was a freight receiving depot at this station, and a third platform.

Signal Cabin was opened in 1923, closed in 1990 and preserved at Bennett Brook Railway in 1999.

From 1 May 1895 to 30 June 1982, Subiaco station was staffed by a station master.

=== Sinking of railway ===
External images
- Subiaco station, December 1982 via Rail Heritage WA
- Subiaco tunnel under construction, 1998 via Rail Heritage WA
- An under-construction Subiaco station next to the surface-level tracks, 1998 via Rail Heritage WA

As part of the Subi Centro project, 900 metres (980 yd) of rail line was replaced by a tunnel and the station was rebuilt underground. Nine companies expressed interest in the construction contract. In July 1996, Multiplex, John Holland, Thiess Contractors, and a joint venture between Transfield Holdings and Barclay Mowlem were invited to tender for the contract, which closed in February 1997. Multiplex was named the preferred tenderer in May 1997 and awarded the $34.4 million contract the following month. Construction began immediately; tunnelling was scheduled to begin mid-July 1997.

On 27 February 1998, a 10-by-1.2-metre (32.8 ft × 3.9 ft) concrete roof slab for the tunnel, which weighed 5 tonnes (5.5 tons), fell down. No one was hurt as the workers nearby were on a lunch break. From the evening of 4 December to the early morning of 9 December 1998, the Fremantle line was closed so that the line could be diverted through the tunnel. The new station opened at the end of that shutdown, but it was officially opened on 12 December 1998 by Premier of Western Australia Richard Court.

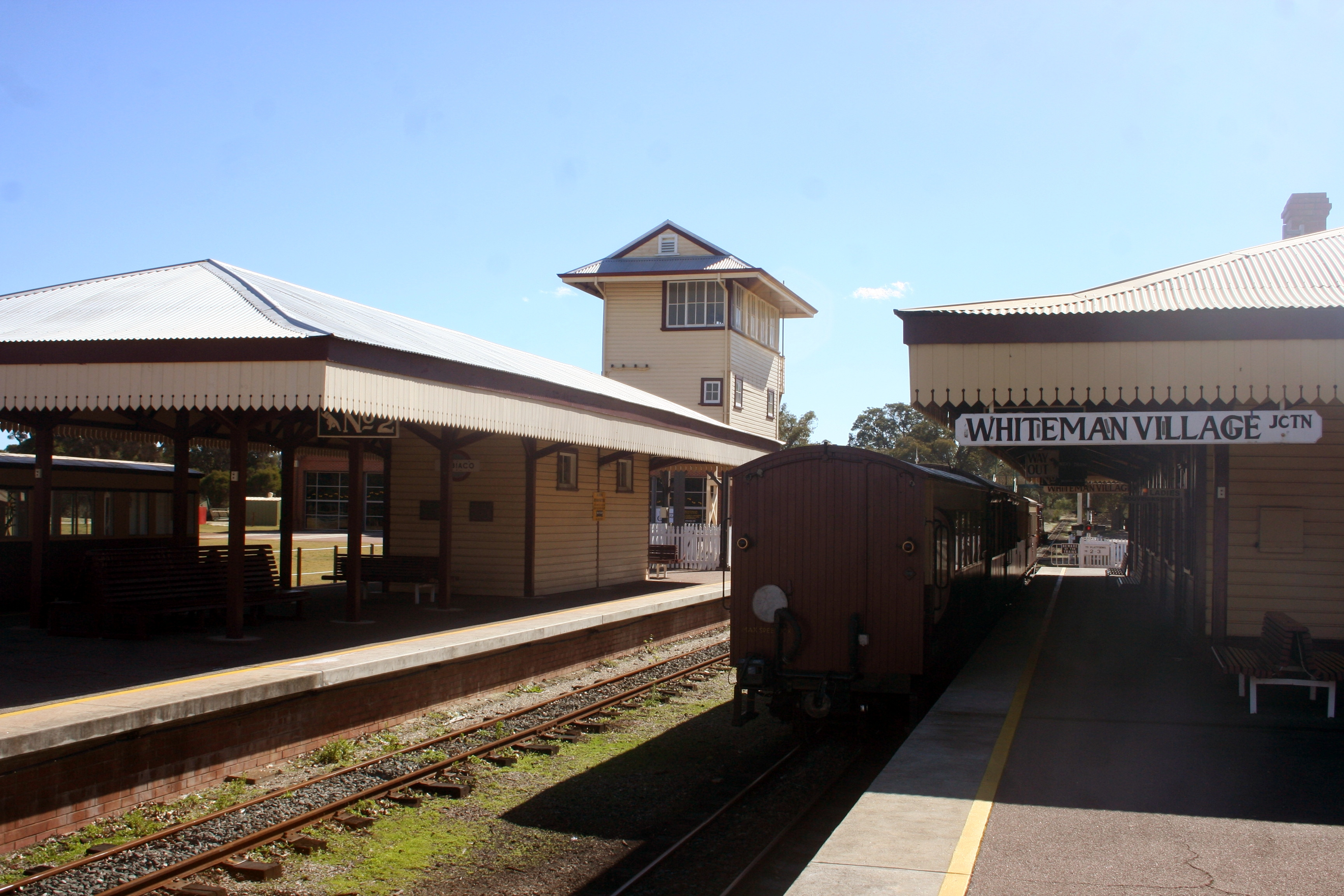
Whiteman Village Junction station on the Bennett Brook Railway in Whiteman Park. The platform shelter and signal box on the left are from the previous Subiaco station, demolished in 1998.

The station shelter and elevated signal cabin from the old station were restored and relocated to the Bennett Brook Railway in Whiteman Park in 2000, with the signal cabin being used as a control centre for the Bennett Brook Railway.

Until the opening of Perth Underground station in October 2007, Subiaco station was the only underground railway station in Perth.

From 2034, Subiaco station's platforms are planned to be extended to the east to accommodate six-car trains.

== Services ==
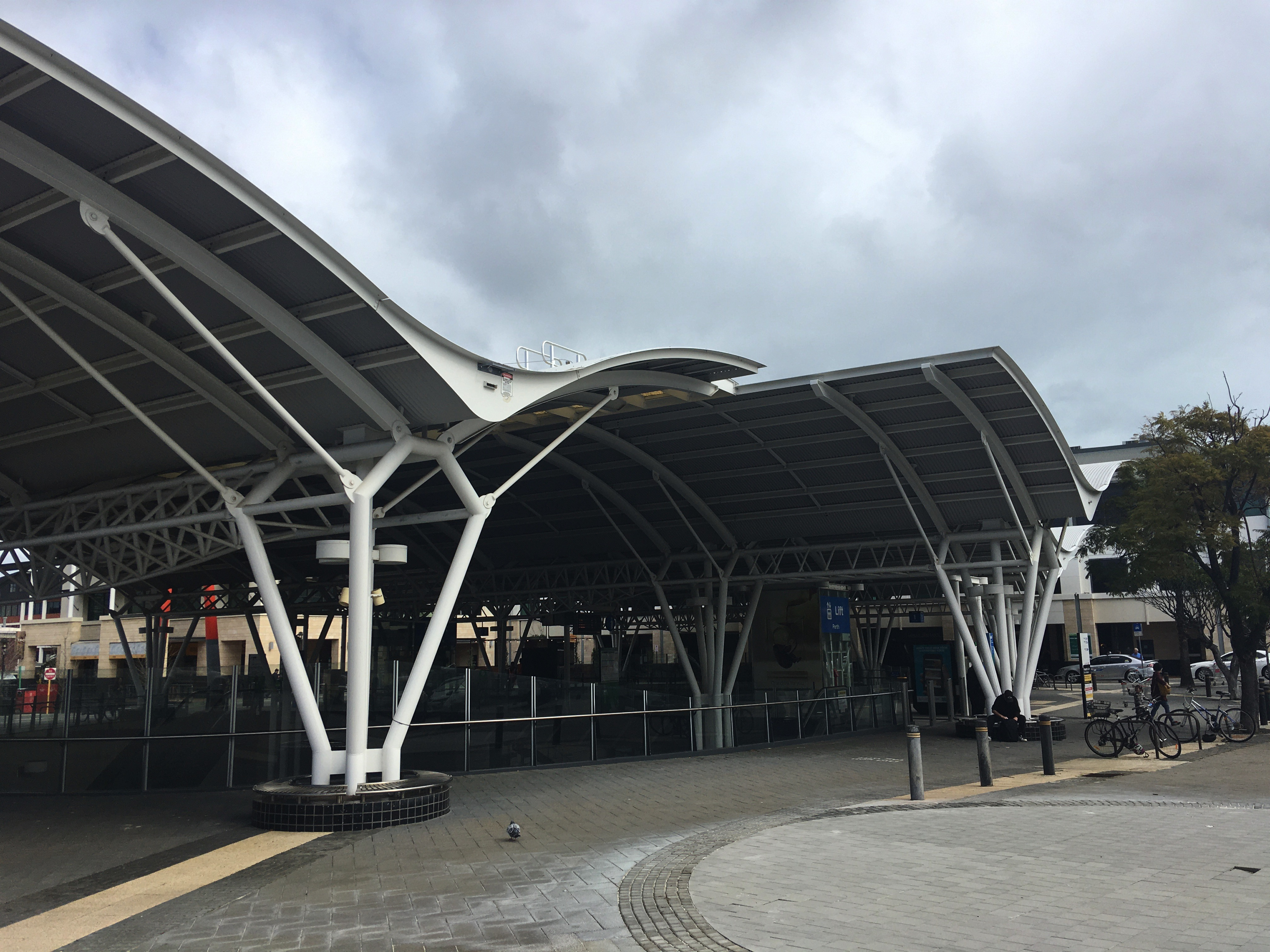
Subiaco station entrance

Subiaco station is served by Transperth Fremantle line services from Fremantle to Perth that continue through to Midland via the Midland line.

Since 10 October 2022, the station has received Airport line services.

Subiaco station saw 975,390 passengers in the 2013–14 financial year.

== Platforms ==
Subiaco platform arrangement
Stop ID	Platform	Line	Destination	Via	Stopping Pattern	Notes
99221	1	Fremantle line	Perth		All stations	
99221	1	Airport line	High Wycombe	Perth	W	
99222	2	Fremantle line	Fremantle		All stations	
99222	2	Airport line	Claremont		W	

== Bus routes ==
Stop	Route	Destination / description	Notes
Subiaco Square Road	95	to Bob Hawke College	
Subiaco Square Road	95	to Glendalough Station via Bob Hawke College and Harborne Street	
Subiaco Square Road	97	to University of Western Australia	
Roberts Road	28	to East Perth via Wellington Street	
Roberts Road	906	Rail replacement service to Perth station	
Hay Street	28	to Claremont station via Mount Claremont	
Station Street	906	Rail replacement service to Fremantle station	
