= City of Subiaco =

Coordinates: 31°56′56″S 115°49′37″E

- Local government area
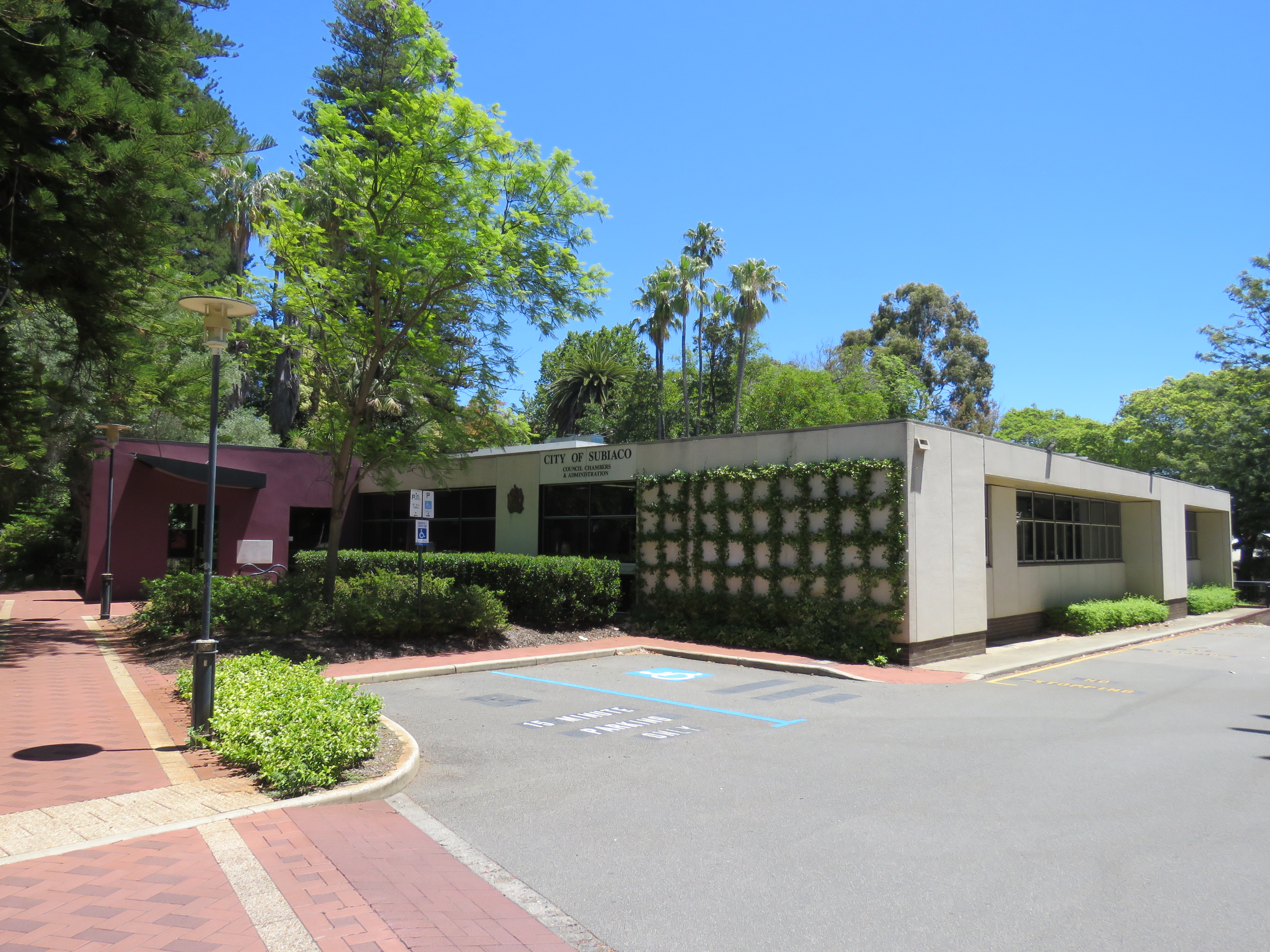
- The Subiaco council chambers in December 2021

- Interactive map of City of Subiaco
- Country: Australia
- State: Western Australia
- Region: West Metropolitan Perth
- Established: 1896
- Council seat: Subiaco

Government
  - Mayor: David McMullen
  - State electorate: Nedlands
  - Federal division: Curtin

Area
  - Total: 5.6 km^{2} (2.2 sq mi)

Population
  - Total: 17,267 (LGA 2021)
  - Density: 2,340/km^{2} (6,100/sq mi)
- Website: City of Subiaco
LGAs around City of Subiaco
Cambridge	Cambridge	Vincent
Nedlands	City of Subiaco	Perth
Nedlands	Kings Park	Kings Park

The City of Subiaco is a local government area in Western Australia. It covers an area of approximately 7 km² in inner western metropolitan Perth and lies about 3 km west of the Perth CBD. The City includes the historically working-class suburb of Subiaco centred around Rokeby Road. Since the 1990s the area has been extensively redeveloped and gentrified.

== History ==
A group of Benedictine monks settled in Subiaco in 1851. They called their monastery New Subiaco after the birthplace of the Benedictine Order – Subiaco, Italy. In 1881, the name Subiaco was adopted for a railway station near the monastery, and later for the cluster of houses and businesses that became the present Subiaco.

The Subiaco Progress Association was established in 1896. They lobbied for the formation of the Subiaco Road District, which was then created on 10 April 1896. The first chairman of the Subiaco Road Board was Charles Hart, who was Secretary of the Subiaco Progress Association. By the end of 1896, the population of the Subiaco Road District was above 2000, allowing the Road Board to apply to become a municipality. The government granted the request, and so the Municipality of Subiaco was gazetted on 26 March 1897.

In 1899, a permanent building for the Municipal council was constructed, on a site next to the primary school. The block this building was on later became known as Civic Square, due to the congregation of civic services such as a post office and fire station. In 1909, the council moved to a newer and larger building, still in Civic Square.

Around 1905, the Municipality was given 98 acres (40 ha) of endowment land to use, located north of the railway line and south of Salvado Road. The council held a competition for the design of a subdivision on the land. Architect George Temple Poole won the competition. The land then became an industrial area. The land was first leased in 1905, and factories were subsequently built on the land, including a timber and construction materials factory, and a foundry and ironworks.

By 1906, 4500 street trees had been planted by the municipality, establishing Subiaco as one of Perth's leafiest suburbs. This was initiated by the inaugural Town Clerk and Engineer Alexander Rankin. Ken Spillman wrote in his book that Rankin has a "near-obsession with beautifying the municipality".

Following World War I, the council and its residents entered into financial hardship. In November 1922, the council began construction on a World War I memorial clock tower. Despite initially being conceived as mostly community funded, the Subiaco council funded the majority of the memorial, after fundraising efforts did poorly. This made the financial situation at the council even worse. It was officially opened on 25 November 1923.

In 1927, the Subiaco post office relocated from Civic Square to a larger building on the corner of Rokeby Road and Park Street. This led to the council establishing a library in the old post office.

A referendum was held in 1935 on whether the Municipality of Subiaco should be amalgamated into the City of Perth, in line with the Greater Perth Movement which had seen similar amalgamations of the Leederville, North Perth and Victoria Park municipalities. The proposal was defeated with 73 percent voting against a merger.

By the late 1940s, the Municipality of Subiaco had reached a high enough population that it was eligible to become a city. Under the Municipal Corporations Act 1906, a municipality can become a city if its population is greater than 20,000, and its annual revenue is greater than £20,000. The municipality's population in 1952 was 20,100. Thus, on 8 February 1952, the City of Subiaco was gazetted. In celebration of becoming a city, a parade was staged along Hay Street and Rokeby Road on 20 September 1952. It started at Kitchener Park and ended at the corner of Rokeby and Heytesbury roads. Thousands of people from Subiaco and across Perth attended; Mayor Joseph Abrahams said that it was "the greatest assembly of citizens Subiaco has seen".

A new council building opened in 1968. The original, 1899 council building was demolished.

On 1 September 1968, the Subiaco Library was made free to use. It was paid for by the council. The following year, the library joined the State Library of Western Australia's public library system.

In 1975, the City of Subiaco had the first elected woman mayor in Western Australia, when Evelyn Helena Parker was elected mayor. She is also the second woman mayor in Australia, after Ella Stack, who was elected Lord Mayor of Darwin in the same year. She was honoured with the naming of the Evelyn H Parker Library in 1990.

== Wards ==
The town is divided into 4 wards, each with three councillors. The mayor is directly elected.

- North Ward
- South Ward
- Central Ward
- East Ward

== Mayor ==
David McMullen is Mayor of the City of Subiaco. First elected Mayor in October 2021, at the 2025 local government elections Mayor McMullen was re-elected for another Mayoral term, unopposed.

== Suburbs ==
The suburbs of the City of Subiaco with population and size figures based on the most recent Australian census:

Suburb	Population	Area	Map
Daglish	1,551 (SAL 2021)	0.7 km^{2} (0.27 sq mi)	
Jolimont	1,479 (SAL 2021)	0.7 km^{2} (0.27 sq mi)	
Shenton Park *	4,638 (SAL 2021)	3.3 km^{2} (1.3 sq mi)	
Subiaco	9,940 (SAL 2021)	3.1 km^{2} (1.2 sq mi)	

* These localities are only partially contained within the LGA boundary.

== Population ==
Historical population

Year	Pop.	±% p.a.
1903	4,702	—
1911	8,926	+8.34%
1921	13,647	+4.34%
1933	16,809	+1.75%
1947	18,789	+0.80%
1954	17,642	−0.90%
1961	16,033	−1.36%
1966	16,621	+0.72%
1971	17,119	+0.59%
1976	15,271	−2.26%

Year	Pop.	±% p.a.
1981	14,139	−1.53%
1986	14,826	+0.95%
1991	14,971	+0.19%
1996	14,804	−0.22%
2001	15,189	+0.51%
2006	16,380	+1.52%
2011	17,574	+1.42%
2016	19,359	+1.95%
2021	17,267	−2.26%

- The City of Subiaco was reduced in size from 7 to 5.6 square kilometers from the 2016 to the 2021 census

== Heritage-listed places ==
As of 2024, 928 places are heritage-listed in the City of Subiaco, of which 30 are on the State Register of Heritage Places, among them the Subiaco Hotel, King Edward Memorial Hospital for Women and the Regal Theatre.

In 2026, a project to preserve the Park Street Heritage Area received a "commendation" award from the Planning Institute of Australia. Titled Park Street Heritage Area: Achieving Heritage Outcomes Through Community Engagement and Empowerment, the project heritage listed 109 properties with 3 objections. The planning team won the Improving Planning Processes Award for the heritage area at the Planning Institute of Australia Awards in November 2025.

== Sister cities ==
- Subiaco, Arkansas (United States)
- Subiaco, Italy

== See also ==
- AmpFest, a Youth and music festival overseen by the City of Subiaco
