= List of State Register of Heritage Places in the City of Subiaco =

The State Register of Heritage Places is maintained by the Heritage Council of Western Australia. As of 2026, 1,015 places are heritage-listed in the City of Subiaco, of which 34 (Note: This search yields 33 results of which three are for the City of Perth, the Nedlands Park Masonic Hall, the Hackett Memorial Buildings and Shenton House (all located in Crawley, a suburb formerly part of the City of Subiaco), while a fourth one, the Metropolitan Sewerage Vents, is listed under Perth but located in multiple LGAs. The remainder is for the City of Subiaco.) are on the State Register of Heritage Places.

== List ==
The Western Australian State Register of Heritage Places, as of 2026, lists the following 34 state registered places within the City of Subiaco:

Place name	Place #	Street number	Street name	Suburb or town	Co-ordinates	Notes & former names	Photo
Nedlands Park Masonic Hall^{[1]}	1828	8	Broadway	Crawley	31.977593°S 115.814261°E		
Subiaco Primary School	2434	271	Bagot Road	Subiaco	31.950803°S 115.823094°E	Subiaco Public School, State School, Infants State, Senior School	
King Edward Memorial Hospital for Women	2438	Corner	Barker Road & Railway Parade	Subiaco	31.94969°S 115.8186°E	Main Entry Block, Agnes Walsh Nurses Home, Carson House, Harvey House, Industrial School	
Subiaco City Hall	2443	180	Hamersley Road	Subiaco	31.951783°S 115.820411°E		
Freemasons Hall (former), Subiaco	2444	181	Roberts Road	Subiaco	31.945653°S 115.832804°E		
Perth Modern School	2450	50 & 100	Roberts Road	Subiaco	31.945°S 115.8377°E		
Subiaco Fallen Soldiers' Memorial	2452	Lot 897	Rokeby Road	Subiaco	31.952286°S 115.823793°E	Memorial Clock Tower, Subiaco Clock Tower	
Subiaco Hotel	2453	455-465	Hay Street	Subiaco	31.9472°S 115.8242°E	Murphy's Hotel	
Regal Theatre	2454	474	Hay Street	Subiaco	31.9469°S 115.8238°E	Coliseum	
Shenton House^{[1]}	2457		University of Western Australia, Hackett Drive	Crawley	31.981249°S 115.819816°E	Crawley House	
St Joseph's Church and Presbytery	3266	1 & 9	Salvado Road	Subiaco	31.9429°S 115.8251°E	St Joseph's Roman Catholic Church	
West Leederville Railway Footbridge	3290		Railway Parade	Subiaco	31.942668°S 115.832909°E	Demolished in 2002. A sculpture named "Golden Bridge" was installed at the former bridge's location in 2005 to commemorate the former bridge.	
Hackett Memorial Buildings (University of Western Australia, UWA)^{[1]}	3519		off Mounts Bay Road	Crawley	31.976919°S 115.817992°E	Consists of the Administration Building (1930), Hackett Hall (1931), Winthrop Hall (including the Tower and Great Gateway - 1932), enclosing Whitfeld Court, and the Sunken Gardens	
Terrace Houses	3800	18-32	Catherine Street	Subiaco	31.945929°S 115.825833°E		
Carson House	4054	374	Bagot Road	Subiaco	31.949476°S 115.818173°E		
Industrial School (former)	4055		Barker Road	Subiaco	31.949029°S 115.818986°E	Harvey House	
Subiaco Theatre Centre	4653	180	Hamersley Road	Subiaco	31.951783°S 115.820411°E	Civic Hall, Rankin Gardens, Subiaco Arts Centre, The Hole in the Wall Theatre	
Electricity Substation, Hay Street	5424	195	Hay Street	Subiaco	31.947280°S 115.831836°E	State Electricity Commission Sub Station, Distribution Substation, Electric Light Station	
Subiaco Oval Gates	5478	304	Roberts Road	Subiaco	31.945143°S 115.828737°E	Subiaco Municipal Reserve	
Princess Margaret Hospital for Children (former), Subiaco	5568	1	Roberts Road	Subiaco	31.945754°S 115.838660°E	Chief Resident Medical Officer's Quarters (former), Godfrey House	
Kensington Private Maternity Hospital (former)	9173	Corner	Hensman Road & Heytesbury Road	Subiaco	31.954114°S 115.819216°E	Kensington Hospital, Subiaco, Brenda Cherry Centre (1981-2009)	
Wandana Apartment Block	9186	93	Thomas Street	Subiaco	31.949986°S 115.833754°E		
Attunga Flats, Subiaco	9187	103/105	Thomas Street	Subiaco	31.951181°S 115.832334°E	Apartments - Attunga	
Subiaco Oval	11923	304	Roberts Road	Subiaco	31.944444°S 115.830000°E		
Thomas Street State School Memorial Gates	13029		Thomas Street	Subiaco	31.945101°S 115.839629°E		
Australian Fine China, Subiaco	14465		Hay Street, Price Street, Atkinson Road, Mouritzen Way, Wunderlich Road & Wembley Crescent	Subiaco	31.945685°S 115.818291°E	Calyx Porcelain, Bristile Ltd, HL Brisbane and Wunderlich Limited	
Old Modernians War Memorial & Honour Roll, Perth Modern School	15689		Roberts Road	Subiaco	31.94543°S 115.837763°E		
Old Outpatients Building, Princess Margaret Hospital for Children	19873	1	Roberts Road	Subiaco	31.945754°S 115.838660°E	Part of Princess Margaret Hospital for Children (former), Subiaco (5568)	
Sunken Garden, University of Western Australia, UWA	19952		Mounts Bay Road	Crawley, Nedlands	31.976764°S 115.816683°E		
Footpath immediately to the Southern Perimeter Subiaco Oval	23441	304	Roberts Road	Subiaco	31.944444°S 115.830000°E	Contains the name of each Sandover Medal winner in plaques in the foothpath	
Metropolitan Sewerage Vents	23992			Shenton Park, East & West Perth, Highgate, Northbridge	31.956705°S 115.808469°E	Includes Sewerage Vent, Shenton Park (24815)	
Subiaco Children's Centre	24121	160	Hamersley Road	Subiaco	31.952123°S 115.821603°E		
Sewerage Vent, Shenton Park	24815		Gray Street	Shenton Park	31.956705°S 115.808469°E	Part of Metropolitan Sewerage Vents (23992 )	
Subiaco Oval Playing Field (excludes stands and surrounds)	25371	304	Roberts Road	Subiaco	31.944444°S 115.830000°E		

== Notes ==
- ^[1] Listed under both the City of Perth and City of Subiaco
