= Beryl Grant =

Australian nurse, and community worker

Beryl Grant AO OBE
- Born: 11 September 1921; Subiaco, Western Australia, Australia
- Died: 4 November 2017 (aged 96); Balcatta, Western Australia, Australia
- Occupation: Nurse
- Relatives: Agnes Robertson (adoptive mother)

Beryl Grant AO OBE (11 September 1921 – 4 November 2017) was an Australian nurse, community worker, and public servant.

== Early life ==
Grant was the daughter of Norman William Grant (1888–1927) and Annie (née Laurie; 1889–1935), born on 11 September 1921 in Subiaco, Western Australia, one of three siblings. Her father died when she was five and her mother died when she was 14; she was then adopted by Agnes Robertson, her godmother.

Grant attended Thomas Street State School and the Perth Girls' School. She trained as a nurse at the Perth Children's Hospital and King Edward Memorial Hospital, and then in 1957 won a Florence Nightingale Scholarship to study at the Royal Melbourne Hospital.

== Career ==
Grant returned to Western Australia in 1959 and was appointed matron of the Ngala Mothercraft and Training Centre, a nursing training facility in South Perth which also served as a residential home for unwed mothers and wards of the state. She held that position until 1980.

Grant reportedly played "an instrumental role in forcibly separating mothers and their young children" as part of forced adoption practices employed during her tenure at Ngala. In 2024, following the Inquiry into Past Forced Adoption in Western Australia, the chief executive of Ngala publicly apologised for the organisation's role in past forced adoptions. Grant had earlier denied in oral history interviews that any unwed mothers had been pressured into giving up their children.

In 1979, Grant was appointed as a special magistrate of the Perth Children's Court. In 1989 she also became chair of the Child Care Services Board, serving until 1996. She was a member of several state government task forces, and chaired an inquiry into prostitution in 1990.

In 1968, Grant was awarded a Winston Churchill Fellowship to study adoption and foster care overseas. She served for periods as state president of the Royal Australian Nursing Federation and president of the Australian College of Nursing, and was also on the board of the Australian Inland Mission. Grant was also prominent in the Uniting Church. In 1985, she became Moderator of the Synod of Western Australia, the first woman to hold that position. She served on the board of Uniting Care Homes (later Juniper Aged Care) from 1989 to 2003.

== Honours and legacy ==
Grant was made an Officer of the Order of the British Empire (OBE) in the 1976 New Year Honours, "in recognition of service to nursing". In 2000, she was made an Officer of the Order of Australia (AO), "in recognition of service to nursing and to the community through the support and development of services and programmes for children and families, particularly in rural and remote areas of Australia". A biography of Grant was published in 2002, written by Ian B. Tanner.

Grant died at a nursing home in Balcatta in November 2017, aged 97. A few weeks before her death, a multi-purpose facility was opened in Albany and named the Beryl Grant Community Centre in her honour.

In 2024, survivors of forced adoption petitioned Juniper Aged Care, the operators of the Beryl Grant Community Centre, to rename the facility. In response, Juniper's CEO stated that the centre had been named in recognition of Grant's role in aged care and that it was awaiting the release of further findings into Grant's role in forced adoptions before making a decision on naming.

The building formerly known as Beryl Grant Community Centre was renamed to Juniper Albany Community Centre on the 18 September 2025.
