= Patricia Kailis =

Australian geneticist and neurologist (1933–2020)

Patricia Verne Kailis AM, OBE, FTSE, FAICD
- Born: Patricia Verne Hurse; 19 September 1933; Castlemaine, Victoria, Australia
- Died: 17 April 2020 (aged 86)
- Education: Presbyterian Ladies' College, Melbourne, Melbourne University
- Known for: Predictive testing of Huntington's disease
- Spouse: Michael Kailis
- Children: 4
- Awards: OBE, Order of Australia, Centenary Medal of the Australian Government
- Scientific career
- Fields: Businesswoman, geneticist and neurologist
- Workplaces: Royal Perth Hospital, Princess Margaret Hospital and King Edward Memorial Hospital (all in Perth)

Patricia Verne Kailis (19 August 1933 – 17 April 2020) was an Australian businesswoman, geneticist and neurologist noted for her work in genetic counseling for neurological and neuromuscular disorders.

== Life and career ==
Kailis was born Patricia Verne Hurse in Castlemaine, Victoria. She attended Presbyterian Ladies' College in Melbourne and then studied medicine at Melbourne University. In 1958, she moved to Perth to work at Royal Perth, Princess Margaret and King Edward Memorial hospitals.

In 1960, she married Michael Kailis and the couple moved to Dongara, Western Australia, in 1961 to establish a crayfish factory. Here, Kailis became the local general practitioner. The couple also established themselves in ship building, the prawning industry in Exmouth, and the pearling industry in Broome.

In 1969 Kailis, her husband, and their four children (Maria, George, Amanda and Alex) moved back to Perth. Between 1970 and 1995, Kailis held honorary positions in neurology and genetics at Royal Perth Hospital. During this time, Kailis introduced a program for predictive testing of Huntington's disease and was involved in research into motor neuron disease and muscular dystrophy. In 1978, Kailis successfully contained the spread of disease in the family's pearl farms by insisting on hygienic practices in the processing of the oysters. In 1999, on the death of her husband Michael, Kailis became the Governing Director of MG Kailis Group of Companies.

She died at home on 17 April 2020.

== Awards and honours ==
In 1979, Kailis was appointed an Officer of the Order of the British Empire for her contributions in the fields of carrier detection and the detection of inherited diseases. In 1996 she was named a Member of the Order of Australia for her service to medicine as a genetic counselor for neurological and neuromuscular disorders to the Human Genetics Societies of WA, the Royal Perth Hospital and to Rocky Bay Inc for over 20 years. That same year, Kailis became a Fellow of the Australian Academy of Technological Sciences and Engineering.

In 2001, the Australian Government awarded Kailis the Centenary Medal for service to medicine and the community.

In 2010, Rocky Bay Inc opened the Patricia Kailis Centre in Cockburn Central. The Centre is dedicated to Kailis for her support of Rocky Bay over four decades. It provides therapy and support for families living with disabilities.
