= Agnes Robertson (politician) =

Australian politician (1882–1968)

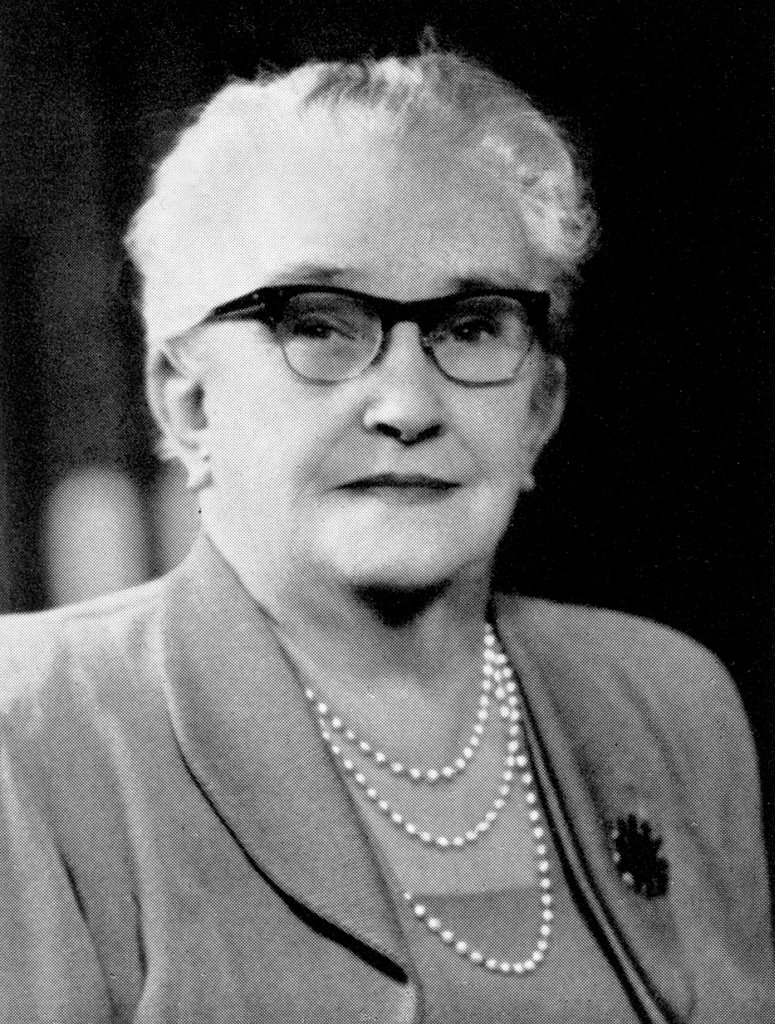

Senator for Western Australia
- In office 22 February 1950 – 30 June 1962

Personal details
- Born: Agnes Robertson Keay; 31 July 1882 Stepney, South Australia, Australia
- Died: 29 January 1968 (aged 85) Mount Waverley, Victoria, Australia
- Party: Nationalist (to 1945); Liberal (1945–1955); Independent (1955); Country (from 1955)
- Spouse: Robert Robertson (m. 1903–1912)
- Children: 4, including Jessie Robertson and Beryl Grant

Agnes Robertson Robertson (née Keay; 31 July 1882 – 29 January 1968) was an Australian schoolteacher, community worker and politician who served as a Senator for Western Australia from 1950 to 1962. She was originally elected to parliament as a member of the Liberal Party at the 1949 federal election. In 1955, she was dropped from her party's ticket due to her age, but instead won the endorsement of the Country Party and was re-elected to a second term at the 1955 election; her final term ended a month before her 80th birthday. She was the first woman to represent the Country Party in federal parliament.

== Early life ==
Agnes Robertson Keay was born on 31 July 1882 in Adelaide, South Australia, the only daughter among eight children born to Mary Ann (née Thomson) and David Kelly Keay. Her father – born in Perthshire, Scotland – was a stonemason by trade, and after arriving in Australia became a successful building contractor.

During her childhood Keay's family moved around the country as her father pursued various contracts, living for periods in Adelaide, Brisbane, and Sydney. She completed her secondary education in Sydney, obtaining a leaving certificate from the Forest Lodge Public School in Glebe just before her 14th birthday. A short time later, her family moved to Perth, where she qualified as a schoolteacher via the monitorial system. On 1 July 1903, she married journalist Robert Robertson, the editor of the Western Mail; the marriage bar in place at the time required her to give up teaching.

== Community work ==
Robertson returned to teaching after her husband's death in 1912, working at the Thomas Street State School in Subiaco until 1943. She served on the executive of the Western Australian Teachers' Union (including as vice-president for a period), and was a member of an appeals tribunal for pay disputes. Robertson was a devout Presbyterian, teaching Bible studies at the Ross Memorial Church and becoming one of the first women to serve as a lay preacher. She co-founded the Presbyterian Women's Missionary Union, and in 1937 represented Western Australia at the General Assembly of the Church of Scotland in Edinburgh. Robertson served on the councils of Presbyterian Ladies' College and the Presbyterian Home for the Aged, and supported a number of other community organisations. As secretary of the Free Milk and Nutritional Council, she successfully lobbied for the introduction of a free milk scheme for schoolchildren.

== Politics ==
=== Early involvement ===
Through her volunteer work, Robertson became acquainted with social campaigner Bessie Rischbieth and state MP Florence Cardell-Oliver, who encouraged her to seek public office. She stood for the Nationalist Party in North Perth at the 1943 state election, but polled only 17% of the vote. In 1945, Robertson became a foundation member of the new Liberal Party. She served on the party's federal women's committee, as well as heading the local women's section and sitting on the state executive.

=== Senator for Western Australia ===
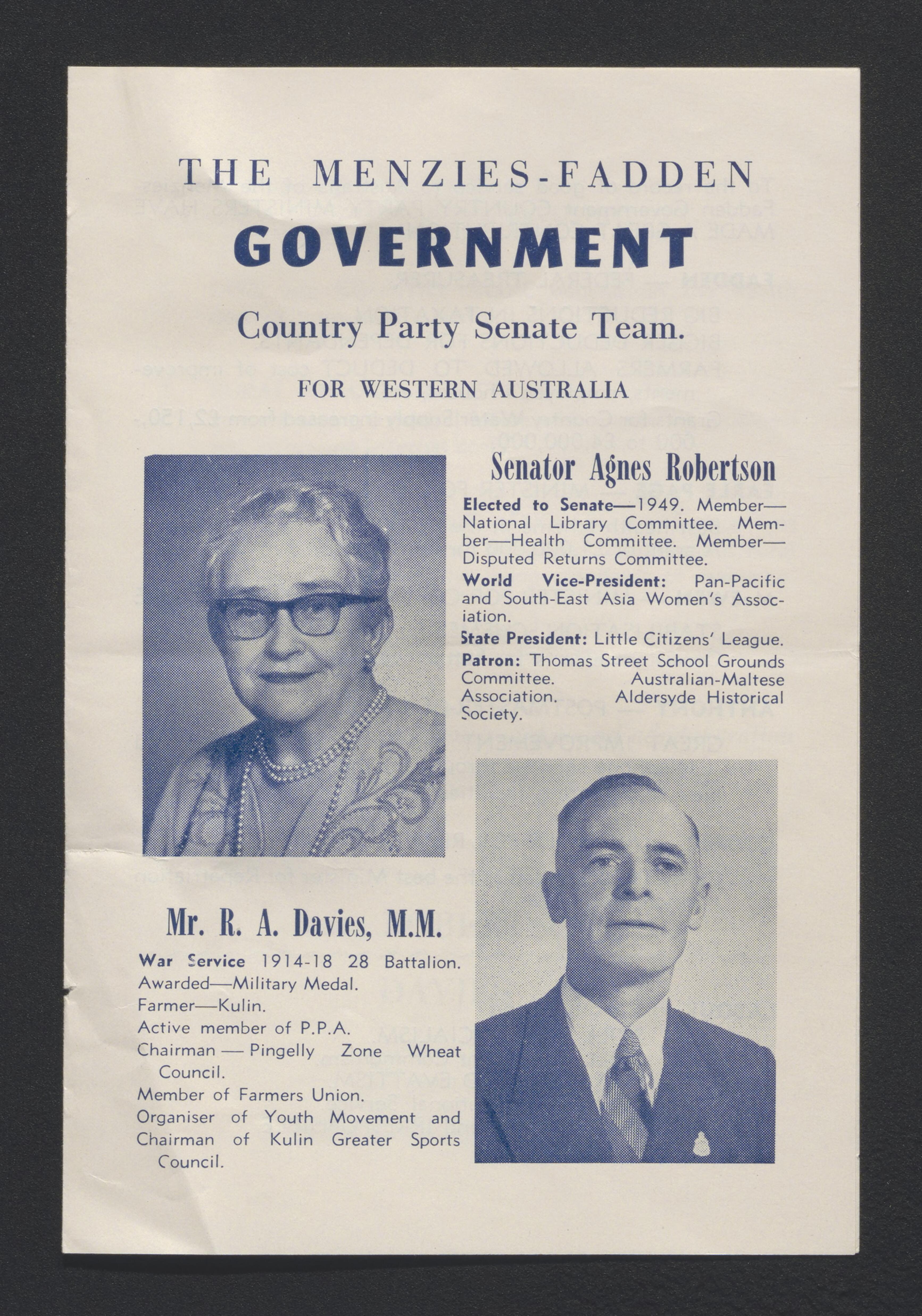
Promotional material used by Robertson at the 1955 election, her first as a Country Party candidate

At the age of 67, Robertson became the Liberal Party's lead Senate candidate in Western Australia at the 1949 federal election, the first woman to head a major party's ticket. She was one of ten female candidates, but only she and Ivy Wedgwood of Victoria were successful. Their election brought the total number of women in the Senate to four (out of 60), the others being Dorothy Tangney and Annabelle Rankin. Tangney – 25 years Robertson's junior – was also from Western Australia, which became the first state to have multiple female senators. Robertson's first term began on 22 February 1950. She was re-elected to a second term at the 1951 election (a double dissolution), again running as the Liberal Party's lead candidate.

While attending a conference in Manila in early 1955, Robertson was informed via telegram that she had been dropped from her party's ticket for the next election. Her replacement was George Branson, a 37-year-old farmer. When pressed on the issue, Prime Minister Robert Menzies confirmed that Robertson's age was the primary factor in her exclusion – she would be 73 at the time of the election, which was thought to be too old. (Note: Menzies cited a need to bring new talent into the party, but there was also a concern among some that Robertson would not survive another term; a death in office could hand control of the Senate to the Labor Party.) After unsuccessfully attempting to have her non-selection overturned on procedural grounds, Robertson resigned from the Liberal Party on 7 September 1955. She initially sat as an independent, promising to continue supporting the government in the Senate to maintain its narrow majority, but on 28 September joined the Country Party – the first woman to represent the party in federal parliament. She was subsequently chosen to head its two-member Senate ticket. (Note: Western Australia was the only state in which the Country Party ran separate candidates in the Senate. In all other states there was a joint ticket with the Liberal Party.) Robertson mounted a vigorous 40-day campaign targeted at women voters, making a tour of rural areas and giving a series of radio broadcasts. She ultimately defeated Branson for the final Senate seat by about 17,000 votes, aided by Labor and DLP preferences. The Sydney Morning Herald described her re-election as "the most piquant situation produced by the election".

In the Senate, Robertson almost always supported the Menzies Government, and remained a personal admirer of Menzies even after his public lack of support for her candidacy. She did cross the floor on at least one occasion, in 1954 opposing a bill that required public servants to retire at the age of 65. Robertson took a keen interest in foreign affairs, and in 1956 became the first woman to serve on the Joint Committee on Foreign Affairs. She was firmly anti-communist, speaking in favour of the Communist Party Dissolution Bill in 1950, and advocated closer relations with Southeast Asia as a defence against the domino effect. She led several Australian delegations to international women's conferences, and spoke frequently on women's and children's issues. With several of her Liberal colleagues, Robertson lobbied for the removal of the marriage bar in the Commonwealth Public Service; this was not achieved until 1966 Another pet topic was the conservation of historic buildings. Robertson did not re-contest her seat at the 1961 election, and her final term expired on 30 June 1962, a month before her 80th birthday.

== Personal life ==
Robertson kept a low profile in retirement. She died on 29 January 1968 while visiting family in Melbourne, and was cremated at Springvale Botanical Cemetery. She and her husband had three children together – John, Jessie, and Christie. Her father built them a house in West Perth when they married, which she would occupy for the rest of her life. Robertson became a widow at the age of 29; after several months of ill health, her husband died of tuberculosis on 24 May 1912. She raised her three young children with the help of her parents, and in 1935 adopted a fourth child, her 14-year-old god-daughter Beryl Grant (recently orphaned). Jessie followed her mother into politics, becoming head of the Country Party's federal women's committee, while Beryl became a prominent social worker.
