= Jessie Robertson =

Australian radio broadcaster and community leader

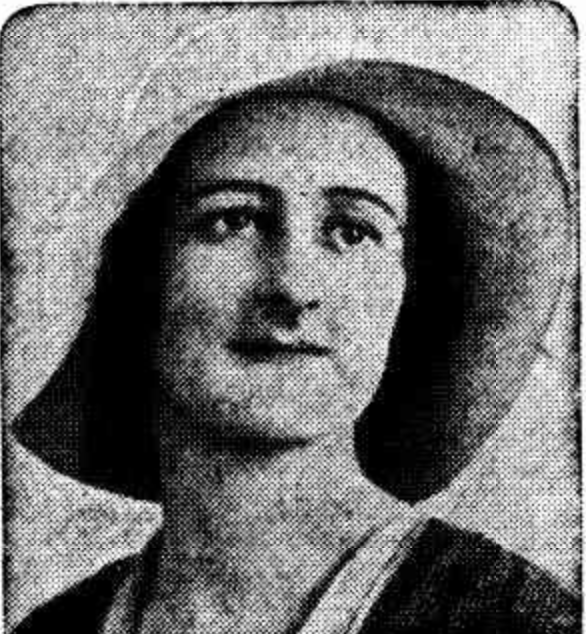
- Robertson c. 1933
- Born: 1 July 1909; West Perth, Western Australia
- Died: 22 June 1976 (aged 66); Claremont, Western Australia
- Occupation: Broadcaster
- Mother: Agnes Robertson

Jessie Marian Robertson (1 July 1909 — 22 June 1976) was an Australian radio broadcaster and community leader.

Robertson was born in West Perth, Western Australia, to Scottish-born journalist Robert Robertson and his wife Agnes, who would go on to become a member of the Australian Senate. Jessie attended Thomas Street State and Perth Modern schools, and after training as a home science teacher founded Phoebe's School of Domestic Art in 1931. She was a radio announcer on 6IX from the mid-1930s and became known as "Phoebe the Early Cook" or "Aunt Judy" for her cooking and children's shows respectively.

In December 1941, Robertson enlisted in the Australian Women's Army Service and was commissioned lieutenant in January 1942. She transferred to Victoria in May 1943 and was promoted to captain on 28 July. Her appointment ended with the war on 21 December 1945. She returned to her radio programs and revived many of her previous characters; she co-hosted the community program "Help Your Neighbour" from 1951 and covered Queen Elizabeth II's visit in 1954.

Robertson was a foundation member (1946) of the Business and Professional Women's Club of Perth, leading the Australian delegation to the seventh international congress at Montreal in 1956. She was also a foundation member of the AWAS Association of Western Australia (1947), the Soroptimist Club of Perth (1958) and the King Edward Memorial Hospital auxiliary (1958). She was state president of the National Council of Women (1956–1959 and 1966–1972) and of the Australian-Asian Association (1960–1965) and international president of the Pan-Pacific and South East Asia Women's Association (1961–1964). She stood several times as a Country Party candidate for federal office, but was defeated. She was elected to the Mundaring Shire Council in 1969 as the first female alderman, and was deputy president from 1972 to 1974.

Robertson died in 1976 of hypertensive heart disease at Alfred Carson Hospital, Claremont, and was cremated with Presbyterian forms.
