= Michael Kailis =

Western Australian businessman

Michael Kailis AM CBE
- Born: Michael George Kailis; 14 February 1929
- Died: 25 June 1999 (aged 70)
- Spouse: Patricia Kailis

Michael George Kailis AM CBE (14 February 1929 – 25 June 1999) was a Western Australian businessman who founded the MG Kailis Group of companies, whose head office is in Fremantle, Western Australia.

In 1960 he and his wife Patricia Kailis started a small rock lobster operation in Dongara, later expanding their interests into prawning, shipbuilding, aquaculture and the Kailis Jewellery line, built on pearls.

Kailis's parents emigrated to Australia from the Greek island of Kastelorizo. His cousin, Peter, founded the Red Rooster fast food chain.

== General references ==
- Hansen, Dorothy E.; Hansen, Ian V. (1999). The Captain's Grandson: the World of Michael Kailis. Fremantle: Fremantle Arts Centre Press. ISBN 0-646-37257-2. LCCN 2001409154. OCLC 43664711. OL 4022912M.
