= St Joseph's Church, Subiaco =

St Joseph's Church
- St Joseph's Roman Catholic Church
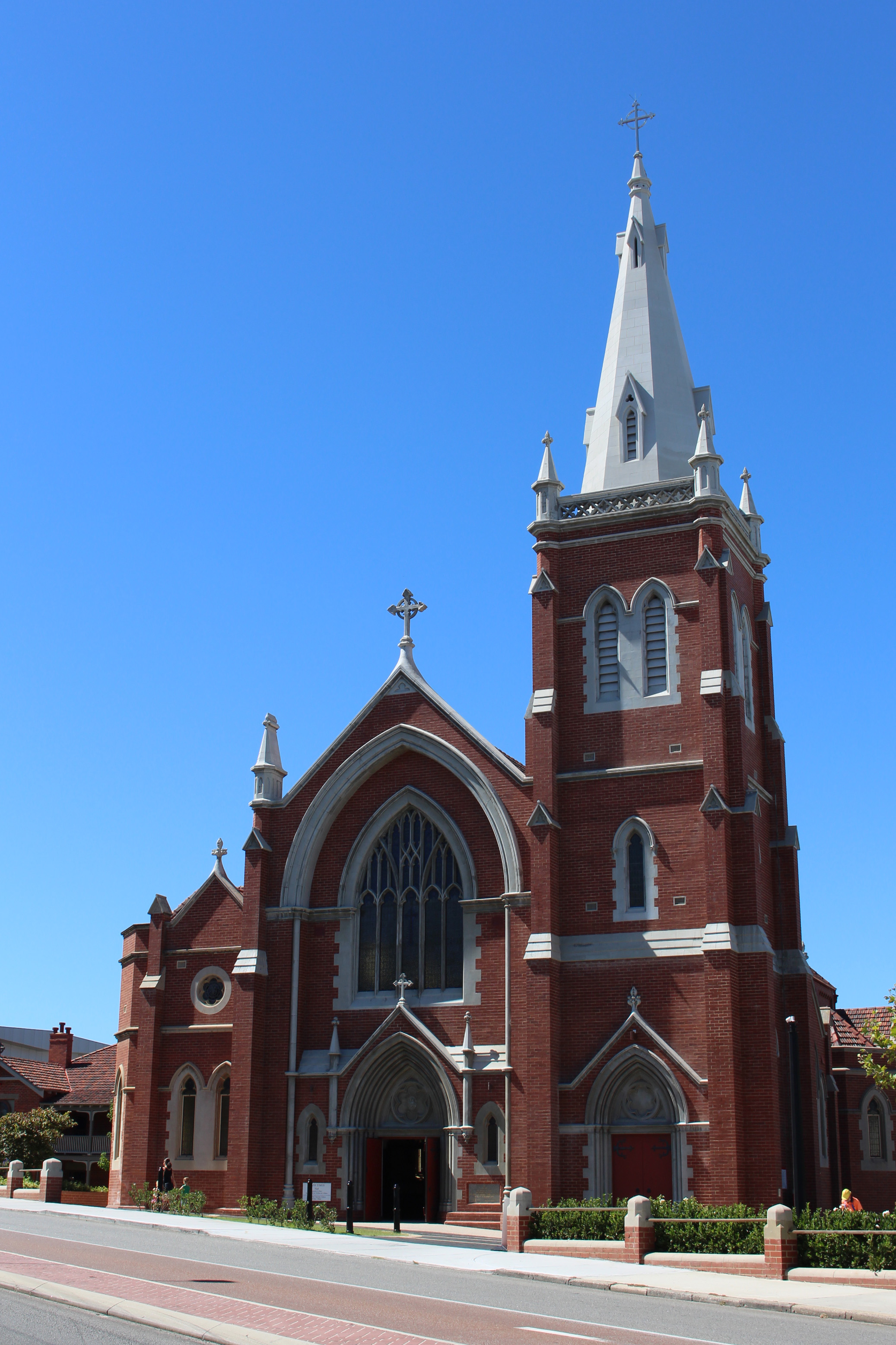
- St Joseph's Church
- 31.9429°S 115.8251°E
- Location: 3 Salvado Road, Subiaco, Western Australia
- Country: Australia
- Denomination: Catholic Church
- Website: stjosephssubiaco.org.au

History
- Status: Parish church
- Dedicated: November 1934

Architecture
- Functional status: Active
- Heritage designation: State Register
- Designated: 28 August 2001
- Architect: Edgar Le Blond Henderson
- Architectural type: Church
- Style: Interwar Gothic
- Years built: 1933–1934

Administration
- Archdiocese: Perth
- Parish: Subiaco

Clergy
- Priest: Very Rev Monsignor Kevin Long PhD PP

Western Australia Heritage Register
- Type: State Registered Place
- Designated: 28 August 2001
- Reference no.: 3266

St Joseph's Church is a Roman Catholic church in Subiaco, Western Australia. The church opened on 12 August 1934. It was designed in the Interwar Gothic style by architect Edgar Le Blond Henderson.

== History ==
In 1850, Bishop Serra and some of his monks arrived in the area which he named Subiaco, which it still is known as. By 1859, a Benedictine monastery had been built, and Bishop Serra had departed to Rome.

Over the next six years, what remained of Bishop Serra's monks left for New Norcia or to join the Perth Diocese. The monastery later became an orphanage for boys under sponsorship of the St. Vincent de Paul Society, until it was badly damaged by a storm in 1879 and was unable to be rebuilt. At this time, the Fremantle-Guildford Railway had been completed, and an unnamed platform had been built at current-day Subiaco, where the first family settlement was built: the Jones family home, which became known as "Jones' Folly".

In 1897, the Sisters of Saint John of God arrived, with a small convent, 10-room hospital, a small stone 'Convent Church' which doubled as a school.

The church was officially blessed and opened on the 12th of August, 1934, one year after the foundation stone was laid. The bell was installed in 1952.

== Gallery ==
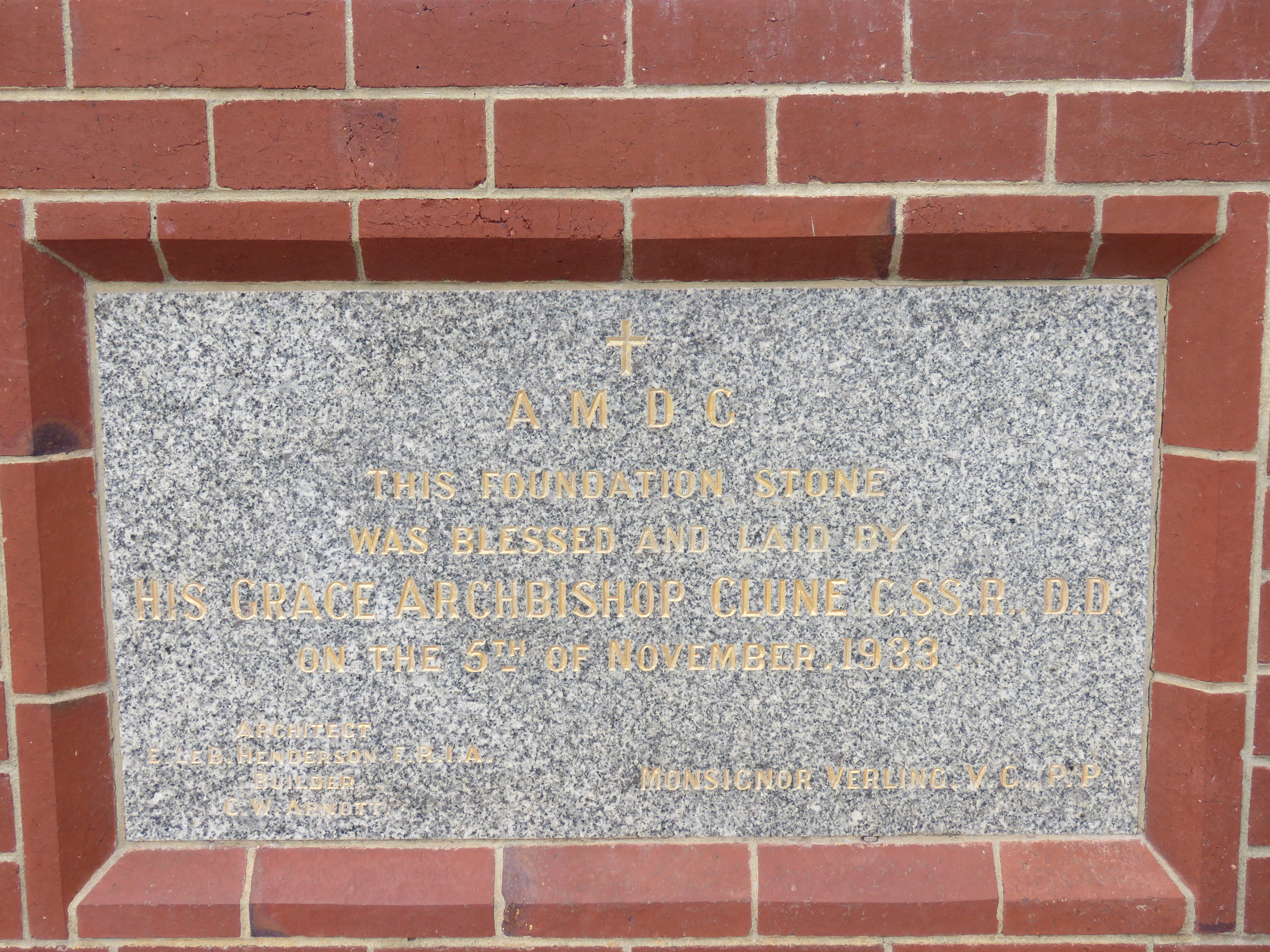
The foundation stone of St Joseph's.

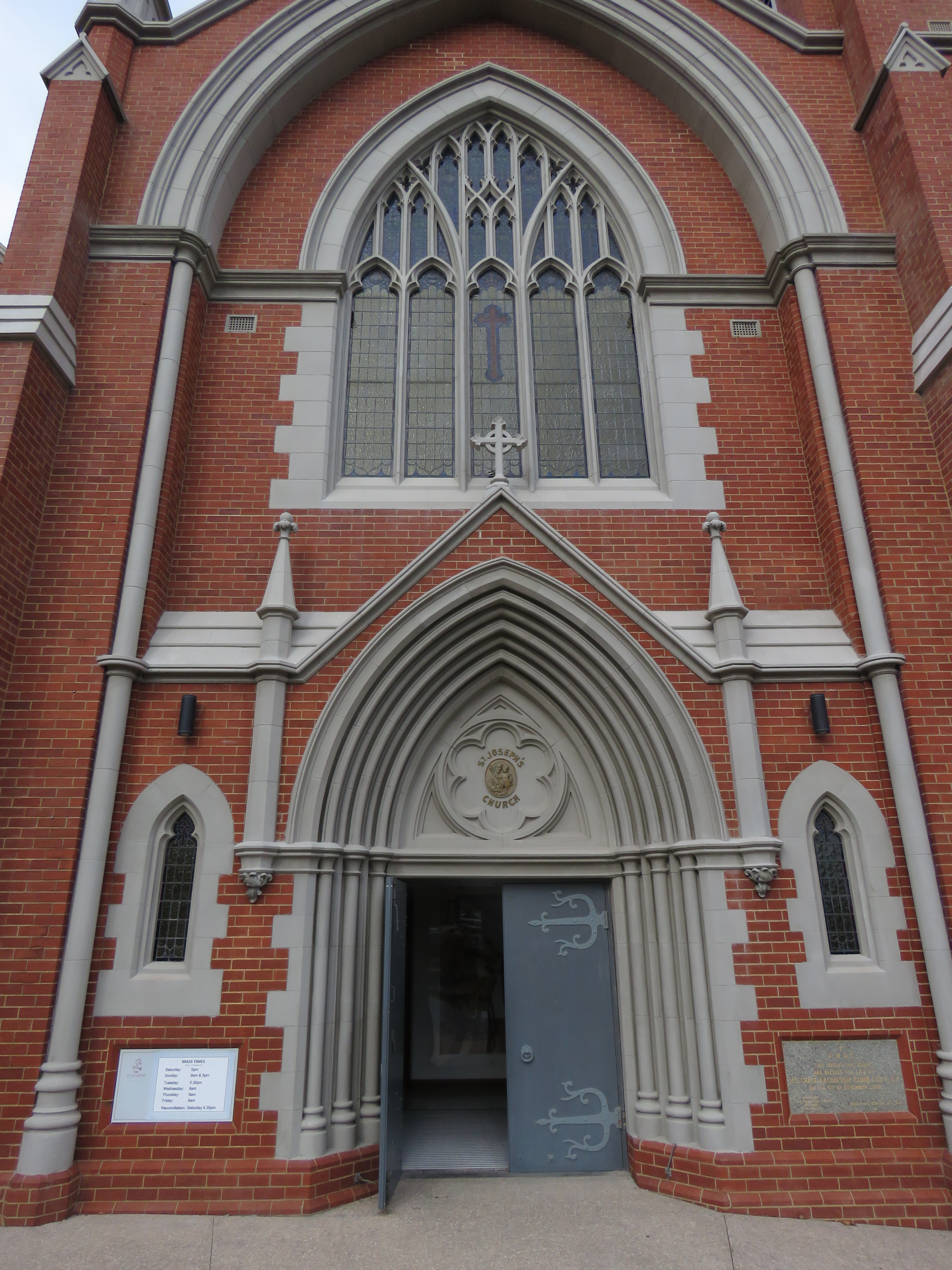
Front view of the church.

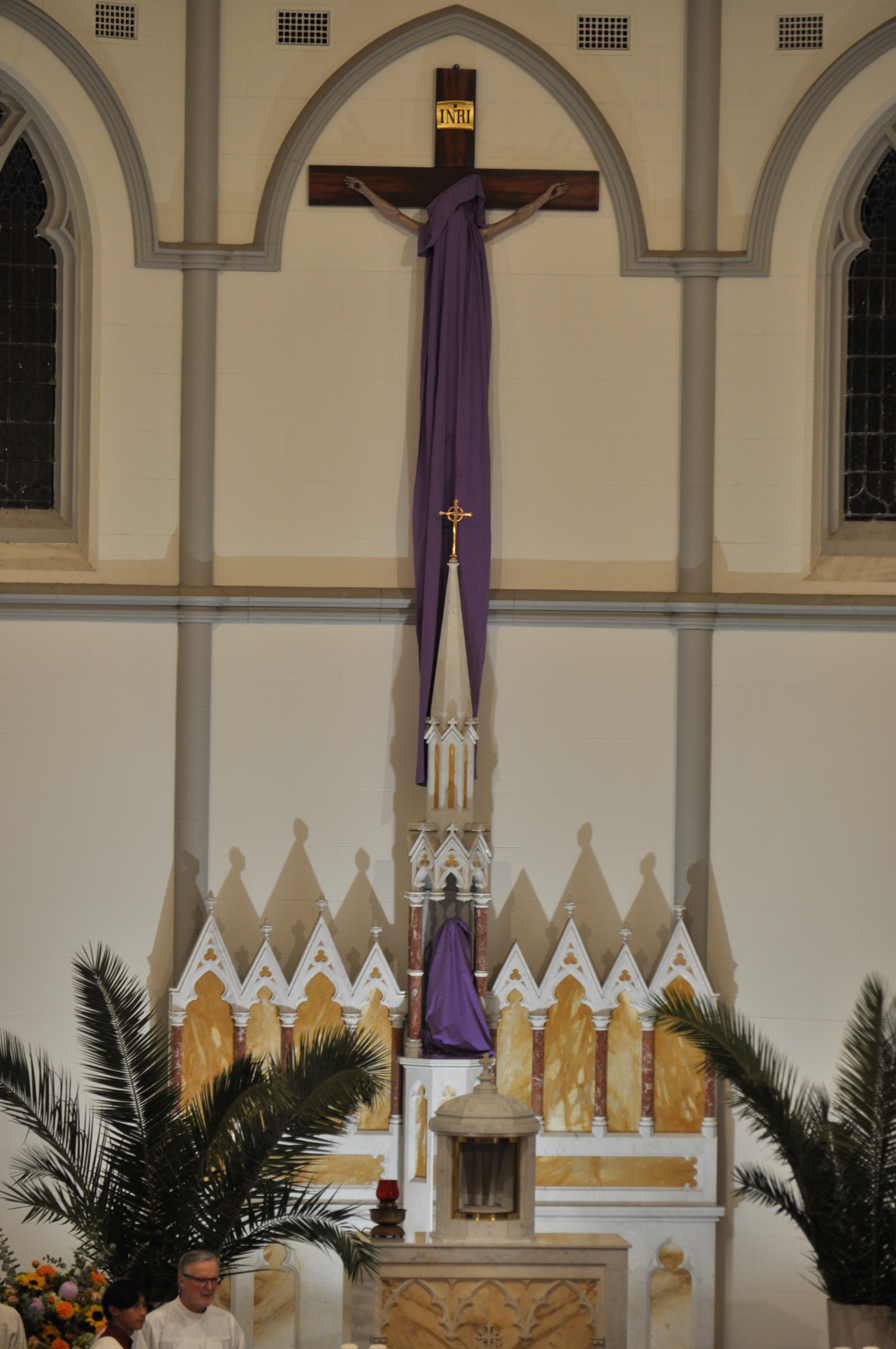
The sanctuary, on Holy Thursday.
