= Chesters' Subdivision Conservation Area, Subiaco =

Heritage area in Subiaco, Perth, Western Australia

Chesters' Subdivision Conservation Area
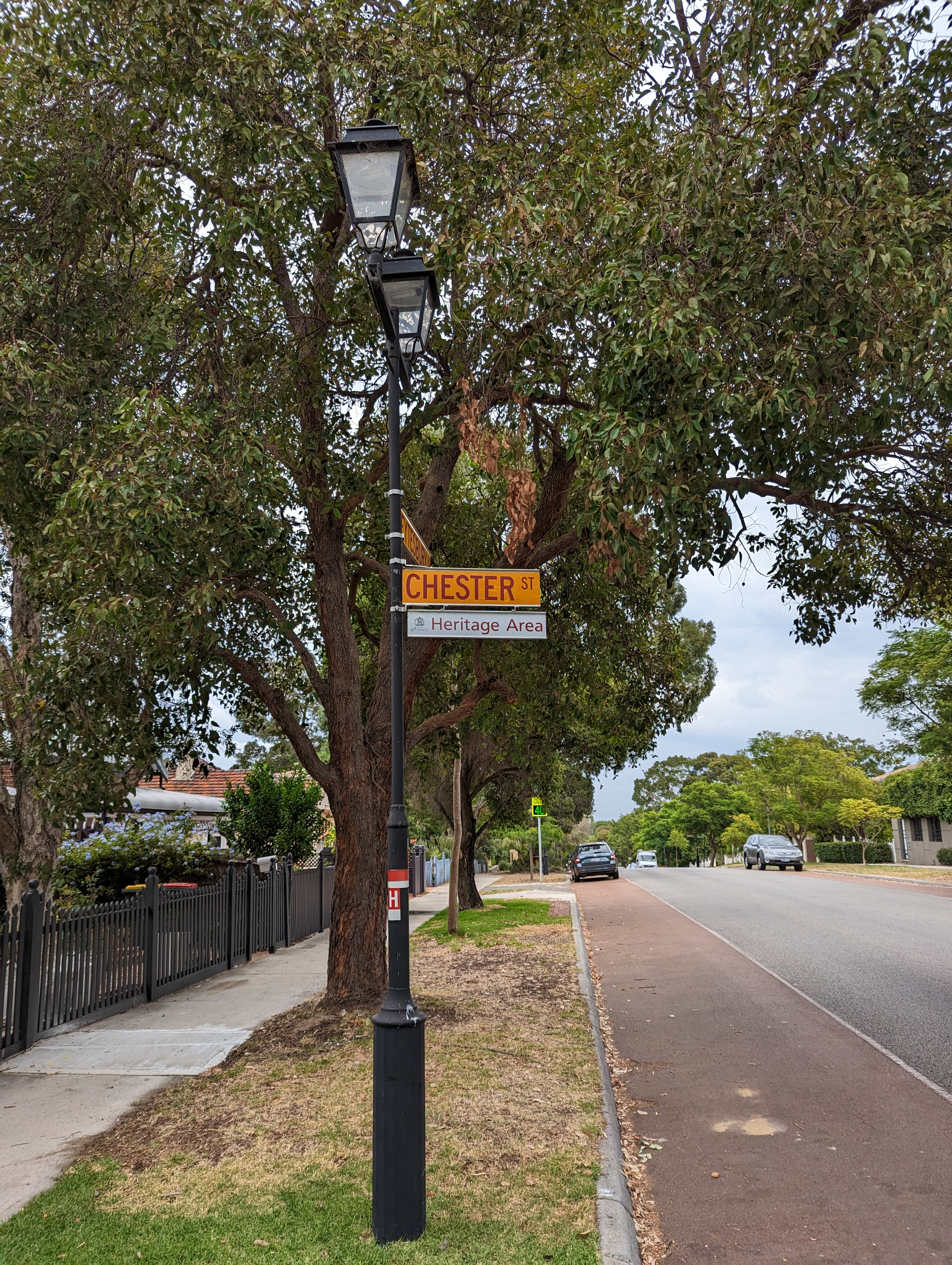
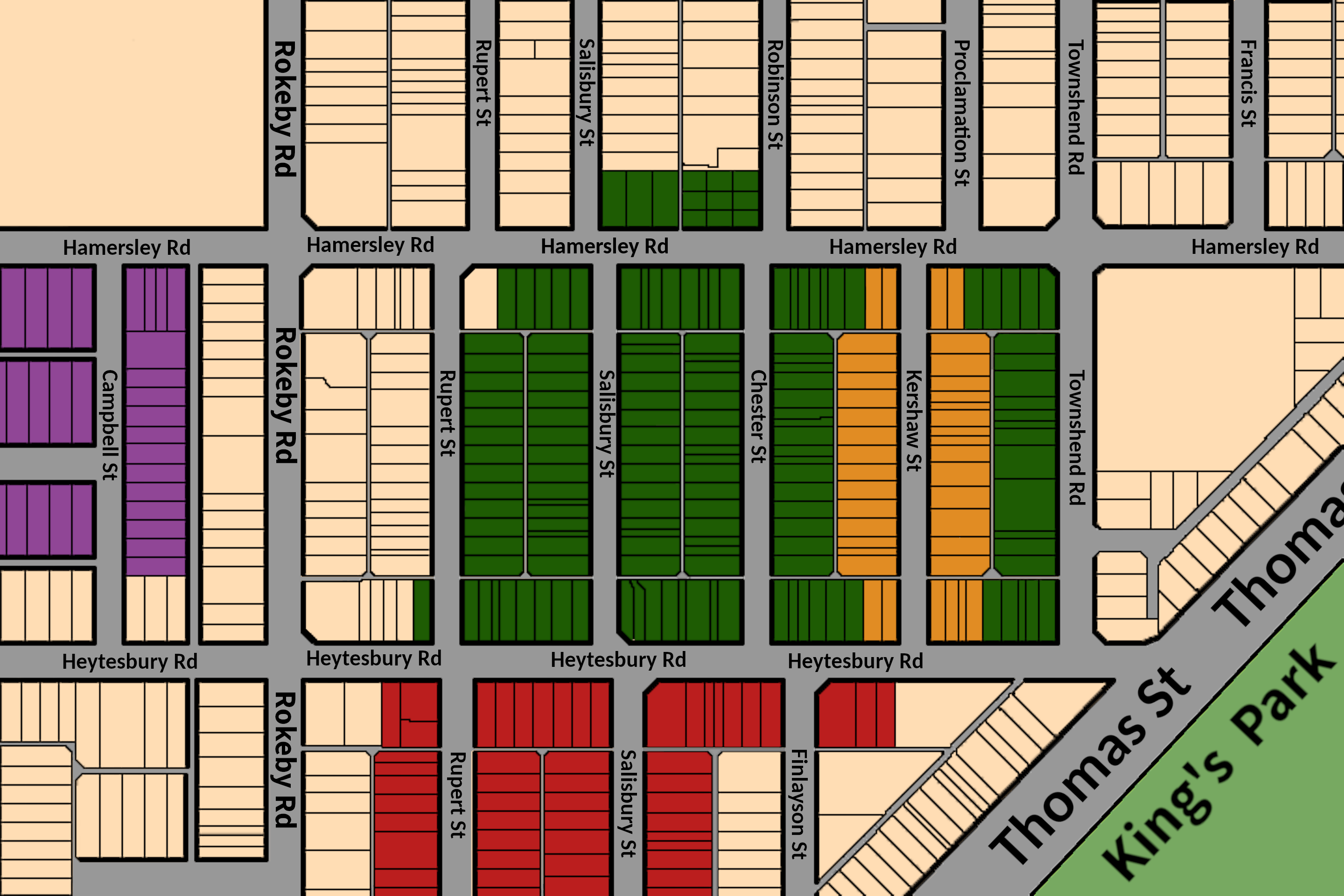
- Chester Street, Subiaco Chesters' Subdivision Conservation Area Kershaw Street Heritage Area Salisbury & Rupert Street Heritage Area Union & Redfern Heritage Area

- Coordinates: 31.95340°S 115.82662°E
- Country: Australia
- State: Western Australia
- City: Subiaco
- LGA: City of Subiaco
- Established: 1892, Heritage listed 2014

Population
  - Total: Unknown

The Chesters' Subdivision Conservation Area, also referred to as the Chesters' Subdivision Heritage Area, is a historical heritage area in Subiaco, Perth, named after James Chesters, (Note: "CITY OF SUBIACO PLANNING POLICY 3.9 CHESTERS' SUBDIVISION HERITAGE AREA" 'For its association with the subdivision of this area by James Chesters, an investor from Melbourne, in 1892. In this context it also represents the status of Western Australia as a place of opportunity during the gold rush era of the late nineteenth century – attracting significant initial investment form the eastern states.') an investor, property developer and later mayor of Subiaco, who developed the area. It contains many suburban houses from the Federation period of architecture.

== History ==
=== Initial development ===
The area was first developed by James Chesters who made it into a subdivision of his properties (bounded by Townsend Street, Heytesbury Street, Rokeby Street and Hamersley Street) that he purchased in October 1891. Chesters began to sell plots in 1892, and the first home in the subdivision, named Stratmore, was built in 1905 on Chester Street, on lots 133 and 136. Many people of different classes lived in the area, from wealthy businessmen contrasted to junior tradesmen and white-collar workers, with large luxurious villas next to more restrained small family homes. (Note: City of Subiaco Local Planning Policy 3.9: 'The history of the houses helps to demonstrate the original settlement of this part of Subiaco as a solid middle class area, in which the family residences of more senior white-collar workers existed side by side with the smaller, but still well-built, houses of more junior white-collar workers, retail employees and tradespeople.') Many of the smaller homes used the Californian bungalow style, though with restraint due to the smaller budgets of lower class workers.

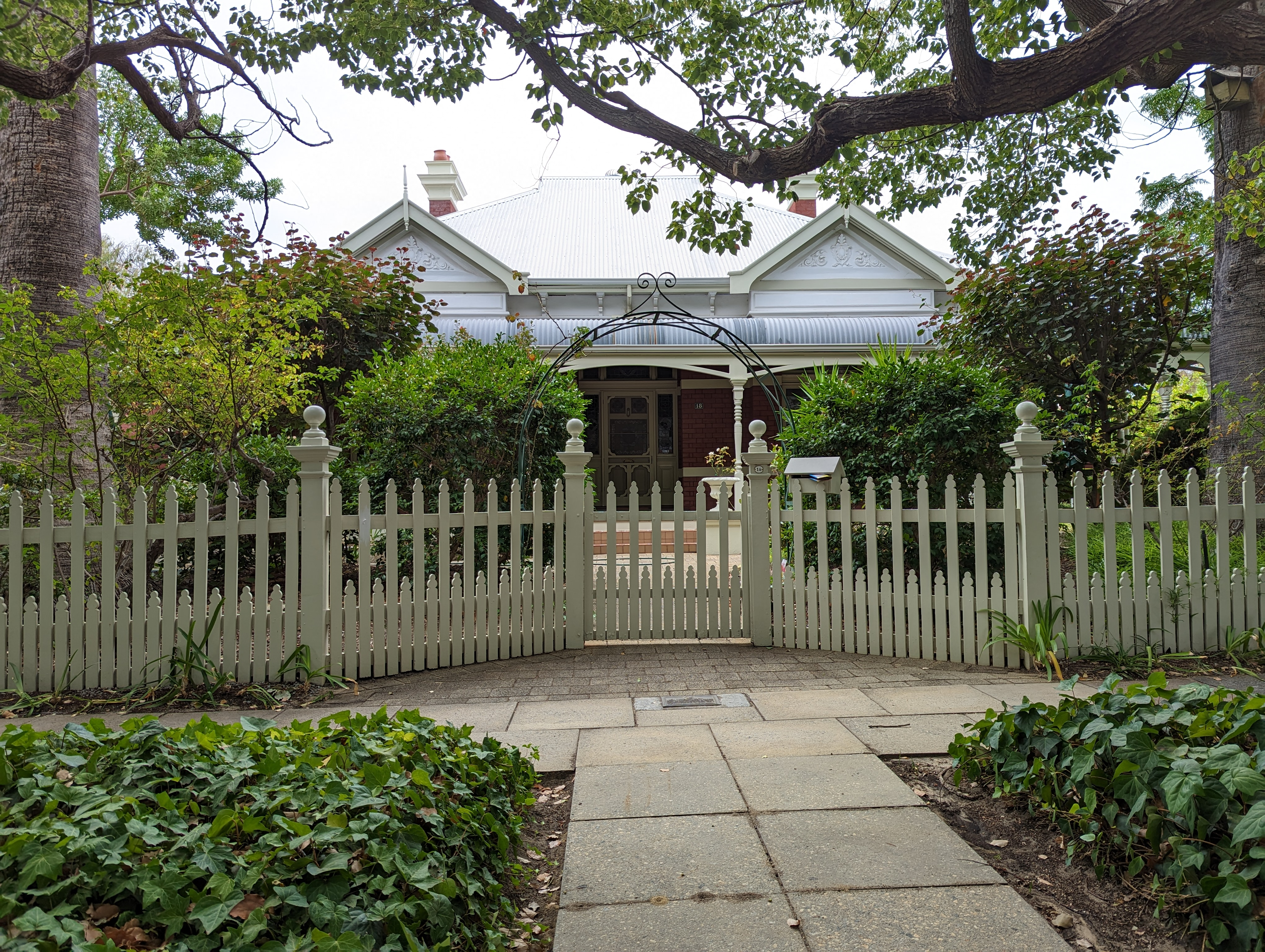
Stratmore villa in Subiaco

In 1922, Chesters was investigated by a royal commission for selling lots in the subdivision multiple times before the owners' contracts had lapsed.

=== Heritage listing ===
The area was listed as a heritage area on 2 December 2014 in the City of Subiaco's local planning policy, to "conserve the cultural significance of the heritage area".

==== Expansion ====
On 28 June 2022, in a meeting of the council, the City of Subiaco endorsed an expansion of the Chesters' Subdivision Conservation Area after a review of the West Subiaco Local Heritage Survey and a proposal to expand it by residents of Subiaco. 14 properties nearby to the area were added to the conservation area as a result of the expansion.
