= Uniting Church in Australia, Synod of Western Australia =

The Synod of Western Australia is the entity of the Uniting Church in Australia covering most of the state of Western Australia, south of a line near Port Hedland. It is one of six geographically-based Synods of the church. The leader of the Synod is the moderator elected to the position for a period of three years.

The Uniting Church has a series of inter-related councils, which do not strictly represent a hierarchy. The National Assembly is responsible for issues of doctrine. Each state has a Synod which is responsible for property. Presbyteries are responsible for the selection, training and oversight of ministers.

== Presbyteries ==
A synod may relate to a number of Presbyteries within its bounds. The Synod of Western Australia previously had five presbyteries, but in 2006 the presbyteries merged, and the structure simplified so that now there is one presbytery covering the same area as the synod.

The original presbyteries in Western Australia before merging to one were:

- North West
- Peel
- Perth
- Stirling
- Swan

== Education ==
The Perth Theological Hall provides theological education for the Uniting Church in Western Australia. It is part of the Perth College of Divinity.

Uniting Church schools connected to the Synod of Western Australia are:

- Methodist Ladies' College
- Penrhos College
- Presbyterian Ladies' College
- Scotch College
- Wesley College
- St. Stephens School
- Tranby College

Trinity Residential College is a residential college of the Uniting Church in Australia at the University of Western Australia.

== Moderators ==
date	name
2023–	Rev Dr Ian Tozer
2020–2023	Susy Thomas
2014–2020	Rev Steve Francis
2011–2014	Rev Ron Larkin
2008–2011	Rev Ken Williams
2005–2008	Robert Watson
1985–?	Beryl Grant
1977–1979	Ronald Wilson
