= Subiaco Hotel =

Heritage listed hotel in Subiaco, Western Australia

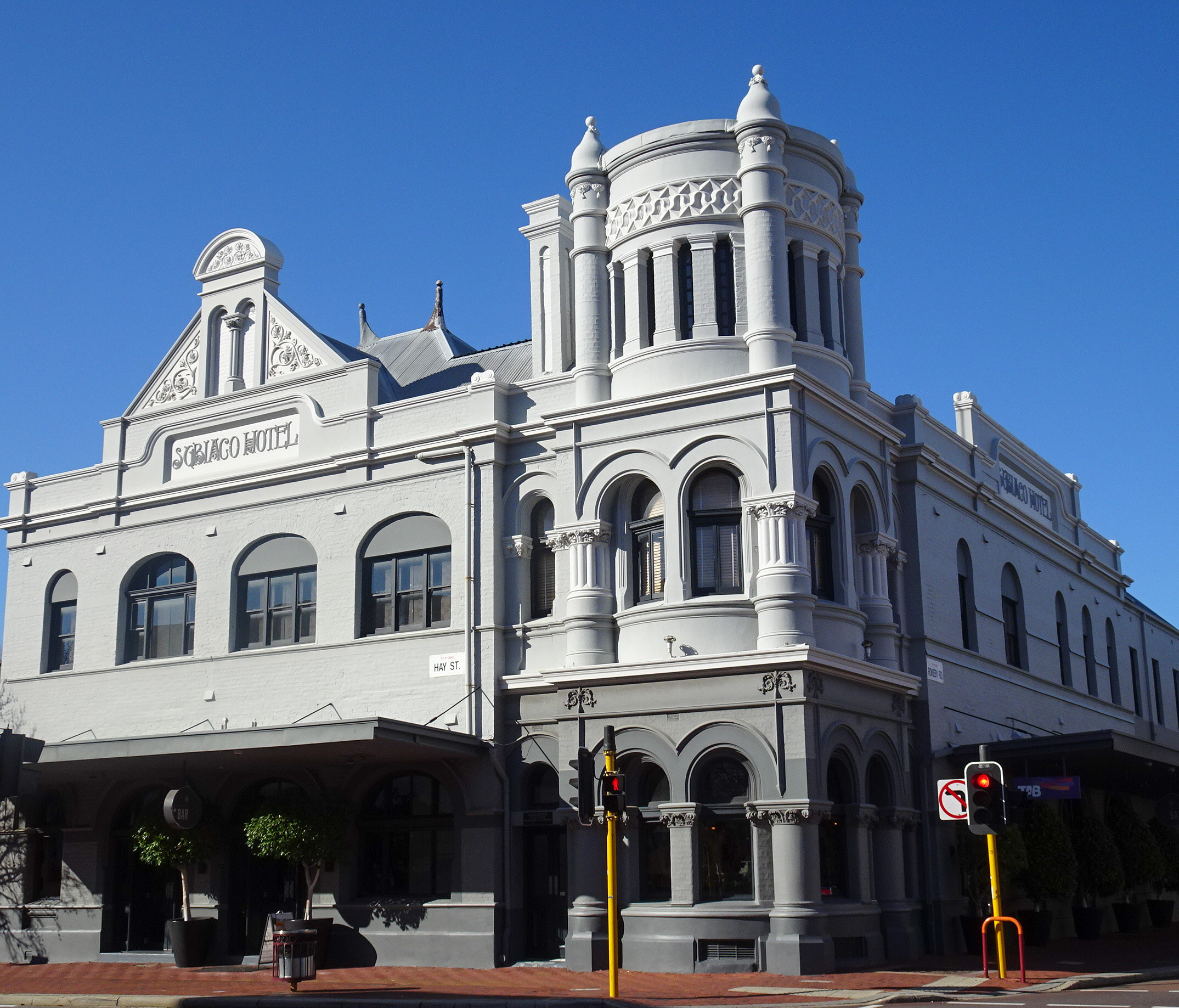

General information
- Location: Australia, 455–465 Hay Street; Subiaco, Western Australia
- Coordinates: 31.9472°S 115.8242°E
- Opening: c. 1897

Technical details
- Floor count: 2

Design and construction
- Architect: Henry Stirling Trigg

Website
- Website

Western Australia Heritage Register
- Type: State Registered Place
- Designated: 20 October 2015
- Reference no.: 2453

The Subiaco Hotel is a historic hotel in Subiaco, Western Australia. It is located at 455–465 Hay Street, at the corner of Rokeby Road, and dates back to the state's gold rushes era of the 1890s.

== History ==
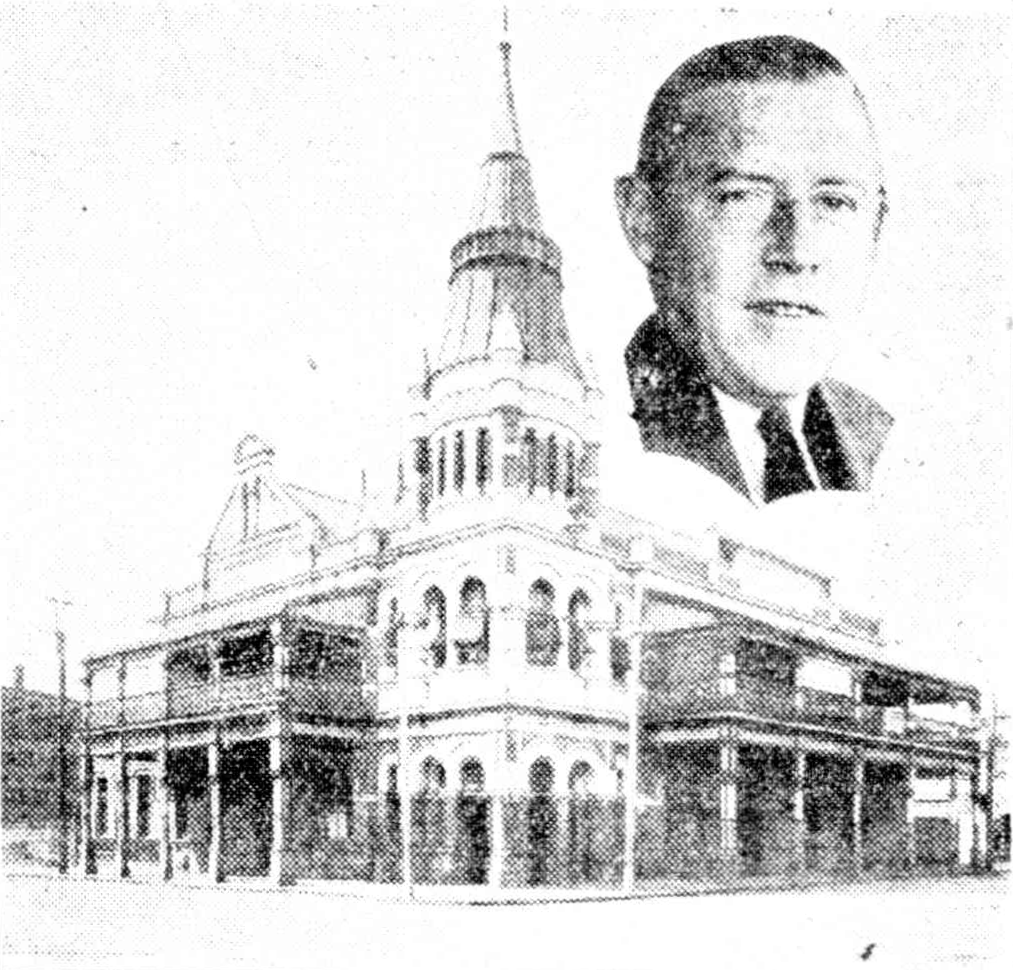
Subiaco Hotel in 1931, before the steeple and verandahs were removed. Inset is Reg Williams, who took over as licensee that year.

In 1896, the land where the hotel now stands was purchased by Ernest McGillicuddy. The land had been subdivided ten years earlier, from a lot originally granted to the Roman Catholic Bishop of Perth, Martin Griver. McGillicuddy obtained a building licence, and soon thereafter sold the property to the Stanley Brewing Company. The company completed construction of the Subiaco Hotel, designed by architect Henry Stirling Trigg. The opening date is unknown, but it was due to open shortly after September 1897. In that year it was listed in the rates books, and by 1899 was already considered a landmark.

The hotel's proprietor and manager for the first five years was J.B. Murphy. When Daniel Connor, a director of the Stanley Brewing Company, died in January 1898, his family – wife Catherine, sons Michael and Maurice, and son-in-law Timothy Quinlan – inherited the hotel. In 1904, the Subiaco Hotel was extended to cater for the growing area of Subiaco, with a two-storey addition at the rear, and another single-level extension along Hay Street.

The hotel has undergone significant changes since the 1950s. Architect Reginald Summerhayes was initially commissioned to renovate bathrooms and bedrooms, raise windows on the upper storey, and put in a new roof. Later, in 1957, Summerhayes was once more engaged to design a new single-storey structure on Hay Street, including a garden lounge. The works also removed the original balconies. The imposing steeple was removed in 1963 due to termite damage, and by 1964 a drive-through bottle shop was operating out of what had been a garage and store room. Further works by Summerhayes in 1972 removed the cocktail bar, and a new entrance was incorporated.

A 1984 refurbishment began restoring the historic site closer to its initial appearance, including removing carpeting and replacing bars. Further work was undertaken from 2012 to 2014, following a 2008 conservation plan. The restoration was both internal and external, including adding additional awnings.

Quinlan died in 1927, and thereafter the company was known as the Connor Quinlan Estate; but ownership of the Subiaco Hotel remained within the family for several generations. The hospitality business was sold to Michael and Judy Monaghan in 1969, and in 1990 they bought a 27% share of the building. The Monaghans and other owners sold both the building and the business in September 2019 to Dave Allan and Lawson Douglas, owners of the Rose Hotel in Bunbury and the Exchange Hotel in Kalgoorlie.

== Description ==
The Subiaco Hotel is a two storey brick building, with stucco and iron roof. It was designed in the Federation Romanesque style. On the corner of the building is an imposing three storey tower, which used to have a spire. The outside walls, painted grey, feature decorative elements – cornices, pediments, Corinthian pilasters, pier caps, and mouldings with floral decorations.

The main dining room is on the ground floor, now used as a bar and kitchen. The upper level is accessed from a reconstructed timber staircase, and has rooms with verandahs along a U-shaped floor plan. All the rooms have timber floors, but only some are the original timber. The upper stair lobby and sitting rooms remain mostly unchanged from the various renovations.
