= Subiaco, Western Australia =

Subiaco
- Suburb
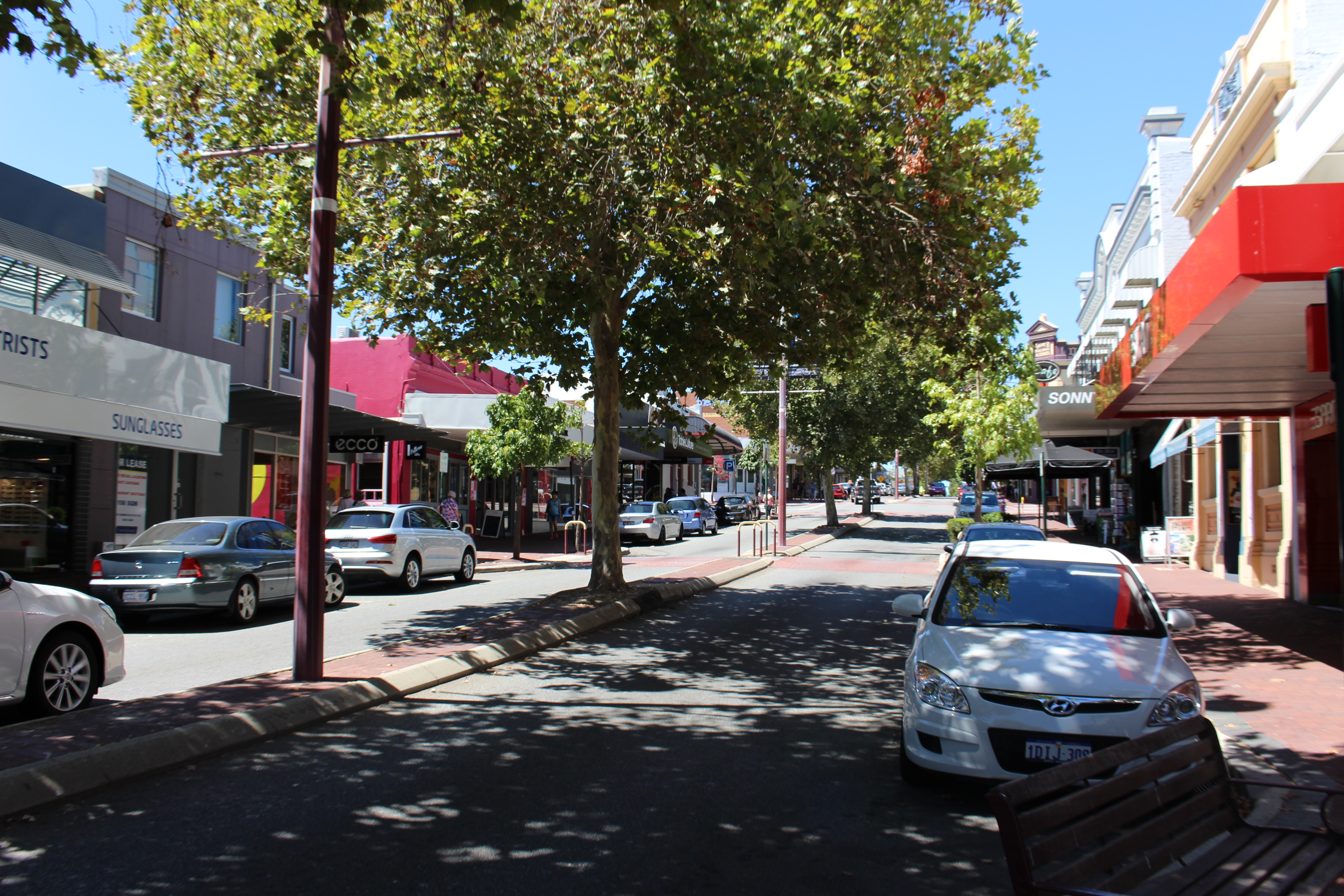
- Rokeby Road, Subiaco
- Interactive map of Subiaco
- Coordinates: 31.950°S 115.825°E
- Country: Australia
- State: Western Australia
- City: Perth
- LGAs: City of Subiaco; Town of Cambridge
- Location: 4 km (2.5 mi) W of Perth CBD
- Established: 1851

Government
  - State electorate: Nedlands
  - Federal division: Curtin

Area
  - Total: 3.2 km^{2} (1.2 sq mi)

Population
  - Total: 9,940 (SAL 2021)
- Postcode: 6008
Suburbs around Subiaco
Jolimont	Wembley	West Leederville
Daglish	Subiaco	West Perth
Shenton Park	Shenton Park	Kings Park

Subiaco (/ˌsuːbiˈækoʊ/ SOO-bee-AK-oh), known colloquially as Subi, is an inner-western suburb of Perth, the capital of Western Australia. It is approximately 3 km (1.9 mi) west of Perth's central business district, in the City of Subiaco local government area. Historically a working-class suburb containing a mixture of industrial and commercial land uses, since the 1990s the area has been one of Australia's most celebrated urban redevelopment projects. It remains a predominantly low-rise, urban village neighbourhood centred around Subiaco train station and Rokeby Road.

The suburb has three schools: Subiaco Primary School, Perth Modern School, which is the state's only fully academically selective public school, and Bob Hawke College. Landmarks in Subiaco include Subiaco Oval, which formerly was the largest stadium in Western Australia, King Edward Memorial Hospital for Women, and Subiaco railway station.

== Geography ==
Subiaco is located approximately 3 km (1.9 mi) west of the central business district (CBD) of Perth, the capital and largest city of the state of Western Australia. Subiaco is 6 km (3.7 mi) east of the Indian Ocean, and 2 km (1.2 mi) north of the Swan River. It is bounded to the south-east by Thomas Street, to the south by Nicholson Road, to the west by Railway Road, Hay Street, Tighe Street, Upham Street and Bishop Street, and to the north by Salvado Road and Railway Parade, except for a small part covering St John of God Subiaco Hospital protruding north to Cambridge Street. To the north is Wembley and West Leederville. To the east is West Perth and Kings Park. To the south is Shenton Park. To the west is Daglish and Jolimont, Western Australia.

Subiaco lies on Spearwood Dunes, which formed around 40,000 years ago. The dunes consist of brown sand lying over yellow subsoil, with Tamala Limestone below. These dunes are part of the greater Swan Coastal Plain.

== History ==
=== Early history ===
Prior to European settlement, the area was inhabited by the Mooro group of the Whadjuk Noongar people. They were led by Yellagonga and inhabited the area south of the Swan River, as far east as Ellen Brook and north to Moore River.

In 1829, the Swan River Colony (the precursor to Western Australia) was founded by the British. Initial development of the colony was slow, and settlement followed the coast and the Swan River. In January 1846, a group of missionaries led by John Brady, the first Catholic Bishop of Perth, arrived at the port of Fremantle. Among them were Joseph Benedict Serra and Rosendo Salvado, two Spanish Benedictine monks.

Brady decided to establish three missions in regional area. In 1846 or 1847, the Catholic Church acquired two lots of land near Herdsman Lake, north of the modern day Subiaco. In 1849, Serra replaced Brady. He then decided to establish a monastery near Perth, selecting the land near Herdsman Lake. It was named the Benedictine Monastery of New Subiaco, after Subiaco, Italy, where the Benedictines were established. Starting in 1857, the monks began to leave for the monastic town of New Norcia. The last monks left in 1864. In the early 1870s, the St Vincent’s Boy’s Orphanage started occupying the former monastery. The only buildings remaining of the monastery today are the heritage-listed Benedictine Stables, on Barrett Street in Wembley.

In the 1860s and 1870s, investors began buying land in the area, speculating that a railway line would be built eventually. In 1871, a railway line between Fremantle and Guildford was first proposed, following on from the success of railways in Sydney and Melbourne. In 1874, two possible routes were suggested: one traveling north of the Swan River, and one travelling south of the river. In July 1878, the northern route was chosen. Construction on the railway began in 1879, and it was opened on 1 March 1881, as the Fremantle to Guildford railway line. The first station in Subiaco opened in 1883, as just a basic siding, east of the present day Subiaco railway station, at Salvado Road. The station was used to deliver goods, and serve the St Vincent’s Boy’s Orphanage. As more people started living along the line though, the station started serving as a passenger station for the general public.

In the 1880s and 1890s, Western Australia experienced several gold rushes, causing a rapid increase in population across Perth. On 13 March 1883, the Government of Western Australia announced it would survey an area of commonage to create suburban lots, to put up for sale. This covered the area bounded by Thomas Street, Aberdare Road, and the railway line, taking up most of Subiaco, and part of Shenton Park. The land was surveyed by Gilbert H. Rotton, who set out the streets in a traditional grid pattern, with large lots. The area north of Roberts Road (known then as Mueller Road) was retained by the government, for a school, recreation, and future purposes. The first auction occurred in November 1883. Most of the land was sold over the following two years. A separate piece of land, between Subiaco Road and the railway line, was subdivided and sold too.

=== Development ===
In 1886, the construction of Subiaco's first house started. It was built on Mueller Road, near Rokeby Road, by reporter, editor and former convict John Rowland Jones. It was named "Jones' Folly", due to the time it took to construct, and its isolation. The building was demolished in 1959. Several wealthy land developers from the eastern colonies of Australia purchased lots in Subiaco, and subdivided them further, creating new streets to serve the smaller lots. Many of the lots they sold were to new arrivals in Western Australia in the 1890s, who had come due to the gold rushes. Many of these people came from Victoria, and were working class, young couples, with small children. These people built makeshift structures on their lots, such as tents and tin shacks. Later that decade, houses, mostly made of timber, were erected in stages at a time. In 1895, the population of the area was 100. By mid-1896, it was 1300.

1896 saw the establishment of several services in Subiaco. The first school opened that year, albeit permanent buildings were only complete in 1897. The school officially opened on 12 May 1897. A post office opened as well in 1896. These two services were built on Rokeby Road, as that was the first road to be macadamised. The macadamisation in part caused Rokeby Road to become the commercial centre of Subiaco. The Subiaco Progress Association was established in 1896. They lobbied for the formation of the Subiaco Road District, which was then created on 10 April 1896. The first chairman of the Subiaco Road Board was Charles Hart, who was Secretary of the Subiaco Progress Association. By the end of 1896, the population of the Subiaco Road District was above 2000, allowing the Road Board to apply to become a municipality. The government granted the request, and so the Municipality of Subiaco was gazetted on 26 March 1897.

Several churches were built in the mid- to late-1890s. A Methodist Church was opened in November 1896. A Presbyterian Church was opened the following year, and an Anglican Church opened in 1898. Around 1900, a Church of Christ building opened.

Sports clubs were formed as well. Subiaco Football Club and Subiaco Cricket Club formed in 1897. The council leased 4 acres (1.6 ha) of land near Townshend Road and Railway Road for sports use. At first, the land was not suitable for this use, so these clubs used Dyson's Swamp in Shenton Park until 1908. The original land was vested in the Municipality of Subiaco in 1904, and named Mueller Park, after German-Australian botanist Ferdinand von Mueller, in 1906. It was then made into a suitable ground for sports, with the Subiaco Football Club playing their first match there in May 1908. By the end of 1909, there was a grandstand at the oval, which was named Subiaco Oval. Further facilities came after, including grounds for tennis, croquet and lawn bowls. Mueller Park was renamed to Kitchener Park in 1916, due to anti-German sentiment.

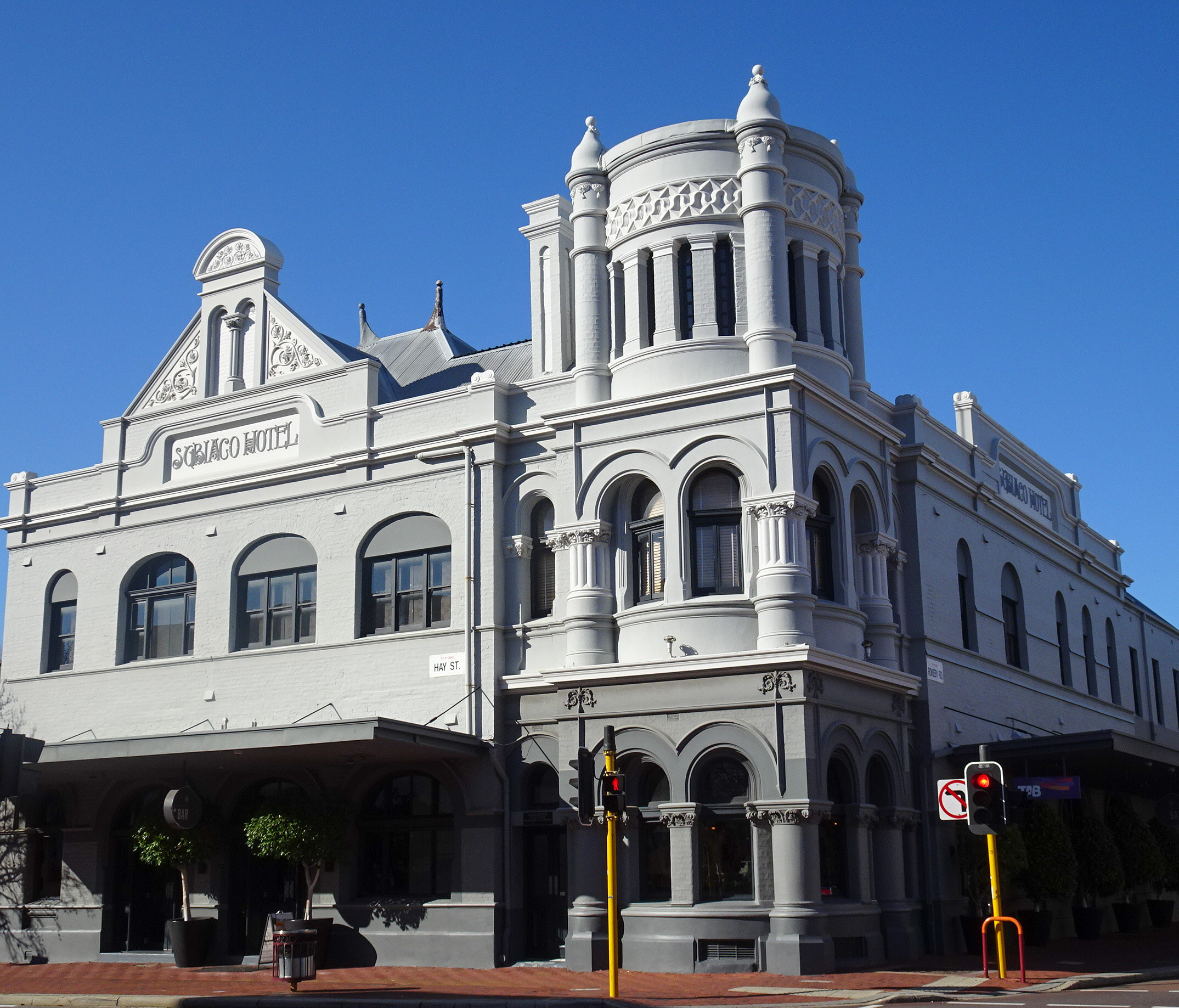
Subiaco Hotel in 2019

Around 1897, Subiaco railway station was relocated from Salvado Road to the northern end of Rokeby Road, further entrenching that road as Subiaco's main street. Around 1898, the Subiaco Hotel was constructed, and in 1899, a permanent building for the Municipality of Subiaco council was constructed, on a site next to the primary school. In 1901, a fire station on the same block was completed. This cluster of facilities led to the block being named Civic Square. The Subiaco council moved to a newer and larger building, still in Civic Square, in 1909.

Around 1905, the Municipality was given 98 acres (40 ha) of endowment land to use, located north of the railway line and south of Salvado Road. The council held a competition for the design of a subdivision on the land. Architect George Temple Poole won the competition. The land then became an industrial area. The land was first leased in 1905, and factories were subsequently built on the land, including a timber and construction materials factory, and a foundry and ironworks.

By 1906, 4500 street trees had been planted by the municipality, establishing Subiaco as one of Perth's leafiest suburbs. This was initiated by inaugural Town Clerk and Engineer Alexander Rankin. Ken Spillman wrote in his book that Rankin has a "near obsession with beautifying the municipality".

In 1909, the first stage of a new children's hospital opened, on Thomas Street, at the eastern end of Subiaco. This hospital was named Princess Margaret Hospital for Children in 1949. Following the opening of the children's hospital, women's organisations began to lobby for a public maternity hospital to be constructed in Perth. As a result, the King Edward Memorial Hospital for Women opened in 1916, at the western end of Subiaco.

In 1911, Perth Modern School opened, as the state's first government funded high school. Demand for spots at the school was so great that prospective students had to pass an examination to get in. This practice continued, even after other schools opened in Perth, until it became a comprehensive school in 1959.

On 9 January 1912, the Workers' Home Board Act passed the Parliament of Western Australia, causing the formation of the Workers' Homes Board, which was the state's first public housing organisation. The government bought land in Subiaco to use as public housing. At a ceremony on 29 August 1912, John Scaddan, the Premier of Western Australia, placed the first brick to be laid by the Workers' Homes Board, at a construction site on Hensman Road, Subiaco.

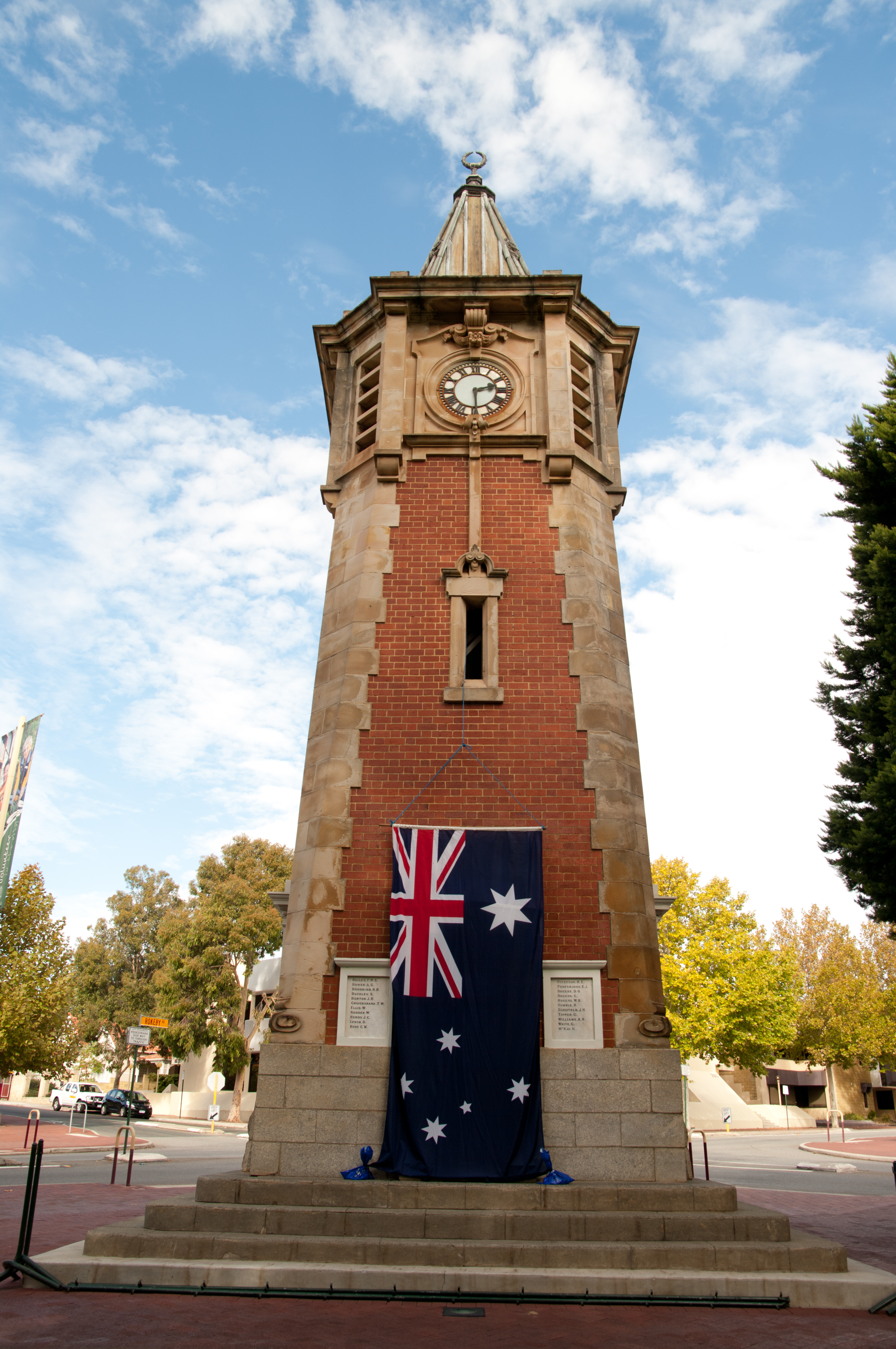
Subiaco War Memorial on Anzac Day 2012

Following World War I, population growth in Subiaco slowed. Residents and the Subiaco Council entered into financial hardship. The major growth that occurred in Subiaco in the 1920s was the industrial area. In November 1922, the council began construction on a World War I memorial clock tower. Despite initially being conceived as mostly community funded, the Subiaco council funded the majority of the memorial, after fundraising efforts did poorly. It officially opened on 25 November 1923. This decade also saw the return to the council's focus on beautification. A council nursery was established at Kitchener Park in 1921.

In 1924, Daglish railway station opened on the south-western edge of Subiaco. It was named after the former Mayor of Subiaco, Premier of Western Australia, and member for Subiaco, Henry Daglish.

In 1927, the Subiaco post office relocated from Civic Square to a larger building on the corner of Rokeby Road and Park Street. This led to the council establishing a library in the old post office.

In 1936, Subiaco Oval became the headquarters of the Western Australian Football League (WAFL), of which the Subiaco Football Club is a part, and more grandstands were constructed. That same year, the WAFL Grand Final was played at Subiaco Oval for the first time. Subiaco became the home of Australian rules football in Western Australia.

=== Post World War II ===
By the late 1940s, the Municipality of Subiaco had reached a high enough population that it was eligible to become a city. Under the Municipal Corporations Act 1906, a municipality can become a city if its population is greater than 20,000, and its annual revenue is greater than £20,000. The municipality's population in 1952 was 20,100. Thus, on 8 February 1952, the City of Subiaco was gazetted. In celebration of becoming a city, a parade was staged along Hay Street and Rokeby Road on 20 September 1952. It started at Kitchener Park, and ending at the corner of Rokeby and Heytesbury roads. Thousands of people from Subiaco and across Perth attended; Mayor Joseph Abrahams said that it was "the greatest assembly of citizens Subiaco has seen".

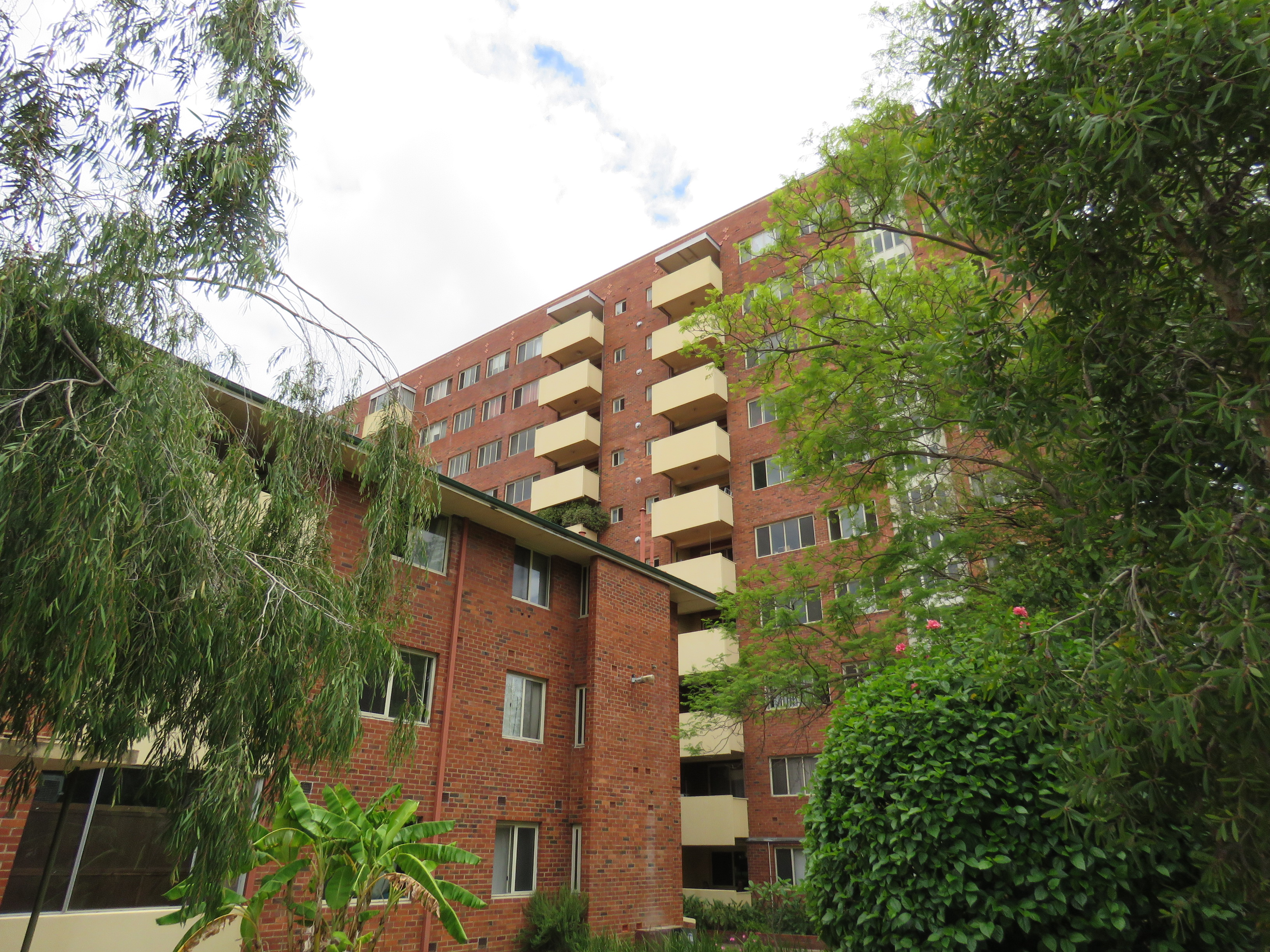
Wandana State Housing Complex

By the late 1940s, many of Subiaco's older buildings were rundown and needing significant repairs, giving the suburb a bad image. The newer, nearby suburbs of Daglish and parts of Shenton Park were mostly owner-occupied, compared to Subiaco, where most properties were rentals. The council encouraged renovations, but this had little effect. Across the 1950s and 1960s, demolition of older homes was common in Subiaco. The benefits of demolition were seen as better than renovating. In the mid 1950s, the Wandana State Housing Complex was built in Subiaco. The 10 storey building was the first high rise state housing block in Perth, and one of the first in Australia. The construction of other apartment blocks followed.

The 1950s also brought about an increase in commercial activity in Subiaco. New businesses were built, particularly along Hay Street and Rokeby Road. New commercial buildings were functional in design, with little detailing, which contrasted with older buildings. Mayor Joseph Abrahams said in 1954 that "within the period of one year the appearance of both Hay Street and Rokeby Road has altered considerably". Due to the increasing use of cars, tramways closed across Perth in the 1950s. The last tram through Subiaco was on 19 April 1958. A lack of car parking in Subiaco's commercial areas became a problem. In the early 1960s, the council purchased a property in the town centre to provide parking. This opened in April 1962. Two more car parks were built over the following years.

Modernisation upgrades occurred during the 1950s, 1960s and 1970s. Roads, footpaths, parks and sporting grounds were improved. A new council building opened in 1968. The original, 1899 council building was demolished. In 1971, a new library was opened.

The need to preserve historic structures was recognised more in the 1970s. The Subiaco Historical Society was formed in 1973. The society opened a museum at Civic Square in 1975. The council put in place policies to preserve heritage in Subiaco. More and more people saw the renovation of old buildings as an option, and developments grew more sympathetic to existing structures. This continued across the following decades.

In 1979, the Perth to Fremantle railway line closed, drawing protest. The council and residents celebrated when it was reinstated in 1983. In 1981, part of Kitchener Park was renamed back to Mueller Park.

=== Redevelopment ===
Increasing land values across the second half of the 20th century for inner city areas of Perth and the acquisition of smaller businesses by large companies saw the rise of the large, outer suburban industrial areas of Kwinana and Welshpool, at the expense of Subiaco's industrial area. Across the 1970s and 1980s, much land in this area was vacated. The City of Subiaco and the State Government saw an opportunity to redevelop this land into an urban village. The Subiaco Redevelopment Act 1994 was passed by parliament, forming the Subiaco Redevelopment Authority. The project was called "Subi Centro" As part of the redevelopment, the Fremantle line was put in a cut-and-cover tunnel for 800 m (2,600 ft), and a new underground Subiaco station was built. This also opened up 80 ha (200 acres) of land for the redevelopment project. A town square around the station was built, named Subiaco Square. The square and the station opened in December 1998. As of 2014, 86% of the redevelopment has been completed. The state government later dissolved the Subiaco Redevelopment Authority, handing back planning control to the City of Subiaco.

In October 2020, the state government finalised the "Subi East" redevelopment plan, to follow the demolition of the Subiaco Oval stadium and Princess Margaret Hospital after their closures in 2017 and 2018 respectively. The plan will see the creation of a new residential urban village in the north-east of the suburb.

== Demographics ==
Subiaco had a population of 9,940 at the 2021 Australian census. This is an increase on the 9,202 recorded at the 2016 Australian census, the 8,015 recorded at the 2011 census, the 7,629 recorded at the 2006 census, and the 7,127 recorded at the 2001 census. 47.8% of residents were male, and 52.2% of residents were female. The median age was 40, above the state and national median of 38.

At the 2016 census, 56.5% of Subiaco households were families, below the state average of 71.2%; 39.0% were single person households, compared to the state average of 25.4%; and 4.5% were group households, compared to the state average of 3.4%. Of those family households, 49.5% were couples without children, 36.6% were couples with children, 12.0% were single parents with children, and 1.6% were some other type of family. The state averages were 38.8%, 44.6%, 15.1% and 1.6% respectively. The average number of people per household was 2.1, compared to the state average of 2.5.

Of the suburb's 5,333 dwellings, 4,482 were occupied at the 2021 census and 610 were unoccupied. Out of the 4,482 occupied dwellings, 38.8% were detached, far lower than the state average of 79.7%; 19.3% were semi detached, higher than the state average of 13.0%; 41.7% were a flat or apartment, far higher than the state average of 6.5%; and 0.1% were of some other type of dwelling. The average number of bedrooms per dwelling was 2.4, which is lower than the state average of 3.3. 28.7% were owned outright, close to the state average of 29.2%; 24.1% were owned with a mortgage, below the state average of 40.0%; 45.0% were rented, above the state average of 27.3%; and 1.9% were some other tenure type or not stated, compared to the state average of 3.5%.

At the 2016 census, the median weekly personal income was $1,330, compared to the state average of $848 and national average of $805; the median weekly family income was $3,315, compared to the state average of $2,214 and national average of $2,120; and the median weekly household income was $2,219, compared to the state average of $1,815 and the national average of $1,746. Professionals and managers were the most common professions for those employed living in Subiaco, at 48.4% and 16.1% of residents respectively. Clerical and administrative workers were 10.2% of those employed, community and personal service workers were 7.6%, and sales workers were 5.7%. Blue collar jobs were low, with technicians and trades workers at 5.8%, labourers at 3.5%, and machinery operators and drivers at 1.4%. The most common industries of employment were hospitals (except psychiatric hospitals) (8.8%), legal services (3.4%), higher education (3.1%), cafes and restaurants (2.6%), and iron ore mining (2.4%). 56.2% of residents aged 15 years or older had a bachelors degree or above, significantly higher than the state average of 23.8%.

The most common ancestries that people identified with at the 2016 census were English (38.2%), Australian (24.3%), Irish (13.3%), Scottish (10.7%), and Chinese (7.2%). 57.7% of residents were born in the country, slightly below the state average of 62.0%. The next most common birthplaces were England (8.1%), Malaysia (2.0%), New Zealand (1.8%), Ireland (1.7%), and South Africa (1.7%). 45.0% of residents had both parents born outside Australia and 34.1% had both parents born in Australia. The most common religious affiliations were no religion (47.5%), Catholic (18.0%), Anglican (10.4%), and Buddhism (2.4%). 7.1% of residents did not state their religion.

== Landmarks ==
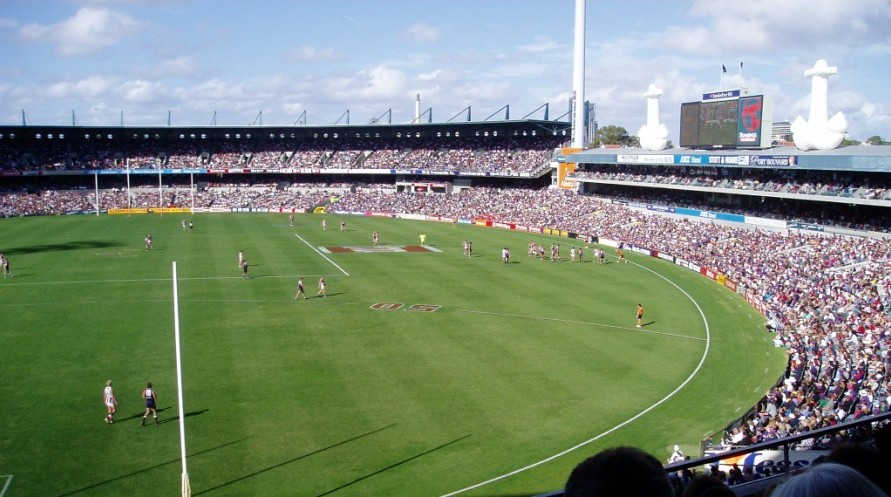
Subiaco Oval

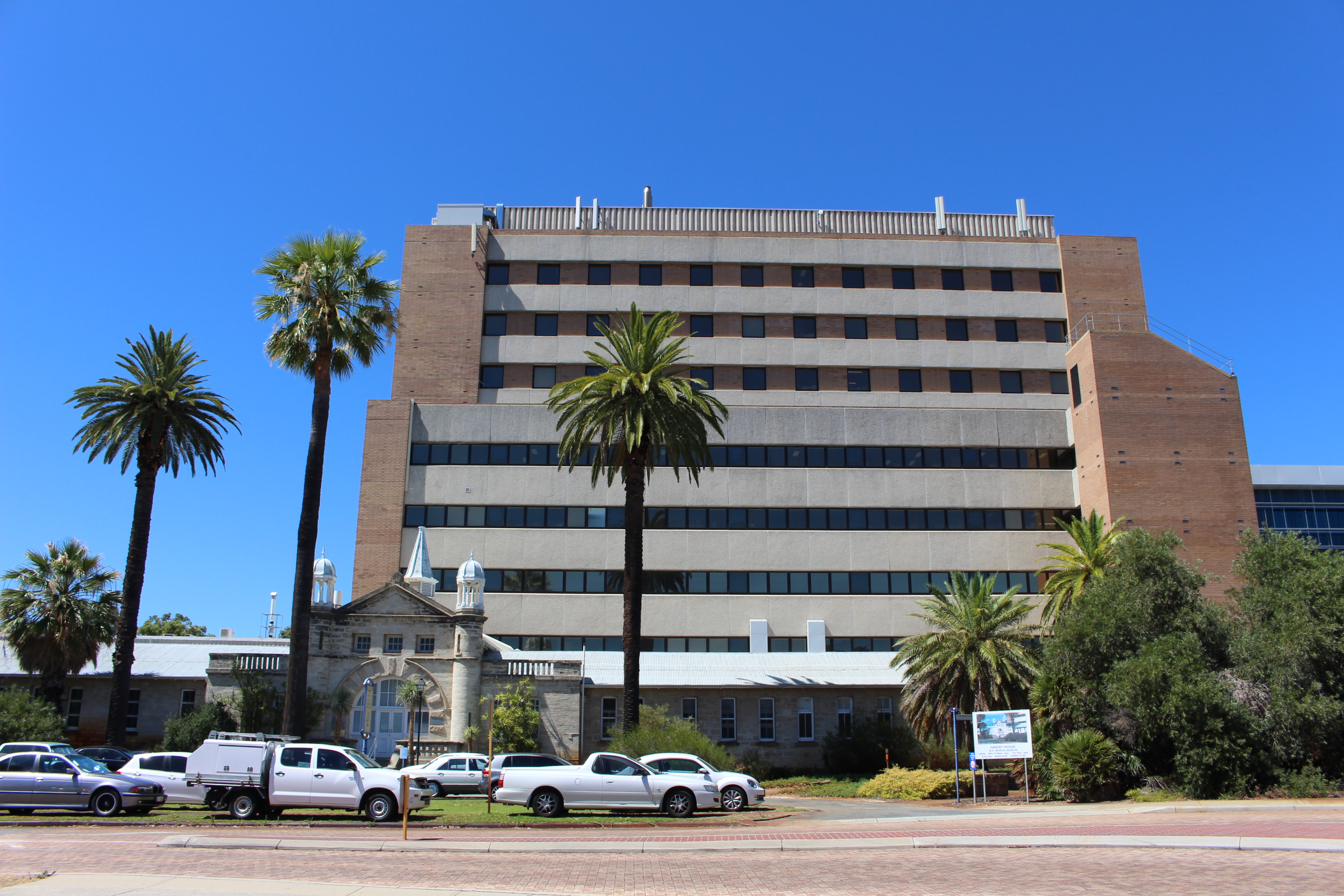
King Edward Memorial Hospital for Women

Landmarks of suburb include Subiaco Oval, Mueller Park, the Regal Theatre, the Subiaco Hotel, the Victorian terraces on Catherine Street and the Subiaco Arts Centre.

The main street of Subiaco is Rokeby Road, which was named after General Henry Montagu, 6th Baron Rokeby, who was commander of the 1st Division during the Crimean War. Another important commercial road is Hay Street.

Residential areas include Subi Centro, a modern housing development with the sunken Subiaco railway station on reclaimed industrial land near Wembley, and older heritage properties towards Shenton Park.

Major hospital facilities include St John of God Subiaco Hospital and King Edward Memorial Hospital for Women.

On the corner of Rokeby and Hamersley Roads is a clock tower war memorial, built in 1923 to commemorate soldiers from the district who died in World War I. The names of those who died in later conflicts have also been added.

== Architecture ==
Subiaco has a large number of well-preserved high-quality historic homes, many with elaborate leadlight windows. Many houses in Subiaco are heritage listed, which recognises their cultural significance and ensures that any changes preserve their unique characteristics. The City of Subiaco publishes a self-guide walking tour of some of them. From 1989 until 2006 a Festival of Leadlights community event was run biennially. It was restarted in 2018.

== Culture ==
Each year, the City of Subiaco supports a boutique street festival where Rokeby Road is closed off from traffic between Barker Road and Hay Street. It is commonly referred to as the "Subiaco Street Party" and is a free community event that promotes live music, street food, markets and family entertainment.

Subiaco—along with Northbridge, Leederville and Fremantle—is one of Perth's major nightlife hubs. It attracts people from all over the metropolitan region for its pubs, bars and nightclubs. Subiaco's bars and restaurants are clustered around Rokeby Road and Hay Street. Subiaco encompasses small businesses, commercial retail chains, and franchise businesses. Notable business that have operated in Subiaco for over 30 years include the Subiaco Hotel, Farmer Jack Food Market, Coles Supermarkets, the Victoria Hotel and the Regal Theatre. The Crossways shopping precinct on Rokeby Road was constructed in 1954.

Subiaco is also known for its Subi Farmer's Market, held every Saturday morning near the primary school on Bagot Road. It is used by locals and other shoppers, with fresh and organic produce and a lively market atmosphere.

== Education ==
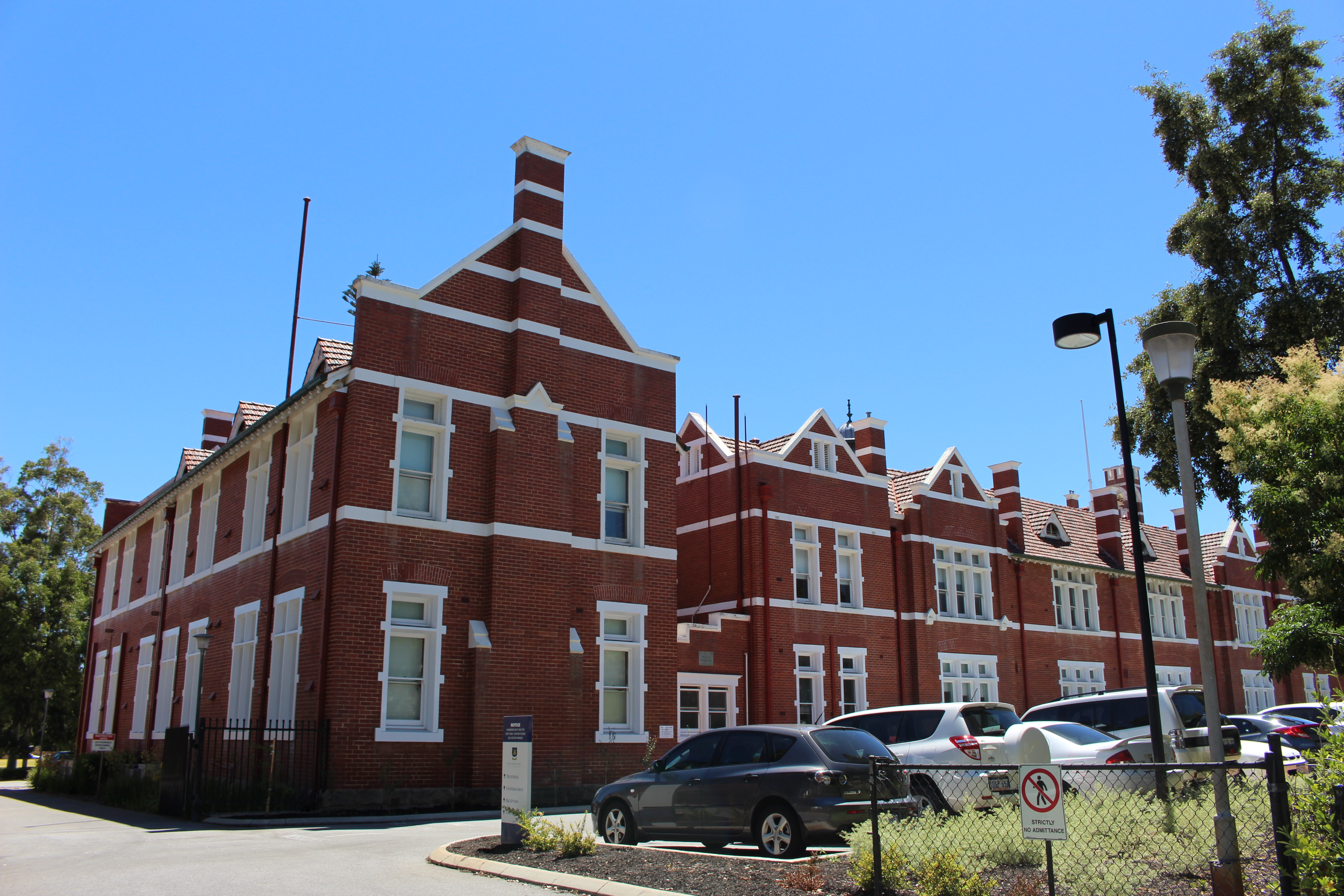
Perth Modern School in 2015

Subiaco has three schools: Subiaco Primary School, Perth Modern School, which is the state's only fully academically selective public school, and Bob Hawke College.

== Governance ==
=== Local ===
Subiaco is mostly in the City of Subiaco local government area. The suburb takes up almost half of the City, with the other suburbs being Daglish, Jolimont and Shenton Park. The suburb of Subiaco takes up the entirety of the City's Central and East wards, and part of the City's North Ward. The Mayor of Subiaco is David McMullen.

A small portion of Subiaco, covering the St John of God Subiaco Hospital in the north of the suburb, is within the Town of Cambridge. This area does not have any residents.

=== State ===
As of the 2021 Western Australian state election, for the Western Australian Legislative Assembly (lower house), Subiaco is part of the electoral district of Nedlands. This seat is part of the North Metropolitan Region of the Western Australian Legislative Council (upper house). The current member for Nedlands is Katrina Stratton, of the Australian Labor Party, the main centre-left party in Australia. Prior to the 2021 election, the Liberal Party of Australia, the main centre-right party, had held the seat every year since 1950.

2021 state election Source: WAEC
Labor	38.1%
Liberal	29.3%
Greens	17.9%
Independent	7.4%
NMV	2.5%

2017 state election Source: WAEC
Liberal	44.2%
Labor	29.0%
Greens	16.1%
Matheson for WA	3.9%
Christians	1.9%

2013 state election Source: WAEC
Liberal	49.7%
Labor	17.4%
Greens	14.5%
Independent	12.7%
Christians	1.0%

2008 state election Source: WAEC
Liberal	40.5%
Independent	20.7%
Labor	19.2%
Greens	14.3%
CDP	1.0%

=== Federal ===
Subiaco is within the division of Curtin for the Australian House of Representatives. The member for Curtin is the Liberal Party's Celia Hammond.

2019 federal election Source: AEC
Liberal	54.4%
Labor	17.3%
Greens	14.3%
Independent	9.4%
Western Australia	1.7%

2016 federal election Source: AEC
Liberal	66.6%
Greens	15.2%
Labor	14.2%
Independent	2.2%
Liberty Alliance	1.8%

2013 federal election Source: AEC
Liberal	63.0%
Labor	17.3%
Greens	15.9%
Palmer United	2.1%
Christians	1.0%

2010 federal election Source: AEC
Liberal	56.5%
Greens	21.6%
Labor	20.6%
CDP	1.3%

== Transport ==
At the 2016 census, 48.7% of Subiaco residents travelled to work in a car, compared to the state average of 70.4%; 18.7% travelled to work on public transport, compared to the state average of 18.7%; and 11.1% walked to work, compared to the state average of 2.8%.

=== Road ===
Along the south eastern border of Subiaco is Thomas Street, which is a six-lane dual carriageway. To the south, Thomas Street leads to the Queen Elizabeth II Medical Centre (QEII Medical Centre), the University of Western Australia (UWA), and Stirling Highway. To the north, this continues as Loftus Street, which has an interchange with the Mitchell Freeway. Along the western edge is Railway Road, which travels along the southern side of the railway, leading to Claremont. This road is a four-land single carriageway.

East–west through Subiaco, Roberts Road and Hay Street form a pair of one way roads travelling opposite directions. To the east of Subiaco, they lead to the Perth CBD. To the west, Roberts Road intersects with Hay Street, which becomes a two way road. Continuing west on Hay Street leads to Floreat, City Beach and West Coast Highway. On the northern edge, there is Salvado Road and Railway Parade, the latter of which travels along the northern side of the railway line. Railway Parade continues east of Thomas Street as Roe Street, which leads to the Perth CBD and Northbridge. Bagot Road continues east of Thomas Street as Kings Park Road, which also leads to the Perth CBD. On the southern edge, there is Nicholson Road, which bridges across the railway line.

North–south through Subiaco, Rokeby Road is a main road. This links between Thomas Street to the south, to Roberts Road to the north. The other north–south main road is Haydn Bunton Drive and Townshend Road. The former road is named after former Subiaco Football Club players Haydn Bunton Sr. and Haydn Bunton Jr., and passes on the west side of Subiaco Oval and over the railway line to Railway Parade.

=== Public transport ===
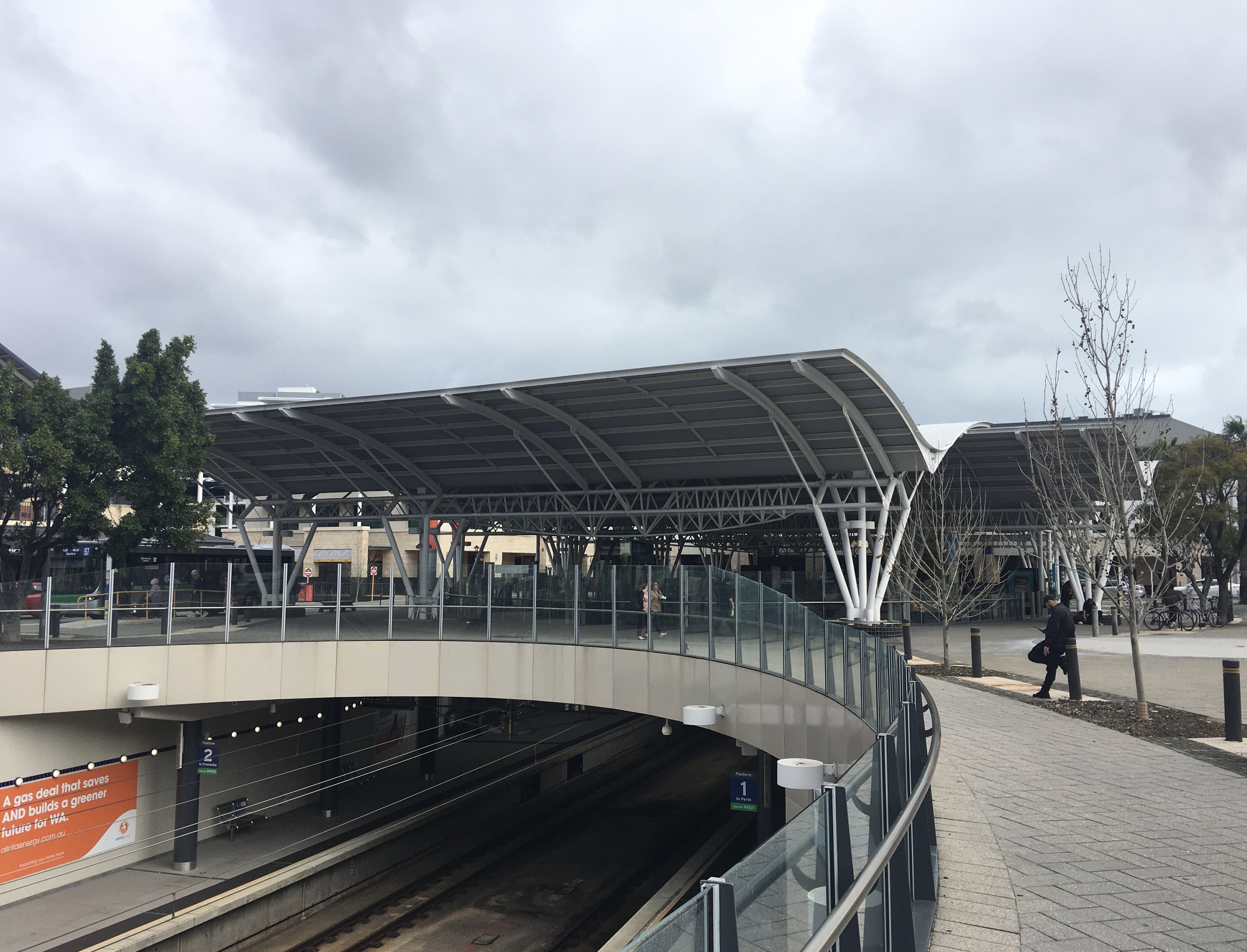
Subiaco station in August 2021

Public transport in Perth is all under the Transperth brand. Train services are operated by Transperth Train Operations, a division of the Public Transport Authority. Bus services in Perth are contracted out to private companies. Subiaco is in the Claremont contract area, which is being operated by Swan Transit.

Subiaco is served by three stations along the Fremantle line. From east to west, they are West Leederville railway station, Subiaco railway station, and Daglish railway station. West Leederville station is the closest station to Subiaco Oval, so special event services served that station before and after stadium events. That station had a third platform added in, for express services to other railway lines. West Leederville station is along Subiaco's border with West Leederville. It had 223,313 passengers board in the 2013-14 financial year. Subiaco station is at the centre of Subiaco Square, and is the third busiest station along the Fremantle line, after Perth railway station and Fremantle railway station. It had 975,390 passengers board in the 2013-14 financial year. Subiaco station has several bus routes linking to it. Daglish station is along Subiaco's border with Daglish. It had 186,725 passengers board in the 2013-14 financial year.

Most bus services in Subiaco go roughly east–west, linking between the Perth CBD and suburbs further west or south-west of Subiaco. Others link to stations on the Yanchep line, to UWA or to the QEII Medical Centre. Along Cambridge Street is routes 81, 82, 83, 84 and 85, which all begin at Perth Busport. Routes 81, 82, 83 and 84 link to various coastal suburbs such as City Beach and Wembley Downs. Route 85 links to Glendalough railway station on the Yanchep line. Along Hay Street and Roberts Road is route 28, which goes between Perth Busport and Claremont railway station on the Fremantle line. Along Bagot Road is route 27, which goes between East Perth and Claremont station. Through streets in the southern part of Subiaco is route 25 and 24. Route 25 goes between Elizabeth Quay Bus Station and Claremont station, via Nedlands. Route 24 goes between East Perth and Claremont station via Dalkeith. Along Thomas Street is routes 26, 96 and 103. Route 26 goes between East Perth and the QEII Medical Centre. Route 96 goes between Leederville railway station on the Yanchep line and UWA. Route 103 goes between East Perth and Fremantle railway station, via the QEII Medical Centre. Route 97 is the only route that terminates at Subiaco station. Its path goes down Rokeby Road and Nicholson Road to UWA.

== See also ==
- Chesters' Subdivision Conservation Area, Subiaco
