= Princess Margaret Hospital for Children =

Former children's hospital in Perth, Western Australia

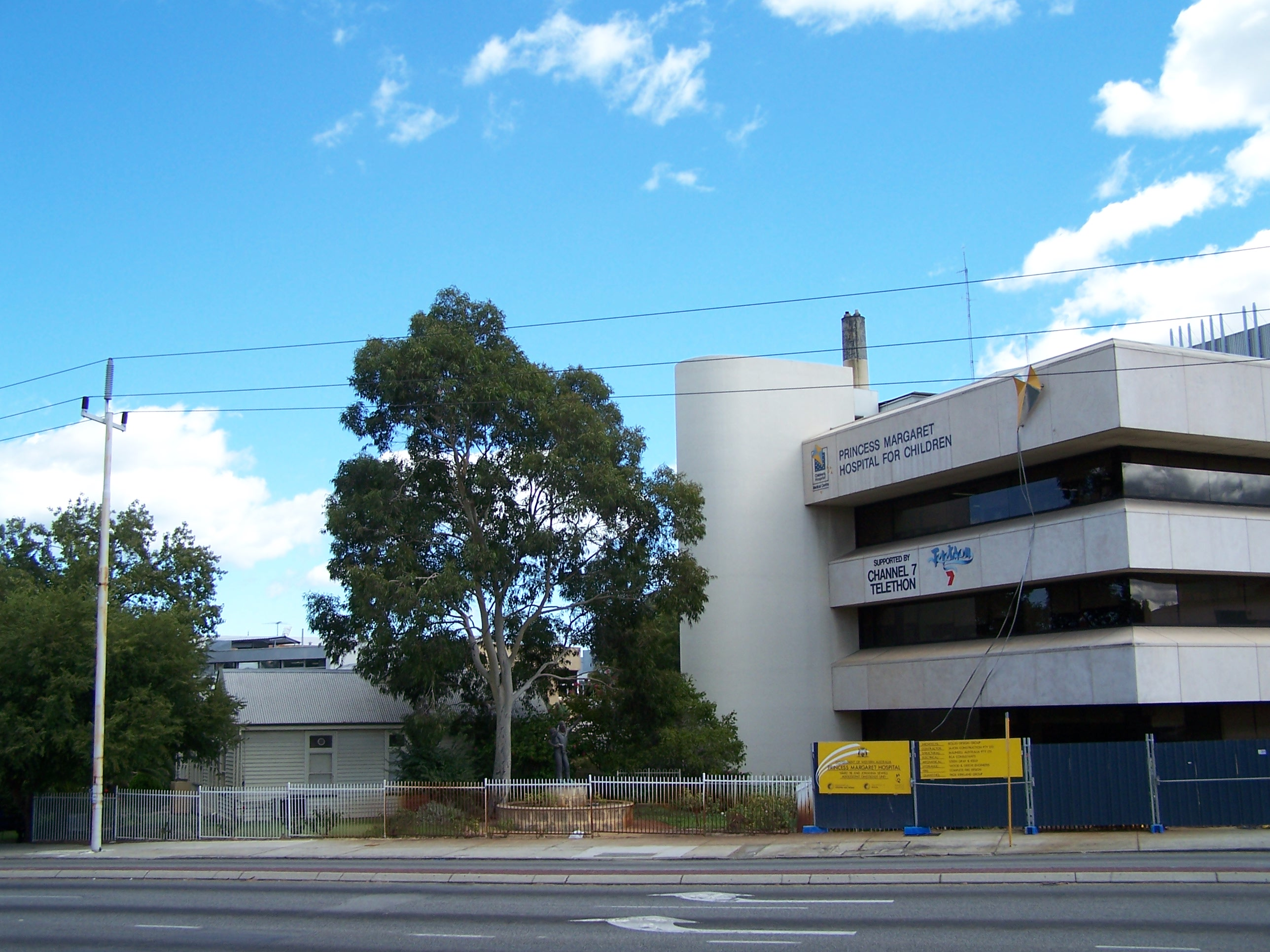
- The Old Outpatients (left) and Charles Moore (right) buildings of PMH, as seen from near the corner of Hay and Thomas streets in April 2006. The Charles Moore Building was demolished in 2021.

Geography
- Location: Subiaco, City of Subiaco, Western Australia, Australia
- Coordinates: 31°56′46″S 115°50′13″E

Organisation
- Care system: Public Medicare (AU)
- Type: Specialist

Services
- Emergency department: Yes
- Beds: 220
- Speciality: Paediatric hospital

History
- Founded: 1909; 117 years ago
- Closed: 10 June 2018; 8 years ago

Links
- Lists: Hospitals in Australia

Princess Margaret Hospital for Children (PMH) was a children's hospital and centre for paediatric research and care located in Perth, Western Australia. It was the state's only specialist children's hospital until it closed in 2018, coinciding with the opening of the new Perth Children's Hospital that was built to replace it. Together with the Child and Adolescent Community Health Division, it made up the Child and Adolescent Health Service.

Formerly located on Roberts Road in Subiaco, Western Australia, the hospital had approximately 220 beds and served 300,000 patients per year.

== History ==
PMH originated as the Perth Children's Hospital in 1909 after 12 years of community fundraising. The original facilities included 40 beds, an operating theatre and outpatient department. The name Princess Margaret Hospital for Children was adopted in 1949, in honour of Princess Margaret, sister of Queen Elizabeth II.

In 1994 the organisational structure for the Princess Margaret Hospital for Children and King Edward Memorial Hospital's merged (but not their locations). In 2002 that organisation was renamed Women's and Children's Health Service. In 2006, the two hospitals were once again separated.

In 2008, the state government announced that a new children's hospital would be built to replace Princess Margaret Hospital for Children. Following the completion of the new Perth Children's Hospital in May 2018, and the opening of its emergency department, Princess Margaret Hospital closed on 10 June 2018, and all patients were transferred to the new hospital.

In March 2021 major demolition works began at the former hospital site; however two heritage-listed buildings, Godfrey House and the Old Outpatients Building were preserved as well as the hospital's boiler house and chimney stack. The demolition works were completed in October 2022. The cleared site then became part of the ongoing Subi East redevelopment; in June 2026, a public space featuring a playground and a memorial garden opened on the former hospital site.

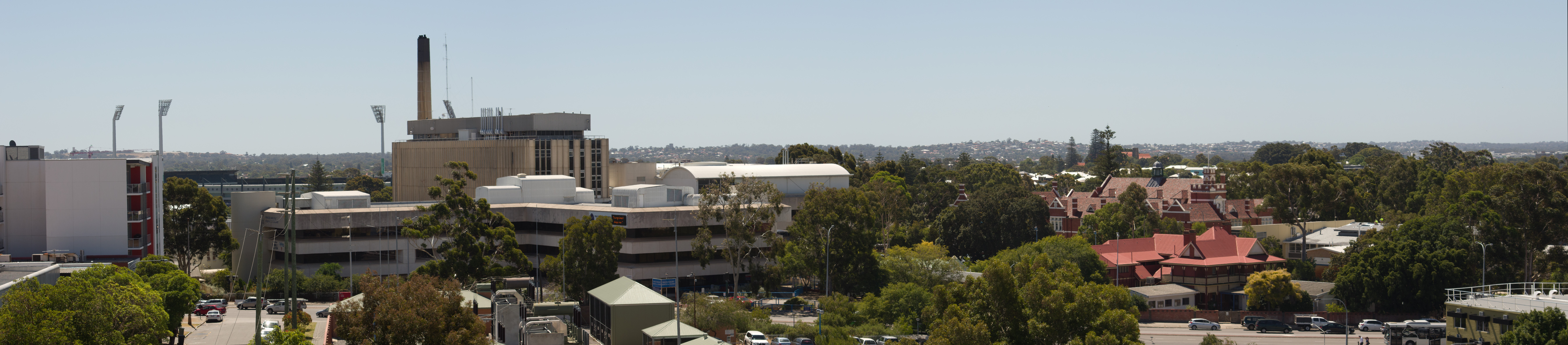
Princess Margaret Hospital viewed from the east in December 2014

== See also ==
- List of hospitals in Western Australia
- Health care in Australia
