= King Edward Memorial Hospital for Women =

Hospital in Perth, Western Australia

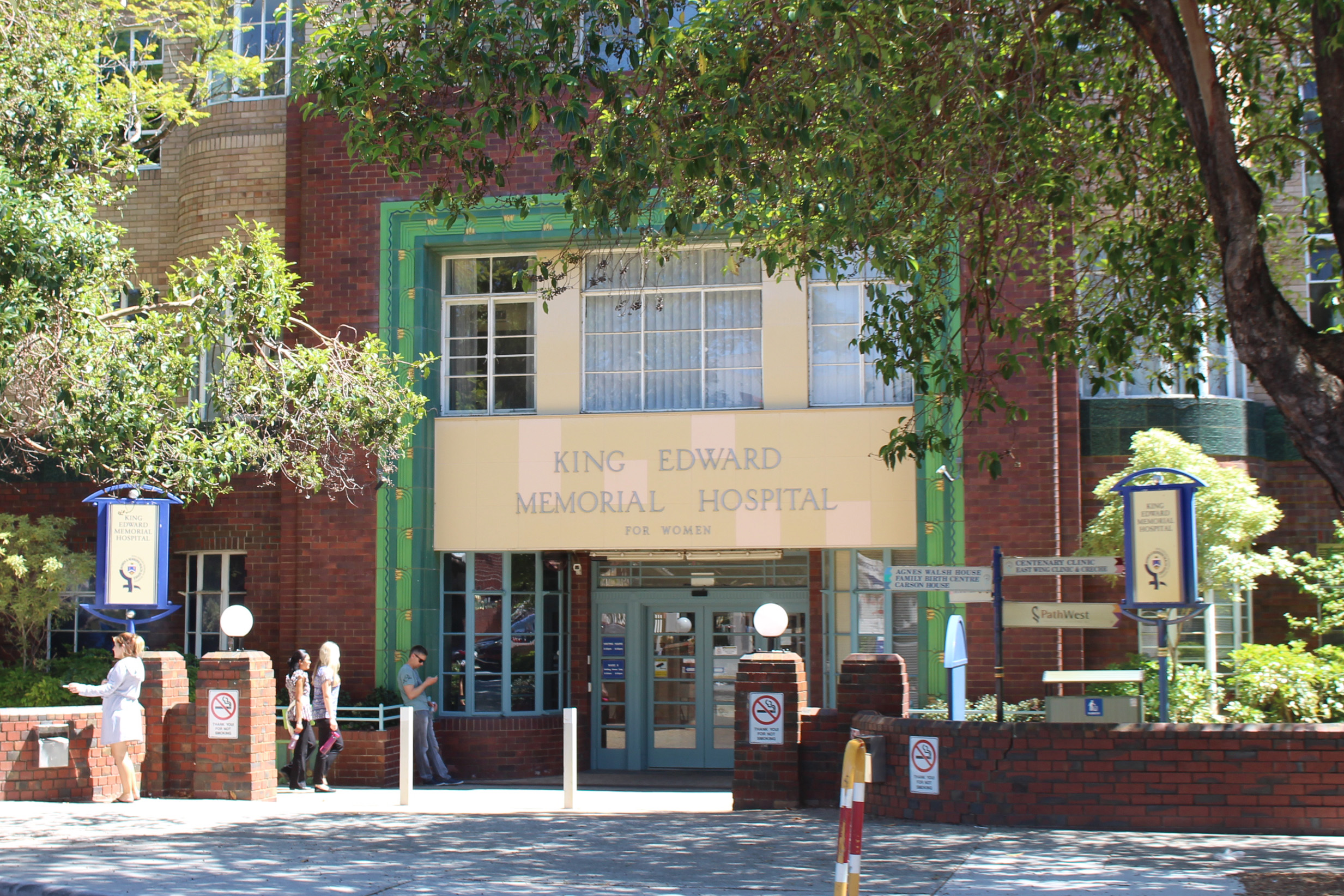
- Main entrance

Geography
- Location: 374 Bagot Road, Subiaco, City of Subiaco, Western Australia, Australia
- Coordinates: 31°57′01″S 115°49′07″E

Organisation
- Type: Specialist, Teaching

Services
- Emergency department: Yes

Helipads
- Helipad: No

History
- Founded: 14 July 1916; 110 years ago

Links
- Website: Official website
- Lists: Hospitals in Australia

Western Australia Heritage Register
- Type: State Registered Place
- Designated: 20 December 2002
- Reference no.: 2438

King Edward Memorial Hospital for Women (KEMH) is a hospital located in Subiaco, Western Australia. It is Western Australia's largest maternity hospital and only referral centre for complex pregnancies.

It provides pregnancy and neonatal care within the greater Perth metropolitan area. In cases where patients have gone to private maternity clinics, they may be moved to KEMH if complications occur. Cases of complicated pregnancy in regional Western Australia are usually transferred to KEMH by the Royal Flying Doctor Service.

== History ==
In 1909, a meeting was convened in Perth by the Women's Service Guilds to discuss the establishment of a new maternity hospital. At the time in Perth, there were only a few private maternity clinics, and charitable organisations providing services to the poor, but no dedicated public maternity hospital facilities. The main outcome of the 1909 meeting was to appoint a committee to pursue the matter, jointly chaired by Edith Cowan and Jane Scott. Between 1910 and 1915 the committee wrangled with the government and raised funds to support the establishment of a hospital. Plans were suggested for building an extra ward at the Perth Public Hospital, or as an adjunct to the Home of Mercy in Lincoln Street, but eventually the site of the Industrial School in Subiaco was chosen.

The hospital was named the King Edward Memorial Hospital for Women as a lasting memorial to King Edward VII, who died in 1910. The hospital commenced operating on 14 July 1916. 101 babies were born in the first 6 months of operation. At the time, the hospital charged a standard fee of £A 3 3s, equivalent to A$359.21 in 2022, for 'confinement' and fourteen days of post-natal care. Agnes Marion Walsh was head matron from 1922 until 1954 and oversaw the birth of more than 60,000 babies.

In 1994 the organisational structure for King Edward Memorial Hospital and the Princess Margaret Hospital for Children were integrated, although separate locations were maintained. In 2002 the organisation was renamed Women's and Children's Health Service. In 2006, the two hospitals were once again separated. King Edward Memorial Hospital is now home of the state's Women and Newborn Health Service, as part of the North Metropolitan Health Service.

In September 2026, the Government of Western Australia announced it would be merging King Edward Memorial Hospital with the Child and Adolescent Health Service (the Health Service Provider for Perth Children's Hospital) and the new Women and Babies Hospital into a new Health Service Provider, which is expected to launch in 2027.

== Services ==
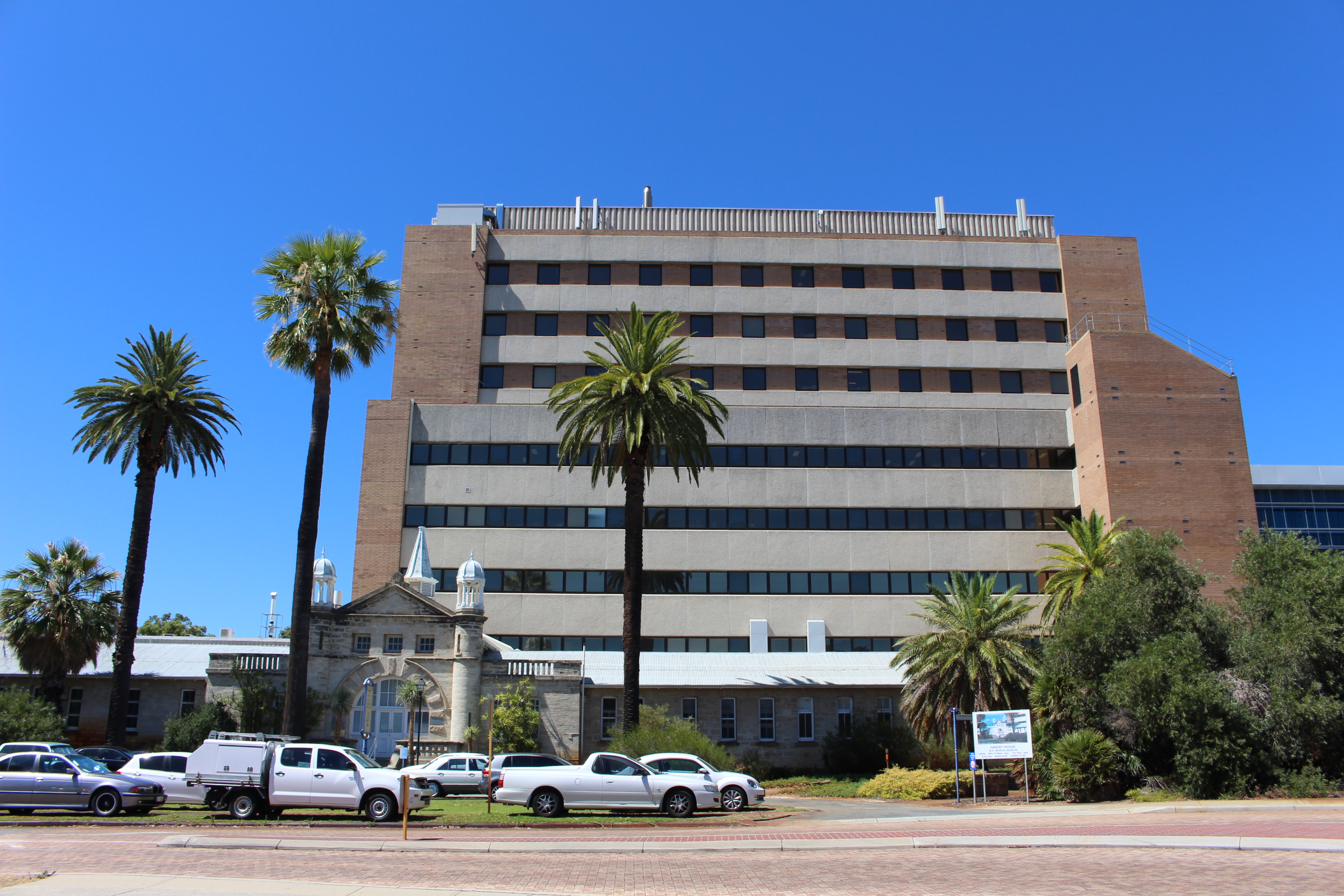
Harvey House (front) and Block B buildings

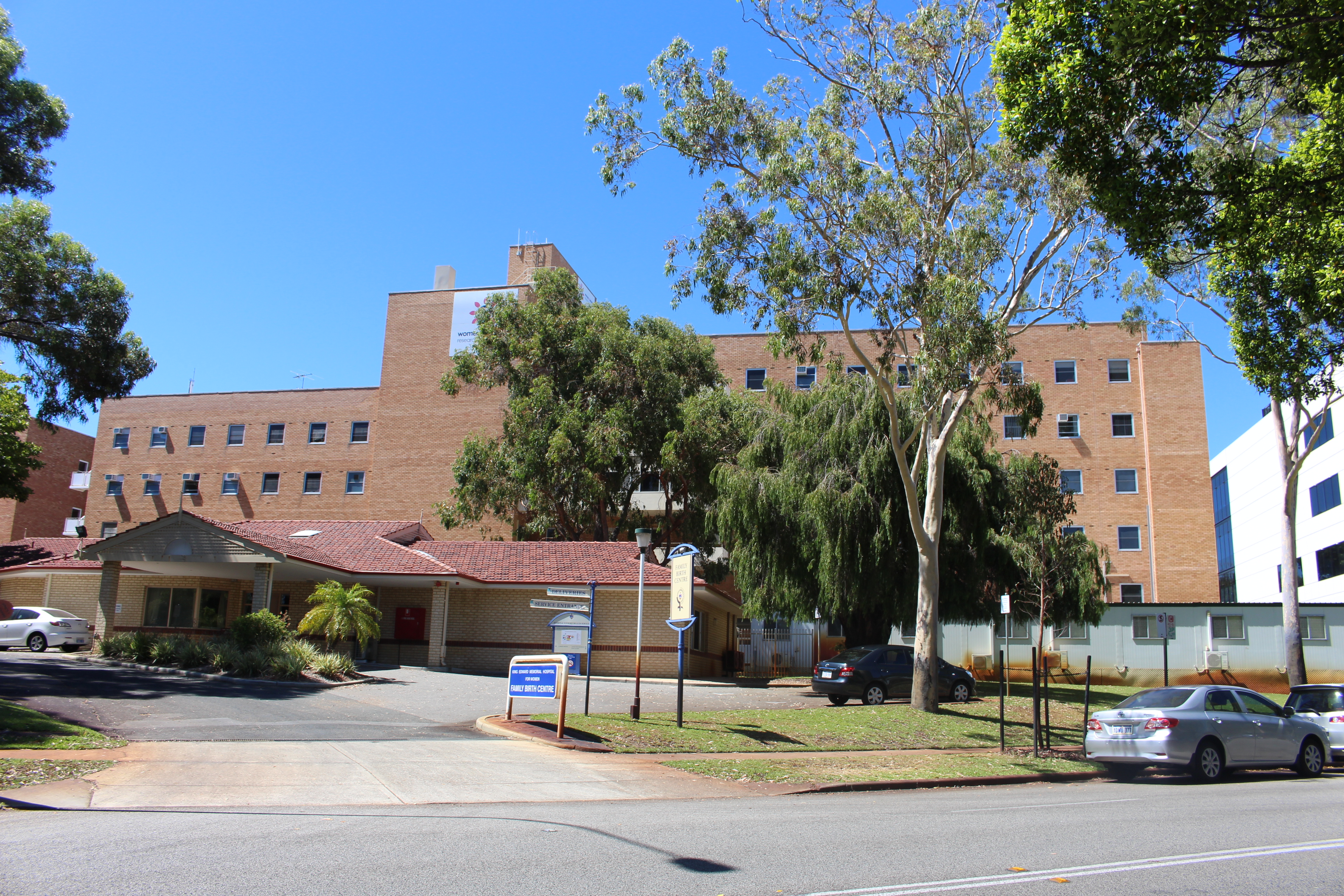
Family Birth Centre (front) and Agnes Walsh House buildings

KEMH is a tertiary maternity hospital, and provides general maternity for women in its catchment area, as well as handling complex pregnancies from across the state. KEMH has Australia's first milk bank, as well as a comprehensive inpatient service for women suffering from postnatal psychiatric disorders. KEMH also specialises in women's health, and treats over 5,000 patients with gynaecological conditions every year. KEMH is also involved in the training of student doctors and other health professionals.

In addition, KEMH hosts a number of statewide services as part of the WA Women and Newborn Health Service, including:

- BreastScreen WA – a statewide breast cancer screening program
- Genetic Services of Western Australia – providing clinical genetics and genetic counselling
- Gynaecologic Cancer Service
- Sexual Assault Resource Centre – providing a 24-hour emergency service in metropolitan Perth for people who have been recently assaulted, as well as ongoing support and counselling for victims of sexual assault and sexual abuse
- Women's Health Strategy and Programs - leading the statewide response for Family and Domestic Violence, Female Genital Cutting/Mutilation as well as other priority Women's Health issues
- WA Cervical Cancer Prevention Program
- WA Perinatal Mental Health Unit – providing information for patients and clinicians on the mental health of parents during the perinatal period

== See also ==
- List of hospitals in Western Australia
- List of hospitals in Australia
