= Electoral results for the district of Subiaco =

Western Australian district election results

This is a list of electoral results for the Electoral district of Subiaco in Western Australian state elections.

== Members for Subiaco ==
Member	Party	Term
Henry Daglish	Labour	1901–1905
Henry Daglish	Independent Labour	1905–1908
Henry Daglish	Ministerial	1908–1911
Bartholomew Stubbs	Labor	1911–1917
Samuel Brown	Nationalist	1917–1921
Walter Richardson	National Labor	1921–1925
Walter Richardson	Nationalist	1925–1933
John Moloney	Labor	1933–1936
Florence Cardell-Oliver	Nationalist	1936–1945
Florence Cardell-Oliver	Liberal	1945–1949
Florence Cardell-Oliver	Liberal Country League	1949–1956
Percival Potter	Labor	1956–1959
Hugh Guthrie	Liberal Country League	1959–1968
Hugh Guthrie	Liberal	1968–1971
Dr Tom Dadour	Liberal	1971–1984
Dr Tom Dadour	Independent	1984–1986
Dr Carmen Lawrence	Labor	1986–1989

== Election results ==
=== Elections in the 1980s ===
1986 Western Australian state election: Subiaco
Party	Candidate	Votes	%	±%
Labor	Carmen Lawrence	7,949	50.2	+1.8
Liberal	Ross McLean	7,403	46.7	−1.7
Independent	Geoff Stuart	488	3.1	+3.1
Total formal votes		15,840	97.5	−0.2
Informal votes		400	2.5	+0.2
Turnout		16,240	89.7	+4.3
Two-party-preferred result
Labor	Carmen Lawrence	8,189	51.7	+3.3
Liberal	Ross McLean	7,651	48.3	−3.3
Labor gain from Liberal		Swing	+3.3	

1983 Western Australian state election: Subiaco
Party	Candidate	Votes	%	±%
Liberal	Tom Dadour	7,108	51.6	
Labor	William Bartholomaeus	6,666	48.4	
Total formal votes		13,774	97.7	
Informal votes		322	2.3	
Turnout		14,096	85.4	
Liberal hold		Swing		

1980 Western Australian state election: Subiaco
Party	Candidate	Votes	%	±%
Liberal	Tom Dadour	8,175	63.9	−0.2
Labor	Marcelle Anderson	4,613	36.1	+0.2
Total formal votes		12,788	97.4	−0.3
Informal votes		341	2.6	+0.3
Turnout		13,129	83.8	−3.9
Liberal hold		Swing	−0.2	

=== Elections in the 1970s ===
1977 Western Australian state election: Subiaco
Party	Candidate	Votes	%	±%
Liberal	Tom Dadour	8,690	64.1	
Labor	Wendy Fatin	4,868	35.9	
Total formal votes		13,558	97.7	
Informal votes		315	2.3	
Turnout		13,873	87.7	
Liberal hold		Swing	+7.6	

1974 Western Australian state election: Subiaco
Party	Candidate	Votes	%	±%
Liberal	Tom Dadour	6,339	49.9	
Labor	Phillip Hall	5,241	41.3	
National Alliance	Francis Dwyer	752	5.9	
Australia	Ronald Hislop	373	2.9	
Total formal votes		12,705	95.7	
Informal votes		567	4.3	
Turnout		13,272	87.4	
Two-party-preferred result
Liberal	Tom Dadour	7,169	56.4	
Labor	Phillip Hall	5,536	43.6	
Liberal hold		Swing		

1971 Western Australian state election: Subiaco
Party	Candidate	Votes	%	±%
Liberal	Tom Dadour	5,338	46.8	−1.1
Labor	Dennis Kemp	4,595	40.3	−6.1
Democratic Labor	Francis Dwyer	1,191	10.5	+10.5
Defence of Government Schools	Patrick Holland	272	2.4	+2.4
Total formal votes		11,396	97.0	−0.6
Informal votes		355	3.0	+0.6
Turnout		11,751	87.8	−2.6
Two-party-preferred result
Liberal	Tom Dadour	6,254	54.9	+4.5
Labor	Dennis Kemp	5,142	45.1	−4.5
Liberal hold		Swing	+4.5	

=== Elections in the 1960s ===
1968 Western Australian state election: Subiaco
Party	Candidate	Votes	%	±%
Liberal and Country	Hugh Guthrie	5,316	47.9	
Labor	Ronnay Foster	5,153	46.4	
Independent	Jacqueline Lander	639	5.7	
Total formal votes		11,108	97.6	
Informal votes		276	2.4	
Turnout		11,384	90.4	
Two-party-preferred result
Liberal and Country	Hugh Guthrie	5,603	50.4	
Labor	Ronnay Foster	5,505	49.6	
Liberal and Country hold		Swing		

1965 Western Australian state election: Subiaco
Party	Candidate	Votes	%	±%
Liberal and Country	Hugh Guthrie	5,274	53.3	+5.7
Labor	Frank Baden-Powell	4,040	40.9	−2.5
Democratic Labor	John Martyr	573	5.8	−3.1
Total formal votes		9,887	97.5	−1.1
Informal votes		258	2.5	+1.1
Turnout		10,145	91.7	−0.7
Two-party-preferred result
Liberal and Country	Hugh Guthrie	5,761	58.3	+3.2
Labor	Frank Baden-Powell	4,126	41.7	−3.2
Liberal and Country hold		Swing	+3.2	

1962 Western Australian state election: Subiaco
Party	Candidate	Votes	%	±%
Liberal and Country	Hugh Guthrie	4,994	47.6	
Labor	Percival Potter	4,552	43.4	
Democratic Labor	Francis Dwyer	936	7.2	
Total formal votes		8,438	98.1	
Informal votes		165	1.9	
Turnout		8,603	92.5	
Two-party-preferred result
Liberal and Country	Hugh Guthrie	4,442	52.6	
Labor	Percival Potter	3,996	47.4	
Liberal and Country hold		Swing		

=== Elections in the 1950s ===
1959 Western Australian state election: Subiaco
Party	Candidate	Votes	%	±%
Liberal and Country	Hugh Guthrie	3,943	46.7	+18.3
Labor	Percival Potter	3,891	46.1	−1.2
Democratic Labor	Ronald Bulbeck	604	7.2	+7.2
Total formal votes		8,438	98.1	+0.8
Informal votes		165	1.9	−0.8
Turnout		8,603	92.5	+0.3
Two-party-preferred result
Liberal and Country	Hugh Guthrie	4,442	52.6	+4.3
Labor	Percival Potter	3,996	47.4	−4.3
Liberal and Country gain from Labor		Swing	+4.3	

1956 Western Australian state election: Subiaco
Party	Candidate	Votes	%	±%
Labor	Percival Potter	4,134	47.3	
Liberal and Country	Edgar Paddick	2,486	28.4	
Independent Liberal	Joseph Abrahams	1,791	20.5	
Independent Liberal	Walter Richardson	336	3.8	
Total formal votes		8,747	97.3	
Informal votes		242	2.7	
Turnout		8,989	92.2	
Two-party-preferred result
Labor	Percival Potter	4,520	51.7	
Liberal and Country	Edgar Paddick	4,227	48.3	
Labor gain from Liberal and Country		Swing		

1953 Western Australian state election: Subiaco
Party	Candidate	Votes	%	±%
Liberal and Country	Florence Cardell-Oliver	4,310	56.7	−5.5
Labor	Thomas Henley	3,293	43.3	+5.5
Total formal votes		7,603	98.4	−0.3
Informal votes		124	1.6	+0.3
Turnout		7,727	93.7	+2.1
Liberal and Country hold		Swing	−5.5	

1950 Western Australian state election: Subiaco
Party	Candidate	Votes	%	±%
Liberal and Country	Florence Cardell-Oliver	5,072	62.2	
Labor	Thomas Henley	3,081	37.8	
Total formal votes		8,153	98.7	
Informal votes		107	1.3	
Turnout		8,260	91.6	
Liberal and Country hold		Swing		

=== Elections in the 1940s ===
1947 Western Australian state election: Subiaco
Party	Candidate	Votes	%	±%
Liberal	Florence Cardell-Oliver	4,450	62.7	+4.0
Labor	Percival Potter	2,651	37.3	−4.0
Total formal votes		7,101	98.2	+0.7
Informal votes		129	1.8	−0.7
Turnout		7,230	90.6	−3.2
Liberal hold		Swing	+4.0	

1943 Western Australian state election: Subiaco
Party	Candidate	Votes	%	±%
Nationalist	Florence Cardell-Oliver	4,132	58.7	+18.5
Labor	William Lonnie	2,909	41.3	+4.4
Total formal votes		7,041	97.5	−1.5
Informal votes		183	2.5	+1.5
Turnout		7,224	93.8	−1.3
Nationalist hold		Swing	+0.7	

=== Elections in the 1930s ===
1939 Western Australian state election: Subiaco
Party	Candidate	Votes	%	±%
Nationalist	Florence Cardell-Oliver	2,963	40.2	+16.3
Labor	William Lonnie	2,714	36.9	−1.6
Ind. Nationalist	Walter Richardson	1,686	22.9	−0.2
Total formal votes		7,363	98.9	−0.3
Informal votes		80	1.1	+0.3
Turnout		7,443	95.1	+14.5
Two-party-preferred result
Nationalist	Florence Cardell-Oliver	4,272	58.0	+2.2
Labor	William Lonnie	3,091	42.0	−2.2
Nationalist hold		Swing	+2.2	

1936 Western Australian state election: Subiaco
Party	Candidate	Votes	%	±%
Labor	John Moloney	2,320	38.5	−5.1
Nationalist	Florence Cardell-Oliver	1,442	23.9	−13.3
Nationalist	Walter Richardson	1,392	23.1	+23.1
Nationalist	Harry Downe	877	14.5	+14.5
Total formal votes		6,031	99.2	+1.6
Informal votes		47	0.8	−1.6
Turnout		6,078	80.6	−12.3
Two-party-preferred result
Nationalist	Florence Cardell-Oliver	3,364	55.8	+8.3
Labor	John Moloney	2,667	44.2	−8.3
Nationalist gain from Labor		Swing	+8.3	

1933 Western Australian state election: Subiaco
Party	Candidate	Votes	%	±%
Labor	John Moloney	2,873	43.6	+2.1
Nationalist	Walter Richardson	2,453	37.2	−21.3
Independent	John Bathgate	1,269	19.2	+19.2
Total formal votes		6,595	97.6	−1.4
Informal votes		164	2.4	+1.4
Turnout		6,759	92.9	+14.4
Two-party-preferred result
Labor	John Moloney	3,463	52.5	+11.0
Nationalist	Walter Richardson	3,132	47.5	−11.0
Labor gain from Nationalist		Swing	+11.0	

1930 Western Australian state election: Subiaco
Party	Candidate	Votes	%	±%
Nationalist	Walter Richardson	3,233	58.5	
Labor	Richard Nash	2,290	41.5	
Total formal votes		5,469	99.0	
Informal votes		54	1.0	
Turnout		5,577	78.5	
Nationalist hold		Swing		

=== Elections in the 1920s ===
1927 Western Australian state election: Subiaco
Party	Candidate	Votes	%	±%
Nationalist	Walter Richardson	4,489	55.1	+11.6
Labor	John Leonard	3,653	44.9	+11.9
Total formal votes		8,142	99.0	+0.3
Informal votes		83	1.0	−0.3
Turnout		8,225	77.5	+13.7
Nationalist hold		Swing	−8.3	

1924 Western Australian state election: Subiaco
Party	Candidate	Votes	%	±%
Nationalist	Walter Richardson	2,584	43.5	+18.8
Labor	Ephraim Freedman	1,963	33.0	−1.2
Nationalist	Clifford Sadlier	1,395	23.5	+23.5
Total formal votes		5,942	98.7	+0.2
Informal votes		77	1.3	−0.2
Turnout		6,019	63.8	0.0
Two-party-preferred result
Nationalist	Walter Richardson	3,768	63.4	+63.4
Labor	Ephraim Freedman	2,174	36.6	−2.8
Nationalist gain from National Labor		Swing	N/A	

- Walter Richardson was the sitting member for Subiaco, who changed from the National Labor party to the Nationalists prior to the election.

1921 Western Australian state election: Subiaco
Party	Candidate	Votes	%	±%
National Labor	Walter Richardson	2,020	41.0	+41.0
Labor	Arthur Ramsbottom	1,686	34.2	−65.8
Nationalist	Samuel Brown	1,218	24.7	+24.7
Total formal votes		4,924	98.5	
Informal votes		73	1.5	
Turnout		4,997	63.8	
Two-party-preferred result
National Labor	Walter Richardson	2,985	60.6	+60.6
Labor	Arthur Ramsbottom	1,939	39.4	−60.6
National Labor gain from Labor		Swing	N/A	

=== Elections in the 1910s ===
1917 Subiaco state by-election
Party	Candidate	Votes	%	±%
Labor	Edwin Corboy	1,873	40.4	–59.6
Nationalist	Charles Heppingstone	770	16.6	+16.6
Nationalist	Samuel Brown	696	15.0	+15.0
Nationalist	James Guy	588	12.7	+12.7
Nationalist	Edwin Whittaker	448	9.7	+9.7
Nationalist	Thomas Treweek	150	3.2	+3.2
Nationalist	James Chesters	110	2.4	+2.4
Total formal votes		4,635	97.7	n/a
Informal votes		107	2.3	n/a
Turnout		4,742	69.6	n/a
Two-candidate-preferred result
Nationalist	Samuel Brown	2,376	51.3	n/a
Labor	Edwin Corboy	2,259	48.7	n/a
Nationalist gain from Labor		Swing	n/a	

1917 Western Australian state election: Subiaco
Party	Candidate	Votes	%	±%
Labor	Bartholomew Stubbs	unopposed		
Labor hold		Swing		

1914 Western Australian state election: Subiaco
Party	Candidate	Votes	%	±%
Labor	Bartholomew Stubbs	2,763	50.4	−0.4
Liberal	Henry Daglish	2,717	49.6	+0.4
Total formal votes		5,480	99.5	+7.5
Informal votes		29	0.5	−7.5
Turnout		5,509	63.6	−14.8
Labor hold		Swing	−0.4	

1911 Western Australian state election: Subiaco
Party	Candidate	Votes	%	±%
Labor	Bartholomew Stubbs	1,846	50.8	
Ministerialist	Henry Daglish	1,786	49.2	
Total formal votes		3,632	92.0	
Informal votes		314	8.0	
Turnout		3,946	78.4	
Labor gain from Ministerialist		Swing		

=== Elections in the 1900s ===
1908 Western Australian state election: Subiaco
Party	Candidate	Votes	%	±%
Ministerialist	Henry Daglish	2,527	61.1	+13.0
Labour	Walter Richardson	1,606	38.9	+38.9
Total formal votes		4,133	99.0	+0.2
Informal votes		41	1.0	−0.2
Turnout		4,174	80.4	+18.7
Ministerialist gain from Independent Labour		Swing	N/A	

1905 Western Australian state election: Subiaco
Party	Candidate	Votes	%	±%
Independent Labour	Henry Daglish	1,086	51.9	–28.1
Ministerialist	Samuel Brown	1,006	48.1	+48.1
Total formal votes		2,092	99.2	–0.2
Informal votes		17	0.8	+0.2
Turnout		2,109	61.7	–10.2
Independent Labour hold		Swing	N/A	

1904 Western Australian state election: Subiaco
Party	Candidate	Votes	%	±%
Labour	Henry Daglish	1,890	80.0	+30.4
Independent	William Thomas	473	20.0	+20.0
Total formal votes		2,363	99.4	+2.0
Informal votes		14	0.6	–2.0
Turnout		2,377	71.9	+15.4
Labour hold		Swing	+30.4	

1901 Western Australian state election: Subiaco
Party	Candidate	Votes	%	±%
Labour	Henry Daglish	828	49.6	+49.6
Independent	Samuel Brown	535	32.1	+32.1
Independent	John Brickhill	180	10.8	+10.8
Independent	Richard Sparrow	126	7.5	+7.5
Total formal votes		1,669	97.4	n/a
Informal votes		44	2.6	n/a
Turnout		1,713	56.5	n/a
Labour win		(new seat)		
