= Ross McLean (politician) =

Australian politician

Ross McLean AM

Member of the Australian Parliament for Perth
- In office 13 December 1975 – 5 March 1983
- Preceded by: Joe Berinson
- Succeeded by: Ric Charlesworth

Personal details
- Born: 30 June 1944 (age 82) Perth, Western Australia, Australia
- Party: Liberal Party of Australia
- Spouse: Karen Chaney
- Relations: Fred Chaney Sr. (father-in-law); Fred Chaney (brother-in-law); Michael Chaney (brother-in-law); John Chaney (brother-in-law)
- Education: University of Western Australia

Ross Malcolm McLean, AM (born 30 June 1944) is a former Liberal member of the Australian House of Representatives from 1975 to 1983, representing the Division of Perth, Western Australia.

== Early life ==
McLean was born in Perth on 30 June 1944. He attended school at Wesley College in South Perth.

He completed the degree of Bachelor of Economics (Hons.) at the University of Western Australia and worked at the university as a senior administrative assistant.

== Politics ==
McLean served as president of the Liberal Party's North Perth division from 1969 to 1972. He was elected to the party's state council in 1976 and was a delegate to federal council.

McLean was elected to the House of Representatives at the 1975 federal election, winning the seat of Perth from the incumbent Australian Labor Party (ALP) MP Joe Berinson.

McLean took a "strong public stand" in favour of accepting Vietnamese boat people into Australia, leading the League of Rights and the Immigration Control Association to publicly oppose his re-election to parliament before the 1980 federal election.

At the 1986 state election, McLean stood unsuccessfully for the seat of Subiaco against future premier Carmen Lawrence.

== Later life ==
McLean was a member of the Australian Broadcasting Corporation Board of Directors for five years from 1999. He was chair of the National Childcare Accreditation Council for four years from 1996 to 1999. He was president of the Association for the Blind of WA from 1995 to 1999. He was president of the League of Help for the Sick and Elderly of WA from 1995 to 1997. In December 2001 he resigned as chairman of the Fremantle Football Club in the wake of revelations that the club had exceeded the salary cap for the 2001 season. He was a member of the Board of the Western Australian Cricket Association from 2004 to 2012.

== Personal life ==
McLean married Karen Chaney, whose father Fred Chaney Sr., brother Fred Chaney, and niece Kate Chaney were also members of federal parliament.

== Notes ==
Parliament of Australia
Preceded by Joe Berinson	Member for Perth; 1975–1983	Succeeded by Ric Charlesworth
