= Fred Chaney =

Australian politician (born 1941)

The Honourable Fred Chaney AO
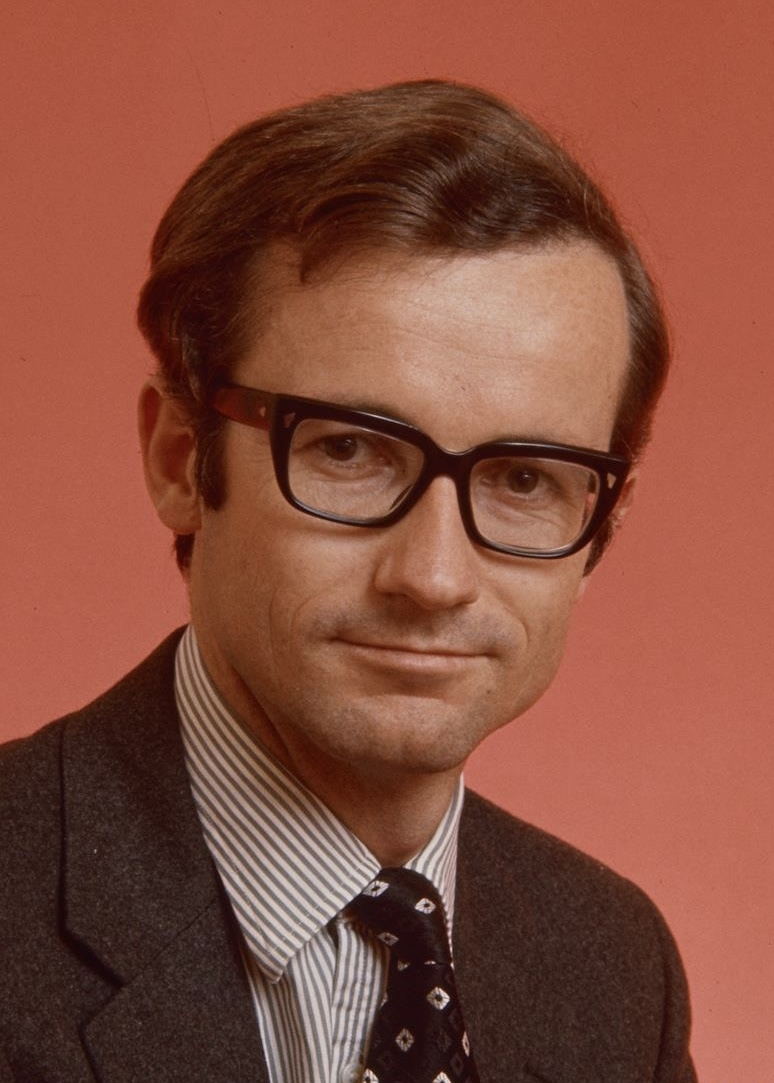
- Official portrait, 1974

Deputy Leader of the Liberal Party
- In office 9 May 1989 – 3 April 1990
- Leader: Andrew Peacock
- Preceded by: Andrew Peacock
- Succeeded by: Peter Reith

Leader of the Opposition in the Senate
- In office 11 March 1983 – 27 February 1990
- Preceded by: John Button
- Succeeded by: Robert Hill

Minister for Social Security
- In office 3 November 1980 – 11 March 1983
- Preceded by: Margaret Guilfoyle
- Succeeded by: Don Grimes

Minister for Aboriginal Affairs
- In office 5 December 1978 – 3 November 1980
- Preceded by: Ian Viner
- Succeeded by: Peter Baume

Minister for Administrative Services
- In office 25 August 1978 – 5 December 1978
- Preceded by: Peter Durack
- Succeeded by: John McLeay

Member of the Australian Parliament for Pearce
- In office 24 March 1990 – 8 February 1993
- Preceded by: New division
- Succeeded by: Judi Moylan

Senator for Western Australia
- In office 18 May 1974 – 27 February 1990
- Preceded by: Syd Negus
- Succeeded by: Ian Campbell

Personal details
- Born: 28 October 1941 (age 84) Perth, Western Australia
- Party: Liberal (to 1995)
- Spouse: Angela Clifton
- Relations: Fred Chaney Sr. (father); Michael Chaney (brother); John Chaney (brother); Kate Chaney (niece)
- Children: 3
- Education: University of Western Australia

Frederick Michael Chaney, AO (born 28 October 1941) is an Australian former politician who was deputy leader of the Liberal Party from 1989 to 1990 and served as a minister in the Fraser government. He was a Senator for Western Australia from 1974 to 1990, and then served a single term in the House of Representatives from 1990 to 1993.

Chaney was born in Perth, the son of Sir Frederick Chaney. He was a lawyer before entering politics, graduating from the University of Western Australia. Chaney was elected to the Senate at the 1974 federal election. He held several portfolios in the Fraser government, serving in the ministry from 1978 until the government's defeat at the 1983 election. From 1983 to 1990, Chaney served as Leader of the Opposition in the Senate. He was elected deputy leader of the Liberal Party in 1989, under Andrew Peacock, but served less than a year before being replaced by Peter Reith. Chaney transferred to the House of Representatives at the 1990 election, but served only a single term. After leaving politics he focused on indigenous policy matters, serving on the National Native Title Tribunal (1994–2007), as co-chair of Reconciliation Australia (2000–2005), and as co-founder and Vice-President of The Graham (Polly) Farmer Foundation (1995–current).

== Early life ==
Chaney was born in Perth, Western Australia, the son of Sir Frederick Chaney (a minister in the Menzies government). His six siblings include businessman Michael Chaney and judge John Chaney. Chaney was educated at Aquinas College, Perth, and the University of Western Australia. He practised law and was admitted as a barrister and solicitor in Western Australia in 1963. He spent two years practising in the Territory of Papua and New Guinea. Chaney helped found the Aboriginal Legal Service of Western Australia in 1973.

== Politics ==
Chaney first attempted to enter politics at the 1971 Ascot by-election, running for the state Legislative Assembly. He was elected to federal parliament as a Senator for Western Australia for the Liberal Party at the 1974 election. He was Leader of the Opposition in the Senate from 1983 until 1990 when he became the first member for the Division of Pearce in the House of Representatives, a position he held until 1993. Although still a Senator at the time, Chaney was named deputy leader of the Liberal Party in May 1989. He retained this post until April 1990, two months after transferring to the lower house.

He was elected Deputy Leader as part of the successful coup that saw Andrew Peacock overthrowing John Howard. Howard saw this as a betrayal as he and Chaney had been close friends prior to the coup.

Chaney was ousted as deputy leader after the 1990 election, when he unsuccessfully recontested the position in a field of eight candidates and came in third.

Chaney had earlier defeated Reith for the deputy's position in the leadership coup that ousted Howard in May 1989 in which Reith was Howard's running mate.

Chaney was Minister for Administrative Services from August to December 1978, Minister for Aboriginal Affairs from December 1978 until November 1980 and Minister for Social Security from November 1980 until the defeat of the Fraser government at the 1983 election. He was also Minister Assisting the Minister for Education from August 1978 to December 1979 and Minister Assisting the Minister for National Development and Energy from December 1979 to November 1980.

When Chaney retired in 1993, John Hewson unexpectedly led the Coalition to defeat at that year's election and it is the opinion of analyst and commentator Antony Green that Chaney could have succeeded him as Liberal leader had he not decided to retire. John Hewson described Fred Chaney as "the little ---- from the west."

== Later life ==
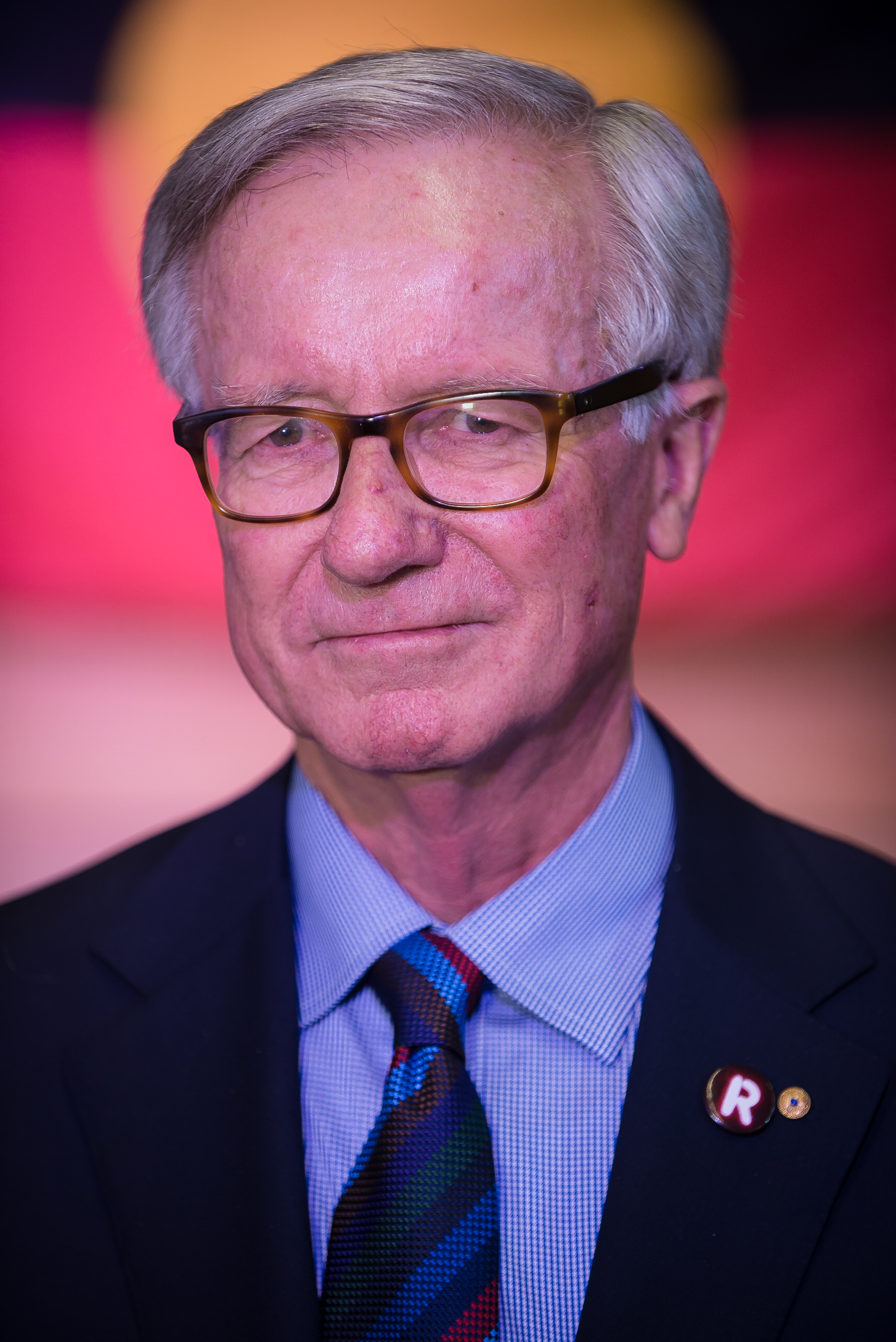
Chaney in 2014.

Chaney was appointed to the National Native Title Tribunal in 1994, initially on a part-time basis. He became a full-time member in 1995 and deputy president in 2000, retiring in 2007. He was also chancellor of Murdoch University from 1995 to 2002, and co-chair of Reconciliation Australia from 2000 to 2005. Chaney left the Liberal Party in 1995, believing that his work "required engagements across party lines and without political involvement".

On 15 January 2020, it was announced that Chaney would be one of the members of the National Co-design Group of the Indigenous voice to government.

=== Criticism of the Liberal Party ===
In early May 2022, Chaney wrote an article criticising the Liberal Party, saying that the party lost its way. Chaney stated "members [of parliament] are no longer able to successfully execute what the electorate demands and it is now in the sad position of being held hostage by its extremes and those of [the National Party]", in particular the party's lack of action on climate change. Chaney called for the election of more centrist independents, against "politics as usual". Chaney announced support for his niece, Kate Chaney, running as a Climate 200-backed independent for the seat of Curtin against the incumbent Liberal member Celia Hammond in the 2022 Australian federal election. Kate Chaney subsequently won the seat at the election.

== Honours ==
Chaney was appointed an Officer of the Order of Australia (AO) in 1997 "for service to the Parliament of Australia and to the Aboriginal community through his contribution to the establishment of the Aboriginal Legal Service of Western Australia and mediating with the National Native Title Tribunal".

Chaney was awarded an honorary doctorate of laws from Murdoch University in 2003 "for services towards Aboriginal reconciliation and as Chancellor", and in 2017 the Australian National University awarded him the same honour, "for his exceptional contribution to public service through parliament and his lifelong commitment to Indigenous issues".

On 25 January 2014, Prime Minister Tony Abbott announced Chaney as the 2014 Senior Australian of the Year.

== See also ==
- Political families of Australia

Parliament of Australia
| New division | Member for Pearce; 1990–1993 | Succeeded by Judi Moylan |
Political offices
| Preceded by Reg Withers | Minister for Administrative Services; 1978 | Succeeded by John McLeay |
| Preceded by Ian Viner | Minister for Aboriginal Affairs; 1978–1980 | Succeeded by Peter Baume |
| Preceded by Margaret Guilfoyle | Minister for Social Security; 1980–1982 | Succeeded by Don Grimes |
Party political offices
| Preceded by John Carrick | Leader of the Liberal Party in the Senate; 1983–1990 | Succeeded by Robert Hill |
| Preceded by Andrew Peacock | Deputy Leader of the Liberal Party of Australia; 1989–1990 | Succeeded by Peter Reith |
