= 1917 Subiaco state by-election =

By-election in Western Australia

A by-election for the seat of Subiaco in the Legislative Assembly of Western Australia was held on 10 November 1917. It was triggered by the death of the sitting member, Bartholomew Stubbs of the Labor Party, on 26 September 1917. The election was won by Samuel Brown, a member of the Subiaco Municipal Council who was standing for the Nationalist Party. Brown was one of six candidates endorsed by the Nationalists, and won the seat despite only polling 15.02 percent of the first-preference vote.

== Background ==
Bartholomew Stubbs, a prominent trade unionist, had held Subiaco for the Labor Party since defeating Henry Daglish (a former premier) at the 1911 state election. He enlisted in the Australian Imperial Force in 1916, and was returned unopposed at the September 1917 state election, but was killed in action in Belgium the same month. The writ for the by-election was issued on 23 October 1917, with the close of nominations on 1 November. Polling day was on 10 November, with the writ returned on 13 November.

== Results ==
Subiaco state by-election, 1917
Party	Candidate	Votes	%	±%
Labor	Edwin Corboy	1,873	40.4	–59.6
Nationalist	Charles Heppingstone	770	16.6	+16.6
Nationalist	Samuel Brown	696	15.0	+15.0
Nationalist	James Guy	588	12.7	+12.7
Nationalist	Edwin Whittaker	448	9.7	+9.7
Nationalist	Thomas Treweek	150	3.2	+3.2
Nationalist	James Chesters	110	2.4	+2.4
Total formal votes		4,635	97.7	n/a
Informal votes		107	2.3	n/a
Turnout		4,742	69.6	n/a
Two-candidate-preferred result
Nationalist	Samuel Brown	2,376	51.3	n/a
Labor	Edwin Corboy	2,259	48.7	n/a
Nationalist gain from Labor		Swing	n/a	

== Aftermath ==
Brown stood for re-election at the 1921 state election, but was defeated by Walter Richardson of the National Labor Party after failing to make the final two-candidate-preferred count. He committed suicide in August 1923.

== See also ==
- List of Western Australian state by-elections
