= Electoral results for the Division of Curtin =

Australian division election results

This is a list of electoral results for the Division of Curtin in Australian federal elections from the division's creation in 1949 until the present.

== Members ==
Member	Party	Term
Paul Hasluck	Liberal	1949–1969
Victor Garland	Liberal	1969 by–1981
Allan Rocher	Liberal	1981 by–1995
Allan Rocher	Independent	1995–1998
Julie Bishop	Liberal	1998–2019
Celia Hammond	Liberal	2019–2022
Kate Chaney	Independent	2022–present

== Election results ==
=== Elections in the 2020s ===
==== 2025 ====
2025 Australian federal election: Curtin
Party	Candidate	Votes	%	±%
Liberal	Tom White			
Greens	Kitty Hemsley			
Independent	Kate Chaney			
One Nation	Alexander Ironside			
Legalise Cannabis	Fred Mulholland			
Labor	Viktor Andrew Ko			
Total formal votes				
Informal votes				
Turnout				

==== 2022 ====
2022 Australian federal election: Curtin
Party	Candidate	Votes	%	±%
Liberal	Celia Hammond	43,408	41.33	−12.68
Independent	Kate Chaney	30,942	29.46	+29.46
Labor	Yannick Spencer	14,654	13.95	−4.63
Greens	Cameron Pidgeon	10,889	10.37	−4.93
United Australia	Ladeisha Verhoeff	1,828	1.74	+0.45
One Nation	Dale Grillo	1,310	1.25	−0.11
Western Australia	Bill Burn	1,243	1.18	−0.37
Federation	Judith Cullity	763	0.73	+0.73
Total formal votes		105,037	96.89	+0.07
Informal votes		3,373	3.11	−0.07
Turnout		108,410	90.90	−1.10
Notional two-party-preferred count
Liberal	Celia Hammond	58,401	55.60	−8.35
Labor	Yannick Spencer	46,636	44.40	+8.35
Two-candidate-preferred result
Independent	Kate Chaney	53,847	51.26	+51.26
Liberal	Celia Hammond	51,190	48.74	−15.21
Independent gain from Liberal				

Alluvial diagram for preference flows in the seat of Curtin in the 2022 federal election. indicates at what stage the winning candidate had over 50% of the votes and was declared the winner.

=== Elections in the 2010s ===
==== 2019 ====
2019 Australian federal election: Curtin
Party	Candidate	Votes	%	±%
Liberal	Celia Hammond	48,256	54.18	−11.32
Labor	Rob Meecham	15,692	17.62	+1.91
Greens	Cameron Pidgeon	13,847	15.55	+1.35
Independent	Louise Stewart	6,902	7.75	+7.75
Western Australia	Andrew Mangano	1,343	1.51	+1.51
United Australia	Joan Lever	1,114	1.25	+1.25
One Nation	Bill Edgar	1,054	1.18	+1.18
Christians	Deonne Kingsford	854	0.96	+0.96
Total formal votes		89,062	96.82	−1.16
Informal votes		2,927	3.18	+1.16
Turnout		91,989	91.65	+1.90
Two-party-preferred result
Liberal	Celia Hammond	57,296	64.33	−6.37
Labor	Rob Meecham	31,766	35.67	+6.37
Liberal hold		Swing	−6.37	

==== 2016 ====
2016 Australian federal election: Curtin
Party	Candidate	Votes	%	±%
Liberal	Julie Bishop	56,175	65.50	+2.99
Labor	Melissa Callanan	13,476	15.71	−1.95
Greens	Viv Glance	12,180	14.20	−0.60
Independent	Sandra Boulter	2,389	2.79	+2.79
Liberty Alliance	David Archibald	1,544	1.80	+1.80
Total formal votes		85,764	97.98	+1.26
Informal votes		1,772	2.02	−1.26
Turnout		87,536	89.75	−3.80
Two-party-preferred result
Liberal	Julie Bishop	60,631	70.70	+2.48
Labor	Melissa Callanan	25,133	29.30	−2.48
Liberal hold		Swing	+2.48	

==== 2013 ====
2013 Australian federal election: Curtin
Party	Candidate	Votes	%	±%
Liberal	Julie Bishop	52,623	62.06	+0.93
Labor	Daryl Tan	15,189	17.91	−1.36
Greens	Judith Cullity	12,985	15.31	−2.41
Palmer United	Glenn Baker	2,237	2.64	+2.64
Christians	Gail Forder	1,058	1.25	+1.25
Rise Up Australia	Jennifer Whately	708	0.83	+0.83
Total formal votes		84,800	96.75	−0.32
Informal votes		2,850	3.25	+0.32
Turnout		87,650	92.86	−0.36
Two-party-preferred result
Liberal	Julie Bishop	57,171	67.42	+1.23
Labor	Daryl Tan	27,629	32.58	−1.23
Liberal hold		Swing	+1.23	

==== 2010 ====
2010 Australian federal election: Curtin
Party	Candidate	Votes	%	±%
Liberal	Julie Bishop	50,024	61.13	+2.17
Labor	Sophie van der Merwe	15,771	19.27	−5.71
Greens	George Crisp	14,498	17.72	+4.49
Christian Democrats	Pat Seymour	1,534	1.87	+0.61
Total formal votes		81,827	97.07	−0.97
Informal votes		2,471	2.93	+0.97
Turnout		84,298	93.25	−0.63
Two-party-preferred result
Liberal	Julie Bishop	54,158	66.19	+2.93
Labor	Sophie van der Merwe	27,669	33.81	−2.93
Liberal hold		Swing	+2.93	

=== Elections in the 2000s ===
==== 2007 ====
2007 Australian federal election: Curtin
Party	Candidate	Votes	%	±%
Liberal	Julie Bishop	46,912	59.27	−0.32
Labor	Peter Grant	19,419	24.53	+0.78
Greens	Lee Hemsley	10,649	13.45	+1.97
Christian Democrats	Gail Forder	1,004	1.27	−0.41
Independent	Shahar Helel	445	0.56	+0.56
Family First	Bev Custers	394	0.50	+0.50
One Nation	Albert Caine	329	0.42	−0.56
Total formal votes		79,152	98.09	+1.61
Informal votes		1,542	1.91	−1.61
Turnout		80,694	93.72	+0.60
Two-party-preferred result
Liberal	Julie Bishop	50,320	63.57	−1.05
Labor	Peter Grant	28,832	36.43	+1.05
Liberal hold		Swing	−1.05	

==== 2004 ====
2004 Australian federal election: Curtin
Party	Candidate	Votes	%	±%
Liberal	Julie Bishop	45,081	59.59	+4.43
Labor	Bill Kruse	17,968	23.75	+0.31
Greens	Sonja Lundie-Jenkins	8,689	11.48	+2.23
Democrats	Rob Olver	1,688	2.23	−4.18
Christian Democrats	Gail Forder	1,272	1.68	+0.67
One Nation	Albert Caine	744	0.98	−1.44
Citizens Electoral Council	Colin Horne	216	0.29	+0.29
Total formal votes		75,658	96.48	−0.22
Informal votes		2,760	3.52	+0.22
Turnout		78,418	93.12	−1.93
Two-party-preferred result
Liberal	Julie Bishop	48,887	64.62	+0.71
Labor	Bill Kruse	26,771	35.38	−0.71
Liberal hold		Swing	+0.71	

==== 2001 ====
2001 Australian federal election: Curtin
Party	Candidate	Votes	%	±%
Liberal	Julie Bishop	41,863	55.16	+10.59
Labor	Trish Fowler	17,789	23.44	+0.69
Greens	Steve Walker	7,019	9.25	+2.93
Democrats	Ashley Buckley	4,863	6.41	+1.60
One Nation	Neil Gilmour	1,840	2.42	−1.28
Liberals for Forests	G. Wood	1,750	2.31	+2.31
Christian Democrats	Karen McDonald	763	1.01	+1.01
Total formal votes		75,887	96.70	−0.57
Informal votes		2,590	3.30	+0.57
Turnout		78,477	95.65	
Two-party-preferred result
Liberal	Julie Bishop	48,502	63.91	+0.43
Labor	Trish Fowler	27,385	36.09	−0.43
Liberal hold		Swing	+0.43	

=== Elections in the 1990s ===
==== 1998 ====
1998 Australian federal election: Curtin
Party	Candidate	Votes	%	±%
Liberal	Julie Bishop	35,174	44.63	+2.69
Labor	Andrew Waddell	18,026	22.87	+2.32
Independent	Allan Rocher	13,925	17.67	−8.06
Greens	Phillip Farren	4,971	6.31	+0.07
Democrats	Stephen Lipple	3,780	4.80	+0.38
One Nation	Ian Trinder	2,934	3.72	+3.72
Total formal votes		78,810	97.22	−0.73
Informal votes		2,255	2.78	+0.73
Turnout		81,065	94.42	−0.83
Two-party-preferred result
Liberal	Julie Bishop	49,870	63.28	+0.06
Labor	Andrew Waddell	28,940	36.72	−0.06
Liberal gain from Independent		Swing	+0.06	

==== 1996 ====
1996 Australian federal election: Curtin
Party	Candidate	Votes	%	±%
Liberal	Ken Court	27,012	39.15	−20.65
Independent	Allan Rocher	20,251	29.35	+29.35
Labor	Steven Roebuck	13,658	19.79	−5.24
Greens	Giz Watson	4,319	6.26	−3.24
Democrats	Michael Barrett	2,947	4.27	+0.85
Natural Law	George Kailis	816	1.18	−0.47
Total formal votes		69,003	97.97	−0.04
Informal votes		1,427	2.03	+0.04
Turnout		70,430	95.25	−0.63
Notional two-party-preferred count
Liberal	Ken Court	43,804	64.05	−1.17
Labor	Steven Roebuck	24,584	35.95	+1.17
Two-candidate-preferred result
Independent	Allan Rocher	39,310	57.28	+57.28
Liberal	Ken Court	29,316	42.72	−22.48
Member changed to Independent from Liberal				

==== 1993 ====
1993 Australian federal election: Curtin
Party	Candidate	Votes	%	±%
Liberal	Allan Rocher	41,417	59.80	+4.87
Labor	David Gilchrist	17,340	25.04	+2.16
Greens	Elisabeth Jones	6,582	9.50	−0.71
Democrats	Willem Bouwer	2,368	3.42	−6.50
Natural Law	Diana Davies	1,142	1.65	+1.65
	Jon Doust	410	0.59	+0.59
Total formal votes		69,259	98.01	+0.87
Informal votes		1,407	1.99	−0.87
Turnout		70,666	95.88	
Two-party-preferred result
Liberal	Allan Rocher	45,149	65.22	+2.41
Labor	David Gilchrist	24,072	34.78	−2.41
Liberal hold		Swing	+2.41	

==== 1990 ====
1990 Australian federal election: Curtin
Party	Candidate	Votes	%	±%
Liberal	Allan Rocher	37,183	54.9	+1.3
Labor	Stephen Booth	15,485	22.9	−10.6
Greens	Mary Salter	6,911	10.2	+10.2
Democrats	Helen Hodgson	6,711	9.9	+1.8
Grey Power	Brett Woodhill	882	1.3	+1.3
Democratic Socialist	Michelle Hovane	518	0.8	+0.8
Total formal votes		67,690	97.1	
Informal votes		1,995	2.9	
Turnout		69,685	94.0	
Two-party-preferred result
Liberal	Allan Rocher	42,406	62.8	+1.4
Labor	Stephen Booth	25,107	37.2	−1.4
Liberal hold		Swing	+1.4	

=== Elections in the 1980s ===
==== 1987 ====
1987 Australian federal election: Curtin
Party	Candidate	Votes	%	±%
Liberal	Allan Rocher	32,912	53.8	−2.4
Labor	Philip Laskaris	20,371	33.3	−2.9
Democrats	Joe Blake	4,967	8.1	+0.5
National	John Gilmour	2,942	4.8	+4.8
Total formal votes		61,192	94.7	
Informal votes		3,397	5.3	
Turnout		64,589	92.2	
Two-party-preferred result
Liberal	Allan Rocher	37,703	61.6	+2.2
Labor	Philip Laskaris	23,486	38.4	−2.2
Liberal hold		Swing	+2.2	

==== 1984 ====
1984 Australian federal election: Curtin
Party	Candidate	Votes	%	±%
Liberal	Allan Rocher	34,519	56.2	+3.6
Labor	Beth Schultz	22,205	36.2	−4.3
Democrats	Marjorie McKercher	4,690	7.6	+0.7
Total formal votes		61,414	94.2	
Informal votes		3,774	5.8	
Turnout		65,188	93.5	
Two-party-preferred result
Liberal	Allan Rocher	36,463	59.4	+4.0
Labor	Beth Schultz	24,942	40.6	−4.0
Liberal hold		Swing	+4.0	

==== 1983 ====
1983 Australian federal election: Curtin
Party	Candidate	Votes	%	±%
Liberal	Allan Rocher	30,404	51.7	−7.2
Labor	Clive Kittson	24,337	41.4	+8.6
Democrats	Marjorie McKercher	4,046	6.9	−1.4
Total formal votes		58,787	98.4	
Informal votes		949	1.6	
Turnout		59,736	93.5	
Two-party-preferred result
Liberal	Allan Rocher		54.5	−7.8
Labor	Clive Kittson		45.5	+7.8
Liberal hold		Swing	−7.8	

==== 1981 by-election ====
Curtin by-election, 1981
Party	Candidate	Votes	%	±%
Liberal	Allan Rocher	22,951	47.04	−11.88
Labor	John Crouch	15,644	32.06	−0.72
Democrats	Shirley de la Hunty	8,356	17.13	+8.83
Independent	Alfred Bussell	1,843	3.78	+3.78
Total formal votes		48,794	96.70	–1.15
Informal votes		1,664	3.30	+1.15
Turnout		50,458	78.21	–14.83
Two-party-preferred result
Liberal	Allan Rocher	27,062	55.46	−6.8
Labor	John Crouch	21,732	44.54	+6.8
Liberal hold		Swing	−6.8	

==== 1980 ====
1980 Australian federal election: Curtin
Party	Candidate	Votes	%	±%
Liberal	Victor Garland	35,373	58.9	+0.1
Labor	Richard Grounds	19,680	32.8	+8.4
Democrats	Gary Payne	4,985	8.3	−6.1
Total formal votes		60,038	97.8	
Informal votes		1,321	2.2	
Turnout		61,359	93.0	
Two-party-preferred result
Liberal	Victor Garland		62.3	−6.5
Labor	Richard Grounds		37.7	+6.5
Liberal hold		Swing	−6.5	

=== Elections in the 1970s ===
==== 1977 ====
1977 Australian federal election: Curtin
Party	Candidate	Votes	%	±%
Liberal	Victor Garland	38,988	58.8	−7.5
Labor	Patricia Giles	16,207	24.4	−9.3
Democrats	Richard Bunting	9,522	14.4	+14.4
Progress	James MacDonald	1,628	2.5	+2.5
Total formal votes		66,345	97.6	
Informal votes		1,654	2.4	
Turnout		67,999	93.3	
Two-party-preferred result
Liberal	Victor Garland		68.8	+2.5
Labor	Patricia Giles		31.2	−2.5
Liberal hold		Swing	+2.5	

==== 1975 ====
1975 Australian federal election: Curtin
Party	Candidate	Votes	%	±%
Liberal	Victor Garland	41,901	66.3	+12.4
Labor	John Crouch	21,253	33.7	−5.2
Total formal votes		63,154	97.9	
Informal votes		1,371	2.1	
Turnout		64,525	94.7	
Liberal hold		Swing	+7.0	

==== 1974 ====
1974 Australian federal election: Curtin
Party	Candidate	Votes	%	±%
Liberal	Victor Garland	33,267	53.9	−1.9
Labor	John Crouch	24,016	38.9	+5.3
National Alliance	Terry McDonnell	3,051	4.9	−0.4
Australia	Dennis Fyfe	728	1.2	−4.1
Independent	Jeannette Forsyth	700	1.1	+1.1
Total formal votes		61,762	97.7	
Informal votes		1,460	2.3	
Turnout		63,222	94.3	
Two-party-preferred result
Liberal	Victor Garland		59.3	−2.9
Labor	John Crouch		40.7	+2.9
Liberal hold		Swing	−2.9	

==== 1972 ====
1972 Australian federal election: Curtin
Party	Candidate	Votes	%	±%
Liberal	Victor Garland	29,131	58.5	+8.7
Labor	Sue Neacy	15,373	30.9	−3.7
Australia	Maurene Locke	2,652	5.3	+3.0
Democratic Labor	Peter McGowan	2,634	5.3	−1.8
Total formal votes		49,790	98.0	
Informal votes		1,037	2.0	
Turnout		50,827	93.6	
Two-party-preferred result
Liberal	Victor Garland		64.9	+4.8
Labor	Sue Neacy		35.1	−4.8
Liberal hold		Swing	+4.8	

=== Elections in the 1960s ===
==== 1969 ====
1969 Australian federal election: Curtin
Party	Candidate	Votes	%	±%
Liberal	Victor Garland	24,855	49.8	−8.4
Labor	John Williamson	17,275	34.7	+2.7
Democratic Labor	Francis Dwyer	3,533	7.1	−2.7
Independent	Robert Scoggins	3,047	6.1	+6.1
Australia	Len McEntee	1,151	2.3	+2.3
Total formal votes		49,861	97.7	
Informal votes		1,177	2.3	
Turnout		51,038	95.3	
Two-party-preferred result
Liberal	Victor Garland		60.1	−5.9
Labor	John Williamson		39.9	+5.9
Liberal hold		Swing	−5.9	

==== 1969 by-election ====
1969 Curtin by-election
Party	Candidate	Votes	%	±%
Liberal	Victor Garland	17,983	50.5	−9.4
Labor	Hayden Jones	11,047	31.0	+0.7
Independent	Robert Scoggins	6,586	18.5	+18.5
Total formal votes		35,616	98.3	
Informal votes		608	1.7	
Turnout		36,224	80.8	
Two-party-preferred result
Liberal	Victor Garland		59.8	−7.9
Labor	Hayden Jones		40.2	+7.9
Liberal hold		Swing	−7.9	

==== 1966 ====
1966 Australian federal election: Curtin
Party	Candidate	Votes	%	±%
Liberal	Paul Hasluck	24,135	59.9	−15.7
Labor	John Brind	12,206	30.3	+30.3
Democratic Labor	Francis Dwyer	3,945	9.8	−8.3
Total formal votes		40,286	97.2	
Informal votes		1,580	3.8	
Turnout		41,866	94.6	
Two-party-preferred result
Liberal	Paul Hasluck		67.7	−11.1
Labor	John Brind		32.3	+32.3
Liberal hold		Swing	−11.1	

==== 1963 ====
1963 Australian federal election: Curtin
Party	Candidate	Votes	%	±%
Liberal	Paul Hasluck	29,200	75.6	+12.4
Democratic Labor	Francis Dwyer	6,992	18.1	+6.0
Communist	John Gandini	2,426	6.3	+6.3
Total formal votes		38,618	93.5	
Informal votes		2,669	6.5	
Turnout		41,287	95.9	
Two-party-preferred result
Liberal	Paul Hasluck		78.8	+5.7
Democratic Labor	Francis Dwyer		21.2	+21.2
Liberal hold		Swing	+5.7	

==== 1961 ====
1961 Australian federal election: Curtin
Party	Candidate	Votes	%	±%
Liberal	Paul Hasluck	24,811	63.2	−0.5
Labor	George Piesley	9,698	24.7	+2.5
Democratic Labor	Wilfred Bodeker	4,768	12.1	−2.0
Total formal votes		39,277	97.6	
Informal votes		969	2.4	
Turnout		40,246	94.7	
Two-party-preferred result
Liberal	Paul Hasluck		73.1	−2.1
Labor	George Piesley		26.9	+2.1
Liberal hold		Swing	−2.1	

=== Elections in the 1950s ===
==== 1958 ====
1958 Australian federal election: Curtin
Party	Candidate	Votes	%	±%
Liberal	Paul Hasluck	24,605	63.7	−36.3
Labor	Frederick Traine	8,576	22.2	+22.2
Democratic Labor	John Antill	5,440	14.1	+14.1
Total formal votes				
Informal votes				
Turnout				
Two-party-preferred result
Liberal	Paul Hasluck		75.2	−24.8
Labor	Frederick Traine		24.8	+24.8
Liberal hold		Swing	−24.8	

==== 1955 ====
1955 Australian federal election: Curtin
Party	Candidate	Votes	%	±%
Liberal	Paul Hasluck	unopposed		
Liberal hold		Swing		

==== 1954 ====
1954 Australian federal election: Curtin
Party	Candidate	Votes	%	±%
Liberal	Paul Hasluck	23,950	61.3	−3.4
Labor	Harry Bishop	15,089	38.7	+3.4
Total formal votes		39,039	98.7	
Informal votes		530	1.3	
Turnout		39,569	96.1	
Liberal hold		Swing	−3.4	

==== 1951 ====
1951 Australian federal election: Curtin
Party	Candidate	Votes	%	±%
Liberal	Paul Hasluck	25,998	64.7	+3.5
Labor	John Henshaw	14,193	35.3	−3.5
Total formal votes		40,191	97.9	
Informal votes		863	2.1	
Turnout		41,054	96.0	
Liberal hold		Swing	+3.5	

=== Elections in the 1940s ===
==== 1949 ====
1949 Australian federal election: Curtin
Party	Candidate	Votes	%	±%
Liberal	Paul Hasluck	24,857	61.2	+15.7
Labor	William Lonnie	15,781	38.8	−12.6
Total formal votes		40,638	98.1	
Informal votes		803	1.9	
Turnout		41,441	95.1	
Liberal notional gain from Labor		Swing	+13.8	
