= Tom Dadour =

Australian politician and doctor (1925 – 2011)

Dr Tom Dadour AM
- Dadour in 1974

Member of the Western Australian Legislative Assembly
- In office 20 February 1971 – 8 February 1986
- Preceded by: Hugh Guthrie
- Succeeded by: Carmen Lawrence
- Constituency: Subiaco

Subiaco City Councillor
- In office May 1966 – May 1978
- Constituency: Central Ward

Personal details
- Born: Gabriel Thomas Dadour; 19 April 1925 Waterloo, New South Wales, Australia
- Died: 17 March 2011 (aged 85) Nedlands, Western Australia, Australia
- Party: Liberal (1970–1983)
- Other political affiliations: Independent (from 1983)
- Occupation: General practitioner

Gabriel Thomas Dadour AM (19 April 1925 – 17 March 2011) was an Australian politician and doctor. He was a member of the Western Australian Legislative Assembly for Subiaco from February 1971 to February 1986, representing the Liberal Party until 1983, when he resigned from the party and became an independent. He was also a Subiaco City Councillor from 1966 to 1978. He was known for often voting against his own party in Parliament and speaking out against his party and its leader.

Born and raised in Sydney, Dadour served in the Royal Australian Naval Reserve from April 1945 to November 1946. He then completed a medical degree at the University of Sydney before moving to Perth to start his career as a general practitioner. He became involved with the Subiaco Football Club as a sports doctor. Dadour was elected to Parliament at the 1971 state election. He worked to have the state's Local Government Act amended to require a referendum for local government boundary changes. He was outspoken in his opposition to the 1979 closure of the Perth–Fremantle railway line by his own party, and in his support for a ban on tobacco advertising. He introduced a private member's bill to ban tobacco advertising, which passed the Legislative Assembly but was narrowly defeated in the Legislative Council. After announcing his retirement from politics at the 1986 state election, Dadour endorsed the Labor Party.

== Early life ==
Dadour was born on 19 April 1925 in Waterloo, New South Wales, a suburb of Sydney. He was the fourth of five children of Alexander Elias Dadour and Nabeeha Cannon Zazbeck. His paternal grandfather was a Melkite Christian who arrived in Australia in 1888. His mother's family were Maronite Christians who owned a Lebanese restaurant in Redfern.

Dadour was educated at Cleveland Primary School, Cleveland High School, and Sydney Boys High School. He then accepted a university offer in exchange for military service, enlisting in the Royal Australian Naval Reserve on 19 April 1945. From 6 November 1945 to 3 September 1946, he served aboard HMAS Hobart; for five days in September 1946, he served aboard HMAS LST 3008; and for eleven days in October 1946, he served aboard HMAS Waree. He served in Japan as part of the British Commonwealth Occupation Force when prisoners of war were freed. He was discharged on 15 November 1946.

From 1947 to 1952 Dadour studied at the University of Sydney, completing a Bachelor of Medicine and Surgery. At university, he met his future wife, a midwifery student from Perth. They moved to Perth in January 1953 and they married later that year. Dadour was a resident from 1953 to 1956, working at various hospitals including Royal Perth Hospital, King Edward Memorial Hospital, and the Shenton Park Annex. On 4 January 1957 he opened his own general practice in Subiaco.

In 1956 Dadour joined the Subiaco Football Club, becoming the club doctor a year later. He was appointed an honorary life member of the Subiaco Football Club in 1966.

Dadour was elected to the central ward of the Subiaco City Council on 20 May 1966, replacing the retiring E. Congdon. He was re-elected in yearly elections from then until 1977. In March 1978, Dadour announced that he would not stand for the council election in May due to his increasing workload as a member of parliament and as a councillor.

== State government ==
Dadour joined the Liberal Party in 1970. He was approached by Premier David Brand and supported by the Australian Medical Association to stand for State Parliament in the 1971 state election. Dadour stood for the Legislative Assembly (lower house) seat of Subiaco after the incumbent Liberal member Hugh Guthrie announced his retirement. Guthrie had won just a 98-vote majority in 1968, but Dadour managed to be elected with a 1,112-vote majority, despite the defeat of the Brand government in that same election. Dadour was re-elected in the 1974, 1977, 1980, and 1983 state elections. He came close to not being re-endorsed for the 1977 state election after making comments critical of the premier and the Liberal Party. Nominations were extended by a week, but Dadour ended up being re-endorsed anyway. He was nearly defeated in the 1983 state election after an unfavourable redistribution of his seat's boundaries which removed Shenton Park and added Leederville and Mount Hawthorn. He successfully sought for the name Subiaco to be retained for the seat, which was otherwise planned to be renamed Wembley. Dadour was a member of the Library Committee from 1971 to 1979 and the Select Committee on Alcohol and Other Drugs from August 1983 to May 1984.

Since the early 1960s, there had been proposals for boundary changes to the City of Subiaco. The City of Nedlands wanted the area between the northern end of Winthrop Avenue and Pelican Point transferred between the two local governments to neaten the boundary. In 1968, the state government also wanted the City of Subiaco to be abolished and replaced by the City of Perth north of Nicholson Road and the City of Nedlands south of Nicholson Road, as part of a plan to reduce the number of local governments in the Perth metropolitan area from twenty-seven to seventeen. The Subiaco City Council wanted the Local Government Act to be amended to require a referendum of the affected residents before any boundary changes. In March 1973, Dadour made a speech in Parliament condemning the John Tonkin government's handling of local government mergers and calling for the Local Government Act's amendment. He also revealed a letter written by Premier Tonkin in 1969 showing that he opposed the council mergers back when he was opposition leader. After the election of a Liberal government in 1974, Dadour lobbied the premier to support an amendment to the act. In 1975, an amendment passed Parliament, by which point, it had become known as the Dadour Bill. It provided that a poll could be necessitated if demanded by fifty or more ratepayers.

Dadour became known for verbal aggression, which annoyed those within his own party, and which, in June 1973, escalated to him punching Labor MLA Mal Bryce, nineteen years his junior, on the right eyebrow while on a Parliamentary tour in Port Hedland.

In September 1975, Dadour claimed that certain police officers were receiving a share of proceeds from prostitution, putting pressure on Premier Charles Court to call a royal commission into prostitution. The following month, a royal commission was called. Dadour said his position was that prostitution should be allowed but regulated as it was inevitable that prostitution took place. In 1977, Dadour stated he supported the death penalty for heroin dealers. In November 1977, his abstention from voting led to the defeat of the government's controversial Electoral Act Amendment Bill, which would have made it harder for illiterate people to vote. The bill was particularly aimed at making it harder for Aboriginal people in the Kimberley region to vote. In 1980, he successfully prevented the government from increasing the size of the ministry from thirteen to fifteen.

In 1979, Court announced that the Perth–Fremantle railway line would be permanently closed and replaced by buses due to low patronage. Dadour was one of the most prominent critics of the decision. He presented a petition with 95,000 signatures to Parliament, but nevertheless, the line closed later that year. In 1980, he threatened to lock National Country Party MLA Bert Crane in his office to prevent him from voting against Dadour's motion calling for the Fremantle line to be reopened, for which the Speaker of the Legislative Assembly rebuked him. After the election of a Labor government at the 1983 state election, the Fremantle line was reopened on 29 July 1983. Dadour rode in the driver's cab with Premier Brian Burke and Labor MP Ken McIver on the inaugural train to Subiaco.

In 1982, Dadour introduced a private member's bill to ban tobacco advertising. The bill was drafted by David Malcolm and given by respiratory physician Bill Musk to the health minister, who failed to do anything with it. Musk then went to Dadour, who was enthusiastic about introducing the bill. It was the first bill to ban tobacco advertising in Australia, and was strongly supported by the Australian Medical Association, but was opposed by tobacco companies, newspapers and sports leagues. To allay the concerns of sports leagues, Dadour amended his bill to delay its introduction if passed until July 1983 to allow leagues more time to get different sponsors. The bill passed the Legislative Assembly despite being opposed by Premier Ray O'Connor and his cabinet, but it was defeated in the Legislative Council. In October 1983, Dadour was suspended from the Liberal Party for claiming that some politicians were bribed by the tobacco industry to oppose anti-smoking legislation. He resigned from the party that same month, becoming an independent. In 1991 a ban on tobacco advertising was put in place.

In December 1985, Dadour announced his retirement from Parliament at the February 1986 state election. The candidates to succeed Dadour were former federal Liberal member for Perth Ross McLean and future Labor premier Carmen Lawrence. The Labor party did not expect to win the seat as Lawrence was the only candidate for preselection, but the odds swung to Lawrence's favour after Dadour's shock endorsement of her. He had known Lawrence as she was a patient of his. During the campaign. Dadour took her to meetings with Catholic priests as he said they were an important part of the community. During one such meeting, he jumped to her defence on the issue of abortion.

== Later life ==
Dadour retired as a doctor in 2005. In his later years, he developed Parkinson's disease. Dadour died of pneumonia on 17 March 2011, aged 85, at Hollywood Private Hospital in Nedlands. He was buried at Karrakatta Cemetery.

== Awards and honours ==
On 1 August 1977, Dadour was awarded the Queen Elizabeth II Silver Jubilee Medal. In 1986, he was made a freeman of the City of Subiaco. In 2000, Dadour was honoured with the naming of the Tom Dadour Community Centre in Subiaco. Dadour was awarded the Centenary Medal on 1 January 2001 and appointed a Member of the Order of Australia at the 2001 Australia Day Honours "for service to the community of Subiaco, particularly as a general practitioner, to local government and to the Western Australian Parliament."

== Family ==
Dadour's first marriage was to Lesley Joan Clarke, on 18 July 1953 at St Margaret's Church in Nedlands. They had two daughters and two sons together. After divorcing in September 1982, Dadour married Betty Elaine Davey Douglas on 10 December 1982. He remarried Joan in 2004.

== See also ==
- Electoral results for the district of Subiaco

Parliament of Western Australia
Preceded by Hugh Guthrie	Member for Subiaco; 20 February 1971 – 8 February 1986	Succeeded by Carmen Lawrence
