= Kate Chaney =

Australian politician

Kate Chaney MP
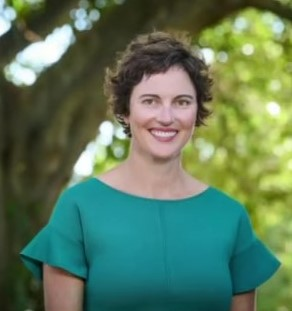
- Chaney in 2022

Member of the Australian Parliament for Curtin
- Incumbent
- Assumed office 21 May 2022
- Preceded by: Celia Hammond

Personal details
- Born: 21 January 1975 (age 51) United States
- Citizenship: Australian
- Party: Independent (2022–present)
- Other political affiliations: Labor (2021)
- Children: 3
- Parent: Michael Chaney (father)
- Relatives: Fred Chaney Sr. (grandfather); Fred Chaney (uncle); John Chaney (uncle)
- Education: John XXIII College
- Alma mater: University of Western Australia (LLB)
- Occupation: Manager; politician
- Website: www.katechaney.com.au

Katherine Ella Chaney (born 21 January 1975) is an Australian independent politician, who was elected to the Australian House of Representatives at the 2022 Australian federal election, succeeding Liberal Party MP Celia Hammond in the division of Curtin.

== Early life and career ==
Chaney was born on 21 January 1975 in the United States. Her father is Michael Chaney, a businessman. Her father's brothers include Fred Chaney, a former Liberal Party Senator for WA, and Member for the Division of Pearce. Her grandfather is Fred Chaney Sr., who was a Liberal Party MP and minister in the Menzies government. On her mother's side, her great-grandfather is Hubert Parker (Ministerialist) and his father is Stephen Henry Parker (Nationalist/Liberal), both of whom served in the Parliament of Western Australia.

Chaney attended John XXIII College and the University of Western Australia. In 1998, after graduating university, she joined law firm Blake Dawson Waldron in Sydney. In 2003, she finished an MBA and moved to the Boston Consulting Group as a strategic advisor. She later became General Manager Business Development at Westralia Airports Corporation, managing company of Perth Airport. She then moved to Wesfarmers, working there as Aboriginal affairs manager and sustainability manager. From 2017 to 2022, she worked as the director of innovation and strategy for Anglicare WA.

== Political career ==
In December 2021, Curtin Independent was formed to search for an independent candidate for the Division of Curtin, a seat held by the Liberal Party for almost all of its existence. At the time, the seat was held by Celia Hammond. Curtin Independent was part of a wider movement of political community engagement groups formed ahead of the 2022 Australian federal election to field independent candidates. On 27 January 2022, Curtin Independent announced that Chaney was selected by the group to run as an independent candidate for Curtin.

Her election campaign spent almost A$1 million, including $350,000 from Climate 200.

Supporters of Chaney during the election campaign included Fred Chaney, who wrote an opinion piece in WAtoday, The Sydney Morning Herald, and The Age supporting her and saying the Liberal Party has "lost its way". The Greens encouraged their supporters to preference Chaney ahead of other candidates by putting her second.

At the 2022 election, which was held on 21 May 2022, Chaney was elected as the member for Curtin, defeating Hammond with 51% of the two-candidate-preferred vote to Hammond's 49%. Chaney has been labelled as one of a group of "teal independents" who were elected at the 2022 federal election.

Chaney was re-elected at the 2025 election, defeating Liberal candidate Tom White following strong campaigns from both sides, in what was perceived as a key race in shaping the election outcome. The ABC reported Chaney had received over $900,000 in the four months preceding the election, with White responding "if your opponent is spending well over seven figures then there's an obligation to respond" when asked about his campaign spending.

In August 2026, Chaney, along with Coalition members Andrew Hastie, Aaron Violi, Jonathon Duniam, initiated the Joint Select Committee on Artificial Intelligence, which was established on 20 August 2026.

== Political views ==
Chaney describes herself as "economically sensible and socially progressive." Her major election issues included action on climate change and integrity in politics.

Chaney supported the establishment of the Indigenous Voice to Parliament and campaigned for the Yes vote in the 2023 Australian Indigenous Voice referendum. She has called for the planned stage three tax cuts, due to take effect in 2024, to be cancelled. Chaney said, "On balance, I don’t think it makes sense to go through with the Stage 3 cuts right now. Other than budget repair, there are a lot of things this government could achieve with $243 billion".

== Personal life ==
As of 2022, Chaney lives with her three children and husband.

== See also ==
- Electoral results for the Division of Curtin
- Teal independents
- Political families of Australia

Parliament of Australia
Preceded by Celia Hammond	Member for Curtin; 2022–present	Incumbent
