= Samuel McConnell Brown =

Australian politician

Samuel Brown

Member of the Legislative Assembly of Western Australia
- In office 10 November 1917 – 12 March 1921
- Preceded by: Bartholomew Stubbs
- Succeeded by: Walter Richardson
- Constituency: Subiaco

Personal details
- Born: c. 1865 near Ballarat, Victoria, Australia
- Died: 24 August 1923 Perth, Western Australia, Australia
- Party: Liberal (to 1917); Nationalist (from 1917)
- Other political affiliations: Independent (1901)

Samuel McConnell Brown (c. 1865 – 24 August 1923) was an Australian politician who was a member of the Legislative Assembly of Western Australia from 1917 to 1921, representing the seat of Subiaco.

Brown was born near Ballarat, Victoria, to Margaret (née Matheson) and George McConnell Brown. He came to Western Australia in 1896, during the gold rush, and the following year opened a bakery in Coolgardie. He subsequently moved to Perth, opening another bakery in Subiaco. Brown was elected to the Subiaco Municipal Council in 1898, serving until 1905 and then again from 1906 to 1917. He first stood for parliament at the 1901 state election, as an independent, but was defeated in Subiaco by Labor's Henry Daglish (a future premier). He again lost to Daglish at the 1905 election, standing as a Ministerialist.

At the 1917 Subiaco by-election, Brown stood for a third time and was elected, replacing Labor's Bartholomew Stubbs (who had been killed in action in Flanders). He served only a single term, losing his seat to Walter Richardson of the National Labor Party at the 1921 state election. In late August 1923, Brown disappeared from his home in Subiaco and did not return. Police and residents mounted a search of the surrounding area, and even employed a black tracker to assist them. Brown's body was found four days later, in bushland near Herdsman Lake. His throat was a cut and a razor found next to the body, leading the coroner to return a verdict of suicide.

Parliament of Western Australia
Preceded by Bartholomew Stubbs	Member for Subiaco; 1917–1921	Succeeded by Walter Richardson
