= 1969 Curtin by-election =

- 19 April 1969

The Division of Curtin (WA) in the House of Representatives
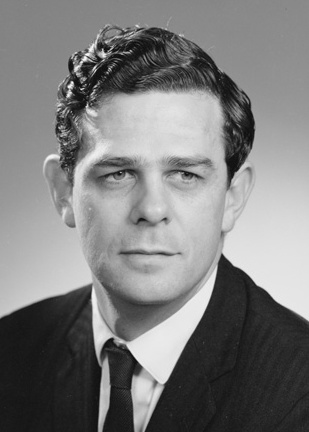

	First party	Second party
Candidate	Victor Garland	Hayden Jones
Party	Liberal	Labor
Popular vote	17,983	11,047
Percentage	50.5%	31.0%
2PP	59.8%	40.2%
2PP change	▼0.1	▲0.1
MP before election
Paul Hasluck
Liberal
Elected MP
Victor Garland
Liberal

A by-election was held for the Australian House of Representatives seat of Curtin on 19 April 1969. This was triggered by the resignation of Liberal MP Sir Paul Hasluck to become Governor-General. It was the first federal by-election to be held in Western Australia since the 1945 Fremantle by-election, and only the seventh since Federation.

The by-election was won by Liberal candidate Victor Garland.

== Key dates ==
Date	Event
10 February 1969	Sir Paul Hasluck resigned from Parliament.
14 March 1969	The writ for the by-election was issued.
31 March 1969	Close of nominations.
19 April 1969	Polling day.
24 April 1969	The writ was returned.
29 April 1969	Victor Garland was sworn in as the member for Curtin.

== Candidates ==
The Liberal Party's candidate was Victor Garland, a 34-year-old chartered accountant who was also deputy mayor of the Town of Claremont and senior vice-president of the Liberal Party in Western Australia. The preselection, which took place on 20 March and was ratified on 24 March by the party's State Council, had approximately 15 contestants, among whom Garland and party president (later Senator) Peter Durack were regarded as the main contenders. Others included lawyer John Huelin, a Methodist minister, a naval commodore and the Moore divisional president.

The Labor Party's candidate was Hayden Jones, a 29-year-old schoolteacher at Swanbourne Senior High School.

Captain Robert Scoggins (37) ran as an independent, backed by the Association for the Abolition of the Means Test, who had campaigned on social welfare issues.

The Democratic Labor Party (DLP) decided not to run in Curtin. The DLP's secretary, John Martyr, asked its supporters in the final week to vote for Scoggins.

== Campaign ==
As a safe Liberal seat, Labor did not expect to win, but Opposition Leader Gough Whitlam predicted a large swing against the government. In a campaign stop on 1 April, Whitlam said Labor would campaign on the cost of land in Perth — the cheapest in Australia ten years previously but the most expensive by 1969 — and the danger of overseas companies controlling Western Australian mineral resources. Other issues included what he described as a deteriorating standard of Australian schools and the need for an Australian Schools Commission. The Canberra press gallery correspondent of the West Australian, Geoffrey Paddick, believed the three by-elections would be a key test of Prime Minister John Gorton's leadership, amidst allegations about his personal conduct and "one-man-bandmanship", and Whitlam's greater experience and energy in campaigning.

On 17 April, Jones accused Garland of illegal campaigning and spending more than the $500 legal limit on expenses. He also expressed annoyance at Scoggins for what he described as milking protest votes that would otherwise have gone to Labor. Scoggins countered that he hoped to attract votes from both parties as neither of them were dealing adequately with social justice issues.

== Results ==
Garland won the election with a majority of primary votes, but with a significantly reduced majority. Scoggins attained almost double the DLP vote from 1966. Opposition leader Gough Whitlam commented: "Curtin has been among the half dozen most undeviatingly conservative electorates in Australia. Reports from scrutineers indicate that at least half, and in some subdivisions well over half, of Mr Scoggins's preferences would come to Labor. This confirms the extent and reality of the swing". Prime Minister John Gorton said: "In this particular poll, neither ourselves nor the Labor Party can draw much comfort from the figures." He noted the tradition of by-elections going against the government, the large number of people (19.2% compared to 5.4% at the 1966 election) who failed to vote at all, and the loss of Sir Paul Hasluck's personal vote. Of Scoggins, Gorton said: "An interesting aspect was the relatively large vote polled by Mr Scoggins, who had campaigned on a non-party basis with social service questions as his exclusive issue."

In declaring victory, Garland said he believed the result was satisfactory and that the anti-government swing had been anticipated, expecting that the vote would return at the general election. Jones said the swing foreshadowed a Labor victory at the 1969 election, and that his scrutineers reported two-thirds of Scoggins' preferences in the Leederville subdivision were going to Labor, while in the Dalkeith subdivision they were splitting 50-50. (There is no way to verify this claim, as under the Electoral Act at the time, preferences were not formally reported if the leading candidate won over 50% of the primary vote—the below calculation by Adam Carr and Malcolm MacKerras assumes a 50-50 split electorate-wide.) A spokesman for the Association for the Abolition of the Means Test was pleased with the result, predicting the election result would be reflected in the 1969 budget, and the association intended to enter three candidates to oppose Liberal MPs (Freeth, Chaney and Cleaver) at the 1969 election if the fight was still necessary.

1969 Curtin by-election
Party	Candidate	Votes	%	±%
Liberal	Victor Garland	17,983	50.5	−9.4
Labor	Hayden Jones	11,047	31.0	+0.7
Independent	Robert Scoggins	6,586	18.5	+18.5
Total formal votes		35,616	98.3	
Informal votes		608	1.7	
Turnout		36,224	80.8	
Two-party-preferred result
Liberal	Victor Garland		59.8	−7.9
Labor	Hayden Jones		40.2	+7.9
Liberal hold		Swing	−7.9	
