= Michael Chaney =

Australian businessman

Michael Chaney AO
- Born: Michael Alfred Chaney; 15 April 1950 (age 76); Perth, Western Australia
- Education: Aquinas College, Perth; University of Western Australia
- Occupation: Businessman
- Children: Kate Chaney
- Parent: Fred Chaney Sr.
- Relatives: Fred Chaney Jr. (brother); John Chaney (brother)

Michael Alfred Chaney AO (born 15 April 1950) is an Australian businessman and former chancellor of the University of Western Australia.

== Early life ==
Chaney was born in Perth on 15 April 1950. He was the third-youngest of seven children born to Frederick Charles Chaney, who was a minister in the Menzies government and Lord Mayor of Perth. His brothers included Frederick Michael Chaney, who was a deputy leader of the Liberal Party, and John Chaney, a judge on the Supreme Court of Western Australia.

Chaney attended Aquinas College, Perth, and the University of Western Australia. He completed a Bachelor of Science degree in geology in 1972 and a Master of Business Administration (MBA) in 1980. He attended the six-week Advanced Management Program at Harvard Business School in 1992. He was awarded an honorary doctorate from the University of Western Australia.

== Career ==
Chaney worked as a petroleum geologist for eight years. His first job in geology was with Burmah Oil, where he worked on the North West Shelf Venture. In 1974 he moved to Houston, Texas, in the aftermath of the 1973 oil crisis. After returning to Australia he joined the Australian Industry Development Corporation (AIDC) in 1980 and opened its Perth office. At AIDC he "helped organise financing for the multibillion-dollar North-West Shelf development, Delhi/Santos's gas fields in the Cooper Basin, coalmines and coal loaders" during the resources boom of the 1980s.

Chaney became managing director of Wesfarmers in 1992, having previously served as company secretary and chief financial officer. He oversaw the acquisition of Dalgety Farmers Ltd's pastoral business in 1993. The following year he announced that Wesfarmers had entered into a joint venture with Vietnamese firm Petrolimex for a liquefied petroleum gas plant in Vietnam, which was reportedly Wesfarmers' first major overseas investment. Chaney also oversaw Wesfarmers' acquisition of Bunnings and divestment of its Landmark rural finance business. In 2001, the Australian Financial Review reported that Wesfarmers' market capitalisation had increased from $1.1 billion to $10 billion during Chaney's tenure and that he had "done something that has eluded most Australian chief executives: made a success of a conglomerate structure".

Chaney was chairman of the National Australia Bank from 2005 to 2015, Chairman of Woodside Petroleum until 2016 and has been chairman of Wesfarmers since 2013, a Director of the Centre for Independent Studies, and the former Chancellor of the University of Western Australia, between 2005 and 2017. He was a director of BHP from 1995 to 2005 and a member of the JPMorgan Chase International Council from 2004 to 2015.

== Honours ==
Chaney was appointed Officer of the Order of Australia on 14 June 2004 for service to the business sector through innovative leadership and management strategies, and to the community through involvement with and support for a broad range of artistic, cultural and scientific organisations.

Academic offices
Preceded by Ken Michael	Chancellor of the University of Western Australia; 2005 – 2017	Succeeded by Robert French
