= Florence Cardell-Oliver =

Australian politician (1876–1965)

Dame Florence Cardell-Oliver DBE
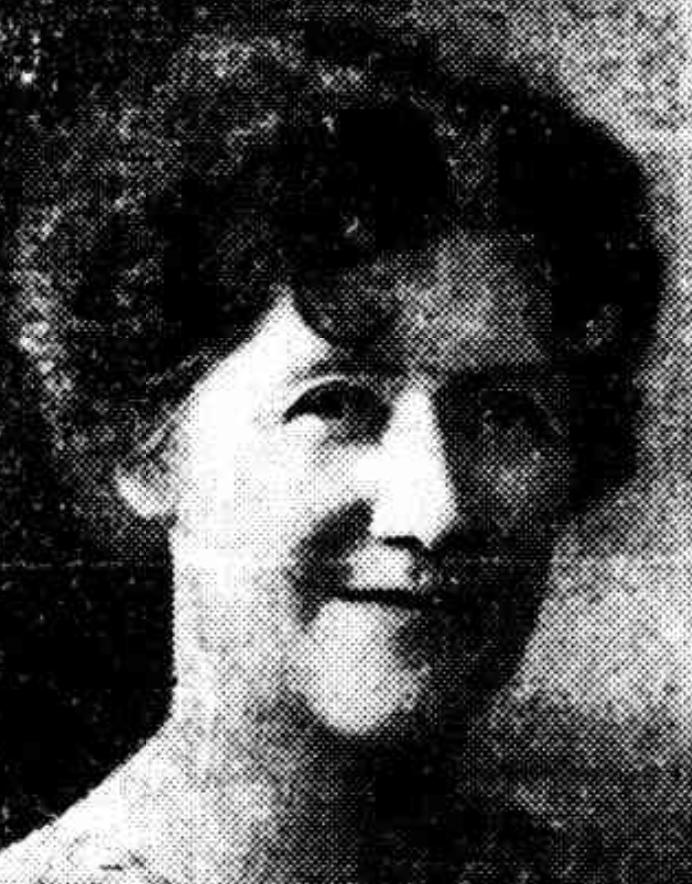
- Florence Cardell-Oliver, MLA for Subiaco, Western Australia, c1936

Member of Parliament for Subiaco
- In office 15 February 1936 – 7 April 1956
- Preceded by: John Moloney
- Succeeded by: Percival Potter

Minister for Health
- In office 7 October 1949 – 7 January 1953
- Preceded by: Arthur Abbott
- Succeeded by: Emil Nulsen

Personal details
- Born: Annie Florence Gillies Wilson; 11 May 1876 Stawell, Victoria
- Died: 12 January 1965 (aged 88) Subiaco, Perth, Western Australia
- Resting place: St Columb Minor Church, Cornwall, England
- Party: Nationalist Party of Australia; Liberal Party
- Spouse(s): David Sykes Boydan (1895–1902; his death); Arthur Cardell-Oliver (1902–1929; his death); 2 sons

Dame Annie Florence Gillies Cardell-Oliver, DBE (née Wilson; 11 May 1876 — 12 January 1965) was a Western Australian politician and political activist, often known publicly as simply Florence Cardell-Oliver.

She was the longest-serving female State Parliamentarian in Western Australia, serving in parliament from 15 February 1936 to 7 April 1956, until her record was broken in September 2011 by Liz Constable.

== Background/family ==
Born Annie Florence Gillies Wilson to Johnston Wilson and Annie Thompson, she married, firstly, David Sykes Boydan. They travelled to England, where David Boydan died on 5 September 1902. Later she remarried, to Arthur Cardell-Oliver and they had two sons. The family migrated to Western Australia and Arthur Cardell-Oliver registered as a doctor in 1912. During the First World War she spoke at recruitment meetings for the armed services.

Her husband, an honorary captain in the Army Medical Corps Reserve, joined the Australian Imperial Force, and served in England before requesting his appointment be terminated. He then set up a medical practice in South Melbourne and retired in 1924 due to ill health. The family travelled to England where he died on 15 September 1929. She was buried beside Arthur in St Columb Minor churchyard, Newquay, Cornwall.

== Women activism ==
Florence was the first woman to get a full Cabinet rank in Australian parliament, and was thoroughly involved in conservative women's organisations. Through this she made certain acts where she sponsored legislations connecting to the public health of women and children. In 1935, an invite given by Mustafa Kemal Atatürk, was present at a congress in Istanbul of the International Suffrage Alliance of Women that represented the women in the Australian Federation of Women Voters. Cardell-Oliver was also the first woman to be suspended from the Legislative Assembly, which happened in 1942.

== Political career ==
In 1929, Cardell-Oliver's husband Arthur died, and she decided to move to Western Australia and to become the vice-president of the State branch of the Nationalist Party. She unsuccessfully stood for the federal seat of Fremantle against John Curtin in 1934. That year she also published her own book, Empire Unity or Red Asiatic Domination?, which outlined the economic measures that she thought would stop communism at the time.

In 1936 Florence was elected as the Nationalist member for Subiaco in the Western Australian Legislative Assembly, and in 1949 became the first Australian woman to attain full cabinet rank when she was made Minister for Health (having been previously an "Honorary" Minister for Supply and Shipping since 1947). Two years later she also became a member of the Select Committee on the Educational System in 1938. Florence was a political women and did much work with what she believed in. In 1939 she organized a campaign to go against free birth-control clinics. On 3 September 1941, she went against her own party, at the time, though unsuccessfully moved for the abolition of the death penalty.

On 1 April 1947 she was met with an honorary minister in the McLarty-Watts Liberal-Country Party government and on 5 January 1948 Florence became the honorary minister for supply and shipping. She retained these portfolios until the government was defeated in February 1953. Influenced by her experiences with undernourished children in London, she sponsored the Free Milk and Nutritional Council, and, as minister, introduced a free-milk scheme for Western Australian schoolchildren. Cardell-Oliver brought the State to the forefront of anti-tuberculosis campaigns by legislating for compulsory chest X-ray examinations. She later retired from her place as a Liberal Party She was, also a delegate to the British Commonwealth League, London.

She was a women's activist in Western Australia between 1936 and 1956 and a party organiser from 1936 to 1956.

== Titles ==
- Hon Minister for Supply and Shipping 5 January 1948 – 7 October 1949
- Hon Minister 1 April 1947 – 5 January 1948
- Western Australian Minister for Health, Supply and Shipping in (1949)
- The oldest person in Western Australia to attain full cabinet rank (1949)
- Minister for Health, Supply and Shipping 7 October 1949 – 3 February 1953
- Commander of the Order of the British Empire (1951)

== Memberships ==
- Karrakatta Club

== See also ==
- List of the first women holders of political offices in Oceania

Western Australian Legislative Assembly
Preceded by John Moloney	Member for Subiaco; 1936–1956	Succeeded by Percival Potter
Political offices
Preceded by Arthur Abbott	Minister for Health; 1949–1953	Succeeded by Emil Nulsen
Preceded by New ministry	Minister for Supply and Shipping (Honorary Minister before 1949); 1947–1953	Succeeded by Harry Strickland
