= J. P. Durack =

Australian lawyer (1888–1978)

John Peter William Durack, QC (1888–1978), often known as "Roaring Jack Durack" or "Black Jack Durack", was a prominent Australian lawyer and a member of the influential Durack dynasty of the Kimberley region of Western Australia.

== Early life and education ==
Durack was born to parents Jerry "Galway" Durack and Francis Neale. As a schoolboy attending Christian Brothers College on St George's Terrace in Perth, he witnessed a dramatic family tragedy when his father was killed. During the subsequent trial of the accused, Banjo, a young Durack ran along the banks of the Swan River from his school to the Supreme Court, famously calling out to the defendant, "Why did you shoot the Boss?", to which Banjo reportedly replied, "Oh Jack 1 Devil devil been jum up!"

== Legal career ==
After completing his education, Durack was articled to M. L. Moss, KC, and was admitted to the bar in August 1913, establishing his practice on Howard Street.

Durack had a long career in the law, eventually practicing at the firm Dwyer Durack well into his eighties during the 1970s. He served as president of the Law Society of Western Australia from 1943 to 1945. In June 1939, at the age of fifty, he was appointed a King's Counsel (QC). He was elevated to the Privy Council in London in 1950.

== Personal and family life ==
In 1922, Durack married Pleasance Rowe at the age of 36. The couple lived at "Strathmore," a historic Federation Queen Anne house on Chester Street in Subiaco built in 1905.

Outside of his legal practice, Durack was an avid horseman and served as president of the Hunt Club of Western Australia. He was known for riding horses through Kings Park on Wednesdays and keeping a stallion named "Midnight" hidden in the outbuildings of the historic home "Fairview".

Durack and Pleasance had children, including Peter Peter Durack, who followed in his father's legal footsteps as a 1948 Rhodes Scholar and later served as Attorney-General in Malcolm Fraser's federal government.

John Peter William Durack died in 1978.
