= Walter Richardson (politician) =

Australian politician

Member of the Legislative Assembly of Western Australia
- In office 12 March 1921 – 8 April 1933
- Preceded by: Samuel Brown
- Succeeded by: John Moloney
- Constituency: Subiaco

Personal details
- Born: 4 June 1871 Saddleworth, South Australia, Australia
- Died: 25 February 1959 (aged 87) Perth, Western Australia, Australia
- Party: Labor (to 1917); National Labor (1917–1924); Nationalist (from 1924)

Walter Richardson (4 June 1871 – 25 February 1959) was an Australian politician who was a member of the Legislative Assembly of Western Australia from 1921 to 1933, representing the seat of Subiaco.

Richardson was born in Saddleworth, South Australia, to Elizabeth (née Ramsay) and Henry Richardson. He came to Western Australia in 1896, and set up as a storekeeper. He was elected to the Subiaco Municipal Council in 1907, serving until 1912, and was later mayor of the municipality from 1920 to 1921. Richardson first contested a parliamentary election at the 1908 state election, standing unsuccessfully for the Labor Party in Subiaco. His opponent was Henry Daglish, a former Labor premier who had transferred to the Ministerialists. After the Labor Party split of 1916, Richardson joined the new National Labor Party. He served as the party's state secretary from 1920 to 1924, and recontested Subiaco for the party at the 1921 election, defeating both a Labor candidate and the sitting Nationalist member, Samuel Brown.

After the 1924 election, when the National Labor Party was dissolved, Richardson joined the Nationalists himself. He was re-elected at the 1930 election, but in the Labor landslide at the 1933 election lost his seat to John Moloney. Richardson attempted to reclaim his seat at the next two elections, but was unsuccessful on both occasions. He returned to the Subiaco Municipal Council, serving a second term as mayor (from 1936 to 1943), and made one last run for parliament at the 1956 election, at the age of 84. Richardson died in Perth in February 1959, aged 87. He had married Mary Ann O'Leary in 1896, with whom he had three sons.

Parliament of Western Australia
Preceded by Samuel Brown	Member for Subiaco; 1921–1933	Succeeded by John Moloney
