= Hugh Guthrie (Australian politician) =

Australian politician (1910–2000)

The Honourable Hugh Guthrie

18th Speaker of the Legislative Assembly of Western Australia
- In office 25 July 1968 – 20 February 1971
- Preceded by: John Hearman
- Succeeded by: Merv Toms

Member of the Legislative Assembly of Western Australia
- In office 21 March 1959 – 20 February 1971
- Preceded by: Percival Potter
- Succeeded by: Tom Dadour
- Constituency: Subiaco

Personal details
- Born: 2 July 1910 Laverton, Western Australia
- Died: 28 January 2000 (aged 89) Midland, Western Australia
- Party: Liberal

Hugh Norman Guthrie (2 July 1910 – 28 January 2000) was an Australian politician who was a Liberal Party member of the Legislative Assembly of Western Australia from 1959 to 1971, representing the seat of Subiaco. He served as Speaker of the Legislative Assembly from 1968 to 1971.

== Early life ==
Guthrie was born in the remote mining town of Laverton, to Annie (née Hutchinson) and Wemyss Manley Guthrie. He attended Hale School and the University of Western Australia, and after training as a lawyer was admitted to practise in 1933. Guthrie enlisted in the Second Australian Imperial Force in 1939, and saw service in the Middle East with the 2/16th Infantry Battalion. Later he was commissioned as an officer and served in New Guinea where he was wounded while serving at Sanananda with the 49th Infantry Battalion. Afterwards, he saw further service at Morotai and in Borneo, including a period in the headquarters of Lieutenant-General Sir Leslie Morshead, the commander of the II Corps. By the end of the war Guthrie had reached the rank of captain, and also been mentioned in dispatches. He was discharged in October 1945, and returned to the legal profession. Guthrie married June Cresswell Collins in 1946, with whom he had five children.

== Politics and later life ==
A member of the Nationalist Party from 1933 and a founding member of the Liberal Party in 1945, Guthrie was elected to parliament at the 1959 state election, defeating the sitting Labor member for Subiaco, Percival Potter. He increased his majority at the 1962 election. When John Hearman, the long-serving Speaker of the Legislative Assembly, was defeated in his seat at the 1968 election, Guthrie was elected to take his place. He served until his retirement at the 1971 election, which also saw the defeat of the Liberal government led by Sir David Brand. Outside of politics, Guthrie served as a director of a number of mining companies, and was also president of the Royal King's Park Tennis Club from 1950 to 1955 and president of the Western Australian Club from 1953 to 1955. He died in Midland in 2000, aged 89.

== See also ==
- Members of the Western Australian Legislative Assembly

Parliament of Western Australia
| Preceded by Percival Potter | Member for Subiaco; 1959–1971 | Succeeded by Tom Dadour |
| Preceded by John Hearman | Speaker of the Legislative Assembly; 1968–1971 | Succeeded by Merv Toms |
