= Percival Potter =

Australian politician

Member of the Legislative Assembly of Western Australia
- In office 7 April 1956 – 21 March 1959
- Preceded by: Florence Cardell-Oliver
- Succeeded by: Hugh Guthrie
- Constituency: Subiaco

Personal details
- Born: 4 September 1906 Hailsham, Sussex, England
- Died: 17 August 1975 (aged 68) Subiaco, Western Australia, Australia
- Party: Labor

Percival George Charles Potter (4 September 1906 – 17 August 1975) was an Australian politician who was a Labor Party member of the Legislative Assembly of Western Australia from 1956 to 1959, representing the seat of Subiaco.

Potter was born in Hailsham, Sussex, England, to Martha Charlotte (née Mayes) and Percival Potter. His family moved to Western Australia when he was a child. Potter left school at the age of 15, and subsequently worked as a clerk and book-keeper. He enlisted in the Australian Imperial Force in 1940, and during the war served in the Middle Eastern theatre with the 2/32nd Battalion, including in the Siege of Tobruk. Potter was invalided home in 1942, and returned to his old profession, working for various government departments. He also served as president of the local branch of the Returned Services League (RSL). Potter first ran for parliament at the 1947 state election, but lost to Florence Cardell-Oliver (the incumbent Liberal member) by a large margin. Following Cardell-Oliver's retirement, he recontested Subiaco at the 1956 election, and was narrowly elected. However, Potter's time in parliament was short, as Hugh Guthrie reclaimed the seat for the Liberal Party at the 1959 election. He attempted to regain Subiaco at the 1962 election, but was again defeated by Guthrie. Potter died in Perth in August 1975, aged 69. He had married twice, but had no children by either marriage.

Parliament of Western Australia
Preceded by Florence Cardell-Oliver	Member for Subiaco; 1956–1959	Succeeded by Hugh Guthrie
