= Peter Durack =

Australian politician (1926–2008)

The Honourable Peter Durack QC
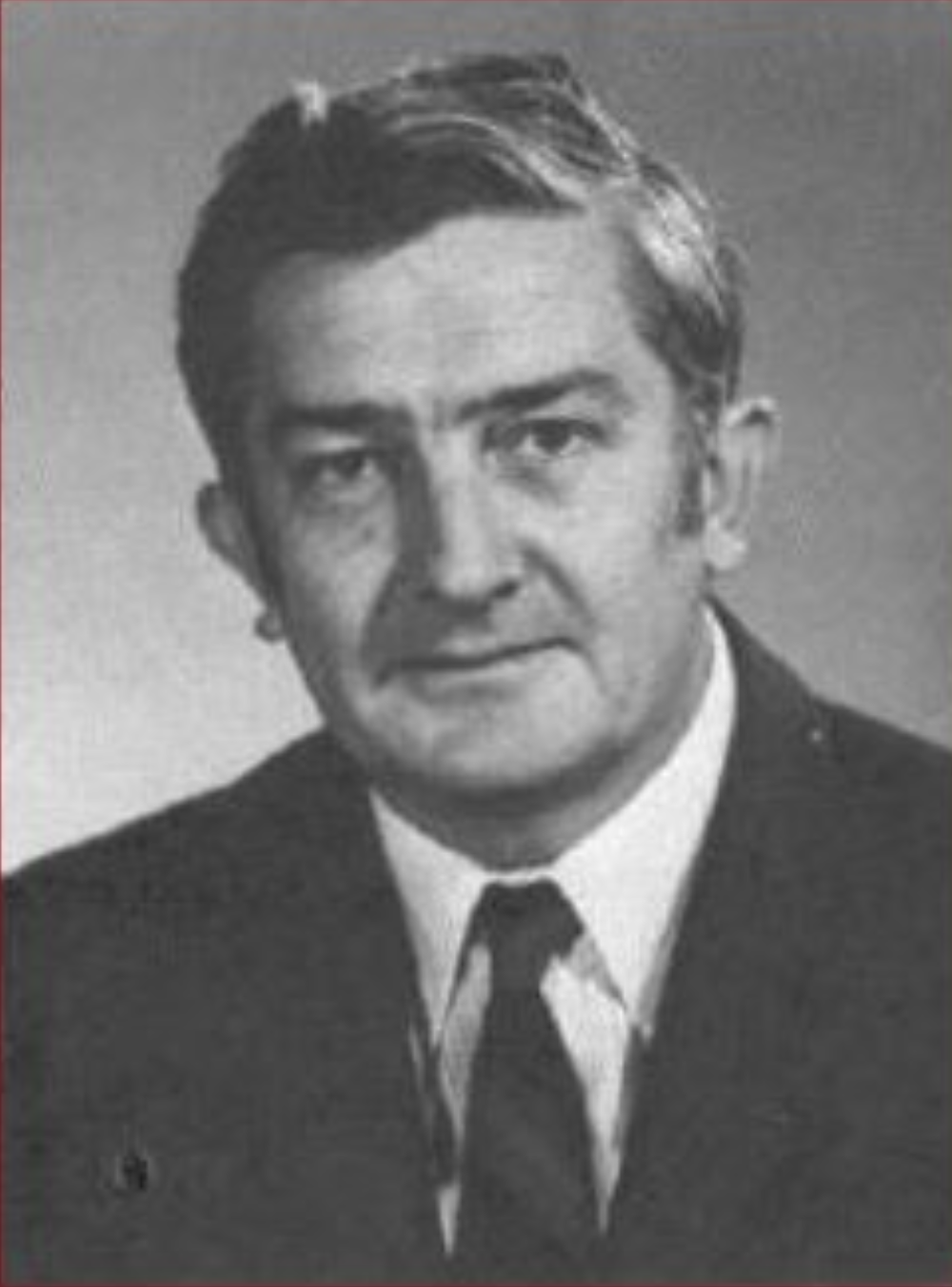
- Durack in the 1970s

Attorney-General of Australia
- In office 6 September 1977 – 11 March 1983
- Prime Minister: Malcolm Fraser
- Preceded by: Robert Ellicott
- Succeeded by: Gareth Evans

Senator for Western Australia
- In office 1 July 1971 – 30 June 1993

Member of the Western Australian Legislative Assembly
- In office 20 February 1965 – 23 March 1968
- Preceded by: Stan Heal
- Succeeded by: Terry Burke
- Constituency: Perth

Personal details
- Born: 20 October 1926 Perth, Western Australia, Australia
- Died: 13 July 2008 (aged 81) Perth, Western Australia, Australia
- Party: Liberal
- Spouse: Isabel Milne (m. 1953)
- Relations: J. P. Durack (father)
- Education: University of Western Australia; Lincoln College, Oxford
- Profession: Barrister

Peter Drew Durack, QC (20 October 1926– 13 July 2008) was an Australian politician, representing the Liberal Party. He rose to become Attorney-General of Australia.

He served in the Senate from 1 July 1971 to 30 June 1993. From 1987 to 1989, he was a joint Father of the Senate along with Arthur Gietzelt, and from 1989 until his retirement, he held that title alone.

== Early life ==
Durack was born on 20 October 1926 in Subiaco, Western Australia. He was the only child of Pleasance Sarah (née Rowe) and John Peter Durack. His father, a prominent barrister, was a member of the prominent Durack pastoralist family, being a grandson of Patrick Durack and nephew of Michael Durack.

Durack began his education at Anglican primary schools in Subiaco and West Perth, then went on to complete his secondary schooling at Christian Brothers' College, Perth, and Aquinas College. He matriculated to the University of Western Australia (UWA) in 1944, graduating Bachelor of Laws in 1948 and winning the prize for the top fourth-year law student. He was a co-founder of the UWA Liberal Club in 1945, a member of the university's debating team, president of the University of Western Australia Student Guild in 1948, and president of the National Union of Australian University Students from 1948 to 1949.

In 1949, Durack was awarded a Rhodes Scholarship to attend Lincoln College, Oxford, and complete the degree of Bachelor of Civil Law. He graduated with second-class honours and the top mark in equity, subsequently tutoring in law at Keble College. He was admitted to Gray's Inn as a barrister in 1953. After returning to Australia he was admitted to legal practice in 1954 and joined the firm of Dwyer Durack, which his father had co-founded with Walter Dwyer in 1915.

== State politics ==
At the 1965 state election, Durack was elected to the Western Australian Legislative Assembly. He defeated the incumbent Australian Labor Party (ALP) member Stan Heal in the seat of Perth by 207 votes.

In parliament, Durack chaired two select committees. He crossed the floor twice on environmental matters, once to support an opposition bill requiring parliamentary approval for reclamation of land from the Swan River, and once with other Liberals to oppose the demolition of the Barracks Arch. Durack lost his seat at the 1968 state election. He was subsequently elected state president of the Liberal Party, holding the post until 1971.

== Federal politics ==
Durack was an unsuccessful candidate for Liberal preselection at the 1969 Curtin by-election. He subsequently won one of the Senate seats at the 1970 Senate election, taking office on 1 July 1971.

He was Minister for Repatriation in the Fraser government from July to October 1976, when the title of the portfolio was changed to Minister for Veterans' Affairs. In 1977, he was appointed Attorney-General, serving in that office until the Fraser government's defeat in 1983. During that time he was responsible for the passage of the Freedom of Information Act 1982; he had introduced a private member's bill on the same subject in 1972.

He was deputy Leader of the Opposition in the Senate from 1983 to 1987, and 1990 to 1992.

In 1992, he failed to win preselection by his party for a further term, and his political career ended in June 1993.

The Commonwealth Law Courts Building on Victoria Avenue in Perth, Western Australia were named after Durack in 2005.

He died in Perth on 13 July 2008.

== Publications ==
Durack wrote several books, dealing with legal issues and the Mabo court case, with which he was involved during his time as Attorney-General.

- Evidence. ISBN 0-644-01371-0 / ISBN 0-644-01371-0
- The External Affairs Power ISBN 0-909536-47-3 / ISBN 0-909536-47-3
- Mabo and After (with Ron Brunton & Tony Rutherford). ISBN 0-909536-36-8 / ISBN 0-909536-36-8

== Family ==
Durack was a grandson of Kimberley pioneer Jeremiah Durack, who was an uncle of Michael Patrick Durack (1865–1950). He was therefore a cousin of authors Mary and Elizabeth Durack.

Durack was married to Isabel, with whom he had daughter Anne and son Philip.

Political offices
Preceded by Kevin Newman	Minister for Repatriation/Veterans' Affairs; 1976–1977	Succeeded by Victor Garland
Preceded by Robert Ellicott	Attorney-General; 1977–1983	Succeeded by Gareth Evans
Parliament of Australia
Preceded by Doug McClelland	Father of the Australian Senate; 1987–1993 with Arthur Gietzelt (1987–1989)	Succeeded by Mal Colston; Brian Harradine
