= Fred Chaney Sr. =

Australian politician

The Honourable Sir Fred Chaney KBE, AFC
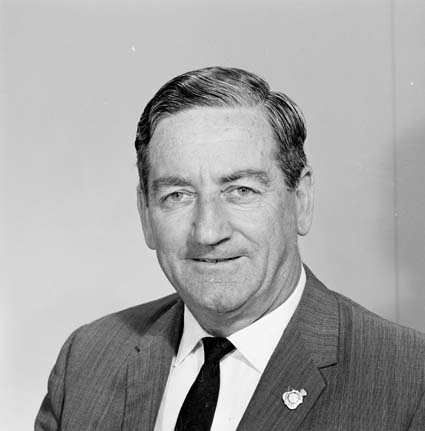

8th Administrator of the Northern Territory
- In office 4 March 1970 – 10 December 1973
- Governor-General: Sir Paul Hasluck
- Preceded by: Roger Dean
- Succeeded by: Jock Nelson

Minister for the Navy
- In office 4 March 1964 – 14 December 1966
- Prime Minister: Robert Menzies; Harold Holt
- Preceded by: Jim Forbes
- Succeeded by: Don Chipp

Member of the Australian Parliament for Perth
- In office 10 December 1955 – 25 October 1969
- Preceded by: Tom Burke
- Succeeded by: Joe Berinson

Lord Mayor of Perth
- In office 1978–1982
- Preceded by: Ernest Henry Lee-Steere
- Succeeded by: Mick Michael

Personal details
- Born: 20 October 1914 Fremantle, Western Australia
- Died: 17 December 2001 (aged 87)
- Party: Liberal Party of Australia
- Spouse: Mavis
- Children: Fred Chaney; Robin nee Chaney; Karen nee Chaney; Richard Chaney; Michael Chaney; John Chaney; Jillian née Chaney
- Occupation: Teacher

Military service
- Allegiance: Australia
- Branch/service: Royal Australian Air Force
- Years of service: 1941–1945
- Rank: Flight Lieutenant
- Battles/wars: Second World War; New Guinea campaign; Borneo campaign
- Awards: Air Force Cross

Sir Frederick Charles Chaney KBE, AFC (20 October 1914 – 17 December 2001) was an Australian politician. He served as a member of the House of Representatives from 1955 to 1969, as federal Minister for the Navy from 1964 to 1966, as Administrator of the Northern Territory from 1970 to 1973, and finally as Lord Mayor of Perth from 1978 to 1982.

== Early life ==
Chaney was born in Fremantle, Western Australia and educated in state and Catholic schools. As a result of his sporting ability he won a scholarship to attend Christian Brothers' College, Perth. He taught in state schools from 1932 and married Mavis, a fellow teacher, in 1938. In 1941, he enlisted in the Royal Australian Air Force as a pilot and flying instructor and served in Australia, New Guinea and Borneo and was awarded the Air Force Cross. Chaney and his wife had four sons (including Fred, a deputy leader of the Liberal Party; Michael, a businessman; and John, a judge) and three daughters.

== Politics ==
Chaney was elected at the 1955 election as the Liberal member for the Australian House of Representatives seat of Perth. He was appointed Minister for the Navy in Robert Menzies' December 1963 ministry, but not sworn in until 4 March 1964, due to the need to pass legislation to enlarge the ministry. In the interim, on 10 February 1964 the Melbourne–Voyager collision took place, and Chaney was responsible for dealing with its repercussions. He was not reappointed to Harold Holt's second ministry in December 1966 and he was defeated at the 1969 election by Labor candidate, Joe Berinson.

Chaney was the Administrator of the Northern Territory from 1970 to 1973 and was a strong advocate for Aboriginal land rights. He was Lord Mayor of Perth from 1978 to 1982. He was made a Commander of the Order of the British Empire (CBE) in 1970 and Knight Commander of the Order (KBE) in 1981.

== See also ==
- Political families of Australia

== Notes ==
Political offices
Preceded by Jim Forbes	Minister for the Navy; 1964–1966	Succeeded by Don Chipp
Parliament of Australia
Preceded by Tom Burke	Member for Perth; 1955–1969	Succeeded by Joe Berinson
Civic offices
Preceded by Ernest Henry Lee-Steere	Lord Mayor of Perth; 1978–1982	Succeeded by Mick Michael
