= Bartholomew James Stubbs =

Australian politician (1872–1917)

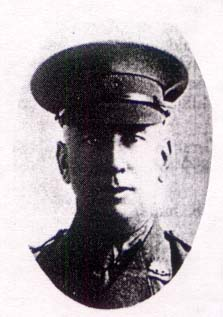

Member of Legislative Assembly, Western Australia
- In office 3 October 1911 – 26 September 1917
- Preceded by: Henry Daglish
- Succeeded by: Samuel McConnell Brown
- Constituency: Subiaco

Personal details
- Born: 31 May 1872 Bendigo, Victoria, Australia
- Died: 26 September 1917 (aged 45) Polygon Wood, Flanders, Belgium
- Party: Labor
- Spouse: Alice Maud Rewell (1864–1954)
- Children: Step children: Edith May Geddes, William Francis Geddes; Adopted: May Stephens
- Parent(s): William Stubbs, Catherine Stubbs (nee Farrell)

Military service
- Allegiance: Australia
- Branch/service: Australian Imperial Force
- Years of service: 1916–1917
- Rank: Second Lieutenant
- Unit: 51st Battalion
- Battles/wars: First World War; Battle of Polygon Wood

Bartholomew James Stubbs (31 May 1872 – 26 September 1917) was the first sitting member of the Western Australian Legislative Assembly to be killed in action while on military service for his country.

== Family background ==
Stubbs was born on 31 May 1872, second son of Irish Catholic parents William and Catherine Stubbs of Quarry Hill, Bendigo, Victoria. His father was for many years a mining manager on sites such as Johnson's Reef Extended mine.

After finishing school, Stubbs served an apprenticeship as a tailor in Victoria and was introduced to the Labor Party in 1890 when he first joined a trade union. In 1894, the 22-year-old moved to Perth, Western Australia. He was joined there later by younger brother Francis Michael Stubbs, an iron moulder who settled in the south-west township of Tambellup.

Stubbs ran a tailor shop in Subiaco, where he soon met Alice Rewell, a young widow to the infamous surveyor-turned-swindler William Goodwin Geddes Junior. The couple married on 11 November 1897 at St. Mary's Cathedral, Perth. Stubbs became stepfather to Alice's two children: William Frances Geddes (11) and Edith May Geddes (8). In 1905 they took in Alice's orphaned niece, five-year-old May Stephens.

A keen sportsman, Stubbs kept himself active by participating in various social events. He represented Perth tailors in several games of Australian Rules football as well as in running events during the annual Eight Hours Day (Labour Day) sports carnivals.

== Trade unionism ==
The focus of the young tailor's endeavours gradually shifted to improving the rights and conditions of workers. In 1896, he became a foundation member of the Perth Tailors Society and later held various offices within the organisation, including treasurer, vice-president and president, as it morphed into the Tailors Union and eventually the Amalgamated Tailors and Tailoresses Union.

For several years in the mid-1900s, Stubbs worked in Kalgoorlie and represented the tailors union on the Eastern Goldfields Trades and Labor Council. In due course he served as president of that Council. After returning to Perth in about 1907, Stubbs became a prominent leader of the labour movement. He represented the Perth Tailors and Tailoresses Union at various labour conferences and congresses and, by 1911, the year the Trades Hall was opened in Perth, he had become the president of the Metropolitan Council of the Australian Labour Federation.

== Political career ==
Stubbs's political career got off to a shaky start. His reputation as a leader of the Labour movement earned him preselection for the Subiaco electorate in the 1908 state elections. With 8 votes to 3, he was chosen ahead of Walter Richardson. However, the low voter turnout necessitated a controversial second preselection ballot, which resulted in Stubbs being deselected. In 1910, he sought election as a councillor for the Central Ward of the Subiaco Municipality but was unsuccessful.

The breakthrough Stubbs was looking for came in the state elections of 1911 when, by a mere 60 votes, he unseated his nemesis Henry Daglish, a former Laborite, former Premier and incumbent Minister of Works, who derogatorily referred to the Labour Party as "Stubbs & Co".

According to the Speaker of the House, Michael Troy, Stubbs soon proved to be "an able, earnest and conscientious parliamentarian", who among other things had fought to promote humanitarian social measures. He narrowly defeated Daglish again in the elections of 1914, this time by just 46 votes.

The press dubbed him "Subiaco Stubbs". This was to distinguish him from "Wagin Stubbs", another political opponent by the name of Sydney Stubbs, the member for Wagin, and former mayor of Claremont and Perth. Although they shared the same name and both hailed from Victoria, that's where the similarities ended. Their verbal attacks on each other in parliament left political commentators quite bemused.

The name Stubbs soon became synonymous with Subiaco for other reasons as he showed himself to be a resolute man of principle as well as an affable man of the people. Actively involved in the sporting and cultural affairs of the electorate, he was a delegate of the Subiaco Football Club on the committee of the West Australian Football League; he was patron of the Subiaco Junior Club; and on several occasions he took delight in declaring the cricket season open for Subiaco's best eleven. He was also a member of the Hibernian Australasian Catholic Benefit Society, and he and his wife Alice were lauded as generous benefactors to numerous local charities and welfare organisations, such as the Silver Chain, the Prison Gate Committee (a half-way house for prisoners), the Oddfellow's Orphanage, and St. Vincent's Foundling Home.

In times of chaos, Stubbs could quieten a larrikin crowd with his eloquence. At a political forum in Subiaco, a hostile and raucous mob kept drowning out the speakers, especially one of Stubbs's rivals. The Subiaco mayor and Henry Daglish had tried in vain to restore calm. But when Stubbs got up to speak an extraordinary thing occurred. One reporter said:

He was warmly cheered by those who had hooted and hissed before. He absolutely amazed the crowd by telling, and indeed convincing, them that they were on the wrong track. He insisted on fair play, and he was obeyed. Unfortunately Mr. Stubbs was the only man during the whole campaign with sufficient moral courage to command his friends to give his party opponents fair play.

In Parliament House, the oratory of Stubbs was humorously noted in the Daily News by the satirist "Artemus":

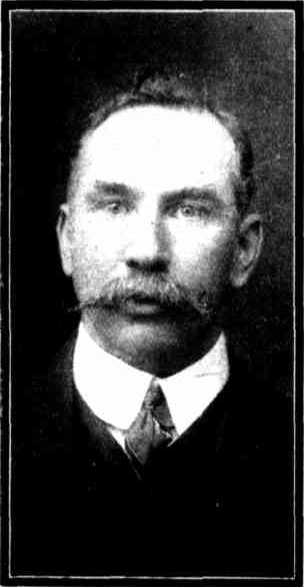
Jim Stubbs c. 1912

In the Legislative Assembly last night Mr. Dwyer said that Mr. B.J. Stubbs did not hold a monopoly of the wisdom of the House.

What blasphemy is this we hear?
What envy lies under that sneer?
Why everyone knows
That wherever he goes,
The speeches of Stubbs do most clearly disclose
A wisdom most deep and sincere!

Do you think that the wisdom of Stubbs,
Midst commonplace things ever grubs?
Not at all! On your life
In political strife
His wit is as keen as a razor-edged knife.
When some silly opponent he snubs.

Why, Wilson's a very plain bloke,
And Scaddan is merely a joke.
But hear Stubbs orate
In the heat of debate,
And you’re bound to confess that what's crammed in his plate
Would amaze the most erudite folk.

He's there with a quip and a jest
When members are feeling depressed,
And the hours flit away
Nimble-footed and gay,
When the House is entranced with Bartholomew J.
When he really 'lets loose' at his best.

Why each of 'em squirms in his seat,
When Bartholomew jumps to his feet;
His satirical style,
His acidulous smile,
And the scorpion-like lash that he wields all the while
Beats them all—with his epigrams neat.

For always their feelings he rubs,
Till they gall at his barb-headed snubs;
Just ruffle his ire
And the fat's in the fire,
And you'll never again want a chance to admire
The iridescent genius of Stubbs.

== First World War ==
With the outbreak of the First World War, Stubbs voiced his beliefs in the justice of the British Empire's cause and in mid-January 1916 was asked by the Subiaco Council to serve on a recruitment committee in response to a request from the War Council of Western Australia. On several occasions he appeared on recruiting platforms and seized every opportunity to encourage young men to enlist, but the Honourable Member for Subiaco preferred to lead by example and subsequently enlisted for active service in the Australian Imperial Force on 29 January 1916, at the age of 43. (In the early stages of the war, the eligible age for enlistment was 18 to 35; however, six months before Stubbs enlisted, the cut-off age was extended to 45.) When a reporter asked him why, he said "in my opinion middle-aged men without children, or other ties, or whose children have grown up, should volunteer before the young married men..." His step-daughter Edith echoed this sentiment. She said: "He came home and told me, and I said 'Why you, at your age?' He said 'To save your husband'". Stubbs understood the unwritten code that a young married man with children could be spared the sacrifice of war if another member of the family went in his place.

The people of Subiaco gave their elected representative a grand farewell. During the proceedings, the Premier, "Happy Jack" Scaddan, lauded Stubbs for his "energy, ability and loyalty" and promised him the warmest of welcomes when he came back. Stubbs said he found himself in a dilemma: no one had a right to gain financially when the nation was facing a crisis like the Great War, but he could not refuse his parliamentary salary because it was something which democrats had fought hard to obtain. His solution was to donate his entire parliamentary salary to charity throughout his time in the army.

The seasoned legislator began his military training at Blackboy Hill in Western Australia as a private but was soon promoted to the rank of sergeant. He then proceeded to the Royal Military College, Duntroon, where he was commissioned as a second lieutenant. On 23 December 1916, he embarked from Fremantle on HMAT Berrima in charge of the 8th Reinforcements of the 51st Battalion. One of the men under his charge was younger brother Private Francis Michael Stubbs.

Stubbs soon found himself on the Western Front but, as the sitting member for Subiaco, he could not escape all of his legislative responsibilities. Another state election was due on 29 September 1917, and there was keen interest back home to find out whether he would contest his seat again from afar. Some felt it would be "scarcely fair" for his electors if he were to continue representing them in absentia. Others pressured his wife to find out his intentions. In August, he sent a cablegram confirming that he would run again as the Labour candidate for Subiaco. When the nominations for the elections closed on 12 September 1917, Stubbs was subsequently returned unopposed for Subiaco.

With the election controversy resolved, Stubbs readied himself for front line action in Flanders and was soon in active combat in the Battle of Polygon Wood, about 800 metres south of the Belgian village of Zonnebeke (to the east of Ypres). His commanding officer, Lieutenant Colonel C. C. Ridley, spoke highly of his efforts: "He had endeared himself to everybody, officer and man alike, with whom he came in contact, and although not a young man, his zeal and energy would have done any youngster credit. His one desire was to take part in some actual fighting at the head of his men...". That opportunity came on the morning of 26 September 1917 when he took part in an attack that forced the enemy back several hundred metres. His Duntroon classmate Lieutenant J. V. Barnes, who had accompanied Stubbs throughout his time on the Western Front, described him as "a brave, capable and conscientious officer", adding that "the services he rendered during the battle were invaluable, as he was constantly collecting his men and leading them on". After achieving their objective, Barnes, Stubbs and a few of the men were assessing the situation and decided to take cover in a trench. As they went to do so, Stubbs was shot through the heart by a machine gun sniper. The 45-year-old lieutenant fell at their feet, saying "I'm done!" and died instantly.

Nineteen years later, his troops were still talking about what happened next:

There is some hearty cursing and a flow of real good Aussie language. One of the fellows slips out of his equipment, shoving a couple of clips of ammunition in his pocket, and with his rifle and bayonet disappears. The others continue at their work, taking care to keep under cover as much as possible. In the space of half an hour the hunter returns, a satisfied gleam in his eye. "Get him? Any trouble?" his mate asked eagerly. "Trouble? Bah!" He spits contemptuously. "The usual 'Kamerad.' I gave the —— 'Kamerad.'" The loss of a favourite officer was always sufficient to stir somebody up.

== Obituaries ==
A cablegram from Sir Newton Moore, Agent-General, delivered the news to Australia:

Mr. Stubbs was so familiarly and popularly known. Few men in public life within recent years could lay claim to such a wide circle of friends. His genial personality and unassuming manner had attached him to all who were privileged to know him, and the news of his death was to many a personal sorrow to be shared with his widow, who has received messages of condolence from all quarters today, and in which we join. In Parliament he was esteemed by members of the Labor Party as a loyal adherent to the cause in which he had laboured for so many years, and by his political opponents as a clean and manly fighter. His removal from the public life will leave the community poorer, but he has died as he lived—working and fighting in the interests of his fellows.

Condolences were also offered in the Western Australian Parliament by the Premier, the Hon. Henry Lefroy:

We all recognise the zealous manner in which the late Lieut. Stubbs attended to his duties in the House: but he heard a call that was greater than the call of party, he heard the call of King and country, and he left us to take up arms in defence of our hearths and homes. I am sure hon. members honour him for that: honour him for the feeling which prompted him to go forth. He has lost his life in the interests of home and country. For what greater thing could man lay down his life?

Parliamentary historians have concluded that in view of "Stubbs' demonstrated leadership capacities...Western Australian politics in all likelihood lost a man who would have gone on to high office".

== Memorials ==
Stubbs is commemorated on the Menin Gate Memorial in Belgium (Panel 29), and in Australia (Australian War Memorial, Panel 154; WA Parliament House, Perth; the Honour Avenues of Kings Park; and the Subiaco Roll of Honour).

Stubbs Terrace, which runs through the Perth suburbs of Daglish and Shenton Park, was named in his honour.
