= Electoral district of Subiaco =

Former electoral district of Perth, Western Australia

Subiaco Western Australia—Legislative Assembly
- State: Western Australia
- Dates current: 1901–1989
- Namesake: Subiaco

The electoral district of Subiaco was a Legislative Assembly electorate in the state of Western Australia. The district was named for the inner western Perth suburb of Subiaco, which fell within its borders. It was normally a safe seat for the Liberal Party and its predecessors, but was won on several occasions by Labor in landslide elections.

Subiaco was a new seat created under the Constitution Acts Amendment Act 1899, which took effect at the 1901 election, where it was won by Labor candidate Henry Daglish. In 1903, he became leader of the eight-member Parliamentary Labor Party, succeeding Robert Hastie, and in a want of confidence motion on 10 August 1904 following the 1904 election, he became premier at the head of a minority government supported by four independents. His government collapsed just over a year later, and Daglish resigned from the Labor Party. After accepting the post of Chairman of Committees of the Legislative Assembly in 1907, he joined the Ministerial faction of the party, later becoming Minister for Works.

He was unexpectedly defeated by a relatively unknown Labor candidate, Bartholomew James Stubbs, at the 1911 election. Stubbs held the seat until his death in overseas combat on 26 September 1917, following which a Nationalist candidate, Samuel Brown, won the seat at a by-election. He was defeated at the 1921 election by the National Labor candidate, Walter Richardson—the only occasion on which the party ever gained a seat it did not already hold at an election.

Richardson held the seat until the 1933 election, where in circumstances not dissimilar to 1911, he lost the seat to a Labor candidate. However, it was regained three years later for the Nationalists by Florence Cardell-Oliver, who went on to hold the seat for 20 years. On her retirement, Labor candidate Percival Potter won the seat at the 1956 election—a landslide for Labor—for a single term.

Hugh Guthrie held the seat until his retirement in 1971, and was followed by local GP Dr Tom Dadour. The seat's final member, elected after Dadour's retirement, was Carmen Lawrence, later to become Premier. The seat was abolished at the 1989 election and its voters were divided between the new seat of Glendalough and the existing seats of Floreat and Nedlands. While the namesake suburb was transferred to Nedlands, Lawrence transferred to Glendalough.

== Members for Subiaco ==
| Member | Party | Term |
|---|---|---|
| Henry Daglish | Labour | 1901–1905 |
| Henry Daglish | Independent Labour | 1905–1908 |
| Henry Daglish | Ministerial | 1908–1911 |
| Bartholomew Stubbs | Labor | 1911–1917 |
| Samuel Brown | Nationalist | 1917–1921 |
| Walter Richardson | National Labor | 1921–1925 |
| Walter Richardson | Nationalist | 1925–1933 |
| John Moloney | Labor | 1933–1936 |
| Florence Cardell-Oliver | Nationalist | 1936–1945 |
| Florence Cardell-Oliver | Liberal | 1945–1949 |
| Florence Cardell-Oliver | Liberal Country League | 1949–1956 |
| Percival Potter | Labor | 1956–1959 |
| Hugh Guthrie | Liberal Country League | 1959–1968 |
| Hugh Guthrie | Liberal | 1968–1971 |
| Dr Tom Dadour | Liberal | 1971–1984 |
| Dr Tom Dadour | Independent | 1984–1986 |
| Dr Carmen Lawrence | Labor | 1986–1989 |

== See also ==
- Subiaco, Western Australia
