= Celia Hammond (politician) =

Australian politician (born 1968)

Member of the Australian Parliament for Curtin
- In office 18 May 2019 – 21 May 2022
- Preceded by: Julie Bishop
- Succeeded by: Kate Chaney

Personal details
- Born: 22 November 1968 (age 57) Northam, Western Australia, Australia
- Party: Liberal
- Education: LLM, LLB, BJuris (Hons) University of Western Australia
- Occupation: Vice Chancellor University of Notre Dame Academic Lawyer

Celia Monica Hammond (born 22 November 1968) is an Australian former politician and former academic who was a member of the House of Representatives from the 2019 federal election to the 2022 federal election. She was a member of the Liberal Party and represented the Division of Curtin in Western Australia. She succeeded retiring Liberal MP Julie Bishop at the 2019 election and was defeated at the 2022 election by independent candidate Kate Chaney. Hammond previously served as the vice-chancellor of the University of Notre Dame Australia from 2008 to 2019.

== Early life ==
Hammond was born in Northam, Western Australia, and moved to the Perth suburb of City Beach at the age of 10. She studied law at the University of Western Australia, graduating in 1991. Her father Kevin Hammond was the Chief Judge of the District Court of Western Australia.

== Career ==
Hammond was admitted as a legal practitioner in 1992. She lectured at the University of Western Australia from 1994 to 1998, before accepting a position as a senior lecturer at the University of Notre Dame Australia's newly established Fremantle School of Law. She was subsequently promoted to professor and head of the law school, before being appointed vice-chancellor in 2008. She resigned the post in February 2019 to enter politics, although she had planned to retire later in the year.

== Politics ==
In March 2019, Hammond won Liberal preselection for the Division of Curtin, following the retirement of the sitting member Julie Bishop. She is considered to be more conservative than her predecessor. She retained the seat for the Liberals with a reduced majority.

In a Parliamentary speech during October 2021, Celia Hammond outlined her experiences suffering anorexia nervosa, over the course of a decade-long battle. She stated that, rather than seeking sympathy, she simply wanted to de-stigmatise the disease which affects so many young women and girls.

Hammond was defeated at the 2022 election by independent candidate Kate Chaney.

Parliament of Australia
Preceded by Julie Bishop	Member for Curtin; 2019–2022	Succeeded by Kate Chaney
