= John Moloney (Australian politician) =

Australian politician

John Daniel Moloney (10 May 1885 – 14 March 1942) was an Australian politician. He was the Labor member for Subiaco in the Western Australian Legislative Assembly from 1933 to 1936.
