= John Chaney (judge) =

Australian judge (born 1953)

John Anthony Chaney (born 26 February 1953) is a former justice of the Supreme Court of Western Australia and President of the Western Australian State Administrative Tribunal. He was also formerly a judge of the District Court of Western Australia.

He was educated at Aquinas College, Perth and the University of Western Australia. He graduated from UWA with a B.Juris in 1975 and LLB in 1976. He was a partner in the firm of Northmore Hale Davy & Leake, later Minter Ellison & Co, from 1980 to 1994. In July 1994 he commenced practice at the Independent Bar and joined the WA Bar Association. He was Convenor of the Law Society Education, Ethics and Professional Conduct Committee for many years, a Councillor of the Law Society of Western Australia and President of the Law Society in 1991. He has been a member of various Committees of the Law Council of Australia. He was a member of the Faculty of Law at the University of WA from 1988 to 1991.

He has been a member of the Murdoch Law School Board and various Committees of that Law School in the period from 1988 to 2000. He has also been a foundation member of the Notre Dame Law School since 1996 and a Director of the Australian Advocacy Institute Ltd since 1991. He was Chairman of the WA Municipal Association Taskforce on the Recommendations of the Royal Commission into the Commercial Activities of Government.

He has served as a Commissioner of the District Court in 1995 and 1996. He was appointed a Foundation Board Member of the WA Municipal Workcare Scheme in 1995. He has been the Acting Deputy Chairman of the Town Planning Appeal Tribunal since 1997 and the Editor of the Law Society's Brief magazine since March 1997. In the year 2000 Chaney was counsel assisting the Gunning Inquiry into matters related to complaints against Finance Brokers and the Finance Brokers' Board.
