= List of State Register of Heritage Places in the Shire of Peppermint Grove =

The State Register of Heritage Places is maintained by the Heritage Council of Western Australia. As of 2026, 178 places are heritage-listed in the Shire of Peppermint Grove, of which seven are on the State Register of Heritage Places.

== List ==
The Western Australian State Register of Heritage Places, as of 2026, lists the following seven state registered places within the Shire of Peppermint Grove:

Place name	Place #	Location	Suburb or town	Co-ordinates	Built	State registered	Notes	Photo
St Columba's Church and Hall	1927	Corner Keane & Venn Streets	Peppermint Grove	32°00′06″S 115°46′01″E	1896	28 June 1996	Also referred to as St Columba's Presbyterian Church; A rare example of a surviving church hall in Western Australia in the Federation Carpenter Gothic style	
Cottesloe Police Station (former)	1929	548-550 Stirling Highway	Peppermint Grove	32°00′11″S 115°45′37″E	1908	24 November 2000	Built in the Federation Queen Ann style	
Cottesloe Primary School & Cottesloe School for the Deaf & Hearing Impaired	1933	530 Stirling Highway	Peppermint Grove	32°00′07″S 115°45′40″E	1898	21 September 2001	Also referred to as Cottesloe State School; and Cottesloe Infant, Government School Cottesloe and Cottesloe Senior; Built in the Federation Arts and Crafts style	
Augustus Roe and Talbot Hobbs Boatshed	7005	Freshwater Bay, near Yacht Club	Peppermint Grove	32°00′04.3″S 115°46′21.9″E	1905		Also referred to as Boatshed No. 42 and Hobbs & Roe Boatshed; Part of the Freshwater Bay Boatsheds Precinct (17290)	
Septimus Burt Boatshed	15930	Freshwater Bay	Peppermint Grove	32°00′04.3″S 115°46′22.2″E	1905		Also referred to as Boatshed No.41 and Burt Boatshed; Part of the Freshwater Bay Boatsheds Precinct (17290)	
Doy Forrest Boatshed	15931	Freshwater Bay	Peppermint Grove	32°00′04.2″S 115°46′22.60″E	1913		Also referred to as Boatshed No.40, Forrest Boatshed	
Freshwater Bay Boatsheds	17290	Freshwater Bay	Peppermint Grove	32°00′04″S 115°46′22″E	1905	1 June 2012	Consists of the Roe & Hobbs, Burt and Forrest Boatsheds; The only cluster of boatsheds on the Swan River	

== Former places ==
The following place has been removed from the State Register of Heritage Places within the Shire of Peppermint Grove:

Place name	Place #	Street number	Street name	Suburb or town	Co-ordinates	Deregistered	Notes & former names	Photo
The Cliffe	1924	25	Bindaring Parade	Peppermint Grove	31.9937°S 115.7713°E	22 August 2008	Brisbane House	
