= List of State Register of Heritage Places in the Town of Claremont =

The State Register of Heritage Places is maintained by the Heritage Council of Western Australia. As of 2026, 856 places are heritage-listed in the Town of Claremont, of which 22 are on the State Register of Heritage Places.

== List ==
The Western Australian State Register of Heritage Places, as of 2026, lists the following 22 state registered places within the Town of Claremont:

Place name	Place #	Street number	Street name	Suburb or town	Co-ordinates	Notes & former names	Photo
Claremont Teachers College (former)	482	50	Goldsworthy Road	Claremont	31.987167°S 115.788128°E	Edith Cowan University Claremont Campus, UWA Claremont	
Claremont Post Office	483	36	Gugeri Street	Claremont	31.9813°S 115.7816°E	Claremont Post Office & quarters, Dome Cafe	
Claremont Council Offices & Surroundings	484	308	Stirling Highway	Claremont	31.983261°S 115.781809°E	Council Offices	
Claremont Railway Station	486	39	Gugeri Street	Claremont	31.980706°S 115.781415°E		
Congregational Hall & Congregational Church	487	262-264	Stirling Highway	Claremont	31.982589°S 115.785117°E		
St Aidan's Uniting Church and Hall	489	26	Princess Road	Claremont	31.986665°S 115.783848°E	Claremont Presbyterian Church, St Aidan's Presbyterian Church	
Christ Church and Rectory, Claremont	491	2 & 2A	Queenslea Drive	Claremont	31.984376°S 115.778509°E		
Coronado Hotel	492	206	Stirling Highway	Claremont	31.981796°S 115.790167°E	Highway Hotel (former)	
Pillar Box	495	256	Stirling Highway	Claremont	31.982433°S 115.785307°E	Site of Halfway Tree	
Claremont Museum	497	66	Victoria Avenue	Claremont	31.990393°S 115.787080°E	Freshwater Bay School	
Colwyn, Claremont	2080	50 & 50A	Victoria Avenue	Claremont	31.989709°S 115.785118°E	Colwyn	
Claremont School of Art Building	4097	7	Princess Road	Claremont	31.986166°S 115.782582°E	Former Claremont Infants School, Former State Primary School	
Claremont Primary School Precinct	7596		Bay View Terrace	Claremont	31.986259°S 115.782123°E	Freshwater Bay Primary School	
House & Former Milk Depot	7647	47	Claremont Crescent	Swanbourne	31.981162°S 115.775682°E	House, 47 Claremont Crescent	
Oldham Residence, Swanbourne	8091	11	Saladin Street	Swanbourne	31.981376°S 115.770231°E	Long-term residence of John Oldham	
ANZAC Cottage, Claremont	8094	16	Saunders Street	Claremont	31.979627°S 115.772730°E		
Barrett's House, Scotch College	11977	76	Shenton Road	Swanbourne	31.980695°S 115.772284°E	Collegiate House, Administration Building, Scotch College	
Christ Church Claremont Honour Roll	15684	Corner	Queenslea Drive & Stirling Highway	Claremont	31.984376°S 115.778509°E		
Claremont Teachers' College War Memorial	15686		Goldsworthy Road	Claremont	31.987167°S 115.788128°E		
Claremont Teachers' College Roll of Honour	15687		Goldsworthy Road	Claremont	31.987167°S 115.788128°E	In entrance hall of original college building	
Signal Cabin	26782	39	Gugeri Street	Claremont	31.980843°S 115.781142°E	Part of Claremont Railway Station (486)	
Middle Platform Shelter	26783	39	Gugeri Street	Claremont	31.980725°S 115.781427°E	Part of Claremont Railway Station (486)	
