= List of State Register of Heritage Places in the Town of Mosman Park =

The State Register of Heritage Places is maintained by the Heritage Council of Western Australia. As of 2026, 91 places are heritage-listed in the Town of Mosman Park, of which seven are on the State Register of Heritage Places.

== List ==
The Western Australian State Register of Heritage Places, as of 2026, lists the following seven state registered places within the Town of Mosman Park:

Place name	Place #	Location	Suburb or town	Co-ordinates	Built	State registered	Notes & former names	Photo
Leighton Battery	3247	Corner Stirling Highway & Boundary Road	Mosman Park	32°01′04″S 115°45′24″E	1942	27 August 1999	Buckland Hill Tunnels and Citizen Military Force Training Battery	
Memorial Hall	3832	12 Lochee Street	Mosman Park	32°00′34″S 115°45′49″E	1921	27 August 1999	Mosman Park Town Hall, Camelot Picture, Theatre, Road Boards Building, Buckland Hill	
St Luke's Anglican Church Group	4041	16 & 18 Monument Street & 1 Willis Street	Mosman Park	32°00′18″S 115°45′38″E	1897	27 August 1999	Consists of Church, Rectory & Alexandra Hall	
House at 2 Hill Terrace	24857	2 Hill Terrace	Mosman Park	32°00′17″S 115°46′11″E	1934	29 September 2015		
St Luke's Anglican Church	25075	16 Monument Street	Mosman Park	32°00′18″S 115°45′38″E			Part of St Luke's Anglican Church Group Precinct (4041)	
The Rectory	25078	1 Willis Street	Mosman Park	32°00′19″S 115°45′38″E			Part of St Luke's Anglican Church Group Precinct (4041)	
Alexandra Hall	25079	16 Monument Street	Mosman Park	32°00′17″S 115°45′38″E			Part of St Luke's Anglican Church Group Precinct (4041)	
