= Mosman Park railway station =

Railway station in Perth, Western Australia

Mosman Park
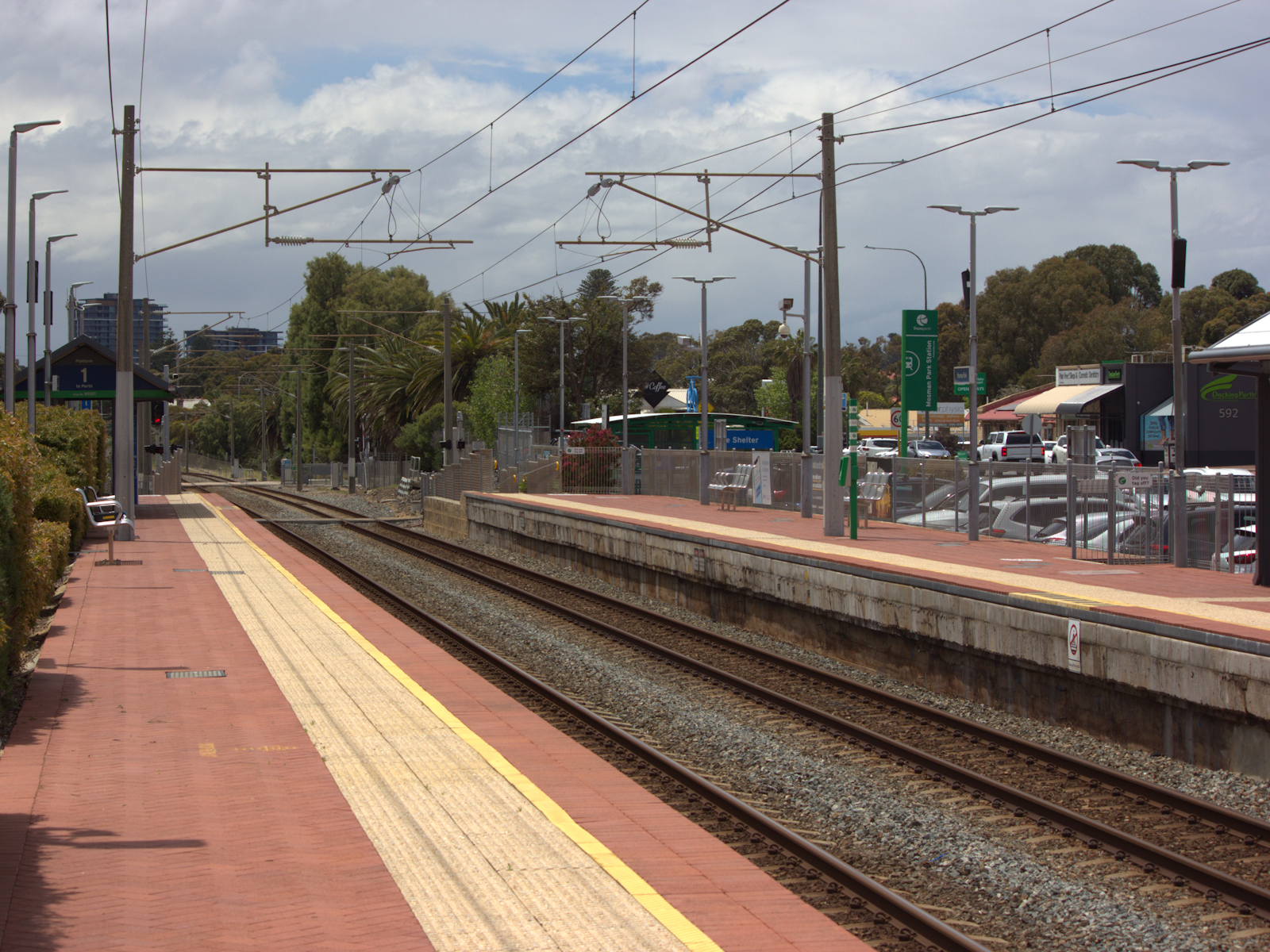
- Northbound view from Platform 1, October 2025

General information
- Location: Stirling Highway, Mosman Park; Australia
- Coordinates: 32°00′25″S 115°45′27″E
- Owner: Public Transport Authority
- Operator: Transperth
- Line: Fremantle line
- Distance: 13.5 kilometres (8.4 mi) from Perth
- Platforms: 2 side
- Tracks: 2

Construction
- Structure type: Ground

Other information
- Station code: FMP; 99321 (platform 1); 99322 (platform 2)
- Fare zone: 2

History
- Opened: 1 March 1894
- Former names: Buckland Hill; Cottesloe Beach

Passengers
- 2013-14: 159,850

Services
Preceding station	Transperth	Following station
Cottesloe towards Perth	Fremantle line	Victoria Street towards Fremantle
Location
- Location of Mosman Park railway station

Mosman Park railway station is a railway station on the Transperth network. It is located on the Fremantle line, 13.5 kilometres from Perth station serving the suburbs of Mosman Park and Cottesloe.

== History ==
Although the Eastern Railway opened on 1 March 1881, regular passenger services to Mosman Park station (then called Cottesloe Beach station) only commenced on 1 March 1894. In 1896 a station-master was appointed. The name of the station was changed to Buckland Hill in 1931 and to Mosman Park in 1937 to reflect changes of name of the local government area from Cottesloe Beach Road District to Buckland Hill Road District to Mosman Park Road District.

The station closed on 1 September 1979 along with the rest of the Fremantle line, re-opening on 29 July 1983 when services were restored. To the west of the station, a now lifted freight line ran from Cottesloe to the Leighton Marshalling Yard.

From 2034, Mosman Park station's platforms are planned to be extended to the north to accommodate six-car trains.

== Station location ==
Mosman Park station is located on the western edge of Mosman Park. The railway's right-of-way is between two important roads: Stirling Highway and Curtin Avenue. There is one access point to the eastbound end of the Perth-bound platform and two access points, at the eastbound end and centre, to the Fremantle-bound platform. There is a track crossing at grade level connecting the eastbound ends of the platforms.

== Services ==
Mosman Park station is served by Transperth Fremantle line services from Fremantle to Perth that continue through to Midland via the Midland line.

Mosman Park station saw 159,850 passengers in the 2013–14 financial year.

== Platforms ==
Mosman Park platform arrangement
Stop ID	Platform	Line	Service Pattern	Destination	Via	Notes
99321	1	Fremantle line	All stations	Perth		
99322	2	Fremantle line	All stations	Fremantle		

== Bus routes ==
Buses only arrive and depart on the Stirling Highway, next to the Perth-bound platform. Reaching buses from Curtin Avenue or platform two requires crossing the tracks at grade level.

Stop	Route	Destination / description	Notes
Stirling Highway (north bound)	998	CircleRoute clockwise via Stirling Highway	Limited stops
Stirling Highway (north bound)	906	Rail replacement service to Perth station	
Stirling Highway (south bound)	999	CircleRoute anti-clockwise via Stirling Highway	Limited stops
Stirling Highway (south bound)	906	Rail replacement service to Fremantle station	
