= Freshwater Bay (Western Australia) =

Bay in the Swan River, Western Australia

Coordinates: 31°59′51″S 115°46′50″E

Freshwater Bay is a bay of the Swan River, in metropolitan Perth, Western Australia. It is about 5 km (3.1 mi) upstream from the mouth of the river at Fremantle and is overlooked by the suburbs of Dalkeith, Claremont, Mosman Park and Peppermint Grove. Freshwater Bay was named after Freshwater Bay and Freshwater, Isle of Wight by Henry Charles Prinsep (1844–1922), who had a riverside family holiday cottage there, The Chine.

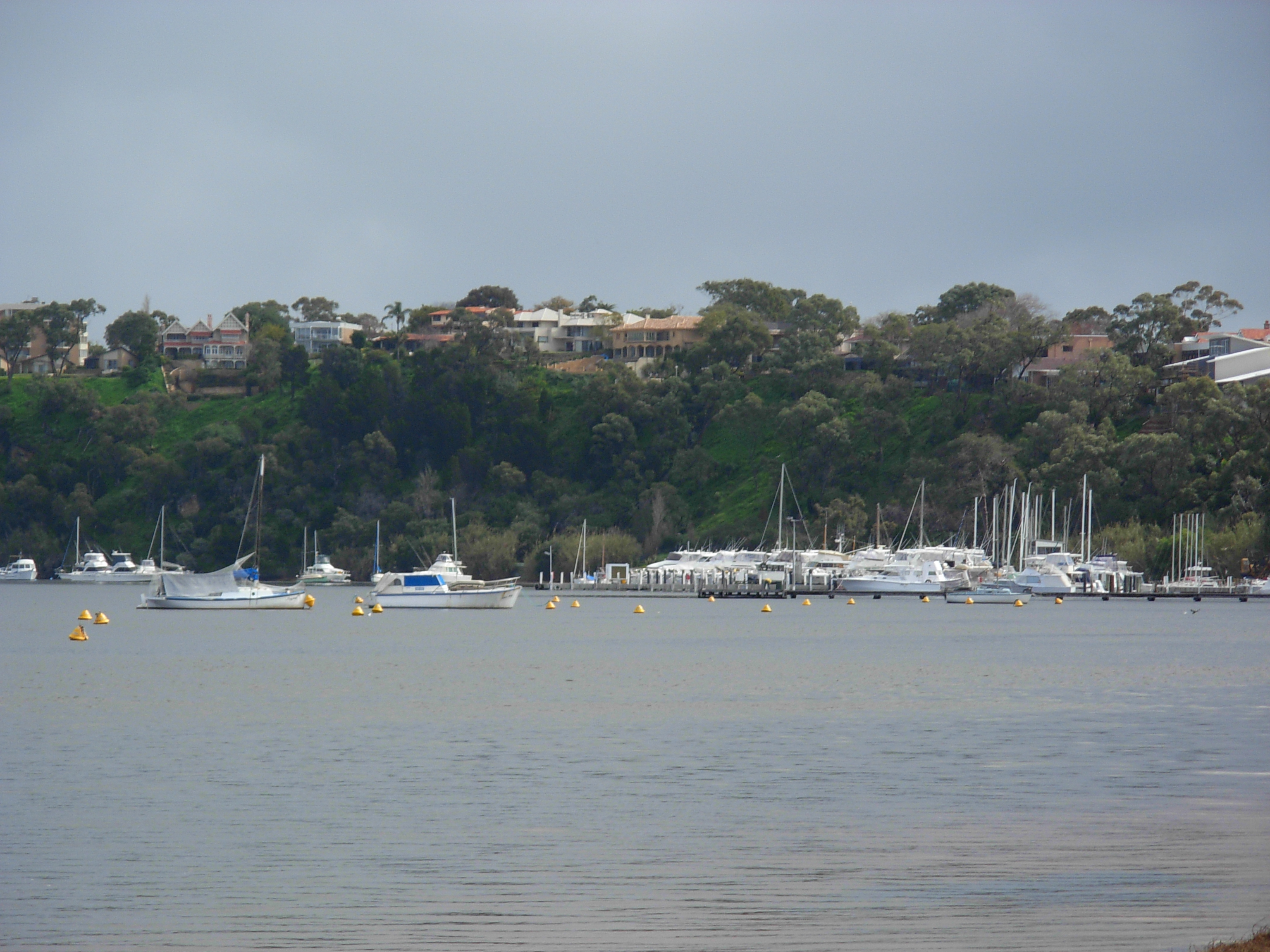
Freshwater Bay west side from Claremont foreshore

== Indigenous context ==
Before and after the arrival of Europeans, the bay had significance to local indigenous people.

== Features ==
Much of the bay's foreshore on the western and eastern sides are limestone cliffs. The head of the bay is the location of the Claremont foreshore. Other important features to the south are the sand spit at Point Walter and Point Resolution at the eastern end.

== Human interaction ==
Parts of Freshwater Bay are designated ski areas. Due to Point Walter's spit and the high surrounding limestone cliffs, the bay has relatively calm waters and is protected from winds, making the area suited for jet skiing, rowing, sailing and other water recreations.

Royal Freshwater Bay Yacht Club and Claremont Yacht Club are situated in the bay, both of which provide recreational boat mooring space and other club facilities as well as conducting races.

Christ Church Grammar School and Methodist Ladies' College are also situated atop the limestone cliffs along the northern section of the bay, often using it for rowing training and also kayaking for physical education classes.

== Environmental management ==
Extensive and long standing environmental impacts of suburban development around the bay have been reviewed following stricter environmental regulation.
