= Royal Freshwater Bay Yacht Club =

Yacht club in Perth, Western Australia

Coordinates: 32.002247°S 115.774225°E

- Burgee
- Short name: RFBYC
- Founded: 1896
- Location: Peppermint Grove, Western Australia
- Website: rfbyc.asn.au

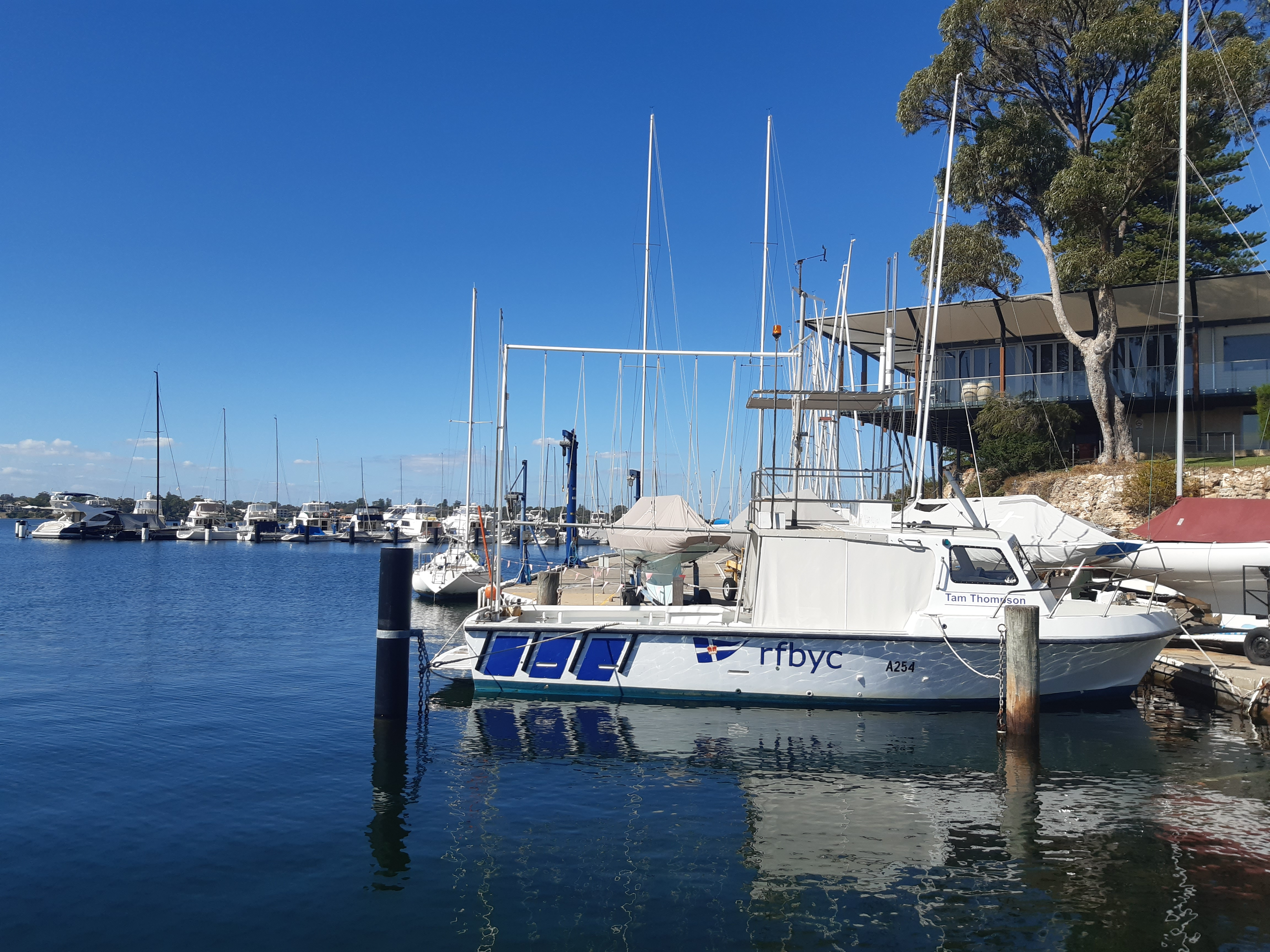
Royal Freshwater Bay Yacht Club, 2020

The Royal Freshwater Bay Yacht Club is a yacht club situated in Freshwater Bay on the Swan River in Peppermint Grove, a suburb of Perth, Western Australia.

The club was founded in 1896 by a group of friends including Aubrey Sherwood and Edward Keane, whose residence is now the RFBYC clubhouse. It is the second yacht club in Perth to be granted the royal charter, and it has established a strong but friendly rivalry with the other royal club, Royal Perth Yacht Club.

Each year the fleets of the two Royal clubs race, with the prize The Governor's Cup being presented by the Governor of Western Australia.

== See also ==
- List of International Council of Yacht Clubs members
