= Holden Mosman Park Plant =

Australian vehicle manufacturing factory

- Built: 1926
- Location: Mosman Park, Western Australia
- Industry: Motor vehicle assembly
- Owner: Holden
- Defunct: 1972

The Holden Mosman Park Plant was a vehicle assembly facility owned by General Motors Australia, later Holden on Buckland Avenue Mosman Park, Perth, Australia that operated from 1926 until 1972. Bodies delivered via train from Woodville in South Australia where mated to engines and transmissions manufactured in Fishermens Bend , Victoria for the Western Australian market

== History ==
The plant was opened by General Motors in 1926, closing in 1972. The last vehicle assembled was a Holden HQ sedan. The sports oval of the present-day Iona Junior School is on the site
