= Fremantle Eastern Bypass =

Proposed road in Perth, Western Australia

Fremantle Eastern Bypass Western Australia

General information
- Type: Highway
- Route number(s): Roe Highway

Location(s)
- Region: Perth

Highway system
- Highways in Australia; National Highway • Freeways in Australia; Highways in Western Australia

The Fremantle Eastern Bypass was a proposed bypass of Fremantle, Western Australia, which would have linked Stirling Highway with Roe Highway. A highway link from Roe Highway to Fremantle Port was proposed in the Metropolitan Region Scheme since the 1950s. A reservation for the bypass was included in the scheme in 1973. It was deleted at the request of the state government's Minister for Planning in 1992, reinstated in 1994 following a change of government, and once more deleted in 2004 after another change of government in 2001.

== History ==
In the 1950s, the Metropolitan Region Scheme planned for Roe Highway to continue westwards from its present terminus at Kwinana Freeway towards Fremantle, through South Fremantle along Marine Terrace and then north to connect with Stirling Highway and the Port of Fremantle. As part of the plan, in 1974 Stirling Highway was extended from its then terminus north of the Swan River southwards to Canning Highway.

A narrow 4-kilometre (2.5 mi) strip of land immediately south of this intersection was proclaimed for further road construction, but as it was not part of Gordon Stephenson's original plan it was occupied by housing built before the time of Stephenson. Over a period of approximately 20 years, Main Roads Western Australia procured most of the land in question for the future road. In 1985, the first 1-kilometre (0.62 mi) section of this road was constructed, which extended Stirling Highway southwards from Canning Highway to Leach Highway (known as High Street west of Carrington Street). The remaining 3-kilometre (1.9 mi) strip of land south of High Street then became known as the Fremantle Eastern Bypass.

At the southern end of the proposed Fremantle Eastern Bypass, an 8-kilometre (5.0 mi) east-west road reservation was proclaimed. This became known as Roe Highway stage 8. This land however was lightly built up and much of it remained as urban bushland throughout the late 20th century. The Roe Highway stage 8 reservation was intended to be the final link of a major urban ring-road, as originally envisioned by Stephenson.

However, there were problems with the proposed link, a product of the changes made by governments since Stephenson's original plan. This included the deletion of the original inner Fremantle section and the proclaiming of the Fremantle Eastern Bypass. Some residents of Fremantle strongly objected to the proposed 4-lane dual carriageway Fremantle Eastern Bypass, claiming it would divide the area, damage urban woodland and impact on 3 nearby schools. Also, the proposed Roe Highway stage 8 would cut between North Lake and Bibra Lake, a location considered of high environmental value as a wetlands. The Environmental Protection Authority in its report on the proposed Roe Highway Stage 8 confirmed the high conservation status of the Beeliar Wetlands and the negative impacts a highway would have on the wetlands.

With a change of state governments in 2001, the planned Fremantle Eastern Bypass / Roe Highway stage 8 was cancelled, with a commitment by the government to sell the land reserved for the Fremantle Eastern Bypass. In doing this, the government put forward a "6-point plan" to cope with the anticipated growth of heavy vehicle traffic in and out of the Port of Fremantle, which included plans for better usage of rail, more efficient usage of trucks and a new deepwater container port near Rockingham. As promised, the Fremantle Eastern Bypass land was sold for a total of $17 million. These funds were then spent on a new grade separated interchange at the intersection of Leach Highway and Orrong Road in Welshpool.

During the period for public submissions on the planned cancellation and sell-off, City of Melville residents opposed the plan as the proposed Fremantle Eastern Bypass / Roe Highway stage 8 would have removed most trucks from Leach Highway, which, although classified as a state highway, travels through a number of residential suburbs. On the other hand the move was generally supported by Fremantle residents including the local MP, and also those concerned by the potential negative impact the proposed road would have on Bibra Lake wetlands.

== See also ==
- Perth Freight Link
