= Cottesloe, Western Australia =

Cottesloe
- Suburb
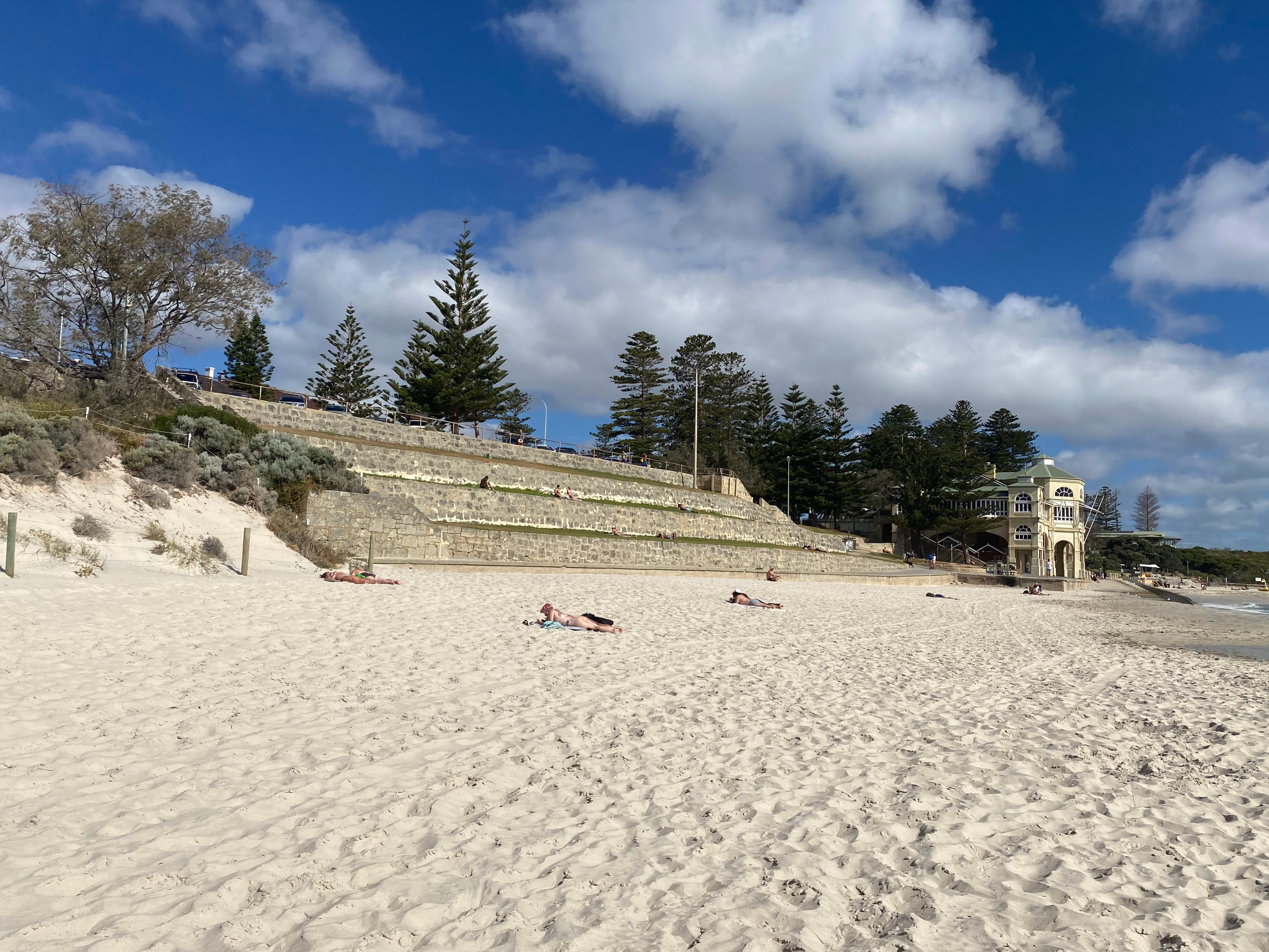
- View of Cottesloe Beach in summer 2023
- Interactive map of Cottesloe
- Coordinates: 31.993°S 115.757°E
- Country: Australia
- State: Western Australia
- City: Perth
- LGA: Town of Cottesloe
- Location: 11 km (6.8 mi) WSW of Perth CBD
- Established: 1870

Government
  - State electorate: Cottesloe
  - Federal division: Curtin

Area
  - Total: 3.856 km^{2} (1.489 sq mi)
- Elevation: 11 m (36 ft)

Population
  - Total: 7,750 (SAL 2021)
  - Density: 2,256.9/km^{2} (5,845/sq mi)
- Postcode: 6011
Suburbs around Cottesloe
Indian Ocean	Swanbourne	Claremont
Indian Ocean	Cottesloe	Peppermint Grove
Indian Ocean	Mosman Park	Mosman Park

Cottesloe is a western suburb of Perth, Western Australia, within the Town of Cottesloe. Cottesloe was named for Thomas Fremantle, 1st Baron Cottesloe, a prominent Tory politician and the brother of Admiral Sir Charles Fremantle, for whom the city of Fremantle was named. The nearby suburb of Swanbourne was named for the Fremantle family seat, Swanbourne House, in Swanbourne, Buckinghamshire.

Cottesloe was home to Australian Prime Minister John Curtin. The house he built still stands in Jarrad Street. It is now vested jointly in the National Trust of Australia (WA) and Curtin University.

== Geography ==
Cottesloe is a beach-side suburb of the city of Perth in Western Australia. It is located roughly halfway between Perth's central business district and the port of Fremantle. It is famous for its beaches, cafes and relaxed lifestyle.

Cottesloe is bounded by the Indian Ocean to the west; a line extending from Boundary Road, Mosman Park to the ocean to the south; the Perth-Fremantle Railway, Stirling Highway, Congdon Street and West Coast Highway to the east; and North Street to the north. Cottesloe is generally residential, with a significant shopping area located between Jarrad and Station streets adjacent to the Cottesloe railway station.

== Population ==
In the 2016 census, there were 7,375 people in Cottesloe, 68.8% of whom were born in Australia. The most common other countries of birth were England 8.6%, South Africa 1.8%, New Zealand 1.6% and United States of America 1.4%. 86.6% of people spoke only English at home. The most common responses for religion were no religion 36.4%, Anglican 22.6% and Catholic 19.3%.

Of the occupied private dwellings in Cottesloe, 66.9% were separate houses, 14.9% were semi-detached, row or terrace houses, townhouses etc., and 18.1% were flat or apartments.

Of the employed people in Cottesloe, 7.2% worked in hospitals (except psychiatric hospitals). Other major industries of employment included legal services 3.6% and general practice medical services 3.0%.

== Present day ==
Historically Cottesloe Beach and its panorama are reflections of the changes in the last 110 years of Perth's history. The photos and paintings of Cottesloe Beach that are either in collections or published, give evidence of the importance of beach-oriented activities in the Perth community. Cottesloe Beach is a popular place for beach cricket. An oceanway allows pedestrians and cyclists to move along the beaches.

It is one of Perth's most popular beaches and in 2009, Lonely Planet named Cottesloe Beach the world's second-best beach for families.

The Indiana Tea House, which overlooks Cottesloe Beach, is also an icon of the suburb, and in 2021 it was added to the Western Australia Heritage Register.

A new town planning scheme was approved for Cottesloe allowing developers to build to five storeys high along Marine Terrace with the Ocean Beach Hotel site allowed to reach eight storeys. The decision followed a two decade long debate.

A plan to build a skatepark in Cottesloe in 2020, had resulted in heated debate between locals and skateboarders.

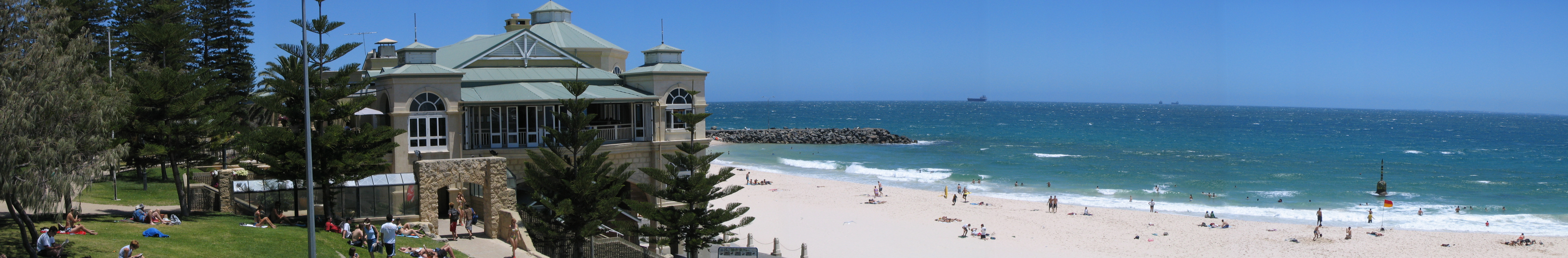
Cottesloe Beach and the iconic Indiana Tea House

== Transport ==
Cottesloe is served by Swanbourne, Grant Street, Cottesloe, Mosman Park and Victoria Street railway stations on the Fremantle line. Various bus routes along Stirling Highway and through the suburb's western and eastern sections link Cottesloe to Perth and Fremantle. All services are operated by the Public Transport Authority. Cottesloe is serviced by the 102 operated by Swan Transit.

=== Bus ===
- 102 Cottesloe Station to Claremont Station – serves Railway Street, Stirling Highway, Jarrad Street, Broome Street, Marine Parade, Eric Street, Grant Street and North Street
- 107 Fremantle Station to Claremont Station – serves Stirling Highway
- 998 Fremantle Station to Fremantle Station (limited stops) – CircleRoute clockwise, serves Stirling Highway
- 999 Fremantle Station to Fremantle Station (limited stops) – CircleRoute anti-clockwise, serves Stirling Highway

=== Rail ===
- Fremantle Line
  - Grant Street Station
  - Cottesloe Station
  - Mosman Park Station
  - Victoria Street Station

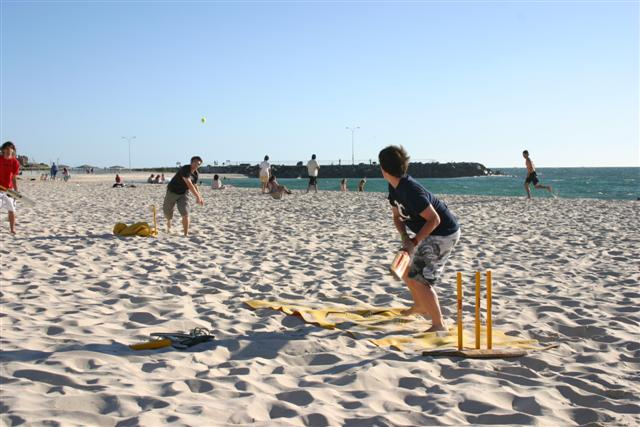
Beach cricket being played at Cottesloe Beach

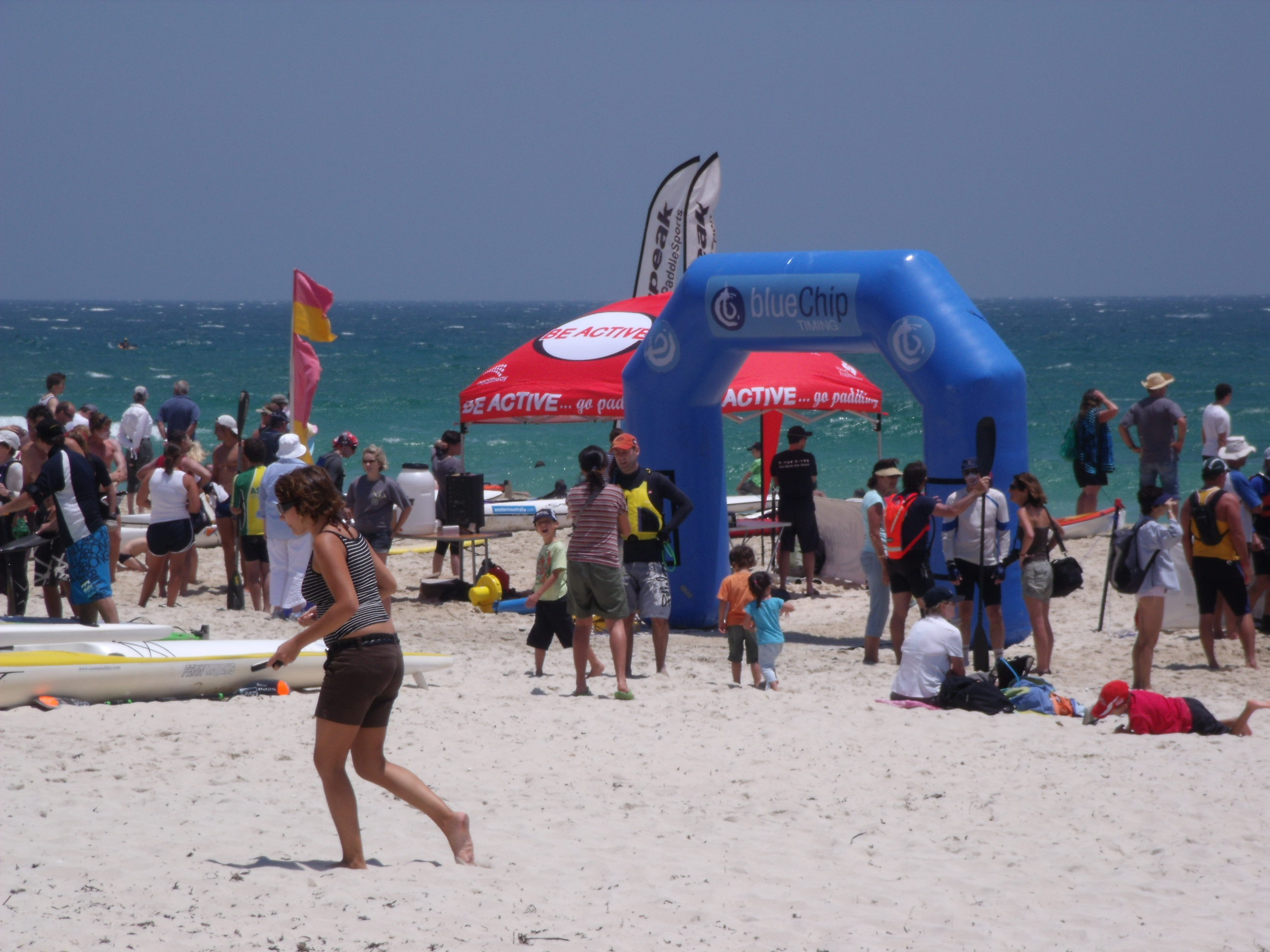
Kayaking competition at Cottesloe beach on a Western Australian Sunday

== Sport ==
Sport is a large part of the Cottesloe lifestyle, and the suburb is home to many sport clubs based in the area.

Club	Nickname	Sport	Location	Established	Major leagues
Cottesloe Tennis Club		Tennis	Cottesloe Tennis Club	1903	Men's State League Women's State League
Cottesloe Amateur Football Club	Roosters	Australian rules football	Cottesloe Oval	2014	Perth Football League
Cottesloe Junior Football Club	Magpies	Australian rules football	Cottesloe Oval	1973	
Cottesloe Surf Life Saving Club		Surf lifesaving	Cottesloe Beach	1909	
Sea View Golf Club		Golf	Sea View Golf Club	1931	

== Politics ==
From 1901 to 1968 and from 1974 to 1980 Cottesloe was part of the Fremantle electorate, since 1934 a notional Labor seat. Its most prominent member was wartime prime minister John Curtin, a Cottesloe resident.

Since 1980, it has been part of the federal division of Curtin. Curtin is regarded as a safe seat for the centre-right Liberal Party, which has held the seat continually since its inception, with the exception of a period from 1995 to 1998 when former Liberal member Allan Rocher held the seat as an independent and since 2022 when the current independent member Kate Chaney was elected. In the parliament of Western Australia, its Legislative Assembly electoral district is Cottesloe, held by Sandra Brewer.

== Notable residents ==
John Curtin, Prime Minister of Australia for much of World War II, was local federal member of parliament from 1928 to 1931 and 1934 to 1945. He lived in Cottesloe from 1918 until his death in office in 1945. Curtin's house in Jarrad Street is vested in the National Trust of Australia (WA) and Curtin University. During 2008 there was a suggestion that the house be relocated to the Curtin University grounds but the decision was made that the house remain in Cottesloe. In May 2009 the federal government announced that it would provide a grant of $580,000 to the National Trust to restore the house.

Kathleen Hope Barnes, a leading Australian nurse, was born here in 1909.

Claude de Bernales was a mining entrepreneur who in 1911 bought Attorney-General Richard Pennefather's 1898 Federation Queen Anne house, naming it Overton Lodge. In 1936 it was rebuilt as a 30-room Inter-war Spanish Mission style residence, designed by Bernard Evans. It was bought for £30,000 by the Town of Cottesloe in 1950 and renamed the Cottesloe War Memorial Town Hall and Civic Centre.

Former West Coast Eagles premiership player Chris Mainwaring lived in Cottesloe before his death on 1 October 2007.

== See also ==
- Le Fanu House
- Rottnest Channel Swim
