= AmpFest =

AmpFest - Clash of the Bands is an initiative of a West Australian Youth Advisory Council (YAC) and has been held in May each year since 2003 by five Councils, in the western suburbs of Perth, comprising the City of Nedlands, the Town of Claremont, the Town of Mosman Park, the City of Subiaco and the City of Vincent. The Town of Cambridge was one of the original organising Councils but withdrew and was replaced by the City of Nedlands. The project is designed to provide young Perth bands with an opportunity to further their skills in the music industry and provide them with a platform to play their music in a public arena, as well as provide other young people with the opportunity to attend free, local, live, all-ages entertainment.

The inaugural AmpFest was held in 2003 with 57 bands applying to take part and over 700 people attending the four heats that year. Since 2003, the format for each AmpFest has remained the same with the participating councils hosting the three heats and the final. Four bands play at each heat, with the winner going through to the final. A fourth wild card band is selected by the judges to participate in the final.

Since 2005 all twelve finalists get to record a track of their choice on the Best and Pressed CD which is distributed to music industry representatives throughout Western Australia. In 2007 the winner of the competition also received automatic entry into the semi-final of the Next Big Thing competition.

== 2003 ==
The 2003 finals were held in the Quarry Amphitheatre in Floreat on 29 March and the winner that year was a band called Tantrum.

== 2004 ==
The finals of the 2004 AmpFest were held on 12 June at the Ellie Eaton Pavilion, Claremont Showground, with the winning band, BulletChild.

== 2005 ==
In 2005 the winners were Mink Mussel Creek, with the finals being held again at the Ellie Eaton Pavilion on 11 June. Mink Mussel Creek went on to score second place at the Next Big Thing Competition 2006. In 2007 they were nominated twice at the WAMi awards, for 'Favourite Newcomer' and the industry-voted 'Most Promising New Act', winning the later. Second placed in 2005 were The Dee Dee Dums who went on to become Tame Impala.

== 2006 ==
The 2006 winners were The Bullet Holes with the finals held on 10 June at UWA Refectory, UWA Guild, Hackett Drive, Crawley. The band went on to be grand finalists in Next Big Thing Competition 2007 and state finalists in the National Campus Band Competition 2007.

== 2007 ==
Captains of King won the 2007 AmpFest, which was held on Saturday 9 June 2007 at Subiaco Church, Subiaco.

== 2008 ==
The winners of the 2008 event were Panama. The finals were held on Saturday 31 May 2008 once again at Subiaco Church.

== 2009 ==
AmpFest did not run in 2009.

== 2010 ==
The winners for 2010 were Goodnight Tiger, with Minute 36 in second, and Fat Jackal were third. The finals were held on Saturday 28 May at Subiaco Church.

== 2011 ==
The winners for 2011 were Sisters Dolls, with the runner-up being Sugarpuss.

== 2012 ==
The winners for 2012 were Dead Owls, with Lucas Jones second and New Animals in third place. The finals were held on Friday 7 September 2012 at the Regal Theatre in Subiaco.

== 2013 ==
AmpFest did not run in 2013.

== 2014 ==
The winners for 2014 were Indigo, with the runner up being Silver Hills.

== 2017 ==
AmpFest did not run in 2017.

== 2018 ==
AmpFest did not run in 2018.
