= Manners Hill Park =

Park in Peppermint Grove, Western Australia

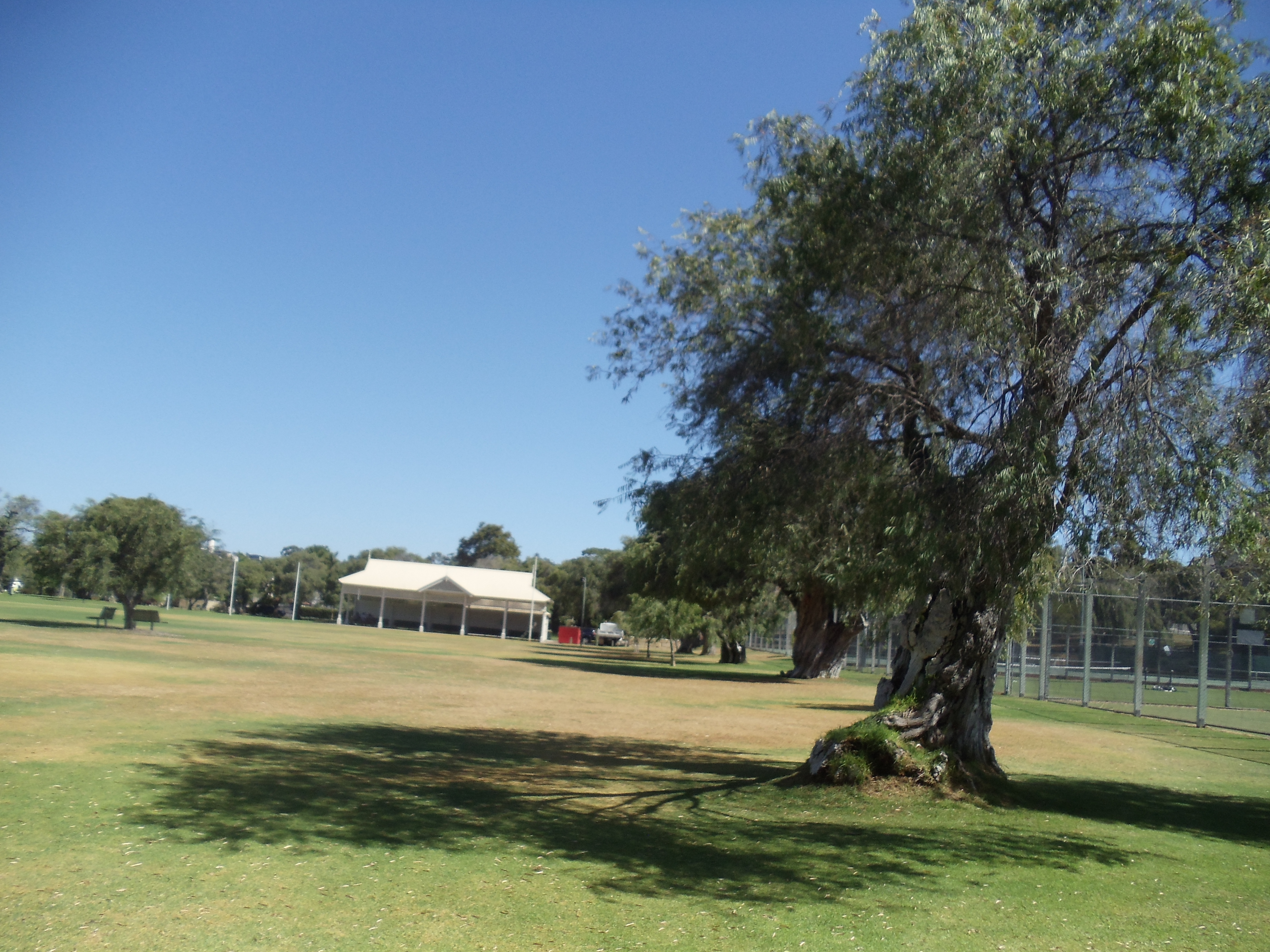
- View of Manners Hill Park showing the pavilion, peppermint trees and a tennis court
- Interactive map of Manners Hill Park
- Type: Municipal
- Location: Peppermint Grove, Western Australia, Australia
- Coordinates: 32.0025°S 115.7705°E

Manners Hill Park is a public park in Peppermint Grove, Western Australia. It is located in Peppermint Grove, an affluent suburb of Perth, and is surrounded by Johnston Street, Bay View Terrace, Keane Street and Lilla Street.

== History ==
The land was originally owned by Edward Keane, the Mayor of Perth from 1891 to 1892, who used it as a cow paddock. In 1903, architect Talbot Hobbs designed a pavilion which was built later that year. It obtained its current name in April 1934 when the Peppermint Grove Road Board named it in honour of its chairman and his sixteen years service to it, J. Manners Hill. Prior to that, it was known as Kean's Point Reserve.

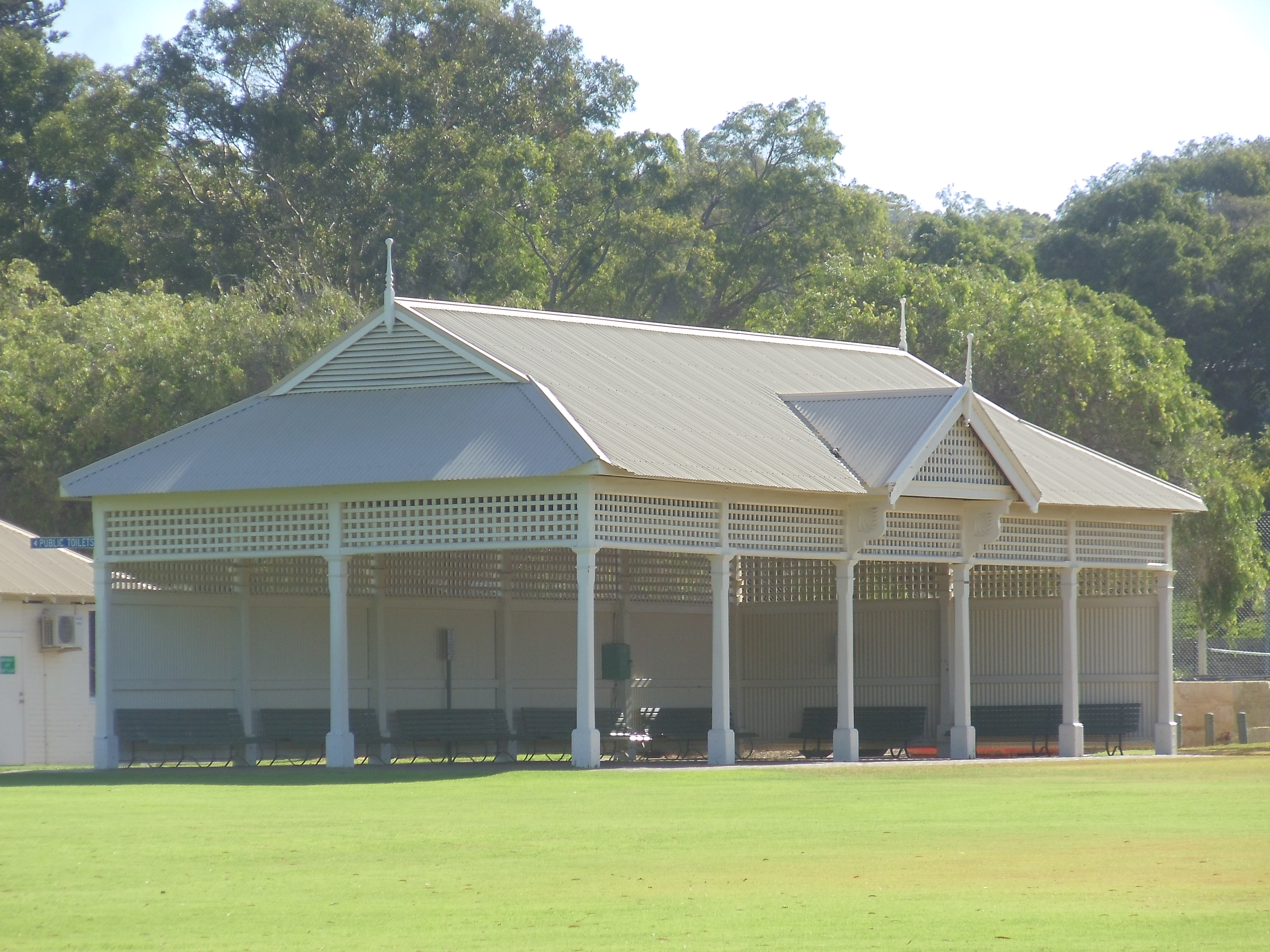
Pavilion designed by Talbot Hobbs

Later, several other amenities were added, such as a dog exercise area, public toilets, and the tennis courts of the Peppermint Grove Tennis Club.
