= Town of Cottesloe =

Coordinates: 31°59′35″S 115°45′25″E

- Local government area
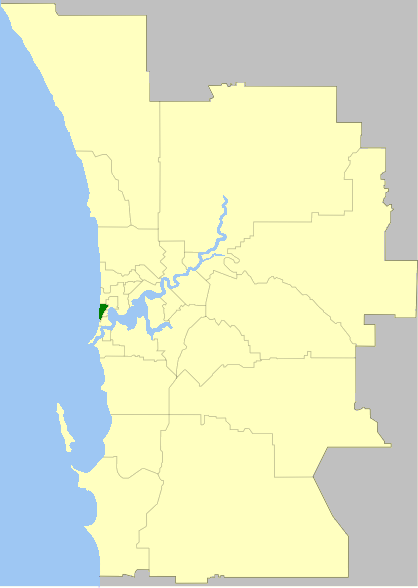
- The Town of Cottesloe within the Perth Metropolitan Area

- Interactive map of Town of Cottesloe
- Country: Australia
- State: Western Australia
- Region: West Metropolitan Perth
- Established: 1895
- Council seat: Cottesloe

Government
  - Mayor: Lorraine Young
  - State electorate: Cottesloe
  - Federal division: Curtin

Area
  - Total: 3.9 km^{2} (1.5 sq mi)

Population
  - Total: 7,970 (LGA 2021)
- Website: Town of Cottesloe
LGAs around Town of Cottesloe
	Nedlands	Claremont
Indian Ocean	Town of Cottesloe	Peppermint Grove
	Mosman Park

The Town of Cottesloe is a local government area in the western suburbs of Perth, the capital of Western Australia. It covers the suburb of the same name as well as a tiny portion of the suburb of Claremont. Cottesloe is located 11 kilometres (7 mi) west of Perth's central business district, covers an area of 3.9 square kilometres (1.5 sq mi), maintains 45.7 km of roads and had a population of approximately 7,500 as at the 2016 Census. Cottesloe is served by Swanbourne, Victoria Street, Grant Street and Cottesloe train stations, all operated through the Fremantle Railway Line. Various bus routes operate along Stirling Highway, enabling transport through the suburb's western and eastern precincts with Perth and Fremantle. All services are operated by the Public Transport Authority. The Town of Cottesloe's inclusion of walk and cycle paths enable it to be a walkable precinct.

== History ==
The Cottesloe Road District was created on 4 October 1895 and was granted municipal status as the Municipality of Cottesloe on 20 September 1907. In 1950 it bought Overton Lodge from Claude de Bernales and renamed it to the Cottesloe Memorial Town Hall and Civic Centre. On 1 July 1961, it became a Town following the enactment of the Local Government Act 1960.

== Wards ==
The town has been divided into 4 wards. The mayor is directly elected.

- Central Ward (2 councillors)
- East Ward (2 councillors)
- South Ward (2 councillors)
- North Ward (2 councillors)

== Suburbs ==
The suburb of Cottesloe is the only suburb within this local government area, but four short streets in the suburb of Claremont fall under its jurisdiction.

== Population ==
Historical population

Year	Pop.	±% p.a.
1911	2,704	—
1921	3,221	+1.76%
1933	3,628	+1.00%
1947	5,442	+2.94%
1954	6,199	+1.88%
1961	5,862	−0.80%
1966	5,793	−0.24%
1971	7,997	+6.66%
1976	7,366	−1.63%

Year	Pop.	±% p.a.
1981	6,750	−1.73%
1986	6,628	−0.36%
1991	7,205	+1.68%
1996	6,985	−0.62%
2001	6,823	−0.47%
2006	7,256	+1.24%
2011	7,605	+0.94%
2016	7,597	−0.02%
2021	7,970	+0.96%

== Heritage listed places ==
As of 2024, 430 places are heritage-listed in the Town of Cottesloe, of which 27 are on the State Register of Heritage Places, among them the Cottesloe Civic Centre and the Residence of John Curtin.

== Mayor ==
The current mayor of Cottesloe, as of October 2021 is Lorraine Young, who was formerly the Deputy Mayor. She had been Acting Mayor before she was elected Mayor, due to former Mayor Phil Angers having retired for health reasons. The current deputy mayor is Helen Sadler.
