= Claremont Post Office =

Historic site in Perth, Western Australia

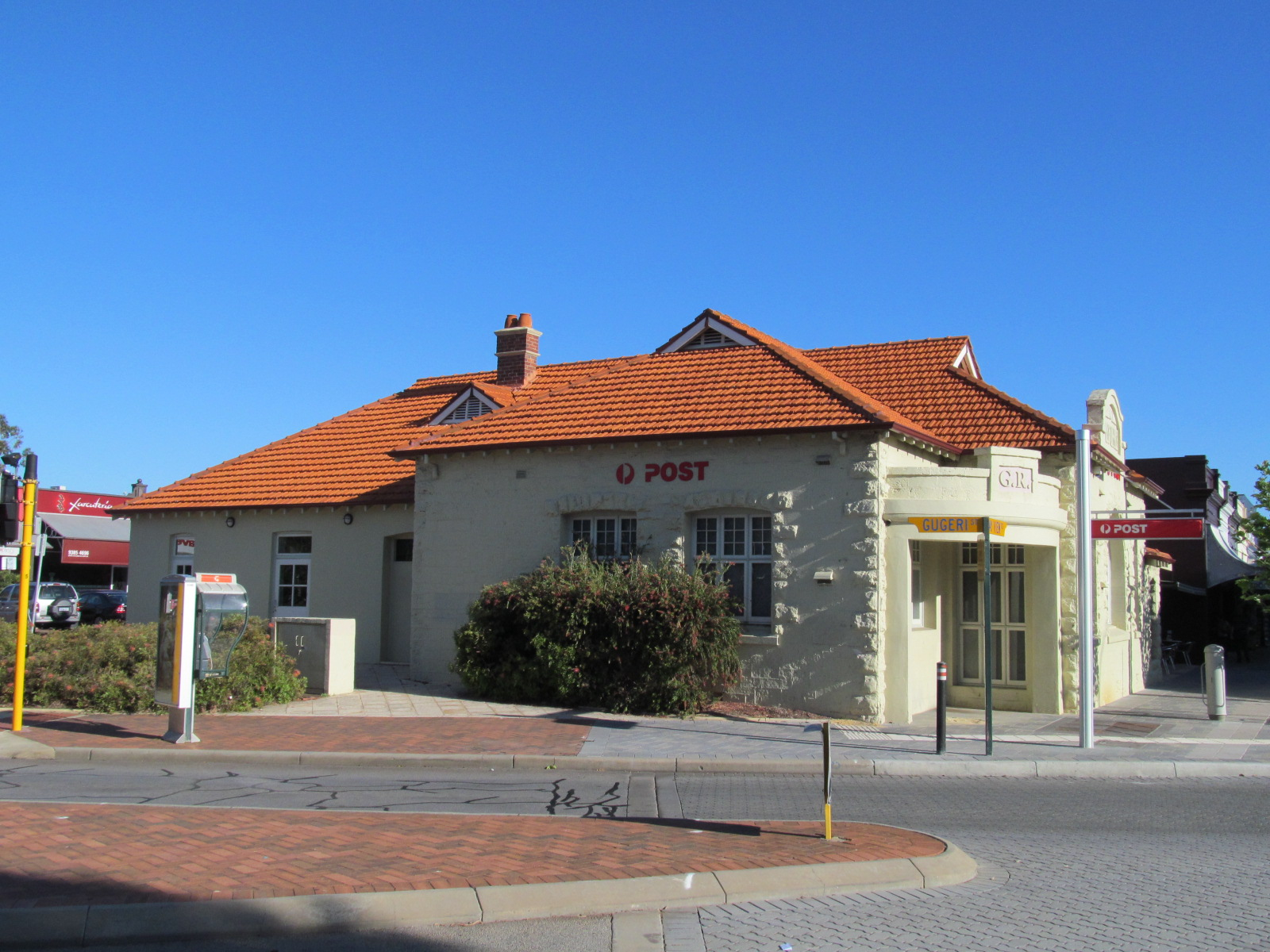

- Location within Western Australia
- 31.9813°S 115.7816°E
- Location: Bayview Terrace, Claremont, Western Australia, Australia

Commonwealth Heritage List
- Official name: Claremont Post Office
- Type: Listed place (Historic)
- Designated: 22 June 2004
- Reference no.: 105526

Western Australia Heritage Register
- Type: State Registered Place
- Designated: 22 December 2002
- Reference no.: 483

Claremont Post Office is a heritage-listed post office at Bayview Terrace, Claremont, Western Australia, Australia. It was added to the Australian Commonwealth Heritage List on 22 June 2004.

== History ==
In 1830, John Butler selected land in the Swan River Colony, including much of what subsequently became Peppermint Grove and Claremont. He developed a farm there and the area became known as Butler's Swamp. Initially the development of Claremont was from the farming activities undertaken by Butler and the fact that the area was a halfway point between Perth and Fremantle. A tree, on the Perth to Fremantle Road (now Stirling Highway) marked the halfway spot and was the site for the transfer of mail between Perth and Fremantle before the establishment of the Perth to Fremantle railway line in 1881. A posting box dated 1868 and only recently decommissioned, still marks the halfway spot in Stirling Highway. Following the opening of the railway the post was carried by train. In September 1883, a Postmistress was appointed. She operated from McMullens store in Gugeri Street between the present Post Office and Butler's Siding. With the opening of the railway the population of Claremont began to grow. Subdivisions in Claremont in the 1880s were mostly by investors, few of whom built on the land. These subdivisions provided land to a growing number of civil servants and other prominent members of the community who could commute readily to Perth by rail. According to Gregory, Claremont increasingly attracted a different class of people from that of the small upper class who had originally settled in Claremont to pursue farming activities.

In 1886 the building of a new Claremont railway station and Stationmaster's House, at the termination of what was to become Bay View Terrace, to accommodate increased traffic, confirmed the importance of the area near the line and set the pattern for the modern development of the Claremont town centre between the railway line and the Perth to Fremantle Road (Stirling Highway). In 1886, the Postmistress office moved closer to the railway and, by November 1888, was operating out of the store next to the Inn built on the western corner of Gugeri Street and Bay View Terrace, the site of the present Claremont Hotel (1888). A more intensive phase of subdivision of Claremont began in the 1890s with the expansion of population following gold discoveries. Amenities available in Claremont were attractive and, combined with easy access to transport to the city via the train, as well as the social image of Claremont, attracted new residents to the area. There were numerous subdivisions in the 1890s, with considerable building activity undertaken. The size of these lots were smaller than those of the 1880s, enabling people to move into the area in increased numbers.

In 1896, Claremont Post Office, incorporating a Telegraph Office and commodious Postmaster's residential quarters, was built, thus confirming Claremont's importance in the infrastructure of the postal service. It was built to the design of George Temple Poole of the Public Works Department, who was also a Claremont resident. The building was of rusticated stone and domestic in scale with picturesque asymmetrical massing and a shingled roof. It was a robust building but sympathetic to the style of the earlier Stationmaster's House (1886) opposite, which Poole had also designed. The tender for Claremont Post Office was let on 24 January 1896 to A. Davenport for 1,190 pounds with a condition that the building was to be completed by 24 April 1896. However it was not until 4 August 1896 that Claremont Post Office was officially opened.

George Temple Poole was an English born and trained architect and engineer who had arrived in Western Australia, in 1885, to take up the position of Superintendent of Public Works. Under various official titles, including Colonial Architect and Assistant Engineer-in-Chief, he headed the architectural section of the Public Works Department (PWD) from its infancy to its gold boom heyday in the 1890s. While he did not personally design and detail every building produced by the PWD in this period, the architectural character and building technology that was developed under his control owes much to his experience and vision. According to van Bremen, the level of Public Works design and construction established under Poole's direction set the standard for PWD construction up to World War One. Poole was also responsible for the design of the Railway Station and Stationmaster's House (1886) and the Police Station on Stirling Highway (1896, demolished).

By 1900, the railway provided an access point for not only the residents of Claremont but also for those of Swanbourne, Graylands, Dalkeith and Nedlands. Claremont Post Office played an important part in the postal services available to the residents of these districts as it was convenient to the railway station. On 1 July 1911, Claremont Post Office was granted official Australia Post status as a major suburban post office. Claremont Post Office has continued to be used as a post office since 1896.

The building was upgraded, in 1914, to a design by Hillson Beasley, the then Principal Architect of the PWD. Beasley's design changed the facade of the building considerably by emphasising its Romanesque features with a curved portico and also provided more room inside, with the demolition of some internal wall to accommodate a larger mail room and a bigger public area. The roof was also altered and the original shingles changed to Marseilles tiles. Since 1914, the building has been altered and extended, in the 1950s and the 1980s, to accommodate changing postal requirements and the residential accommodation has been taken over by postal functions, although the form of the rooms remains. Despite these changes, the external form of the 1914 building has changed little and continues to make a strong statement in the Claremont shopping area. In 1982, Australia Post proposed the demolition of Claremont Post Office. A public backlash ensued. A defence of Claremont Post Office was spearheaded by the Town Council, the Claremont Historical Society and a sympathetic local newspaper, the Claremont Nedlands Post. The debate lasted until early April 1983 when Australia Post said that it would retain the building and upgrade it to service modern postal requirements. The upgrading was finished in January 1985 at a cost of $265,000 and Claremont Post Office reopened on 29 January 1985.

In the period 1998–99 further works were undertaken to the fabric and finishes of the post office which accommodates the Dome coffee tenancy in the southern section, the former mail room completed in 1985. Claremont Post Office continues to be used as a post office. In 1998 the building was repainted externally and internally in heritage colours. Externally the scheme featured Indian Red, Beige, and Regency White for timber work and gutters with timber door and window frames in Grey Green and Regency White. The use of York Stone on external rendered areas and masonry was continued internally for joinery with Regency White for other surfaces.

== Description ==
Claremont Post Office is a rusticated stone building sited on the south-eastern corner of the intersection of Bay View Terrace and Gugeri Street, Claremont. Bay View Terrace runs almost due north and south and the front elevation of Claremont Post Office faces west.

Sited opposite the Railway Station and Stationmaster House (1886) and the Hotel (1888), Claremont Post Office defines the end of Bay View Terrace and creates a gateway to the main shopping precinct of Claremont. Claremont Post Office is a single storey building, in the Federation Romanesque style and features a large semi-circular window which addresses the western facade and a curved porch which addresses the corner. It was originally constructed in a domestic version of the Federation Romanesque style exhibiting a simple massing, shingled roof, square routed verandah posts, irregular roof form, projecting gable and rusticated stone work. The form was asymmetrical with an entrance porch on the Northern side of a large semi-circular window and a return verandah leading away from the southern side. Above the porch was a sign at roof level with the words 'Post Office'. In 1914, alterations to the building, under the direction of Hillson Beasley, removed the north-west porch and replaced it with a curved porch, which addressed the corner of Gugeri Street and Bay View Terrace and echoed the lines of the semi-circular window, thus increasing the sculptural quality of the facade. Above the semi-circular window a small pediment was added with the words 'Post Office' incorporated and a small porch, in rusticated stonework, added to the southern side. The roof line was also altered at this time by increasing the roof height and forming a prominent ridge line, incorporating ventilation and creating a gambrel effect. The original shingles were replaced by Marseilles tiles with decorative finials and ridge decorations emphasising the new lines. Claremont Post Office incorporated the Postmaster's residential quarters with the Post and Telegraph Office. The quarters were accessible both from the main rooms of the post office and the rear of the building, via separate entrance on the eastern elevation. This entrance way has a rusticated entrance arch, creating a shallow porch and is flanked by windows on either side. Both these windows are rusticated on the eastern facade, which creates, in combination with the recessed doorway, a pleasantly sculptural quality to that which is effectively a rear entrance. In the 1950s the open verandah on the northern elevation facing Gugeri Street, was modified with brick wall, timber windows and a tiled skillion roof. This area is now used as a store and for bikes. According to photographs, the stonework was painted, prior to 1972, but the strong form of the limestone facades and the terracotta tiled roof have survived.

In 1976, the roof tiles were removed and replaced with similar Marseilles styled terracotta tiles. The decorative finials were not replaced. Although further modifications were made to the place, in the 1980s, which altered the external form by adding new structures to the southern elevation of the building, these were done with minimal intrusion to the original fabric and in such a way as to be removable. Maintenance of the sub-floor structure was done to prevent bowing in the floor timbers. The original flooring was jarrah board 30 millimetres (1.2 in) thick, butt jointed together, whereas the 1914 alterations are of 25 millimetres (0.98 in) thick jarrah, butt jointed together. Subsequent additions (1950s, 1970s) have been on 25-millimetre (0.98 in) tongue and groove floor board. The 1983 work ensured there was minimal intrusion to the fabric of the building. The 1980s and 1998–99 changes did not significantly alter the 1914 structure and this can be easily identified.

Internally the form of the rooms is still evident although changes 1998–99 modified the functions and circulation. Works undertaken in the period 1998–99 included repainting of the external stone walls, new exposed piping on the north and eastern walls external surfaces, new landscaping to the Gugeri Street boundary including a line of trees, car parking spaces, closing of the original entrance and loss of the original Royal Cipher on the corner parapet. Details of these works were not confirmed by Australia Post. However, it was anticipated that a new Public and counter Australia Post space would be fitted out to standard Australia Post specifications. The modern air-conditioning, installed in the 1980s, is suspended from the ceilings which, with suspended fluorescent lighting is harsh and cluttered.

A passage runs north–south across the building from Gugeri Street to the new mail room on the south. Opening from this on the east side is a room which has had the western wall removed and is now used for clerical purposes. It retains a fireplace in the corner. The room has a timber dado running around the walls, it is not thought to be original. Also opening from the corridor is another corridor running east–west to the rear of the property, through what was once the Postmaster's Quarters. Changes effected in the 1980s to this area included the provision of staff toilets, restroom and an amenities area in addition to a space dedicated to clerical work. These areas were further adapted in 1999 by the removal of walls to create a POB Sorting area with small areas retained for amenities and toilets. Little of the original interiors remain.

At the southern termination of the north–south corridor is the new mail room constructed in 1980 on the southern side of the delivery bay. Between the wall of the new mailroom and the southern elevation of the 1914 structure, is a light well with a curved steel tube carport bridging the space. The mail room is a large open, modern space which is free-standing and which now appears to house the DOME coffee shop as a tenancy. This faces Bay View Terrace and is set back from the building line. A new verandah was built over the extension and the supporting pillars rusticated to match the stonework of the original. A decorative pediment, echoing in design, Beasley's pediment above Poole's semi-circular window was added with the words 'Claremont 6010'. The space between the postal boxes and the adjacent shops was turned into a pedestrian right of way through to the street behind Claremont Post Office. This has curbed steel tubing and translucent roofing. Due to the sympathetic treatment of the facade of the extension, Claremont Post Office remains a strongly modelled and well balanced public building at an important gateway to Bay View Terrace.

== Heritage listing ==
Claremont Post Office was listed on the Australian Commonwealth Heritage List on 22 June 2004.

Constructed in 1896, Claremont Post Office is important for its association with the development of Claremont following the population growth during the late nineteenth century gold boom. The suitability of Claremont as a commuter suburb serviced by rail is reflected in the post office being constructed directly opposite the railway station.

Claremont Post Office is primarily significant for its architectural and streetscape values. It was designed by George Temple Poole in a Federation Arts and Crafts style and features rusticated stonework, expressed parapet and bold fenestration. It is prominently located on a corner of the principal shopping street and has important stylistic references to the nearby station master's house, the school and the former police station.
