= Peppermint Grove =

- Suburb
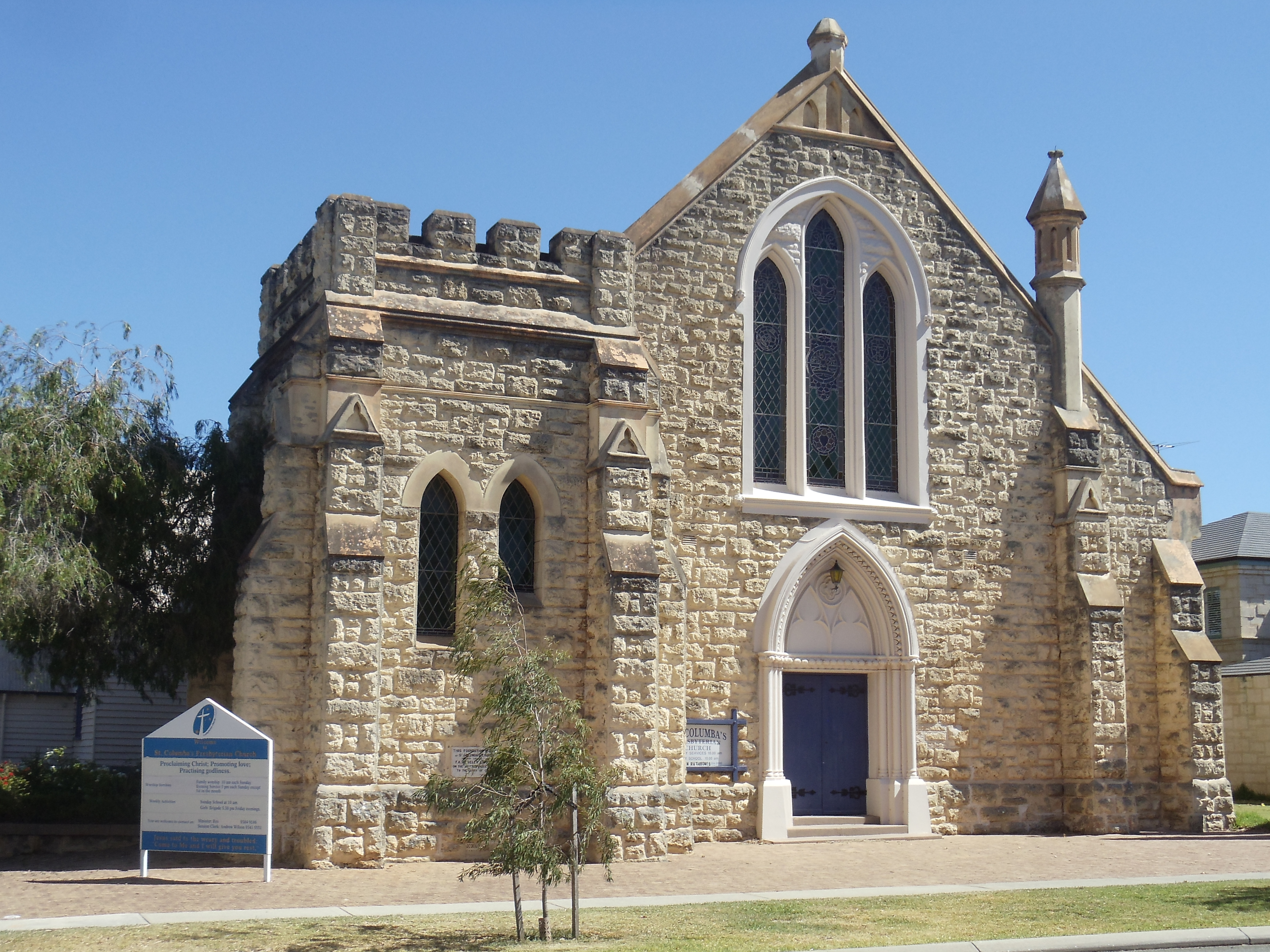
- Front of St Columba's Presbyterian Church, Peppermint Grove
- Coordinates: 32°00′00″S 115°46′00″E
- Country: Australia
- State: Western Australia
- City: Perth
- LGA: Shire of Peppermint Grove
- Location: 12 km (7.5 mi) SW of Perth CBD
- Established: 1830s

Government
  - State electorate: Cottesloe
  - Federal division: Curtin

Area
  - Total: 1.1 km^{2} (0.42 sq mi)
- Postcode: 6011
Suburbs around Peppermint Grove
	Claremont
Cottesloe	Peppermint Grove	(Freshwater Bay)
	Mosman Park

Peppermint Grove is a western suburb of Perth, Western Australia on the north bank of the Swan River at Freshwater Bay. Its local government area, the smallest in the country, is the Shire of Peppermint Grove. The suburb was named after the Swan River peppermint trees (Agonis flexuosa) lining many streets. The suburb has long been associated with Western Australia's wealthiest and oldest families. Their prosperity is reflected in the many historical houses in the area, such as The Cliffe and the Federation Queen Anne style St Just. Colin Barnett, a former Premier of Western Australia, dubbed the suburb "Monaco of WA" due to its small size and concentration of wealth. It is also known as "millionaire’s row" and had the highest income of any suburb in Australia in 2022.

== History ==
At the time of European settlement and for some years after, the area was thickly wooded with tuart, jarrah, red gum, banksia as well as the peppermint trees which gave the suburb its name.

In 1830, John Butler, an innkeeper, was given a grant of 250 acres (1 km²) on Freshwater Bay, after unsuccessfully attempting to secure land at Claremont. From this location, he operated "The Bush Inn", a stone house he had built and rigged out with native mahogany, commonly known as jarrah. After a series of arguments with the colonial authorities of the day, Butler left for Sydney in October 1835, but did not dispose of the property.

After the death of Butler's wife, Ann, in 1886, a syndicate of businessmen, including Alexander Forrest and George Leake, persuaded Butler's children to sell the land. In 1891, it was subdivided and lots were sold for £7 to £12 each. Two of the earliest residents were Edward Vivien Harvey Keane, Lord Mayor of Perth, and John Forrest, Premier of Western Australia. Four years later, residents got a road board, later to become the Peppermint Grove Shire Council – to this day, the smallest in Australia, at 1.1 km^{2} (0.42 sq mi).

== Geography ==
Peppermint Grove is situated between Stirling Highway on the west and the Swan River at Freshwater Bay to the east. It spans six blocks, with its main streets named after the first post-subdivision residents of the suburb – McNeil, Forrest, Leake, Irvine, Keane, Johnston and Venn.

At the 2016 Australian census, Peppermint Grove had a high-income, mostly British Isles-derived population of 1,636 people living in 613 dwellings. 58% of the residents were female. The ABS noted that 64% of the suburb's workforce were professionals or managers (five percentage points less than the 2011 Census).

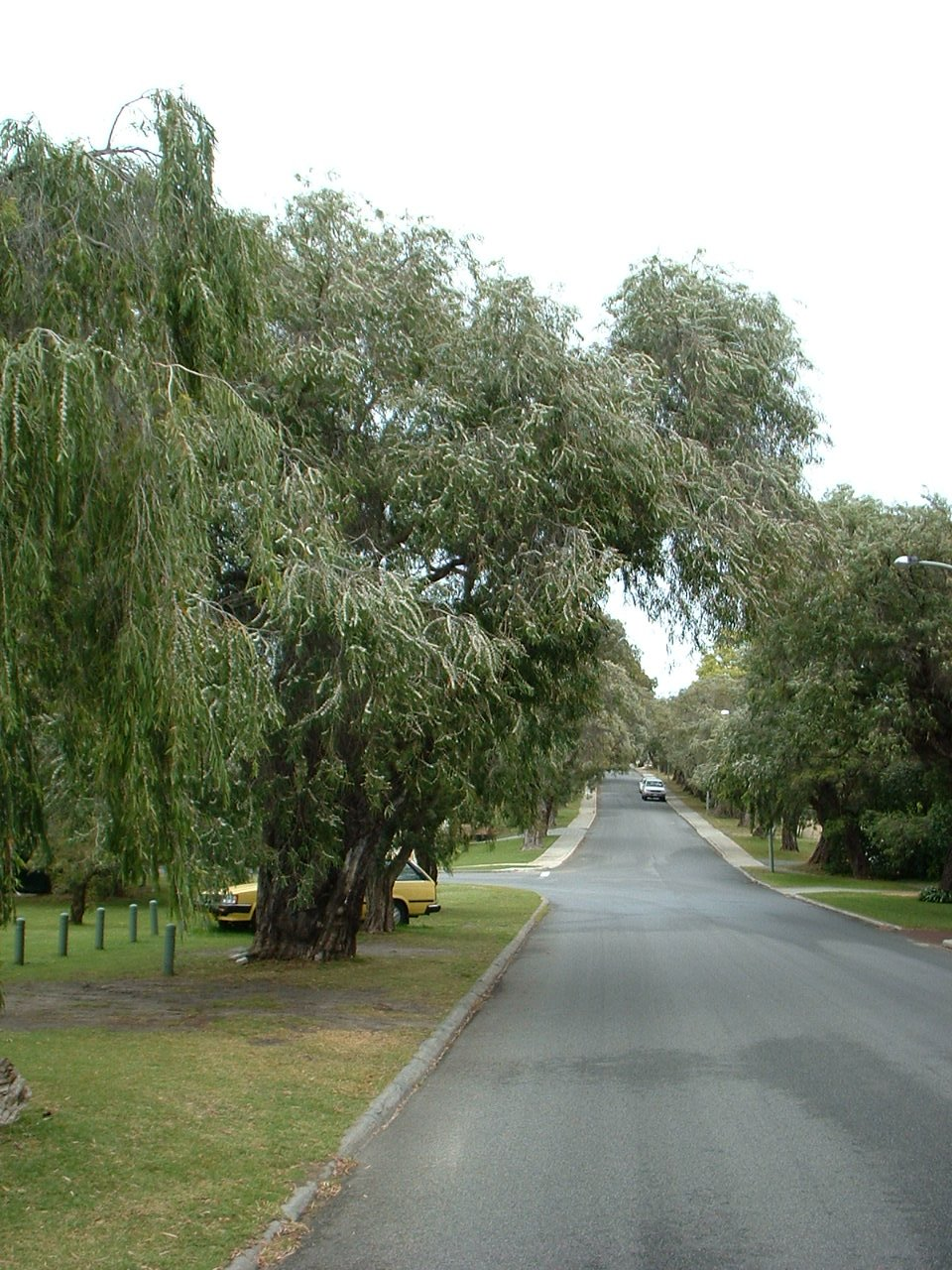
Peppermint trees form an avenue in Keane Street

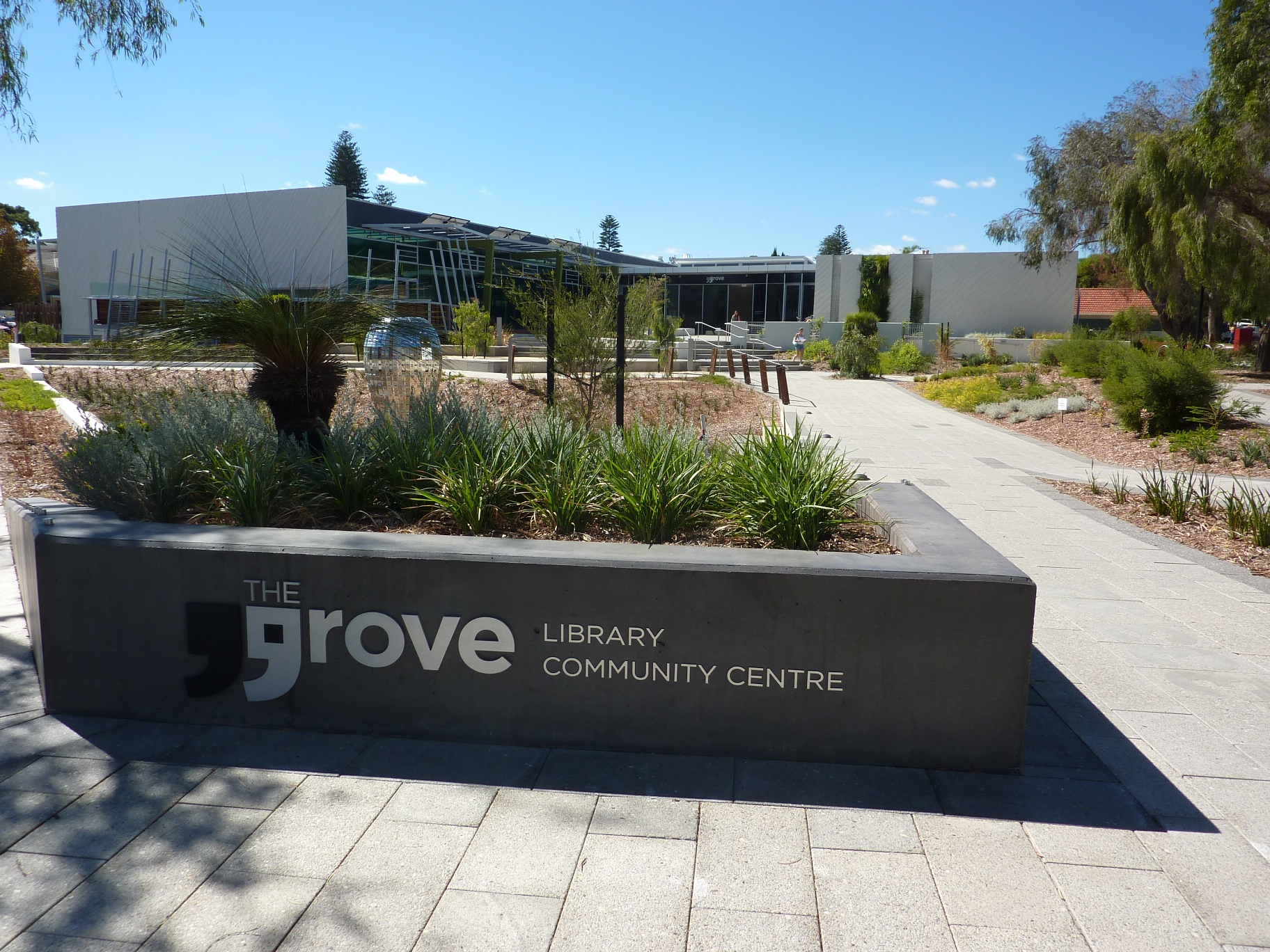
The Grove Library, Peppermint Grove

== Facilities ==
Cottesloe Primary School (established 1896) and Presbyterian Ladies' College are located within the suburb, as are the shire council office and the Grove Library on Stirling Highway, a small shopping centre opposite Cottesloe's Napoleon Street shopping area, and reserves along the riverfront, most notably Manners Hill Park and Keanes Point Reserve, which offer recreational facilities and jetties.

=== The Grove Library ===
The Grove Library is funded by the Town of Cottesloe, the Shire of Peppermint Grove and the Town of Mosman Park. It houses the digital Grove Community History Library, which focuses on the people, places and events that have shaped the suburbs of Cottesloe, Peppermint Grove and Mosman Park. It was established in 2006 as a conventional paper-based community collection but became digital in 2011. Much of the collection is available online.

== Churches ==
There are two churches in Peppermint Grove: St Columba's Presbyterian Church, a Presbyterian church located at the corner of Venn and Keane Streets; and St Mary Star of the Sea, a Roman Catholic church located on Stirling Highway at McNeil Street.

== Transport ==
The suburb is serviced by Fremantle to Perth bus services and the CircleRoute bus route along Stirling Highway, and by Cottesloe and Mosman Park railway stations on the Fremantle line. All services are operated by the Public Transport Authority.

=== Bus ===
- 102 Cottesloe Station to Claremont Station – serves Stirling Highway
- 107 Fremantle Station to Claremont Station – serves View Street, Leake Street and Stirling Highway
- 998 Fremantle Station to Fremantle Station (limited stops) – CircleRoute clockwise, serves Stirling Highway
- 999 Fremantle Station to Fremantle Station (limited stops) – CircleRoute anti-clockwise, serves Stirling Highway

== Politics ==
From 1901 to 1968 and from 1974 to 1980 Peppermint Grove was part of the federal Fremantle electorate, since 1934 a notional Labor seat. Its most prominent member was wartime Prime Minister John Curtin, a Cottesloe resident.

Since 1980 it has been part of the federal division of Curtin. Until 2022, Curtin was regarded as a safe seat for the centre-right Liberal Party, which held the seat continually since its inception, with the exception of a period from 1996 to 1998 when former Liberal member Allan Rocher held the seat as an independent, and from 2022 onwards when it has been held by independent Kate Chaney. In the parliament of Western Australia, its Legislative Assembly electoral district is Cottesloe, held by Sandra Brewer, also of the Liberal Party.

== Notable residents ==
- Sir Charles Gairdner, Governor of Western Australia and Tasmania
- Hon. Sir Francis Burt, former Governor
- Anthony O'Grady Lefroy
- James George Lee-Steere
- Alexander Forrest
- Bessie Rischbieth
- David Malcolm, former Lieutenant-Governor and Chief Justice of Western Australia
- David McComb, lead singer of The Triffids
- Richard Goyder, CEO of Wesfarmers
- Olivia DeJonge, actress
- Laurie Connell, businessman
