= Town of Claremont =

Coordinates: 31°58′48″S 115°46′55″E

- Local government area
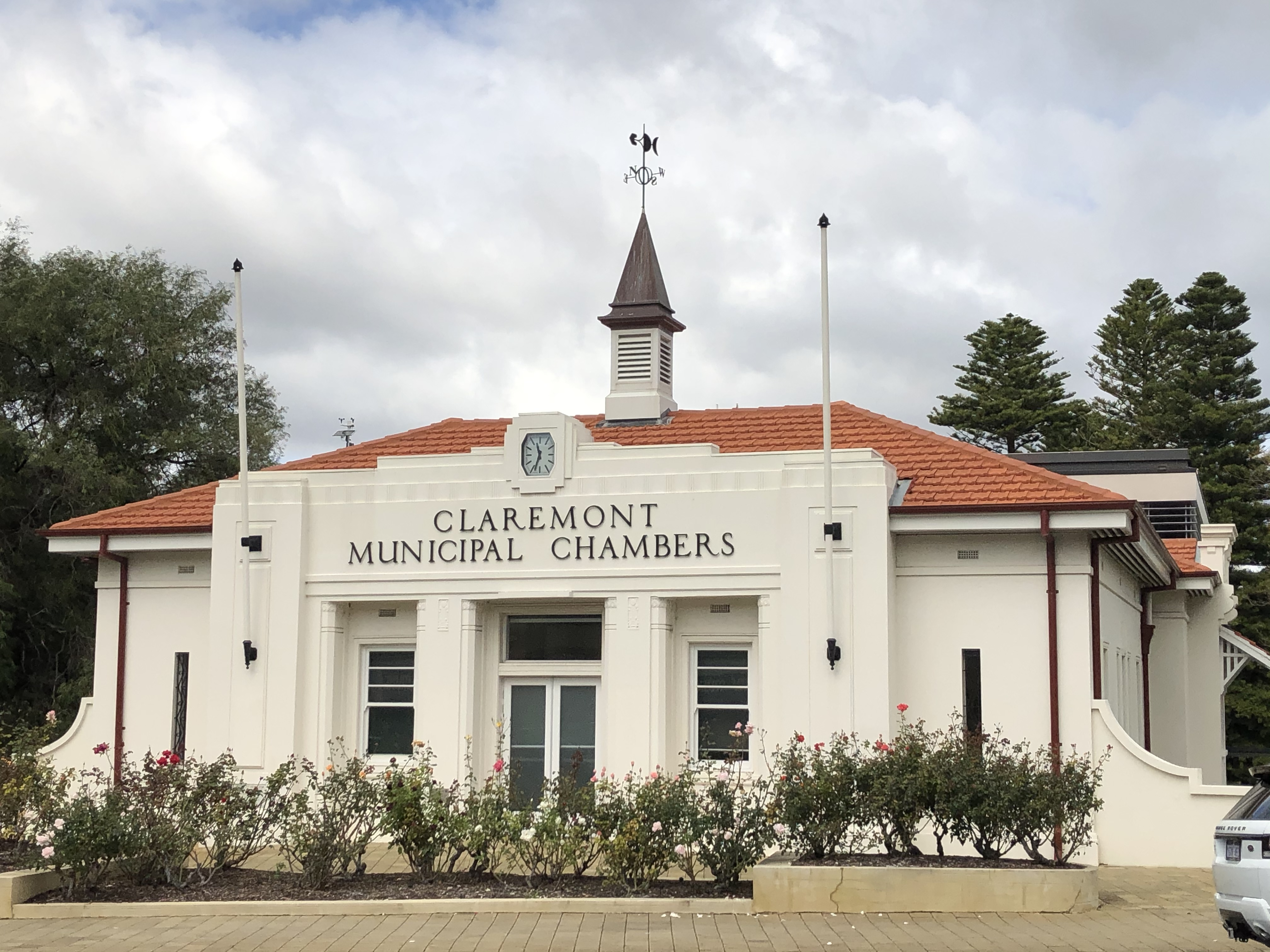
- Town of Claremont offices

- Interactive map of Town of Claremont
- Country: Australia
- State: Western Australia
- Region: West Metropolitan Perth
- Established: 1898
- Council seat: Claremont

Government
  - Mayor: Peter Telford
  - State electorate: Nedlands, Cottesloe
  - Federal division: Curtin

Area
  - Total: 4.9 km^{2} (1.9 sq mi)

Population
  - Total: 11,284 (LGA 2021)
- Website: Town of Claremont
LGAs around Town of Claremont
	Nedlands
Cottesloe	Town of Claremont	Nedlands
Cottesloe	Peppermint Grove	Swan River

The Town of Claremont is a local government area in the inner western suburbs of the Western Australian capital city of Perth, located about halfway between the port city of Fremantle and Perth's central business district. The Town covers an area of 4.9 square kilometres (1.9 sq mi), maintains 48 km of roads and 87 km of footpaths, and has a population of approximately 10,000 as at the 2016 Census.

== History ==
The Municipality of Claremont was created on 17 June 1898 out of parts of the Claremont Road District. On 1 July 1961, Claremont became a town following the enactment of the Local Government Act 1960.

== Wards ==
The Town is divided into 3 wards, each electing three councillors. The mayor is directly elected.

- South Ward
- West Ward
- East Ward

== Suburbs ==
The suburbs of the Town of Claremont with population and size figures based on the most recent Australian census:

Suburb	Population	Area	Map
Claremont *	9,248 (SAL 2021)	4 km^{2} (1.5 sq mi)	
Swanbourne *	4,592 (SAL 2021)	5.2 km^{2} (2.0 sq mi)	

* Both these localities are only partially contained within the LGA boundary.

== Landmarks ==
The Claremont Showground is home each year to the annual Perth Royal Show in September–October. Claremont railway station is located adjacent to the town's main shopping area, which consists of cafes and street shopping in Bay View Terrace and St Quentin's Avenue, as well as the Claremont Quarter shopping centre. Claremont Oval is used for Australian Rules football, and there is a par-three golf course at Lake Claremont. Other landmarks include several private schools: Scotch College, Methodist Ladies' College and Christ Church Grammar School.

On 18 November 2010 the heritage listed Council Chambers were gutted by fire. The fire which started in the local library at the rear of the buildings spread through the offices and chambers, causing millions of dollars' worth of damage.

== Population ==
Historical population

Year	Pop.	±% p.a.
1903	2,727	—
1911	4,222	+5.62%
1921	5,511	+2.70%
1933	5,946	+0.64%
1947	7,769	+1.93%
1954	8,643	+1.53%
1961	8,601	−0.07%
1966	8,938	+0.77%
1971	9,179	+0.53%
1976	8,629	−1.23%

Year	Pop.	±% p.a.
1981	8,193	−1.03%
1986	7,397	−2.02%
1991	8,822	+3.59%
1996	8,688	−0.31%
2001	8,562	−0.29%
2006	8,942	+0.87%
2011	9,280	+0.74%
2016	10,054	+1.62%
2021	11,284	+2.34%

== Heritage listed places ==
As of 2024, 854 places are heritage-listed in the Town of Claremont, of which 20 are on the State Register of Heritage Places, among them the Claremont Teachers College, the Claremont Post Office and the Claremont Railway Station.

== See also ==
- AmpFest, Youth and music festival overseen by the Town of Claremont
