= Victoria Street railway station, Perth =

Railway station in Perth, Western Australia

Victoria Street
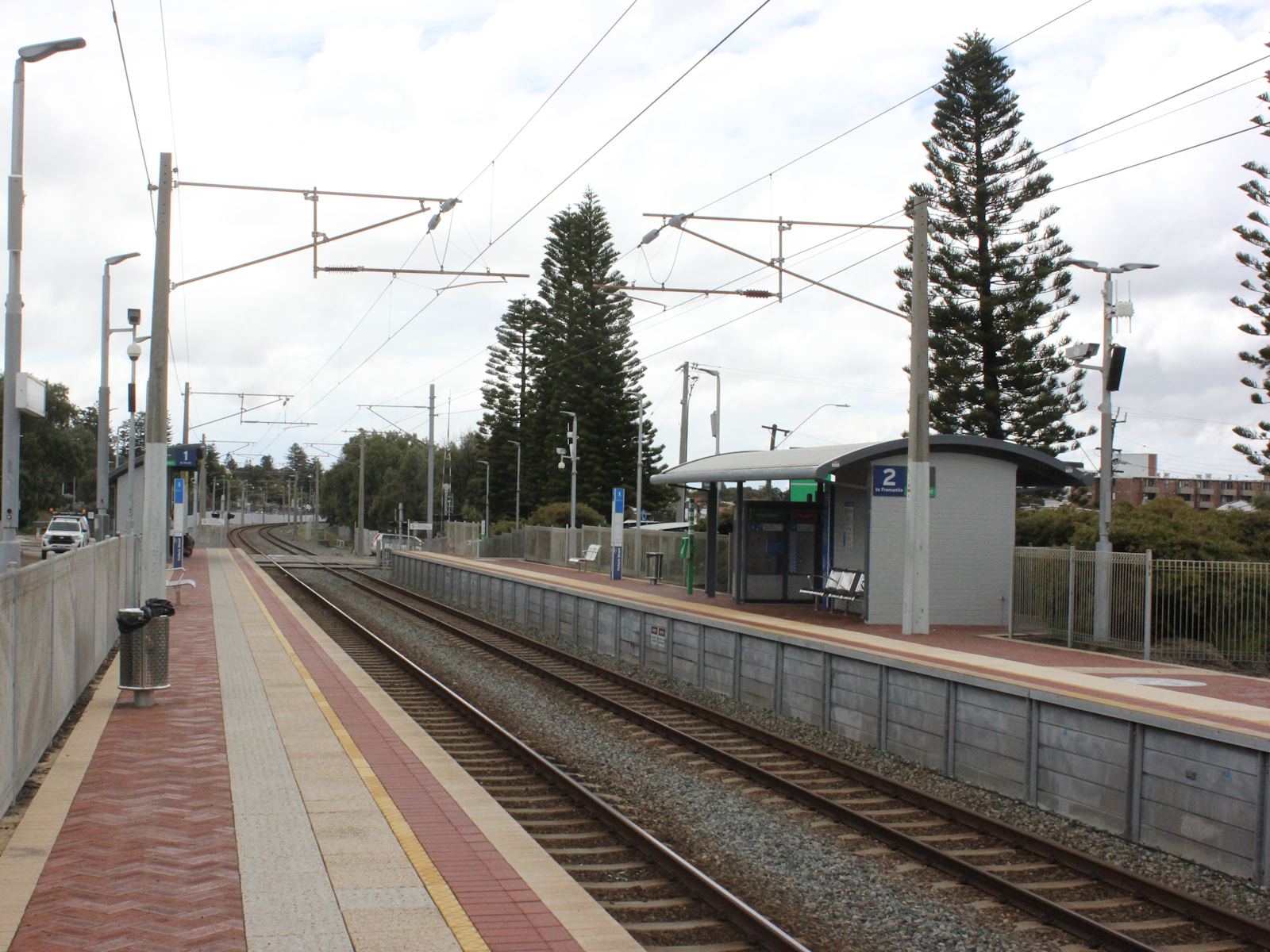
- Northbound view from Platform 1, October 2025

General information
- Location: Stirling Highway, Cottesloe; Australia
- Coordinates: 32°00′43″S 115°45′18″E
- Owner: Public Transport Authority
- Operator: Transperth
- Line: Fremantle line
- Distance: 14.2 kilometres (8.8 mi) from Perth
- Platforms: 2 side
- Tracks: 2

Construction
- Structure type: Ground

Other information
- Station code: FVS; 99331 (platform 1); 99332 (platform 2)
- Fare zone: 2

History
- Opened: 1954

Passengers
- 2013–14: 150,070

Services
Preceding station	Transperth	Following station
Mosman Park towards Perth	Fremantle line	North Fremantle towards Fremantle
Former services
Mosman Park towards Perth	Fremantle line	Leighton towards Fremantle
Location
- Location of Victoria Street railway station

Victoria Street railway station is a railway station on the Transperth network. It is located on the Fremantle line, 14.2 kilometres from Perth station serving the suburbs of Mosman Park and Cottesloe.

== History ==
Victoria Street station opened in 1954. It closed on 1 September 1979 along with the rest of the Fremantle line, re-opening on 29 July 1983 when services were restored. To the west of the station, a now lifted freight line ran from Cottesloe to the Leighton Marshalling Yard.

From 2034, Victoria Street station's platforms are planned to be extended to the south to accommodate six-car trains.

== Services ==
=== Train services ===
Victoria Street station is served by Transperth Fremantle line services from Fremantle to Perth that continue through to Midland via the Midland line.

Victoria Street station saw 150,070 passengers in the 2013–14 financial year.

==== Platforms ====
Victoria Street platform arrangement
Stop ID	Platform	Line	Service Pattern	Destination	Notes
99331	1	Fremantle line	All stations, +S	Perth	
99332	2	Fremantle line	All stations, +S	Fremantle	

=== Bus routes ===
Stop	Route	Destination / description	Notes
Stirling Highway (north bound)	906	Rail replacement service to Perth station	
Stirling Highway (north bound)	998	CircleRoute clockwise to Fremantle station	Limited stops
Stirling Highway (south bound)	906	Rail replacement service to Fremantle station	
Stirling Highway (south bound)	999	CircleRoute anti-clockwise to Fremantle station	Limited stops
