= Shire of Peppermint Grove =

Coordinates: 31°59′56″S 115°46′05″E

Shire of Peppermint Grove Western Australia
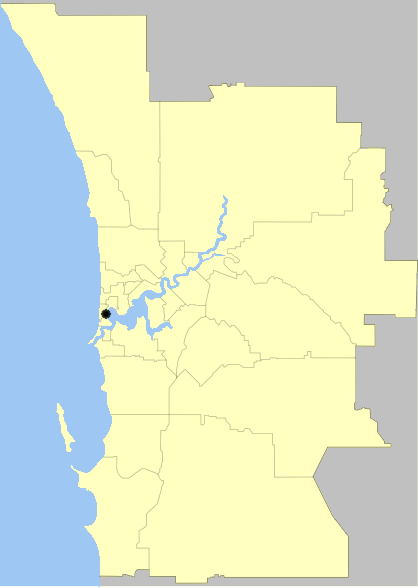
- The Shire of Peppermint Grove within the Perth Metropolitan Area
- Population: 1,597 (LGA 2021)
- Established: 1895
- Area: 1.1 km^{2} (0.4 sq mi)
- President: Karen Farley SC
- Council seat: Peppermint Grove
- Region: Inner Metro Area of Metropolitan Perth
- State electorate(s): Cottesloe
- Federal division(s): Curtin
- Website: Shire of Peppermint Grove
LGAs around Shire of Peppermint Grove:
Cottesloe	Claremont and Cottesloe	Claremont
Cottesloe	Shire of Peppermint Grove	Swan River
Cottesloe	Mosman Park	Mosman Park

The Shire of Peppermint Grove is a local government area in Perth, Western Australia, 12 kilometres (7.5 mi) southwest of the Perth central business district. At 1.1 km^{2} (0.42 sq mi), it is the smallest local government area in Australia; it contains only the eponymous suburb, Peppermint Grove. The council comprises seven elected councillors, with no ward divisions.

== History ==
The Peppermint Grove Road District was gazetted on 4 October 1895. On 1 July 1961, it became a shire under the Local Government Act 1960, which reformed all remaining road districts into shires.

The shire was located on the Perth–Fremantle road (now Stirling Highway) and had received assistance in its maintenance in the past.

In 2014 the Barnett Government sought to encourage the amalgamation of smaller Western Australian Local Governments and reduce the number of Perth metropolitan Councils from 30 to 16. This included the potential merger of Peppermint Grove with other western suburbs local governments, including Claremont, Nedlands, Mosman Park and Cottesloe. Community opposition and threats of legal action from Peppermint Grove and other local governments led to the collapse of the reform process.

== Population ==
Historical population

Year	Pop.	±% p.a.
1911	1,043	—
1921	1,110	+0.62%
1933	1,428	+2.12%
1947	1,474	+0.23%
1954	1,468	−0.06%
1961	1,502	+0.33%
1966	1,602	+1.30%
1971	1,511	−1.16%
1976	1,587	+0.99%

Year	Pop.	±% p.a.
1981	1,540	−0.60%
1986	1,243	−4.19%
1991	1,453	+3.17%
1996	1,592	+1.84%
2001	1,527	−0.83%
2006	1,580	+0.68%
2011	1,528	−0.67%
2016	1,636	+1.38%
2021	1,597	−0.48%

== Heritage-listed places ==
As of 2024, 179 places are heritage-listed in the Shire of Peppermint Grove, of which seven are on the State Register of Heritage Places. In 2019, the Shire lost a six year legal battle with a resident who opposed the local government's heritage classification of his property.
