= Mosman Park, Western Australia =

Mosman Park
- Suburb
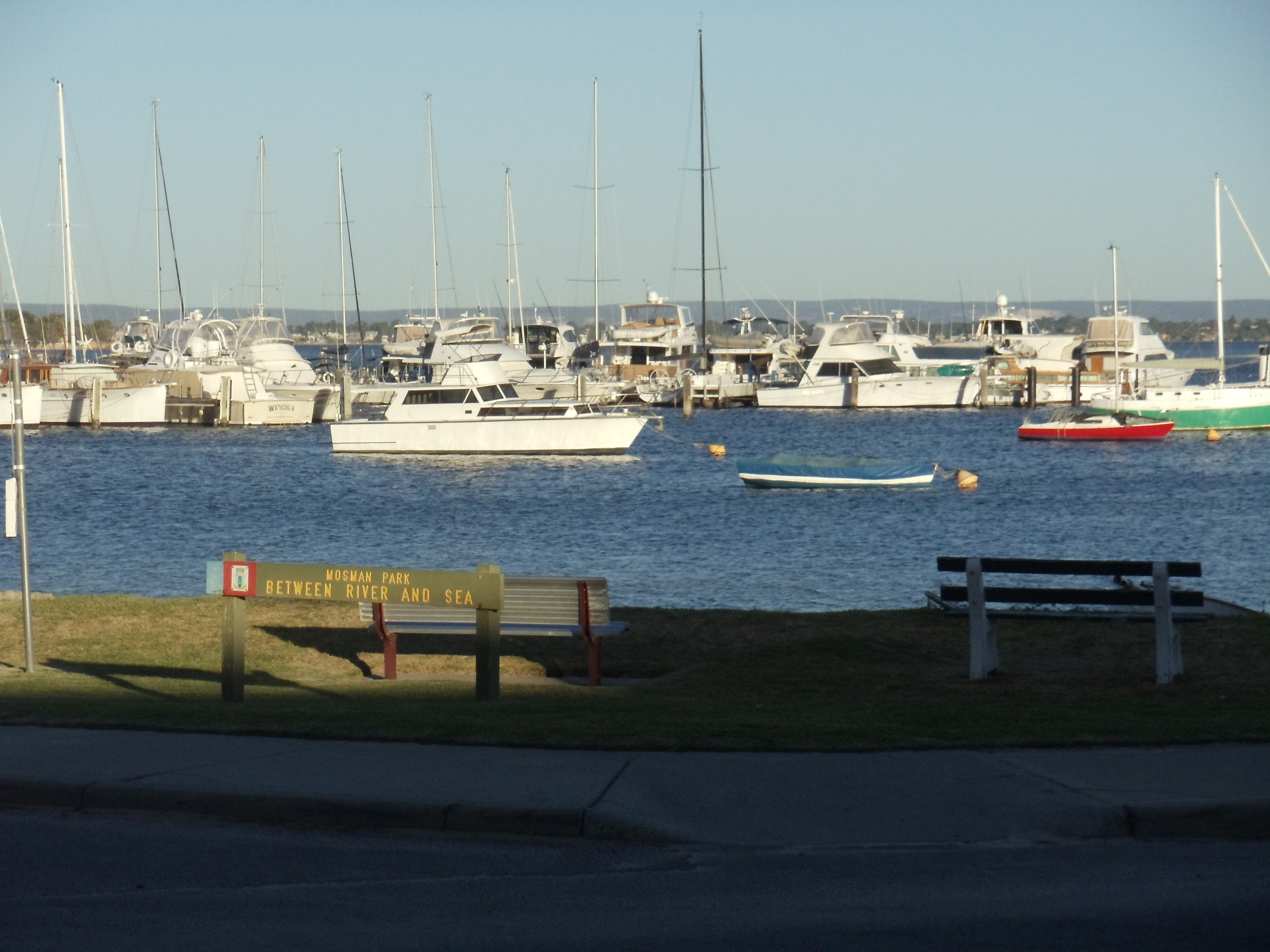
- View of the Swan River and sign of Mosman Park, Western Australia
- Interactive map of Mosman Park
- Coordinates: 32.016°S 115.762°E
- Country: Australia
- State: Western Australia
- City: Perth
- LGA: Town of Mosman Park
- Location: 11 km (6.8 mi) SW of Perth CBD
- Established: 1890

Government
  - State electorate: Cottesloe
  - Federal division: Curtin

Area
  - Total: 4.3 km^{2} (1.7 sq mi)

Population
  - Total: 9,169 (2021 census)
  - Density: 2,132/km^{2} (5,520/sq mi)
- Postcode: 6012
Suburbs around Mosman Park
Cottesloe	Peppermint Grove	Swan River
Indian Ocean	Mosman Park	Swan River
North Fremantle	Swan River	Swan River

Mosman Park is a western suburb of Perth, Western Australia on the north bank of the Swan River in the local government area of the Town of Mosman Park. It was historically known as Buckland Hill (1889–1909), then Cottesloe Beach (1909–1930) and again Buckland Hill (1930–1937). From 1937 it was named Mosman Park, derived from Mosman in Sydney, the birthplace of Richard Yeldon, a member of the Buckland Hill Road Board. Mosman Park is now considered an affluent suburb, but prior to the 1970s was one of Perth's major industrial centres.

== Geography ==
Mosman Park is bounded by the Indian Ocean and the Fremantle railway line to the west, a line south of Johnston Street to the north, and the Swan River to the east and south with approximately 5 kilometres (3.1 mi) of river frontage. To the west of the railway line Mosman Park includes a section of approximately 600 metres (2,000 ft) of ocean frontage, south of the extension of Boundary Road and north of the extension of McCabe Street.

== History ==
Mosman Park lies within the traditional Country of the Whadjuk Noongar people. Stone tools recovered at Minim Cove (Garungup) have been dated to ca 9,930 years before present.

Following the 1827 expedition by Captain James Stirling on HMS Success to assess the suitability of the Swan River district for a settlement, it was the original plan for the 1829 expedition to use the area around Buckland Hill as the site for a town for the proposed settlement. The expedition's botanist Charles Fraser wrote:

these hills are admirably adapted for the site of a town, their elevated situation commanding a view of the whole of Canning Sound, with the adjacent coast, the interior for some distance, and the meanderings of the river. Their lying open to all breezes, too, is an additional advantage.

This view, however, was later superseded by Captain Stirling on his arrival with the first immigrants in Parmelia in June 1829, by placing the capital, Perth, about 20 kilometres (12 mi) from the port.

Mosman Park was established with the first survey of town lots in 1889 as Buckland Hill, taking its name from the prominent local hill that was a major maritime navigation mark for shipping from the earliest days of colonization.

Mosman Park was a major industrial centre for the state with a Holden car and truck assembly plant (1926–1972), the Colonial Sugar Refinery, the Mount Lyell Farmers' Fertilisers superphosphate works, the W.A. Rope and Twine Works and the West Australian Brushware Co. factory (one of the largest of its kind in Australia). All were closed by the 1970s. Today, almost all of Mosman Park is residential, with significant parklands at Buckland Hill and along the river.

In 2009, a riverside mansion in Mosman Park was sold for $57.5 million (equivalent to $88.2 million in 2022), setting a new Australian property record. The house was bought by mining entrepreneur Chris Ellison from mining heiress Angela Bennett.

In the 2021 census, Mosman Park had a population of 9,169 people living in 4,113 private dwellings.

The mansions lining the waterfront parklands of Mosman Park, tracing the Swan River, highlight its high status. The median house value is A$1.62 million.

As of 2023, the town's Local Heritage Survey identifies 84 heritage places within the suburb, with 7 appearing on the State Register, including the Leighton Battery, the Memorial Hall and the St Luke's Anglican Church Group.

The town attracted notoriety in January 2026 when a family including their two sons were found dead in a murder-suicide which was reported to police by a carer who had arrived for an appointment.

== Transport ==
Mosman Park is served by the Mosman Park and Victoria Street railway stations. Various public buses, including the CircleRoute bus route travel along Stirling Highway and through Mosman Park's eastern section.

=== Bus ===
- 107 Fremantle Station to Claremont Station – serves Stirling Highway, Gibbon Street, Victoria Street, Owston Street, Beagle Street, Manning Street and Palmerston Street
- 998 Fremantle Station to Fremantle Station (limited stops) – CircleRoute clockwise, serves Stirling Highway, Victoria Street Station and Mosman Park Station
- 999 Fremantle Station to Fremantle Station (limited stops) – CircleRoute anti-clockwise, serves Stirling Highway, Mosman Park Station and Victoria Street Station

=== Rail ===
- Fremantle Line
  - Mosman Park Station
  - Victoria Street Station

== Politics ==
From 1901 to 1968 and from 1974 to 1980 Mosman Park was part of the Fremantle electorate, since 1934 a notional Labor seat. Its most prominent member was wartime Prime Minister John Curtin, a Cottesloe resident.

Since 1980 it has been part of the federal division of Curtin. Curtin has historically been regarded as a safe seat for the centre-right Liberal Party, which held the seat mostly continually since its inception. However, the seat was won by the independent Kate Chaney at the 2022 federal election. In the parliament of Western Australia, its Legislative Assembly electoral district is Cottesloe, held by David Honey, also of the Liberal Party.

== Notable residents ==
- Angela Bennett, mining heiress and businesswoman
- Lang Hancock (1909–1992), iron ore mining developer
- Harriet Hooton (1875–1960), women's activist and editor
- John Hughes, businessman
- Jessica Marais, actress
- Rose Porteous, widow of Lang Hancock
- Ralph Sarich, orbital engine and orbital combustion process inventor
- Sir Albert Wolff (1899–1977), chief justice and lieutenant-governor of Western Australia

== See also ==
- Buckland Hill Reservoir
