= Stirling Highway =

Highway in Perth, Western Australia

Stirling Highway Western Australia
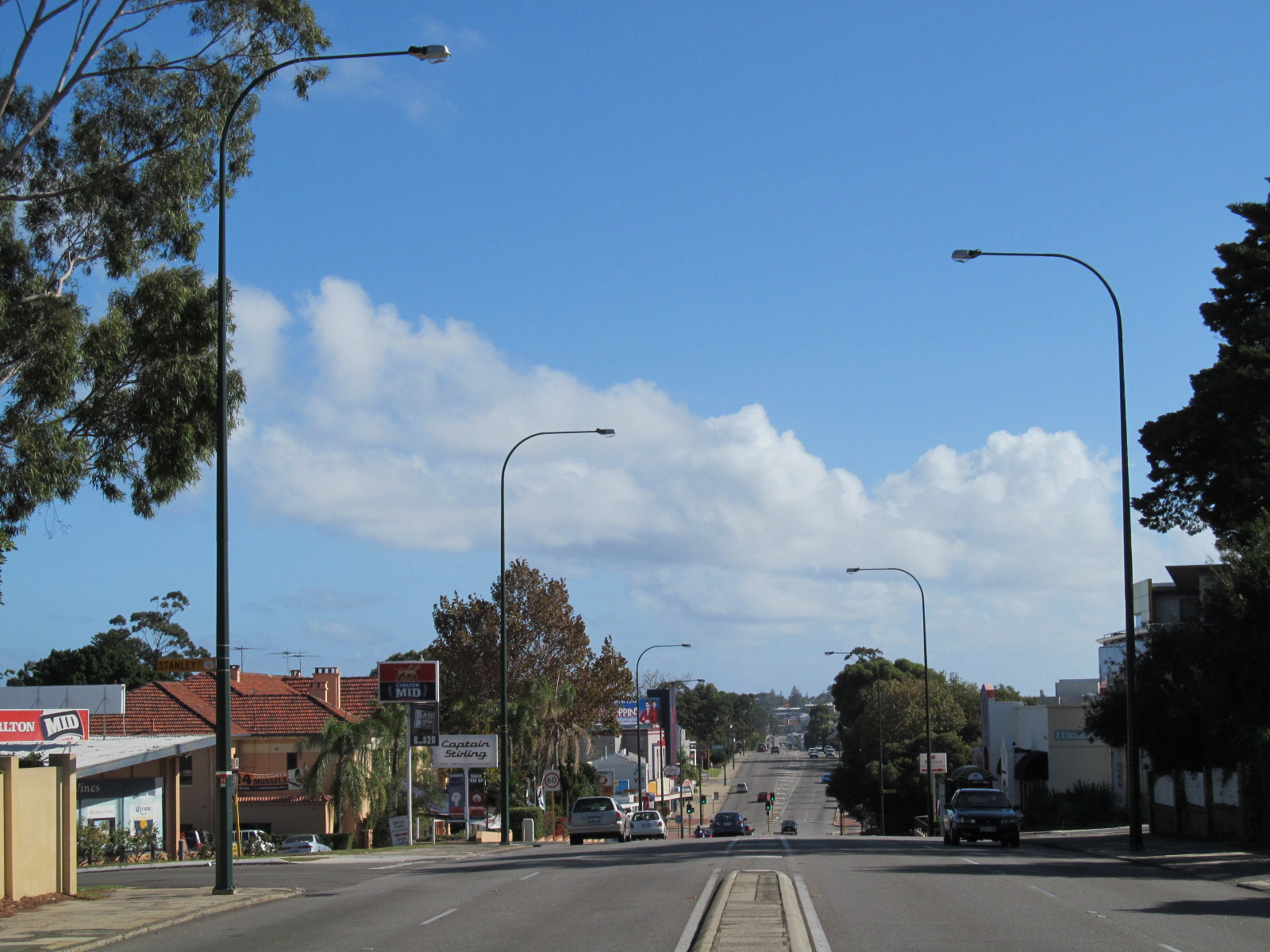
- View west from Webster Street in Nedlands

General information
- Type: Highway
- Length: 13 km (8.1 mi)
- Opened: 1930s
- Route number(s): State Route 5

Major junctions
- Northeast end: Mounts Bay Road (State Route 5), Crawley
- Eric Street (State Route 71); Queen Victoria Street (State Route 12)
- Southwest end: High Street (State Route 7), Fremantle

Location(s)
- Major suburbs: Nedlands, Claremont, Cottesloe, Mosman Park, North Fremantle

Highway system
- Highways in Australia; National Highway • Freeways in Australia; Highways in Western Australia

Stirling Highway is, for most of its length, a four-lane single carriageway and major arterial road between Perth, Western Australia and the port city of Fremantle in Western Australia on the northern side of the Swan River. The speed limit is 60 km/h (37 mph). East of Crawley, it continues as Mounts Bay Road which links Crawley and the nearby University of Western Australia to the Perth central business district.

The highway passes through several of Perth's western suburbs, such as Nedlands, Claremont, Peppermint Grove, Cottesloe and Mosman Park. It also passes the University of Western Australia in Crawley, and several private secondary schools – namely Christ Church Grammar School, Presbyterian Ladies' College and Methodist Ladies' College. In addition, major shopping areas exist at Claremont and Cottesloe, while many smaller businesses and retailers are dotted along the highway. The section of road from Cottesloe leading south runs alongside the railway.

== History ==
Stirling Highway initially developed as a rough track linking the new townsites of Perth and Fremantle following the establishment of the Swan River Colony in 1829. Construction of a formal road along the track's alignment did not take place for several decades, due to labour shortages, the slow initial development of the colony, the initial absence of a bridge across the Swan River at the southern end of the track, and the use of the river itself as the principal means of transport between the towns.

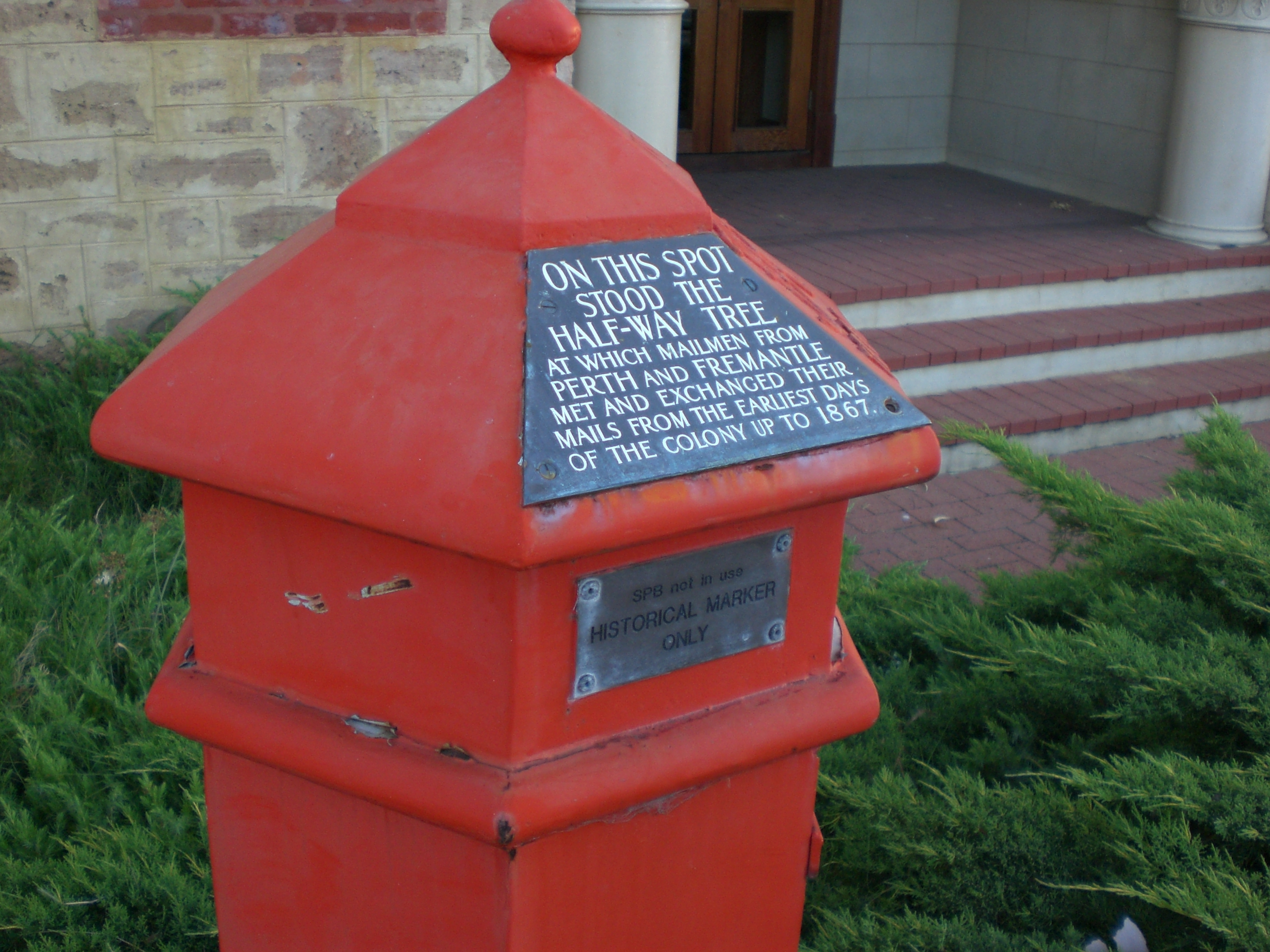
Halfway tree: historical marker for the tree where mail was exchanged between Perth and Fremantle until 1867.

Convict labour was used to construct the road after the colony was constituted as a penal settlement in 1850, and this was completed by 1858. The road was declared a public highway in 1881.

The Perth to Fremantle railway line was completed in 1881, running alongside the road for part of its length. This spurred the development of Perth's western suburbs, including land alongside the road.

The road was known as the Perth-Fremantle Road until 1932, when it was renamed for the first Governor of Western Australia, Admiral Sir James Stirling. Construction of the modern highway was formally commenced in the 1930s. It was completed in sections of approximately 1.6 kilometres (1 mile) per year. The schedule was as follows:

- 1934 – Broadway, Nedlands to Weld Street, Nedlands
- 1935 – Weld Street, Nedlands to Bay View Terrace, Claremont
- 1936 – Bay View Terrace, Claremont to Anstey Street, Claremont
- 1937 – Anstey Street, Claremont to Johnston Street, Peppermint Grove
- 1938 – Johnston Street, Peppermint Grove to Leighton Crossing, North Fremantle
- 1939 – Leighton Crossing, North Fremantle to Fremantle, including the new Fremantle Traffic Bridge

At the peak of trams and trolleybuses in metropolitan Perth (from the 1930s to the early 1950s) several routes ran along Stirling Highway, and steel poles along the edge of the highway were used to hold the required wiring. Following the dismantling of the tramways, the remaining poles became rusty and quite unsightly, and most were removed in the early 2000s as part of the underground power project.

Driving over the Stirling Bridge towards Fremantle

In the 1970s, a new crossing of the Swan River was constructed slightly to the east of the Fremantle Traffic Bridge. Named the Stirling Bridge, it was opened in 1974 by Premier Charles Court. The highway was rerouted to the new bridge, and terminated at Canning Highway. The new bridge was part of a longer-term proposal to construct a new bypass of central Fremantle.

An extension further south from Canning Highway to High Street was opened on 26 November 1985 by the federal and state Ministers for Transport, Peter Morris and Julian Grill. The cost of the project reached A$5.5m, including the compulsory acquisition and demolition of 90 homes. The project was jointly funded by the state and federal governments and was designed by consulting engineers, Airey, Ryan and Hill for the Main Roads Department, who undertook construction of the highway. This section represented the first part of the planned Fremantle Eastern Bypass. Those plans have since been cancelled, and High Street represents Stirling Highway's permanent southern/western terminus.

== Major intersections ==
All intersections below are controlled by traffic signals unless otherwise mentioned.

LGA	Location	km	mi	Destinations	Notes
Perth	Crawley	0	0.0	Winthrop Avenue (State Route 61) – Subiaco, West Perth, Joondanna, Sir Charles Gairdner Hospital, University of Western Australia	Eastern terminus. Continues as Mounts Bay Road (State Route 5) eastwards. Traffic can enter the UWA entrance on the south side of the intersection but cannot exit.
Perth–Nedlands boundary	Crawley–Nedlands boundary	0.5	0.31	Hampden Road north / Broadway south – Sir Charles Gairdner Hospital, University of Western Australia	
Nedlands	Nedlands	1.5	0.93	Dalkeith Road – Dalkeith	
Nedlands–Claremont boundary	Nedlands–Claremont boundary	2.6	1.6	Loch Street – Karrakatta, Mount Claremont	Access to Loch Street railway station.
Claremont	Claremont	3.4	2.1	Leura Avenue	Access to Claremont railway station.
Claremont	Claremont	3.6	2.2	Bay View Terrace	
Claremont	Claremont	3.9	2.4	Stirling Road – Dalkeith, Swanbourne	
Claremont–Cottesloe boundary	Claremont–Cottesloe boundary	5.1	3.2	Eric Street (State Route 71) west – Swanbourne, Scarborough, Hillarys / Osborne Parade east	Access to Cottesloe Beach and Grant Street railway station. Main connection to West Coast Highway (State Route 71)
Cottesloe–Peppermint Grove boundary	Cottesloe–Peppermint Grove boundary	6.1	3.8	Napoleon Street west / Leake Street east	
Cottesloe–Peppermint Grove boundary	Cottesloe–Peppermint Grove boundary	6.2	3.9	Jarrad Street	Access to Cottesloe railway station.
Cottesloe–Mosman Park boundary	Cottesloe–Mosman Park boundary	7.0	4.3	Salvado Street west / Willis Street east	Non-signalised, however Salvado Street provides a crossing of the Fremantle railway line to the west.
Cottesloe–Mosman Park boundary	Cottesloe–Mosman Park boundary	7.3	4.5	Glyde Street	
Cottesloe–Mosman Park boundary	Cottesloe–Mosman Park boundary	7.8	4.8	Victoria Street	Access to Victoria Street railway station.
Mosman Park	Mosman Park	8.1	5.0	Wellington Street	
Fremantle	North Fremantle	9.1	5.7	McCabe Street	
Fremantle	North Fremantle	10.0	6.2	Alfred Road	
Fremantle	North Fremantle	10.3	6.4	Queen Victoria Street (State Route 12) – Fremantle	
Fremantle	North Fremantle	10.7	6.6	Tydeman Road (Tourist Drive 204) west – Cottesloe, Fremantle Harbour / John Street east	Similar arrangement as the Winthrop Avenue intersection where traffic can access John Street from Stirling Highway or Tydeman Road but cannot exit. Tourist Drive 204 (Sunset Coast Tourist Drive) northern concurrency terminus.
Swan River		11.0– 11.4	6.8– 7.1	Stirling Bridge	
East Fremantle	East Fremantle	11.5	7.1	Canning Highway (State Route 6 – Fremantle, Applecross, Como, Perth Airport	Tourist Drive 204 (Sunset Coast Tourist Drive) southern terminus.
East Fremantle–Fremantle boundary	East Fremantle–Fremantle boundary	12.2	7.6	Marmion Street – Palmyra, Myaree, Booragoon	
Fremantle	Fremantle	12.6	7.8	High Street (State Route 7) – Myaree, Bull Creek, Shelley, Perth Airport	Southern terminus.
1.000 mi = 1.609 km; 1.000 km = 0.621 mi: Concurrency terminus; Incomplete access; Note: Intersections with minor local roads are not shown

== See also ==
- Highways in Australia
- List of highways in Western Australia
- List of major roads in Perth, Western Australia
