= Town of Mosman Park =

Coordinates: 32°00′58″S 115°45′43″E

- Local government area
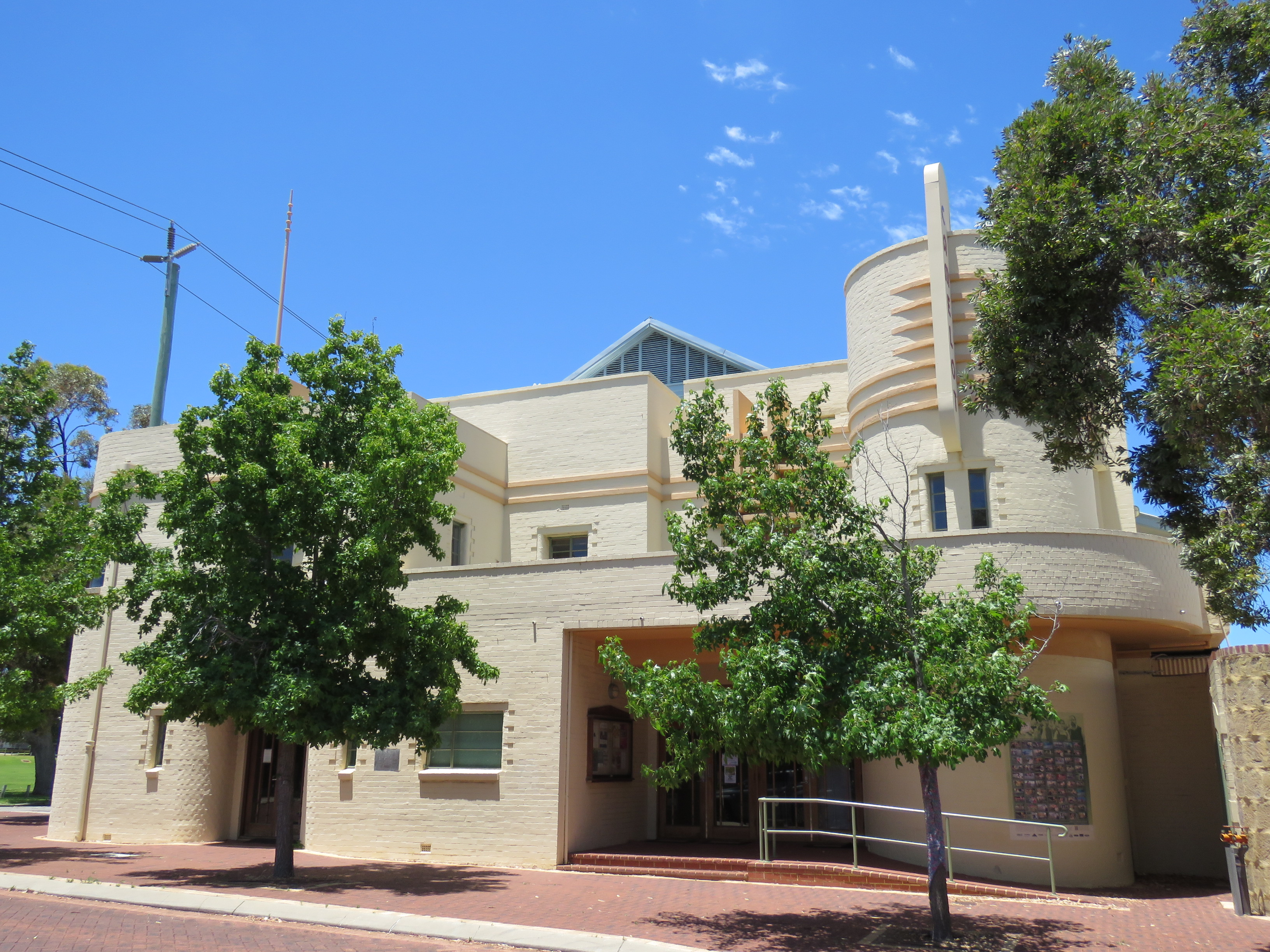
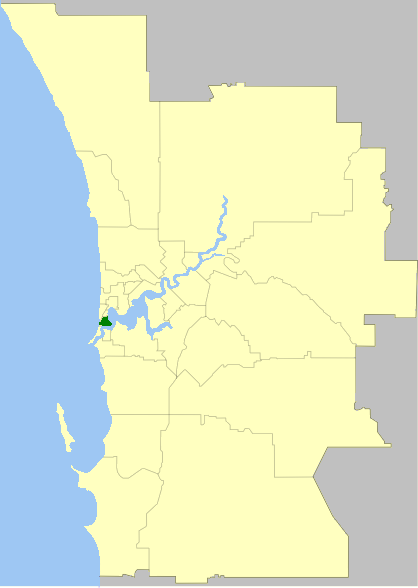
- The state heritage listed Memorial Hall, constructed as local hall and offices for the Buckland Hill Roads Board in 1921 The Town of Mosman Park within the Perth Metropolitan Area

- Interactive map of Town of Mosman Park
- Country: Australia
- State: Western Australia
- Region: West Metropolitan Perth
- Established: 1899
- Council seat: Mosman Park

Government
  - Mayor: Paul Shaw
  - State electorate: Cottesloe
  - Federal division: Curtin

Area
  - Total: 4.3 km^{2} (1.7 sq mi)

Population
  - Total: 9,169 (LGA 2021)
- Website: Town of Mosman Park
LGAs around Town of Mosman Park
Cottesloe	Peppermint Grove	Swan River
Cottesloe	Town of Mosman Park	Swan River
Indian Ocean, Fremantle	Swan River	Swan River

The Town of Mosman Park is a local government area of Western Australia. It covers an area of approximately 430 hectares (1,100 acres) in western metropolitan Perth, the capital of Western Australia and lies about 14 kilometres (8.7 mi) southwest of the Perth CBD and 5 kilometres (3.1 mi) from Fremantle.

== History ==
The Buckland Hill Road District was created on 6 October 1899. It was renamed the Cottesloe Beach Road District on 2 July 1909, but reverted to the Buckland Hill name on 10 October 1930.

It was renamed the Mosman Park Road District on 12 February 1937. It became the Shire of Mosman Park with effect from 1 July 1961 following the passage of the Local Government Act 1960, which reformed all remaining road districts into shires. It assumed its current name when it was granted town status on 26 January 1962.

== Wards ==
The town has six councillors and a mayor. The town is split into North and South wards.

== Suburbs ==
Mosman Park is the only suburb within this municipality.

== Population ==
Historical population

Year	Pop.	±% p.a.
1911	1,704	—
1921	3,221	+6.57%
1933	3,628	+1.00%
1947	5,442	+2.94%
1954	6,199	+1.88%
1961	5,862	−0.80%
1966	5,793	−0.24%
1971	7,199	+4.44%
1976	6,760	−1.25%

Year	Pop.	±% p.a.
1981	7,018	+0.75%
1986	6,688	−0.96%
1991	7,254	+1.64%
1996	7,337	+0.23%
2001	7,732	+1.05%
2006	8,251	+1.31%
2011	8,598	+0.83%
2016	8,757	+0.37%
2021	9,169	+0.92%

== Heritage listed places ==
As of 2024, 91 places are heritage-listed in the Town of Mosman Park, of which seven are on the State Register of Heritage Places, among them the Leighton Battery.

== See also ==
- AmpFest, Youth and music festival overseen by the Town of Mosman Park
