= Stephenson Avenue =

Road in Perth, Western Australia

Stephenson Avenue Western Australia

General information
- Type: Road
- Length: 3.5 km (2.2 mi)
- Route number(s): State Route 64 (Osborne Park section); State Route 65 (Mount Claremont section)

Major junctions
Stephenson Avenue (Osborne Park)
- North end: Cedric Street (State Route 64)
- Mitchell Freeway (State Route 2); Scarborough Beach Road (State Route 75)
- South end: Pearson Street (State Route 64); Jon Sanders Drive
Stephenson Avenue (Mount Claremont)
- North end: Underwood Avenue (State Route 65); Perry Lakes Drive
- Montgomery Avenue
- South end: Rochdale Road (State Route 65)

Stephenson Avenue refers to two separate sections of road in the western suburbs of Perth, Western Australia.

The first section is a 2.05-kilometre (1.27 mi) section of two-lane dual carriageway linking Cedric Street to Pearson Street and Jon Sanders Drive in Osborne Park via the Mitchell Freeway and Scarborough Beach Road. The second section is a 1.5-kilometre (0.93 mi) two-lane single carriageway in Mount Claremont used to link central Perth to West Coast Highway via Hay Street, Underwood Avenue and Rochdale Road.

The two sections of road are to date the only evidence of the originally proposed Stephenson Highway, a controversial highway that was proposed to connect Swanbourne to Innaloo. The Mount Claremont section was completed in 1962, while a section in Osborne Park linking Pearson Street and Jon Sanders Drive to Scarborough Beach Road was completed in 1994, and was further extended to Cedric Street in 2025; however evidence of previous attempts to construct this section of the road can be seen on Landgate aerial photos from 1985.

The two roads are named after Gordon Stephenson, an influential person in the development and expansion of Perth through the Metropolitan Region Scheme during the 20th century.

== History ==
An arterial road (Note: Stephenson refers to these as "Important Regional Roads", which he defines as "the principal feeders and connectors to the Major Regional Highways... [that] should be designed for through traffic movements and intersections should be limited in number" and "should eventually be completed to dual carriageway standard".) branching north from what was then West Coast Highway (now Rochdale Road), through Bold Park, past the edge of Herdsman Lake, and then continuing north to Hamersley, was included in the 1955 Stephenson-Hepburn Report. The 1962 preliminary edition of the Metropolitan Region Scheme, which was derived from the report, included a controlled-access highway on a similar alignment, with the addition of what is now the Mitchell Freeway terminating at it while it continued north. The 1963 first gazetted edition of the Metropolitan Region Scheme retained virtually the same route from West Coast Highway, but amended the northern part to terminate at what is now the Mitchell Freeway, while the Mitchell Freeway would extend north instead.

In 1962, the Mount Claremont section from Rochdale Road (then West Coast Highway) to Underwood Avenue was completed to provide access to Perry Lakes Stadium and other facilities constructed for the 1962 British Empire and Commonwealth Games.

In the early 1990s, as part of the Northern Suburbs Transit System project, Stirling railway station was constructed in the median strip of the Mitchell Freeway immediately south of Cedric Street, ultimately opening in 1993. The station's location had presented some interesting design challenges for the future extension of Stephenson Highway over the Mitchell Freeway as the road reserve for the future highway initially ran directly over the station at the southern end of its platforms. During the design of the station and its approach roads, the engineering firm Ove Arup & Partners was tasked with investigating and designing road layouts to accommodate for both future and current needs. Due to the nature of the future Stephenson Highway, a number of road layout options were considered including:

- Original designs first proposed for the freeway by the Main Roads Department, consisting of a diamond interchange between Scarborough Beach Road and Stephenson Highway, with links to the existing Oswald Street and Osborne Park.
- As per the above option, but without the Osborne Park link.
- As per the above option, but without the link of Oswald Street between Scarborough Beach Road and Cedric Street (an option recommended by station designers Hames Sharley architects).
- A design only known as the Forbes and Fitzhardinge planning scheme, of which no information or design drawings exist within the engineers' report.

All of the above designs involved significantly complex road layouts which amongst others included partial cloverleaf interchanges, and the construction of new bridges connecting the future highway to Cedric Street.

In 1994, the Osborne Park section from Scarborough Beach Road to Pearson Street and Jon Sanders Drive was completed as the Stirling Link Road. While it was designed with providing the connection between the Mitchell Freeway and a potential future Stephenson Highway in mind, its primary purpose was to act as a feeder from the Mitchell Freeway to Innaloo.

In October 2011, the Metropolitan Region Scheme was amended to rezone the Stephenson Highway road reserve north of Jon Sanders Drive to the Mitchell Freeway to "City Centre". This was desired by the City of Stirling on the basis that the reserve prevented it from developing into a true city centre. While an extension of Stephenson Avenue to the Mitchell Freeway would continue, it would be as a "low key road" with on-street parking, while Stephenson Highway's intended freight functions would be adopted by an extended Hutton Street.

=== Extension project ===
Between August 2020 and December 2025 Stephenson Avenue was extended northwards from Scarborough Beach Road to connect to Cedric Street and the Mitchell Freeway.

The first phase of construction was undertaken by the City of Stirling, and extended the road approximately 500 metres (1,600 ft) to an intersection with the new road of Howe Street. It is two lanes in each direction, with on street parking. This is unlike the previously existing section of Stephenson Avenue to the south, which is a controlled access road. There is also an intersection with Oswald Street, which was extended to the east of its previous intersection with Ellen Stirling Boulevard. Both intersections have traffic lights. This phase began construction in August 2020 and aimed to be completed by September 2021. It opened for traffic on 11 February 2022.

The second phase of construction was undertaken by Main Roads Western Australia, and extended the road further, over the Mitchell Freeway to connect to Cedric Street. Stephenson Avenue has a diamond interchange with the freeway, intended to supersede the current diamond interchange with Cedric Street, which was demolished. A new access road was provided from Stephenson Avenue to the Stirling railway station carpark. As part of the same project, the Stirling station bus interchange will also be upgraded, increasing the number of bus stands from 18 to 30 on a new bridge crossing the freeway. This phase began construction in March 2022 and originally aimed to be completed by late 2023.

In November 2022, the second phase completion date was delayed to February 2024 and then September 2024 after design disagreements between stakeholders. Further disruption was caused by the collapse of Clough, which had been contracted to deliver the project in a joint venture with Acciona and WSP, though the government denied further delays were anticipated. The extension opened to traffic on 13 December 2025, with some associated works such as the bus interchange upgrade to be completed in 2026.

== Intersections ==
=== Stephenson Avenue (Osborne Park) ===
LGA	Location	km	mi	Destinations	Notes
Stirling	Stirling	0	0.0	Cedric Street (State Route 64)	Traffic light controlled intersection
Stirling	Stirling–Innaloo–Osborne Park tripoint	0.4	0.25	Mitchell Freeway (State Route 2)	Diamond interchange
Stirling	Innaloo–Osborne Park boundary	0.7	0.43	Sarich Court	Traffic light controlled T-junction; no right turn onto Stephenson Avenue
Stirling	Innaloo–Osborne Park boundary	0.85	0.53	Flax Way	Traffic light controlled T-junction
Stirling	Innaloo–Osborne Park boundary	1.13	0.70	Oswald Street	Traffic light controlled T-junction
Stirling	Innaloo–Osborne Park boundary	1.42	0.88	Scarborough Beach Road (State Route 75)	Traffic light controlled intersection
Stirling	Woodlands–Osborne Park–Herdsman tripoint	2.04	1.27	Pearson Street (State Route 64) / Jon Sanders Drive	Traffic light controlled T-junction; State Route 64 concurrency terminus
1.000 mi = 1.609 km; 1.000 km = 0.621 mi: Concurrency terminus; Incomplete access; Unopened

=== Stephenson Avenue (Mount Claremont) ===
LGA	Location	km	mi	Destinations	Notes
Cambridge	City Beach–Floreat boundary	0	0.0	Underwood Avenue (State Route 65) / Perry Lakes Drive	Give way sign controlled T-junction; Stephenson Avenue continues east as Underwood Avenue; State Route 65 concurrency terminus
Nedlands	Mount Claremont	0.5	0.31	Herb Elliot Drive	Stop sign controlled T-junction
Cambridge–Nedlands boundary	Mount Claremont–City Beach boundary	1.2	0.75	Montgomery Avenue	Give way sign controlled seagull intersection
Cambridge	Mount Claremont–City Beach boundary	1.5	0.93	Rochdale Road (State Route 65)	Give way sign controlled seagull intersection; State Route 65 concurrency terminus
1.000 mi = 1.609 km; 1.000 km = 0.621 mi: Concurrency terminus
