= Perth Wetlands =

Bodies of water on Swan Coastal Plain

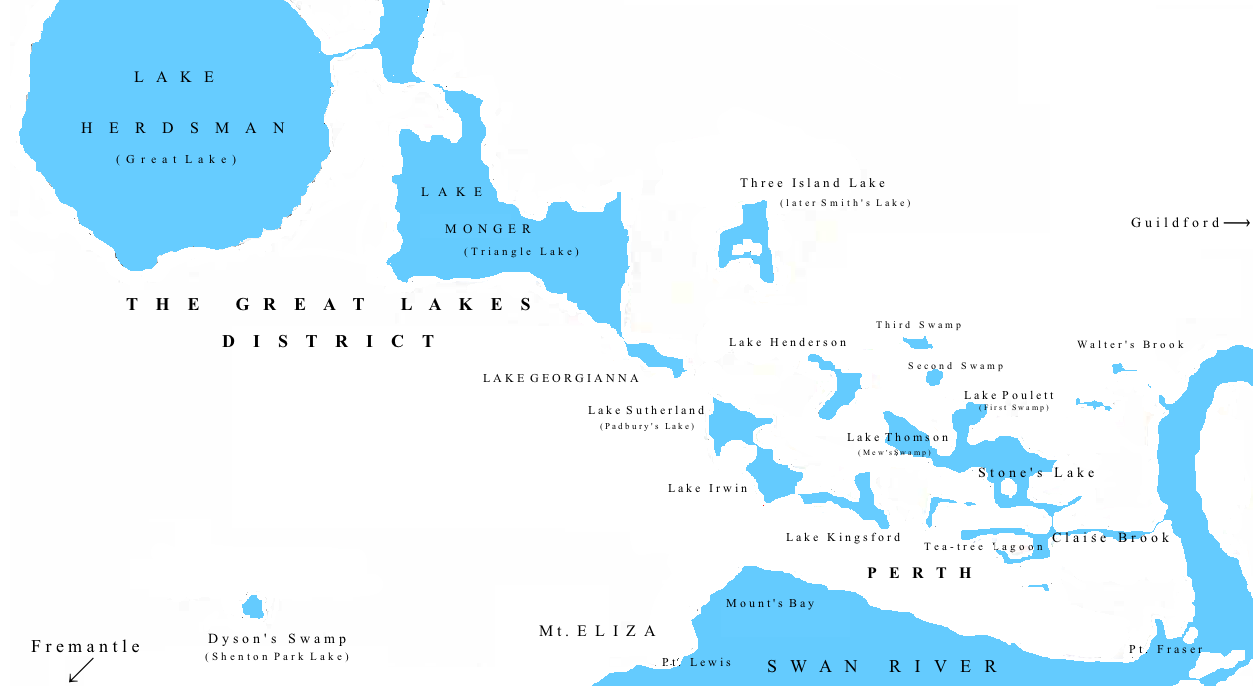
A reconstructed map of the Perth Wetlands c. 1830, based on John Septimus Roe's 1834 map

The Perth Wetlands, also known as the Perth Great Lakes or the Great Lakes District, was a collection of fresh-water wetlands, swamps and lakes located on the Swan Coastal Plain north of the city of Perth in Western Australia. Over a period of 80 years from the first British settlement in Western Australia in 1829 most of the wetlands were reclaimed for use as housing, parks and market gardens.

== Location ==
The wetlands were spread from Claisebrook Cove, north of the present city on the Swan River, through to Herdsman Lake to the north-west of the city, approximately 3.8 kilometres (2.4 mi) east of the coast. The lakes were located in the present-day suburbs of Perth, Highgate, West Perth, East Perth, Northbridge, North Perth, Leederville, West Leederville, Wembley, Glendalough, Mt. Hawthorn and Herdsman, and the local government areas of the City of Perth, the City of Vincent, the Town of Cambridge and the City of Stirling. Jualbup Lake, formerly known as Dyson's Swamp and Shenton Park Lake, is located in Shenton Park in the City of Subiaco.

== History ==
=== Aboriginal uses ===
Aboriginal tribes occupied the area around Perth for around 40,000 years before European settlement, using the wetlands as a source of food (fish, waterfowl, crayfish and turtles) and fresh water. Local Nyungar tribes continued to use the lakes for resources and as a meeting place up until they were reclaimed for housing developments in the 1940s, with meetings of up to 400 people recorded in corroborees at Lakes Monger and Henderson as well at Hyde Park.

=== European settlement ===
Perth was founded by Captain James Stirling in June, 1829. The area on which Perth was built was described by George Seddon in Sense of Place (1972) as follows:

The site [of Perth] was a well-timbered, low and narrow sand-ridge running east- south-east from Mt Eliza. ... To the north of this narrow ridge, there was a chain of freshwater lakes: Smith's Lake, Lake Henderson, Third Lake, Lake Sutherland, Lake Irwin, Lake Tompson, Lake Poulett, Stones Lake, and Tea Tree Lake, which was part of Clause's Brook. These lakes were in a broad valley running south-east from Lake Monger to the Swan River [...].

Following the arrival of the first Europeans in 1829, the township of Perth was gradually expanded. The area to the north of the township, was not considered ideal for settlement due to the extensive wetlands that stretched for almost 10 kilometres (6.2 mi) immediately north of the town site. Gradually, lakes closer to the city were drained, with the first drainage work commencing in 1832. Some wetlands were reclaimed by individual settlers on whose land the lakes encroached, others were reclaimed to be used for public works and housing. At the same time, the Swan River foreshore was reclaimed to ease transportation along the river.

The last of the lakes were drained in the 1880s. However, some areas including Herdsman Lake, Lake Monger and Third Swamp (now Hyde Park) were unable to be drained due to their location, size or depth.

== List of features ==
=== Remaining features ===
Name	Former name(s)	Coordinates	Area		Comments
Name	Former name(s)	Coordinates	ha	acre	Comments
Lake Herdsman	Great Lake	31°55′12″S 115°48′25″E	300	741	The largest of the lakes. It has retained much of its former shape, although most of its interior is swamp rather than permanent water.
Galup	Triangle Lake; Lake Monger	31°55′44″S 115°49′40″E	70	173	The second-largest remaining lake. Much of the area of the lake was reclaimed for residential development, as well as Leederville Oval.
Claise Brook	Claisebrook Cove; formerly known as Clause's Lagoon	31°57′06″S 115°52′53″E			A small inlet of the Swan River located in East Perth south of the Graham Farmer Freeway. Claise Brook was a free-flowing seasonal brook, dry in summer and flooding in winter, up until the 1990s, until it was reclaimed for development. However, in recent years, the brook has been refurnished, and is now a much smaller still body of water known as Claisebrook Cove. A small footbridge known as Trafalgar Bridge crosses over it.
Walter's Brook	Known by Noongar Peoples as Warndoolier	31°56′32″S 115°52′56″E			A small tidal inlet of the Swan River located in Banks Reserve, Mount Lawley, originally named by Governor James Stirling after his older brother Walter. The brook originally flowed much further inland, and was located to the north of an open swamp, near the site of the present-day East Perth railway station. The Mount Lawley Main Drain is located at Walter's Brook, and formerly supplied stormwater to Walter's Brook Engine House at East Perth Power Station.
Smith's Lake	Three Island Lake; known by Noongar Peoples as Danjanberup	31°55′58″S 115°51′02″E			A small suburban lake located between Beatty Park and Charles Veryard Reserve in North Perth. The area was originally owned by the Gooey family who operated a market garden near the site, before it was resumed by the Perth City Council in 1959, and was drained and subdivided for industrial and residential use. The lake was reduced to approximately 1/30 of its original size.
Hyde Park Lakes	Formerly known as Third Swamp; known by Noongar Peoples as Boojamooling	31°56′15″S 115°51′46″E			Hyde Park is located on the site of Third Swamp, and still contains two lakes that were originally part of the Perth Wetlands, but were unable to be drained due to their depth of 2 metres (6 ft 7 in).

=== Former features ===
- Tea-tree Lake – a small lagoon that appeared seasonally to the west of Claise Brook during flooding.
- Lake Kingsford – a lake located close to the inner-city of Perth that was drained in the 1830s. Most of the railways in Perth, and associated infrastructure, including Perth railway station, Perth Underground station, the Horseshoe Bridge and the main section of Wellington Street, were built on reclaimed land from Lake Kingsford.
- Stone's Lake (Yoorgoorading) – Perth Oval is located on the site of Stone's Lake
- Lake Poulett ("First Swamp"; known by Noongar Peoples as Chalyeding)
- Lake Thomson ("Mew's Swamp") – partial reclamation by Thomas Mews led to the name Mew's Swamp being given
- Lake Henderson (Boojoormelup)
- Lake Georgianna – a small lake to the south of Lake Monger, near the present-day Mitchell Freeway interchange
- Lake Irwin – a medium-size lake in between Lakes Sutherland and Kingsford. Perth Entertainment Centre and later Perth Arena were built on reclaimed land on the former site of the lake.
- Lake Sutherland ("Padbury's Lake")
- Second Swamp

== Nature ==
=== Flora ===
Species that are or were prominent in the Perth wetlands include:

==== Trees and shrubs ====
- Melaleuca rhaphiophylla (swamp paperbark) – found especially in Lakes Herdsman, Monger and formerly Lake Henderson.
- Banksia littoralis (swamp banksia)
- Eucalyptus rudis (flooded gum)
- Eucalyptus camaldulensis (river red gum)
- Various species of Xanthorrhoea (grass trees)
- Melaleuca preissiana (modong)
- Banksia littoralis (swamp banksia)
- Kunzea ericifolia (spearwood) – woody, evergreen shrub usually 2 to 6 metres (6 ft 7 in to 19 ft 8 in) tall.
- Banksia ilicifolia (holly-leaf banksia)

==== Sedges ====
- Baumea articulata
- Typha orientalis (broadleaf cumbungi) – generally considered a weed; also a fire hazard in summer.
- Schoenoplectus validus (great bulrush)

==== Herbaceous and aquatic plants ====
- Potomogeton pectinatus (fennel pondweed)
- Najas marina (prickly waternymph)
- Cotula coronopifolia (buttonweed) – an introduced species originally from Africa that appears on dried-up lakebeds during summer, especially in Claisebrook Cove.

==== Fungi ====
- Phytophthora cinnamomi – a soil-borne water mould causing dieback, a major plant fungus affecting trees at Herdsman Lake and Lake Monger.

=== Fauna ===
Species that are or were prominent in the Perth wetlands include:

==== Birds and waterfowl ====
Surveys have recorded over 30 different species of birds at Point Fraser, and over 100 different species of native and non-native birds that inhabit Lakes Herdsman and Monger for some period of the year, around two-thirds of which breed there. The most notable species include:

- Cygnus atratus (black swan) – Western Australia's state emblem, found on both the flag and coat-of-arms of Western Australia, as well as in Australian popular culture as a symbol of Western Australia.
- Several varieties of duck, including:
  - Tadorna tadornoides (mountain duck)
  - Chenonetta jubata (wood duck)
- Several varieties of cormorant, including:
  - Phalacrocorax varius (pied cormorant)
  - Microcarbo melanoleucos (little pied cormorant)
  - Phalacrocorax fuscescens (black cormorant)
  - Phalacrocorax sulcirostris (little black cormorant)

==== Reptiles and amphibians ====
- Cherax quinquecarinatus (common gilgie) – a small freshwater variety of crayfish that was especially present in lakes Herdsman and Monger. They were used as a source of food by Aborigines up until the 1940s.
- Cherax destructor (common yabby) – an introduced species of crayfish posing a threat to the gilgie. It was first documented in Western Australia in the 1930s.
- Chelodina colliei (long-necked turtle) – a small freshwater turtle endemic to Southwest Australia, growing up to 40 cm (16 in) in length.

==== Fish ====
- Pseudogobius olorum (Swan River goby) – a small, native fish commonly found in Herdsman Lake.

== See also ==
- Perth City Link
- Islands of Perth, Western Australia
