= Churchlands, Western Australia =

Churchlands
- Suburb
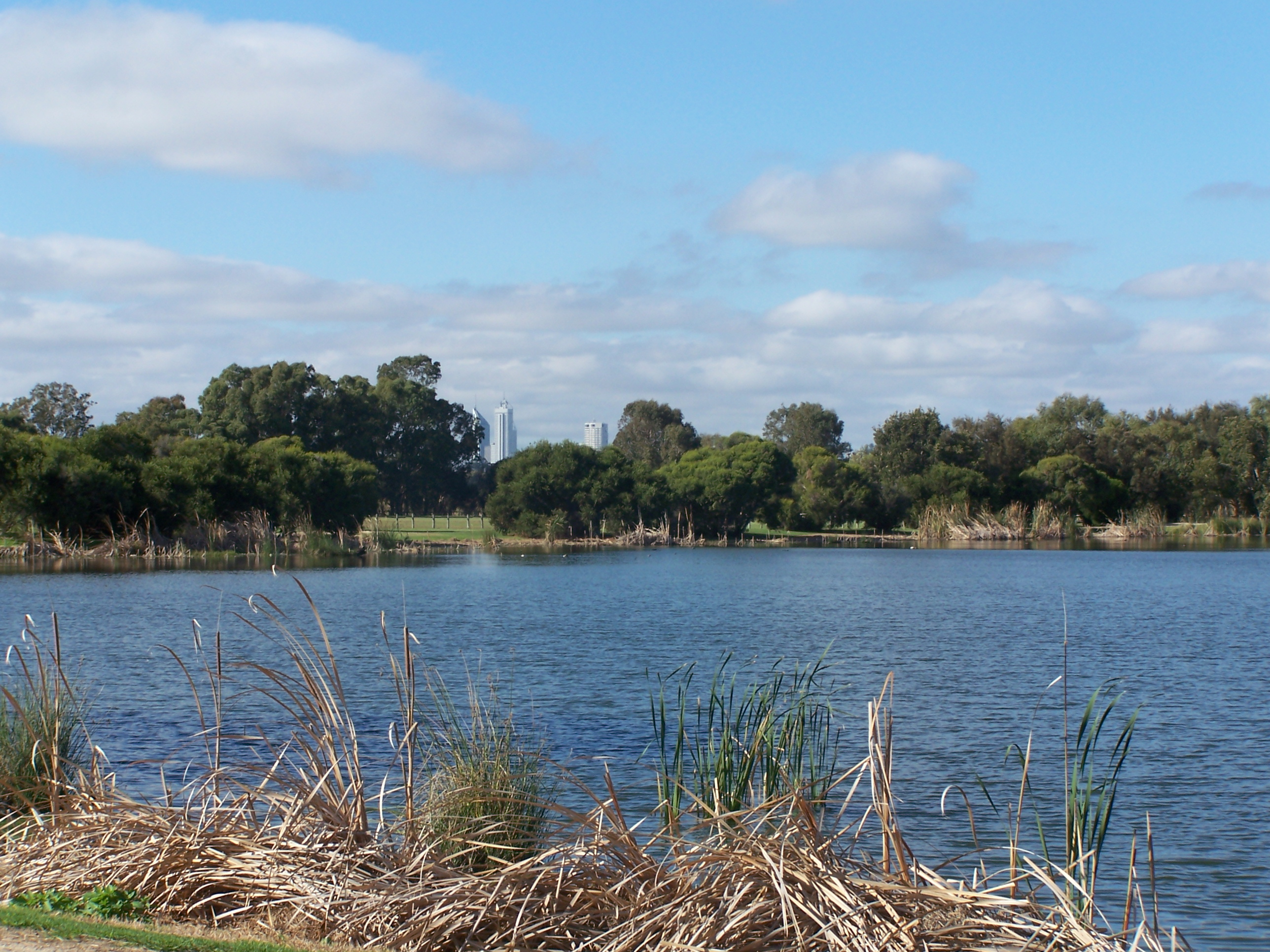
- Herdsman Lake looking SE towards Perth city centre
- Interactive map of Churchlands
- Coordinates: 31.922°S 115.79°E
- Country: Australia
- State: Western Australia
- City: Perth
- LGA: City of Stirling
- Location: 5 km (3.1 mi) NW of Perth CBD

Government
  - State electorate: Churchlands
  - Federal division: Curtin

Population
  - Total: 3,638 (SAL 2021)
- Postcode: 6018
Suburbs around Churchlands
Wembley Downs	Doubleview	Woodlands
Wembley Downs	Churchlands	Glendalough
Floreat	Floreat	Wembley

Churchlands is a suburb of Perth, Western Australia approximately 8 km (5 mi) north-west of the central business district; it lies within the local government area of the City of Stirling. Churchlands is an expensive suburb with most homes built after the 1980s. Its post code is 6018.

== History ==
This suburb became known as "Churchlands" after being purchased by the Roman Catholic Church in 1891 from the Trigg family.

== Education and sporting facilities ==
Schools in the area include Churchlands Primary School, Churchlands Senior High School, Hale School and Newman College.

Newman College has its years 3 to 6 and years 7 to 12 located on two campuses in Churchlands.

Subiaco Marist Cricket Club is headquartered at Newman College.

=== Edith Cowan ===
It was formerly home to the Churchlands campus of Edith Cowan University, which closed in 2008.

The campus had been the Churchlands Teachers College (1972-1981) and the Churchlands campus of the Western Australian College of Advanced Education (1982-1990) prior to the founding of Edith Cowan University in 1991, and was the location of the university's headquarters until 2003.

The site was subsequently redeveloped as the Churchlands Green housing estate, while a small section of the site, including the campus amphitheatre, was set aside as Edith Cowan Reserve, serving as a memorial to the former campus.

== Geography ==
On the eastern border of Churchlands is the large 300-hectare (741-acre) Herdsman Lake, which is populated by many bird, amphibian and freshwater fish species. Picnic and bird-watching areas are accessible from the suburb.

== Transport ==
=== Bus ===
- 83 Perth Busport to City Beach – serves Cromarty Road and Empire Avenue
- 84 Perth Busport to City Beach – serves Selby Street, Flynn Street, Pearson Street and Hale Road
- 85 Perth Busport to Glendalough Station – serves Selby Street
- 998 Fremantle Station to Fremantle Station (limited stops) – CircleRoute Clockwise, serves Flynn Street and Pearson Street
- 999 Fremantle Station to Fremantle Station (limited stops) – CircleRoute Anti-Clockwise, serves Pearson Street, Flynn Street and Selby Street

== See also ==
- Local government areas of Western Australia
- List of Perth suburbs
- List of postal codes in Australia
