= Herdsman =

Herdsman (plural herdsmen) can refer to:

- Herder, a worker who lives a possibly semi-nomadic life, caring for various domestic animals
- Herdsman, Western Australia, a suburb of Perth
  - Herdsman Lake, a groundwater lake located in Herdsman
- The Herdsman, a 1982 Chinese film by Xie Jin
- Stephen Herdsman (born 1975), American soccer defender
- the constellation Boötes
