= Wembley Downs, Western Australia =

Wembley Downs
- Suburb
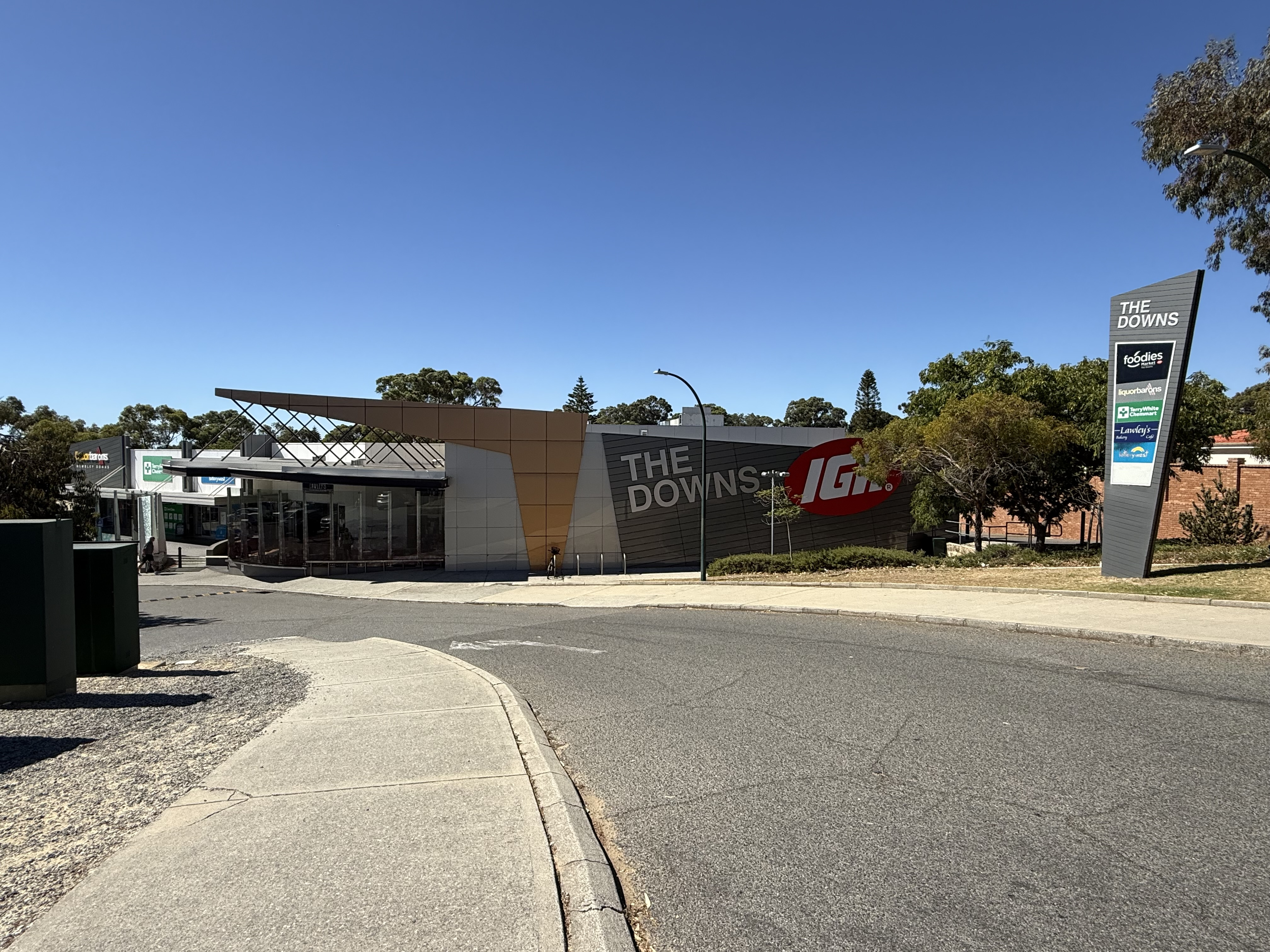
- The Downs Shopping Centre, February 2026
- Interactive map of Wembley Downs
- Coordinates: 31.918°S 115.779°E
- Country: Australia
- State: Western Australia
- City: Perth
- LGAs: City of Stirling; Town of Cambridge
- Location: 10 km (6.2 mi) WNW of Perth CBD; 4 km (2.5 mi) SSE of Scarborough

Government
  - State electorate: Churchlands
  - Federal division: Curtin

Area
  - Total: 4.4 km^{2} (1.7 sq mi)

Population
  - Total: 6,743 (SAL 2021)
- Postcode: 6019
Suburbs around Wembley Downs
Scarborough	Doubleview	Woodlands
City Beach	Wembley Downs	Churchlands
City Beach	City Beach	Floreat

Wembley Downs is a northwestern suburb of Perth, Western Australia. It is about 10 km from the central business district.

== History ==
The name "Wembley Downs" is derived from the name of the local golf course and the name was used by residents before being officially approved in 1959. The golf course was named after the suburb of Wembley, several kilometres east of Wembley Downs. The name "Wembley" originates from a town in England.

In 1927 Wembley Downs was subdivided into approximately 90 lots. Development was slow, due partly to the thick virgin bush and limestone outcrops, which made building difficult. In 1947 the Perth Road Board had to resume 600 blocks for unpaid rates, and these were sold at very low prices. However, growth accelerated in the 1950s, and by the 1970s the area was almost completely developed. The key defining demographic characteristics of the Wembley Downs area are its predominantly family household structure and higher income levels relative to most other areas of the City of Stirling and the Perth metropolitan area.

Hale School, a selective and private Anglican boys' school, is located in Wembley Downs along with a state primary school and "The Downs", a small shopping centre which burnt down in October 2008. The street plan of Wembley Downs was designed in the 1960s in the "garden suburb" formation, in a circular pattern around the main intersection at Hale and Weaponess Roads.

== Transport ==
=== Bus ===
- 82 City Beach to Perth Busport – serves The Boulevard
- 83 City Beach to Perth Busport – serves Empire Avenue
- 84 City Beach to Perth Busport – serves Hale Road
- 412 Scarborough Beach Bus Station to Stirling Station – serves Cobb Street and Dunrossil Street
