= Woodlands, Western Australia =

Woodlands
- Suburb
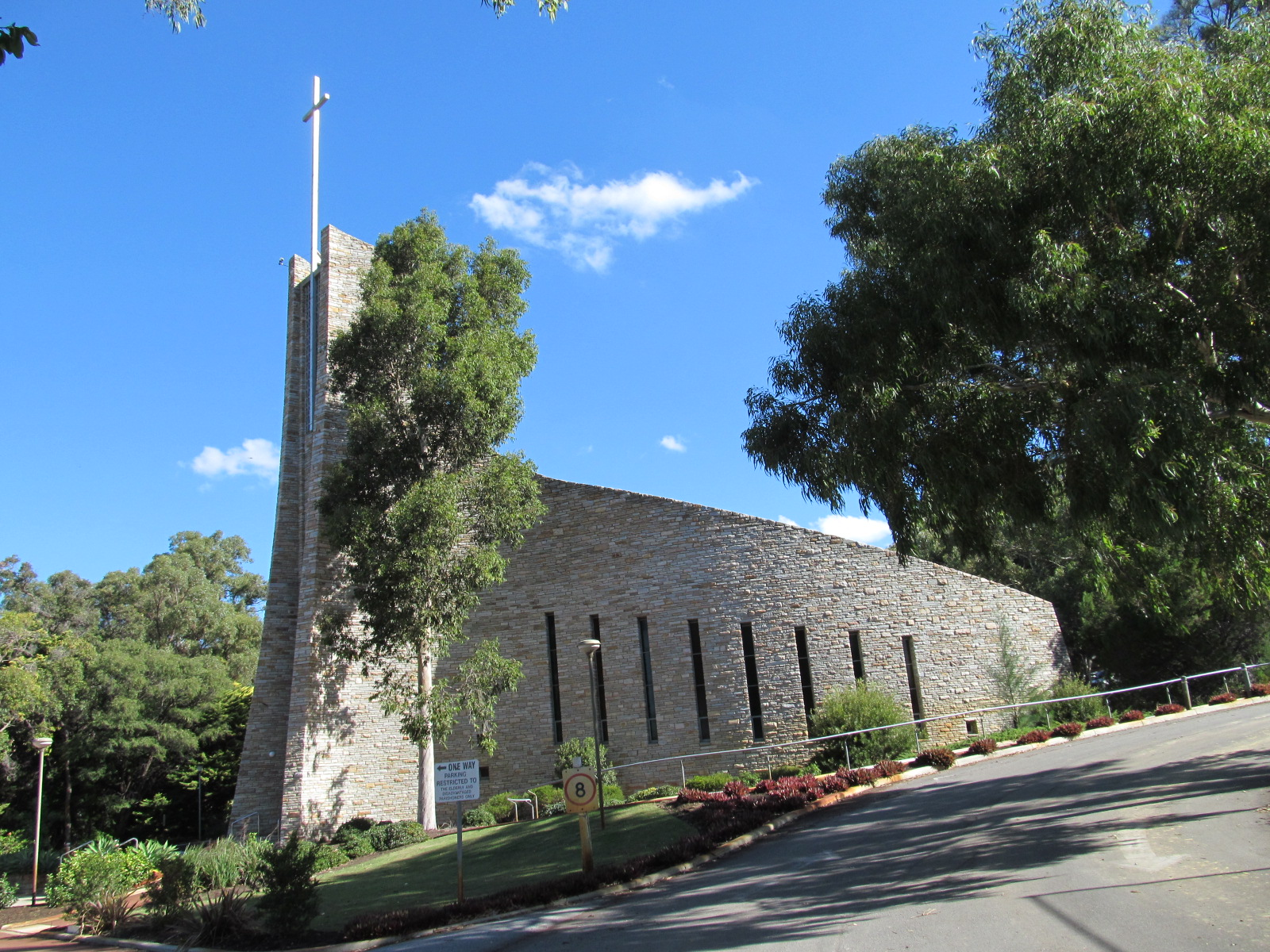
- Our Lady of the Rosary Roman Catholic church, Woodlands
- Interactive map of Woodlands
- Coordinates: 31.9093°S 115.7906°E
- Country: Australia
- State: Western Australia
- City: Perth
- LGA: City of Stirling
- Location: 8 km (5.0 mi) NNW of Perth CBD

Government
  - State electorate: Churchlands
  - Federal division: Curtin

Area
  - Total: 1.9 km^{2} (0.73 sq mi)

Population
  - Total: 4,551 (SAL 2021)
- Time zone: AWST
- Postcode: 6018
Suburbs around Woodlands
| Doubleview | Innaloo | Osborne Park |
| Scarborough | Woodlands | Herdsman, Glendalough |
| Wembley Downs | Churchlands | Wembley |

Woodlands is a suburb of Perth, Western Australia. Its local government area is the City of Stirling and it is in the federal Division of Curtin.

The name "Woodlands" came from the original subdividers of the land, as at the time there were several streets in the area with "wood" in their names. Since then, even more streets are named after trees, such as athel, birch(wood), blackbutt, cedar, cherry, clematis, elm(wood), hakea, hazel, laurel, lombardy, marlock, oak(wood), pine(wood), rosewood, rowan, sabina, sandalwood, tamarisk, teak(wood), valencia and willow.

== History ==
Part of the area that is now Woodlands was originally assigned to Thomas William Mews in 1831, but he could not fulfil the required duties and the grant passed to TRC Walters in 1840. It was later part of the original Woodlands Estate owned by John Daniel Manning.

In 1842 the locality was named "Jackadup", the Aboriginal name for the area. This was later adapted to "Jackadder Lake", which is still the name of the lake in Woodlands.

The Manning family acquired the land around the lake before 1900 and later established a dairy. The dairy was later leased to Robert Bruce who expanded it into one of the largest in the district.

Woodlands is one of Perth's original northern suburbs, and development started in the 1960s. Lake View Rd (now Huntriss Rd) was developed in 1964, and at this time there were no houses between it and Jackadder Lake. Jim Graham was the builder who made many of the original 1960s homes in this street on blocks approximately a fifth of an acre. Many of the homes were purchased for amounts between £3000 and £4000.

The area was surrounded by many bush land areas. Pearson St housed stables, a battery and market gardens. Floreat was the nearest developed suburb and locals tended to shop at Floreat Forum which was then home to the department store Moores. Churchlands was largely undeveloped except for the high school and Herdsman Lake was house free at this time, and remained so until the 1980s.

The Floreat Lakes Estate to the south east was subdivided in 1991.

Woodlands for many years was in the Floreat electorate (now Churchlands), and Andrew Mensaros was the member for many years.

Woodlands Village provided essentials and was home to Freecorns, a butcher, a school uniform shop, and for a time a Shell petrol station.

Woodlands Primary School was opened in 1964 with an enrolment of only 53 students in a two room structure. Peak enrolment of 609 students was in 1975 in 14 permanent and 3 transportable classrooms.

Liege St has seen many changes over the years, including the development of a putt putt course to a retirement village.

Around 1980 a man made island was formed in Jackadder Lake to provide a safe have for nesting wildlife. Many of the trees at the lake were planted by Woodlands Primary School students, who were made tree wardens.

== Recreation ==
Woodlands is well serviced by parks and reserves. The most significant open space surrounds Jackadder Lake. Jackadder Lake was first recorded as "Mews Lake" in 1831 and provides a local recreation area. Jackadder Lake has also been used for radio controlled boats since at least 1970, and is now the primary venue of the Perth Radio Sailing Club.

There are several smaller parks in the locality, including Sweeting Reserve and Woodlands Reserve.

== Education ==
Woodlands contains two primary schools - the private Holy Rosary Catholic Primary School established in 1959, and the government Woodlands Primary School established in 1964.

=== Woodlands Primary School ===
Woodlands Primary School is a government school located at 7 Bentwood Avenue.

It was opened in February 1964, starting with an enrolment of only 53 students in a two room structure. In 1975, the peak enrolment of 609 students was reached, at which time there were 14 permanent and 3 transportable classrooms. There were up to three classes in each year level from Grade 1 to 7; class sizes ranged generally from 30 to 36 students. Mr Larkin was principal for much of this period. Students walked to school and there was no traffic problems in the area at this time.

In 1976 Pre Primary classes started "off site" in Tamarisk Way. Originally there was a walkway between houses from Castle Rd to Tamarisk Way, but this was closed due to repeated noise complaints and the walkway land was offered for sale to the adjoining residents. Pre Primary classes were moved to the main school site in 1993. Kindergarten classes started in 2006.

In 2011, Woodlands Primary became an Independent Public School.

=== Holy Rosary Catholic Primary School ===
Holy Rosary Catholic Primary School is located at 35 Williamstown Road, and opened in February 1959 staffed by Sisters of the Dominican Order.

== Places of Worship ==
- Our Lady of the Rosary Catholic Church (opened 1973)
- Community of Christ Perth Congregation

== Facilities ==
The neighbourhood retail area is called "Woodlands Village" and is located in the centre of the suburb. Ribbon development along Scarborough Beach Road in the north of Woodlands forms part of the Stirling Regional Centre and supplements local shopping.

The locality also contains a retirement village, while entertainment is provided by Event Cinemas on Liege Street.

== Transport ==
=== Bus ===
- 84 Perth Busport to City Beach
- 410 Karrinyup Bus Station to Stirling Station
- 412 Stirling Station to Karrinyup Bus Station
- 420 Surf CAT Stirling Station to Scarborough Beach Bus Station
- 990 Perth Busport to Scarborough Beach Bus Station
- 998 Fremantle Station to Fremantle Station (limited stops) – CircleRoute Clockwise, serves Stirling Station, Cedric Street and Karrinyup Road
- 999 Fremantle Station to Fremantle Station (limited stops) – CircleRoute Anti-Clockwise, serves Karrinyup Road, Cedric Street and Stirling Station
