= Jackadder Lake =

Lake in Perth, Australia

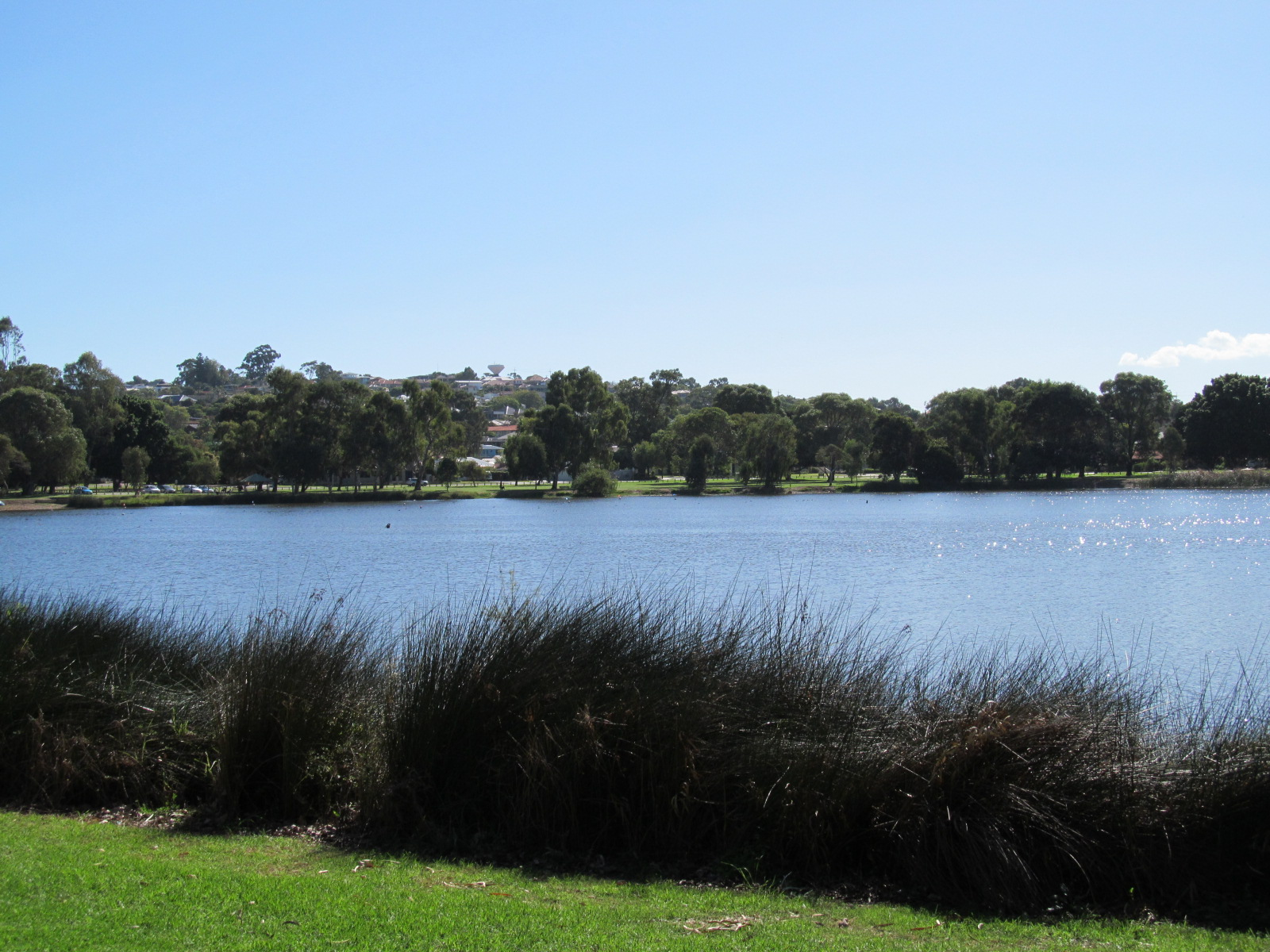
- Interactive map of Jackadder Lake
- Location: Woodlands, Western Australia
- Coordinates: 31°54′24.8″S 115°47′38.6″E
- Type: Freshwater
- Basin countries: Australia
- Islands: 1

Jackadder Lake is a freshwater lake in Perth, Western Australia. It is located in the northern suburb of Woodlands.

The lake has been considered the primary venue for model yacht sailing of the Perth Radio Sailing Club since 1970.

== Description ==
The lake has an area of 7 ha—surrounded by a 13.8 ha public park—and is shallow, ranging in depths of up to 2 meters. An island is present about 40 meters off of the shore.

== History ==
The lake was known as Mews Lake in 1831, after Thomas Mews who owned a grant to the land. By 1842 it was renamed to Jacadup, the Aboriginal name for the area, before later being changed to Jackadder Lake. The meaning of the Aboriginal term may derive from the Nyoongar word 'Djakat", an edible, perrenial root which grows in such wetlands.

In 1900, a small cottage and dairy was built around the lake, the latter of which was largely expanded into "one of the largest in the district".
