= Joondanna, Western Australia =

Joondanna Perth, Western Australia
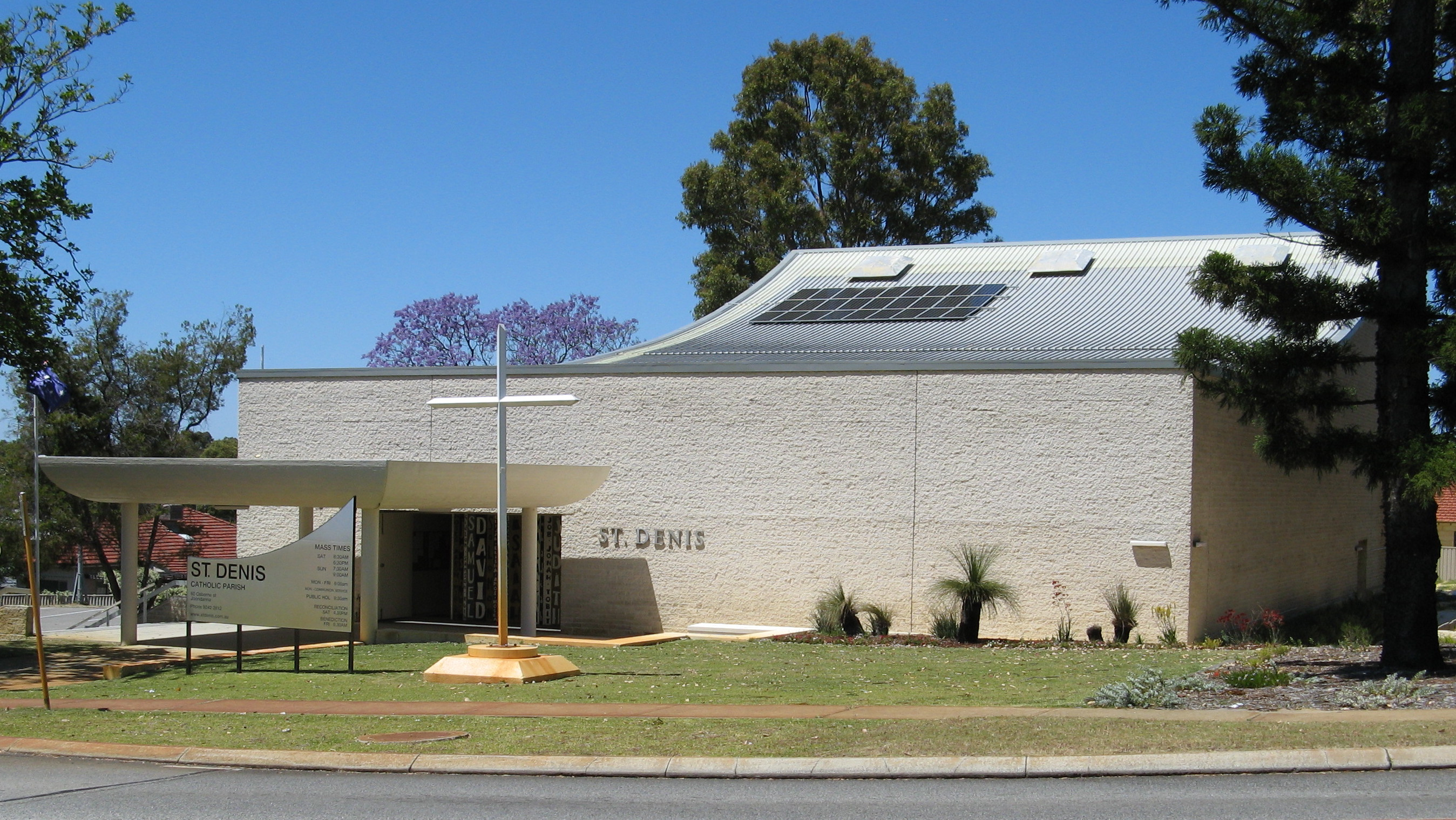
- St Denis Church, Joondanna
- Coordinates: 31.91°S 115.836°E
- Population: 5,283 (SAL 2021)
- Postcode(s): 6060
- Area: 1.4 km^{2} (0.5 sq mi)
- Location: 6 km (4 mi) N of Perth CBD
- LGA(s): City of Stirling
- State electorate(s): Balcatta
- Federal division(s): Perth
Suburbs around Joondanna:
Osborne Park	Tuart Hill	Yokine
Osborne Park	Joondanna	Coolbinia
Glendalough	Mount Hawthorn	North Perth

Joondanna is a suburb in Perth, Western Australia. Its local government area is the City of Stirling. There is a Catholic church, St Denis, and a small Catholic primary school, St Denis School, named after the church. Joondanna is named after a farm said to be owned by an early settler in the area.

Joondanna Heights was the first declared township in the Perth Road District (now the City of Stirling) - the Government Gazette of 17 November 1939 described its boundaries as Balcatta Beach Road (now North Beach Drive, Tuart Hill), Main Street, Wanneroo Road, and what was then the City of Perth boundary (Green Street, now the City of Vincent boundary). Joondanna's neighbouring suburbs are Yokine, Coolbinia, North Perth, Mount Hawthorn, Glendalough, Osborne Park, and Tuart Hill.

Footballer Chris Judd lived in Joondanna when he played for the West Coast Eagles, and Paralympian Louise Sauvage grew up in the suburb.
