= Landscope =

- Discipline: Conservation
- Language: English

Publication details
- History: 1985 to present
- Publisher: Department of Biodiversity, Conservation and Attractions (Western Australia) (Australia)
- Frequency: Quarterly

Standard abbreviations
- ISO 4: Landscope

Indexing
- ISSN: 0815-4465

Links
- Journal homepage

Landscope is the quarterly journal of Western Australia's Department of Biodiversity, Conservation and Attractions. It publishes technical and popular articles on matters related to the conservation and management of natural resources in Western Australia.

First published in 1985, the magazine was partially a continuation of S.W.A.N.S.: State Wildlife Advisory News Service, a newsletter of Western Australia's Department of Fisheries and Fauna. As of early 2019 there have been 34 volumes.
