= Doubleview, Western Australia =

Doubleview
- Suburb
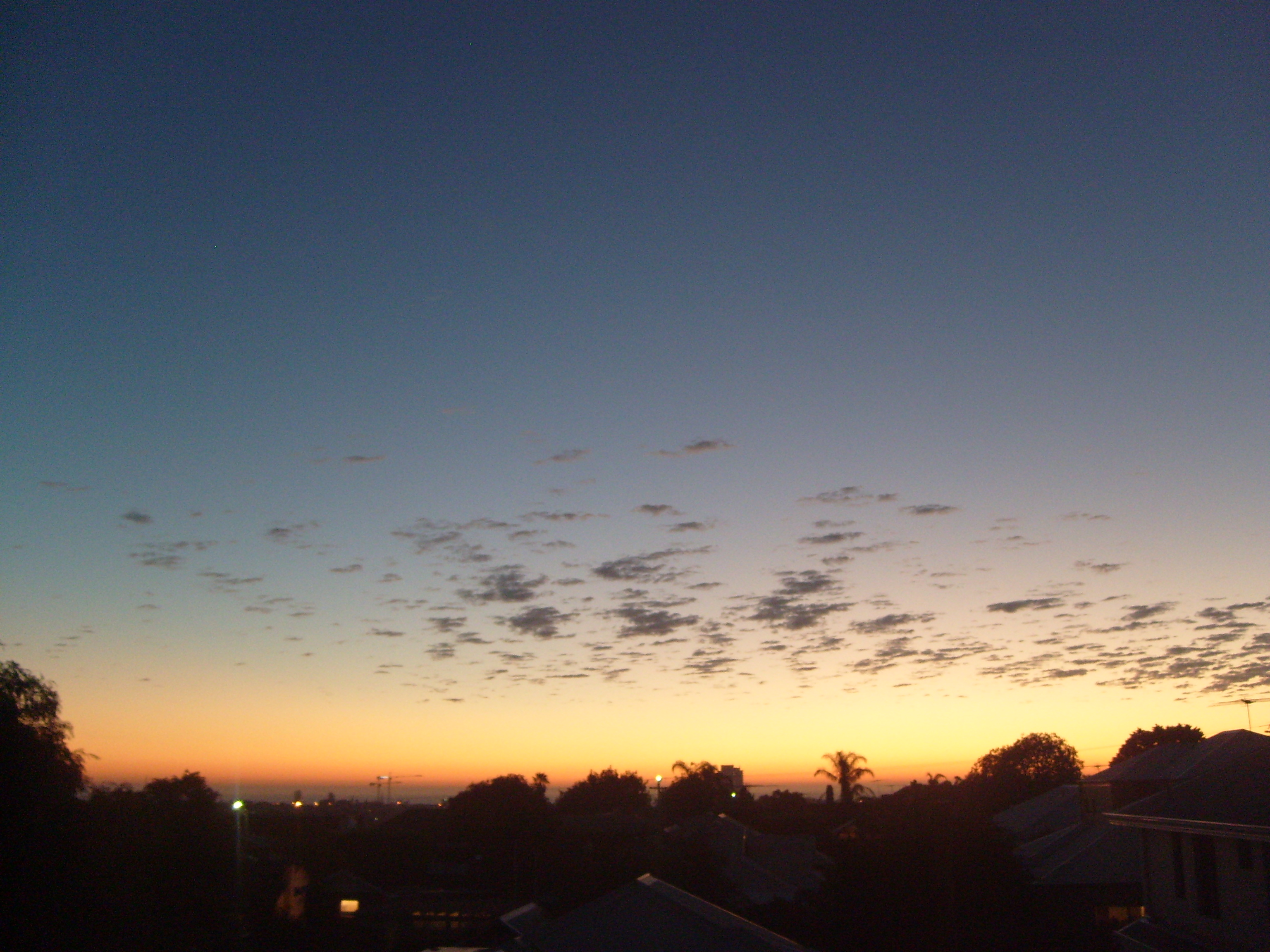
- Looking over the west side towards the beach from Doubleview hill
- Interactive map of Doubleview
- Coordinates: 31.896°S 115.780°E
- Country: Australia
- State: Western Australia
- City: Perth
- LGA: City of Stirling
- Location: 11 km (6.8 mi) NW of Perth

Government
  - State electorate: Scarborough, Churchlands
  - Federal division: Curtin

Area
  - Total: 2.5 km^{2} (0.97 sq mi)

Population
  - Total: 9,205 (SAL 2021)
- Postcode: 6018
Suburbs around Doubleview
Karrinyup	Karrinyup	Innaloo
Scarborough	Doubleview	Innaloo
Wembley Downs	Wembley Downs	Woodlands

Doubleview is a suburb of Perth, Western Australia in the local government area of the City of Stirling. It was named Doubleview due to its views of both the Indian Ocean to the west and the Darling Range to the east.

== Location ==
Doubleview lies between Scarborough to the west and Innaloo to the east on the heavily trafficked Scarborough Beach Road. It is bordered by Newborough Street to the North, Grand Promenade to the West, Williamstown Road to the South, and Huntriss Road to the East. Its main roads are Sackville Terrace and Scarborough Beach Road.

== History ==
In 1895, the land was occupied by John Daniel Manning (1814-1895), an English-born dairy farmer, shortly before his death. In 1910, a real estate investor called Charles Edgar Stoneman purchased the land and started selling it in subdivisions. He used the same street names used in the centre of Perth, leading buyers to believe they were purchasing land there. In 1916, a real estate developer called M. L. Connor purchased the Southern portion of Doubleview and started selling it in subdivisions. After he failed to sell many, it was purchased by a team of real estate developers, Dudley and Dwyer, in 1926. They were the ones who coined the name 'Doubleview.' However, the land subdivisions failed to sell again.

Shortly after the Second World War, the Western Australian government built houses for returning soldiers in the Northern section of Doubleview. Those first houses were built in timber-frame. More recently, houses have been built using brick and tile. It has remained a predominantly residential area.

== Education ==
Doubleview contains one state primary school, Doubleview Primary School, located at 203 St Brigid's Terrace.

The International School of Western Australia opened in 2008 and is located at 193 St Brigid's Terrace. It teaches the International Baccalaureate curriculum.

The Catholic Institute of Western Australia is located in the Newman Siena Centre at 33 Williamstown Road. It is a tertiary educational body providing courses in Catholic Education.

The Siena Girls' High School was formerly operated by the Dominican Sisters in Doubleview from 1962 before being amalgamated into Newman College in 1976.

== Churches ==
- The Perth Chinese Christian Church is located at 146 Flamborough Street.
- A meeting house of the Church of Jesus Christ of Latter-day Saints is located at 71 Princess Road.
- Doubleview Parish of the Catholic Archdiocese of Perth is located in the neighbouring suburb of Woodlands

== Public parks ==
Doubleview contains several public parks:

- Bradley Reserve.
- Munro Reserve.
- Bennett Park.

== Transport ==
=== Bus ===
- 412 Stirling Station to Karrinyup Bus Station
- 420 Surf CAT Stirling Station to Scarborough Beach Bus Station
- 421 Stirling Station to Scarborough Beach Bus Station
- 422 Stirling Station to Scarborough Beach Bus Station
- 990 Perth Busport to Scarborough Beach Bus Station
