= Mount Hawthorn, Western Australia =

Mount Hawthorn
- Suburb
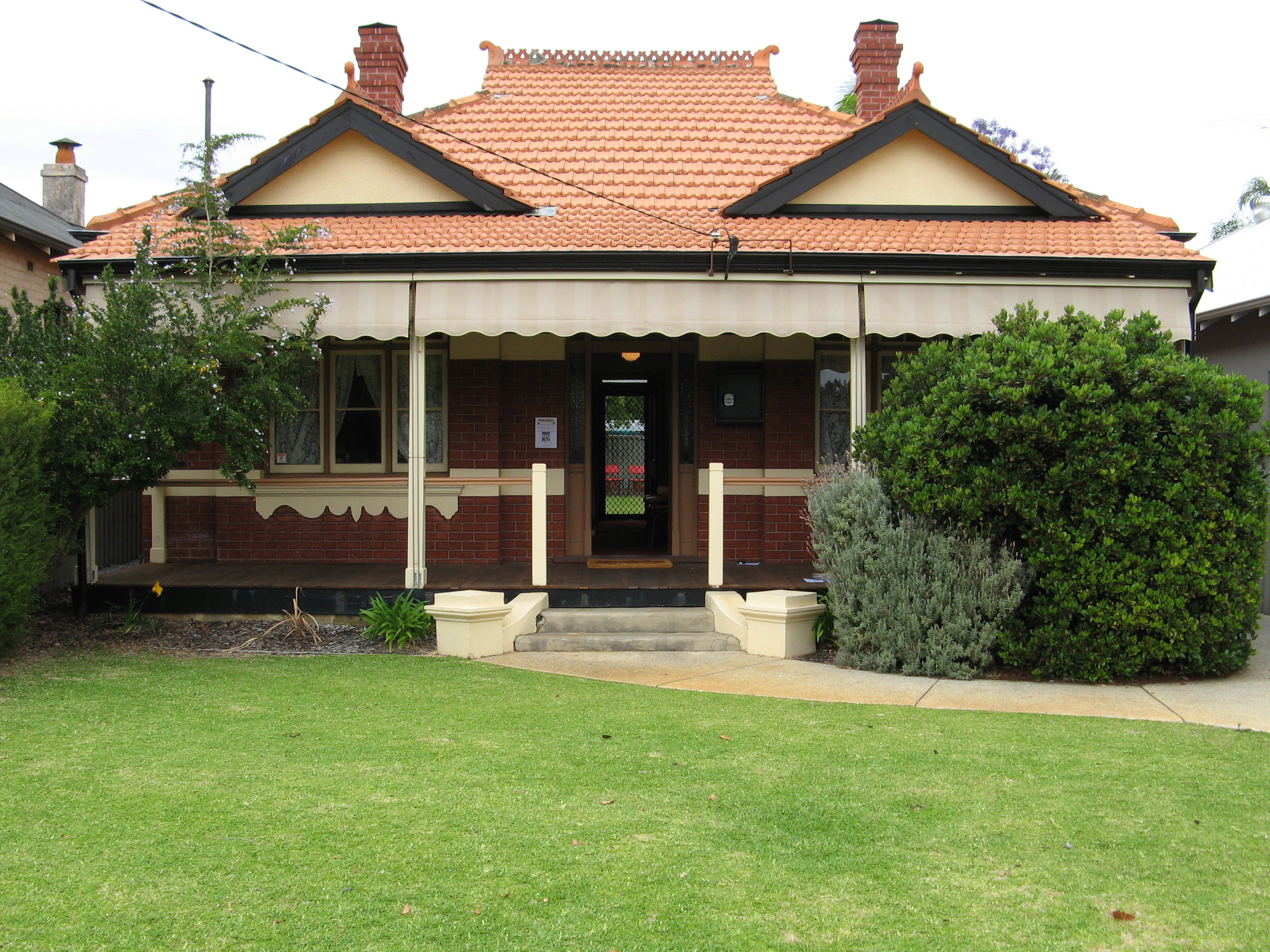
- Anzac Cottage, Mount Hawthorn
- Interactive map of Mount Hawthorn
- Coordinates: 31.921°S 115.838°E
- Country: Australia
- State: Western Australia
- City: Perth
- LGA: City of Vincent
- Location: 5 km (3.1 mi) N of Perth CBD
- Established: 1903

Government
  - State electorate: Perth
  - Federal division: Perth

Area
  - Total: 2.1 km^{2} (0.81 sq mi)

Population
  - Total: 8,183 (SAL 2021)
- Postcode: 6016
Suburbs around Mount Hawthorn
Osborne Park	Joondanna	Joondanna
Glendalough	Mount Hawthorn	North Perth
Wembley	Leederville	North Perth

Mount Hawthorn is a suburb of Perth, Western Australia, located within the City of Vincent.

The Mount Hawthorn area was first selected for urban development in 1887. In the late 1890s part of it was purchased by a syndicate of Edward Wittenoom, a politician and pastoralist; James Hicks and C. L. W. Clifton. When this group subdivided their land in 1903, Hicks called his portion of the subdivision Hawthorn Estate, as he had recently been in Melbourne and stayed at Hawthorn.

Over recent times the area has become a desirable inner-city suburb, attracting young families with its numerous parks, cafes, bars and restaurants. Opened in 1906, Mount Hawthorn Primary School is one of Western Australia's ten largest primary schools, with close to a thousand registered students. The school recently unveiled a mural in honour of WA's first qualified female Aboriginal teacher, May O’Brien.

== World War I heritage ==
- A notable former resident was war hero Thomas Axford, a recipient of the Victoria Cross (in 1918) and the Military Medal. "Axford Park", opposite the intersection of Scarborough Beach Road and Oxford Street, is named in his honour.
- Anzac Cottage, the house at 38 Kalgoorlie Street, was built by local tradespeople in the space of 24 hours on 12 February 1916, to house returned veterans as well as to honour those lost in action. The first to live here were Private John Porter, a wounded Gallipoli veteran, and his wife. His lost mate, 19-year-old Leslie Wilkinson (killed in action at Gallipoli on 28 June 1915) is also honoured on a small plaque on the flagpole in front of the cottage.
