= Herdsman, Western Australia =

Herdsman
- Suburb
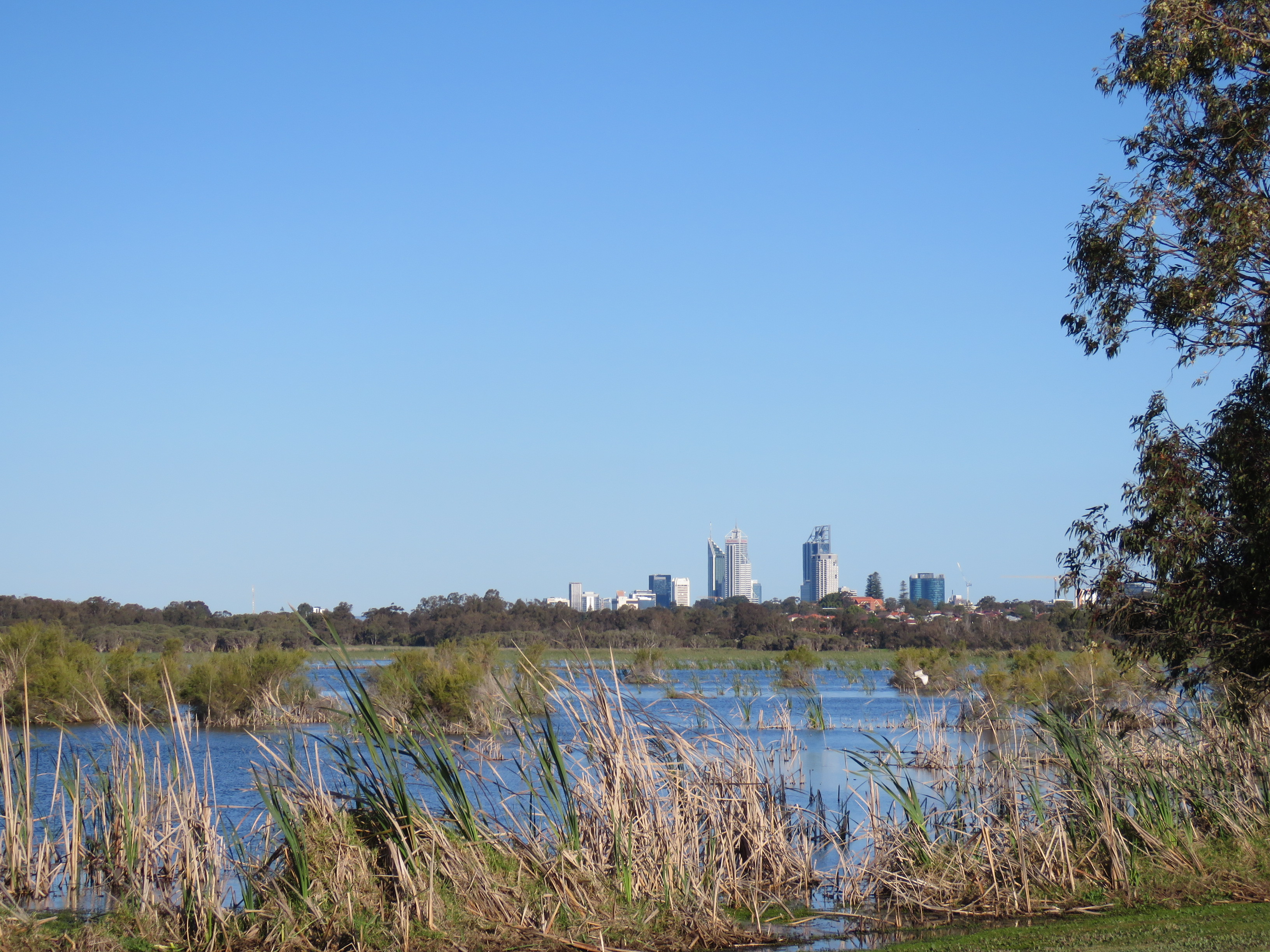
- The western shore of Herdsman Lake with the skyline of Perth in the background
- Interactive map of Herdsman
- Coordinates: 31.921°S 115.804°E
- Country: Australia
- State: Western Australia
- City: Perth
- LGA: City of Stirling
- Location: 7 km (4.3 mi) NW of Perth CBD

Government
  - State electorate: Scarborough, Churchlands
  - Federal division: Curtin

Population
  - Total: 0 (SAL 2016)
- Postcode: 6017
Suburbs around Herdsman
Woodlands	Osborne Park	Osborne Park
Churchlands	Herdsman	Glendalough
Churchlands	Wembley	Wembley

Herdsman is the suburb of Perth, Western Australia where Herdsman Lake and the surrounding Herdsman Lake Regional Park are situated. Its local government area is the City of Stirling.

In the earlier days of settlement, cattle were raised near the lake area. In 1928, the Herdsman Lake Suburban Area was gazetted adjacent to the lake, covering parts of what are now Churchlands and Woodlands as well as the modern suburb of Herdsman.

In the 1980s swamp-land to the north of the lake was reclaimed by dredging to build Jon Sanders Drive and establish a light industrial park around Walters Drive. Prior to this, companies along Scarborough Beach Road backed on to the swamp. That area is now part of the light industrial suburb of Osborne Park, although some areas adjacent to Herdsman Lake Regional Park are still colloquially referred to as "Herdsman".
