= Division of Curtin =

Australian federal electoral division

Coordinates: 31.957°S 115.796°E

Curtin Australian House of Representatives Division
- Interactive map of electorate boundaries from the 2025 federal election
- Created: 1949
- MP: Kate Chaney
- Party: Independent
- Namesake: John Curtin
- Electors: 119,397 (2022)
- Area: 98 km^{2} (37.8 sq mi)
- Demographic: Inner metropolitan
Electorates around Curtin:
Indian Ocean	Moore	Perth
Indian Ocean	Curtin	Perth
Indian Ocean	Fremantle	Tangney

The Division of Curtin is an Australian electoral division in Western Australia.

== History ==
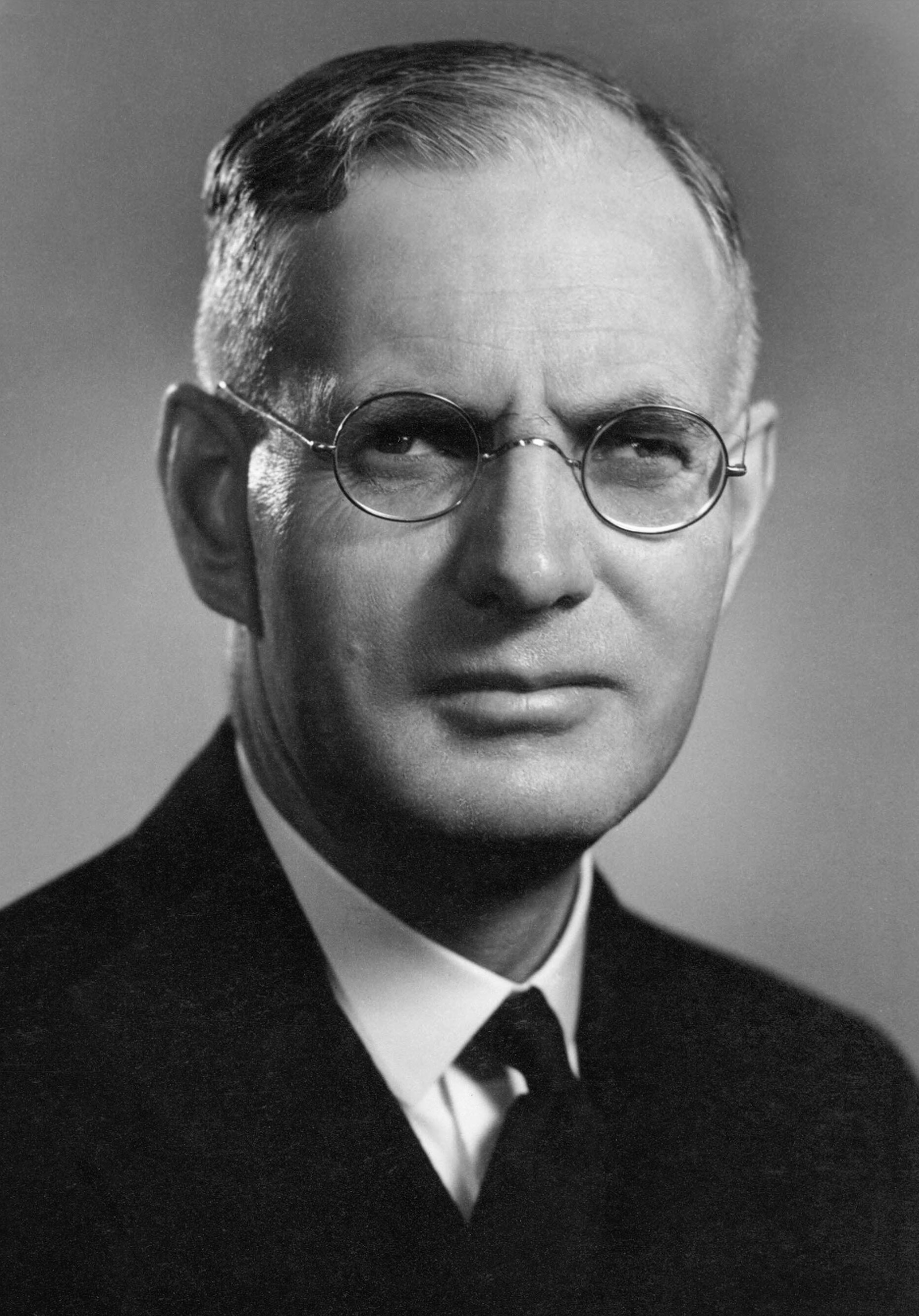
John Curtin, the division's namesake

The division was created in 1949 and is named for John Curtin, who was Prime Minister of Australia from 1941 to 1945. Prior to its creation, much of this area was part of the Division of Fremantle, which Curtin represented for all but one term from 1928 to 1945. It is located in the wealthy beachside suburbs of Perth, including Claremont, Cottesloe, Mosman Park, Nedlands, Subiaco and Swanbourne.

It was created as a notional Labor seat. However, this area was located in naturally Liberal territory, and the Liberals won it resoundingly as part of their massive victory in the 1949 election, turning it into a safe Liberal seat in one stroke. It was held by a Liberal or a conservative independent for the next 73 years, and for most of that time was considered the most conservative seat in Perth. The Liberals' hold on the seat was only remotely threatened twice during this period. In 1983, Allan Rocher suffered a swing of over seven percent in his bid for a full term, dropping the Liberal margin from a safe 11 percent to a marginal four percent. Even then, Rocher won a majority on the first count.

In 1996, Rocher lost Liberal preselection, but retained the seat as an independent. Rocher was defeated at the 1998 election, when Julie Bishop reclaimed it for the Liberals.

Its most prominent member was the first, Paul Hasluck, who was a senior Cabinet minister in the Menzies and Holt governments and then Governor-General of Australia after leaving politics. Other prominent members include Victor Garland, a minister in the McMahon and Fraser governments, and Bishop, the former Deputy Leader of the Liberal Party (the first woman to hold this role) and a minister in the Howard, Abbott, and Turnbull governments.

Bishop retired at the 2019 election, and Celia Hammond, a former vice chancellor of University of Notre Dame Australia, retained it for the Liberals with a reduced majority. With a two-party preferred margin of 14.3 percent, it was the fifth-safest Coalition seat in metropolitan Australia.

However, at the 2022 election, Hammond lost over 11 percent of her primary vote, and lost the seat to teal independent Kate Chaney, granddaughter of former Liberal minister Fred Chaney Sr. and niece of former Liberal minister Fred Chaney Jr. Chaney was one of several teals who took wealthy blue ribbon inner-city seats off the Liberals. The swing against the Liberals was large enough to make Curtin marginal against Labor in a "traditional" two-party matchup for only the second time in its history.

== Geography ==
Since 1984, federal electoral division boundaries in Australia have been determined at redistributions by a redistribution committee appointed by the Australian Electoral Commission. Redistributions occur for the boundaries of divisions in a particular state, and they occur every seven years, or sooner if a state's representation entitlement changes or when divisions of a state are malapportioned.

In August 2021, the Australian Electoral Commission (AEC) announced that Curtin would gain the remainder of the suburb of Scarborough and parts of Gwelup, Karrinyup and Trigg from the abolished seat of Stirling. These boundary changes took place as of the 2022 election.

Curtin covers an area west of Perth, bordered by the Indian Ocean in the west and the Swan River in the south. The suburbs include:

- Churchlands
- City Beach
- Claremont
- Cottesloe
- Crawley
- Daglish
- Dalkeith
- Doubleview
- Floreat
- Glendalough
- Gwelup (part)
- Herdsman
- Innaloo
- Jolimont
- Karrakatta
- Karrinyup (part)
- Mount Claremont
- Mosman Park
- Osborne Park (part)
- Nedlands
- Peppermint Grove
- Scarborough
- Shenton Park
- Swanbourne
- Subiaco
- Trigg (part)
- West Leederville
- Wembley
- Wembley Downs
- Woodlands

== Members ==
Image	Member	Party	Term	Notes
	Paul Hasluck (1905–1993)	Liberal	10 December 1949 – 10 February 1969	Served as minister under Menzies, Holt, McEwen and Gorton. Resigned to become Governor-General of Australia
	Victor Garland (1934–2022)	Liberal	19 April 1969 – 22 January 1981	Served as minister under McMahon and Fraser. Resigned to become the High Commissioner to the United Kingdom
	Allan Rocher (1936–2016)	Liberal	21 February 1981 – 7 August 1995	Previously a member of the Senate. Lost seat
	Allan Rocher (1936–2016)	Independent	7 August 1995 – 3 October 1998	Previously a member of the Senate. Lost seat
	Julie Bishop (1956–)	Liberal	3 October 1998 – 11 April 2019	Served as minister under Howard, Abbott and Turnbull. Retired
	Celia Hammond (1968–)	Liberal	18 May 2019 – 21 May 2022	Lost seat
	Kate Chaney (1975–)	Independent	21 May 2022 – present	Incumbent

== Election results ==
2025 Australian federal election: Curtin
Party	Candidate	Votes	%	±%
Liberal	Tom White	42,436	40.28	−1.08
Independent	Kate Chaney	33,952	32.23	+2.51
Labor	Viktor Ko	15,626	14.83	+1.08
Greens	Kitty Hemsley	8,235	7.82	−2.53
One Nation	Alexander Ironside	2,731	2.59	+1.38
Legalise Cannabis	Fred Mulholland	2,368	2.25	+2.25
Total formal votes		105,348	98.32	+1.40
Informal votes		1,805	1.68	−1.40
Turnout		107,153	91.39	+1.24
Notional two-party-preferred count
Liberal	Tom White	54,949	52.16	−3.48
Labor	Viktor Ko	50,399	47.84	+3.48
Two-candidate-preferred result
Independent	Kate Chaney	56,118	53.27	+1.95
Liberal	Tom White	49,230	46.73	−1.95
Independent hold		Swing	+1.95	
