= Glendalough, Western Australia =

Glendalough
- Suburb
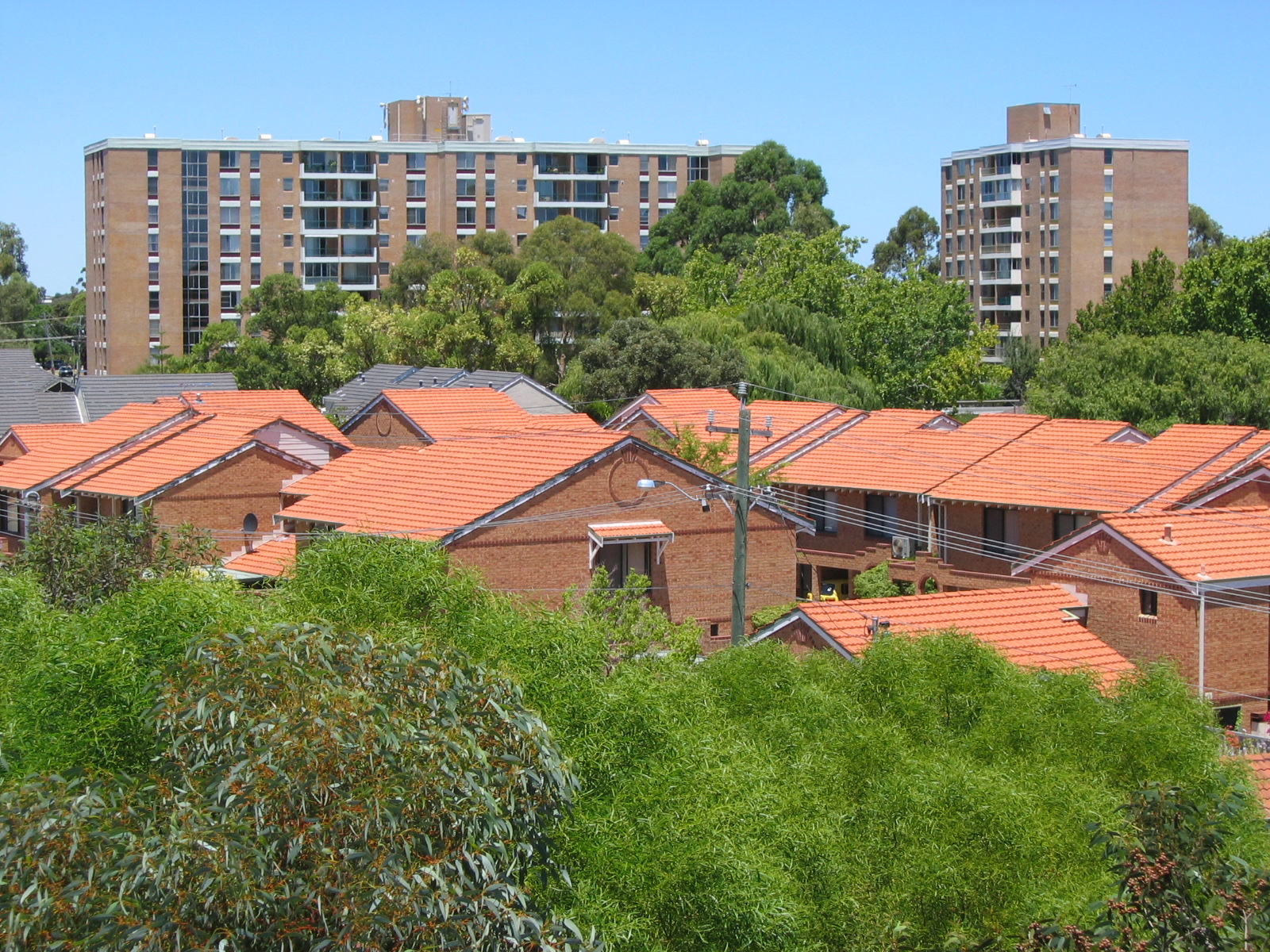
- Apartments at Leeder Street, Glendalough
- Interactive map of Glendalough
- Coordinates: 31.919°S 115.820°E
- Country: Australia
- State: Western Australia
- City: Perth
- LGA: City of Stirling
- Location: 5 km (3.1 mi) NW of Perth CBD

Government
  - State electorate: Churchlands
  - Federal division: Curtin

Area
  - Total: 0.7 km^{2} (0.27 sq mi)

Population
  - Total: 2,628 (SAL 2021)
- Postcode: 6016
Suburbs around Glendalough
Herdsman	Osborne Park	Joondanna
Wembley	Glendalough	Mount Hawthorn
Wembley	Wembley	Mount Hawthorn

Glendalough (/ˈɡlɛndəloʊ/ GLEN-də-loh; also /ˈɡlɛndəlɒx/ GLEN-də-lokh) is a suburb of Perth, Western Australia in the local government area of the City of Stirling, about 6 kilometres from Perth's central business district along the Mitchell Freeway. It was named after the Catholic hermitage of Glendalough in Ireland, meaning "valley of two lakes," in reference to the nearby Herdsman Lake and Galup.

== History ==
=== Indigenous history ===
The area that is now Glendalough was part of the greater Perth Wetlands. The wetlands, especially around Herdsman Lake (Njookenbooro) and Galup were of particular importance to the Noongar people as a source of food and fresh water. The area was used as a camping ground and meeting place at least until the 1920s.

=== European settlement ===
After the establishment of the Swan River Colony in 1829, much of the wetlands were drained to provide the colony with farming land. The land between Herdsman Lake and Galup, part of which is now Glendalough, was reserved so that a connection between the two lakes could be constructed should the colony ever need additional fresh water. This reservation was later revoked after construction of a canal between the two lakes was deemed impossible.

In 1837, the land was released for sale and a crown grant for what is now Glendalough and part of Herdsman Lake was given to Thomas Helms, a prominent businessman in the early days of the colony. Helms named his property "Helmsville" and the area was known by this name until 1882. The land was developed as a farm to be passed down to his son Henry. Henry committed suicide in 1843 and the land was never occupied by the Helms family.

=== Influence of the Catholic church ===
In 1883, a 1094 acre grant for a roughly circular region centred on Herdsman Lake and extending to the north of Galup was given to Bishop Martin Griver. Following Griver's death in 1886, the land was acquired by Bishop Matthew Gibney in 1887. Around this time, the area began to be referred to by various names including "New Subiaco" and "Church Lands".

Various Catholic orders began to establish themselves in the area. A Benedictine monastery was founded by Giuseppe (Joseph) Serra of New Norcia next to Herdsman Lake in 1858, containing a vineyard, orchard and olive grove. In 1894, at the request of Bishop Gibney, the Oblates of Mary Immaculate came to Western Australia from Ireland and founded Saint Kevin's Industrial School, a school set up to rehabilitate destitute boys. They were given 300 acres east of Herdsman Lake to the north of Galup, closely corresponding to the modern boundaries of Glendalough. The school was opened by Sir John Forrest in 1898. The Oblates were the first to refer to the area as Glendalough, after the Irish monastery founded by Kevin of Glendalough with similar scenery.

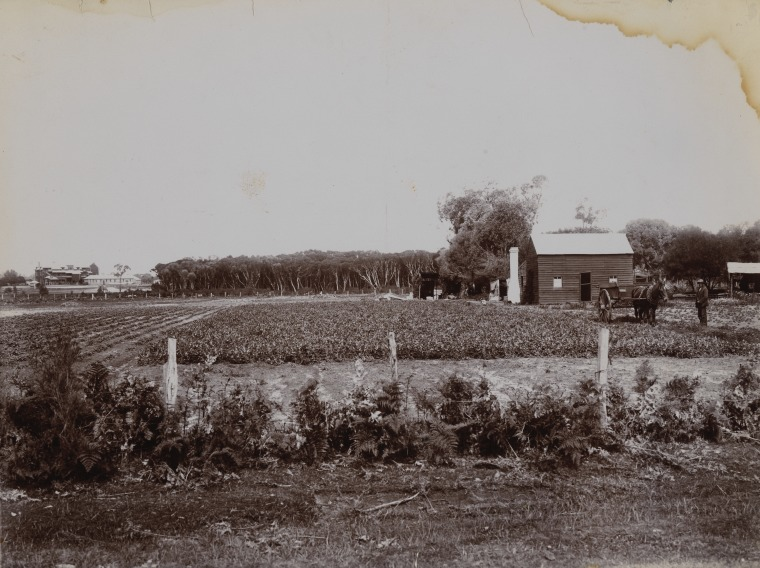
A Chinese market garden in Glendalough with St Kevin's Industrial School visible in background (1912)

Much of the rest of the land began to be leased to Chinese market gardeners including land close to the current Glendalough Railway Station. Around this time the Lyall Hall country club was also established by Fredrick and Isobel Thomas near the current intersection of Harbourne Street and Scarborough Beach Road. The club contained a trotting track and backed onto Herdsman Lake. A dairy was also operated in the vicinity by the Pianta family. The Oblates and their students worked to drain and clear much of the remaining wetland in Glendalough during this time.

In 1921, Archbishop Patrick Clune gifted 40 acres of land in Glendalough to The Little Sisters of the Poor including the main building of Saint Kevin's Industrial School which had closed a year prior. The Sisters moved there from their previous location on Adelaide Terrace and have been operating at this location ever since.

In 1924, many of the market gardens in the area were closed and demolished for the construction of Harbourne Street. In 1936, the land to the west of Harborne Street was sold off to developer Dudley & Dwyer Ltd.

=== Post-World War II ===
In 1949, the State Housing Commission purchased a part of Glendalough and started developing housing in the area. Five new streets were surveyed with names honoring passengers of the Rockingham: Cato Street, Pollard Street, Powis Street, Leeder Street and Rawlins Street. Glendalough was one of the first developments undertaken by the State Housing Commission after World War II. In July 1954, Glendalough was officially gazetted as a suburb.

In 1958, the Archdiocese of Perth recognised a need for a parish to serve the rapidly growing population of the northern suburbs. The chapel at the Little Sisters of the Poor was deemed unable to support the population under canon law, so it was resolved that a new church would be built. In 1959, Saint Bernadette's Catholic Church and the adjoining primary school were opened, being named by the Mother of the Little Sisters of the Poor.

In 1974, the third stage of Mitchell Freeway was completed, cutting the suburb in half.

In November 1986, Pope John Paul II visited the residents of the Little Sisters of the Poor Glendalough Home where he toured the grounds and gave an address.

In 1993, the Glendalough Railway Station was opened as part of the Northern Suburbs Rail Link.

In July 2007, the part of Glendalough east of Mitchell Freeway was realigned to become part of the City of Vincent. In 2008 it was renamed Mount Hawthorn, amalgamating with that suburb.

== Geography ==
The suburb is bounded by Mitchell Freeway to the east; Jon Sanders Drive and Powis Street to the south; Pollard Street, Cayley Street, Harbourne Street and Parkland Road to the north; and Herdsman Lake to the west.

The area that is now Glendalough is entirely located within a region that was known to early settlers of the Swan River Colony as the Great Lakes District. Prior to European settlement, Glendalough was a low-lying wetland that formed a partially linked system with Herdsman Lake and Galup.

== Demographics ==
At the 2021 Australian Census, Glendalough had a population of 2,628 people living in 1,353 dwellings. The most prevalent reported ancestries are English (20.3%), Bhutanese (18.8%), Australian (13.4%), Indian (11.5%) and Irish (6.3%). 1.6% of the population reports Indigenous status. The Bhutanese population is particularly concentrated in Glendalough and constitutes 12% of the total population in the state, and 4% of the total population in Australia.

The most prevalent languages other than English reported to be spoken at home are other Southern Asian languages (17.2%), Gujarati (8.4%), Nepali (4.0%), Hindi (2.4%), and Mandarin (2.0%). The most prevalent reported religious beliefs are no religion (26.8%), Buddhism (22.8%), Hinduism (17.6%), and Catholicism (12.9%).

== Transport ==
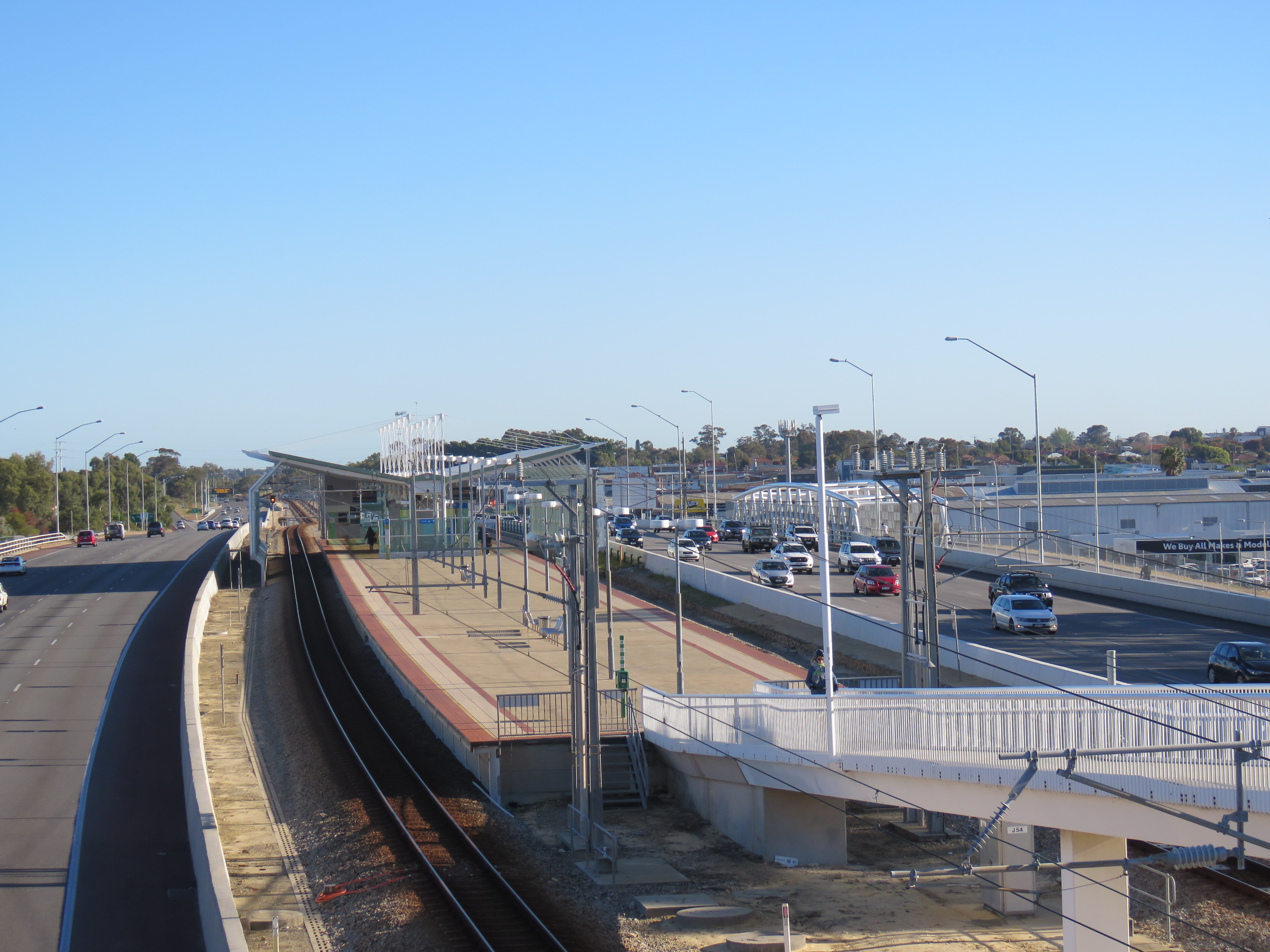
Glendalough railway station seen from the footbridge

=== Bus ===
- 15 Glendalough Station to Perth Busport via Oxford Street
- 85 Glendalough Station to Perth Busport via Cambridge Street and Herdsman Parade
- 95 Glendalough Station to Subiaco Station via Harbourne Street
- 406 Glendalough Station to Mount Lawley via Walcott Street
- 407 Glendalough Station to Glendalough Station via Herdsman Business Park
- 413 Stirling Station to Glendalough Station via Osborne Park
- 414 Stirling Station to Glendalough Station via Balcatta
- 990 Perth Busport to Scarborough Beach Bus Station

=== Rail ===
- Yanchep Line
  - Glendalough Station

=== Light Rail ===
The City of Stirling has proposed a route served by "trackless tram" between Glendalough Station and Scarborough Beach running along Scarborough Beach Road, and in October 2020, a $2 million grant was given by the Australian Government to develop a business case. An autonomous rapid transit (ART) vehicle was delivered to the City of Stirling in October 2023 with trials beginning in November of that same year. This vehicle is the first of its kind to operate in Australia. The business case was completed in October 2024.

== Amenities and facilities ==
The Glendalough Village Shopping Centre is located on the corner of Harbourne Street and Jon Sanders Drive. It contains an IGA supermarket, as well as various small restaurants and other amenities. A general practitioner and dental surgery are also located in the suburb.

The Little Sisters of the Poor Glendalough Home has operated at its premises on Rawlins Street since 1921.

Glendalough borders the Osborne Park Light Industrial Area to the north.

=== Recreation ===
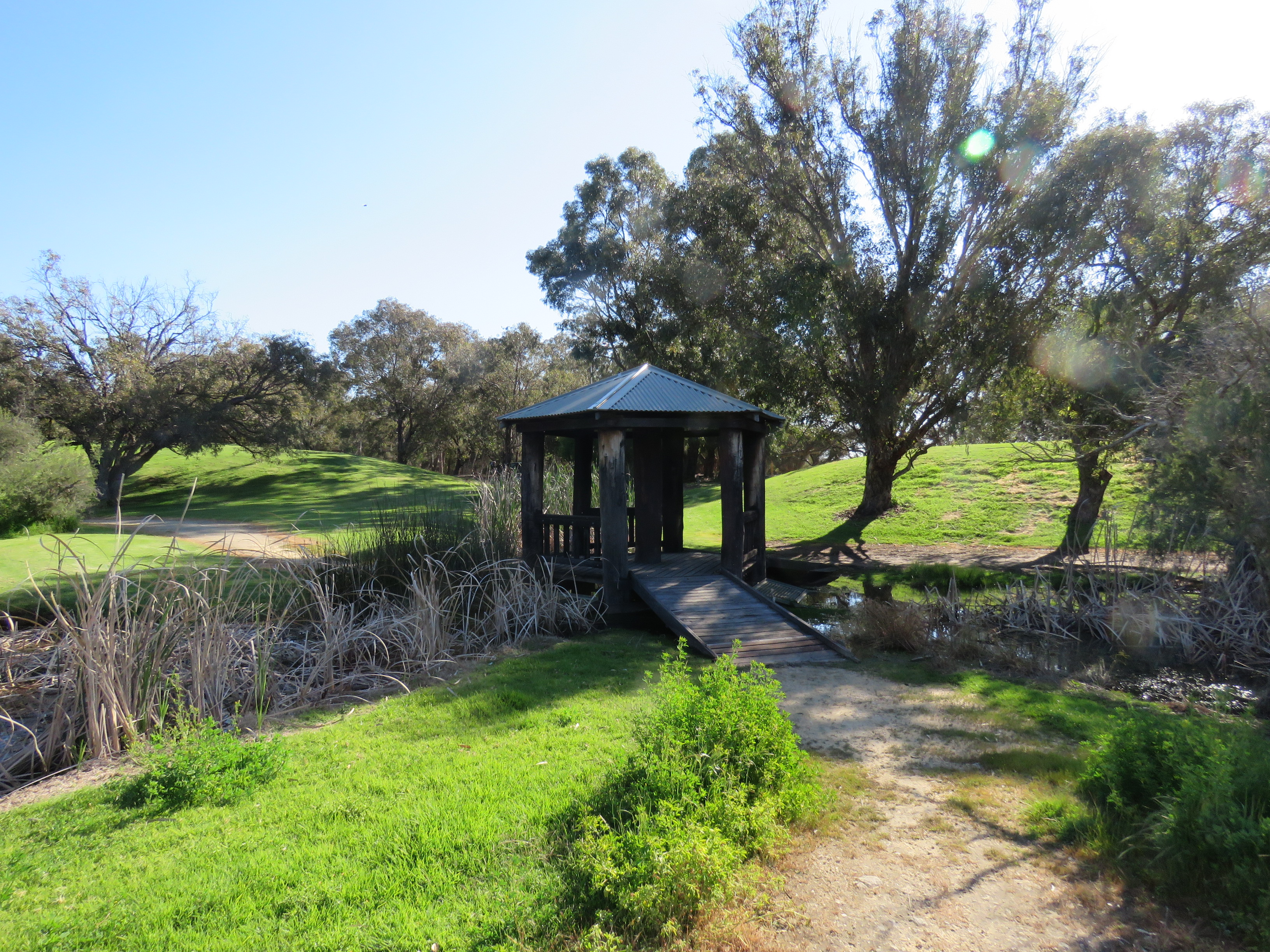
Glendalough Open Space

Glendalough Open Space and Glendalough Reserve are both located within the suburb and are part of the larger Herdsman Lake Regional Park. Cayley Reserve is also located behind houses on Pollard Street and Cayley Street and is a remnant of the larger wetlands system in the area.

Glendalough borders Galup Reserve (formerly Lake Monger Reserve) to the South East.

=== Places of Worship ===
Saint Bernadette's Catholic Church was consecrated and opened in 1959 and is located at 49 Jugan Street in what is now Mount Hawthorn. The parish it is located in is still referred to as the Glendalough Parish by the Archdiocese of Perth, and it continues to serve the suburb.

The Chapel of the Little Sisters of the Poor is located within the grounds of the Little Sisters of the Poor Glendalough Home and was originally opened in 1925 before being consecrated in 1940. It served the residents of this facility until vibrations from the Mitchell Freeway caused the building to deteriorate and required it to be demolished in 2017. The current building was opened and consecrated in 2019.

== Education ==
Since 2017, Glendalough has been located in the public school intake area for Bob Hawke College. Prior to that amendment, the suburb was located in the intake area for Churchlands Senior High School. Glendalough was located in the intake area for City Beach Senior High School prior to its closure in 2005.

Glendalough is located within the intake area for Lake Monger Primary School, an independent public primary school.

Chrysalis Montessori School was established at 5 Parkland Road in 1991. It enrolls students from 18 months to 12 years old.

St. Bernadette's Primary School was a Catholic school that operated from 1959 to 1978 at 39 Jugan Street in what is now Mount Hawthorn. The original school building now houses Bioethicsperth (formerly the L J Goody Bioethics Centre).

Saint Kevin's Industrial and Reformatory School for Roman Catholic Boys was established in Glendalough by the Oblate Brothers in 1897. The school admitted government and private orphans aged up to 16 years old. It closed in 1921 and the buildings were gifted to the Little Sisters of the Poor by Archbishop Clune.
