= Osborne Park, Western Australia =

Osborne Park Perth, Western Australia
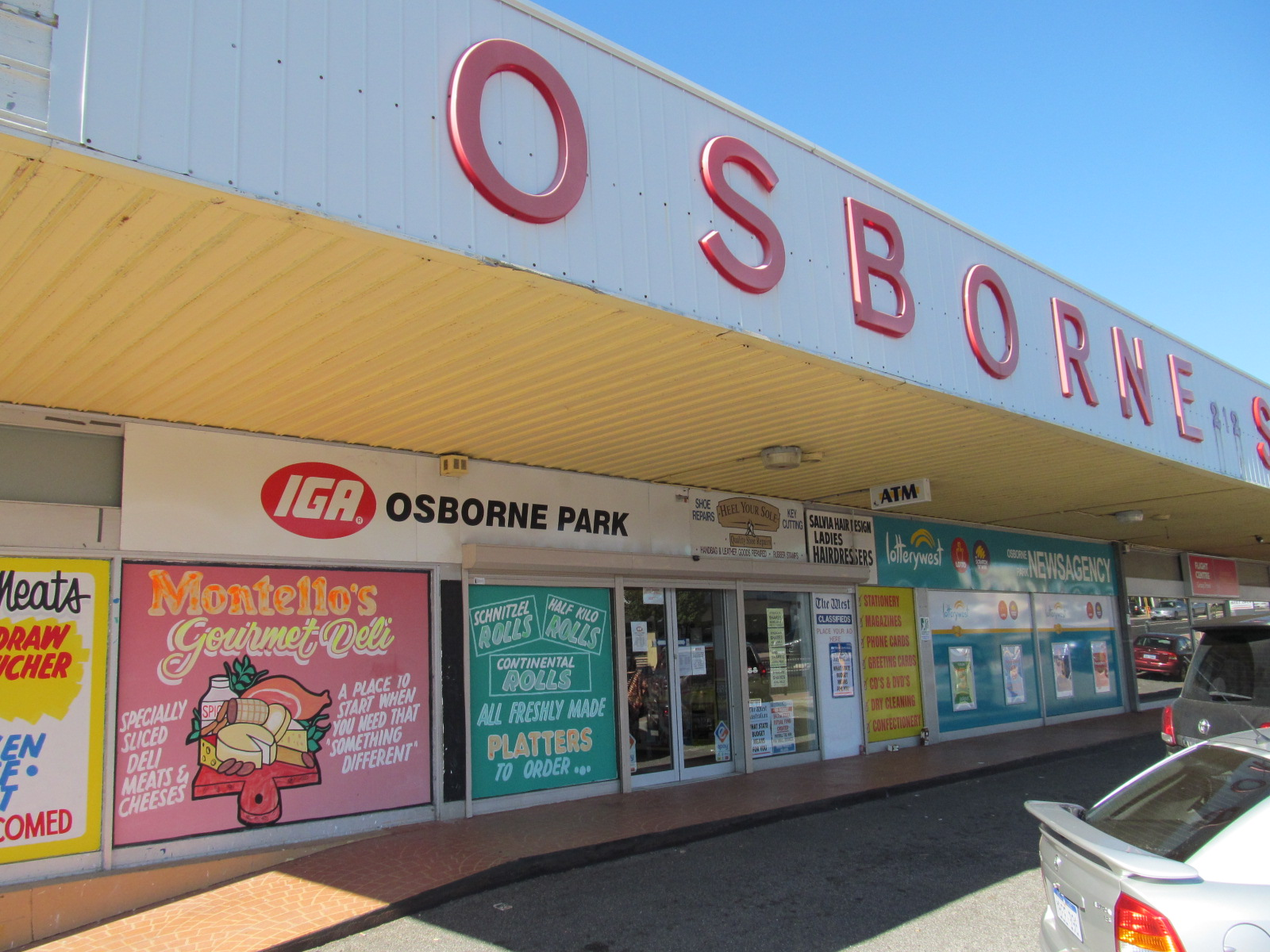
- Osborne Park Shopping Centre
- Coordinates: 31.898°S 115.812°E
- Population: 4,463 (SAL 2021)
- Postcode(s): 6017
- Area: 5.1 km^{2} (2.0 sq mi)
- Location: 8 km (5 mi) NW of Perth CBD
- LGA(s): City of Stirling; City of Vincent
- State electorate(s): Balcatta, Scarborough
- Federal division(s): Curtin, Perth, Cowan
Suburbs around Osborne Park:
Innaloo	Stirling	Balcatta
Woodlands	Osborne Park	Tuart Hill and Joondanna
Herdsman	Glendalough	Mount Hawthorn

Osborne Park is a suburb of Perth, Western Australia in the local government area of the City of Stirling and City of Vincent.

== History ==
Osborne Park was named after William Osborne, a butcher who owned an abattoir and land on Wanneroo Road and who was elected to the Perth Road Board (the City of Stirling's predecessor), in 1875.

Osborne Park was part of an original crown grant of 2,440 hectares (6,020 acres) given to T. R. C. Walters in 1840. After the death of Walters in 1874, William Osborne bought part of his estate, which included the area now known as Osborne Park.

The suburb was originally market gardens, due to rich peaty soil from the swamps between Lake Monger and Herdsman Lake. The area was popular among Chinese, Italian and Yugoslav settlers. The suburb was founded by a private trading concern and had a tram service in the early 1900s through an extension of the Perth tram system from the end of the Leederville line. The suburb is now served by Glendalough train station on the Yanchep line.

Osborne Park became a residential suburb after World War II, but by the 1980s, it was predominantly an industrial area, with only the north-eastern area still residential.

== At present ==
Many warehouses, car yards and small businesses are located in Osborne Park, as well as larger retailers. Scarborough Beach Road consists of the largest car yard precinct in Australia.

Main Street in Osborne Park is the cafe, shopping and business strip, hosting cafes and restaurants. The Osborne Park shopping centre is also open.
