= Wembley, Western Australia =

Wembley
- Suburb
- Interactive map of Wembley
- Coordinates: 31.936°S 115.814°E
- Country: Australia
- State: Western Australia
- City: Perth
- LGA: Town of Cambridge City of Stirling
- Location: 5 km (3.1 mi) WNW of Perth CBD

Government
  - State electorates: Churchlands; Nedlands
  - Federal division: Curtin

Area
  - Total: 4.5 km^{2} (1.7 sq mi)

Population
  - Total: 12,061 (SAL 2021)
- Postcode: 6014
Suburbs around Wembley
Woodlands	Herdsman Lake	Glendalough
Churchlands	Wembley	Leederville
Floreat	Jolimont	Subiaco and West Leederville

Wembley is a western suburb of Perth, Western Australia, located within the Town of Cambridge. Its postcode is 6014.

The main streets in Wembley are Cambridge Street, Harborne Street, Grantham Street and Selby Street. It is an upper middle class, medium-density suburb. Wembley is home to Bold Park Community School, Lake Monger Primary, Wembley Primary School and the Speech and Hearing Centre. Galup is a large lake located on the outer edges of the suburb, which contains an island in the south-west corner known as Monger Island.

The 2021 Census recorded a population of just over 12,000. Wembley was originally inhabited by the Mooro people of the Noongar Aboriginal clan for at least 40,000 years before European settlement. After the arrival of Europeans, Wembley was settled through land grants and purchasing of land by the Catholic Church. Intense subdivision of land and introduction of public transportation saw the area develop, and was named Wembley Park in 1924, shortened to Wembley in 1935.

== Geography ==
Wembley is located 5 kilometres (3.1 mi) northwest of the Perth CBD. Prominent roads that intersect with Wembley include Grantham Street, Cambridge Street, Salvado Road, Selby Street and Mitchell Freeway. Galup lies at the north-east corner of Wembley, and Herdsman Lake borders Wembley at its north-western corner. It is bounded by Churchlands, Herdsman and Glendalough to its north, all sharing their borders with Herdsman Lake. To the east, Wembley is bounded by Mount Hawthorn, Leederville and West Leederville at Galup. On its southern side, Wembley is bounded by Subiaco and Jolimont, with Floreat to its west.

=== Spearwood Dunes ===
Wembley is located on the Spearwood Dunes, west of the Bassendean Dunes on the Swan Coastal Plain. The Spearwood Dunes stretch across the Swan Coastal Plain varying by 3 to 15 kilometres (1.9 to 9.3 mi) in width and consists of Tamala Limestone under its surface.

=== Galup ===
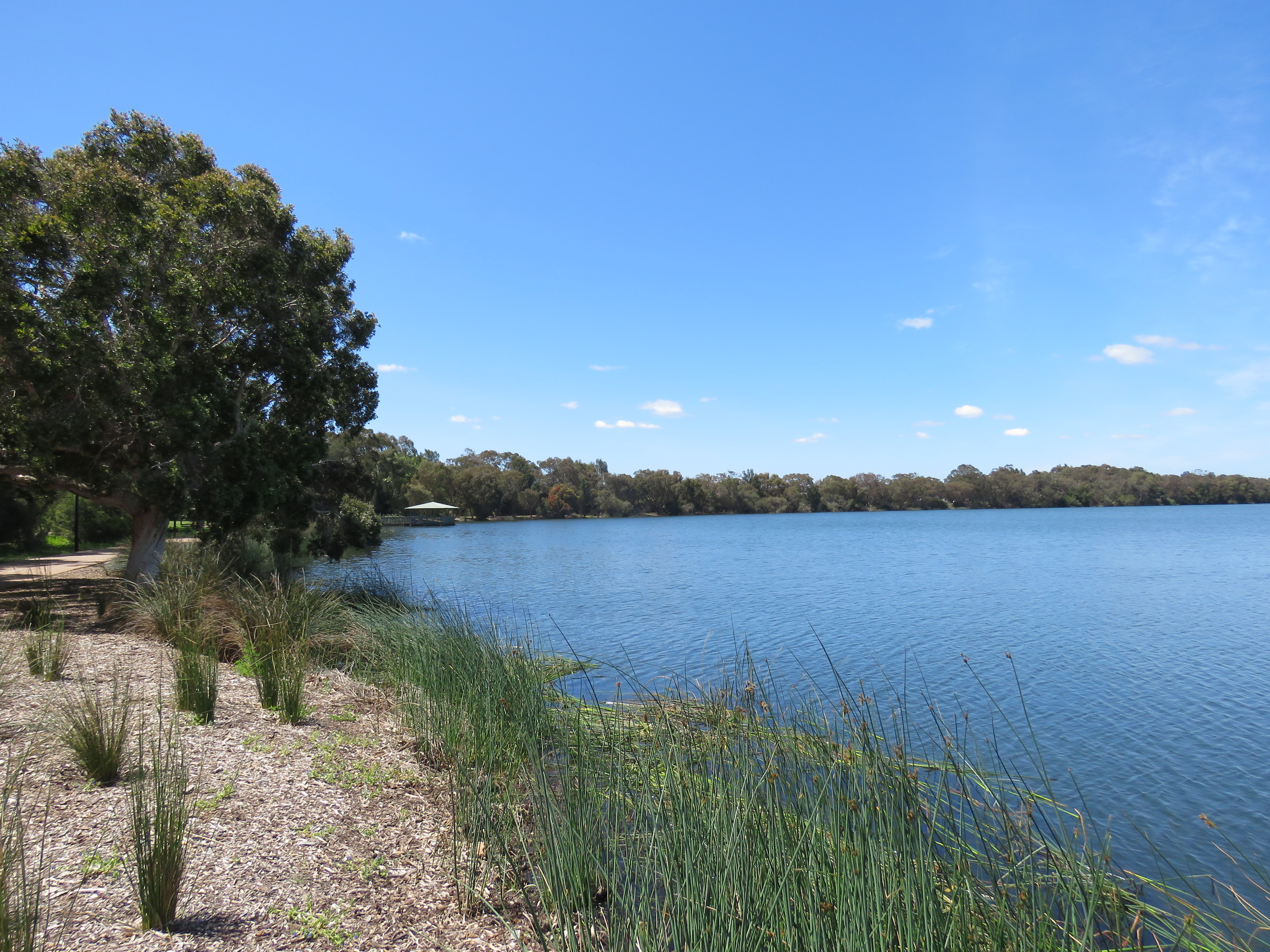
Shore of Galup

Galup is one of the few lakes remaining in Perth, named Lake Monger until 2025 after John Henry Monger who was granted land in the southern side of the lake in the early years of European settlement, before resuming its original name. The abundant wetlands in Perth had long been important to the local Aboriginal people, not only for resources but also because these sites were often camping sites associated with mythological significance. For the local Aboriginal people, Galup was used as a campsite until the 1920s. European settlers saw wetlands like Galup as both valuable resources and obstructions. With the growth of Perth, some discussion occurred regarding the outcome of Galup, including the potential for drainage or agricultural use. Eventually, it was decided that Galup would be made into a recreational reserve by reclaiming some of lake with the help of tipping waste, and by the mid-20th century, 31,291 tonnes (69 million pounds) of waste had been tipped into the lake.

== History ==
=== Aboriginal history ===
The Indigenous people of the land are the Mooro, a subgroup of the Whadjuk, of the Noongar Aboriginal clan inhabiting the upper west region of the Swan River for at least 40,000 years. The Mooro used resources throughout the region north of the Swan River and moved as the seasons changed. They moved towards the lakes during summer, as the wetlands served as an important source of water, food, vegetation, and shelter material. The Mooro moved inland to higher altitudes during winter to avoid the coastal weather. Galup and Herdsman Lake are called Galup and Ngurgenboro by the Mooro.

=== European settlement ===
The Swan River Colony, which developed into Perth, was founded in 1829. Early development of the colony was slow, partly due to unfamiliar conditions for the settlers. With the arrival of European settlers, the Mooro, led by the Indigenous leader Yellagonga at the time, retreated to Galup. Although, the Mooro were initially friendly to European settlement, differences in culture led to several conflicts throughout the 1830s. One such conflict in the Wembley area occurred in 1830, when the Mooro and European soldiers and settlers engaged in a fight, ending in what is now thought to be Galup.

In 1832, David Patterson and Henry Burgess were each granted one lot of land in the area around Lake Herdsman and Galup, then generally called the Large Lakes District or officially as the Perthshire District. David Patterson owned 40 hectares (100 acres) of land by Herdsman Lake now bound by Herdsman Parade, Dodd Street, Daglish Street, Grantham Street and Pangbourne Street. Henry Burgess owned 81 hectares (200 acres) of land which he called Burgess Farm now bound by Pangbourne Street, Grantham Street, Gregory Street and Cambridge Street. Galup was used as a food depot in 1833 for the local Aboriginal people as more land in the area was being granted to early settlers.

In January 1846, John Brady, the first Bishop of Perth, seven Sisters of Mercy and two Spanish Benedictine Monks, Joseph Benedict Serra and Rosendo Salvado arrived at Fremantle. The Catholic Church acquired land plots between Herdsman Lake and Mongers Lake in 1846–47, including the land owned by David Patterson and Henry Burgess. These plots of land came to be known as New Subiaco and were selected to be developed by the Benedictine Monks under the leadership of Serra, who became Bishop of Perth in 1849. With the help of European recruits in 1849 and 1853, they constructed temporary shelters, olive trees, a vineyard, and an orchard. In the late 1850s, a monastery was established at New Subiaco, where current day MercyCare Residential Aged Care is located, by the Benedictine Monks. The Benedictine Monks left the site in 1864 for New Norcia and development of New Subiaco stopped. These buildings were occupied again when it became St Vincent's boys orphanage in 1872, then in 1901 the Sisters of Mercy took over the buildings and it became the St Joseph's Orphanage. The area where the monastery was located came to be known as Emerald Hill, a reference to Ireland, in the 1890s due to its strong Irish Catholic presence.

=== Early development ===
With the completion of the Perth–Fremantle railway in 1881, Subiaco station opened in 1883 nearby, close to Salvado Road. Subiaco station was used by residents in the Wembley area due to its proximity. The population and demand for housing in the Wembley area, as with other areas in the colony, saw large growth with the Western Australia gold rush as the population spread further out from the city, shortly after the discovery of gold in Coolgardie and Kalgoorlie in 1892 and 1893. The gold rush saw the colony's population double by 1895 to 100,515, and nearly double by 1901 to 184,124. Though, throughout the early 1900s, absence of public transportation slowed the development of the Wembley area as car ownership had not been widespread yet.

Galup was used for recreational purposes during this time and the Monger's Lake Board, established in 1902, oversaw the development of the lake. Playgrounds, jetties, a bandstand and bathing sheds were built on Galup, with boating, yacht races and fishing being a form of leisure for residents.

In 1909, the Municipality of Leederville, the Roman Catholic Church and John Nanson, then the owner of the Perthshire Estate, began talks on subdivision of their lands around the Wembley area. The land owned by the Catholic Church was subdivided first to create the Church Lands Estate and the Perthshire Estate, on the western side of the area, then underwent subdivision. The Churchlands Estate was officially a part of West Leederville by the early 1920s and it was deemed appropriate to identify the area separate from West Leederville, as it had caused practical issues for residents. The Church Lands, Emerald Hill and Perthshire Estates had their names changed and gazetted as Wembley Park in 1924, named after the suburb in London. This name was later shortened to Wembley in 1935. During the expansion of the Perth tramways between 1913 and 1930, tramway construction delays in Wembley led to a motor bus service being subsidised in 1923. A tram station was built in Wembley in 1927, reaching up to Nanson Street, and allowed greater access to western Perth. Wembley was relatively remote till this time with no road along Galup till 1930 and no road to the beach yet.

Greater emphasis was placed on leisure and entertainment in Wembley as the area developed and Cambridge Street has especially been the centre for such business. The Wembley Picture Theatre and the Wembley Picture Gardens opened in 1937 on Cambridge Street and they could seat over 800 patrons and up to 800 patrons respectively. The western end of Cambridge Street also featured a dairy till 1941, and several businesses opened around the Wembley Hotel which was established earlier in 1932. The tram line through Wembley was closed and replaced by trolleybus in 1939, as trolleybuses were seen to be a cheaper way to meet the increasing demand for public transportation.

=== Post-war development ===
An increase in private car ownership saw more service stations pop up and was a factor for growth in Wembley. The provision of supplementary services, like Infant Health Clinics, were an indicator for growth in Wembley. Nearby, the 1962 British Empire and Commonwealth Games were held in the suburb of Floreat with the construction of the Perry Lakes Stadium.

In this period, Wembley was seen as part of the inner suburbs and saw an increase in housing densities as more younger families started to move in. This was accompanied by unit development replacing some older housing. In 1994, the Town of Cambridge was created from the City of Perth, which Wembley became a part of. Cambridge Street has also experienced further commercial development more recently.

== Commercial areas ==
The main commercial area is on Cambridge Street, where the Cambridge Forum International Food Court and several businesses are located. The Wembley Hotel is also on Cambridge Street, designed by Edgar Le B Henderson and constructed in 1932. The Wembley Hotel and several commercial properties on Cambridge Street are currently listed on the municipal heritage inventory, indicating future potential for state heritage significance. Businesses are also located on Selby Street, Herdsman Parade and Grantham Street.

== Transport ==
=== Public transport ===
Wembley is served by public transport through several bus routes. Buses that are available in Wembley are the following routes:

- 15 Perth Busport to Glendalough Station – serves Powis Street
- 81 and 82 Perth Busport to City Beach – serve Cambridge Street
- 83 Perth Busport to City Beach – serves Cambridge Street, Harborne Street and Grantham Street
- 84 Perth Busport to City Beach – serves Cambridge Street, Harborne Street, Grantham Street and Selby Street
- 85 Perth Busport to Glendalough Station – serves Cambridge Street, Selby Street, Flynn Street, Herdsman Parade and Jon Sanders Drive
- 95 Subiaco Station to Glendalough Station – serves Harborne Street
- 998 Fremantle Station to Fremantle Station (limited stops) – CircleRoute clockwise, serves Selby Street
- 999 Fremantle Station to Fremantle Station (limited stops) – CircleRoute anti-clockwise, serves Selby Street

Train stations closest to Wembley are in Subiaco and Glendalough.

=== Roads ===
Given that public transportation in Wembley consists of bus routes, 7.3% of Wembley residents travelled to work by bus, 4.3% higher than the national average. 64.5% of residents travelled to work by car, either as a driver or passenger, and 12.9% of residents travelled to work by public transport.

== Schools ==
- Wembley Primary School
- Lake Monger Primary School
- Bold Park Community School

== Places of worship ==
- Westcity Church
- Wembley Uniting Church
- St Edmund's Anglican Church
- Churches of Christ
- Oceans Church
- Cambridge Baptist Church
- Our Lady of Victories Church
- Providence City

== Population ==
Wembley has a population of 12,061, which is relatively large compared to other suburbs in Perth. According to the 2021 Australian Bureau of Statistics census data:

Age distribution

Wembley has a median age of 37, one year younger than the state and national median. Wembley also has a relatively high proportion of residents between the ages of 30 and 44.

Country of birth

59.5% of Wembley residents are born in Australia, slightly less than the national average of 62.0%. The next highest countries of birth were Bhutan (6.5%), England (5.9%), India (2.3%), New Zealand (1.7%) and China (1.7%).

Language

5.4% of Wembley residents spoke “Other Southern Asian Languages” (which includes Balti, Burushaski, Nuristani, and more). Other languages other than English spoken at home were Mandarin (2.9%), Italian (1.1%), Spanish (1.1%) and Cantonese (0.9%). 72.7% spoke only English at home.

Religion

33.9% of Wembley residents claimed no religious affiliation. 22.9% were Catholic, 11.8% were Anglican, 5.1% were Buddhist, and 4.3% chose not to state any religion.

== Politics ==
=== Local ===
Wembley lies mostly within the boundaries of the Town of Cambridge local government area, and partially within the City of Stirling local government area to the north. The mayor of the Town of Cambridge is Keri Shannon, with a term expiring in 2023. The mayor of the City of Stirling is Mark Irwin, with a term expiring in 2023.

=== State ===
Wembley falls mostly under the Churchlands state electoral boundaries, and partially under Nedlands to the south.

=== Federal ===
Wembley falls under the division of Curtin for the Australian House of Representatives. The member for the division of Curtin is Kate Chaney, an independent.
