= City of Stirling =

Coordinates: 31°52′59″S 115°48′36″E

- Local government area
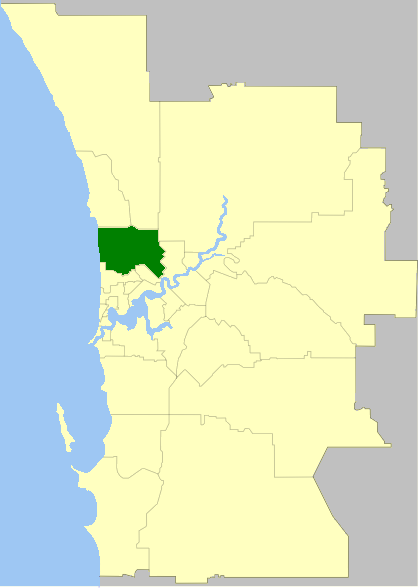
- The City of Stirling within the Perth Metropolitan Area

- Interactive map of City of Stirling
- Country: Australia
- State: Western Australia
- Region: North Metropolitan Perth
- Established: 1871
- Council seat: Stirling

Government
  - Mayor: Mark Irwin
  - State electorates: Balcatta, Carine, Mount Lawley, Nollamara, Scarborough; Sections of Churchlands*, Girrawheen, Morley
  - Federal division: Curtin, Perth

Area
  - Total: 105.2 km^{2} (40.6 sq mi)

Population
  - Total: 226,369 (LGA 2021) (16th)
- Website: City of Stirling
LGAs around City of Stirling
	Joondalup and Wanneroo	Swan
Indian Ocean	City of Stirling	Bayswater
	Cambridge	Vincent

The City of Stirling is a local government area in the northern suburbs of the Western Australian capital city of Perth about 10 kilometres (6 mi) north of Perth's central business district. The city has an area of 105.2 square kilometres (40.6 sq mi), and its population of over 223,000 makes it the largest local government area by population in Western Australia.

== History ==
Stirling was established on 24 January 1871 as the Perth Road District under the District Roads Act 1871. The district at that time included what are now the Cities of Wanneroo, Joondalup, Bayswater and Belmont.

With the passage of the Local Government Act 1960, which reformed all road districts into shires, it became the Shire of Perth on 1 July 1961. The Shire of Perth had a population of 84,000 in 1961. It was declared a city and renamed Stirling on 24 January 1971.

At a meeting of electors in May 2021, electors passed a motion that the City of Stirling be renamed, causing it to be considered at the next council meeting. The rationale for the proposal was the personal involvement of James Stirling, the first governor of Western Australia and the namesake of the city, in the Pinjarra Massacre on 28 October 1834. Following the well-conceived ambush and subsequent massacre of 15 to 80 Binjareb Noongar men, women, and children lasting at least one hour that Stirling led personally, Stirling threatened the Noongar people with genocide should they continue to resist colonisation. Historian Chris Owen has argued that James Stirling's involvement in the Pinjarra massacre was on the historical record, and "there's no ambiguity in it any more, Stirling set out to punish the Noongar tribe down there for blocking expansion of the colony. He told everyone what he was going to do, went down there, did it and reported on it."

The motion made national news, and sparked a barrage of hateful messages towards the City of Stirling. Among suggestions was for a dual name to be adopted, involving a Noongar name. A report released by the city two weeks later stated that the name change was not a priority, and that there were significant costs associated with any name change. At the council meeting on 8 June 2021, arguments were put forth either way, with one councillor saying "while nobody condoned historical atrocities, a name change would cost 'millions of dollars', would set a dangerous precedent and should be 'nipped in the bud'", but no motions regarding changing the name were carried. The meeting was attended by over 100 people, an unusually high number. Shortly afterwards, Western Australian senators called for a broader review of Western Australian "place names, such as Stirling Range, linked to colonial figures with known racist histories ... such as William Dampier, John Forrest and John Septimus Roe."

== Wards ==
The city has been divided into seven wards, each of two councillors. Each councillor serves a four-year term, and half-elections are held every two years. The mayor is elected from among the councillors.

- Balga Ward
- Coastal Ward
- Doubleview Ward
- Hamersley Ward
- Inglewood Ward
- Lawley Ward
- Osborne Ward

== Suburbs ==
The suburbs of the City of Stirling with population and size figures based on the most recent Australian census:

Suburb	Population	Area	Map
Balcatta	10,813 (SAL 2021)	7.1 km^{2} (2.7 sq mi)	
Balga	13,864 (SAL 2021)	5.2 km^{2} (2.0 sq mi)	
Carine	7,330 (SAL 2021)	4.7 km^{2} (1.8 sq mi)	
Churchlands	3,638 (SAL 2021)	1.7 km^{2} (0.66 sq mi)	
Coolbinia	1,751 (SAL 2021)	0.9 km^{2} (0.35 sq mi)	
Dianella	24,169 (SAL 2021)	10.8 km^{2} (4.2 sq mi)	
Doubleview	9,205 (SAL 2021)	2.7 km^{2} (1.0 sq mi)	
Glendalough	2,628 (SAL 2021)	0.7 km^{2} (0.27 sq mi)	
Gwelup	5,391 (SAL 2021)	2.9 km^{2} (1.1 sq mi)	
Hamersley	5,209 (SAL 2021)	3.4 km^{2} (1.3 sq mi)	
Herdsman	0 (SAL 2016)	3.1 km^{2} (1.2 sq mi)	
Inglewood	5,837 (SAL 2021)	2.9 km^{2} (1.1 sq mi)	
Innaloo	9,592 (SAL 2021)	3.1 km^{2} (1.2 sq mi)	
Joondanna	5,283 (SAL 2021)	1.5 km^{2} (0.58 sq mi)	
Karrinyup	9,886 (SAL 2021)	6.6 km^{2} (2.5 sq mi)	
Menora	2,691 (SAL 2021)	1.1 km^{2} (0.42 sq mi)	
Mirrabooka	8,000 (SAL 2021)	5.1 km^{2} (2.0 sq mi)	
Mount Lawley	11,328 (SAL 2021)	4.4 km^{2} (1.7 sq mi)	
Nollamara	12,779 (SAL 2021)	3.7 km^{2} (1.4 sq mi)	
North Beach	3,689 (SAL 2021)	2.1 km^{2} (0.81 sq mi)	
Osborne Park	4,463 (SAL 2021)	5.1 km^{2} (2.0 sq mi)	
Scarborough	17,605 (SAL 2021)	4.9 km^{2} (1.9 sq mi)	
Stirling	10,165 (SAL 2021)	4.9 km^{2} (1.9 sq mi)	
Trigg	2,855 (SAL 2021)	2.4 km^{2} (0.93 sq mi)	
Tuart Hill	7,541 (SAL 2021)	2.1 km^{2} (0.81 sq mi)	
Watermans Bay	1,369 (SAL 2021)	1.2 km^{2} (0.46 sq mi)	
Wembley	12,061 (SAL 2021)	4.2 km^{2} (1.6 sq mi)	
Wembley Downs	6,743 (SAL 2021)	4.3 km^{2} (1.7 sq mi)	
Westminster	7,042 (SAL 2021)	2.3 km^{2} (0.89 sq mi)	
Woodlands	4,551 (SAL 2021)	1.9 km^{2} (0.73 sq mi)	
Yokine	12,706 (SAL 2021)	4.8 km^{2} (1.9 sq mi)	

== Population ==
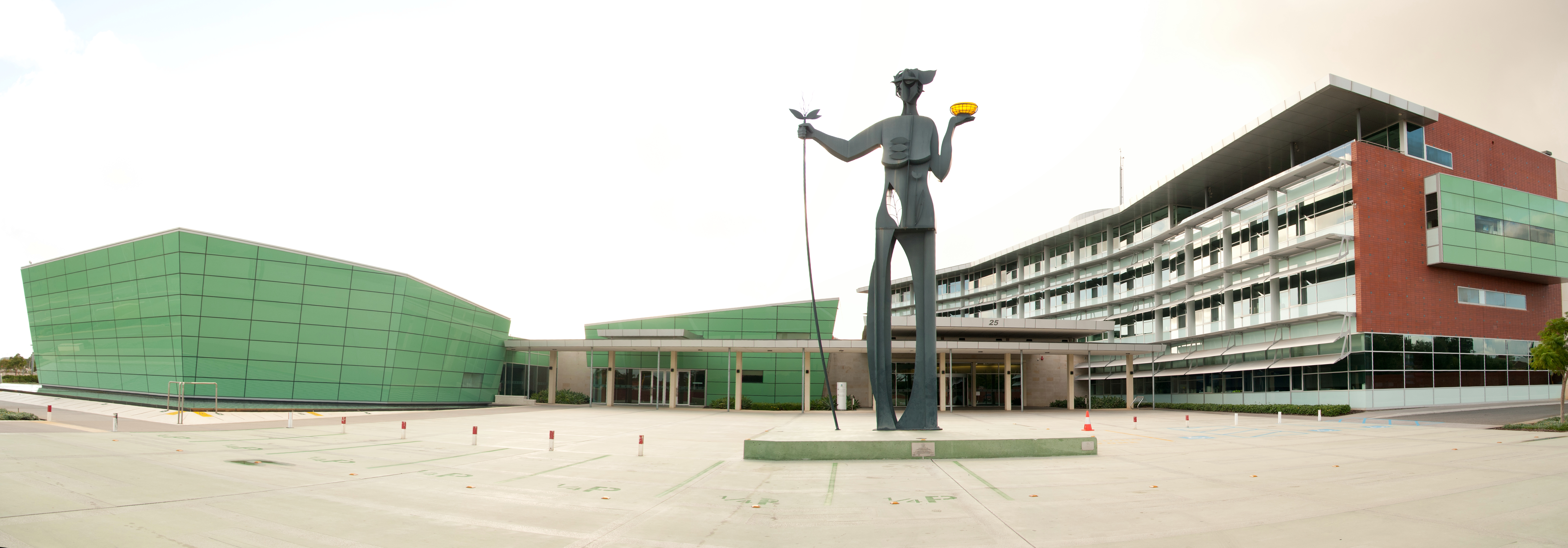
City of Stirling offices.

Historical population

Year	Pop.	±% p.a.
1911	5,066	—
1921	12,043	+9.05%
1933	19,987	+4.31%
1947	30,989	+3.18%
1954	50,090	+7.10%
1961	84,045	+7.67%
1966	114,410	+6.36%
1971	154,882	+6.24%
1976	162,313	+0.94%

Year	Pop.	±% p.a.
1981	161,858	−0.06%
1986	164,687	+0.35%
1991	172,064	+0.88%
1996	172,819	+0.09%
2001	167,578	−0.61%
2006	176,872	+1.09%
2011	195,702	+2.04%
2016	210,208	+1.44%
2021	226,369	+1.49%

- The 1996 figure includes 9,703 residents living in Maylands, and Mount Lawley south of the Midland railway line who were transferred to the City of Bayswater in 1998.

== Libraries ==
The City of Stirling holds 6 libraries. They are the:

- Scarborough Library
- Karrinyup Library
- Dianella Library
- Inglewood Library
- Mirrabooka Library
- Osborne Library

== Heritage-listed places ==
As of 2024, 641 places are heritage-listed in the City of Stirling, of which 20 are on the State Register of Heritage Places.

== See also ==
- List of mayors of Stirling
