= Herdsman Lake =

Lake in Perth, Western Australia

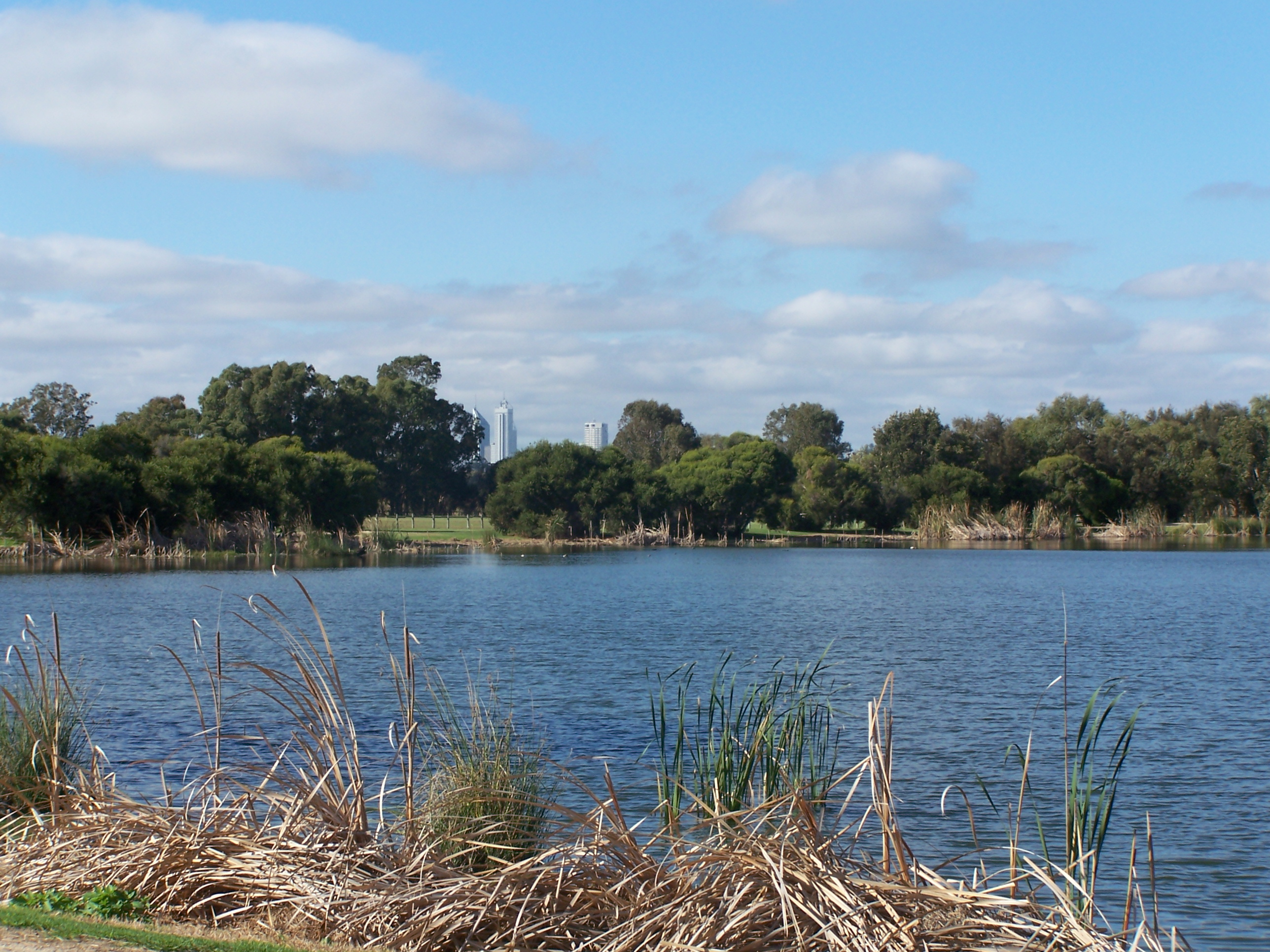
- Looking across a dredged section of the lake towards Perth

- Location within Perth
- Interactive map of Herdsman Lake
- Location: Perth, Western Australia
- Coordinates: 31°55′12″S 115°48′25″E
- Basin countries: Australia
- Designation: Herdsman Lake Regional Park
- Max. length: 2.5 km (1.6 mi)
- Max. width: 2 km (1.2 mi)
- Surface area: 3 km^{2} (1.2 sq mi)
- Settlements: Perth

Herdsman Lake (Nyungar: Njookenbooro, Ngurgenboro and various other spellings) is a freshwater lake located on the Swan Coastal Plain in the Perth suburb of Herdsman in Western Australia. It is situated 6 kilometres (3.7 mi) north-west of the Perth central business district. The main shared-use path around the lake is approximately 8 kilometres (5.0 mi) in length, whilst the wetland perimeter of the lake is approximately 7.5 kilometres (4.7 mi).

== Description ==
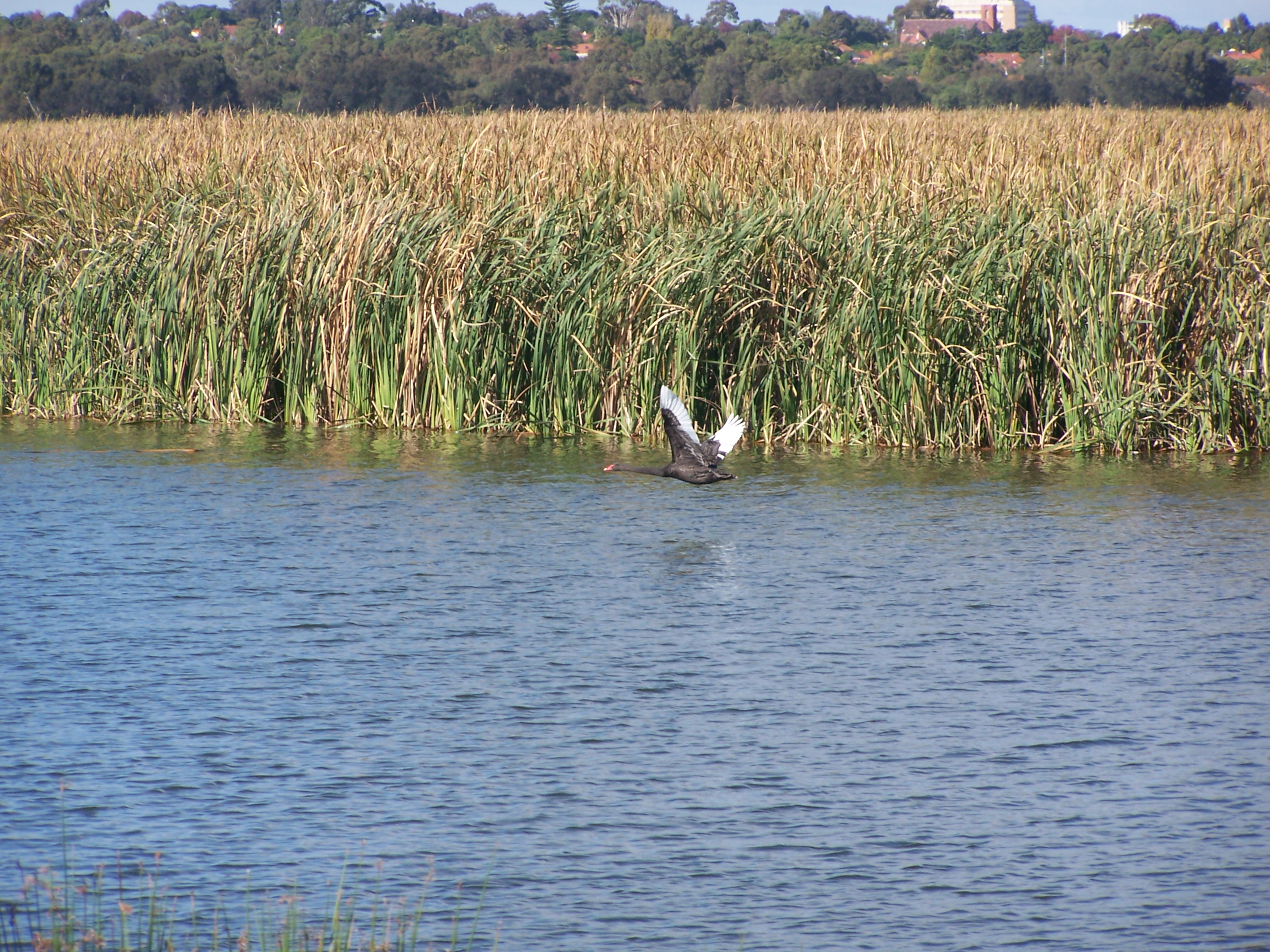
Black swan in flight at Herdsman Lake

The lake is encompassed by Herdsman Lake Regional Park, measuring 2.5 kilometres (1.6 mi) in length and 2 kilometres (1.2 mi) in width and covering an area of 300 hectares (740 acres). The perimeter of the lake is dredged to provide permanent open water during the dry summer months, comprising about 15% of the area. The lake is a wildlife sanctuary, with birdwatching a popular activity.

Almost 80% of the lake is covered with Typha rush (Typha orientalis), an introduced weed. In summer, most of the lake is dry, except the 15% of the lake dredged to create permanent deep water.

The Herdsman Main Drain is a 4-kilometre-long (2.5 mi) underground pipe drain with a diameter of 1 metre (3 ft 3 in) carrying excess water from the lake to its outflow at City Beach.

== History ==
=== Pre-colonial use ===
Prior to colonisation, the Noongar people used the lake as a food source and meeting point. They primarily camped on the higher ground around the lake's northern and western edges, to avoid flooding and minimise exposure to midges and mosquitoes. The roots and stems of bullrushes supplied carbohydrates and the lake was also "an important source of protein in the form of frogs, tortoises, crustaceans and water fowl".

=== Colonial period ===
Following the creation of the Swan River Colony in 1829, British settlers originally named it the Great Lake, being the largest of the series of lakes and wetlands to the north of the Perth townsite. By the mid-1830s it had become known as Herdsman's Lake. In 1837, Surveyor-General John Septimus Roe investigated the possibility of draining Galup into Herdsman Lake, setting aside a reserve for a drain which was later cancelled. Unlike the lakes closer to the townsite, Herdsman Lake and Galup were "left relatively undisturbed" in the early years of the colony as they were considered too far away to develop into residential land. However, the fertile land around them was subdivided and used for agricultural purposes. The lake itself was a "favourite resort for duck shooters".

In 1854, Benedictine monks were granted a large portion of land near the lake and established orchards and vineyards. The Catholic Church came to own most of the land and used it to graze cattle, while a number of market gardens were also established. The Western Australian gold rushes brought a population influx and saw the lake used for raising pigs and poultry as well as growing crops.

=== Drainage scheme ===
In 1912, most of the swamps in Osborne Park were drained into Herdsman Lake to improve growing conditions for the market gardens in that suburb. The Public Works Department subsequently began a scheme to drain the entirety of Herdsman Lake and reclaim the land for market gardens. The land formed part of a soldier settlement scheme for World War I veterans with around 518 hectares (1,280 acres) acquired by the state government from the Catholic Church. Construction on the drainage scheme began in 1921 and was completed in 1925, with the drain including a tunnel of 3.2 kilometres (2.0 mi) leading to an ocean outlet in Floreat.

The drainage scheme "was never successful; blocks sold slowly, there was continual flooding in winter, and soils were largely unsuitable for horticulture". The scheme, which cost £A 116,362 (equivalent to A$10.7 million in 2022), lowered the water level in Herdsman Lake from a peak seasonal depth of 3 metres (9.8 ft) to a depth of only 0.5 metres (1 ft 8 in). The soils proved too peaty and acidic for crops to be grown successfully, and the decrease in water level contributed to a replacement of native bulrushes with introduced species. The lake was instead used for cattle grazing into the 1970s, while at various points Herdsman Lake was also considered for metropolitan water supply purposes, as the site of an airport, for peat harvesting, and as a rubbish dump.

=== Preservation ===
In 1955, the Plan for the Metropolitan Region, Perth and Fremantle recommended that Herdsman Lake be set aside for "parks and recreation" purposes, which was endorsed by the Metropolitan Region Scheme formally approved by the state government in 1963. In 1976, the Metropolitan Regional Planning Authority produced the Plan for Herdsman Lake, which was subsequently adopted with amendments by the state government as the Herdsman Lake Concept Plan. The concept plan called for the central area of the lake to be preserved by creating a moat of deep channels around the periphery, resulting in the creation of four bodies of deep water:

1. Floreat Waters (always intended to be a single body of water)
2. Floreat Lakes (a single body of water originally intended to be two)
3. Popeye Lake (also known as Industrial Lake)
4. Powis Lake

The plan also allowed for the development of residential areas on the north-west and south-west fringes of the lake, and expanded the industrial area to the north-east.

The Herdsman Lake Wildlife Centre was opened in 1984, following a fundraising effort by the Gould League of Western Australia, the Royal Australasian Ornithologists Union, and the World Wildlife Fund. Herdsman Lake was made a regional park in 1997, to be co-managed by the Department of Conservation and Land Management and the City of Stirling.

== Attractions ==
Attractions within the park include the Olive Seymour Boardwalk, Herdsman Lake Discovery Centre and Settler's Cottage. It also contains a statue created by Pietro Porcelli, which formerly sat atop the AMP Chambers building until it was demolished, which was rescued and placed on one of the islands. Walking, cycling, picnicking, birdwatching and wildflower spotting are popular activities in the park. Disabled access is provided.

== Wildlife ==
=== Mammals ===
Herdsman Lake supported a population of kangaroos until the early 1950s. Quendas, brushtail possums and western brush wallabies were present until the 1960s.

=== Reptiles ===
Herdsman Lake is known for inhabiting a plenitude of tiger snakes.

=== Birds ===
More than 160 species of bird have been recorded at Herdsman Lake, including some notable sightings and endemic species to the region. Notable sightings include:

- Purple heron in February 2013, a vagrant to Australia
- Striated heron in July 2013, vagrant this far south in Western Australia
- Collared pratincole in January 2019, first found at Point Walter and later relocated at Herdsman Lake, a first record for Australia
- Wandering whistling duck in May 2019 and July to October 2025, vagrant this far south in Western Australia
- Eastern yellow wagtail in January 2020, vagrant this far south in Western Australia

== See also ==
- List of lakes of Australia § Western Australia

== Sources ==
- Bekle, Hugo; Gentilli, Joseph (1993). "History of the Perth lakes". Early Days. 10 (5). Nedlands: Royal Western Australian Historical Society: 443–460. ISSN 0312-6145. OCLC 61311161.
- Blyth, John; Halse, Stuart A. (1986). Stewart, Sweton; Christensen, Liana (eds.). "Herdsman Lake: inner city sanctuary" (PDF). Landscope. 2 (2, Summer Edition). Como: Department of Conservation and Land Management: 28–34. ISSN 0815-4465.
- Cahill, Marion; Besch, Debbie; de Haan, Ben; Picton-King, Melinda; Roach, Nicole; Slodecki, Carlie; Mac Shane, Michael; Pattison, Mick; Rajah, Daniel; Lambe, Tanja (2007). Herdsman Lake Integrated Catchment Management Plan (PDF) (Report). North Metro Conservation Group, City of Stirling. Archived from the original (PDF) on 13 March 2011.
- Curtin University (28 September 2021). "Sick snakes a cause of concern for Perth's wetlands".
- "Herdsman Lake". Cornell University. 2025.
- "About Herdsman Lake Regional Park". WA Gould League. n.d. Archived from the original on 9 April 2006.
- Groom, Geoffrey (31 January 2019). "Checklist - 31 Jan 2019 - Herdsman Lake - 12 species". eBird.
- Graff, John (16 January 2020). "Checklist - 16 Jan 2020 - Herdsman Lake - 71 species". eBird.
- Hart, Nick (22 February 2013). "Checklist - 22 Feb 2013 - Herdsman Lake - 4 species". eBird.
- Hart, Nick (2 July 2013). "2 Jul 2013 - Herdsman Lake - 1 species". eBird.
- Harvey, Nicole (2004). Bailey, Caris; Thomson-Dans, Carolyn; Gough, David; Mooney, Rhianna (eds.). "Refuge in the city: Herdsman Lake Regional Park" (PDF). Landscope. 20 (1). Kensington: Department of Conservation and Land Management: 44–51. ISSN 0815-4465.
- Heikaus, Andreas (6 May 2019). "Checklist - 6 May 2019 - Herdsman Lake - 45 species". eBird.
- Wheeler, Karen; D’Souza, Frances (April 2007). Contaminants in Stormwater Discharge, and Associated Sediments, at Perth's Marine Beaches (PDF). Department of Water (Report). Archived from the original (PDF) on 18 February 2011.
- Wynne, Emma (23 December 2020). "Perth urban wetlands home to hundreds of tiger snakes, researcher finds". ABC News.
