= Autonomous Rapid Transit =

Type of guided articulated bus

Autonomous rapid transit (ART) 智能轨道快运系统 (智轨)
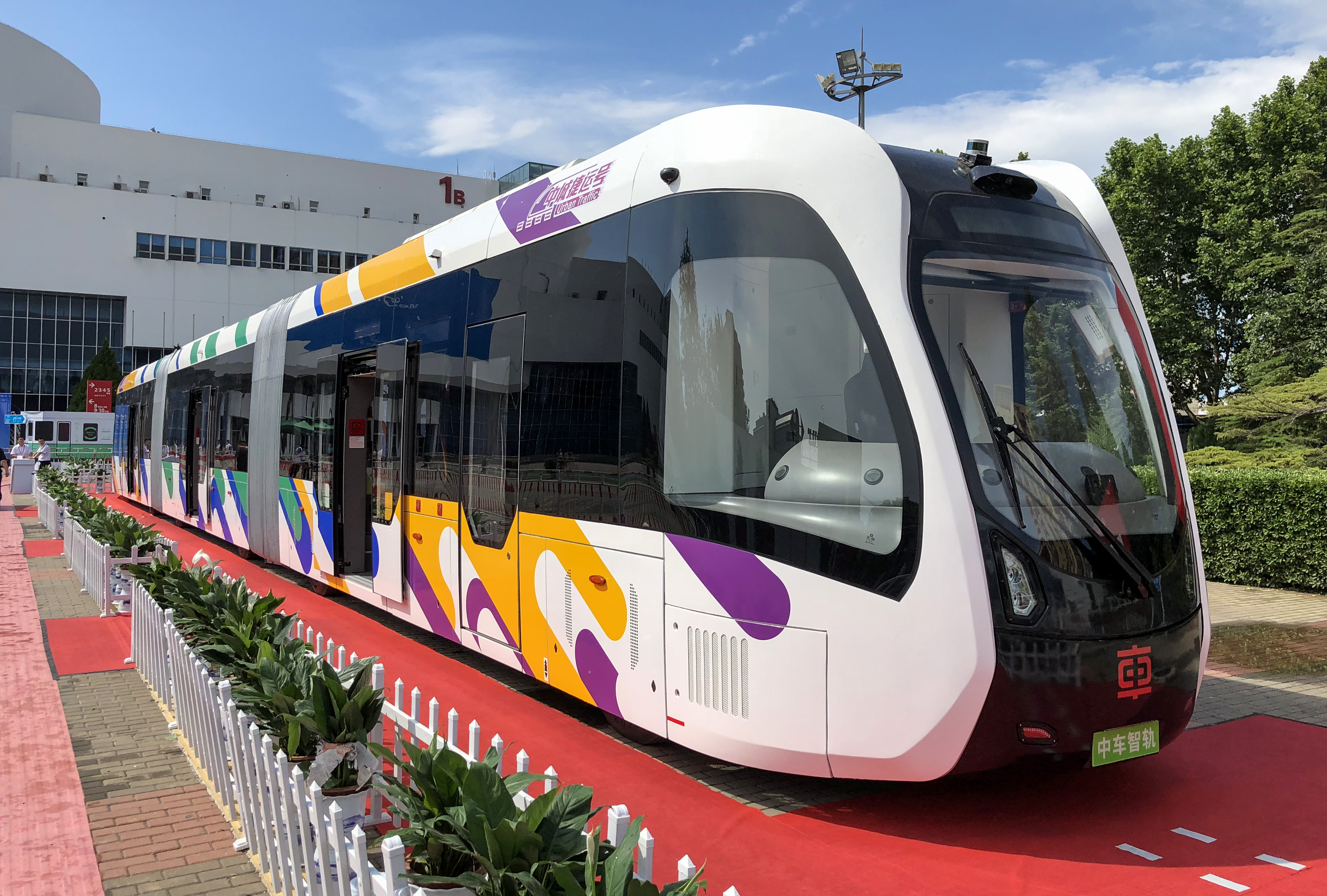
- An ART vehicle on display in 2018

Overview
- Manufacturer: CRRC
- Also called: Autonomous rail rapid transit (ARRT)
- Production: 2017–

Body and chassis
- Class: Optically-guided bus Bi-articulated bus
- Body style: Space frame with bolted-on panels
- Layout: Multi-axle steering system, Active suspension
- Floor type: Low-floor

Powertrain
- Propulsion: Rubber wheels on a plastic core
- Battery: 600 kWh Lithium–titanate batteries
- Range: 40 km (25 miles) (standard model); 80 km (50 miles) (UAE model)
- Plug-in charging: 30 sec for 3 to 5 km (1.9 to 3.1 miles): 10 min for 25 km (16 miles)

Dimensions
- Length: 3 sections: 31.64 m (103 ft 9 5/8 in)
- Width: 2.65 m (8 ft 8 3/8 in)
- Height: 3.4 m (11 ft 1 7/8 in)

Other information
- Service speed: 70 km/h (43 mph)
- Min. curve: 15 m (49.2 ft)
- Min. width of lane: 3.5 m (11.5 ft)

Chinese name
- Traditional Chinese: 智軌
- Simplified Chinese: 智轨
- Literal meaning: "Smart Rail" or "Intelligent Rail"
Transcriptions
Standard Mandarin
- Hanyu Pinyin: Zhìguǐ
- Bopomofo: ㄓˋ ㄍㄨㄟˇ

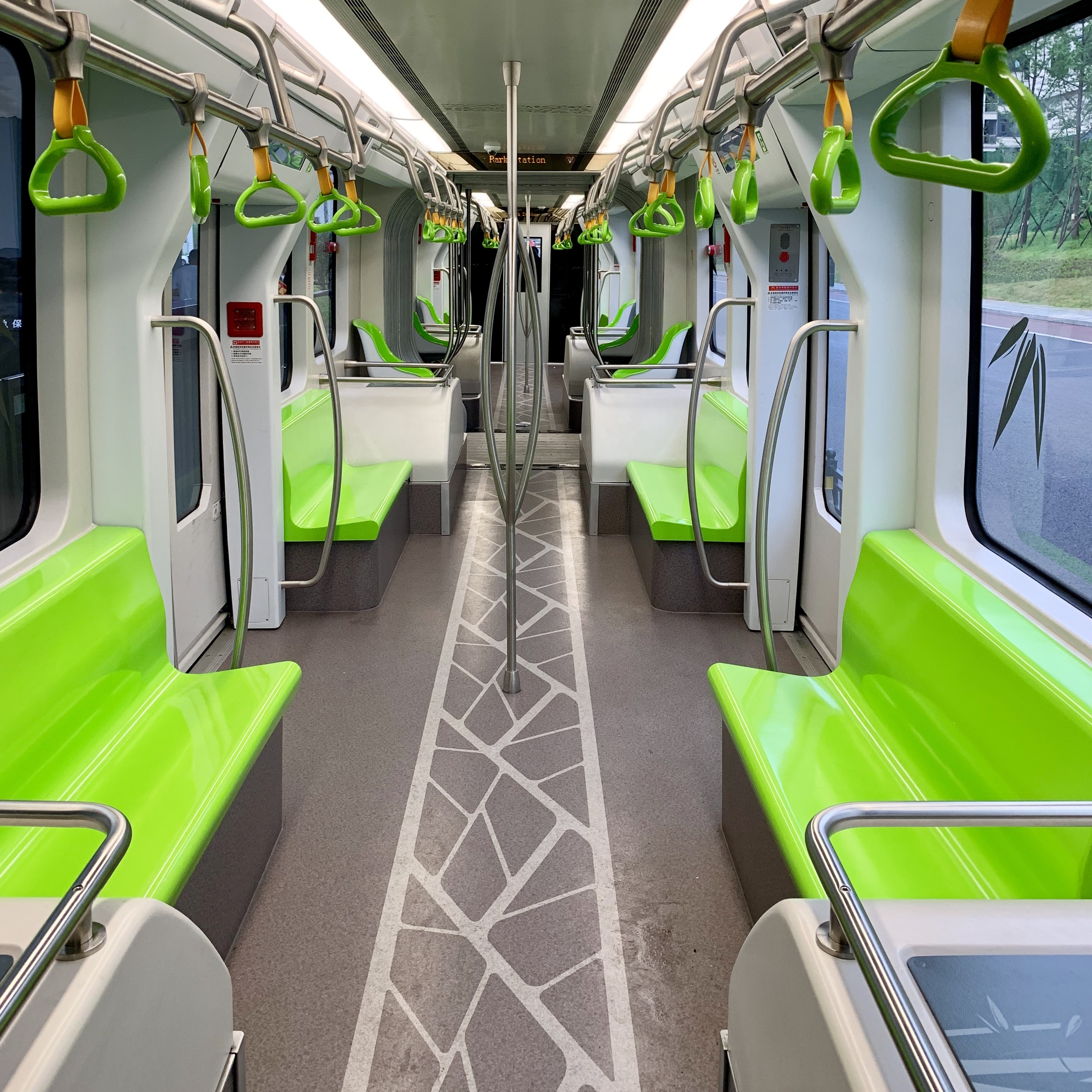
Interior of an ART vehicle in Yibin

Autonomous rapid transit (ART) (Note: Occasionally also autonomous rail rapid transit (ARRT)) is a lidar-guided (Note: Light detection and ranging) bi-articulated bus system intended for urban passenger transport. Developed by CRRC through CRRC Zhuzhou Institute Co Ltd, it was first unveiled in Zhuzhou, China, on 2 June 2017 and entered service in 2018. Though marketed with terms such as "digital rail" (Lingang digital rail rapid transit) and "electric road", its core design consists of a multi-section articulated bus, guided by optical sensors rather than rails and requiring a driver to control throttle and braking. The body is composed of fixed compartments joined by articulated gangways, giving it a superficial resemblance to a rubber-tyred tram such as a translohr or GLT. Critics have described the system, which relies entirely on public roads and lacks grade separation, as a gadgetbahn, and have pointed out that its key differences from conventional BRT are more cosmetic than substantive.

== Background ==
Before the announcement by CRRC, optical guided buses have been in use in a number of cities in Europe and North America, including in Rouen as part of Transport Est-Ouest Rouennais, in Las Vegas as a segment of Metropolitan Area Express BRT service (now discontinued), and in Castellón de la Plana as Line 1 (TRAM de Castellón). The guidance system technology used on these systems was called Visée under their original developer Matra, and is now named Optiguide after being acquired by Siemens.

== Description ==
An ART vehicle with three carriages is approximately 30 m (98 ft 5 in) long. It can travel at a speed of 70 km/h (43 mph) and can carry up to 300 passengers. A five-carriage ART vehicle provides space for 500 passengers. A four carriage model was introduced in 2021 which can carry 400 passengers. Two vehicles can closely follow each other without being mechanically connected, similarly to multiple unit train control. The entire ART has a low-floor design from a space frame with bolted-on panels to support the weight of passengers. It is built as a bi-directional vehicle, with driver's cabs at either end, allowing it to travel in either direction at full speed.

The 6.5 km (4.0 miles) long ART lane was built through downtown Zhuzhou and inaugurated in 2018.

== Sensors and batteries ==
The ART is equipped with various optical and other types of sensors to allow the vehicle to automatically follow a route defined by a virtual track of markings on the roadway. A steering wheel also allows the driver to manually guide the vehicle, including around detours. A Lane Departure Warning System helps to keep the vehicle in its lane and automatically warns, if it drifts away from the lane. A Collision Warning System supports the driver on keeping a safe distance with other vehicles on the road and if the proximity reduces below a given level, it alerts the driver by a warning sign. The Route Change Authorization is a navigation device, which analyzes the traffic conditions on the chosen route and can recommend a detour to avoid traffic congestion. The Electronic Rearview Mirrors work with remotely adjustable cameras and provide a clearer view than conventional mirrors, including an auto dimming device to reduce the glare.

The ART is powered by lithium–titanate batteries and can travel a distance of 40 km (25 miles) per full charge. The batteries can be recharged via current collectors at stations. The recharging time for a 3 to 5 km (1.9 to 3.1 mi) trip is 30 seconds and for a 25 km (16 mi) trip, 10 minutes.

== Benefits and limitations ==
A 2018 article by a sustainability academic argued trackless trams could replace both light-rail and bus rapid transit due to low cost, quick installation and low emissions. Others have disputed the claims about cost and quick installations, and argued that ART is a proprietary technology with little deployment worldwide. Other experts have argued the technology is overhyped, that optical guidance technology is not new, and that current proposals largely represent a repackaging of the bus as a rail-replacement technology. As of 2022 there are no systems outside of China and few proposals. That may be because:

- The system is not fully autonomous
- The system is not rail-based and so has the ride qualities of a bus
- The vehicles can get stuck in road traffic when not operated in dedicated rights of way
- The required vehicles cannot be bought through competitive tender

Proponents have argued the lack of rails means cheaper construction costs. Multi-axle hydraulic steering technology and bogie-like wheel arrangement could allow lower swept path in turns, thus requiring less side clearance. The minimum turning radius of 15 m (49 ft 3 in) is similar to buses.

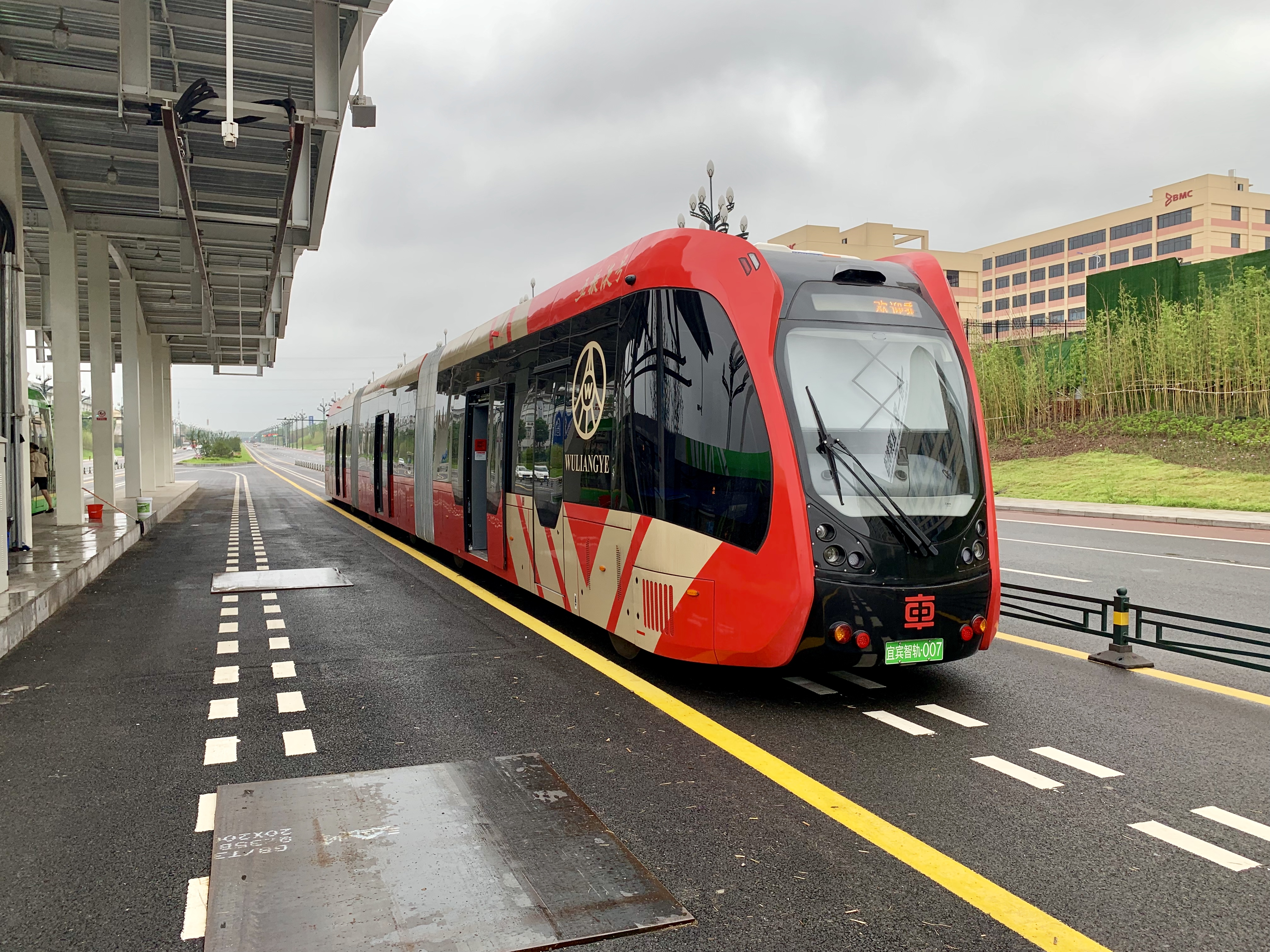
Yibin ART Line T1

However, because the ART is a guided system, ruts and depressions could be worn into the road by the alignment of the large number of wheels, so reinforcement of the roadway to prevent those problems may be as disruptive as the installation of rails in a light rail system. Researchers in 2021 found evidence of significant road wear due to trackless tram vehicles, which undermined claims of quick construction, with the researchers finding significant road strengthening was required by the technology. The suitability of the system for winter climates with ice and snow has not yet been proven. The higher rolling resistance of rubber tires requires more energy for propulsion than the steel wheels of a light rail vehicle.

A few abandoned proposals for light-rail lines have been revived as ART proposals because of the lower projected costs. However, a different report, by the Australian Railways Association, which supports light rail, said there were reliability questions with ART installations, implying the initial suggested capital cost savings were illusory. A November 2020 proposal for a trackless tram system in the City of Wyndham, near Melbourne, posited a cost of $AU23.53M per km for roadworks, vehicles, recharge point and depots. Recently completed light rail systems in Australia have had costs of between $AU80M and $AU150M per km.

The Government of New South Wales considered the system as an alternative to light rail for a line to connect Sydney Olympic Park to Parramatta. However, concerns were raised that there was only one supplier of the technology, and that the development of "long articulated buses" was "too much in its preliminary phase" to meet the project deadlines. Instead, the plan was to build a light-rail line which would connect to another light-rail route already under construction, so passengers would not have to change vehicles.

The Auckland Light Rail Group, in its studies of trackless trams for the City Centre to Māngere line, found that trackless trams would have a lower capacity than claimed. The official specifications for the ARRT assume a standing density of eight passengers per square meter, whereas many transit systems have more typical standing densities of four passengers per square meter. Based on that, the 32-metre (105 ft 0 in) long ARRT would more realistically have a capacity of 170 passengers, rather than the claimed 307. This would be only a slight increase over the typical capacity of conventional bi-articulated buses at the same passenger density (~150 passengers), and less than a typical 33 m (108 ft 3 in) long LRV (~210-225 passengers).

== ART systems ==
=== Commercially operating lines ===
List of lines in commercial operation
Line	System	Locale	Country	Length	Stations	Opened
Line A1 (Chinese: 智能轨道快运A1线)	Zhuzhou ART	Zhuzhou	China	3.6 km (2.2 mi)	4	May 18, 2018
Line A2 (Chinese: 智能轨道快运A2线)	Zhuzhou ART	Zhuzhou	China	7.1 km (4.4 mi)	8	March 30, 2021
Line T1 (Chinese: 智轨T1线)	Yibin ART	Yibin	China	17.7 km (11.0 mi)	16	December 5, 2019
Line 1 (Chinese: 临港中运量1号线)	Lingang DRT	Shanghai	China	47.95 km (29.79 mi)	26	June 30, 2021
Line 2 (Chinese: 临港中运量2号线)	Lingang DRT	Shanghai	China	47.95 km (29.79 mi)	26	November 28, 2022
Line 3 (Chinese: 临港中运量3号线)	Lingang DRT	Shanghai	China	47.95 km (29.79 mi)	26	July 5, 2023
Line 1	Campeche Light Train	Campeche	Mexico	14.6 km (9.1 mi)	14	July 20, 2025

List of lines in trial operation
Line	System	Locale	Country	Length	Stations	Opened
SRT Line 1	Yancheng SRT	Yancheng	China	13 km (8.1 mi)	17	April 16, 2021
TBA	Yongxiu ART	Yongxiu	China	5 km (3.1 mi) (total planned 16 km (9.9 mi))	4	March 20, 2019

=== Systems under construction ===
Line	System	Locale	Country	Length	Stations	Planned opening
Blue Line	Kuching ART	Kuching	Malaysia	27.6 km (17.1 mi)	14	2026
Red Line	Kuching ART	Kuching	Malaysia	12.3 km (7.6 mi)	8	2027
Green Line	Kuching ART	Kuching	Malaysia	30 km (18.6 mi)	14	2028
Line 5	Metrorrey Line 5	Monterrey	Mexico	10.6 km (6.6 mi)	15	2027

=== Proposed systems ===
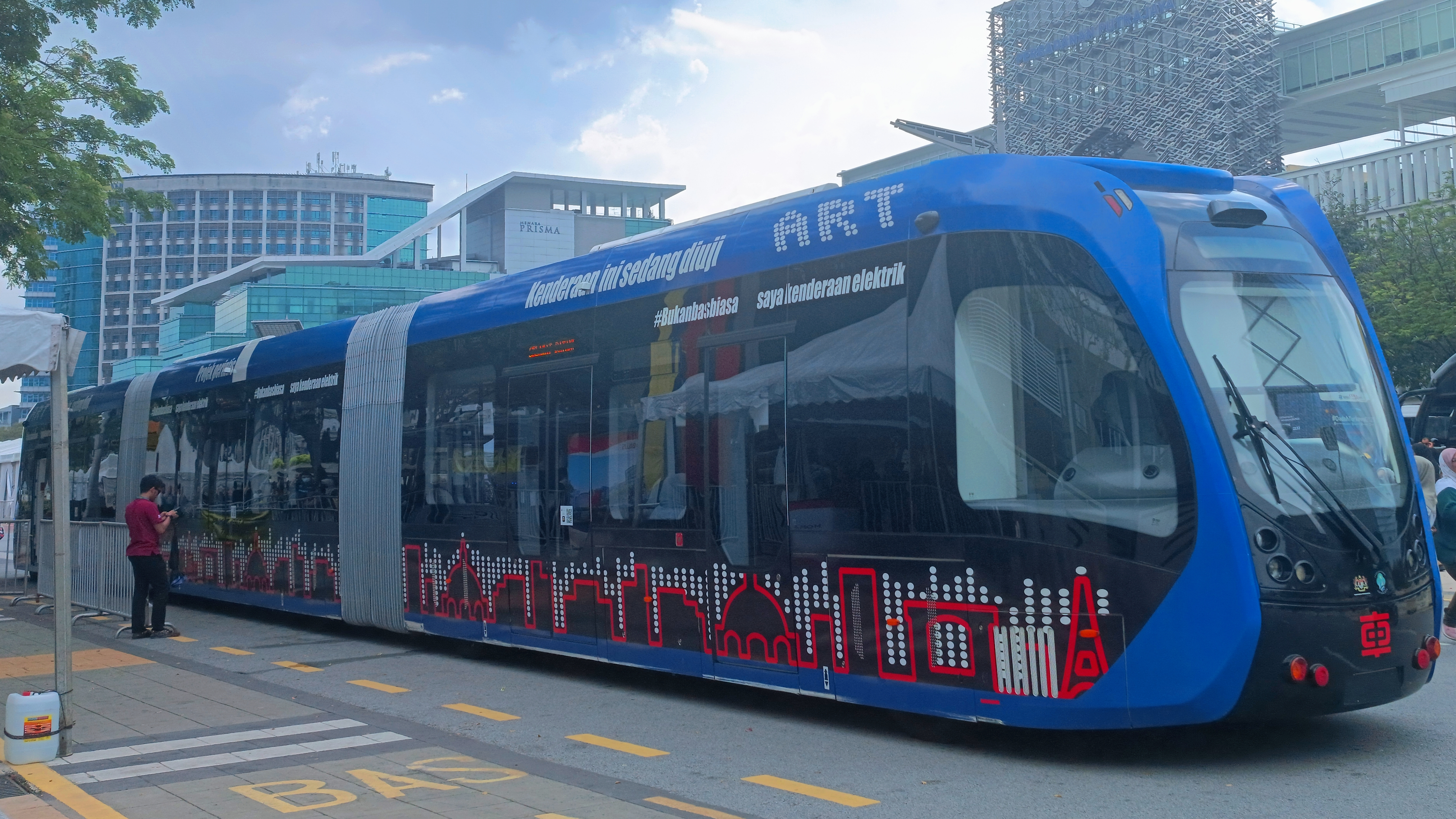
ART bus under testing in Putrajaya, Malaysia

Proposals, including vehicle testing, have been made in several countries.

- China, Changsha. Changsha Meixi Lake to Changsha Municipal Government line, reported to start construction in 2021 for completion in 2022
- China, Harbin. In May 2021 testing of a vehicle was underway with plans for an 18.2 km (11.3 mi) route with 11 stations. There are reports that stations have been constructed in January 2021 and trial operations will commence in August 2021.
- China, Tongli. As of February 2021 testing was underway with the service expected to open to passengers by the end of 2021.
- China, Xi'an. Two routes. One with 18 stations over 29.7 km (18.5 mi) and second with 9 stations over 10.6 km (6.6 mi).
- Malaysia. Iskandar Malaysia Bus Rapid Transit in Johor. ART is one technology under consideration for the corridor. In May 2024, the planned three line IMBRT was shelved due to unable to handle the traffic flow and affect the efficiency of the service. The traffic flow condition were projected to be much worse when the now under-construction RTS Link train line were expected to be completed by end 2026. The Johor government then propose the construction of Elevated Autonomous Rapid Transit (E-ART) system, a hybrid system utilising LRT infrastructure (without the LRT track) and ART system to replaced the now cancelled IMBRT.
- Australia. Perth In March 2021, the Government of Australia provided $2 million to produce a business case to investigate a trackless tram on Scarborough Beach Road between the Stirling and the Perth CBD. In September 2023, an ART vehicle was delivered to the City of Stirling to begin trials for a proposed route between Glendalough railway station and Scarborough Beach.
- New Zealand. In June 2024, Auckland Transport indicated it was interested in trialling ART on the Northern Busway.
- Brazil. ART technology is being considered by Curitiba's Rede Integrada de Transporte. In July 2025, it was announced tests with the CRRC compositions passing through their current corridors – which were one of the pioneers in the BRT system – in replacement of their current buses ones.
- Brazil, São Paulo. Bonde São Paulo. It will consist of two lines connecting key locations in São Paulo historic downtown area, including commuter train, subway and bus terminals. The first phase is scheduled to open in 2027.
- Pakistan, Lahore, Super Autonomous Rapid Transit (SART) - will soon be expanded to Faisalabad and Gujranwala, following a successful public road test in Lahore on 2025.
- Ljubljana, Slovenia. In November 2026, municipal operator Ljubljanski potniški promet (LPP) began trialling a 30-metre CRRC ART vehicle - locally termed a "battery tram" (baterijski tramvaj) - along the Barjanska–Slovenska–Dunajska–Žale corridor, operating manually during two-phase testing.
- United Kingdom: Hertfordshire Essex Rapid Transit (HERT), a proposed transit system across the county of Hertfordshire. Trackless tram vehicles are being considered, but the transit mode remains unconfirmed.

=== Cancelled projects ===
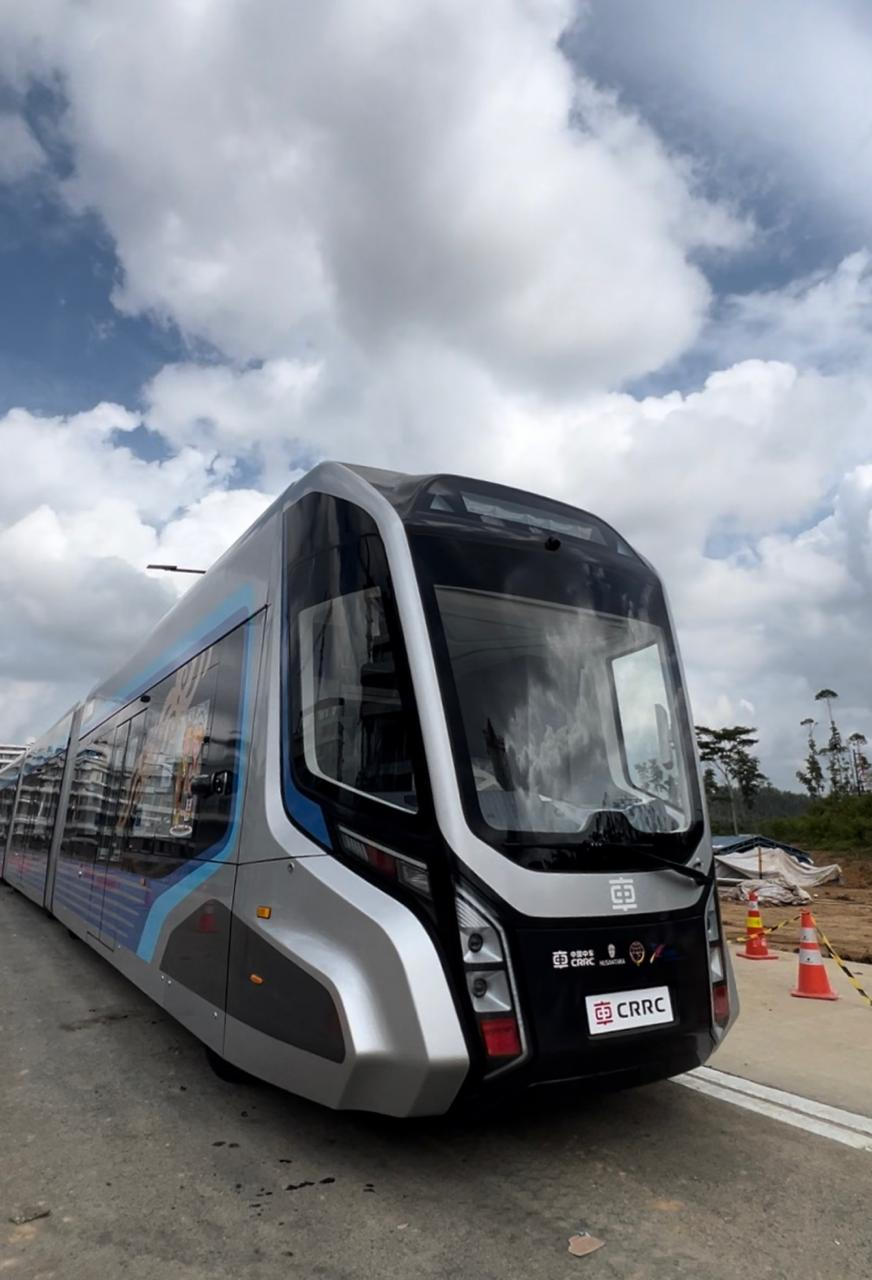
ART bus in Nusantara, Indonesia

- Malaysia. On 1 February 2024, a pilot project for a Putrajaya-based ART system was launched by Putrajaya Corporation (PjC), with projected trial runs lasting throughout the year. In February 2026, PjC revealed that it would no longer proceed with the ART proposal due to high implementation costs.
- Indonesia. The system was considered for use in Nusantara, the future capital city. The bus has been delivered in July 2024, was showcased in August 2024 at the time of the Independence Day, and tested 12 September to 22 October 2024. It was decided to stop the project and return the bus to China because it cannot operate autonomously. Based on the results of the trial or Proof of Concept (PoC), the tram made by CRRC Qingdao Sifang requires manual intervention because the automatic control system is not yet functioning optimally. In addition, there are three reasons from the assessment team, namely the inability of the tram to operate fully autonomously, the system performance that has not been fully tested, and the autonomous braking system that is not yet optimal.

== See also ==
- Automatic train operation
- Automated guideway transit
- Articulated bus
- Bi-articulated bus
- Battery electric bus
- Bus Rapid Transit
- Capacitor electric vehicle#Capabus
- Charging station
- Electric road
- Electric bus
- Fuel cell bus
- Gadgetbahn
- Guided bus
- Guide rail
- Personal rapid transit
- Rubber-tyred metro
- Rubber-tyred tram
- Translohr
- Trolleybus
- Trackless train
- Transit Elevated Bus (TEB)
- In-motion charging electric bus
- List of battery operated trams
- Ground-level power supply
- Solar bus
- Wright StreetCar
