= List of acts of the Parliament of Western Australia from 1914 =

This is a list of acts of the Parliament of Western Australia for the year 1914.

== 1914 ==
Short title, or popular name	Citation	Royal assent
Long title
	No. 1 of 1914	2 July 1914
An Act to apply out of the Consolidated Revenue Fund the sum of Six Hundred and Seventy-six Thousand Five Hundred and Forty-five Pounds; (Note: £676,545 in 1914 is equivalent to A$89,800,000 in 2022.) and from Moneys to Credit of the General Loan Fund, Six Hundred and Three Thousand One Hundred and Five Pounds; (Note: £603,105 in 1914 is equivalent to A$80,100,000 in 2022.) and from the Loan Suspense Account, One Hundred Thousand Pounds (Note: £100,000 in 1914 is equivalent to A$13,300,000 in 2022.) to the Service of the Year ending 30th June, 1915.
Land Tax and Income Tax Act 1914	No. 2 of 1914	8 August 1914
An Act to impose a Land Tax and an Income Tax.
	No. 3 of 1914	8 August 1914
An Act to apply out of the Public Account the sum of Two Hundred and Thirty Thousand Eight Hundred and Thirty Pounds (Note: £230,830 in 1914 is equivalent to A$30,600,000 in 2022.) for the purpose of temporary advances to be made by the Colonial Treasurer.
Registration of Births, Deaths, and Marriages Act Amendment Act 1914	No. 4 of 1914	8 August 1914
An Act to amend the Registration of Births, Deaths, and Marriages Act, 1894. (Note: Registration of Births, Deaths, and Marriages Act 1894 (58 Vict. No. 16))
Control of Trade in War Time Act 1914	No. 5 of 1914	8 August 1914
An Act to regulate the Sale of the Necessaries of Life during War.
Royal Commissioners' Powers Act Amendment Act 1914	No. 6 of 1914	8 August 1914
An Act to amend the Royal Commissioners' Powers Act, 1902. (Note: Royal Commissioners' Powers Act 1902 (1 & 2 Edw. VII. No. 28))
Cottesloe Rates Validation Act 1914	No. 7 of 1914	8 September 1914
An Act to validate the Rates made by the Council of the Municipality of Cottesloe.
Melville Tramways Act 1914	No. 8 of 1914	8 September 1914
An Act to authorise the Melville Road Board to construct and work Tramways within the Melville Road District, and for other relative purposes.
Foodstuffs Commission Act 1914	No. 9 of 1914	8 September 1914
An Act relating to the Distribution, Export, and Prices of Foodstuffs and other Commodities, and to compel the supplying of Information in relation thereto.
Bunbury Motor-bus Service Act 1914	No. 10 of 1914	8 September 1914
An Act to enable the Municipality of Bunbury to undertake the business of carrying Passengers for Hire, and for that purpose to provide, maintain, and use Motor-buses, and for other relative purposes.
Osborne Park Tramways Purchase Act 1914	No. 11 of 1914	8 September 1914
An Act to authorise the Purchase by the Government of Western Australia of the Osborne Park Tramways, and for other purposes.
Agricultural Bank Act Amendment Act 1914	No. 12 of 1914	8 September 1914
An Act to further amend the Agricultural Bank Act, 1906. (Note: Agricultural Bank Act 1906 (No. 15))
Friendly Societies Act Amendment Act 1914	No. 13 of 1914	8 September 1914
An Act to amend the Friendly Societies Act, 1894. (Note: Friendly Societies Act 1894 (58 Vict. No. 23))
Kingia Grass Tree Concession Confirmation Act 1914	No. 14 of 1914	8 September 1914
An Act to confirm, ratify, and give legal effect to an Agreement made between the Minister for Lands and Emanuel Francis Benjamin and his assigns, dated the twenty-sixth day of June, nineteen hundred and fourteen.
	No. 15 of 1914	8 September 1914
An Act to apply out of the Consolidated Revenue Fund the sum of One Million Two Hundred and Fifty Thousand Pounds; and from Moneys to Credit of the General Loan Fund, Two Hundred Thousand Pounds, to the Service of the Year ending 30th June, 1915.
Workers' Homes Act Amendment Act 1914	No. 16 of 1914	8 September 1914
An Act to amend the Workers' Homes Act, 1911. (Note: Workers' Homes Act 1911 (No. 8 of 1912))
Special Lease Enabling Act 1914	No. 17 of 1914	8 September 1914
An Act to ratify an agreement for a Special Lease of Crown Land in the Kimberley Division, for Tropical Agriculture and Horticulture.
Leederville Rates Validation Act 1914	No. 18 of 1914	22 September 1914
An Act to validate the Rates made by the Council of the Municipality of Leederville.
Rights in Water and Irrigation Act 1914	No. 19 of 1914	22 September 1914
An Act relating to Rights in Natural Waters, to make provision for the Conservation and Utilisation of Water for Industrial Irrigation, and for the Construction, Maintenance, and Management of Irrigation Works, and for other purposes.
Perth Municipal Gas and Electric Lighting Act Amendment Act 1914	No. 20 of 1914	22 September 1914
An Act to amend the Perth Municipal Gas and Electric Lighting Act, 1911. (Note: Perth Municipal Gas and Electric Lighting Act 1911 (No. 2))
Geraldton Agricultural and Horticultural Society's Land Act 1914	No. 21 of 1914	22 September 1914
An Act to enable the Trustees of the Geraldton Agricultural and Horticultural Society to sell Geraldton Suburban Lot B, and to apply the proceeds thereof for the purposes of such Society.
Licensing Act Amendment Act 1914	No. 22 of 1914	22 September 1914
An Act to amend the Licensing Act, 1911. (Note: Licensing Act 1911 (No. 32))
Plant Diseases Act 1914	No. 23 of 1914	22 September 1914
An Act to prevent the Introduction into Western Australia of Diseases affecting Plants, to provide for Ethe Eradication of such Diseases and to prevent the Spread thereof, and to amend and consolidate the Law relating to such matters.
Bills of Sale Act Amendment Act 1914	No. 24 of 1914	22 September 1914
An Act to amend the Bills of Sale Act, 1899. (Note: Bills of Sale Act 1899 (63 Vict. No. 45))
Eastern Railway Siding Act 1914	No. 25 of 1914	22 September 1914
An Act to authorise the Construction, Maintenance, and Working of a Siding connected with the Eastern Railway at East Perth.
Postponement of Debts Act 1914	No. 26 of 1914	22 September 1914
An Act to authorise the Postponement by Proclamation of the Payment of Debts.
City of Perth Act 1914	No. 27 of 1914	22 December 1914
An Act to unite the City of Perth and the Municipalities of North Perth and Leederyille.

== Sources ==
- "legislation.wa.gov.au".
