= Oxford Street (disambiguation) =

Oxford Street is a major road and shopping street in London, England, UK.

Oxford Street may also refer to:

- Oxford Street, Perth, Australia
- Oxford Street, Sydney, Australia
- Oxford Street, Swansea, Wales
- Oxford Street, Manchester, England — also known as Oxford Road
- Oxford Street, London, Ontario
- Oxford Street, Singapore, a road in Seletar
