= List of acts of the Parliament of Western Australia from 1897 =

This is a list of acts of the Parliament of Western Australia for the year 1897.

== 1897 ==
=== Public acts ===
Short title, or popular name	Citation	Royal assent
Long title
	60 Vict. No. 45	12 March 1897
An Act to apply out of the Consolidated Revenue Fund and the General Loan Fund the sum of Seven Hundred and Fifty Thousand Pounds (Note: £750,000 in 1897 is equivalent to A$129,200,000 in 2022.) to the Service of the Year ending 30th June, 1898.
Australasian Federation Enabling Act 1896 Amendment Act 1897	60 Vict. No. 46	12 March 1897
An Act to amend the Australasian Federation Enabling Act of 1896, (Note: Australasian Federation Enabling Act 1896 (60 Vict. No. 32)) and for other purposes.
Treasury Bills Act Amendment Act 1897	61 Vict. No. 1	
	61 Vict. No. 2	26 August 1897
An Act to apply out of the Consolidated Revenue Fund and from Moneys to Credit of the General Loan Fund the sum of Eight Hundred and Fifty Thousand Pounds (Note: £850,000 in 1897 is equivalent to A$146,400,000 in 2022.) to the Service of the Year ending 30th June, 1898.
	61 Vict. No. 3	26 August 1897
An Act for the Election of a Representative of Western Australia in the Convention provided for by the Australasian Federation Enabling Act of 1896.
	61 Vict. No. 4	26 August 1897
An Act to re-establish the title of the Hainault Gold Mine, Limited, to the Gold Mining Lease No. 81E.
Aborigines Act 1897	61 Vict. No. 5	11 December 1897
An Act to further amend the Constitution Act of 1889, (Note: Constitution Act 1889 (52 Vict. No. 23)) and for the better Protection of the Aboriginal Race of Western Australia.
	61 Vict. No. 6	11 December 1897
An Act to confirm certain Expenditure for the year ending 30th June, One thousand eight hundred and ninety-six.
Hawkers and Pedlars Act 1892 Amendment Act 1897	61 Vict. No. 7	
Local Inscribed Stock Act 1897	61 Vict. No. 8	
	61 Vict. No. 9	11 December 1897
An Act for the Re-appropriation of Portions of Certain Moneys appropriated by the Loan Act of 1896, (Note: Loan Act 1896 (60 Vict. No. 28)) and by the Loan Consolidation Act of 1896, (Note: Loan Consolidation Act 1896 (60 Vict. No. 29)) respectively.
	61 Vict. No. 10	11 December 1897
An Act to apply out of the Consolidated Revenue Fund the sum of Three Hundred and Fifty Thousand Pounds (Note: £350,000 in 1897 is equivalent to A$60,300,000 in 2022.) to the Service of the Year ending 30th June, 1898.
Auctioneers Act 1873 Further Amendment Act 1897	61 Vict. No. 11	
	61 Vict. No. 12	23 December 1897
An Act to amend the High School Act, 1876. (Note: High School Act 1876 (40 Vict. No. 8))
Immigration Restriction Act 1897	61 Vict. No. 13	
Registration of Firms Act 1897	61 Vict. No. 14	
	61 Vict. No. 15	23 December 1897
An Act to secure an Annuity to Dame Mary Ann Broome (Note: Widow of Sir Frederick Napier Broome, former Governor of Western Australia.) for Life.
Bunbury Racecourse Railway Act 1897	61 Vict. No. 16	23 December 1897
An Act to authorise the Construction of a Railway from the Bunbury-Boyanup Railway to the Bunbury Racecourse.
Collie Quarry Railway Act 1897	61 Vict. No. 17	23 December 1897
An Act to authorise the Construction of a Railway from the South-Western Railway to the Collie Quarry.
Kalgoorlie–Gnumballa Lake and Boulder Townsite Loop Railways Act 1897	61 Vict. No. 18	23 December 1897
An Act to authorise the Construction of a Railway from Kalgoorlie to Gnumballa Lake, and also a Loop Railway from the Kalgoorlie-Gnumballa Lake Line to the Boulder Townsite.
	61 Vict. No. 19	23 December 1897
An Act to extend the provisions of the Sharks Bay Pearl Shell Fishery Act, 1892, (Note: Sharks Bay Pearl Shell Fishery Act 1892 (55 Vict. No. 9)) to other places.
Workmen's Lien Act 1897	61 Vict. No. 20	
	61 Vict. No. 21	23 December 1897
An Act to apply a sum out of the Consolidated Revenue Fund and from Moneys to Credit of the General Loan Fund to the Services of the Year ending the last day of June, One thousand eight hundred and ninety-eight, and to appropriate the Supplies granted in this Session of Parliament.
Steam Boilers Act 1897	61 Vict. No. 22	
Cemeteries Act 1897	61 Vict. No. 23	
Employment Brokers Act 1897	61 Vict. No. 24	
Sale of Liquors Amendment Act 1897	61 Vict. No. 25	
Industrial Statistics Act 1897	61 Vict. No. 26	
Imported Labour Registry Act 1897	61 Vict. No. 27	
Circuit Courts Act 1897	61 Vict. No. 28	
	61 Vict. No. 29	23 December 1897
An Act to authorise the Closing of certain Roads and Streets.
City of Perth Tramways Act 1897	61 Vict. No. 30	23 December 1897
An Act to confirm a Provisional Order Authorising the Construction of Tramways in the City of Perth.
	Provisional Order.	
Fremantle–Owen's Anchorage Railway Act 1897	61 Vict. No. 31	23 December 1897
An Act to authorise the Construction of a Railway from Fremantle to Owen's Anchorage.
Railways Amendment Act 1897	61 Vict. No. 32	
Mining on Private Property Act 1897	61 Vict. No. 33	
Agricultural Lands Purchase Amendment Act 1897	61 Vict. No. 34	
Companies Act Amendment Act 1897	61 Vict. No. 35	23 December 1897
An Act to amend the Companies Act, 1893.
	61 Vict. No. 36	23 December 1897
An Act to confirm certain Expenditure for the year ending 30th June, One thousand eight hundred and ninety-seven.

=== Private acts ===
Short title, or popular name	Citation	Royal assent
Long title
Perth Gas Company's Act 1886 Further Amendment Act 1897	61 Vict. Private Act	8 November 1897
An Act to further amend the Perth Gas Company's Act, 1886, (Note: Perth Gas Company's Act 1886 (50 Vict. No. 33)) and for other purposes.

== Sources ==
- "legislation.wa.gov.au".
