= ISWA =

ISWA may refer to:

- Islamic State – West Africa Province
- International Solid Waste Association
- International School of Western Australia
- International Sign Writing Alphabet
