= Shweeb =

Proposed personal rapid transit network

Coordinates: 38.087706°S 176.190555°E

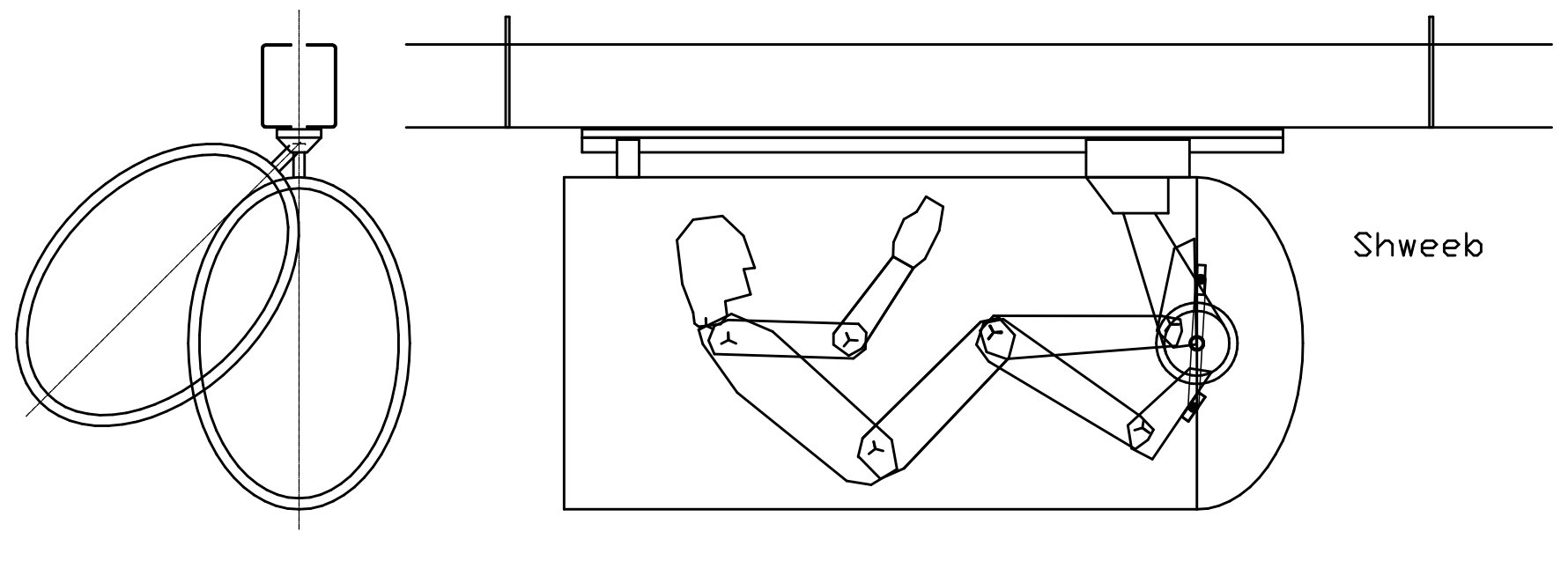
A single Shweeb car

Shweeb is a proposed personal rapid transit network in New Zealand, based on human-powered monorail cars. The project prototype was originally designed and implemented in Rotorua, New Zealand, as a leisure attraction. The name is a reference to the German "zu schweben" meaning "to hang/hover/levitate", and indirectly to the suspended monorail Schwebebahn Wuppertal.

The proposed Shweeb transit network relies on recumbent bicycle technology to power pods suspended from monorails. According to Shweeb Monorail Technology, the intent of their proposal is to "create a solution which provided the user with the same flexibility and comfort offered by the car but without the consequential costs - both direct financial and indirect health and environmental costs." The proposal envisions networks of monorail track providing point to point and commuter transit for urban areas.

== Proposals ==
In September 2010, a proposal for development of an expanded network was chosen to receive a million dollars of funding from Google as part of project 10^{100}. As of August 2017, there were no active proposals to utilise the system for public transportation although a "sport resort" in the United States is considering it. In January 2021, a proposal was made for a Shweeb track be built as an attraction in a planned stadium in Christchurch, New Zealand. The monorail would be suspended out from main frame of the new stadium.

The original track in Rotorua, New Zealand is open to the public.

== Technical ==
=== Track ===
The track is built in folded galvanised steel. Its external height and width is 220 by 200 millimetres (8.7 in × 7.9 in). Support piles are also in galvanised steel.

=== Pods ===
Pods are covered with transparent plastic sheets, with ventilation holes. Front and rear long dampers are provided to limit the impact acceleration in case of pods collision and to ease the association of pods to build 'pod trains' which could significantly improve overall aerodynamic efficiency.

=== External power boost ===
To help climb ramps, an electrically powered chain installed on a track section could push the pods for a limited distance, in a way similar to the Trampe bicycle lift. This could also help entering stations built at a higher elevation than the track. The purpose of this elevation is to help a pod gain momentum while descending from station track to the main line track.

== See also ==
- Hotchkiss Bicycle Railroad
- WireRoad/Tarbato, a pedal powered suspended monorail developed in Nepal in 2004
- Velomobile
- Schwebebahn
- Suspended monorail
- Gadgetbahn
