= Trams in Perth =

Former tramway network in Perth, Western Australia

Perth tramway network
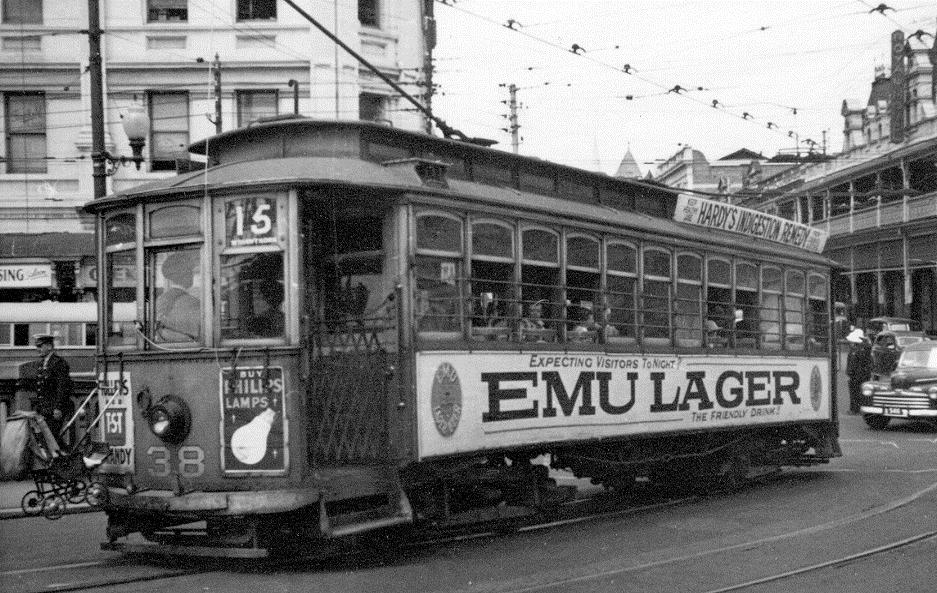
- Tram 38 on Horseshoe Bridge, 1950

Operation
- Locale: Perth, Western Australia
- Open: 28 September 1899
- Close: 19 July 1958
- Status: Closed
- Owners: Perth Electric Tramways Limited; (1899–1913); Western Australian Government; (1913–1958)
- Operators: Perth Electric Tramways Limited; (1899–1913); Western Australian Government Railways; (1913–1949); Western Australian Government Tramways & Ferries; (1949–1958)

Infrastructure
- Track gauge: 3 ft 6 in (1,067 mm)
- Propulsion system: Electricity
- Electrification: Overhead catenary
- Depot: East Perth

Statistics
- Route length: Over 50 km (31 mi) (max)

The Perth tramway network served Perth, the capital city of Western Australia, from 1899 until 1958. The network was initially run by a private company, but was taken over by the state government in 1913. From a single line along Hay Street, the network expanded northeast as far as Osborne Park, east as far as Welshpool, south as far as Como, and west as far as Claremont. The tramways were gradually replaced by buses after World War II.

The port city of Fremantle and surrounds were served by a separate, non-connected network.

== History ==
=== Horse tram ===
According to one source, the central city terminus of the short lived horse tramway was the General Post Office, which was then located within the Treasury Building, at the corner of St Georges Terrace and Barrack Street. The outlying terminus was said by the same source to be in East Perth. However, it now seems that there was never a horse tram provided for the carriage of passengers in Perth.

Rather, there was – it is believed – a horse tramway which ran from quarries just north of the city to the construction site of Government House situated at St Georges Terrace. For how long the horse tramway survived is not known, nor its exact route. It is known, however, that a horse omnibus system did exist.

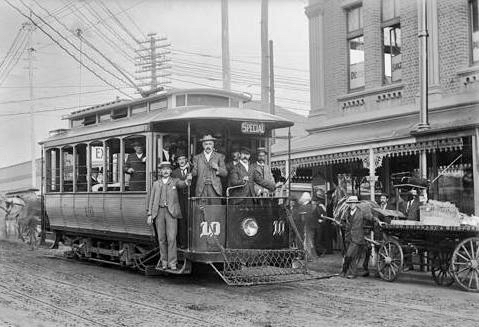
Opening of the William and Wellington Streets line, 1902

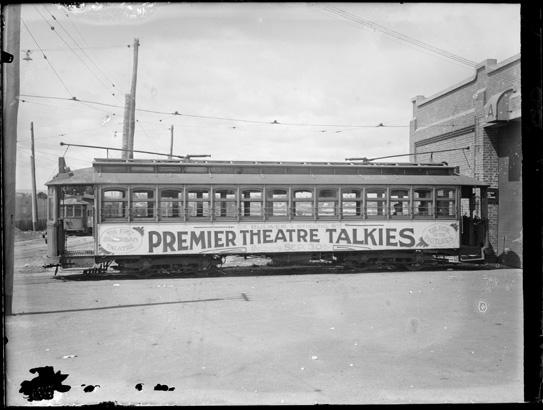
Perth tram at East Perth car barn, 1929

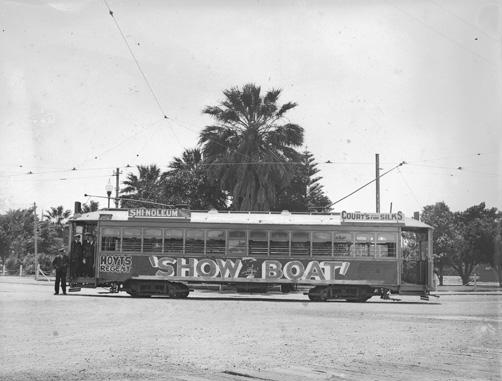
Perth tram on the network, 1929

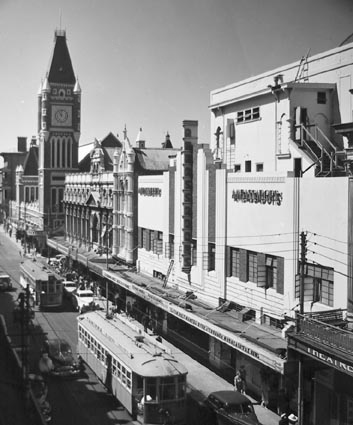
Trams in Hay Street, 1949

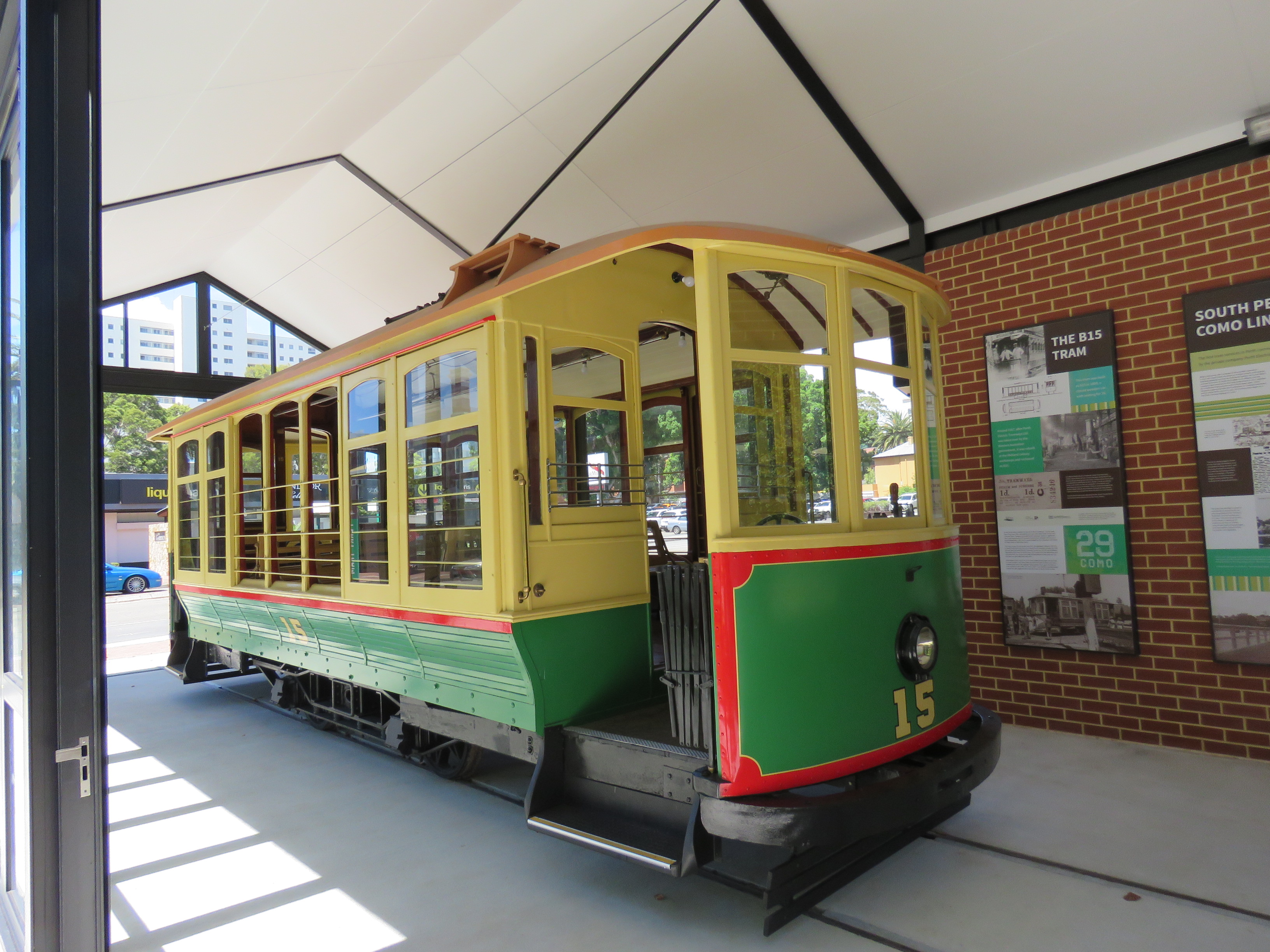
The restored B15 Tram, built in 1899, on display in South Perth

=== Electric trams ===
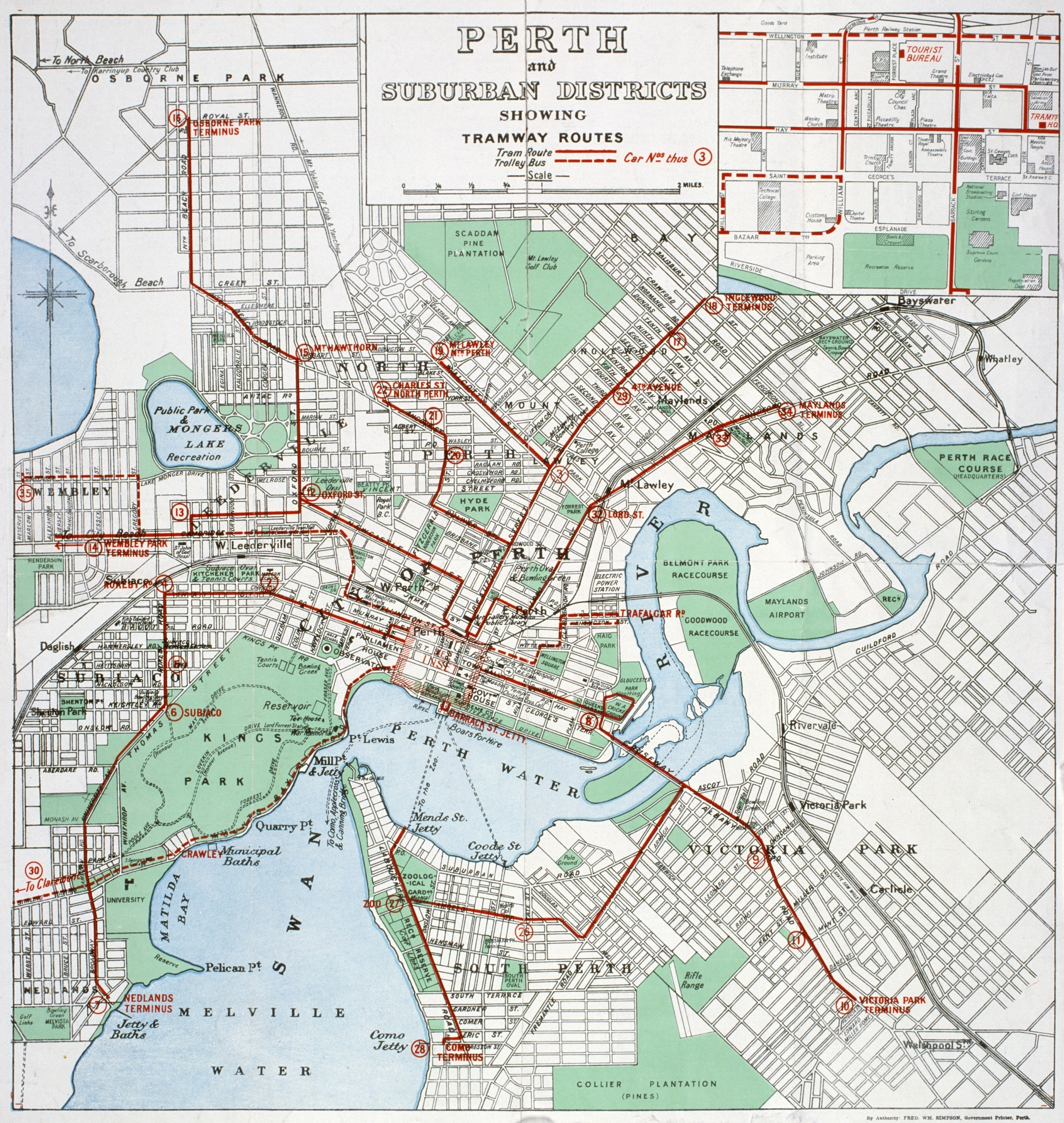
Map of Perth suburban tramways in 1939

The initial Perth tramway was operated by an English company, Perth Electric Tramways Limited. Construction started on 30 January 1899, with services commencing on 28 September 1899. The first line ran 4.8 kilometres (3.0 mi) along Hay Street, from East Perth near the WACA Ground to Thomas Street in West Perth. There was a spur line along Colin Street to Kings Park.

Further lines opened were:

- Subiaco: along Hay Street and Rokeby Road to Thomas Street
- Nedlands: extension from Subiaco along Thomas Street and Broadway to Nedlands Baths
- Wellington Street East via Hill Street and Kensington Street to Trafalgar Road
- Wellington Street West to Thomas Street
- Mounts Bay Road to Point Lewis
- Mount Lawley via Beaufort Street and Walcott Street to York Street
- Victoria Park via The Causeway and Albany Highway
- Lincoln Street via Lord Street
- North Perth via Bulwer Street and Fitzgerald Street to Albert Street
- Leederville via Newcastle Street and Oxford Street
- Osborne Park extension from Leederville along Main Street to Royal Street

These routes, together with other city track resulted in a 37-kilometre (23 mi) network by June 1913. At that time there were 53 trams in the fleet: 44 four-wheel single truck cars, and nine larger bogie cars.

The Beaufort Street lines ran from a terminus at Barrack Square, which connected with the ferry service from Barrack Street Jetty.

Under the franchise agreement entered into by the Perth Electric Tramways, the Perth City Council was able to take ownership of the tramways upon its expiry. However the state government took ownership of the network by passing the Tramways Purchase Act 1912, which cancelled the reversionary rights held by the council. The Nedlands line transferred on 29 May 1913, followed by the other lines on 1 July 1913. The Osborne Park line that was operated by Town Properties was taken over by the government in December 1914 under the Osborne Park Tramways Purchase Act 1914.

The tramway network was operated by the Western Australian Government Railways (WAGR) until April 1949 when a separate Western Australian Government Tramways and Ferries department was established.

As the city expanded so did the tram network with the following openings between 1913 and 1930:

- Nedlands extension of Mounts Bay Road line to Nedlands Baths
- Inglewood via Beaufort Street to Dundas Road
- Claremont via Thomas Street and Stirling Highway
- South Perth Zoo via The Causeway and Angelo Street
- Como from Mends Street Jetty via Labouchere Road
- Maylands along Guildford Road to Ferguson Street
- Mount Lawley, Walcott Street to Blake Street
- Claremont via Mounts Bay Road and Stirling Highway
- Westana Road from Claremont station via Victoria Avenue
- Wembley via Woolwich Street and Cambridge Street to Nanson Street

The Wellington Street West line had been abandoned by early 1920s while the Colin Street to Kings Park Road was abandoned in 1930.

In the 1930s, the following extensions opened:

- Inglewood to Salisbury Street
- Victoria Park to Patricia Street
- Wembley to Alexander Street

The Westana Road to Claremont station section closed in 1935 and the Crawley to Nedlands line in 1938, while the Wellington Street East, Claremont and Wembley services were replaced by trolleybuses.

In the early 1940s, the final extensions opened:

- Inglewood line extended by 400 metres (1,300 ft) to reach Grand Promenade
- Victoria Park line extended by 1.6 kilometres (0.99 mi) to serve the munitions factory at Welshpool

Over a ten-year period beginning in 1948, all of the lines were gradually replaced by buses. The last tram ran on 19 July 1958.

== Rolling stock ==
Over the years, a total of 130 trams were operated. Early examples were manufactured by JG Brill Company, Jackson & Sharp and St Louis Car Company in the United States, with later examples by the WAGR's Midland Railway Workshops.

The trams were originally painted bright red; in 1903 a darker shade of red was introduced. This was later replaced by WAGR red with gold lining. In 1927, a light grey livery was adopted and then in the 1930s the same cream and green livery as worn by the trolleybuses.

Some of the trams from the former Perth network have been preserved by the Perth Electric Tramway Society, at its heritage tramway in Whiteman Park.

== Patronage ==
Perth tram patronage
| FY | Patronage | ±% p.a. |
|---|---|---|
| 1900 | 4,000,000 | — |
| 1910 | 6,800,000 | +5.45% |
| 1920 | 18,900,000 | +10.76% |
| 1930 | 34,900,000 | +6.33% |
| 1940 | 31,900,000 | −0.89% |
| 1945 | 50,400,000 | +9.58% |
| 1950 | 35,400,000 | −6.82% |
| 1960 | 0 | −100.00% |
Source: Bureau of Infrastructure & Transport Research Economics

== Future developments ==
While Perth's original tram network ceased operations in 1958, recent years have witnessed renewed interest in tram and light rail systems as sustainable urban transport solutions.

=== Whiteman Park Tram Extension ===
As part of the METRONET Morley–Ellenbrook Line project, the heritage tram line at Whiteman Park is being extended by 1.6 kilometres (0.99 mi) to connect with the new Whiteman Park Station. This extension aims to enhance both tourism and public transport integration, offering a 27-minute train ride between the park and Perth's CBD. The project is a collaboration between METRONET and the Perth Electric Tramway Society.

=== Trackless Tram ===
The City of Stirling has proposed a 7-kilometre (4.3 mi) trackless tram route along Scarborough Beach Road, connecting Stirling Station and Glendalough Station to Scarborough Beach. This initiative, supported by A$2 million in federal funding, aims to alleviate congestion and promote sustainable transport. Trackless trams, which operate on rubber tires without tracks, offer the benefits of light rail with reduced infrastructure costs.

Additionally, Curtin University has proposed a city-wide trackless tram network, with a trial line connecting Burswood Station to St Georges Terrace and a north–south link along Beaufort Street to Morley. This proposal envisions a metropolitan tram network across Perth by 2030.

=== Light Rail ===
The Western Australian Government's Public Transport blueprint includes plans for a Perth Light Rail system, creating an inner orbital route providing high-frequency services between key locations such as the University of Western Australia, Queen Elizabeth II Medical Centre, Canning Bridge, Perth CBD, and Curtin University. However, these projects are subject to prioritization and funding decisions by successive governments.

Infrastructure WA has recommended developing a business case for light rail and/or bus rapid transit as the next stage of major public transport investment in Perth, particularly focusing on the Perth CBD and inner and middle suburbs.

== See also ==
- History of Perth, Western Australia § Later 19th century (1870 - 1901)
- Trams in Fremantle
- Trams in Australia

== Sources ==
- Brimson, Samuel (1983). The Tramways of Australia. Sydney: Dreamweaver Books. pp. 158–167. ISBN 0-949825-01-8.
- Culpeffer-Cooke, Tony; Gunzburg, Adrian; Pleydell, Ian (2010). Tracks by the Swan: The Electric Tram and Trolleybus Era of Perth, Western Australia. Mount Lawley: Perth Electric Tramway Society. ISBN 978-0-9807577-0-5.
- Perth Electric Tramway Society; Brown, David (2013). "Home". Perth Electric Tramway Society.
  - Perth Electric Tramway Society; Brown, David (2013a). "Restoration of WAGT 66". In Perth Electric Tramway Society & Brown (2013).
  - Perth Electric Tramway Society; Brown, David (2013b). "PETS Tramcar Collection: Tram and Trolleybus Fleet". In Perth Electric Tramway Society & Brown (2013).
  - Perth Electric Tramway Society; Brown, David (2013c). "Perth Tramways". In Perth Electric Tramway Society & Brown (2013).
