= Villagetech Solutions =

VillageTech Solutions began with EcoSystems (Nepal) in 1996, to improve living standards for rural people by creating affordable energy and transport products. VTS creates inexpensive technology by focusing creative talent on problems ignored by commercial investors because the solutions are intentionally easily copied, and the markets are distorted by conflicting cultures, governments, subsidies and real conflict.

The VTS mission is to apply simple, locally appropriate technology to problems in education, transportation, health and economic development.

VTS is the American non-profit offshoot of EcoSystems Pvt Ltd in Nepal, founded by David and Haydi Sowerwine in 1996 to provide ‘energy and transport solutions’ in Nepal where they lived for 14 years. In that time EcoSystems built 38 “WireBridges” across Himalayan rivers to connect villagers with medical care, schools and trade. Since 1998 the bridges have moved an estimated 3.5 million passengers without harm.

In 2009 the Sowerwines launched a successor WireBridge builder in Kathmandu, the locally owned and operated: VillageSolutions Pvt. Ltd.

VTS won the esteemed Tech Museum Award in 2003.

== Rural Education ==
VillageTech Solutions is developing Looma for use in rural schools in Nepal and elsewhere.

Looma is an affordable, battery-powered (12V, 55W) audiovisual device that brings a large library of content and enhanced learning media tools to village schools that have never seen electricity, computers, or in some cases, even books.

Looma is a small box that contains a computer, 700 lumen projector, interactive whiteboard, and audio system, all in one. Looma projects an image onto a wall, and a simple user interface allows teachers who may be unaccustomed to computers to navigate through screens intuitively using a handheld wand. It comes pre-loaded with textbooks for the country of use and a rich set of multimedia enhancements. Looma’s web browser allows the class to explore the Internet if WiFi is available.

The Looma prototype is being used in twelve school in Nepal. Enhancements such as webcam, microphone, and dual-wand control are just a few of the features planned for future versions.

== Arsenic Removal from Well Water ==
In 2008 David challenged a Dartmouth engineering student team to take on a social change project. The project was a system for removing arsenic from groundwater in a geology that runs from Nepal to Bangladesh. In April 2009, the team demonstrated their prototype, inexpensive household-scale system that cuts arsenic concentrations to below the World Health Organization standard of 10 ppb and in a region where villagers’ well water often ranges beyond 200 ppb.

Confirming the merit of their discovery, the sponsors of the Collegiate Inventors Competition (US Patent Office, Inventors Hall of Fame, and Abbott Foundation) awarded the top prize for USA undergraduate innovators to the Thayer School of Engineering team in October 2009.

The arsenic removal system is called SafaPani. VTS suspended work on the arsenic system in 2007 to focus on the Looma project.

== WireBridge Project ==
VTS supported the building of 38 WireBridges in Nepal. The WireBridge is a low-cost shuttle carriage suspended on two or four high-tensile strength wires. This carriage offers all-weather transport, requires little maintenance, poses no threat to children, uses no fossil fuel, provides low-skill jobs, and costs less than a good conventional bridge. The WireBridge is adapted from a business “best practice" transport system developed by the global banana industry.

At each end of a bridge stands a tall steel post. The ends of the WireBridge are at exactly the same height. A carriage, holding up to five or six people plus goods, hangs from wheels which roll on the wires suspended between the posts. Passengers and bystanders pull the carriage with a rope.

Building a bridge first involves a site survey that includes terrain, traffic levels, other crossing options, supply of local labor and maintenance. In addition, VTS required that there be significant and demonstrable benefits to local villages in the categories of health, education, commerce, and social integration.

== WireRoad (Tarbato) ==
In 2004 a prototype pedal powered suspended monorail called WireRoad ("tarbato" in Nepalese) was commissioned, adapting the cableway transport systems already in use on banana plantations elsewhere in the world. Specialised vehicles were built with bicycle components. The system, which has some similarities to the Shweeb, does not seem to have been installed anywhere.

== Working with student engineers ==
VillageTech Solutions works extensively with student engineering teams from universities.

- Dartmouth College, Thayer School of Engineering,
- Colorado School of Mines,
- University of California, San Diego,
- Santa Clara University,
- Stanford University,
- Tribhuvan University, Nepal

== VTS honors, awards and exhibits ==
- The Tech Museum of Innovation, San Jose, California Economic Development Award, 2003
- World Bank Development Marketplace Winner, 2006
- World Bank Lighting Africa finalist, 2008
- Rainer Arnhold Fellows Program, fellow 2005-7
- Boston Museum of Science exhibit Engineering is Elementary
- Collegiate Inventors Competition (US Patent Office, Inventors Hall of Fame, and Abbott Foundation), First Place, 2009
