= Hotchkiss Bicycle Railroad =

Purpose-built monorail on which a matching bicycle could be ridden

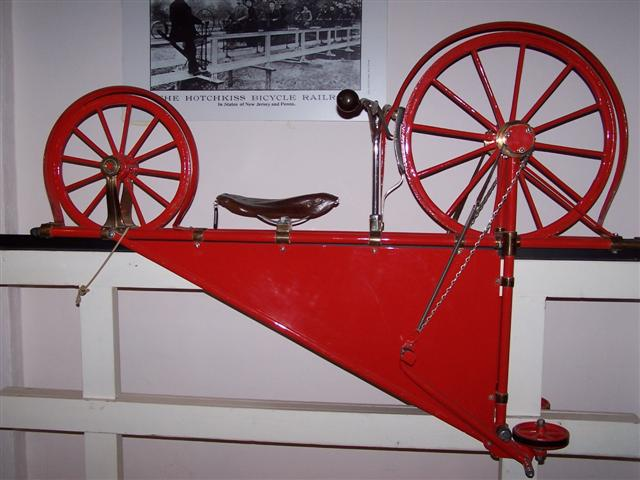
Vehicle from the Mount Holly and Smithville Bicycle Railway, 1892–1898

The Hotchkiss Bicycle Railroad was a purpose-built monorail on which a matching bicycle could be ridden. It was invented by Arthur Hotchkiss, and the first example was built between Smithville and Mount Holly, New Jersey, in 1892. It closed in 1897. Other examples were built in Norfolk from 1895 to 1909, Great Yarmouth, and Blackpool, UK from 1896.

== Smithville – Mount Holly ==
In 1892, Arthur Hotchkiss received a patent for a bicycle railroad and contracted with the H. B. Smith Machine Company to manufacture it. The initial track ran 1.8 miles (2.9 km) from Smithville, in a nearly straight line, crossing the Rancocas Creek 10 times, and arrived at Pine Street, Mount Holly. It was completed in time for the Mount Holly Fair in September, 1892, and the purpose of the railway was supposed to have been enabling employees to commute quickly from Mount Holly to the factory at Smithville. Monthly commuter tickets cost $2.00 (equivalent to $70 today). The record speed on the railway was 4.5 minutes (an average of 24 mph or 39 km/h), and the average trip took 6–7 minutes. The railway was exhibited at the World's Columbian Exposition in 1893. It only had one track so that it was impossible to pass another rider, and if riders travelling in opposite directions met, one had to pull off onto a siding. By 1897 ridership had declined, and the railway fell into disrepair.

== See also ==
- Bicycle railway
- Draisine
- Shweeb
