= Gadgetbahn =

Term for impractical public transport modes

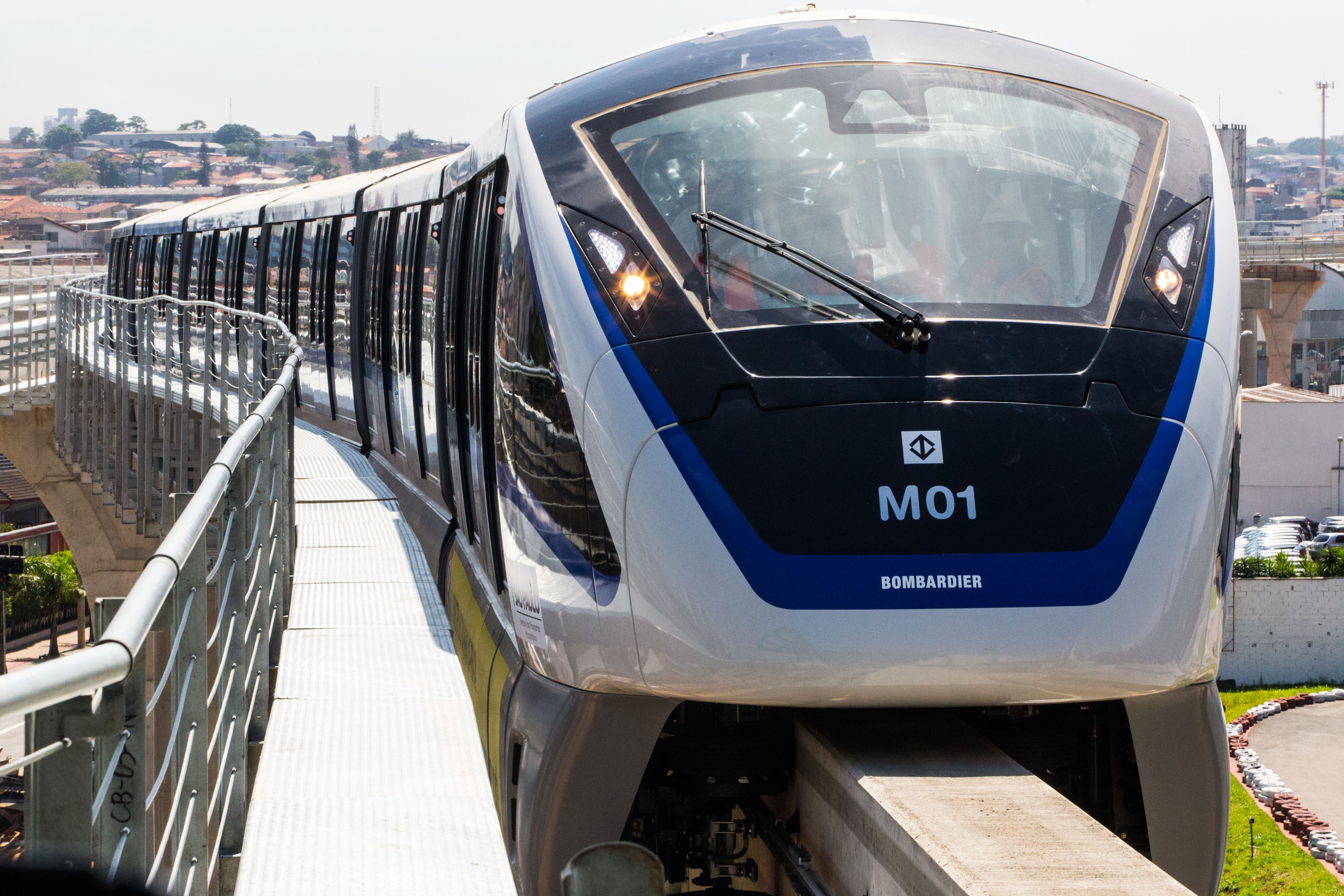
The monorail (the São Paulo Metro Line 15 pictured) is frequently regarded as a gadgetbahn.

Gadgetbahn is a neologism that refers to a public transport concept or implementation that is touted by its developers and supporters as futuristic or innovative, but in practice is less feasible or reliable, and more expensive than traditional modes such as buses, trams and trains. It is a portmanteau of the English word "gadget" and the German word Bahn, meaning "railway". The same mode of transportation can vary in success significantly between implementations. While urban gondola lift systems have sometimes been called gadgetbahns in places poorly suited to them, the Mi Teleférico system in La Paz has 11 lines, 15 second headways, and is being expanded because of high ridership.

== History ==
The term originated in the 21st century, mainly used within the online public transport sphere on Twitter and YouTube. However, such systems existed even before the term was coined. See individual articles for systems for details.

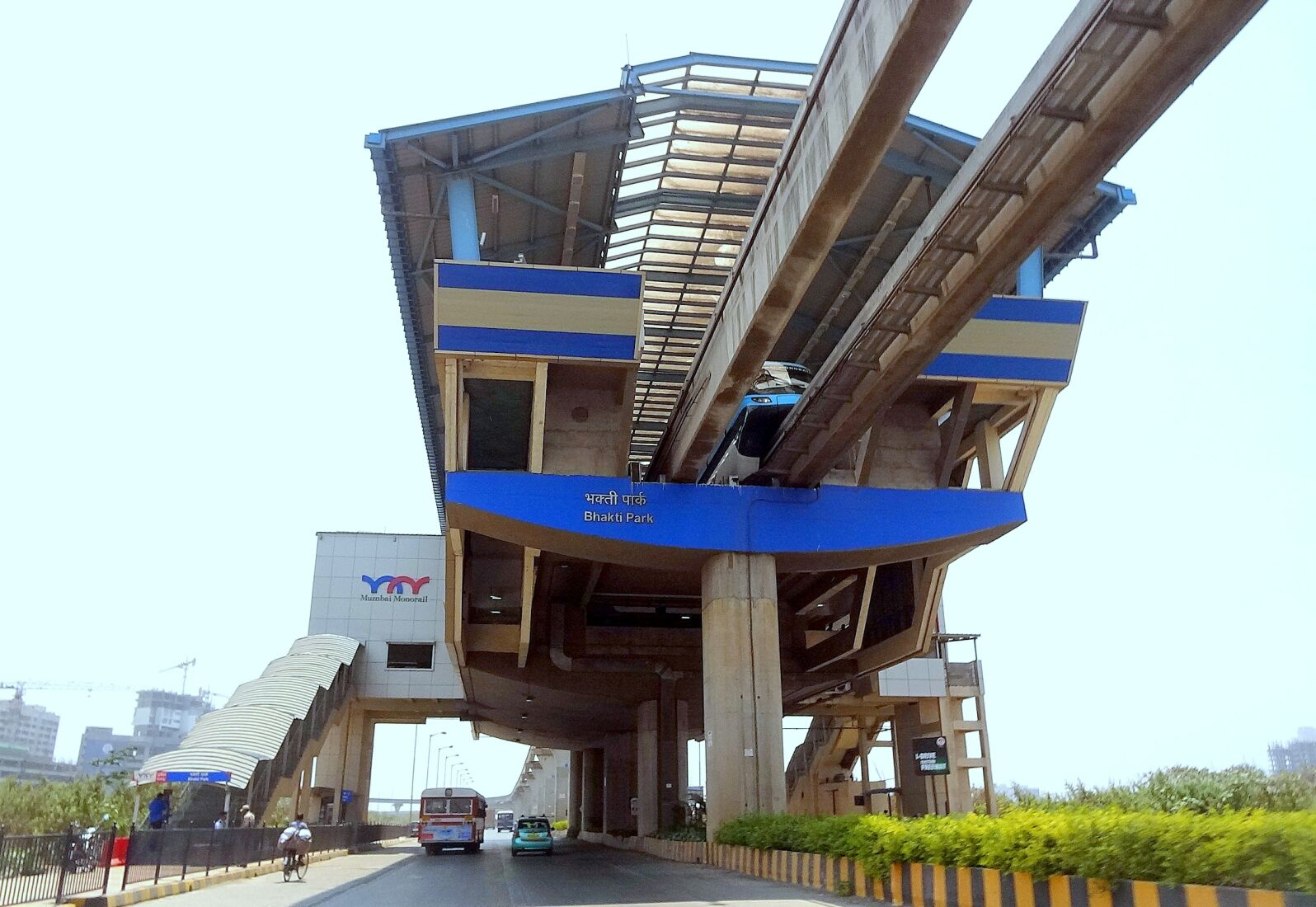
Mumbail Monorail Bhakti Park station

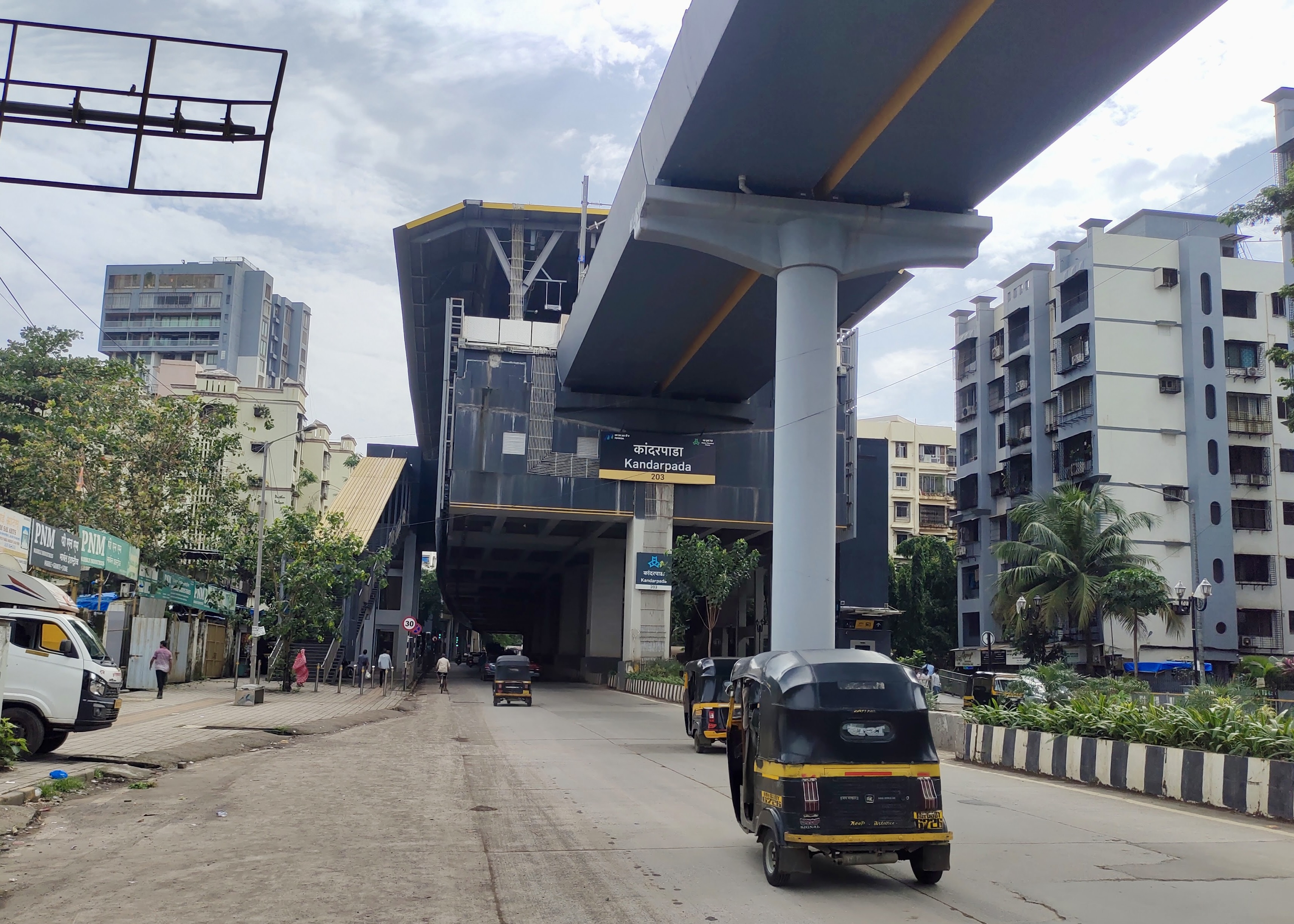
Mumbai Metro Kandarpada station

The problems about cost effectiveness and reliability can be researched with systems that have already been built. The Heathrow Ultra pods report that the elevated guideway cost £30 million for 3.8 kilometres instead of the projected £3 million per kilometre. The study on the Detroit People Mover shows that cost per passenger mile exceeded $3, while Detroit's buses operated at $0.82. Problems with reliability can occur as extended teething problems, as well as with the limited supply of maintenance parts for the specialized vehicles. Studies on the Mumbai Monorail problems led to abandoning all other monorail projects in India.

When proposing an elevated guideway system to avoid the cost of an underground deployment, systems easily get called gadgetbahn when an elevated railway on standard gauge tracks and light rail tram vehicles would have been feasible as well. Comparing the mentioned Mumbai Monorail with the elevated Mumbai Metro shows that construction is not much different as both use pillars in the central median of main roads to ease development in an existing urban environment.

== Examples ==
Modes of transport that have been cited as gadgetbahns include:

- Autonomous rapid transit
- Gondola lift
- Hyperloop
- Monorail
  - Cabinentaxi
  - Shweeb
- Personal rapid transit

== See also ==
- Vaporware, similar concept relating to software
- White elephant, a more general concept
