= Oxford Street, Perth =

Street in Perth, Western Australia

Oxford Street is located in Leederville and Mount Hawthorn in Perth's northern suburbs. It is part of Leederville's town centre.

A tram line along the street closed in 1951.

== History ==
An outdoor theatre, the Mount Hawthorn Picture Gardens was operational at the end of Oxford Street from 1924 near the tram stop, until 1938 when the Ritz Theatre was developed on the corner with Scarborough Beach Road.

The City of Perth opened a public library at 392 Oxford Street, Mount Hawthorn, in 1965.

During the 1990s, the shopping area on the street was redeveloped into a café strip. This decade also saw the construction of the Northern Suburbs Railway (now the Yanchep line), during which time a station was built on the Leederville end of Oxford Street.

== Future ==
In 2022, Community Housing Limited received approval to build 48 social housing apartments in the Mount Hawthorn part of Oxford Street, near a shopping centre, services and public transport.

In May 2026, City of Vincent council proposed to make the street more pedestrian-friendly by possibly closing off Oxford Street entirely.

== Further reqading ==
- Vercoe, Michelle and Davidson, Julie. "Leederville Hotel Part 2". City of Vincent Library & Local History Centre. Archived from the original on 11 June 2026.
