= Glendalough railway station =

Railway station in Perth, Western Australia

Glendalough
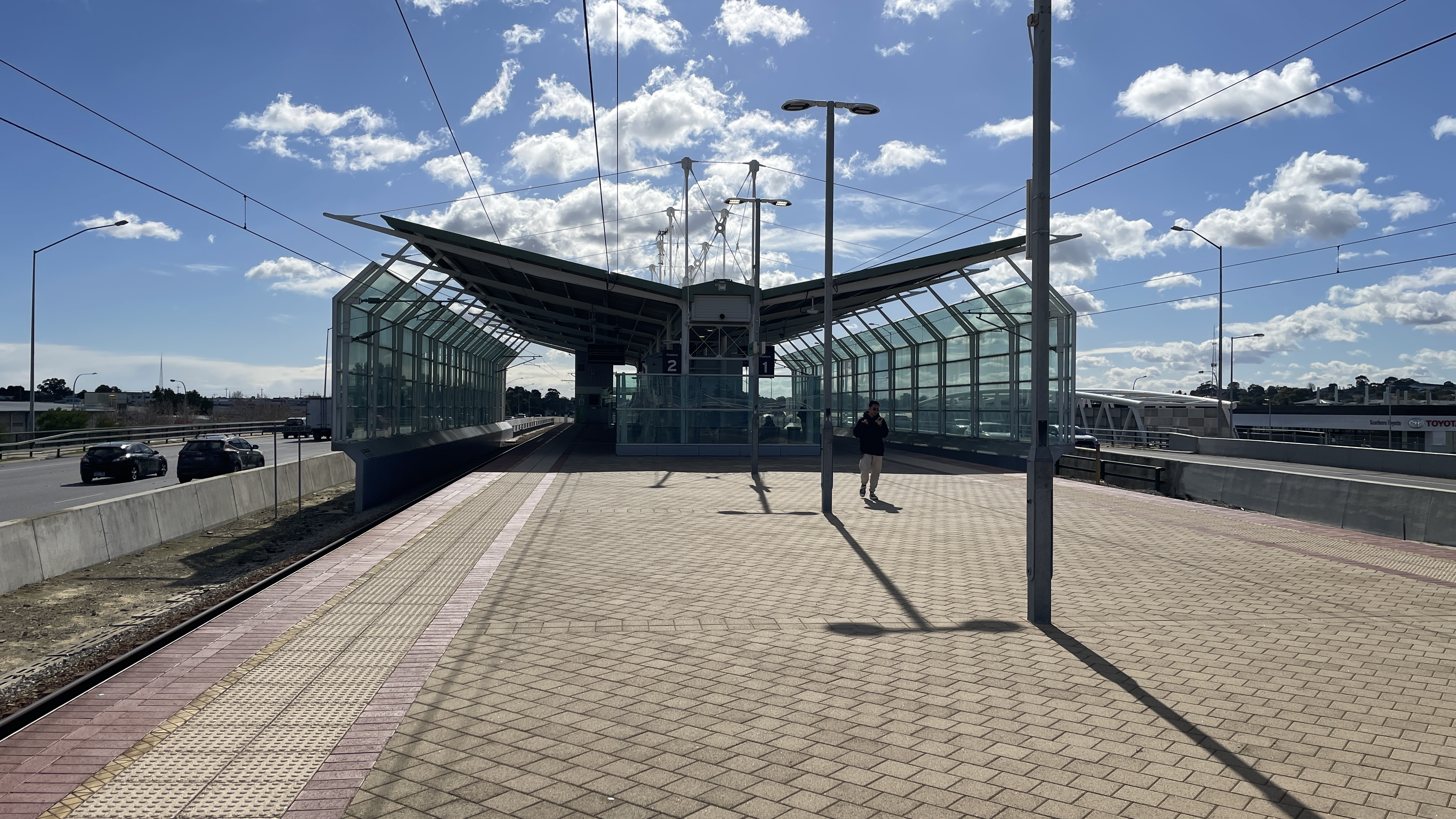

General information
- Location: Mitchell Freeway, Glendalough; Australia
- Coordinates: 31°54′53″S 115°49′23″E
- Owner: Public Transport Authority
- Operator: Transperth Trains
- Line: Yanchep line
- Distance: 5.0 km (3.1 mi) from Perth
- Platforms: 2 (1 island)
- Tracks: 2
- Bus routes: 8
- Bus stands: 9

Construction
- Structure type: Elevated
- Accessible: Yes

Other information
- Station code: JGH; 99811 (platform 1); 99812 (platform 2)
- Fare zone: 1

History
- Opened: 28 February 1993

Passengers
- March 2018: 2,800 per day

Services
Preceding station	Transperth	Following station
Leederville towards Elizabeth Quay via Perth Underground	Yanchep line All, K, W	Stirling towards Whitfords, Clarkson or Yanchep
Location
- Location of Glendalough railway station

Glendalough railway station is a railway station on the Transperth network in Perth, Western Australia. It is located on the Yanchep line, 5 kilometres (3 mi) from Perth Underground station serving the suburb of Glendalough.

== History ==
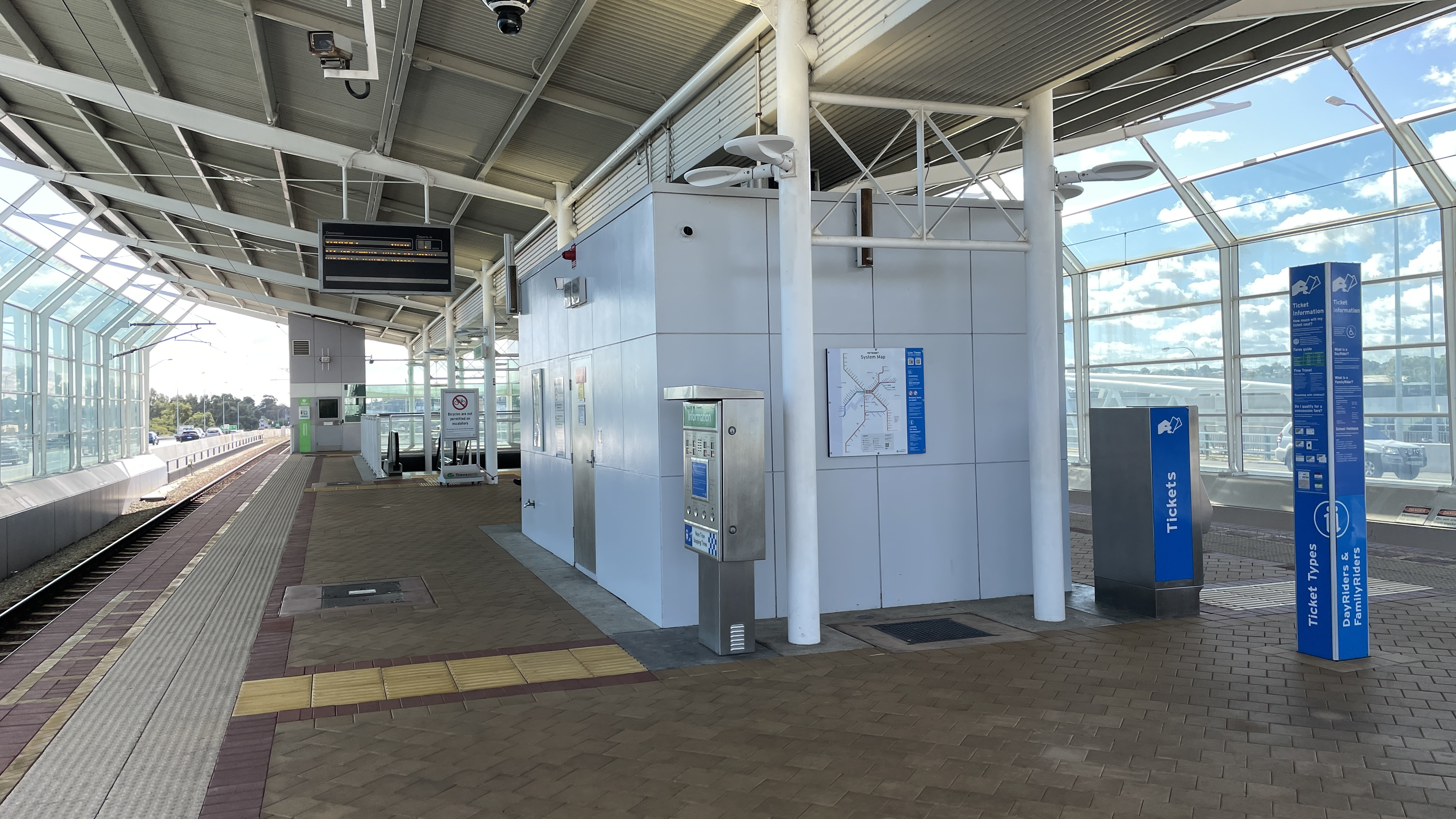
Covered area of the island platform

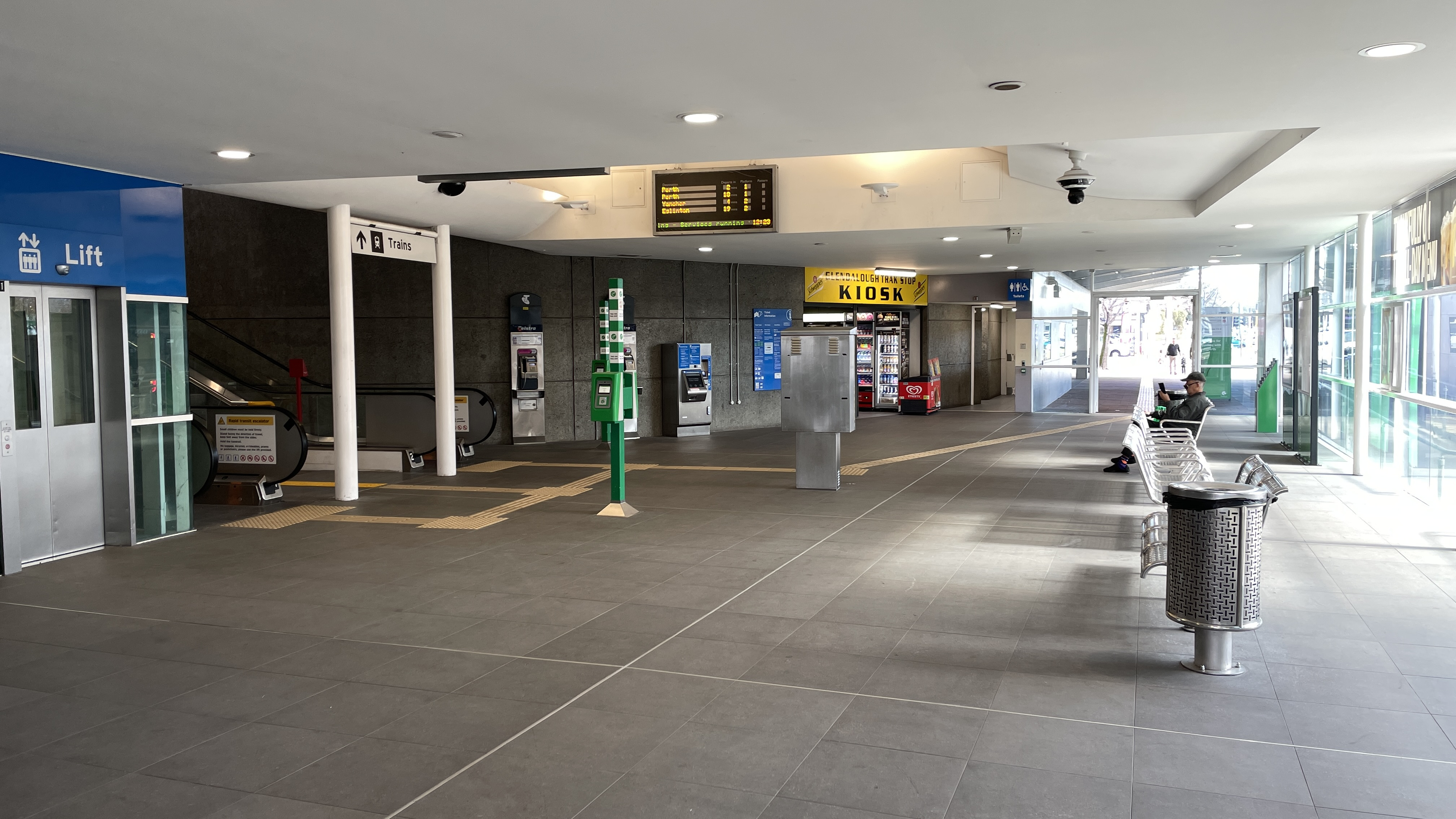
Station concourse

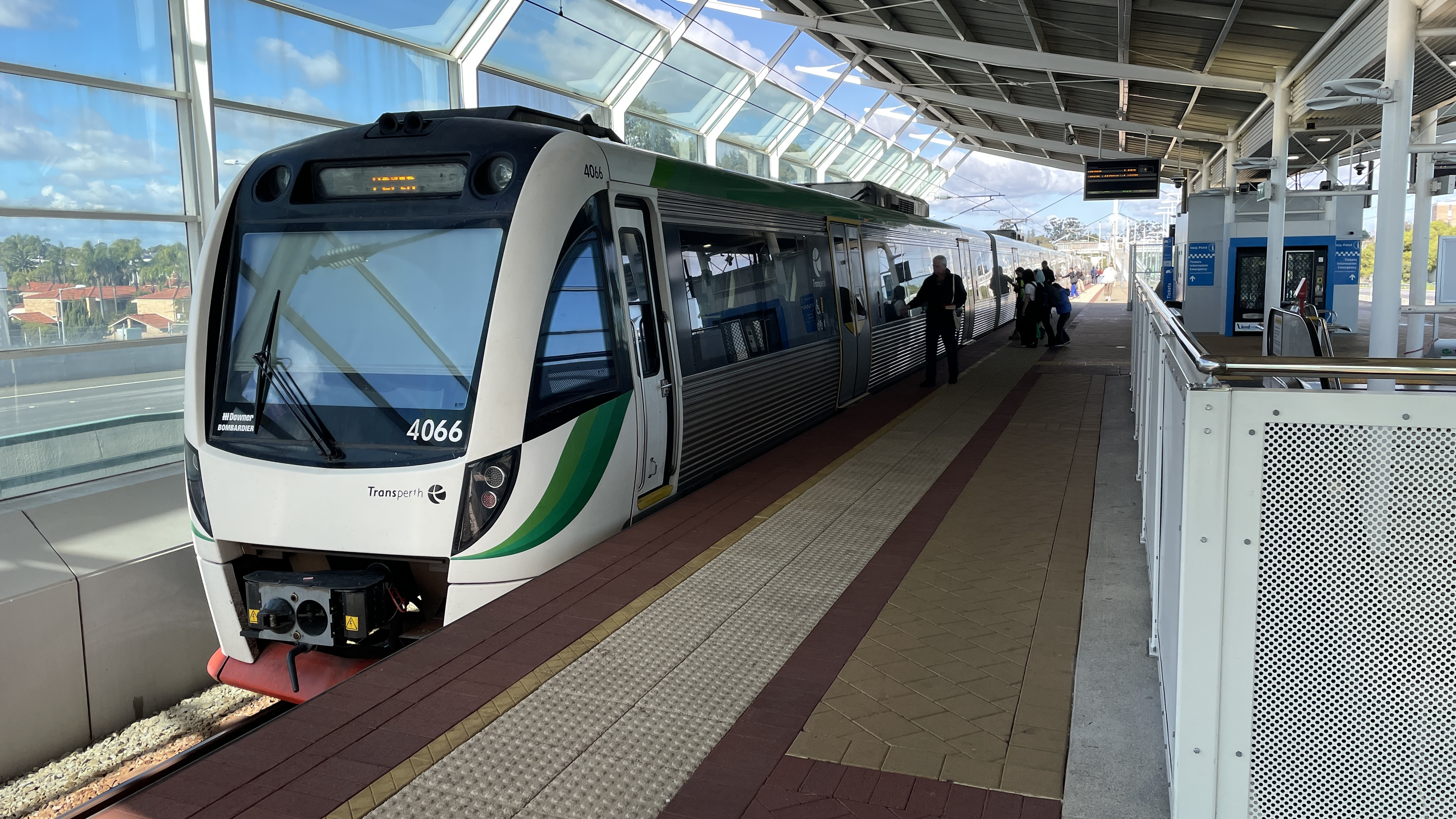
Transperth B-series train on Platform 1

Glendalough station was constructed by Sabemo Australia, a subsidiary of Transfield Constructions. The A$2.8 million contract, equivalent to A$5.95 million in 2022, was awarded to Transfield in March 1992. Construction was expected to begin in mid-May 1992 and be complete by December 1992.

Glendalough station opened on 28 February 1993 in the median strip of the Mitchell Freeway where it crosses over Scarborough Beach Road via a bridge.

In 2003, the contract for extending the platforms on seven Joondalup line (now Yanchep line) stations, including Glendalough station, was awarded to Lakis Constructions. The platforms on these stations had to be extended by 50 metres (160 ft) to accommodate 150-metre-long (490 ft) six-car trains, which were planned to enter service. Along with the extensions, the platform edges were upgraded to bring them into line with tactile paving standards. Work on this station was done in mid-2004.

In the mid-2000s, there was a push to rename the station to Scarborough Beach Road station, to better emphasize the buses that run along Scarborough Beach Road to the coastal suburb of Scarborough and its beach and entertainment precinct. The government requested public opinion on the possible name change, but eventually ruled it out in 2004, with acting Planning and Infrastructure Minister Tom Stephens saying "including Scarborough in the name of a station eight kilometres [5.0 mi] from the beach could also have caused confusion".

In September 2023, a trackless tram was delivered to the City of Stirling to begin trials for a proposed route between Glendalough railway station and Scarborough Beach.

== Services ==
Glendalough station is served by Transperth Yanchep line services.

Glendalough station saw 1,081,767 passengers in the 2013–14 financial year. In March 2018, Glendalough station had approximately 2,800 boardings on an average weekday.

== Platforms ==
Glendalough platform arrangement
Stop ID	Platform	Line	Service Pattern	Destination	Via	Notes
99811	1	Yanchep line	All stations, K, W	Elizabeth Quay	Perth Underground	
99812	2	Yanchep line	All stations	Yanchep		
99812	2	Yanchep line	K	Clarkson		
99812	2	Yanchep line	W	Whitfords		W pattern only during weekday peak times

== Bus routes ==
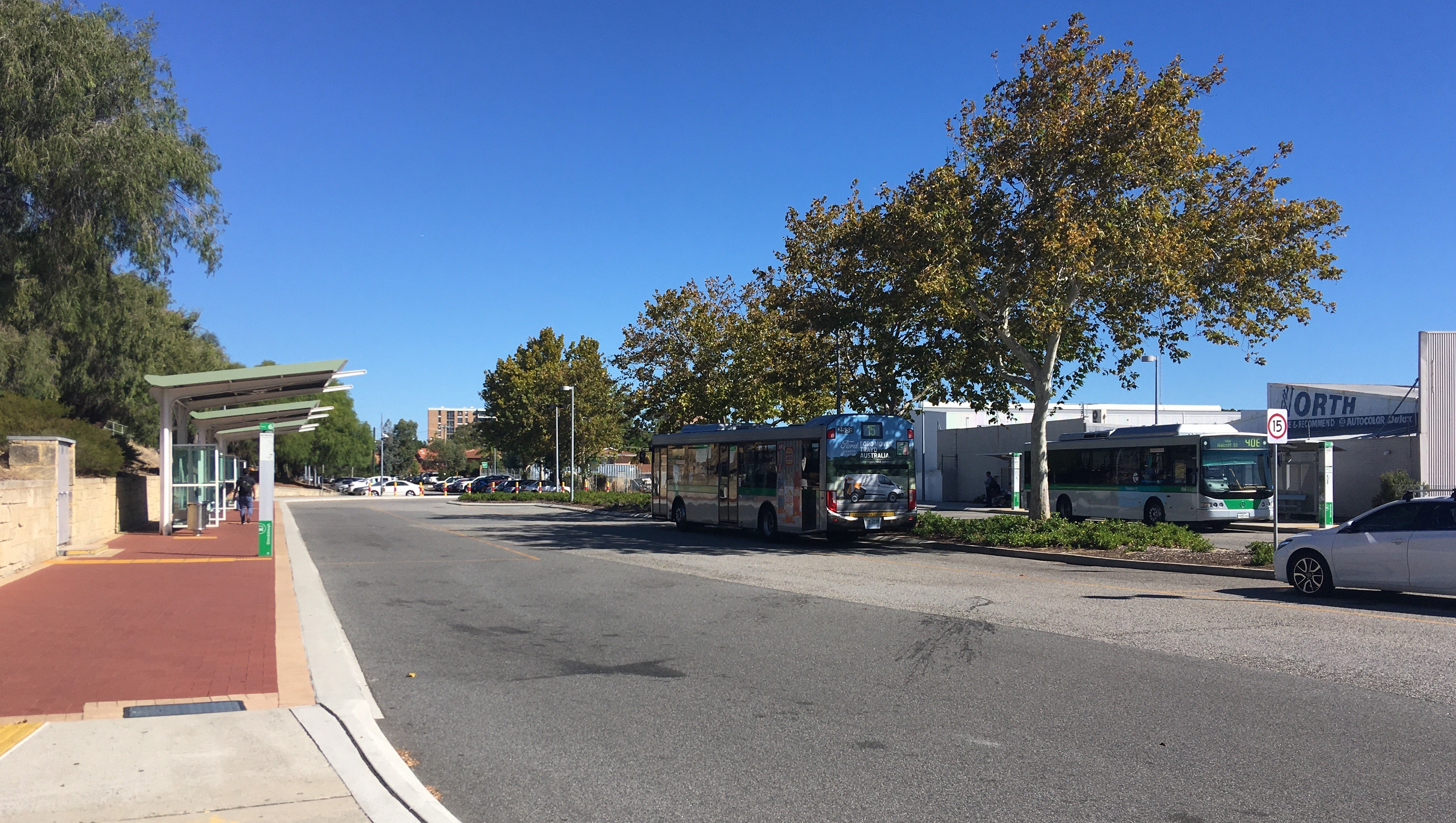
Glendalough station bus interchange, March 2021

Stop	Route	Destination / description	Notes
Stand 1	406	to Edith Cowan University Mount Lawley via Walcott Street	
Stand 2	85	to Perth Busport via Wembley	
Stand 2	95	to Bob Hawke College via Harborne Street and Subiaco Station	
Stand 2	413	to Stirling station via Osborne Park	
Stand 3	15	to Perth Busport via Mount Hawthorn & Oxford Street	
Stand 4	414	to Stirling station via Main Street & Balcatta	
Stand 5	990	to Perth Busport via Scarborough Beach Road	High frequency
Stand 5	904	Rail replacement service to Perth station	
Stand 6			Set down only
Stand 7	990	to Scarborough Beach bus station, Scarborough via Scarborough Beach Road	High frequency
Stand 8	904	Rail replacement service to Yanchep station	
Stand 8			School Specials
Stand 9	407	Osborne Park Circular via Walters Drive & Hasler Road	
