= International School of Western Australia =

School in Doubleview, Western Australia

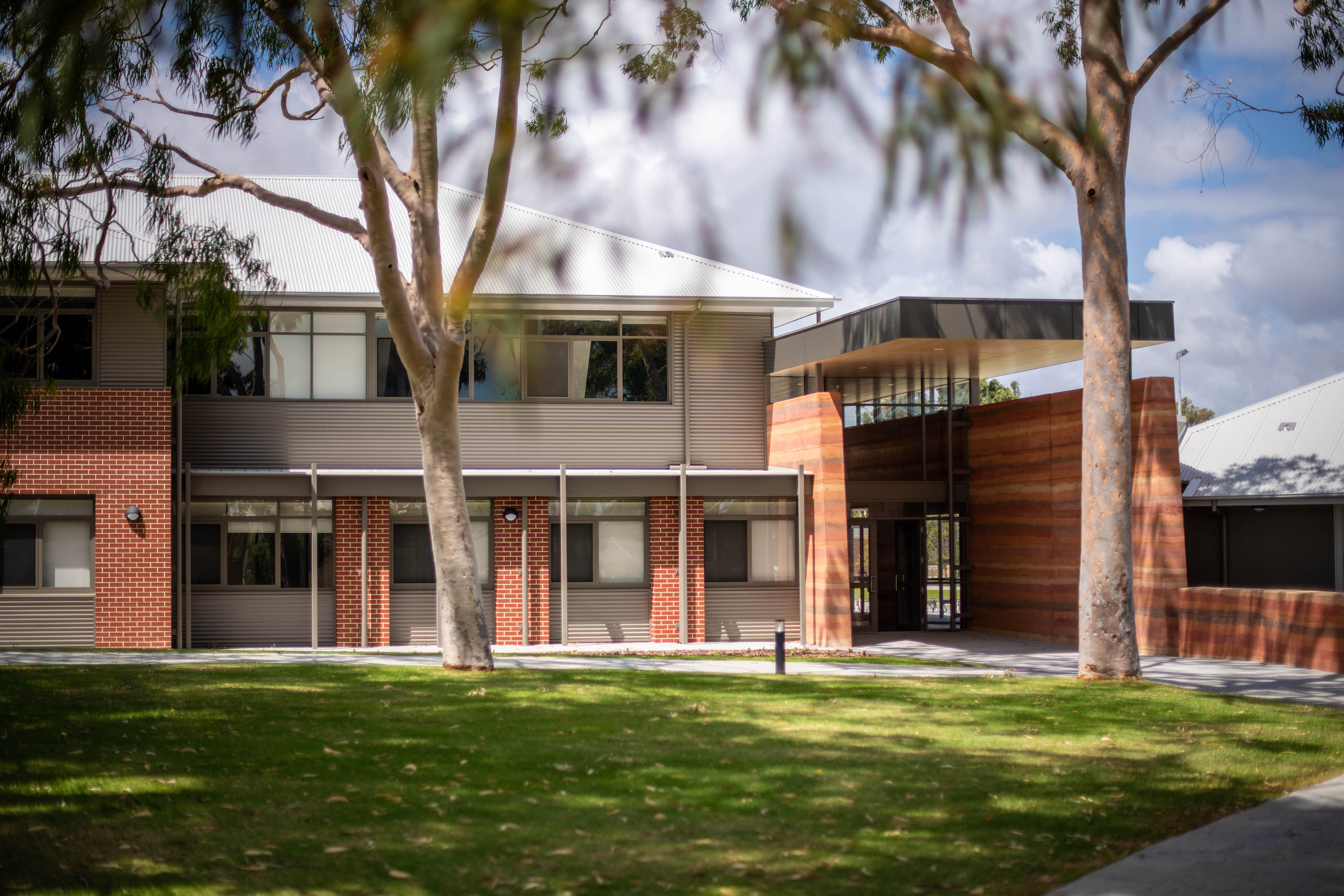
- Front view of the school's campus

Location
- 193 St Brigids Terrace, Doubleview, 6018 WA; Doubleview, Western Australia; Australia
- Coordinates: 31.897597°S 115.777751°E

Information
- Type: International school
- Established: 30 April 2008
- Principal: Caroline Brokvam
- Staff: 75
- Grades: K-12
- Enrollment: 403
- Language: English
- Website: www.iswa.wa.edu.au

The International School of Western Australia (ISWA) is a co-educational, non-denominational, independent international school in Doubleview, Western Australia. They offer education services to both local and international students from Kindergarten to Year 12.

ISWA follows the Western Australian curriculum through the International Baccalaureate (IB). The school offers both the IB Diploma Programme and the US College Board Advanced Placement to their senior students. Notably, ISWA does not offer the Western Australian Certificate of Education, and is the only school in Australia which offers Advanced Placement to its students.

ISWA offers an ICT Integration Program to its students, with a 1:1 notebook program from Grades 4–12 and access to devices from Grades K–3.

The academic calendar is largely based on the northern hemisphere calendar, with its school year starting mid to late July and ending in early June.
