= Scarborough Beach Road =

Road in Perth, Western Australia

Scarborough Beach Road Western Australia
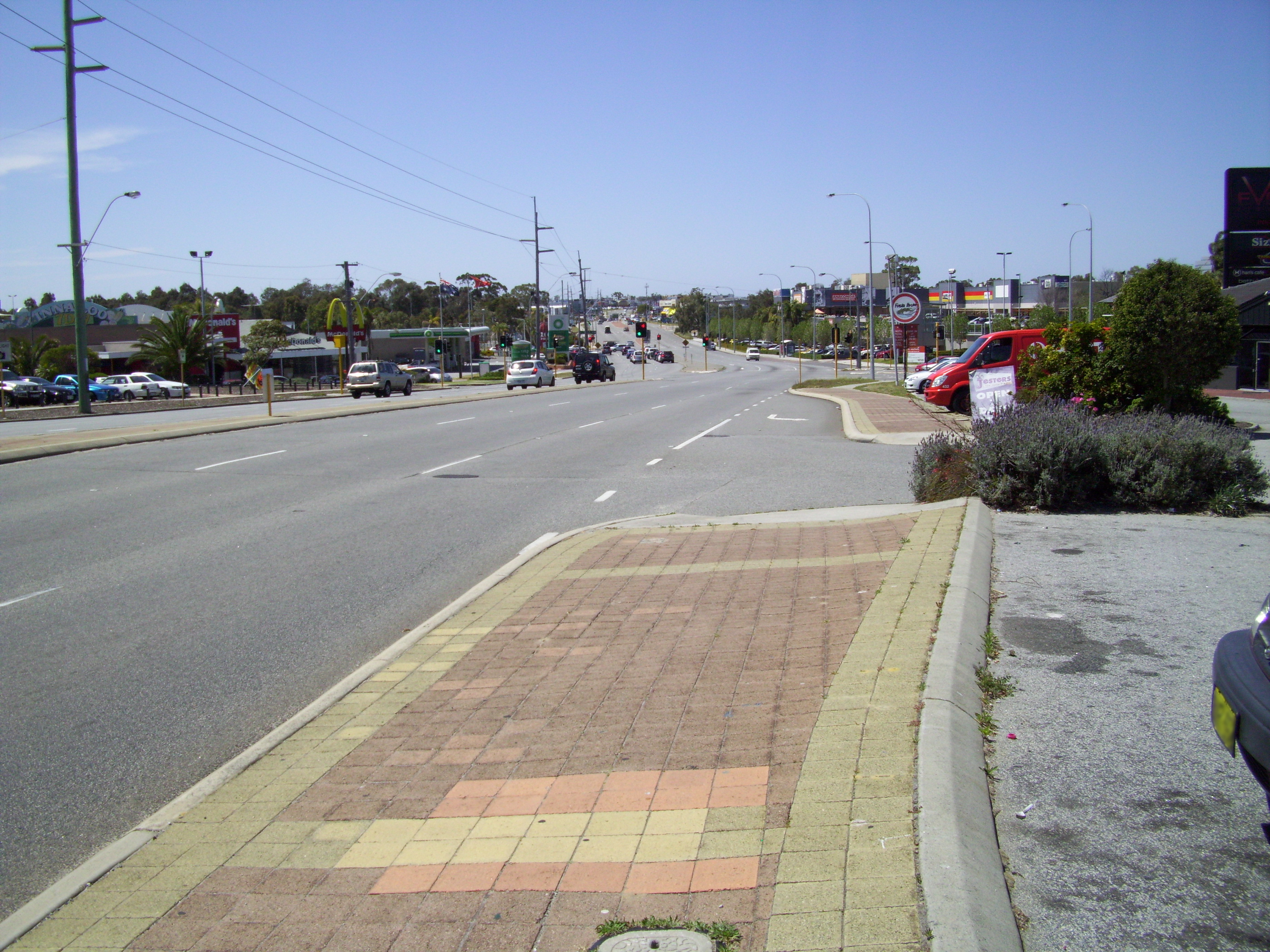
- Looking east, in Innaloo

General information
- Type: Road
- Length: 10.2 km (6.3 mi)
- Opened: 1910s
- Route number(s): State Route 75 (Osborne Park to Scarborough)
- Former route number: State Route 64 (Innaloo)

Major junctions
- Southeast end: Charles Street (State Route 60), North Perth
- Loftus Street (State Route 61); Green Street (State Route 75); Hutton Street; Stephenson Avenue (State Route 64); Odin Road
- Northwest end: West Coast Highway (State Route 71), Scarborough

Location(s)
- Major suburbs: Mount Hawthorn, Osborne Park, Innaloo, Doubleview

Scarborough Beach Road is an arterial northwest–southeast road located in the inner northern suburbs of Perth, Western Australia. It connects North Perth to Scarborough Beach, and is mostly a single carriageway road, with two or three lanes in each direction. The road is the western section of State Route 75, between Osborne Park and Scarborough, although a short section in Innaloo was also part of State Route 64 until December 2023.

== History ==
North Beach Road (the original road name) and was built to offer access to Osborne Park, which at the beginning of the 20th century was rural community with established agriculture including market gardens, pig farms, dairy farms, and poultry farms. Whilst it was a formed road from North Perth to the corner of Frobisher Road, there was only a sand track beyond this point to Njookenbooroo, now known as Innaloo. A plank road, completed in 1912, replaced this sand track, and "some years later", a limestone road extension to Brighton Road, near the coast, was built. By 1925 the road had been renamed as Scarborough Beach Road, and was classified as an arterial road by Mr. Arundale, the Perth Road Board engineer in 1925. By 1933, the plank roads in the area had been replaced by regular roads, but these roads were narrow and many accidents occurred due to increase in traffic associated with Scarborough Beach's rising popularity. The increasing traffic meant that the road was continually being upgraded, including a partial reconstruction by the Main Roads Department in 1938. In the 1950s, prior to the development of shopping centres at Karrinyup and Innaloo, the Mount Hawthorn section of the road was a popular shopping area.

== Route description ==
Scarborough Beach Road begins at Charles Street, in North Perth, as the continuation of Angove Street. The road travels north-west through Mount Hawthorn, which has been a shopping destination since the beginning of the 20th century. Axford Park, at the intersection of Oxford Street in Mount Hawthorn, is named in honour of World War I Victoria Cross recipient Thomas Axford. At Main Street, the road turns west and continues in this direction until Frobisher Street, along what was originally part of Green Street. The Glendalough railway station, built in 1992, picks up passengers on the road underneath the Mitchell Freeway bridge, in between Main Street and Frobisher Street. Scarborough Beach Road is one of only two arterial roads between Perth and Joondalup (along with Beach Road) that does not have an interchange with the Mitchell Freeway, although there was a "bus and taxi only" service road that was a southbound entrance ramp, it has since been converted to a PSP path Past here, the road continues north-west around Herdsman Lake, through the Osborne Park commercial centre to Innaloo. The Westfield Innaloo shopping centre, a large cinema and a tavern are located around the Odin Road/Liege Street/Ellen Stirling Boulevard intersections, which also carry traffic to the Mitchell Freeway, via Cedric Street. The Stirling railway station is located at that interchange. The road continues to travel north-west until Hancock Street, Doubleview, after which it heads west to Scarborough Beach. The last major intersection is with West Coast Highway, 100 metres (330 ft) east of its terminus.

== Intersections ==
LGA	Location	km	mi	Destinations	Notes
Vincent	North Perth	0	0.0	Angove Street / Charles Street (State Route 60) – Perth, Wanneroo	Traffic light intersection; Scarborough Beach Road continues east as Angove Street
Vincent	North Perth	0.18	0.11	Sydney Street	
Vincent	North Perth	0.25	0.16	Hardy Street	
Vincent	North Perth	0.35	0.22	Eton Street	
Vincent	North Perth	0.35	0.22	Pennant Street	
Vincent	North Perth	0.45	0.28	Anzac Road	
Vincent	North Perth	0.5	0.31	Auckland Street	
Vincent	North Perth–Mount Hawthorn border	0.65	0.40	London Street (State Route 61) / Loftus Street (State Route 61) – Nedlands, Joondanna	Traffic light intersection
Vincent	Mount Hawthorn	0.8	0.50	Harrow Street	
Vincent	Mount Hawthorn	0.85	0.53	Dunedin Street	
Vincent	Mount Hawthorn	0.95	0.59	Shakespeare Street	
Vincent	Mount Hawthorn	1.09	0.68	Faraday Street	
Vincent	Mount Hawthorn	1.12	0.70	Edinboro Street	
Vincent	Mount Hawthorn	1.19	0.74	Oxford Street	Traffic light intersection
Vincent	Mount Hawthorn	1.32	0.82	Fairfield Street	No right turns possible except Scarborough Beach Road eastbound onto Fairfield Street southbound
Vincent	Mount Hawthorn	1.45	0.90	Flinders Street	Traffic light intersection
Vincent	Mount Hawthorn	1.57	0.98	Coogee Street	
Vincent	Mount Hawthorn	1.69	1.05	Matlock Street	No through traffic on Matlock Street or right turns from Scarborough Beach Road onto Matlock Street
Vincent	Mount Hawthorn	1.75	1.09	Boobook Lane	
Vincent	Mount Hawthorn	1.82	1.13	The Boulevarde	
Vincent	Mount Hawthorn	1.85	1.15	Dover Street	
Vincent	Mount Hawthorn	2	1.2	Kalgoorlie Street	Kalgoorlie Street northbound to Scarborough Beach Road westbound only
Vincent	Mount Hawthorn	2.11	1.31	Killarney Street	Killarney Street westbound to Scarborough Beach Road only
Vincent	Mount Hawthorn	2.16	1.34	Buxton Street	
Vincent	Mount Hawthorn	2.22	1.38	Ellesmere Street	
Vincent	Mount Hawthorn	2.3	1.4	Egina Street	
Vincent	Mount Hawthorn	2.41	1.50	Federation Street	
Vincent	Mount Hawthorn	2.47	1.53	Merredin Street	
Vincent	Mount Hawthorn	2.55	1.58	Eucla Street	
Vincent	Mount Hawthorn	2.67	1.66	Birell Street	
Vincent–Stirling border	Joondanna–Mount Hawthorn–Osborne Park tripoint	2.7	1.7	Green Street (State Route 75) – Mount Lawley	Y junction; no right turn from Scarborough Beach Road westbound onto Green Street
Vincent–Stirling border	Osborne Park–Mount Hawthorn border	2.76	1.71	Main Street/Brady Street – Balcatta, Leederville	Traffic light intersection
Vincent–Stirling border	Osborne Park–Mount Hawthorn border	2.88	1.79	Donovan Street	
Vincent–Stirling border	Osborne Park–Mount Hawthorn border	3.01	1.87	Jugan Street	
Vincent–Stirling border	Osborne Park	3.24	2.01	Mitchell Freeway (State Route 2)	Southbound entry ramp only; no access except for buses and taxis
Stirling	Osborne Park	3.46	2.15	Harborne Street	
Stirling	Osborne Park	3.58	2.22	Harborne Street/Frobisher Street	Traffic light intersection
Stirling	Osborne Park	4.25	2.64	Drake Street	
Stirling	Osborne Park	4.56	2.83	Hutton Street – Tuart Hill	Traffic light intersection
Stirling	Osborne Park	4.86	3.02	Sundercombe Street	
Stirling	Osborne Park	5.13	3.19	O'Malley Street	
Stirling	Osborne Park	5.43	3.37	Selby Street North/King Edward Road	Traffic light intersection
Stirling	Osborne Park–Innaloo boundary	5.63	3.50	Stephenson Avenue (State Route 64) – Shenton Park, Stirling	Traffic light intersection
Stirling	Innaloo	5.82	3.62	Ellen Stirling Boulevard	Traffic light intersection
Stirling	Innaloo–Woodlands boundary	5.99	3.72	Liege Street	Traffic light intersection
Stirling	Innaloo	6.26	3.89	Ewen Street/Odin Road – Stirling	Traffic light intersection
Stirling	Innaloo	6.49	4.03	Wotan Street	Wotan Street onto Scarborough Beach Road only
Stirling	Innaloo–Woodlands boundary	6.52	4.05	Bowra Avenue	
Stirling	Innaloo–Woodlands boundary	6.65	4.13	Muriel Avenue	
Stirling	Innaloo–Woodlands boundary	6.77	4.21	Hazel Avenue	
Stirling	Innaloo–Woodlands boundary	6.89	4.28	Grant Avenue	
Stirling	Innaloo–Woodlands boundary	7	4.3	Mahlberg Avenue	
Stirling	Innaloo–Woodlands boundary	7.06	4.39	Knave Lane	
Stirling	Woodlands–Innaloo–Doubleview tripoint	7.16	4.45	Huntriss Road – Karrinyup	Traffic light intersection
Stirling	Doubleview	7.24	4.50	Sydenham Road	
Stirling	Doubleview	7.43	4.62	Princess Road	
Stirling	Doubleview	7.54	4.69	St Brigids Terrace	Traffic light intersection
Stirling	Doubleview	7.64	4.75	Woodside Street	
Stirling	Doubleview	7.79	4.84	Wilding Street	
Stirling	Doubleview	7.94	4.93	Beatrice Street	
Stirling	Doubleview	8.02	4.98	Hancock Street	
Stirling	Doubleview	8.13	5.05	Flamborough Street	
Stirling	Doubleview	8.24	5.12	Herbert Street	
Stirling	Doubleview	8.35	5.19	Grand Promenade	Traffic light intersection
Stirling	Scarborough	8.47	5.26	Gildercliffe Street	
Stirling	Scarborough	8.59	5.34	Westview Street	
Stirling	Scarborough	8.7	5.4	Northstead Street	
Stirling	Scarborough	8.82	5.48	Duke Street – Wembley Downs, Karrinyup	Traffic light intersection
Stirling	Scarborough	8.94	5.56	Burniston Street	
Stirling	Scarborough	9.05	5.62	Abbett Street	
Stirling	Scarborough	9.18	5.70	Deanmore Road	Scarborough Beach Road westbound to Deanmore Road southbound and Scarborough Beach Road eastbound to Deanmore Road northbound, only
Stirling	Scarborough	9.31	5.78	Hinderwell Street	
Stirling	Scarborough	9.45	5.87	Grace Street	
Stirling	Scarborough	9.52	5.92	Joyce Street	
Stirling	Scarborough	9.57	5.95	Westborough Street	
Stirling	Scarborough	9.66	6.00	Wheatcroft Street	
Stirling	Scarborough	9.7	6.0	Stanley Street	
Stirling	Scarborough	9.78	6.08	Alga Street	
Stirling	Scarborough	9.9	6.2	Edgehill Street	
Stirling	Scarborough	9.91	6.16	Hastings Street	
Stirling	Scarborough	10	6.2	Filburn Street	
Stirling	Scarborough	10.1	6.3	West Coast Highway (State Route 71 / Tourist Drive 204) – City Beach, Fremantle, Ocean Reef	Traffic light intersection
Stirling	Scarborough	10.2	6.3	The Esplanade	Roundabout
1.000 mi = 1.609 km; 1.000 km = 0.621 mi: Concurrency terminus; Incomplete access
