= List of State Register of Heritage Places in the Town of Cambridge =

The State Register of Heritage Places is maintained by the Heritage Council of Western Australia. As of 2026, 136 places are heritage-listed in the Town of Cambridge, of which 15 are on the State Register of Heritage Places.

== List ==
The Western Australian State Register of Heritage Places, as of 2026, lists the following 15 state registered places within the Town of Cambridge:

Place name	Place #	Street number	Street name	Suburb or town	Co-ordinates	Notes & former names	Photo
Leederville Town Hall & Recreation Complex	2195	82-84	Cambridge Street	West Leederville	31.940517°S 115.836635°E		
West Leederville Primary School	2208	58	Northwood Street	West Leederville	31.939118°S 115.832701°E		
Catherine McAuley Centre	2231	18	Barrett Street	Wembley	31.939314°S 115.823228°E	New Subiaco, Benedictine Monastery, St Vincents, Orphanage & Foundling Home, St Joseph's Orph	
Model Brick Home	8894	6	The Boulevard	Floreat	31.9390°S 115.8036°E		
Model Timber Home	8895	12	The Boulevard	Floreat	31.9387°S 115.8031°E		
Quarry Amphitheatre, City Beach	9102	145	Oceanic Drive	City Beach	31.9395°S 115.7775°E		
City Beach and Floreat Beach Precinct	9108		Challenger Parade, between Oceanic Drive and The Boulevard	City Beach	31.9344°S 115.7554°E	City Beach, Groyne and Lookout Tower	
Holy Spirit Catholic Church, City Beach	13020	2	Keaney Place	City Beach	31.916735°S 115.764847°E		
Iwanoff House, Floreat	17608	16	Lifford Road	Floreat	31.933863°S 115.782745°E	House and studio of Iwan Iwanoff	
Benedictine Stables (former)	23680	18	Barrett Street	Wembley	31.938386°S 115.822567°E	Old Benedictine Monastery (part of early development of the site), Stables - Catherine McAuley Centre	
St Vincent's Foundlings Home	23830	18	Barrett Street	Wembley	31.938331°S 115.823822°E		
Olive Trees, Barrett Street	23834	18	Barrett Street	Wembley	31.938623°S 115.823124°E	Olea europaea	
Leederville War Memorial and Rose Garden	23872	78-80	Cambridge Street	West Leederville	31.940508°S 115.836956°E		
South City Beach Kiosk	26251		Challenger Parade	City Beach	31.9398°S 115.7549°E	Part of the City Beach and Floreat Beach Precinct (9108)	
Bob Hawke's House (former)	26464	101	Tate Street	West Leederville	31.9373°S 115.8285°E	Childhood home of Australia's 23rd Prime Minister, Bob Hawke	
