= List of Brutalist buildings in Perth =

This page is a list of historically significant brutalist buildings in the Perth, Western Australia metropolitan area.

Following rapid population growth after World War II and various mining booms in the 1950s and 1960s, there was a need for the rapid, inexpensive expansion of public infrastructure in the city. Coupled with material shortages, this led to the construction of many brutalist buildings by the Public Works Department and other parties.

Name	Address	Date	Architect	Image	Notes
Alexander Library Building (State Library of Western Australia)	25 Francis Street, Perth	1985	Cameron Chisholm Nicol	AUS Perth, Central Business District, State Library of Western Australia 001	
Architecture and Planning Building, Curtin University	105 Kent Street, Bentley	1969	Vin Davies	Curtin building 201 looking along S from near 213	
Art Gallery of Western Australia	Perth Cultural Centre, Perth	1977	Charles Sierakowski	The Art Gallery of Western Australia, Perth, 2023, 26	State Heritage Register 1962
Christian Science Sunday School	264 St Georges Terrace, Perth			First Church of Christ, Scientist, Perth, January 2025 05	
Commonwealth Bank Building	150 St Georges Terrace, Perth				
South City Beach Kiosk	Challenger Parade, City Beach	1970	Tony Brand and Paul Ritter (Forbes & Fitzhardinge)	South City Beach Kiosk, May 2023 06	State Heritage Register 26251
Don Aitken Centre (Main Roads Western Australia)	132 Plain Street, East Perth	1970	Oldham, Boas, Ednie-Brown & Partners	Main Roads Building (Don Aitken Centre), East Perth, December 2022 03	State Heritage Register 26494
FESA House	480 Hay Street, East Perth	1976			Demolished in 2014
Marsala House	38 Sycamore Rise, Dianella	1976	Iwan Iwanoff	Marsala House 2017	State Heritage Register 09917
Memorial Hall, Hale School	160 Hale Road, Wembley Downs	1961	Marshall Clifton and Anthony Brand		Considered to be the first brutalist building built in Australia
Perth Concert Hall	5 St Georges Terrace, Perth	1973	Howlett & Bailey	Iwelam, Perth Concert Hall south front	State Heritage Register 4571
Public Transport Centre	116 West Parade, East Perth	1976	Forbes & Fitzhardinge	East Perth transport centre b0	
Reid Library, University of Western Australia	35 Stirling Highway, Crawley	1964	Cameron Chisholm Nicol	AUS Perth, Central Business District, University of Western Australia 0109	
Royal Perth Hospital, North Block	Wellington Street, North Perth	1988		Royal perth hosp 01 gnangarra	
TL Robertson Library, Curtin University	105 Kent Street, Bentley	1972	Hames Sharley and Schmidt Hammer Lassen	Curtin T.L. Robertson Library (2005)	

== See also ==
- Brutalist architecture
- List of Brutalist structures
