= Raymond Jones (architect) =

Australian architect (1925–2022)

Raymond Alfredo Daniel Jones (18 July 1925 – 22 September 2022) was an Australian Modernist architect. His work includes many building types, including residential, ecclesiastical, educational, commercial, and prefabricated kit buildings.

Like his mentor Robin Boyd, Jones continued to experiment with ideas of space and environmental design. His architectural works promote passive environmental systems, and has become a leader in the implementation of sustainable design practices in Western Australia.

== History ==
Raymond Jones was born in Geelong, Victoria, Australia on 18 July 1925.

From 1943 to 1945, Jones joined the Royal Australian Navy, and was aboard the cruiser HMAS Australia during the Philippines Campaign.

In 1946, Jones began his architectural studies at the University of Melbourne, and was taught by Robin Boyd, Roy Grounds, John Mockridge, and Frederick Romberg. He took a particular interest in the works of Boyd, particularly in relation to Boyd's ideas of spatial continuity between building and landscape, as well as his environmental design philosophy.

Upon completion of his architectural degree in 1951, Jones worked for Melbourne architectural firm, Yuncken, Freeman Brothers, Griffiths & Simpson (now known as Yuncken Freeman). At the same time, he became part of the design team that won a competition to design an Olympic stadium in Carlton, Victoria, as well as housing for the new town of Eildon, Victoria, which had been constructed to support the construction of Lake Eildon.

During his studies, Jones played Australian rules football for Collingwood and Melbourne from 1946 to 1949. In 1953, he later played in a premiership with the South Fremantle Football Club.

Jones moved to Western Australia in 1953 and began his own practice in Perth. During the 1950s he had an increased number of staff, ranging from young architects and students, which included; Wallace Greenham, Walter Hunter, Robert Hart, Ken Yewers, and Michael Patroni.

From 1966 to 1967, Jones practiced in partnership with Montague Grant, going by the name "Jones Grant Architects".

His first significant architectural project was his own residence, the 'Jones House', in Haining Avenue, Cottesloe, where Jones heavily referenced the architectural teachings of Boyd. Jones begins to experiment with space and structure in responding to the environment, through passive ventilation, northern glazing and thermal massing.

Jones was also noted for his many ecclesiastical projects, and completed a total of six churches for the Catholic Church. All of his churches were inspired by cave-like catacombs, a common metaphor he used in the design of communal spaces. The Church of St Cecilia, in Kenmore Crescent Floreat, referenced this cave-like metaphor, and departed from the typical cruciform plan. Instead, St. Cecilia's pentagonal form was based on a total of ten planes (five walls planes and five roof planes), which symbolised the Ten Commandments and the sacrifice of Jesus Christ.

Jones' educational projects, particularly his work at Preschool Centre in Stirling Highway, North Fremantle; New Day Nursery in High Street/Parry Street, Fremantle; and 'Winterfold Primary School', in Annie Street, Hamilton Hill, were designed to enable variable use, through the use of large internal and external centralised spaces.

This relationship between space and environmental design culminates in his development of the Tetrakit system. Working in the cyclonic areas of north-western Australia in the aftermath of Cyclone Tracy in 1974, Jones with the help of structural engineer George Katieva, devised prefabricated kit homes. Constructed of prefabricated frames and panels, the Tetrakit kit home would resist the strong wind pressures during a cyclone. Roofs and walls inclined at 15 degrees balanced the cyclonic winds loads placed on the building.

== Contribution ==
His interests and passions in ecological design continued, particularly through the use of skillion roofing and courtyard spaces, as well as passive ventilation and site orientation, as environmental design strategies. Jones was also attributed to the innovative use of concrete raft slabs and swimming pools to suburban housing, in controlling interior temperatures. Climate also began to inform Jones' approach to architecture, experimenting with how architecture was best suited to its particular site and environment.

== Thoughts on architecture ==
Jones was a lifelong critic of active heating and cooling systems, particularly mechanical air conditioning, and always strived to create buildings which rely on more passive systems. He states that, "We ought to legislate that there is no air-conditioning in new homes and that a building license should only be issued if they build along renewable energy principles. You can do it well without building expensively".

Jones was not impressed by a lot of modern architecture in Perth, saying he's depressed by the "proliferation of ugliness". "We are just not going forward at all, we are going backward". He blames Perth's ugly, impractical and unsustainable modern homes on the laziness and expediency of politicians, city planners and mass-marketed project homes. Jones said he was a crusader for sensible, environmentally aware design.

Jones was still practicing as an architect as of 2011 and had no interest in quitting, instead focusing on projects of interest.

== Notable projects ==
- 1952: Leonard House Glen Road, Malvern, Victoria
- 1952: RR Jones House Park Road, Park Orchards, Victoria
- 1953: Melbourne Olympic Stadium (Competition Entry), Yuncken, Freeman Brothers, Griffiths and Simpson (now known as Yuncken Freeman)
- 1953: Jones House, Haining Avenue, Cottesloe, Western Australia
- 1953: Williams Flats, Broome Street, Cottesloe, Western Australia
- 1954: Ruse Flats, Kanimbla Road/Karella Street, Nedlands, Western Australia
- 1954: O'Mahony House, Haining Avenue, Cottesloe, Western Australia
- 1955: Preschool Centre and Community Hall, Stirling Hwy, North Fremantle, Western Australia
- 1955: Boxhorn House, Shannon Street/Roscommon Road, Floreat, Western Australia
- 1956: McMillan House, Allenby Road, Dalkeith, Western Australia
- 1956: Powell House, Chester Street/Lloyd Street, South Fremantle, Western Australia
- 1956: Kiernan House, Allenby Road, Dalkeith, Western Australia
- 1957: Silbert House, Barcoo Avenue/Doonan Road, Nedlands, Western Australia
- 1957: Ash House, Hammersley Street, Trigg, Western Australia
- 1958: Gerrard House, Page Street, Attadale, Western Australia
- 1959: Freedman House, Alyth Road, Floreat, Western Australia
- 1959: Staff Club UWA (Competition Entry), The University of Western Australia
- 1960: Church of St Cecilia, Kenmore Crescent, Floreat, Western Australia
- 1961: N&S Hubbard House, Nairn Rd, Applecross, Western Australia
- 1962: Church of St Peter, Wood Street, Bedford, Western Australia
- 1962: Lysaght Offices, Norma Road/McCoy Street, Myaree, Western Australia
- 1962: Mingenew Court House, Moore Street/William Street, Mingenew, Western Australia
- 1963: Rankine-Wilson House, The Boulevard, Floreat, Western Australia
- 1963: V&B Hubbard House, Oceanic Drive, Floreat, Western Australia
- 1964: Lisle House, Pindari Road, City Beach, Western Australia
- 1964: WWF Point Peron Camp, Point Peron
- 1964: Our Lady of Lourdes Memorial Church, Flinders Street, Nollamara, Western Australia
- 1965: 'New Day Nursery, High Street/Parry Street, Fremantle, Western Australia
- 1966: Carbon Duplex, Point Walter Road/ Beach Street, Bicton, Western Australia
- 1968: CIL Offices, Clontarf Road, Hamilton Hill, Western Australia
- 1969: Premier Motors, Elder Street/ Hay Street, Perth, Western Australia
- 1970: Winterfold Primary School, Annie Street, Hamilton Hill, Western Australia
- 1971: Raymond Jones House, Ainslie Road, North Fremantle, Western Australia
- 1972: Commonwealth Bank Cannington, Albany Highway, Cannington, Western Australia
- 1974: Edwards House, Lobelia Drive/ Dryandra Crescent, Greenmount, Western Australia
- 1976: Nulungu Chapel, Broome, Western Australia
- 1976: Christian Community Village, Buckland Road, Jarradale
- 1979: Parliament House (Competition Entry), Canberra, ACT
- 1980: Majestic Hotel (Competition Entry), Fraser Road, Applecross, Western Australia
- 1981: Summers House, Brand Highway (near Eneabba, Western Australia)
- 1981: Webse House, Jarradale Road, Jarradale
- 1984: RAC Albany, Albany Hwy, Albany, Western Australia
- 1988: Clunies Ross House, Brindal Close, Bicton, Western Australia
- 1988/9: Tetrakit
- 1990: Brodwyn Graham House, Edina Court, Two Rocks, Western Australia
- 1991: Cann & Hicks House, Sapho Place, Two Rocks, Western Australia
- 1992: Desmond Sands Duplex, Haining Avenue, Cottesloe, Western Australia
- 2008: Tschaplin Jones House, Pensioner Guard Road, North Fremantle, Western Australia
