= Quarry Amphitheatre =

Heritage listed concert venue in City Beach, Western Australia

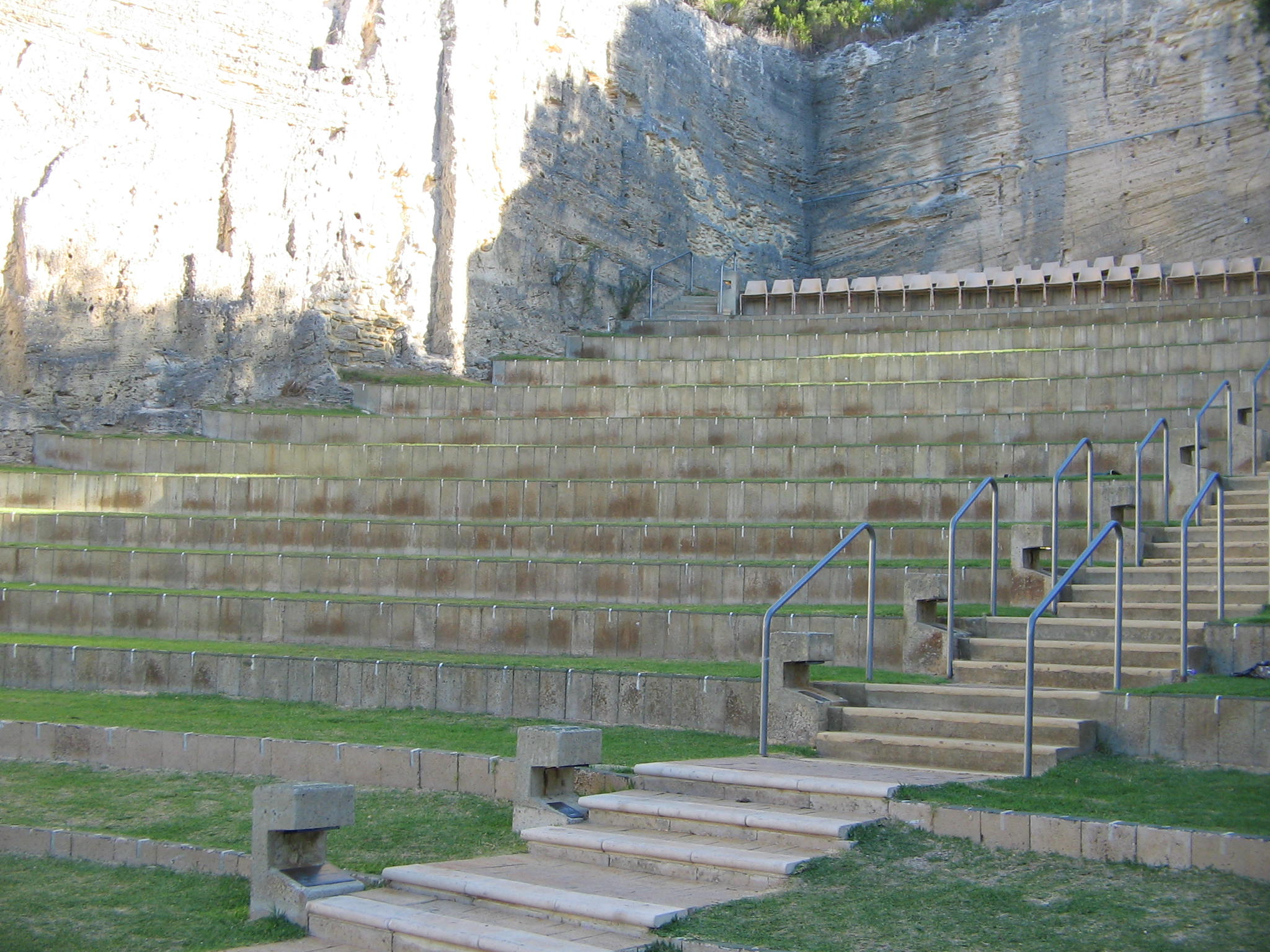
- Quarry Amphitheatre
- Interactive map of Quarry Amphitheatre
- Address: Reabold Hill, Oceanic Drive; Floreat; Australia
- Location: Perth, Western Australia
- Coordinates: 31°56′22″S 115°46′39″E
- Owner: Town of Cambridge
- Operator: Town of Cambridge
- Capacity: 566
- Type: Heritage listed amphitheatre

Construction
- Opened: November 9, 1986; 39 years ago

Website
- www.quarryamphitheatre.com.au

Western Australia Heritage Register
- Type: State Registered Place
- Designated: 13 August 2019
- Reference no.: 9102

The Quarry Amphitheatre is an outdoor venue located close to the ocean in City Beach, Western Australia. It has a 19 by 13.5 m (62 by 44 ft) sprung wooden stage and changing facilities for around 80 performers. It was officially opened on 9 November 1986 and is owned and operated by the Town of Cambridge.

The amphitheatre is located in an old limestone quarry, first quarried in 1834 by Henry Trigg. The limestone from the quarry was used for construction and lime-burning. In 1847 Trigg sold the landholdings to Walter Padbury, who continued the quarrying operations. At the height of the limestone kiln operations, more than 50 men worked at the site. The land was then sold to brothers Henry and Somers Birch in 1869, and then on to Joseph Perry in 1879. Perry kept the quarry and lime kilns working, with the last lime kiln being built in 1897. The quarrying ceased in 1906. In 1917 the land was sold to the Perth City Council.

The concept of converting the quarry into an amphitheatre was conceived by Diana Waldron, the director of the Perth City Ballet Company, in the early 1980s. With funding support from the Commonwealth Government, Lotteries Commission and the former City of Perth, the vision finally became a reality and the Quarry Amphitheatre was officially opened on 9 November 1986. It is set in natural bushland and supports a capacity audience of 566. It is a licensed BYO facility. The venue is used extensively between October and May for a range of events from ballet to concerts and large weddings.

== See also ==
- List of contemporary amphitheaters
