= Floreat Forum =

Shopping centre in Perth, Western Australia

Floreat Forum Shopping Centre
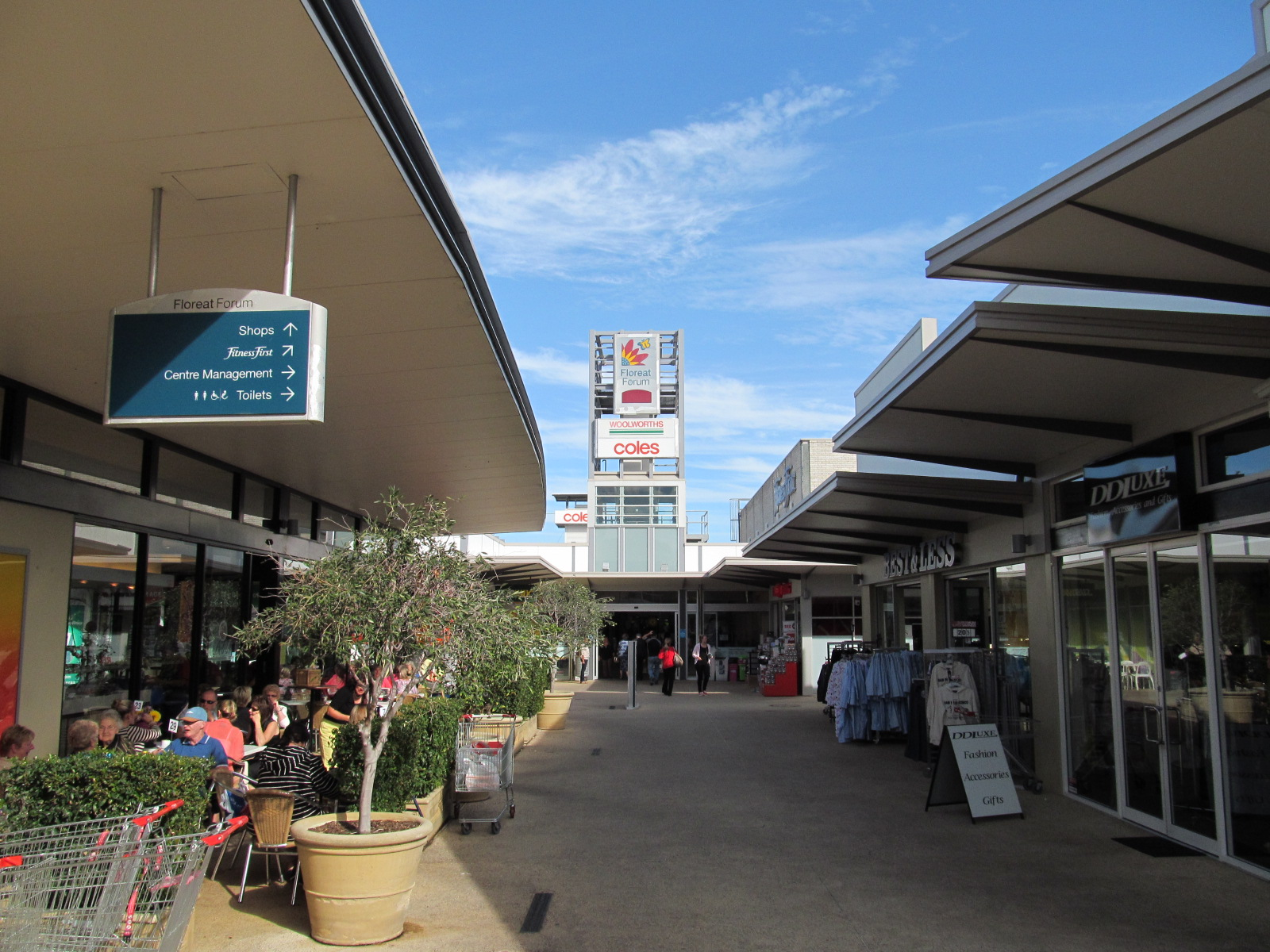
- The shopping centre in 2012
- Location: Floreat, Western Australia, Australia
- Coordinates: 31.9379603°S 115.7928931°E
- Opened: 20 September 1965; 61 years ago
- Developer: Hammerson Group
- Owner: Apil Group
- Architect: Cameron Chisholm Nicol
- Num. of stores: 80
- Num. of anchor tenants: 2
- Floor area: 19,077 m^{2} (205,340 sq ft)
- Floors: 2 (plus 1 basement floor for parking)
- Parking: ~900 bays
- Website: https://www.floreatforum.com.au/

Floreat Forum is a shopping centre in Floreat, a suburb west of Perth. It is located on Howtree Place, between Oceanic Drive to the south, and The Boulevard to the north. It was opened in 1965, being Perth's first "American-style" shopping centre.

The forum uses a shopping mall layout, with the anchor stores Coles and Woolworths supermarkets located along the central indoor walkway, along with other stores. The centre contains the Town of Cambridge library and municipal offices as well as an outdoor dining precinct.

== History ==
With the expansion of the Floreat Park subdivision and sale of resident allotments including in the surrounding suburbs during the 1950s and 1960s, compounded by the 1962 British Empire and Commonwealth Games at nearby Perry Lakes Stadium, the City of Perth saw the need for a shopping centre as a priority and preliminary plans were prepared for a shopping centre and movie theatre.

The forum was design by the Cameron Chisholm Nicol architecture firm, and originally consisted of three main buildings:

- Department store, food shops, chain store, furniture
- Community centre
- Specialty shops

Construction of Floreat Forum began in 1963, by the Hammerson Group, and lasted until 1965; it was officially opened on 20 September 1965 by Premier David Brand.

On opening of the shopping centre, the majority of stores lined a central open-air walkway. It was anchored by a Woolworths Food Fair and Moores Department Store, among some of the forty stores. There was a library, community centre and playground.

=== 1981 mock invasion ===
In 1981, the Floreat Forum was used as a site for a mock invasion by the 5 A Res Recruiting unit of the Australian Army. The show contained various displays, including the workings of a 105mm howitzer and Light Horsemen showing a 2.5 ton truck and Land Rover. Army cooks prepared food on field equipment and medics exhibited their training and had an ambulance open for inspection. Larger demonstrations where conducted with Soldiers from the Special Air Service Regiment parachuting from 2,000 metres and infantrymen rappelling down from a helicopter above the centre.

=== 1984 tent roof ===
In 1984, a tent roof made of Sheerfill fabric, resembling a three pointed circus tent, was erected over the central walkway allowing natural light into the walkway but protecting customers from the weather. This was the first roof of its kind to be built in Australia.

In 1992 the forum was sold for A$24.5 million

=== 2002 redevelopment ===
The 2002 redevelopment was the largest the site has seen, with the centre's distinctive roof structure being removed and only part of one of the 1965 car parks surviving. Several other parts of the centre were also remodelled or moved, including:

- A new outdoor dining precinct, with a small playground
- A new library
- The reconstruction of the western car park into a two level, multi-story car park
- The demolition of the two existing petrol stations, which were replaced by a single station next to the new library at the northern end of the centre
- Expansion of the southern car park

In 2009, the centre was purchased for a stated A$100 million, by the Apil Group.

== Transport ==
The centre is served directly by four bus routes operated by Swan Transit. Providing access to surrounding suburbs and Perth's central business district, as well as connections to the Fremantle line and Yanchep line.
