= Schmidt-Lademann House =

Residence in Floreat, Western Australia designed by Iwan Iwanoff

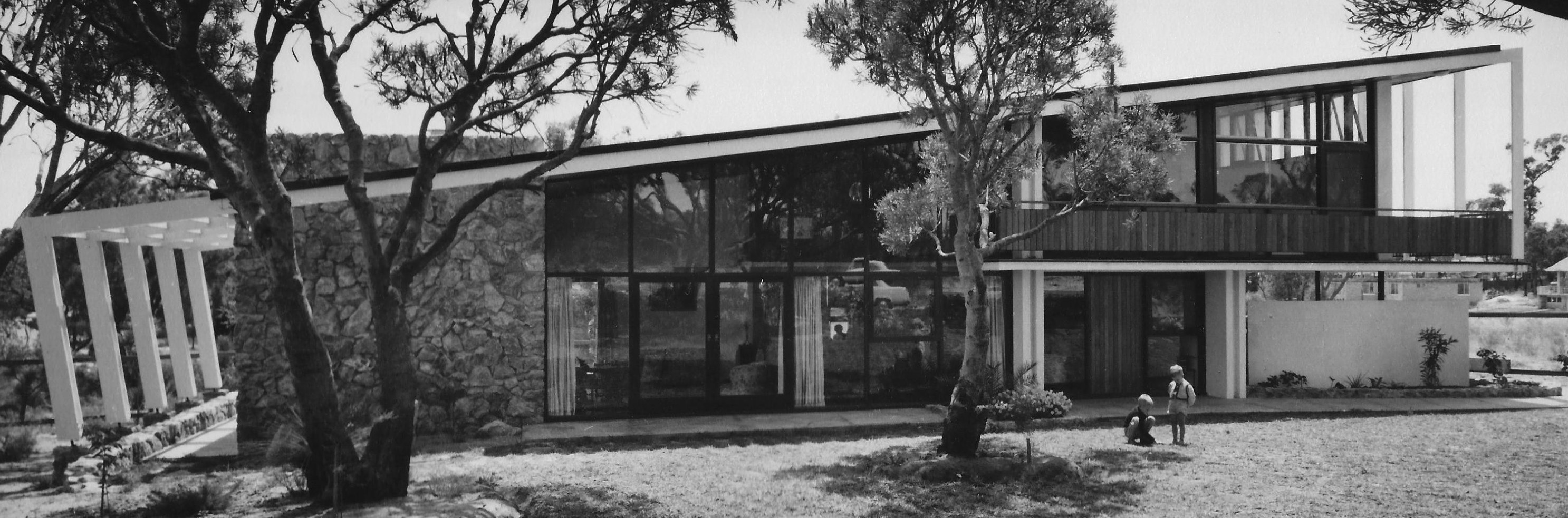
- 1959
- Interactive map of the Schmidt-Lademann House area

General information
- Type: Residence
- Architectural style: Modernist
- Location: 22 Lifford Road, Floreat, Western Australia, Australia
- Coordinates: 31.9342°S 115.7815°E
- Completed: 1958; 68 years ago

Technical details
- Grounds: 906 m^{2} (9,750 sq ft)

Design and construction
- Architect: Iwan Iwanoff

The Schmidt-Lademann House (Note: In various publications such as the Town of Cambridge Inventory of Heritage Places and internet websites the house is referred to by the name of the builder and first owner Siegfried and Jutta Schmidt-Lademann.) is a residential dwelling built 1958 in Floreat, a suburb of Perth, Western Australia. It is designed by Bulgarian-born architect Iwan Iwanoff and is an iconic example of mid-century modern architecture in Australia.

== Design ==
Siegfried Schmidt-Lademann became consul in Perth for Germany in 1957. He decided to build a residence for the consul in Perth which would be suitable for private living and for formal receptions. The house was the first independent design by the architect Iwan Iwanoff and was built in 1958. It became one of Iwanoff's notable projects.

In 1959 the German consulate in Perth was closed and the house had to be sold.

In contrast to the later more ornamented and playful designs of Iwanoff with some resemblance to Brutalist architecture, the light and clear design of this house is inspired by the Modernist architecture and Bauhaus ideas which Iwanoff was introduced to during his studies and work with Emil Freymuth in Munich, Germany. Characteristic features of this partially single storey, partially double storey house are apart from the distinctive soaring skillion roof line the blending of natural materials granite, timber, copper. It features jarrah ceilings, blackbutt (Note: Blackbutt is a common name for wood from several species of Eucalyptus, and it is unclear which this one is.) parquetry floors, wandoo staircase, maple cupboards, Corian benchtops, granite feature walls, a copper-surrounded fireplace. The jarrah framed window front on the south side opened a wide view on the Roscommon Reserve directly opposite. Overall the house shows Iwanoff's tendency to complex composition and with the wall at the southwest corner built from granite boulders Iwanoff already hints his interest in massive structures. The granite wall extends into the interior as a fireplace in the living area and a barbecue pit on the terrace in the west.

Floor plan 1958

The design of 1958 included a living area on two levels separated by 2 steps into a dining area at the lower level and a sitting area with fireplace on the higher level, 3 bedrooms, a study on the gallery, a kitchen and 1.5 bathrooms.

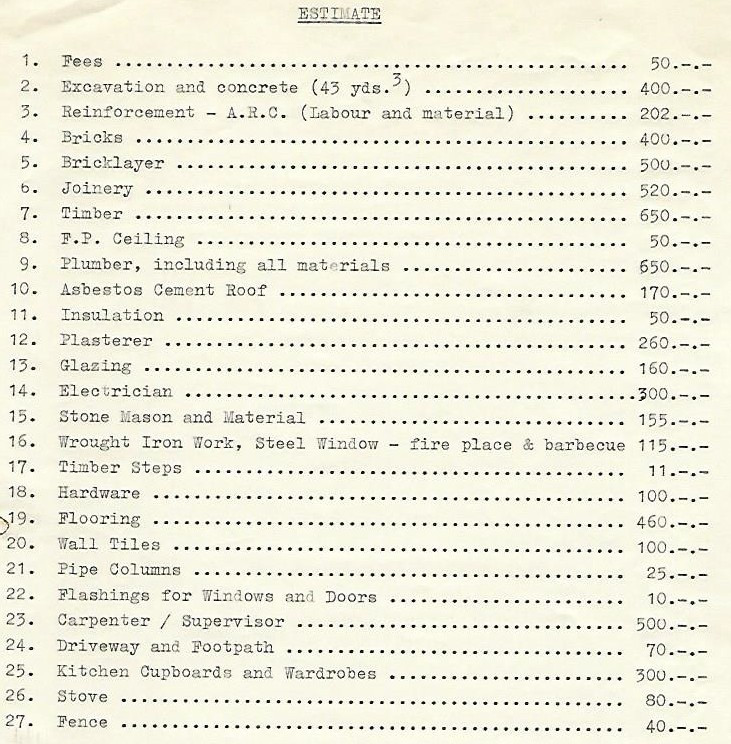
Original T&M estimate from 1958. The total of £6328 (Australian pound) equates to approximately 235,500 AUD purchasing power in 2023.

== History ==
After to the original architecture rather insensitive renovations and extensions in the 1970s the house became unoccupied. 1998 Justin Locke purchased the house, did a thorough renovation and in 2001 through 2003 added an extension filling out the previous "L" shape on the northwest side with a two-storey block adding an indoor/outdoor dining area on the ground floor and a bedroom and bathroom on the upper floor. This addition merges very well with the original design especially where it repeats the slanted roof with the external post and beam structure on the eastern end of the home.

The residence is listed in the Town of Cambridge Local Government Inventory of Heritage Places as place no. 39.

It has changed ownership several times and increased in value each time:

Value Development
Purchase Date	Cost ($)
June 1989	255,000
February 1998	440,000
June 2012	2,300,000

== Gallery ==
Exterior, south side, 1959 vs. 2017 showing how the 2003 extension merges with the original design

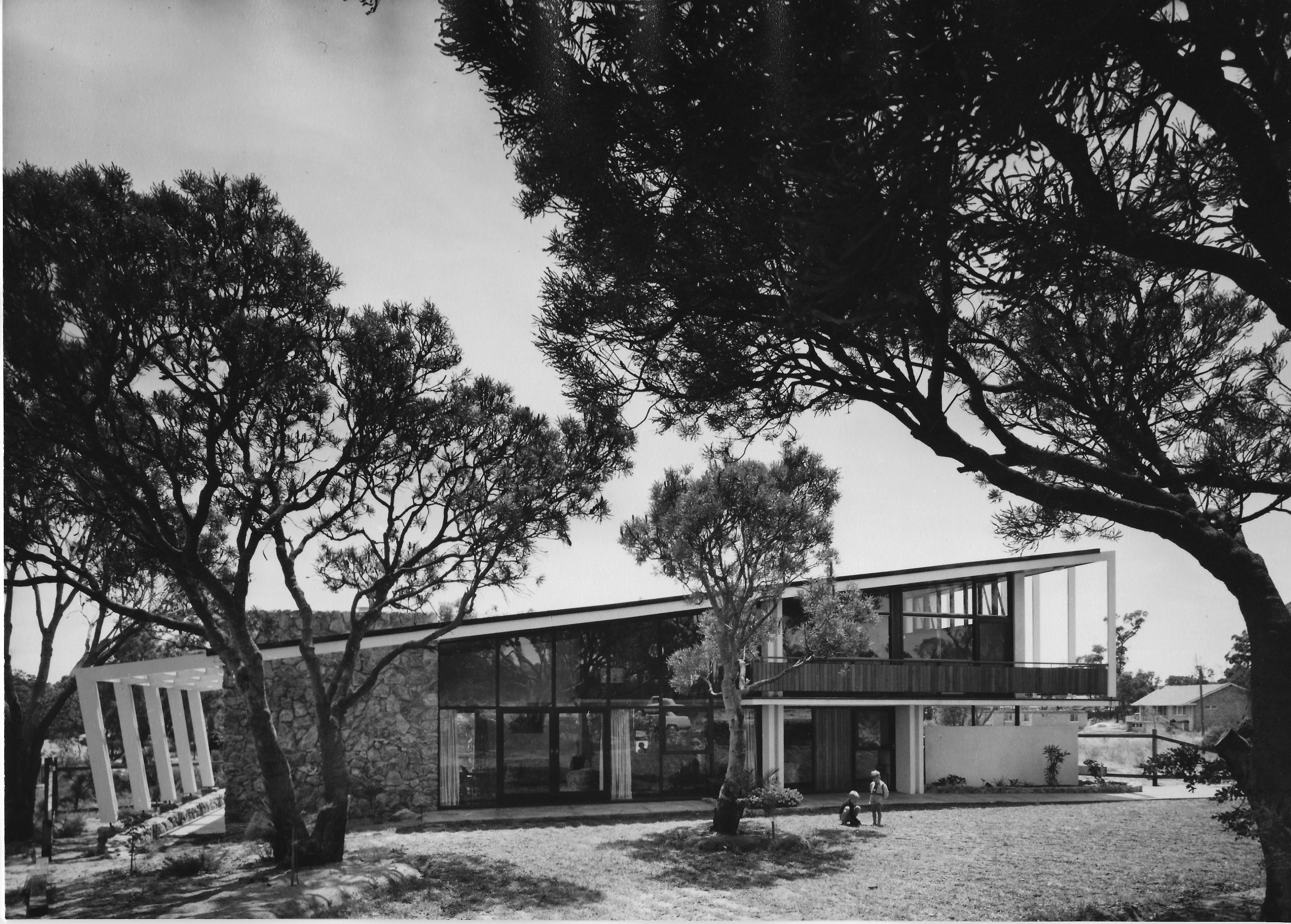
1959

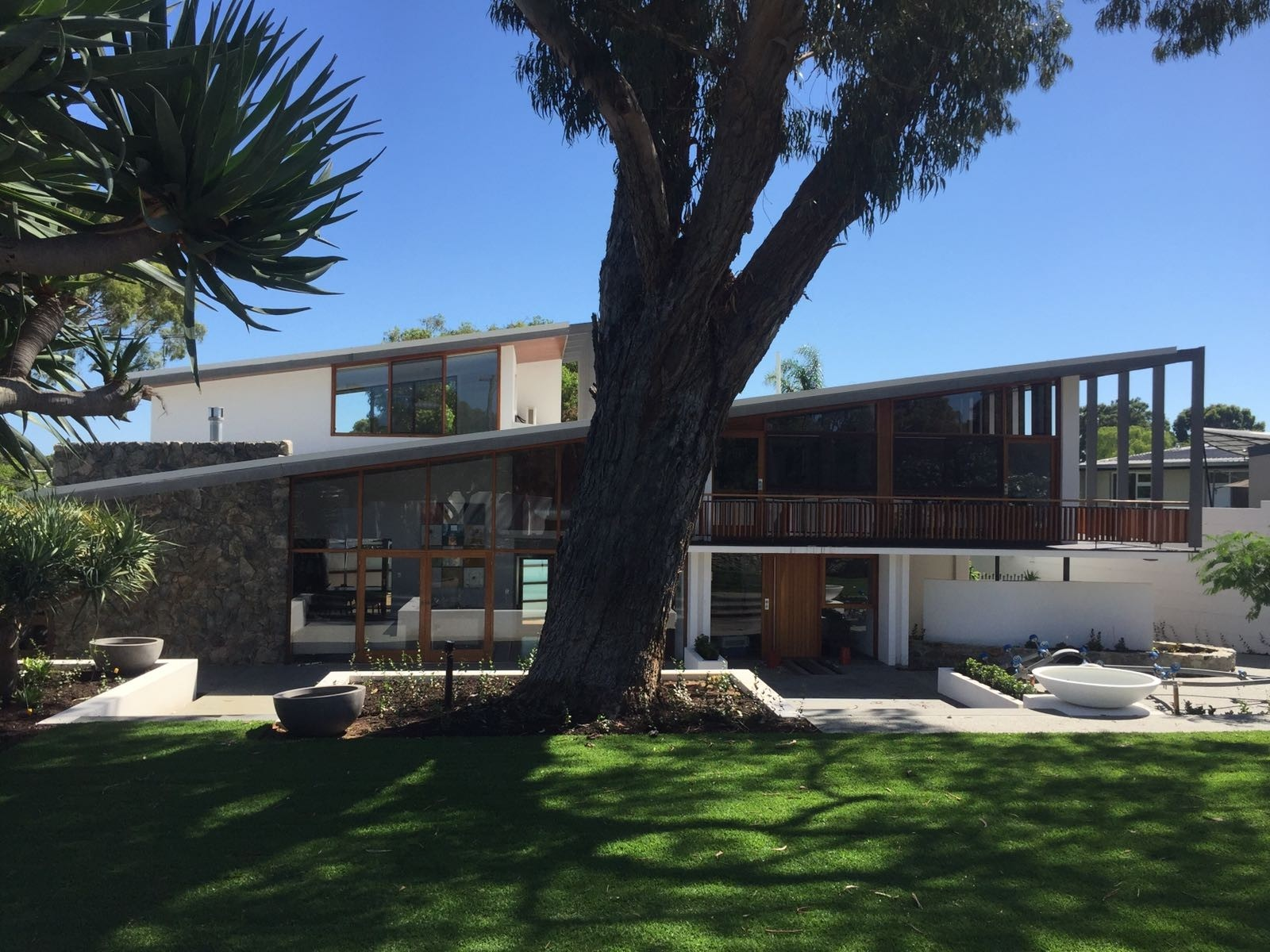
2017

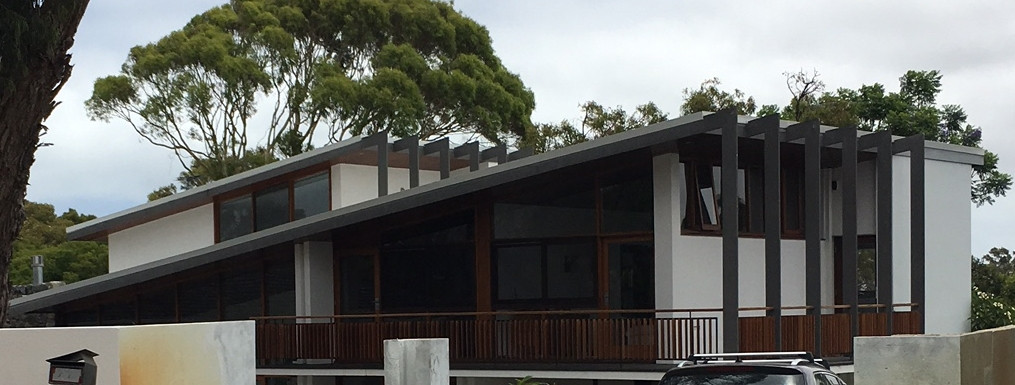
2017
Interior

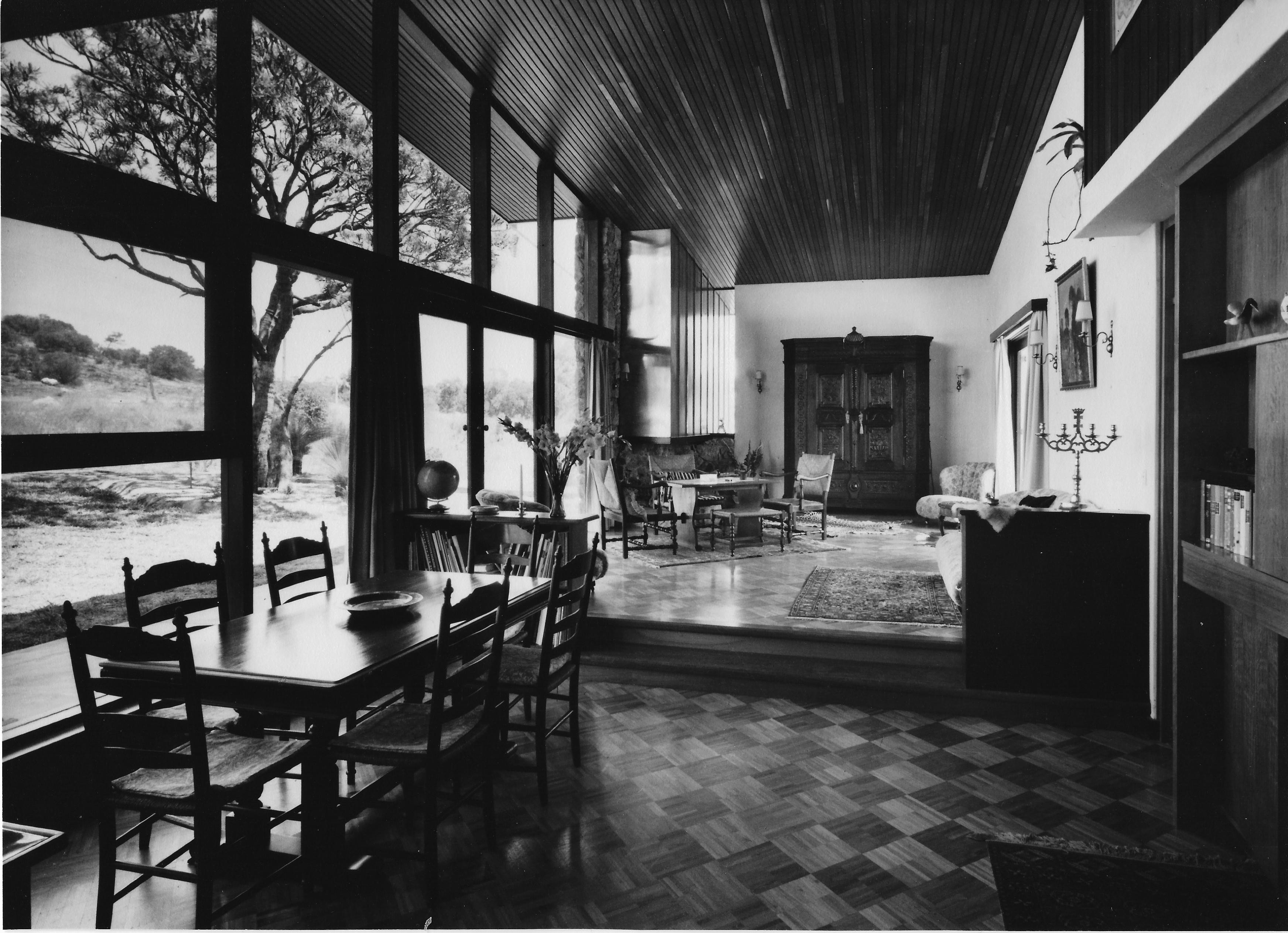
1959 living area

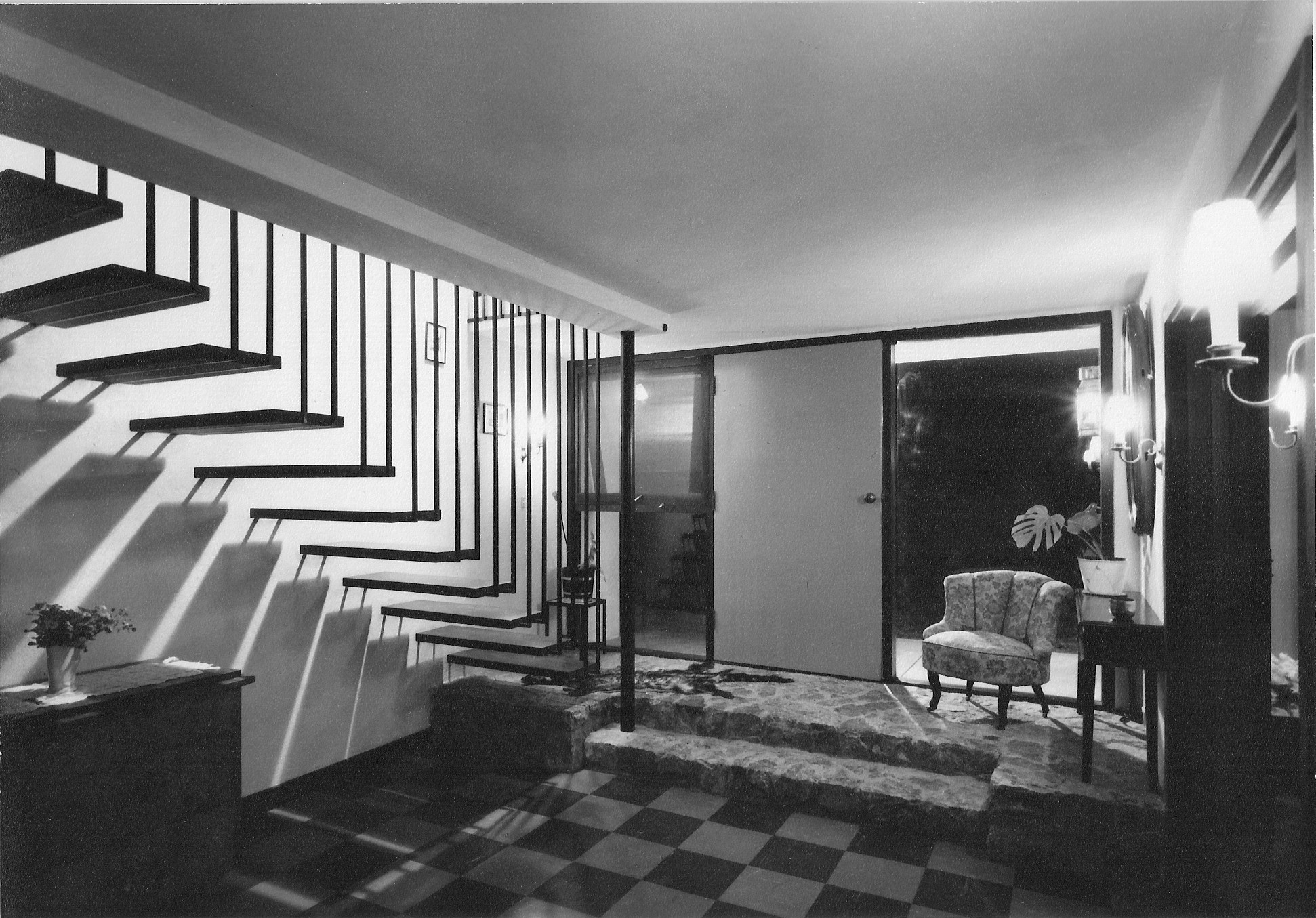
1959 entrance hall in typical Bauhaus style
