= The Boulevard, Perth =

Road in Perth, Western Australia

The Boulevard Western Australia
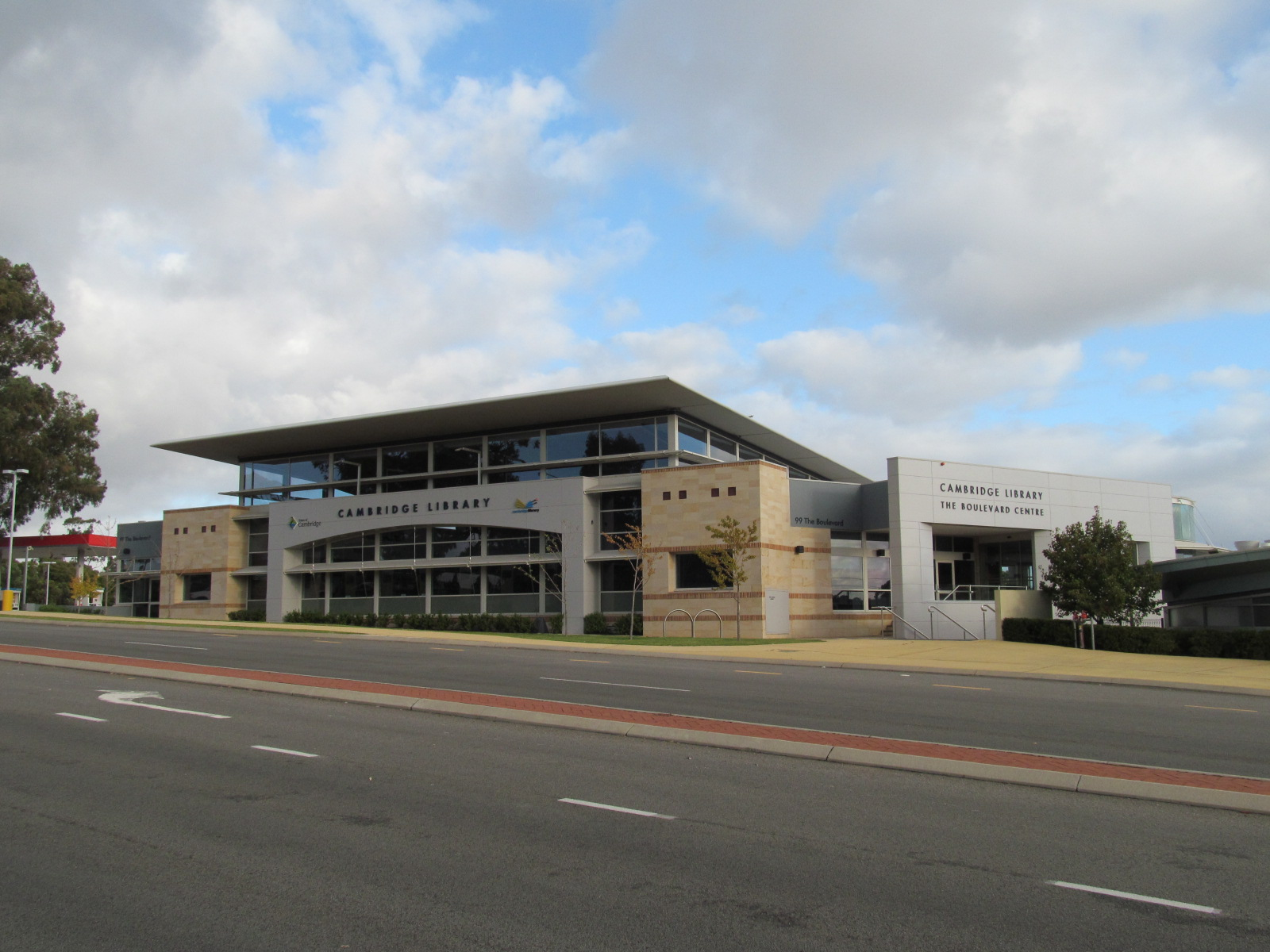
- Cambridge Library, with The Boulevard in the foreground

General information
- Type: Road
- Length: 5 km (3.1 mi)
- Opened: 23 November 1928
- Maintained by: Town of Cambridge
- Route number(s): State Route 72 (Grantham Street – West Coast Highway)

Major junctions
- East end: Cambridge Street
- Selby Street (State Route 64); Howtree Place; Grantham Street (State Route 72); Empire Avenue; Bold Park Drive; Durston Road
- West end: West Coast Highway (State Route 71 / Tourist Drive 204)

Location(s)
- Major suburbs: Wembley, Floreat, Wembley Downs, City Beach

The Boulevard is a 5-kilometre (3.1 mi) distributor road in the western suburbs of Perth, Western Australia, linking the inner western suburb of Wembley to City Beach on the west coast. The section of The Boulevard west of Floreat is the westernmost section of State Route 72, which continues east as Grantham Street to Wembley and beyond. Along its route are intersections with several major roads, including Selby Street and Grantham Street. The eastern terminus of The Boulevard is at Cambridge Street and the western terminus is at West Coast Highway.

Planning for The Boulevard began in the 1920s, and construction occurred between December 1927 and November 1928. Widening occurred between 1939 and 1941.

== Route description ==
The Boulevard is the westernmost section of State Route 72. It commences at an intersection with Cambridge Street, Wembley, travelling west, and terminates at an intersection with West Coast Highway, City Beach. Route access is uncontrolled and the speed limit is 60 kilometres per hour (35 mph). The road is predominantly single-lane dual carriageway with a combination of painted and paved medians, with additional lanes near major intersections.

Main Roads Western Australia monitors traffic volume across the state's road network, including many locations along The Boulevard. The busiest section is near the centre between Grantham Street and Empire Avenue, which averaged over 18,000 vehicles per weekday in 2003/04, 20,000 in 2005/06, and 18,000 in 2007/08. The volume generally declines on either side of the road, with the fewest vehicles recorded near the western end. Near the western West Coast Highway terminus were fewer than 7,000 vehicles per weekday in 2003/04, 8,000 in 2005/06, and 9,000 in 2007/08. Near the eastern Cambridge Street terminus were fewer than 8,000 vehicles per weekday in 2003/04, 9,000 in 2005/06, and 9,000 in 2007/08.

=== Wembley ===
The Boulevard begins at an uncontrolled Y junction, branching from Cambridge Street and proceeding northwest for 850 metres (2,790 ft). Just northwest of Cambridge Street, it begins as a single-lane dual carriageway with paved median, with a brief interruption in the median for a right-turn pocket at the T-junction with Keane Street.

The first major intersection is with Selby Street. The Boulevard splits into three lanes on each side of the approach to the signalised intersection, including one dedicated right turn lane on each side, while retaining a single lane for all outbound traffic. Northwest of the intersection, a painted median is predominantly used to separate the carriageways, though occasional islands of paved median occur.

=== Floreat ===
Many minor unsignalised intersections and T-junctions occur with residential streets as The Boulevard continues northwest and then proceeds west for 500 metres (1,600 ft). West of one such T-junction with Floreat Avenue, The Boulevard becomes a two-lane dual carriageway with a paved median, with additional right-turn pockets at various locations.

After The Boulevard resumes a northwesterly direction for 750 metres (2,460 ft) after the Kirkdale Avenue intersection, the next major intersection is with Howtree Place. The Boulevard splits into three lanes on each side of the approach to the signalised T-junction (an additional right-turn lane eastbound and an additional left-turn slip lane westbound) while retaining two lanes on each carriageway for all outbound traffic.

The Boulevard remains two-lane dual carriageway with a paved median through the two-lane roundabouts with Grantham Street and Empire Avenue, respectively. After a brief section of two lane each way single carriageway immediately west of the Empire Avenue roundabout, The Boulevard returns to being single-lane dual carriageway with a mostly painted median.

=== Wembley Downs ===
The Boulevard continues in a west-northwesterly direction for 1.9 kilometres (1.2 mi) adjacent to Wembley Golf Course, forming the boundary between Wembley Downs to the north and Floreat to the southeast and City Beach to the southwest. Unsignalised minor T-junctions with residential roads continue, as well as roundabouts at Bold Park Drive and Durston Road/Majalin Avenue.

=== City Beach ===
The Boulevard continues west for 1.1 kilometres (0.68 mi) until it terminates at West Coast Highway. While some T-junctions still occur with The Boulevard, many roads on the north side instead intersect one of two frontage roads, both also called The Boulevard, that run parallel to and north of the main road. The eastern frontage road begins at Durston Road and terminates at a cul-de-sac just east of Landra Gardens. The western frontage road begins collinear to the eastern frontage road at Landra Gardens, travels through roundabouts on either side of Empire Village Shopping Centre, intersects several residential streets, and finally continues west as Chipping Road. Both frontage roads are single carriageway roads with one lane each way.

On the main road, The Boulevard acquires cycle lanes on both carriageways just east of the T-junction with Oban Road. After the T-junction with Templetonia Crescent, which contains a right-turn pocket for eastbound traffic, The Boulevard median becomes exclusively paved. Approaching the signalised T-junction with West Coast Highway, its terminus, The Boulevard splits into a dedicated right-turn lane and a left-turn slip lane.

== History ==
=== Planning and initial construction ===
The original designs for Floreat and City Beach, adopted in 1925, included The Boulevard as an access road connecting the two proposed suburbs and the coast. The eastern side of the road would be an extension of the existing Cambridge Street, while the western end would turn south to connect with the end of the existing plank road (now Oceanic Drive), which was the only existing road through the area. The plans also intended for a tram line to eventually run down the centre of the road to the coast.

Construction began 16 December 1927 with the turning of the first sod. Despite early plans to upgrade to a permanent road two years after initial construction, permanent sealing with bitumen was ultimately performed during construction. The road was initially constructed to a width of 15 feet (4.6 m), with proposals during construction to widen it to 3 chains (200 ft; 60 m), including garden reserves, after the development of the adjacent suburbs. Construction required excavations and cuttings through limestone ridges and sandhills up to 16 feet (4.9 m) tall. The Boulevard was officially opened by Governor Sir William Campion on 23 November 1928. The portion of the road opened along the seafront, though a continuation of the rest of The Boulevard, was instead named Ocean Drive.

The Boulevard, the plank road, and Ocean Drive formed a clockwise one-way loop until 1929, when The Boulevard was made two-way.

=== Later modifications ===
The Boulevard was extended and widened to 20 foot (6.1 m) foundations from 1939 to 1941 to cater for increased traffic in the area. Several curves were also eased and superelevated.

As part of the development of the adjacent part of City Beach in the 1960s, the alignment of The Boulevard was modified to create a straight line west to the coast. The previous alignment, which curved southwest through the nearby Templetonia Park, is now used by a path through the park.

The section of The Boulevard between Templetonia Crescent and West Coast Highway was duplicated in the early 1970s. (Note: Landgate aerial imagery shows a single carriageway in 1970, and a dual carriageway in 1974.)

The section of The Boulevard between Floreat Avenue and Empire Avenue was redeveloped between 2000 and 2001. (Note: The Town of Cambridge approved works in July 2000 and Landgate aerial imagery shows a completed Grantham Street roundabout, Howtree Place traffic lights, and left-in/left-out Kirkdale Avenue by December 2001. Landgate aerial imagery previously showed a completed Empire Avenue roundabout in January 2001.) Modifications made included the construction of roundabouts at the Empire Avenue and Grantham Street intersections, the installation of traffic lights at the Howtree Place intersection, and the conversion of the Kirkdale Avenue intersection into left-in/left-out.

Traffic lights were installed at the intersection of The Boulevard and West Coast Highway as part of the 2003-04 Black Spot Program.

Roundabouts were constructed at the intersections with Bold Park Drive in 2006, (Note: Landgate aerial imagery shows no roundabout in late December 2005, and a completed roundabout in March 2006.) and Durston Road in 2008. (Note: Landgate aerial imagery shows no roundabout in January 2008, and a completed roundabout in December 2008.)

=== Trees ===
The trees along The Boulevard are heritage-listed. 365 trees were planted along The Boulevard on 24 July 1929 to commemorate the centenary of the City of Perth. Trees planted included pine trees, palm trees, and red-flowering gums. 60 jacaranda trees were later planted along The Boulevard in 1943. Pine trees were removed from The Boulevard during the late 1970s due to ongoing problems with the reduced water table and poor rains.

=== Heritage-listed houses ===
The heritage-listed Model Timber Home and Model Brick Home were built in 1934 on 12 The Boulevard and 6 The Boulevard, respectively. Designed for a competition, they were the two first homes constructed in the then-new suburb of Floreat during its first residential subdivision.

Later, several iconic houses designed by Bulgarian-born architect Iwan Iwanoff were constructed along The Boulevard. One notable example is the heritage-listed Paganin House at 165 The Boulevard, built 1965.

== Intersections ==
LGA	Location	km	mi	Destinations	Notes
Cambridge	Wembley	0	0.0	Cambridge Street	Y junction; no right turn from The Boulevard southeast-bound to Cambridge Street westbound
Cambridge	Wembley	0.08	0.050	Keane Street	Stop sign controlled T-junction
Cambridge	Wembley–Floreat boundary	0.2	0.12	Selby Street (State Route 64)	Traffic light controlled intersection; no right turns from Selby Street
Cambridge	Floreat	0.45	0.28	Bournville Street	Give way sign controlled T-junction; additional entry slip lane to Bournville Street from The Boulevard southeast-bound
Cambridge	Floreat	0.5	0.31	Birkdale Street	Stop sign controlled T-junction
Cambridge	Floreat	0.7	0.43	Everton Street / Winmarley Street	Give way sign controlled intersection, giving The Boulevard priority
Cambridge	Floreat	0.85	0.53	Lissadell Street / Seymour Avenue	Stop sign controlled intersection, giving The Boulevard priority
Cambridge	Floreat	0.95	0.59	Linden Gardens	Give way sign controlled intersection, giving The Boulevard priority
Cambridge	Floreat	1.2	0.75	Floreat Avenue	Give way sign controlled T-junction
Cambridge	Floreat	1.3	0.81	Kirkdale Avenue	Left-in/left-out
Cambridge	Floreat	1.4	0.87	Howtree Place	Traffic light controlled T-junction
Cambridge	Floreat	1.6– 1.7	0.99– 1.1	Ulster Road	Left-in/left-out; "in" is east of Grantham Street roundabout while "out" is west of it
Cambridge	Floreat	1.7	1.1	Grantham Street (State Route 72)	Two-lane roundabout; State Route 72 concurrency terminus
Cambridge	Floreat	1.8	1.1	Caithness Road	Left-in/left-out
Cambridge	Wembley Downs-Floreat boundary	1.9	1.2	Empire Avenue	Two-lane roundabout
Cambridge	Wembley Downs-Floreat boundary	2	1.2	Clanmel Road	T-junction
Cambridge	Wembley Downs-Floreat boundary	2.3	1.4	Thurles Road	Give way sign controlled T-junction
Cambridge	Wembley Downs-Floreat boundary	2.6	1.6	Cork Road	T-junction
Cambridge	Wembley Downs-Floreat-City Beach tripoint	2.9	1.8	Bold Park Drive	Roundabout
Cambridge	Wembley Downs-City Beach boundary	3.4	2.1	Alkoomie Terrace	Give way sign controlled T-junction
Cambridge	Wembley Downs-City Beach boundary	3.6	2.2	Majalin Avenue / Durston Road	Roundabout
Cambridge	City Beach	3.8	2.4	Kalinda Drive	Give way sign controlled T-junction
Cambridge	City Beach	4	2.5	Landra Gardens	T-junction
Cambridge	City Beach	4	2.5	Kateena Road	T-junction
Cambridge	City Beach	4.2	2.6	Oban Road	Give way sign controlled T-junction
Cambridge	City Beach	4.3	2.7	Templetonia Crescent	Give way sign controlled T-junction
Cambridge	City Beach	4.7	2.9	Chipping Road	T-junction
Cambridge	City Beach	5	3.1	West Coast Highway (State Route 71 / Tourist Drive 204)	Traffic light controlled T-junction
1.000 mi = 1.609 km; 1.000 km = 0.621 mi: Concurrency terminus; Incomplete access

== See also ==
- List of major roads in Perth, Western Australia
