= Building Revival Campaign =

Depression era Western Australian building campaign

The Building Revival Campaign was run by Western Australia's Royal Australian Institute of Architects during the Great Depression, with the aim of stimulating the home building industry.

The most significant activity of the campaign was that of the Model Homes Committee, which ran a competition for the design of two model homes, then oversaw their construction from donated material and labour. These became two of the first houses built in the new suburb of Floreat Park (now Floreat). They still stand today, and are heritage listed by the Heritage Council of Western Australia under the names Model Brick Home and Model Timber Home.
