= George Duerden =

British-Australian painter (1926–1986)

- Circus Story by George Duerden
- Born: 16 May 1926; Padiham, Lancashire, England
- Died: 12 March 1986 (aged 59); Western Australia
- Education: Self-taught
- Known for: Painting, Ceramics
- Notable work: The Circus; The Champion Cockerel; The Golden Stag
- Style: Expressionism

George Duerden (British English: /ˈdjuːərdən/) (16 May 1926 – 12 March 1986) was a British-born Australian expressionist painter who became one of Western Australia's most noteworthy artists. Born in Lancashire, England, he migrated to Australia in the mid-1950s and became an influential figure in the Western Australian art scene, developing a distinctive style featuring vivid, emotive representations of personal moments and memories.

== Life and career ==
=== Early life and migration ===
Duerden was born in Padiham, Lancashire, England, in 1926. Largely self-taught as an artist, he migrated to Australia in the mid-1950s, settling in Western Australia where he would spend more than 30 years.

=== Career in Western Australia ===
While working for the Department of Agriculture in the Harvey area, Duerden developed his artistic practice alongside his day job. From 1968-69, he studied at Claremont Technical College under Henry Froudist. He painted prolifically, once describing himself as having "1000 paintings inside his head screaming to get out." His work drew heavily upon childhood memories and he found inspiration in depicting the faces of the poor and impoverished.

Duerden was exhibiting his work by 1964, when he showed 59 paintings at the Old Fire Station that explored "the wonder of a child's world." The exhibition featured paintings with what critic I. M. Mason described as "elusive quality" and "compelling juvenile vibrancy," showing subjects ranging from children fishing to whimsical stylised fish and birds.

For some years, Duerden lived and worked in a studio that formed part of a group of old concrete and stone buildings on the coast near the Stirling Highway at Leighton.

He held what was described as his first one-man show at the Fire Station Gallery in Leederville in 1970, which was a sell-out. He continued to exhibit regularly, with his most recent solo exhibition at the Howard Street Gallery before his death. He was known as a gentle, peaceful man who sometimes gave his paintings away to people he liked.

=== Death ===
Duerden's career was cut short when he was killed in a road accident on 12 March 1986, just as he was considered to be approaching his artistic prime according to fellow artist Cliff Jones. At the time of his death, he was working towards a major exhibition at the Fremantle Art Gallery.

== Work ==
=== Style and technique ===
Duerden described himself as an expressionist artist who liked to paint from life. His work frequently depicted many of the mining characters in the area, and in his later years, he painted scenes of people in a bar at a Leederville hotel.

Commentators have noted that Duerden's painting style combined gestural improvisation with attention to surface effects. His technique frequently employed "scumbling," in which one layer of opaque brushstrokes is applied over another layer that has dried or partially dried, creating a layered surface and emphasizing the visibility of each stroke.

In portraiture, Duerden experimented with different approaches. For example, Miriam Stannage I (1969) has been described as recalling the work of Modigliani, with the subject's face and neck depicted in golden brown tones and defined by fine linear contours. In contrast, Miriam Stannage II (n.d.) incorporates dense red-orange marks layered over an underpainting of varied blues, suggesting the artist revised his initial conception of the background.

His landscapes explored a broad range of tonal variation. In works such as Garden, the palette extends from cool greys and blue-tinted clouds to warmer earthy tones. Some pieces may include the use of domestic enamel paint, which provided flow and density suited to his graphic effects, indicating an experimental approach to materials.

=== Themes ===
Duerden's work was deeply rooted in personal experience and memory. He painted from his childhood memories and turned to the faces of the poor and impoverished for inspiration. His subjects ranged from mining characters in regional Western Australia to urban scenes in Perth, capturing both rural and city life with equal emotional intensity.

== Collections ==
=== Public collections ===
The Art Gallery of Western Australia holds a significant collection of Duerden's work, comprising 20 pieces that include both paintings and ceramics. Notable works in the collection include Bluebirds in grasses, Children fishing, The Potter, and Cutting peat on the hill of Tara. The collection spans various subjects from landscapes such as Shay Gap landscape and Sea front at Lereaux to figurative works including Double nude and The Betrothed. His ceramic works include functional pieces such as bowls, teacups, and vases.

The City of Greater Geraldton Art Collection holds eleven works by Duerden, which were donated by the Art Gallery of Western Australia in 2011-12.

Other institutions that acquired Duerden's work include the University of Western Australia and the City of Fremantle.

=== Private collections ===
Duerden's work is held in the private art collection of held in the private art collection of Janet Holmes à Court , an Australian businesswoman and philanthropist. His paintings were also collected by prominent modernist architect Iwan Iwanoff, with works displayed in Iwanoff's own Perth residence (the Iwanoff House, 1960s), alongside pieces by other notable Australian artists.

== Exhibitions ==
=== Solo exhibitions ===
- 1964: Old Fire Station (59 paintings exhibition)
- 1970: Fire Station Gallery, Leederville (described as first one-man show, sell-out)
- 1980s: Howard Street Gallery
- 1980s: Fremantle Art Gallery (major retrospective)

=== Posthumous exhibitions ===
In 1993, the Art Gallery of Western Australia staged a retrospective exhibition of Duerden's work, curated by Frances Thomson and accompanied by a published catalogue. His work has also been exhibited at institutions such as the Fremantle Arts Centre.

== Art market ==
Duerden's paintings have appeared regularly at auction in Australia and New Zealand, with a total of 50 works sold between 1994 and 2024. Individual works have been sold at prices ranging from AUD 600 to over AUD 2,300. Duerden's artistic legacy remains alive in the contemporary art market, with his works continuing to generate interest at auction decades after his death.

== Legacy ==
At the time of his death, fellow artist Cliff Jones stated that Duerden was "essentially a country man who will be sadly missed in the Perth art world." Jones, along with artists Henry Froudist and others, recognized Duerden as one of Western Australia's most noteworthy artists who was taken before his prime.

Duerden was included in Janda Gooding's 1979 survey Some Contemporary Western Australian Painters, published by the University of Western Australia Press, which documented significant artists working in the state during that period.

The WA Art Gallery acquired Duerden's work, with the painting "Champion Cockerel" being specifically mentioned as part of their collection. His influence on the Western Australian art scene continues through the substantial collections of his work held in major public institutions.

== Publications about Duerden ==
- Gooding, Janda (1979). Some Contemporary Western Australian Painters. Nedlands, W.A.: University of Western Australia Press. OCLC 6533997.
- Duerden, George (1994). George Duerden retrospective. Art Gallery of Western Australia. ISBN 978-0730936060.
