= Paganin House =

Modernist house in Floreat, Western Australia

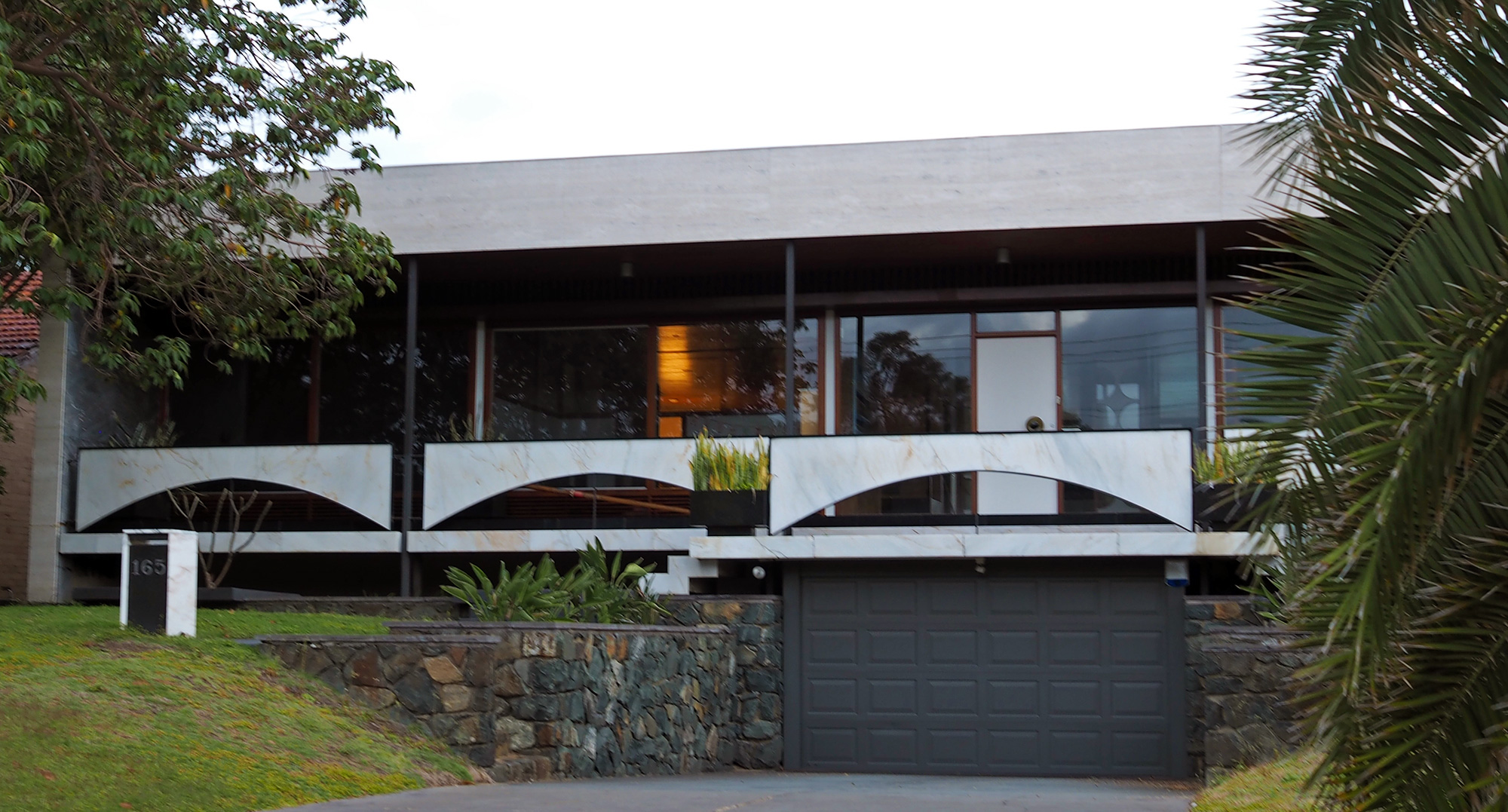
- Paganin House in 2014

General information
- Type: House
- Architectural style: Modernist
- Location: 165 The Boulevard, Floreat, Western Australia, Australia
- Coordinates: 31.9317°S 115.7830°E
- Opening: 1965

Technical details
- Grounds: 1,036 square metres (11,150 sq ft)

Design and construction
- Architect: Iwan Iwanoff

Paganin House is a residential dwelling in Floreat, a suburb of Perth, Western Australia, built in 1965. It is one of the best-known buildings designed by Bulgarian-born architect Iwan Iwanoff and is an iconic example of mid-century modern architecture in Australia. In December 2015, it was damaged significantly by fire.

== Design and landmark status ==
The Paganin family sold timber and marble, which encouraged extensive use of both materials throughout the house by Iwan Iwanoff, including a notable marble front verandah. The four-bedroom home has an open, practical layout, and according to the president of the Western Australian chapter of the Australian Institute of Architects, Phil Griffiths, is "very expressionistic, very creative, and quite brilliant". Construction was completed in 1965.

The house was recommended for listing in the State Heritage Register in 2006 (place number 17607). The property's original features were maintained and restored, and it was sold at auction by its second owner for $2.2 million in April 2013.

Paganin House was featured in the Chill Bill television commercials for Brownes Dairy, and a music video for Little Birdy. Scenes for the movie Thunderstruck were also shot at the home.

== Fire damage ==
Late afternoon on 21 December 2015, police officers conducting a traffic stop outside noticed the house was on fire. It took two hours for the Department of Fire and Emergency Services to contain the blaze. The owners were overseas and the fire was not suspicious. Arson investigators from the Western Australia Police found it was a "non-determinate fire". They were unable to ascertain the source because of the open plan layout and widespread use of timber in construction and decoration.

In 2015, the home was described by WA State Architect Geoff Warn as "an excellent balance of European elegance and the infamous open-plan Case Study Houses in and around Los Angeles". Warn said Iwanoff was "like our local Gaudí" and "the loss of this house is the loss of a local treasure". Real estate valuation agent Robbie Milligan stated, "Having inspected the property the replacement value on the home would be certainly in the millions and almost impossible to quantify due to its iconic status... It's genuinely a landmark when people drive past The Boulevard.”

The house was restored to Iwanoff's original design and featured on Restoration Australia on 17 March 2019.
