= City Beach Senior High School =

Former school in Perth, Western Australia

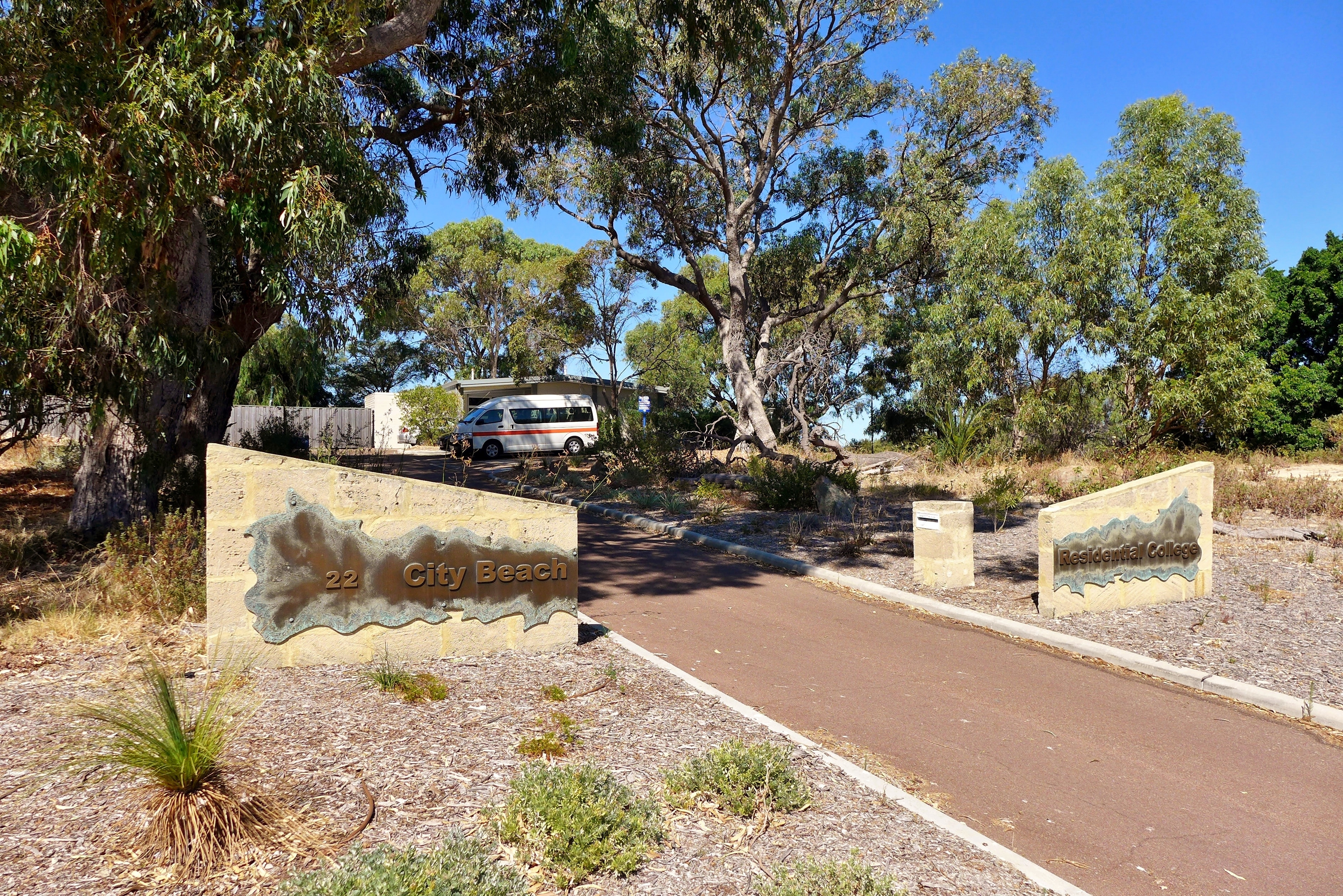
- City Beach Residential College, formerly City Beach Senior High School

Location
- City Beach, Perth, Western Australia; Australia
- Coordinates: 31°56′10″S 115°46′13″E

Information
- Type: (Former) Public co-educational senior high day school
- Status: Closed and repurposed
- Closed: 9 December 2005
- Educational authority: WA Department of Education
- Campus type: Suburban

City Beach Senior High School was a public co-educational senior high day school, that was located in City Beach, a beachside suburb approximately 10 kilometres (6.2 mi) west of Perth, Western Australia. The school was operated by the WA Department of Education.

The school's service area included City Beach, Floreat, Wembley Downs, and a corridor leading to Glendalough and Wembley. The 10-hectare (25-acre) campus was located 10 kilometres (6.2 mi) west of the city centre of Perth, and adjacent to the Bold Park Nature Reserve. The Bold Park Kindergarten was located on the campus property.

== History ==
The school opened in 1966. In 1997 the school had 350 students. The school closed on 9 December 2005. In 2007 the City Beach Residential College opened on the site of the former school.

== See also ==
- List of defunct public schools in Perth, Western Australia
