= Floreat Beach =

Beach in Western Australia

Coordinates: 31°55′49.80″S 115°45′18.25″E

Floreat Beach is in Western Australia, located off West Coast Highway, directly next to City Beach.

The beach's southern extremity is a groyne and continues north past a drain pipe until Hale Road dog beach. In front of the beach area near the groyne there is a carpark, boardwalk, grassed area, and cycle path. The groyne has a seasonally occurring sand-bar that forms a left breaking wave that is popular with bodyboarders and surfers.

The beach neighbours City Beach, which in season has surf life savers. It is between this beach and City beach that undersea cables are positioned.

Floreat Beach is located in the foreshore area.
