= Marsala House =

Heritage listing building in Dianella, Western Australia

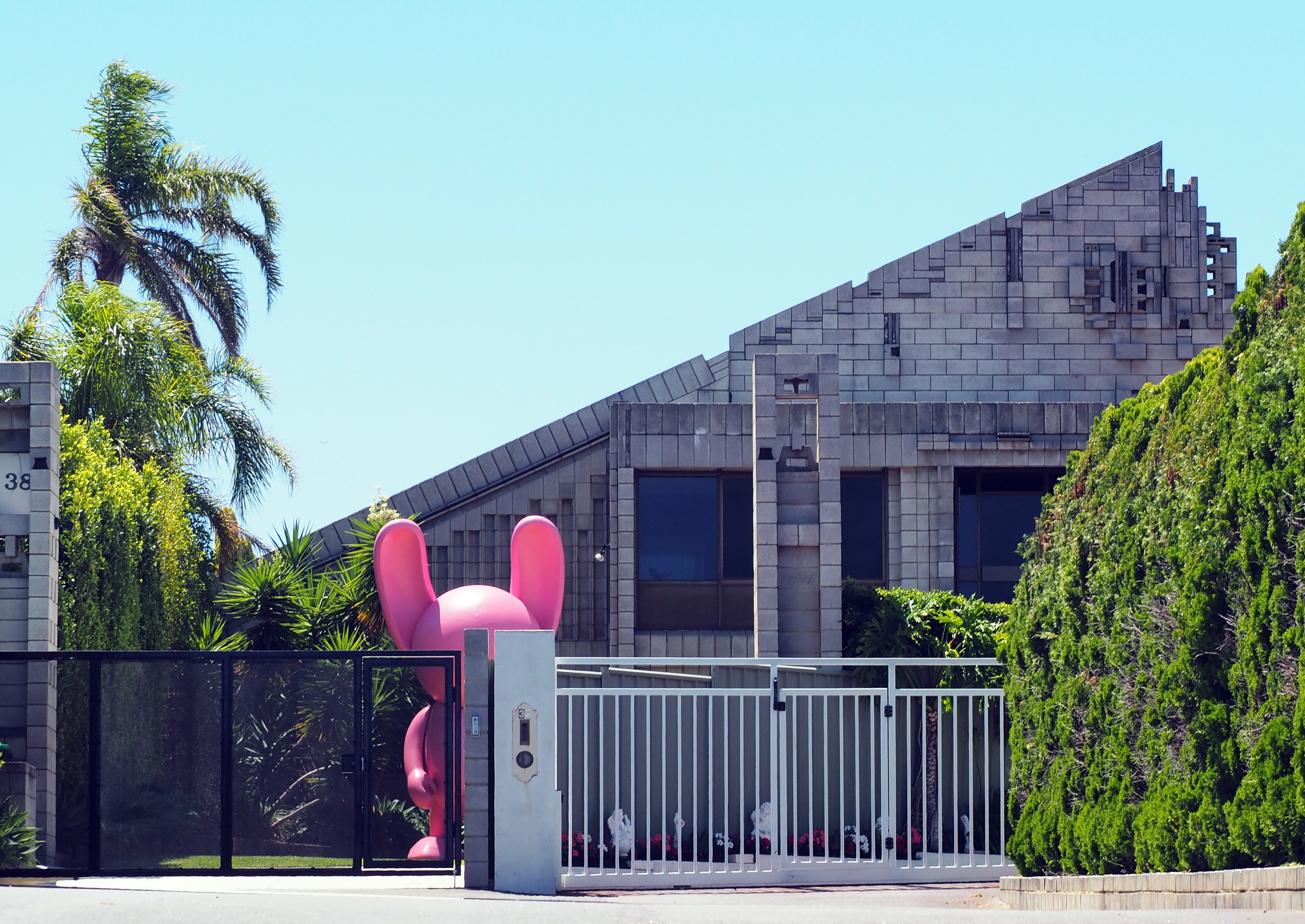
- Marsala House in 2017
- Interactive map of the Marsala House area

General information
- Type: House
- Architectural style: Brutalist
- Location: 38 Sycamore Rise, Dianella, Western Australia, Australia
- Coordinates: 31.8804°S 115.8646°E
- Opening: 1976

Technical details
- Grounds: 1,483 square metres (15,960 sq ft)

Design and construction
- Architect: Iwan Iwanoff

Western Australia Heritage Register
- Designated: 15 December 1999
- Reference no.: 09917

Marsala House is a residential home in Dianella, in suburban Perth, Western Australia, designed by architect Iwan Iwanoff. As of 2019, it is the youngest heritage-listed residence in Western Australia.

The brutalist concrete block home is considered "one of Perth's most iconic residences", and colloquially referred to as the "Dianella Disco House" due to its checkerboard-patterned illuminated dance floor in a specialised disco room.

== Architecture ==
Marsala House is a rare example of expressionist architecture in Western Australia, designed in an interpretive brutalist style by architect Iwan Iwanoff.

Marsala House demonstrates the new mass-produced materials commonly used during the 1960s and 1970s, such as concrete blocks, melamine laminates, and polystyrene.

The house went through several iterations in the design phase. The exterior uses predominantly rectilinear, block-based geometries, while the interior references curvilinear forms. The house features a dedicated "disco room" with a light-up floor and Murano glass chandelier, five bedrooms, four bathrooms, two bars, two sunken living rooms, and a swimming pool.

== Recognition ==
The Heritage Council of Western Australia added Marsala House to the permanent Register of Heritage Places (#9917) in December 2009. The listing stated that the building is significant because it is "an intact and aesthetically exceptional example of a creatively designed residence constructed of concrete blockwork", "one of the finest residences designed by highly-regarded Western Australian architect, Iwan Iwanoff", and "highly valued...as evidenced through references to the house in numerous published works".

The home was featured on Better Homes and Gardens.

Restoration work on Marsala House, conducted by Donaldson and Warn Architects, received the 2011 WA Heritage award for "outstanding conservation of a heritage project".

== Ownership ==
Marsala House is named after Tina and Sergio Marsala, who commissioned Iwan Iwanoff to design their home in the 1970s. Different designs were proposed by Iwanoff between 1973 and 1975, with the design finalised in 1976. The Marsalas travelled extensively, and requested the addition of a disco room after visiting Las Vegas in the late 1970s.

Christopher David Beer and Mark Etherton bought the home in 2005, and undertook conservation work. In 2012, the home was purchased by Perth street artist Stormie Mills and his wife Melissa Lekias for AU$2.2 million.

Marsala House was listed for sale in May 2021 with a pricing guide of AU$3+ million. Its online real estate listing was viewed over 10,000 times in the first four days. The house was relisted in November 2021, with a "high 2 millions" asking price and soon after sold for AU$2.8 million.
