= Model Brick Home =

Heritage listed building in Floreat, Western Australia

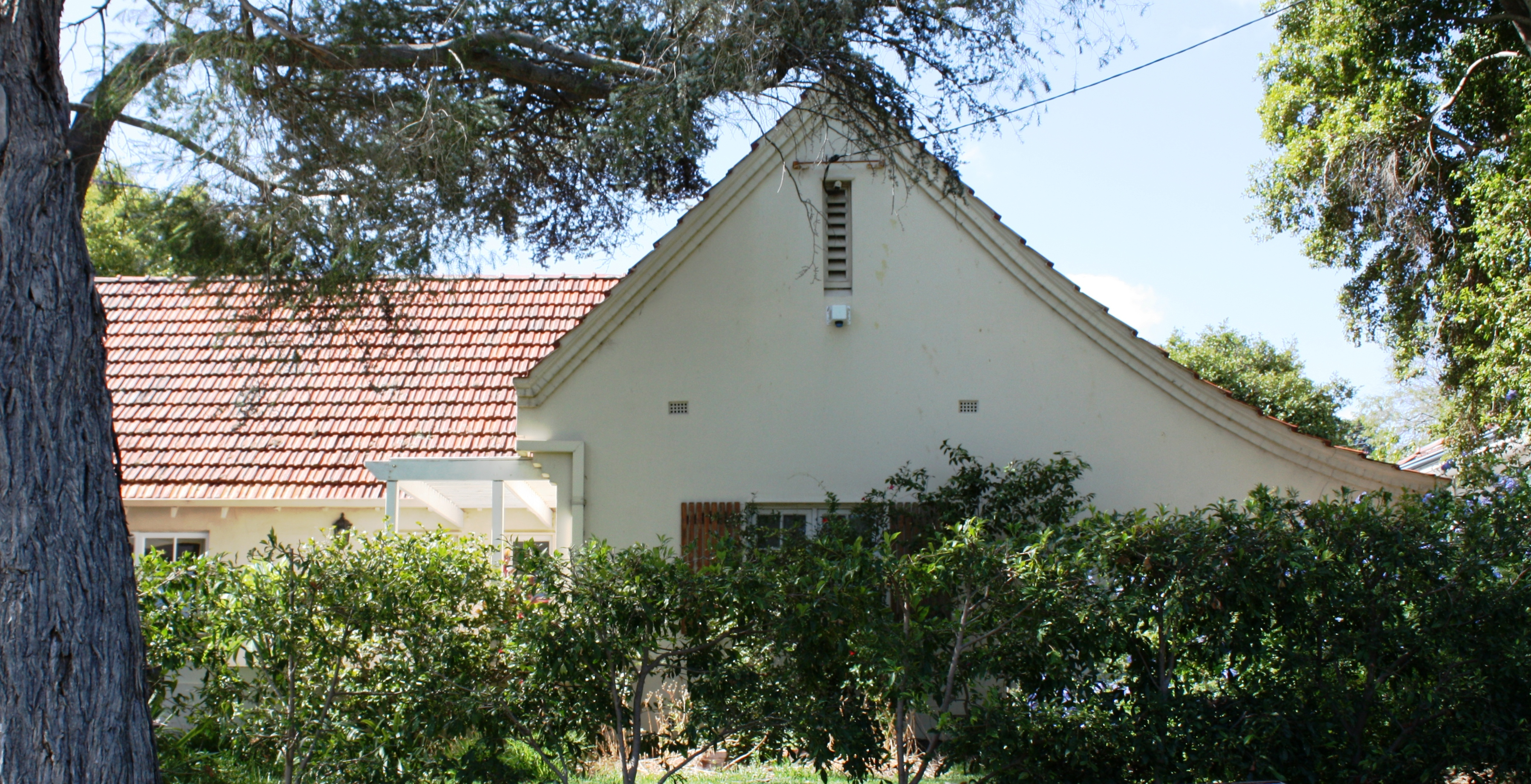
- Model Brick Home, 6 The Boulevard, Floreat
- Interactive map of the Model Brick Home area

General information
- Type: Brick-and-tile house
- Location: 6 The Boulevard, Floreat, Western Australia
- Coordinates: 31.9390°S 115.8036°E

Western Australia Heritage Register
- Type: State Registered Place
- Designated: 4 May 2001
- Reference no.: 8894

Model Brick Home is the name, for heritage-listing purposes, of a brick-and-tile house in Floreat, Western Australia. Designed by H. Howard Bonner in 1932, the plans won a competition for the design of an ideal cheap modern brick home; and the house was subsequently built on donated land, from donated materials and labour in 1934.

== Style and condition ==
It is a single-storey rendered brick-and-tile home built in a simplified Inter-War Old English Tudor Revival style, with Mediterranean Revival influences. The most distinctive architectural feature is the curved roof. The house and gardens have both been modified extensively since the house was built, so its authenticity today is only moderate.

== History ==
In the 1930s, Western Australia's Royal Australian Institute of Architects established a Building Revival Campaign, aimed at stimulating the home building industry, which, like all industries, was suffering the effects of the Great Depression. The campaign decided to run a competition for the best design for an ideal cheap modern timber house, and similarly for a brick house. The winner of the brick house section was the simplified Old English style design of H. Howard Bonner, from which Model Brick Home would be built.

Following the competition, the campaign sought donations of land, materials and labour, so that houses might be constructed from winning designs. A number of offers of land were made, and RIA ended up accepting an offer of two blocks in the first subdivision of the new suburb of Floreat Park (now Floreat). Model Brick Home was built on one of these blocks in 1934.

== Heritage significance ==
The building is significant as one of a small number of architect-designed buildings of the time; and as one of the first houses built in Floreat. Also, since Floreat was one of the first Perth suburbs built according to the principles of the garden city movement, the entire streetscape has significance as one of the first in Perth to be subject to planning regulations controlling urban design criteria such as setback.

== General references ==
- "Model Brick Home" (PDF). Register of Heritage Places — Assessment Documentation. Heritage Council of Western Australia.

== See also ==
- Model Timber Home
