= Iwan Iwanoff =

Australian modernist architect

- Born: Iwan Nickolow Iwanow; July 2, 1919; Kyustendil, Bulgaria
- Died: October 7, 1986 (aged 67); Perth, Western Australia
- Occupation: Architect

Iwan Iwanoff (Bulgarian: Иван Иванов; 2 July 1919 – 7 October 1986) also known as Iwan Nickolow (Bulgarian: Иван Николов) and Iwan Nickoloff Iwanoff (Bulgarian: Иван Николов Иванов) was a Bulgarian-born Australian architect known for working in the modernist and brutalist architectural styles. Iwan Iwanoff studied architecture in Europe before arriving in Perth to work as an architect. He eventually became renowned for his design characteristic which is mainly working with concrete blocks.

== Biography ==
=== Early years and education ===
Iwan Iwanoff was born in Kyustendil, Bulgaria into an artistic family, with his father, Nickolai Iwanow, a journalist and a poet, and his mother, Maria, née Schopowa. Originally named Iwan Nickolow Iwanow, he changed it to Iwan Nickoloff Iwanoff during his educational years, and shortened it later to Iwan Iwanoff.

After enduring a period of training in the military, Iwan Iwanoff studied fine arts under a famous Bulgarian Watercolourist and was himself a fine painter. As a result of his talents, he was offered a scholarship to study Fine Arts . In 1941, thanks to his father's advice, he made a decision to study architecture at the Technische Hochschule of Munich, Germany. He designed an outstanding chapel for the final project which brought him high praise when graduating with a Diploma of Engineering and Architecture in 1946. With his remarkable abilities in drawings and innovation in expressing his design, Iwan Iwanoff soon became a well known architect and his concept was that "architecture was an art".

He married Dietlinde Hildegunde Zenns on 25 October 1947 in Laufen, Germany.

=== Working life ===
Iwan Iwanoff worked in Laufen as a caricature painter in the immediate post-war period before working with Emil Freymuth, a modernist architect in Munich, Germany.

Leaving Germany with the help of the International Refugee Organization, Iwan Iwanoff and his wife left Europe on the SS Fairsea which left Naples on 7 February 1950, and settled in Fremantle, Western Australia on 2 March 1950. His Munich qualifications were not recognised in Australia. But shortly after, he gained employment under Krantz and Sheldon as a draftsperson. Krantz and Sheldon were a large commercial architectural company which had a major focus on designing flats in Perth. Iwanoff did some private architectural projects during this time.

He became a citizen of Australia in 1956. He obtained a transfer to the Melbourne architectural firm of Yuncken, Freeman Bros, Griffiths & Simpson in 1960. He transferred to Melbourne with the help of an old friend from Bulgaria, who himself had studied with Iwan and had emigrated to Australia. The reason for his brief stay in Melbourne, was to obtain registration, after several unsuccessful attempts in Western Australia. After visiting Western Germany, he briefly joined Bund Deutscher Architekten Organization (Federation of German Architects) before returning to Perth, to work with Krantz & Sheldon, in December 1961.

In 1963, he started his own business which was known as The Studio of Iwanoff. He had become a member of the Royal Australian Institute of Architects in 1963 and soon became a fellow in 1972. He was interested in exploring concrete blocks in various ways which allowed him to create high quality designs, especially in houses. Although he has been described as working in the Brutalist style, this only reflects the sui generis nature of his work and the difficulty of fitting him into recognised architectural genres. While he favoured the aesthetic effect of unadorned concrete blocks, giving his buildings a superficial resemblance to concrete brutalist works, he had nothing to do with the brutalist ethic of prioritising and emphasizing the structural and functional aspects of architecture over its aesthetic side. Rather than eschewing art and aesthetics as the brutalists at least claimed to, Iwanoff remained an artist throughout his life, and took great care in deciding just how far individual blocks should protrude or recede, sometimes arranging them with his own hands on site during construction. His intention was not to push a theory or reject tradition but to embody what he saw as the timeless traditions of art in contemporary form. Indeed, his emphasis on ornamentation and his playfulness with texture, light and shade place him, if anything, in the Rococo tradition, one at polar opposites to the spare modernism of his time and place.

Iwan Iwanoff died in Perth on 7 October 1986. His body was buried in Karrakatta Cemetery.

An exhibition of most of his works was presented at the State Archives of Western Australia between 15 April to May 13, 1991. The exhibition was curated by John Nichols and Duncan Richards, and was accompanied by a catalogue titled The art of architecture: the architectural drawings of Iwan Iwanoff (1919-1986).

In May 2025 he was commemorated with a street named in his honour in Northam, Western Australia, Iwanoff Road.

== Notable projects ==
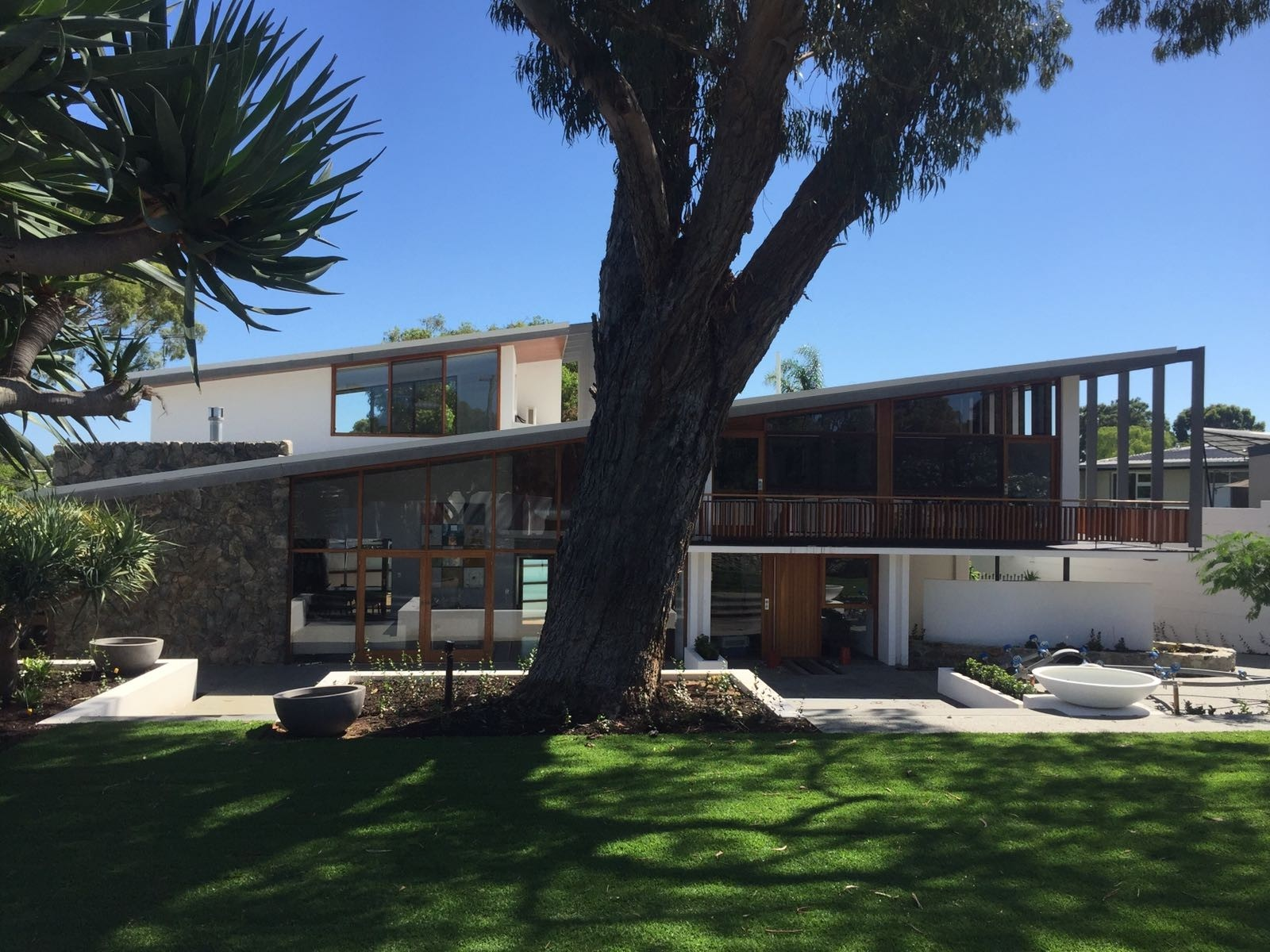
Schmidt-Lademann House in Floreat, Western Australia (2017)

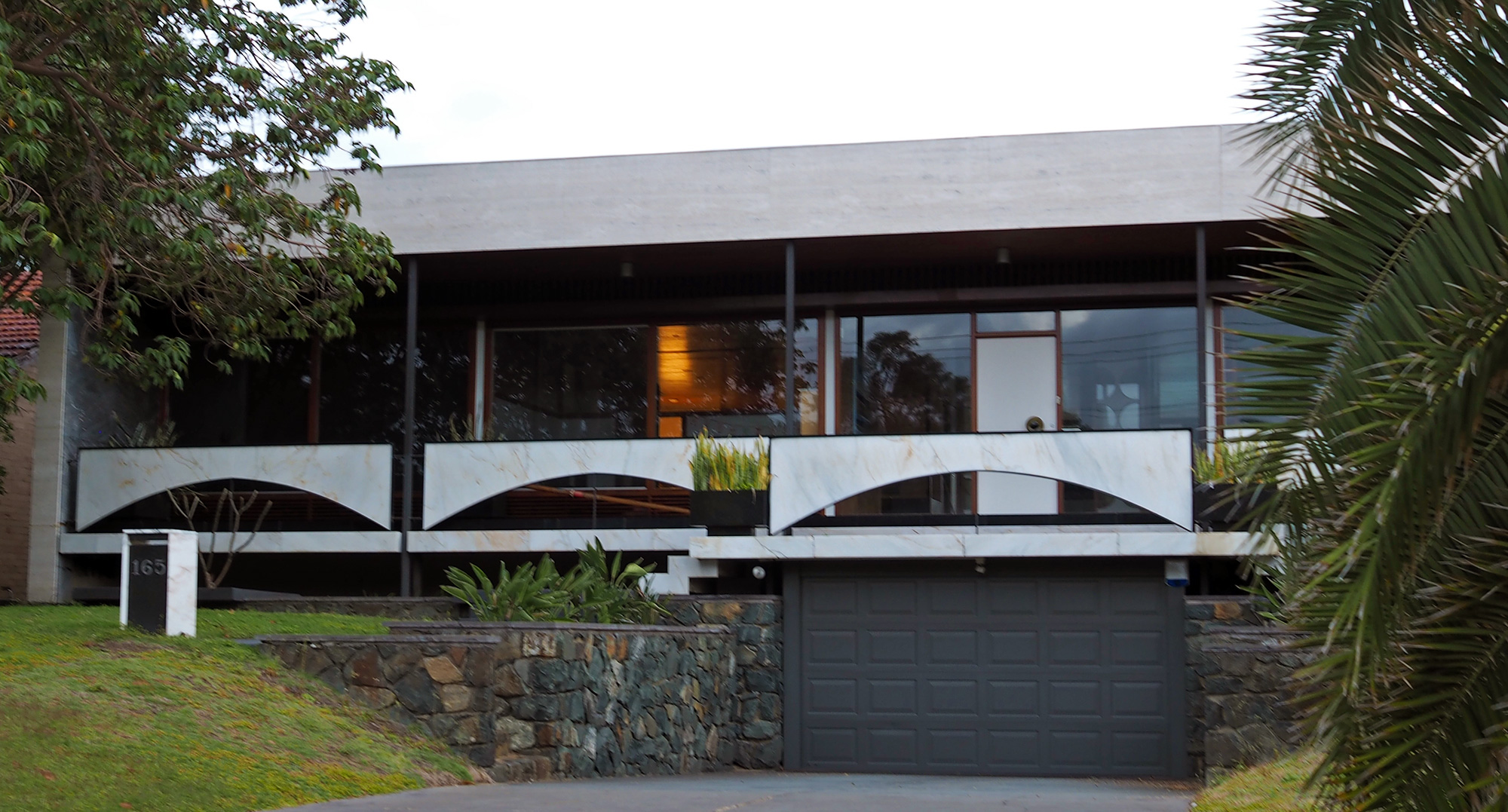
Paganin House in Floreat (2014)

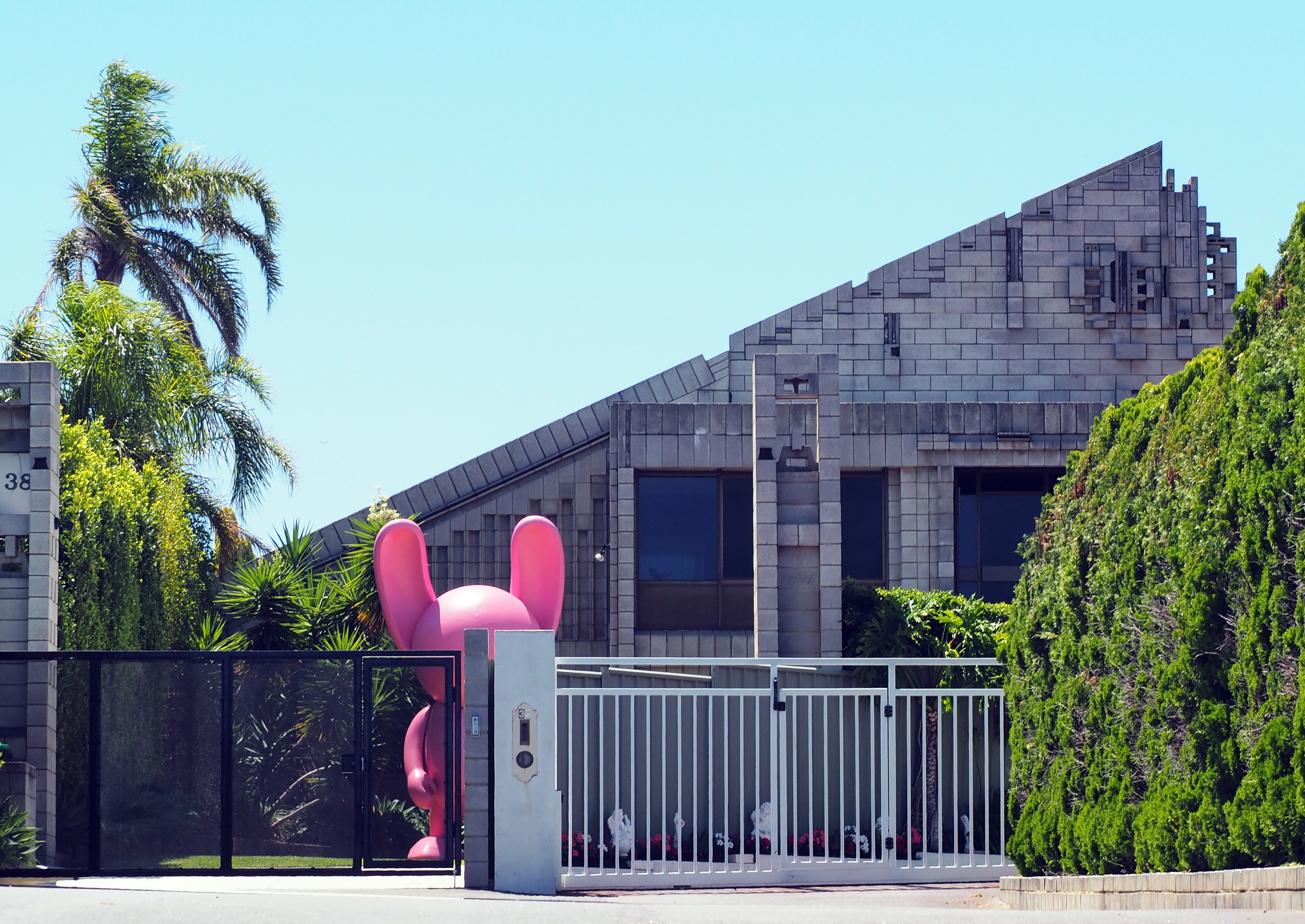
Marsala House in Dianella, Western Australia (2017)

- 1958: Schmidt-Lademann House, 22 Lifford Road, Floreat, Western Australia
- 1959: Toschkoff House, 32 Donegal Road, Floreat
- 1959: Golowin House, 47 Woodroyd Street, Mount Lawley
- 1965: Paganin House, The Boulevard, Floreat
- 1966: Iwanoff House, 16 Lifford Road, Floreat
- 1967: Roberts House, 12 Yanagin Crescent, City Beach
- 1968: Piccini House, 59 Guelfi Road, Balcatta
- 1968: Feldman House, 81 Cornwall Street, Dianella
- 1968: Shops/Medical Centre, Onslow Road, Shenton Park
- 1968: Bursztyn House, 29 Booker Street, Dianella
- 1969: Madaschi Residence, 53 Shannon Road, Dianella
- 1970: Featherby House, 41 Summerhayes Drive, Karrinyup
- 1970: Murphy House, 14 Tranmore Way, City Beach
- 1970: Booth House, 59 Oban Road, City Beach
- 1971: Northam Town Council Library, Northam, Western Australia
- 1971: Tomich House, 7 Dorking Road, City Beach
- 1972: Tombidis House, 10 Craig St, Wembley Downs
- 1972: Bell House, 9 Cornwall Street, Dianella
- 1972: Cavallaro House, 2 Constance Street, Darlington
- 1974: Northam Town Council Offices
- 1976: Marsala House, 38 Sycamore Rise, Dianella
- 1977: Kessell House, 4 Briald Place, Dianella
- 1978: Hi-Fidelity Recording Studio, 63 Thompson Road, North Fremantle
- 1983: Gelencser House, 7-9 Curtin Av, Cottesloe
