= Model Timber Home =

Heritage listed building in Western Australia

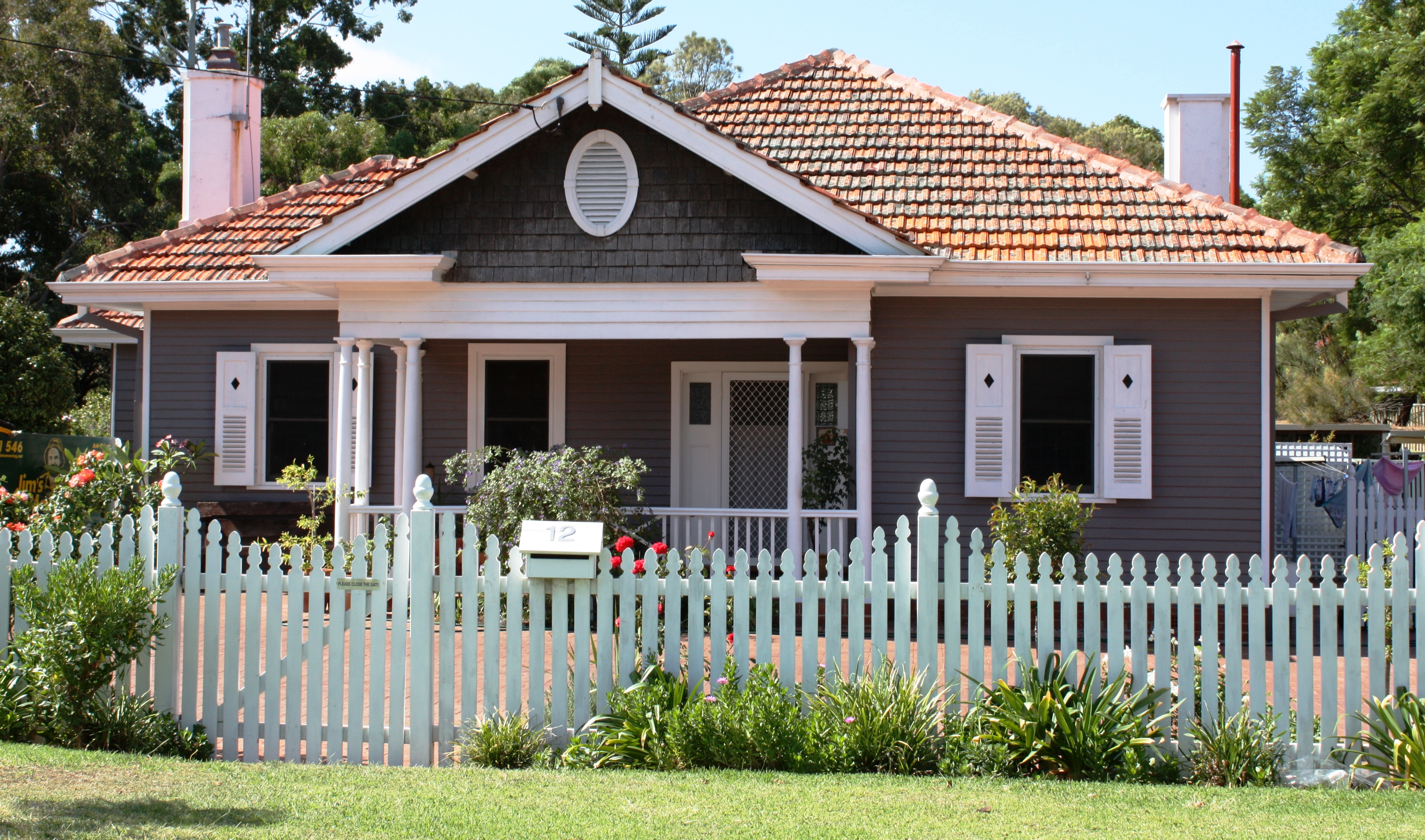
- Model Timber Home, 12 The Boulevard Floreat
- Interactive map of the Model Timber Home area

General information
- Type: Timber-framed house
- Location: 12 The Boulevard, Floreat, Western Australia
- Coordinates: 31.9387°S 115.8031°E

Western Australia Heritage Register
- Type: State Registered Place
- Designated: 26 June 2002
- Reference no.: 8895

Model Timber Home is the name, for heritage-listing purposes, of a timber-framed house in Floreat, Western Australia. Designed by Reginald Summerhayes, the plans won a competition for the design of an ideal cheap modern timber-framed home. The house was subsequently built on donated land, using donated materials and labour in 1934.

== History ==
In the 1930s, Western Australia's Royal Institute of Architects (RIA) established a Building Revival Campaign, aimed at stimulating the home building industry, which, like all industries, was suffering the effects of the Great Depression. The campaign held a competition for the best design of a modern timber house costing less than £A 600, equivalent to A$5,900 in 2022, and similarly for a brick house. The winner of the timber house section was the Californian Bungalow style design of Reginald Summerhayes, from which Model Timber Home would be built.

Following the competition, the campaign sought donations of land, materials and labour, so that houses might be constructed from the winning designs. A number of offers of land were made, and RIA accepted an offer of two blocks in the first subdivision of the new suburb of Floreat Park (now Floreat). Model Timber Home was built on one of these blocks in 1934.

== Style and condition ==
It is a jarrah weatherboard home built in the interwar Californian Bungalow style, with influences of Australian Georgian revival style. It remained in original ownership until recently, and retains many of the original features, including fittings and furnishings. The authenticity extends to the garden, which contains the original fences, gates, pergola, paving, paths and plants.

The only loss of authenticity arises from a small extension that was added in the 1970s, which resulted in the loss of one of the original bedrooms.

== Heritage significance ==
The building is significant as one of a small number of architect-designed buildings of the time; as an excellent example of interwar Californian Bungalow style architecture; and as one of the first houses built in Floreat. Also, since Floreat was one of the first Perth suburbs built according to the principles of the garden city movement, the entire streetscape has significance as one of the first in Perth to be subject to planning regulations controlling urban design criteria such as setback. Finally, the weatherboard construction is rare in Floreat, as restrictions were later put on its use in construction.

== See also ==
- Model Brick Home

== General references ==
- "Model Timber Home" (PDF). Register of Heritage Places — Assessment Documentation. Heritage Council of Western Australia. Archived from the original (PDF) on 30 June 2009.
