= Town of Cambridge =

Coordinates: 31°56′17″S 115°47′38″E

- Local government area
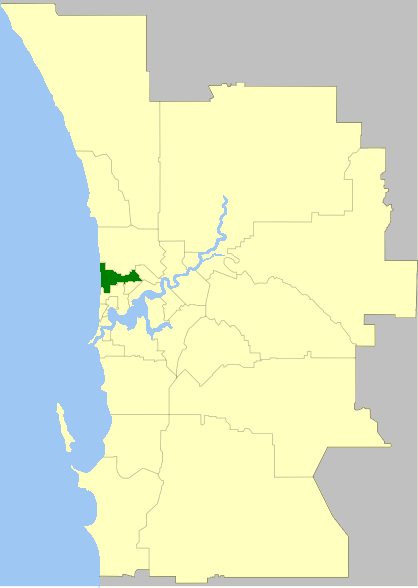
- The Town of Cambridge within the Perth Metropolitan Area

- Interactive map of Town of Cambridge
- Country: Australia
- State: Western Australia
- Region: Inner Metropolitan Perth
- Established: 1994
- Council seat: Floreat

Government
  - Mayor: Gary Norman Mack
  - State electorate: Churchlands, Nedlands
  - Federal division: Curtin

Area
  - Total: 22.0 km^{2} (8.5 sq mi)

Population
  - Total: 28,876 (LGA 2021)
- Website: Town of Cambridge
LGAs around Town of Cambridge
Stirling	Stirling	Stirling
Indian Ocean	Town of Cambridge	Vincent
Nedlands	Nedlands	Subiaco

The Town of Cambridge is a local government area in the inner western suburbs of the Western Australian capital city of Perth, about 5 kilometres (3 mi) west of the Perth central business district and extending to the Indian Ocean at City Beach. The Town covers an area of 22.0 square kilometres (8.5 sq mi) and had a population of almost 29,000 as of the 2021 Census. It was originally part of the City of Perth before the restructuring by the Government of Western Australia in 1994.

== History ==
Historically the area was part of the North Perth municipality, gazetted in 1901, which was absorbed into the City of Perth in 1915 after becoming unsustainable as an autonomous political entity. In 1993, the Government of Western Australia decided to split up the local government area (LGA) of the City of Perth, creating three additional LGAs and retaining a smaller City of Perth. The new LGAs were Town of Vincent, Town of Cambridge and the Town of Victoria Park.

In October 2020, the Town won an injunction against the state government's efforts to suspend the Council due to suspicions of interference in Town administration. This was the first time a local government in Western Australia successfully challenged ministerial authority to suspend a Council.

== Parks and reserves ==
Cambridge has many parks and reserves. The Town has two major reserves, Lake Monger and Perry Lakes, as well as 4.8 km of coastline, including City Beach and Floreat Beach and their respective parks, and the nearby dunes.

== Wards ==
The city has been divided into two wards, each electing four councillors.

- Coast Ward
- Wembley Ward

== Suburbs ==
The suburbs of the Town of Cambridge with population and size figures based on the most recent Australian census:

Suburb	Population	Area	Map
City Beach	6,805 (SAL 2021)	10 km^{2} (3.9 sq mi)	
Floreat *	8,621 (SAL 2021)	5.3 km^{2} (2.0 sq mi)	
Jolimont *	1,479 (SAL 2021)	0.7 km^{2} (0.27 sq mi)	
Mount Claremont *	4,999 (SAL 2021)	4.3 km^{2} (1.7 sq mi)	
Subiaco *	9,940 (SAL 2021)	3.1 km^{2} (1.2 sq mi)	
Wembley *	12,061 (SAL 2021)	4.2 km^{2} (1.6 sq mi)	
Wembley Downs *	6,743 (SAL 2021)	4.3 km^{2} (1.7 sq mi)	
West Leederville	4,340 (SAL 2021)	1.5 km^{2} (0.58 sq mi)	

(* indicates suburb only partially located within Town)

== Population ==
Historical population

Year	Pop.	±% p.a.
1991	22,740	—
1996	22,706	−0.03%
2001	22,859	+0.13%
2006	23,753	+0.77%

Year	Pop.	±% p.a.
2011	24,965	+1.00%
2016	26,783	+1.42%
2021	28,876	+1.52%

== Heritage listed places ==
As of 2024, 135 places are heritage-listed in the Town of Cambridge, of which 14 are on the State Register of Heritage Places, among them the Model Brick Home and Model Timber Home.
