= City Beach, Western Australia =

City Beach
- Suburb
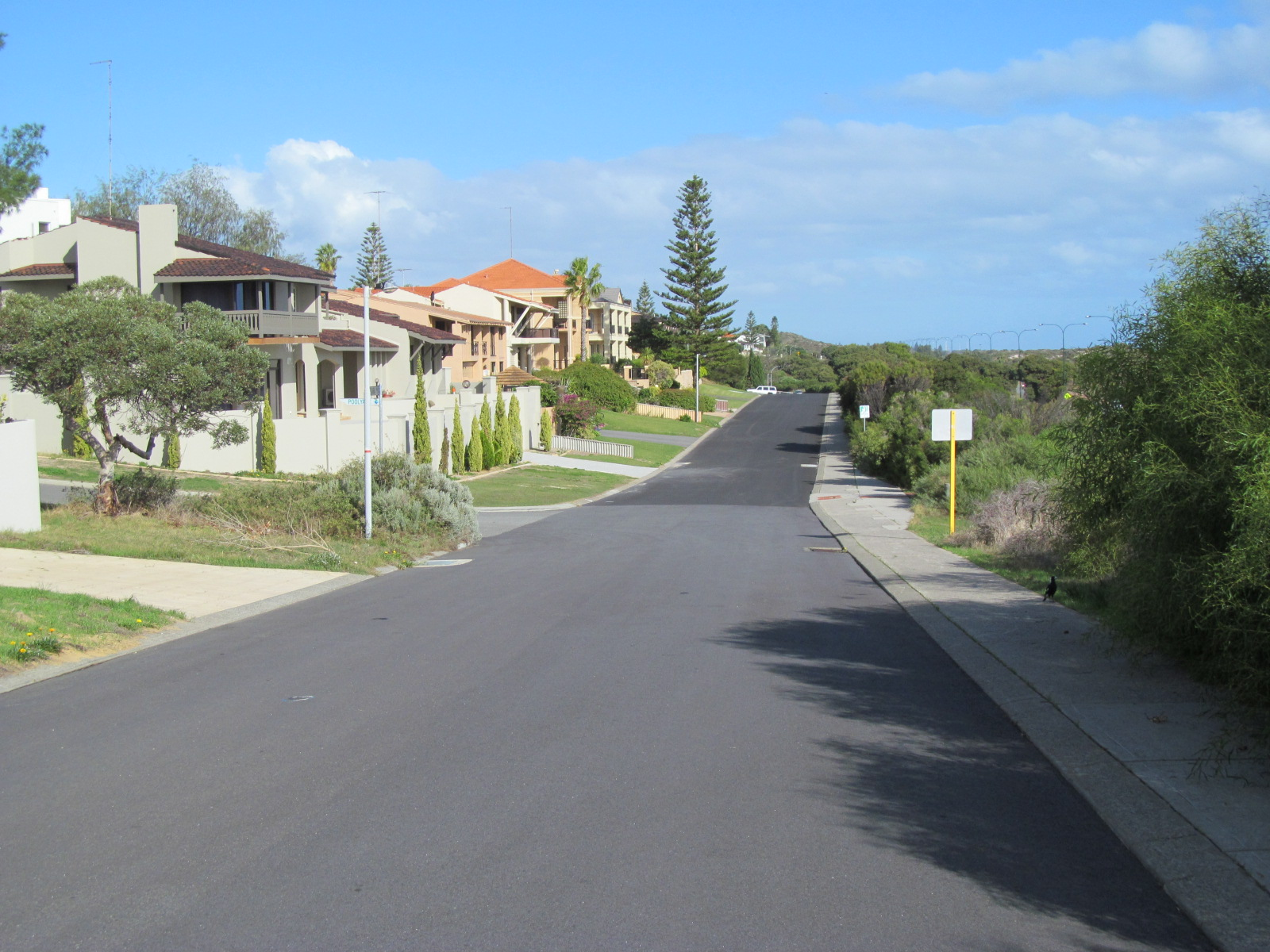
- Yaltara Road, City Beach
- Interactive map of City Beach
- Coordinates: 31.934°S 115.764°E
- Country: Australia
- State: Western Australia
- City: Perth
- LGA: Town of Cambridge
- Location: 10 km (6.2 mi) WNW of Perth CBD; 5 km (3.1 mi) S of Scarborough; 16 km (9.9 mi) N of Fremantle

Government
  - State electorate: Churchlands, Cottesloe
  - Federal division: Curtin

Area
  - Total: 10 km^{2} (3.9 sq mi)

Population
  - Total: 6,805 (SAL 2021)
- Postcode: 6015
Suburbs around City Beach
	Scarborough	Wembley Downs
Indian Ocean	City Beach	Floreat
	Swanbourne	Mount Claremont

City Beach is a beachside suburb of Perth, Western Australia, located within the Town of Cambridge. Its postcode is 6015. It is also the name of a beach in the suburb. House prices are generally quite expensive. In 2020, City Beach had the fifth highest median house price in Perth, at $1.628 million.

City Beach consists of three sections: a northern section (bordering Scarborough), a central section (bordering Wembley Downs and Floreat) and a southern section (bordering Bold Park). The centre part was built immediately prior to the 1962 British Empire and Commonwealth Games as an athletes' village due to its proximity to Perry Lakes Stadium in neighbouring Floreat.

== History ==
In 1917, the Perth Road Board purchased the Lime Kilns Estate of 1,290 acres (522 ha), situated between the Endowment Lands and the city, thus linking with the ocean beach. The Board proposed to lay out an up-to-date seaside town near the ocean beach on garden city lines, embodying approved Town Planning principles, and making ample provision for recreation purposes. By 1928, the Board had allocated finance to commence work, and also referred to the beach as "City Beach". It appears this name developed because it was an area developed by the City Council and much more acceptable than "Ocean Beach".

On 9 December 2005, City Beach Senior High School was closed by the Department of Education and Training due to a lack of new student enrolments and the opening of Shenton College 5 kilometres away in 2000.

== Recreation ==
Activities could be divided into that which takes place within the suburb of City Beach and that which takes place on the same-named beach. The area contains a football/cricket oval, numerous other grassy parks, as well a large area of bush land with a walking trail.

City Beach has two major beaches (Floreat Beach and the eponymous City Beach) as well as a dog beach. Each of those beaches has its own competitive surf lifesaving club with all the associated facilities. Surfing is popular in the region and City Beach commonly has reasonable surf conditions for beginner to intermediate, although the break (particularly in summer) is often a shore break that can be hazardous at times. Kitesurfing and windsurfing are also summer activities that are frequently seen at City Beach. The sand is white/yellow and soft, making it an ideal surface for the beach volleyball courts and matkot. The main swimming and surfing area is protected between two groynes and it is overlooked by lawns.

There are expansive sand dunes and bushland areas along the coast, which are home to wildlife such as hawks, mice and rabbits, and the occasional dugite. These dunes are currently under repair, and should not be entered, as the presence of people interferes with the rehabilitation of the dunes native plant and animal wildlife.

== Education ==
- City Beach Senior High School (closed 2005)
- City Beach Primary School
- Kapinara Primary School
- Holy Spirit Catholic Primary School
- International School of Western Australia (relocated June 2020)
- The Japanese School in Perth
- City Beach Residential College, a student boarding facility

== Transport ==
=== Bus ===
- 81 City Beach to Perth Busport – serves Launceston Avenue, Branksome Gardens and Oceanic Drive
- 82 City Beach to Perth Busport – serves Oceanic Drive, Marapana Road, Templetonia Crescent and The Boulevard
- 83 City Beach to Perth Busport – serves Chipping Road and Empire Avenue
- 84 City Beach to Perth Busport – serves Hale Road
