= Floreat, Western Australia =

Floreat
- Suburb
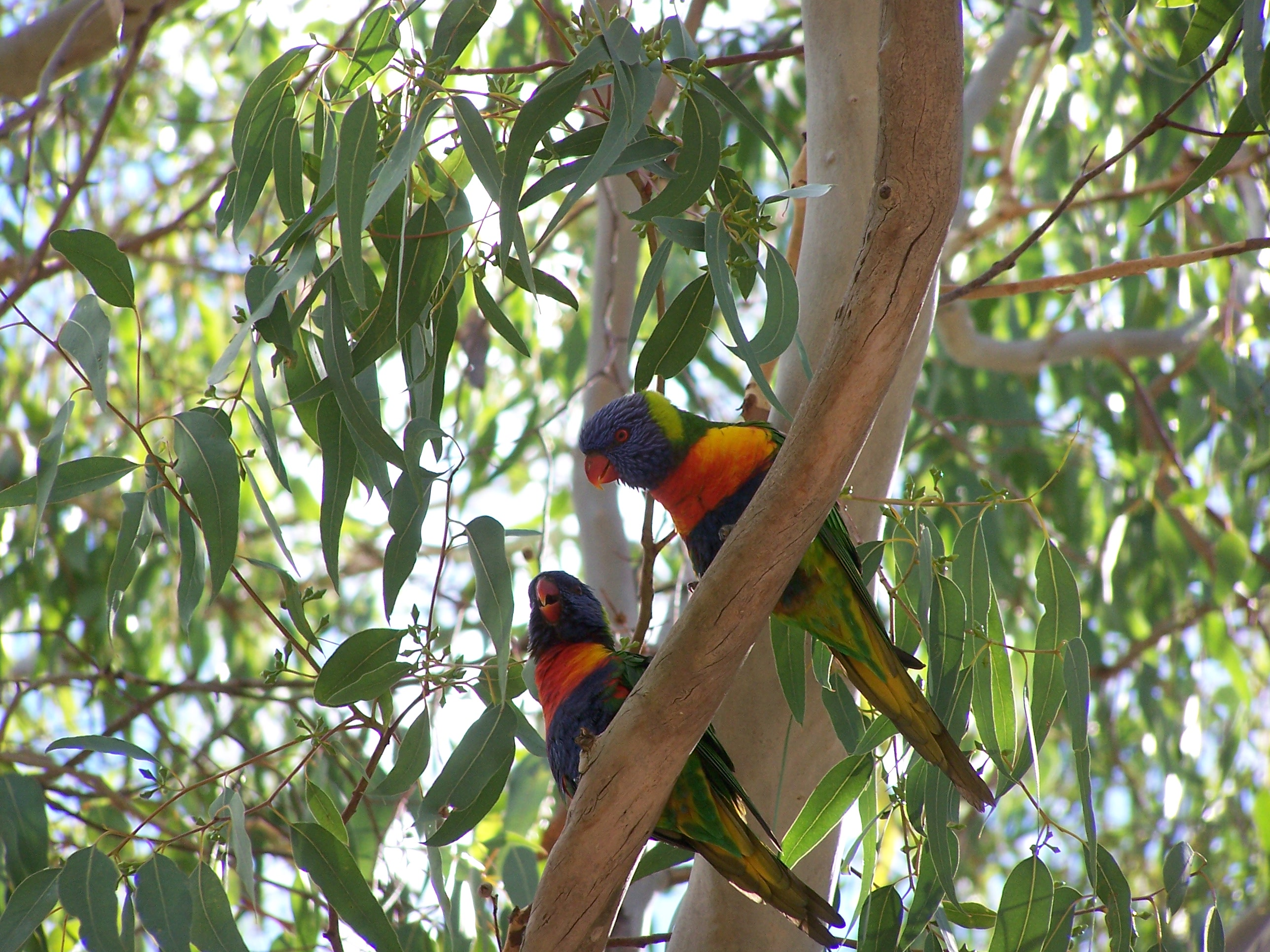
- Rainbow lorikeets at Perry Lakes
- Interactive map of Floreat
- Coordinates: 31.938°S 115.794°E
- Country: Australia
- State: Western Australia
- City: Perth
- LGA: Town of Cambridge
- Location: 8 km (5.0 mi) WNW of Perth CBD

Government
  - State electorate: Cottesloe
  - Federal division: Curtin

Area
  - Total: 4.4 km^{2} (1.7 sq mi)

Population
  - Total: 8,621 (SAL 2021)
- Postcode: 6014
Suburbs around Floreat
City Beach	Wembley Downs	Churchlands
City Beach	Floreat	Wembley
Mount Claremont	Shenton Park	Jolimont

Floreat is a residential suburb 8 kilometres (5 mi) west-northwest of the central business district of Perth, the capital of Western Australia. It is bordered on Underwood Avenue, Selby Street, Cromarty Road and Durston Road. It is the head of the Town of Cambridge, which has its municipal offices and library in the suburb. The name of the suburb stems from the Latin word for "flourish" or "prosper", which is also the motto of the City of Perth, of which Floreat was a part when it was first built.

== Demographics ==
Floreat had a population of 8,621 at the 2021 census, an increase of 722 from the 2016 census. It has a median age of 40, with 2,829 private dwellings.

== Amenities and facilities ==
The Floreat Forum shopping centre is located in the suburb. It sits adjacent to the Town of Cambridge municipal offices and library. The centre also boasts a new Medical Centre, dining precinct and tavern. The suburb also sits adjacent to the popular Cambridge Street dining and commercial strip in neighbouring Wembley.

Floreat contains a range of sporting facilities, most notably the WA Athletics Stadium (opened May 2009) and Bendat Basketball Centre (opened January 2020). Both were developed following the closure and subsequent demolition of Perry Lakes Stadium and Perry Lakes Basketball Stadium. The suburb also contains the WA Rugby Centre (home of RugbyWA), Cambridge Bowling Club, and Perry Lakes Reserve.

== Education ==
Floreat contains a public primary school, a lower primary campus of a Catholic school, and a private training institution. It was previously in the catchment area for the now-closed City Beach High School; high school students now attend Churchlands Senior High School if they live north of Cambridge Street, or Shenton College if they live on the south side.

Floreat Park Primary School, opened in 1951, is the only public school within the suburb's boundaries, and caters for students from kindergarten to Year 6.

The Floreat campus of Newman College, a multi-campus Catholic K-12 school, is located on Peebles Road, and caters for students from kindergarten to Year 3, after which students must shift to the school's senior campuses in nearby Churchlands. The site was formerly occupied from 1962 to 1983 by Brigidine College, a Catholic girls' school, which had shifted from a prior campus in Subiaco. The current campus was formed after a merger between Brigidine College and two other local Catholic schools, Marist College and Siena College, taking effect from 1984.

The Perth campus of the Australian Institute of Management is also located within the suburb. The institute provides training and qualifications in management skills; the Perth campus opened in 1987, and is situated on Birkdale Street.

== Transport ==
Roads

Several major roads pass through and border the suburb. To the north, Floreat is bordered by The Boulevard, which continues through the middle of the suburb past Floreat Forum, as well as Empire Avenue, Cromarty Road and Pearson Street. To the east it is bordered by Selby Street (State Route 64) and to the south by Underwood Avenue (State Route 65). On the western side the border is formed of Perry Lakes Drive, Bold Park Drive, and a small section of Oceanic Drive. The suburb is bisected east-west by Cambridge Street/Oceanic Drive, as well as The Boulevard and Grantham Street (State Route 72), with Brookdale Street/Howtree Place cutting through north-south.

Public Transport

Floreat is served by the following Transperth bus routes which all converge at Floreat Forum, apart from the 84, 85, 998 and 999 which run along the western edge.

- Route 28 to Claremont Station via Perth HPC
- Route 28 to Perth Busport via Subiaco
- Route 28 to Perth HPC/Shenton Park Station (School Special Service)
- Route 81 to South City Beach via Oceanic Drive & City Beach Foreshore
- Route 81 to Perth Busport via Cambridge Street
- Route 82 to City Beach Foreshore via The Boulevard
- Route 82 to Perth Busport via The Boulevard & Cambridge Street
- Route 83 to City Beach (Chipping Road) via Empire Avenue
- Route 83 to Perth Busport via Grantham Street
- Route 84 to City Beach (Hale Road) via Pearson Street and Hale Road
- Route 84 to Perth Busport via Grantham Street
- Route 85 to Glendalough Station via Herdsman Avenue
- Route 85 to Perth Busport via Cambridge Street
- CircleRoute 998 Clockwise orbital around inner city
- CircleRoute 999 Anticlockwise orbital around inner city

== Politics ==
Floreat has traditionally favoured conservative candidates throughout its history, generally those of the centre-right Liberal Party. The suburb is located in the federal electorate of Division of Curtin, currently held by Independent MP Kate Chaney, who unseated the former Liberal Party MP Celia Hammond in the 2022 Australian Federal Election. The suburb is split between the state electorates of Churchlands, held by Liberal leader Basil Zempilas, and Nedlands, held by Liberal member Jonathan Huston.
