= John Prowse =

Australian politician

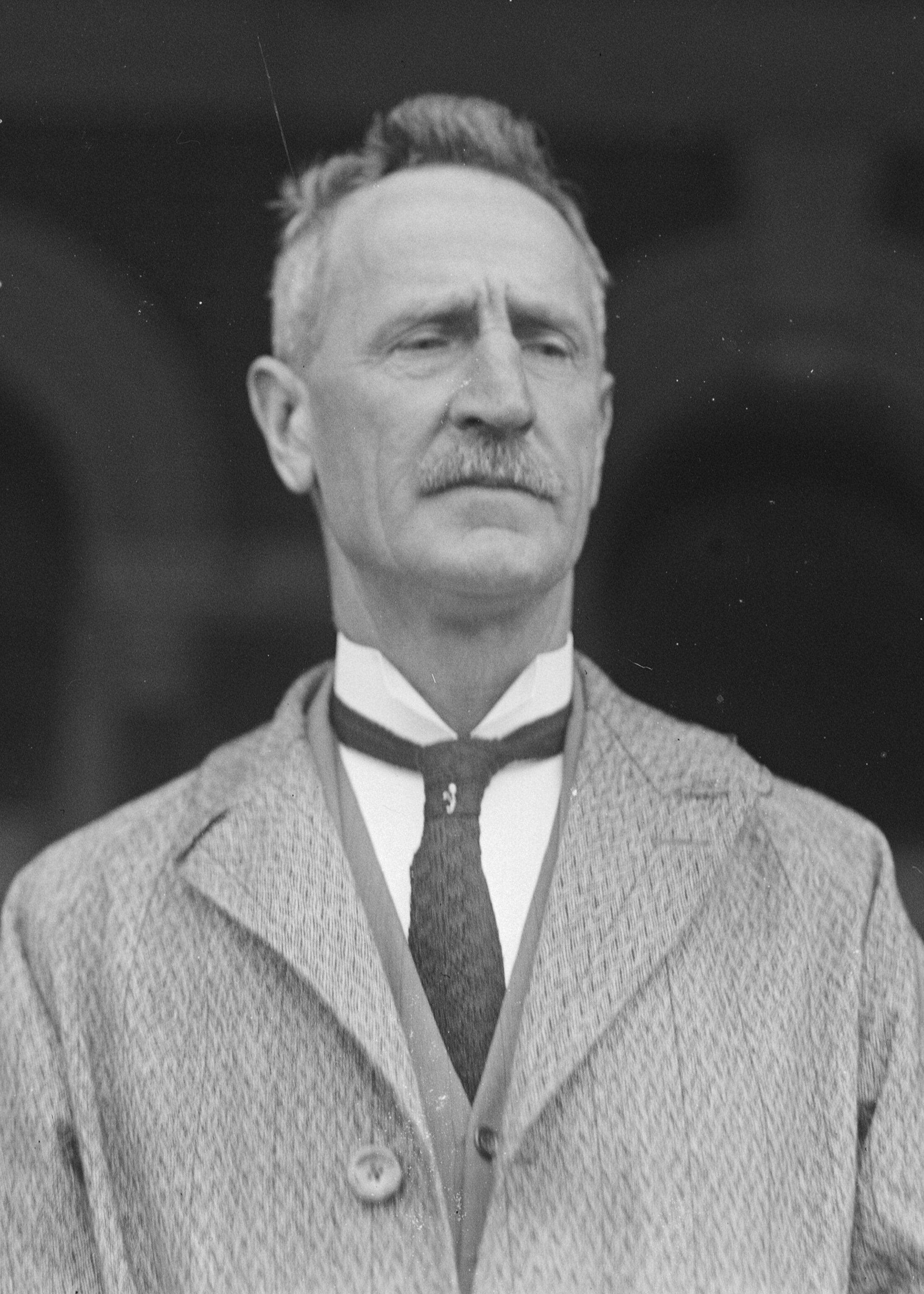

Member of the Australian Parliament for Swan
- In office 13 December 1919 – 16 December 1922
- Preceded by: Edwin Corboy
- Succeeded by: Henry Gregory

Member of the Australian Parliament for Forrest
- In office 16 December 1922 – 21 August 1943
- Preceded by: New seat
- Succeeded by: Nelson Lemmon

Personal details
- Born: 16 June 1871 Adelong, New South Wales, Australia
- Died: 20 May 1944 (aged 72) Donnybrook, Western Australia, Australia
- Party: Country
- Spouse(s): Edith McNeilance (m. 1896; died 1939) Jean Murdoch (m. 1941)
- Relations: Edgar Prowse (nephew)
- Occupation: Insurance agent

John Henry Prowse (16 June 1871 – 20 May 1944) was an Australian politician. Born in Adelong, New South Wales, he was educated at public schools and then at Kings College, Melbourne. He became an insurance agent and then a station owner in Western Australia, where he eventually became a Perth City Councillor, serving as Mayor 1913–1914. In 1919, Prowse was elected to the Australian House of Representatives as the member for Swan, representing the Farmers' and Settlers' Association, which in 1920 solidified to become the Australian Country Party. Prowse transferred to the new seat of Forrest in 1922, allowing party colleague Henry Gregory (member for the abolished Dampier) to contest Swan. He served as chairman of committees from 1934 to 1943, the first member of his party to hold the position.

Prowse held Forrest until his defeat in 1943 by future Labor minister Nelson Lemmon. He died at his home in Donnybrook, Western Australia the following year.

== Early life ==
Prowse was born on 16 June 1871 in Adelong, New South Wales. He was the son of Mary Ann (née Wylie) and James Prowse. His mother was born in Ireland, while his father, born in England, was a miner and farmer.

Prowse was educated at Adelong Public School and King's College in Melbourne. After leaving school he began working for the United Insurance Company. In 1889 was appointed manager of its branch in Townsville, Queensland. He relocated to Perth in 1903 after being appointed state manager for Western Australia. In 1914 he became one of the inaugural directors of the cooperative Westralian Farmers Ltd (now Wesfarmers).

== Community work ==
Prowse was a lay preacher in the Methodist Church and was active in the temperance movement, serving as president of the West Australian Temperance Alliance from 1905 to 1911. He was also a grandmaster in the Orange Order and "busy in the early organisation of philanthropic causes in Perth, including the Blind and Deaf and Dumb Institutions, and the Children’s Protection Society".

In 1919, Prowse was appointed by the state government to the board of the newly created Discharged Soldiers' Land Settlement Board, overseeing the soldier settlement scheme for World War I veterans. He was subsequently elected as its inaugural chair.

== Politics ==
=== Local government ===
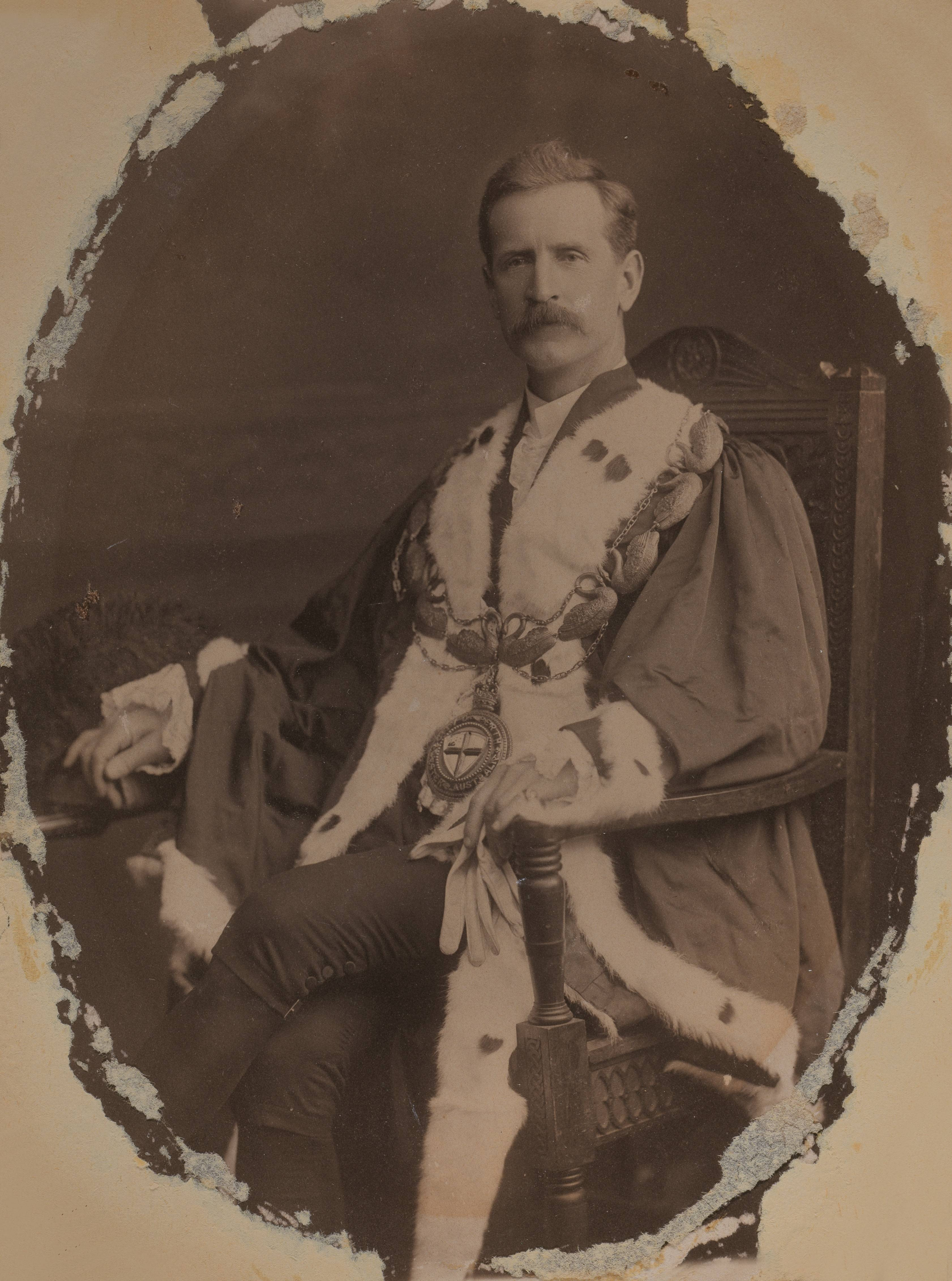
Prowse in 1913 as mayor of Perth

Prowse served as mayor of the Municipality of Subiaco from 1904 to 1905. He was a supporter of the Greater Perth Movement and was elected to a one-year term as mayor of Perth in 1913. During his tenure the Municipality of Leederville and Municipality of North Perth were merged into the City of Perth.

=== Federal politics ===
In 1913, Prowse was elected to the executive of the newly created Farmers' and Settlers' Association of Western Australia (FSA). He was elected to the House of Representatives at the 1919 federal election, standing as an FSA candidate and defeating the incumbent Australian Labor Party (ALP) member Edwin Corboy in the seat of Swan. He joined the new federal Country Party when parliament sat after the election.

Prowse transferred to the new seat of Forrest at the 1922 election. He was an opponent of Prime Minister Billy Hughes and after the election supported making Hughes' removal as prime minister a condition of the Country Party entering into a coalition with Hughes' Nationalist Party. He was subsequently appointed as a government whip in the Bruce–Page government, but resigned in August 1924 in opposition to the electoral pact between the two parties.

Following the 1934 election, Prowse was elected chairman of committees in the House of Representatives. He was re-elected after the 1937 election and, along with UAP speaker Walter Nairn, continued in the post after the Fadden government was defeated in 1941 and replaced by an ALP minority government led by John Curtin. Both Prowse and Nairn resigned in June 1943 to support a motion of no confidence in the Curtin government, but were themselves defeated in the ALP landslide victory at the 1943 election.

== Personal life ==
Prowse married Edith McNeilance in 1896, with whom he had six children. He was widowed in 1939 and remarried in 1941 to Jean Murdoch, with his parliamentary colleague Harold Holt serving as best man.

In 1910, Prowse went into partnership with his brother Albert and purchased Wallatin station, situated in the Wheatbelt north of Doodlakine. Albert's son Edgar Prowse was elected to federal parliament in the 1960s.

Prowse retired to his farming property Bangadang near Donnybrook, which he had purchased in 1929. He died suddenly at Bangadang on 20 May 1944, aged 72.

Parliament of Australia
Preceded by Edwin Corboy	Member for Swan; 1919–1922	Succeeded by Henry Gregory
Preceded by New seat	Member for Forrest; 1922–1943	Succeeded by Nelson Lemmon
