= Urban planning in Australia =

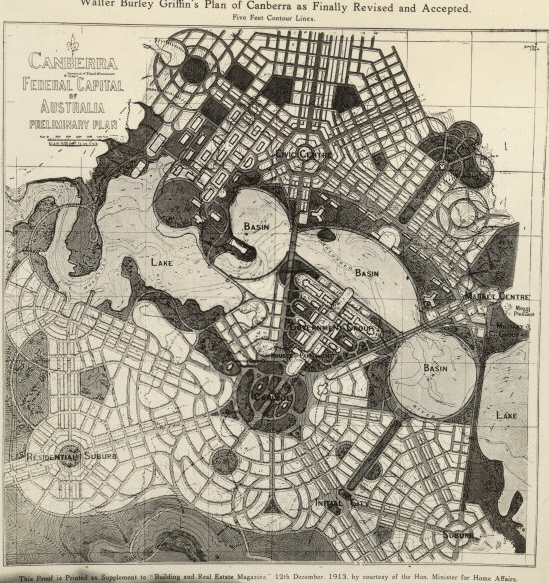
1913 plan for Canberra by Walter Burley Griffin

Urban planning in Australia describes the process of urban planners carrying out land-use planning by implementing zoning regulation. Australia is one of the most highly urbanised societies in the world. Continued population growth in Australian cities is placing increasing pressure on infrastructure, such as public transport and roadways, energy, air and water systems within the urban environment.

Urban planning is undertaken at all levels of Government in Australia. However, the Federal Government is playing an increasing part in setting policy as part of an overall response to developing climate adaptation and mitigation strategies. The local government has also been engaging with the community to make decisions on urban planning designs that help to promote social cohesion. Over the past few decades Australians have developed a respect for urban heritage places and community groups have fought hard to stop developers from destroying them.

Zoning is the single most consequential force in Australian housing. According to the Reserve Bank of Australia, zoning restrictions add between $150,000 and $500,000 to new homes in Australia's bigger capital cities, affecting housing affordability in Australia. Urban planner's have contested this finding, claiming zoning protects the quality of cities and that economists fail to understand nuances of the housing market.

== History ==
Urban planning in Australia has evolved since early British colonial settlement, and has been heavily influenced by contemporary planning movements in Britain, the United States of America and western Europe. However, over the past century, distinctly Australian responses and solutions to Australian urban issues have developed.

=== British Colonial period (1788–1901) ===
==== Early planning ====
The first examples of town planning in Australia occurred during the early phases of the Colonial era, where critical decisions locked in "path dependency" for the future form of cities. Typically this involved colonial Governors undertaking surveying for land grants and subdivisions, and making executive decisions on the location and construction of roads, rail transport, water supply and other basic infrastructure to support early penal and military settlements. The surveyors general were the chief public servants responsible for subdividing the territory. Primacy was given to the functional and practical needs of Colonial administration, as opposed to more lofty civic or aesthetic ideals.

British colonisation policy was based on the establishment of planned orderly towns based on the grid model, which was similar across cities. This was based on the Grand Model first proposed for the Irish and American colonies by Anthony Ashley Cooper and John Locke. This was itself based on the Greek and Roman traditions of urban planning. Another influence was the plan for Freetown by Granville Sharp. Economic and administrative needs caused a settlement pattern based on primate locations separated from each other by large distances in the form of capital cities, which dominated their respective territories. As port cities, they provided connections to Britain and international markets. Early towns included Sydney, Parramatta, Hobart, Port Macquarie, Brisbane, and Albany.

In 1829, Governor Ralph Darling adopted Sharp's principles and had Surveyor General Thomas Mitchell plan towns in the colony. The towns were to be identical with 66 feet (20.1 metres) wide streets, equal allotments, and a balance of private and public land. The equal lot sizes could be seen as a democratic expression. Surveyor Robert Hoddle made the Melbourne plan in 1837. Based on British survey technique, the surveyors would plan a town within a larger Township Reserve meant for parklands and future growth, with larger plans setting aside sites for a courthouse, a prison, churches, schools, and larger suburban allotments.

==== Major cities and urban growth ====
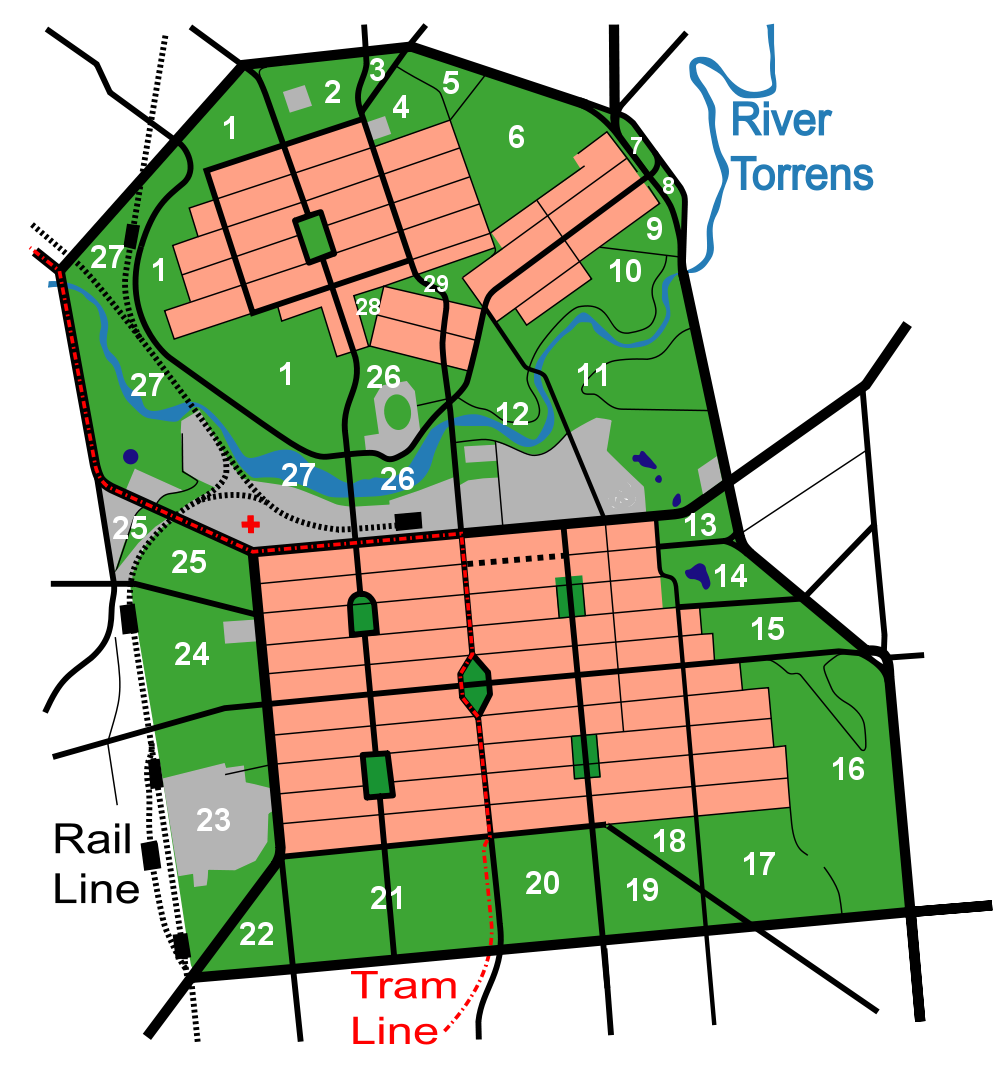
Adelaide city centre was designed in grid pattern in 1837.

Sydney itself was less clearly planned due to the shape of Port Jackson and the disorganisation of the early years. The other capital cities were founded in the early 19th century, with Hobart in 1804, Brisbane in 1825, Perth in 1829, and Adelaide as well as Melbourne in 1837. Adelaide was planned by Colonel William Light, a Colonial Surveyor and the Surveyor-General for the colony of South Australia, and although the plan was not entirely realised, it is widely regarded as an achievement of colonial era civic design and as having an influence on the Garden city movement.

Rapid colonial expansion in the 19th century, matched by economic growth, resulted in Australia becoming one of the most highly urbanised nations in the world. The gold rushes and the migration they attracted were key contributors to this effect. However, the simple colonial plans of the cities were inadequate to handle the growth. The suburbs surrounding inner-cities were often crowded and poorly serviced terrace housing subdivided by private developers. The states were also reluctant to provide basic infrastructure such as water and sewerage systems. In 1856, Sydney had a worse proportion of childhood deaths than the cholera-infected London did in 1845. However, the establishment of tram and train lines allowed for broader settlement. For example, by 1861, 40% of Sydney's residents lived in suburbs. In the 1870s, the City of Sydney began slum clearance. Towards the end of the century, it and Melbourne were growing steadily, with the latter reaching the status of the 22nd largest city in the world in 1890. The two cities were comparable to other major cities of the British Empire, such as Singapore, Mumbai, and Hong Kong, becoming centres of economic activity. This boom resulted in both cities building universities, museums, stock exchanges, churches, and public parks.

=== Early 20th century ===
==== City Beautiful and the Garden City ====
Australia's rapid urbanization meant urban planning became an increasingly important issue, with the early decades of the century characterised by political, civic and academic discussion around the coordinated planning and administration of rapidly growing metropolitan regions. Early town planners focused on the orderly planning of cities, closely following international contemporary town planning and urban reform movements (especially from the UK), where urban planning aimed to improve urban health, efficiency and aesthetics. Critiques of existing urban design began to emerge, with John Sulman and others critiquing the grid pattern. City improvement also made an impact, with Melbourne for example having begun street tree planting in the 1880s. Outside the inner-city, model suburbs also became fashionable, one example being Annandale. Furthermore, railways allowed residential-only suburbs with gardens to be developed.

Both European and North American cities provided models for the Australian City Beautiful movement. A combination of elements about 1900 also influenced the movement:

- It was thought that Australia, being a country that was relatively newly settled by Europeans, had wasted an opportunity to design cities comprehensively and aesthetically.
- Australian cities were seen as lacking beauty and civic pride.
- The lack of architectural features, and extensive street advertising, were also concerns. This was attributed to “materialism, apathy, short-sightedness, political interference and indifference”.
- Utopian city plans were another influence on the Australian City Beautiful movement. A better Brisbane, for example, was described by Louis Esson and illustrated by Lloyd Rees with a Parisian influence.

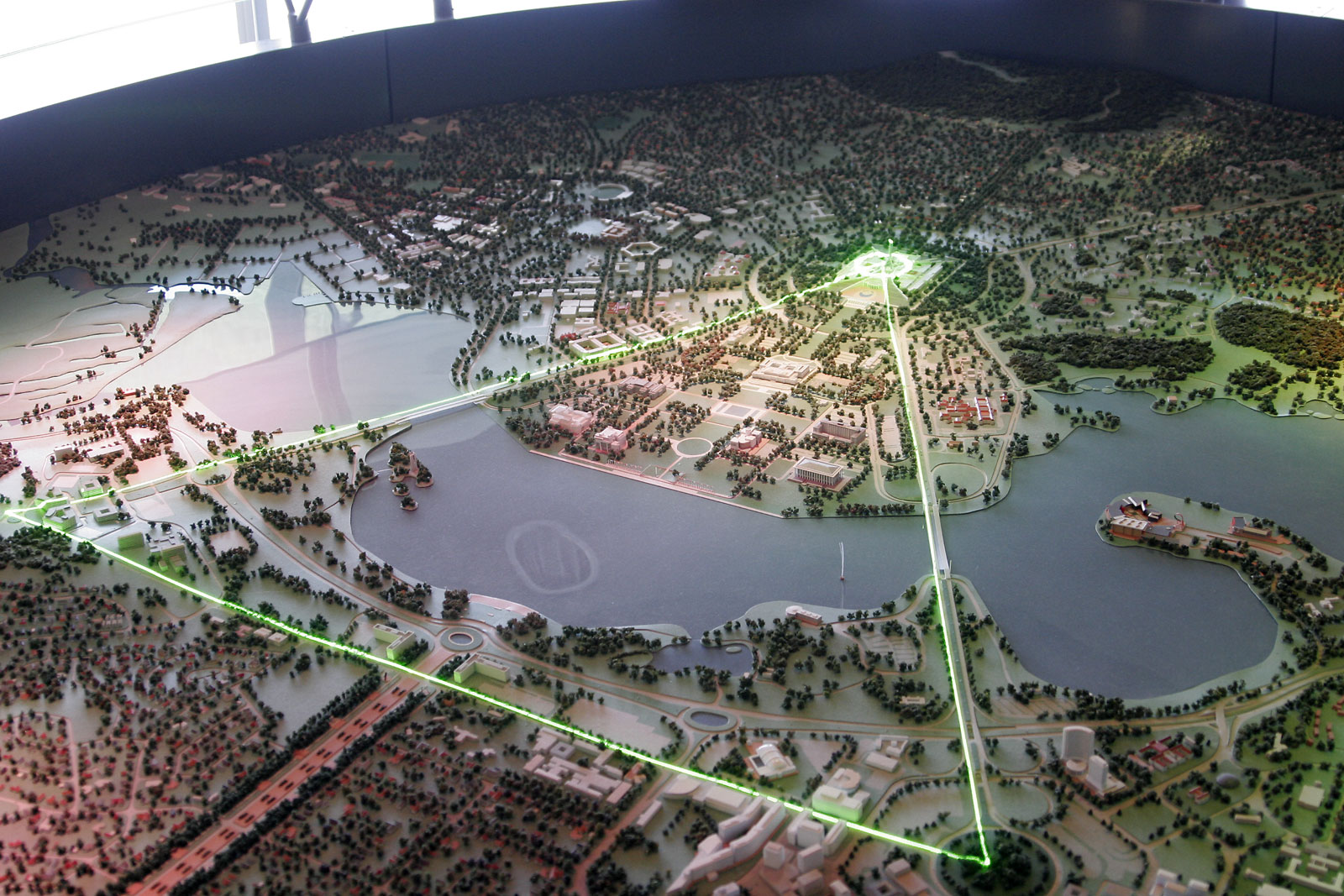
A model of Griffins triangle from his plan for Canberra

The concern with civic improvement was expressed in many ways, with citizen groups forming in Australian cities to advocate healthier, more beautiful cities. In Sydney, this desire to improve planning found its expression through a Royal Commission into the improvement of Sydney and its suburbs, which commenced in 1908, focusing on transportation, slum clearance, the future growth of Sydney, and aesthetics. The Garden City movement, founded by Ebenezer Howard in the UK, was also influential and was adopted as a design strategy in several areas of Australian cities (such as in Daceyville in south eastern Sydney).

Walter Burley Griffin incorporated City Beautiful principles for his design for Canberra. Griffin was influenced by Washington “with grand axes and vistas and a strong central focal point” with specialised centres and, being a landscape architect, used the landscape to complement this layout. John Sulman, however, was Australia's "leading proponent" of the City Beautiful movement and, in 1921, wrote the book An Introduction to Australian City Planning. Both the City Beautiful and the Garden City philosophies were represented by Sulman’s “geometric or contour controlled” designs of the circulatory road systems in Canberra. The widths of pavements were also reduced and vegetated areas were increased, such as planted road verges.

==== Urban reform movement ====
During this era there were two main approaches to urban reform: a movement towards the creation of a legal framework for town planning, and efforts towards creating large metropolitan governments, known as the "greater city movement". Height regulations were passed by New South Wales in 1912 and Melbourne in 1916. The efforts of those advocating for legislative changes led to the establishment of town planning commissions in Sydney (1922), Melbourne (1923) and Perth (1928), and the enactment of the first planning legislation in Australia. These commissions were important developments in the history of Australian town planning, but were ultimately ineffective in achieving town planning objectives.

The greater city movements of Australia led to the creation of a greater Brisbane (1925), with smaller and more limited successes in Newcastle (1938) and Perth (1914–1917). However, elsewhere the movement was entirely unsuccessful, and following World War II, progress towards metropolitan planning was achieved through the creation of statutory planning agencies under the direction of the state governments. Today, the idea of a single metropolitan municipal government coordinating development and infrastructure is seen as a largely discredited model of urban and regional planning.

=== Post World War II period (1945+) ===
External videos
- Traffic Jam Problem In Australia (1965)

Australian cities and urban centres, particularly capital cities, experienced significant growth after World War II, which was largely driven by a combination of rapid economic expansion, high birth rates and unparalleled levels of immigration, particularly from western Europe and, from the 1970s, south east Asia. Furthermore, increasing ownership of the motor car, combined with cheap fuel, resulted in an explosion in the urban form of many Australian urban centres. Many cities were rapidly transformed from modest, medium density centres, supported by public transport, to a suburban, car dominated city with large, residential dormitory suburbs. As a consequence, population and land use become increasingly dispersed. For example, in 1840 40% of Sydney's residents lived in suburbs, while by the 1960s this figure had risen to over 70%.

=== Metropolitan planning ===
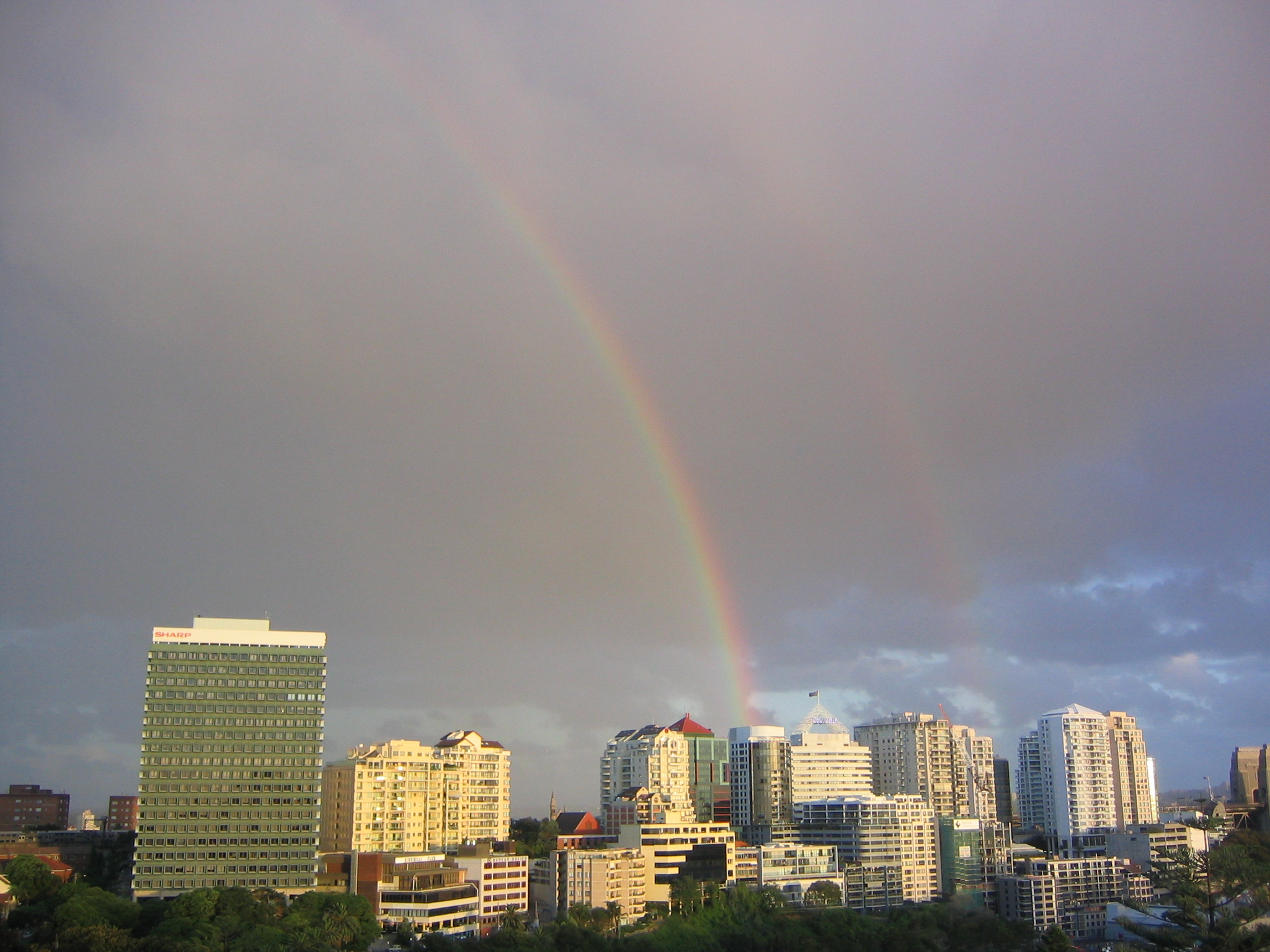
Public housing (left) and apartments in Sydney

Australia's long period of post war economic growth resulted in Federal and State governments developing metropolitan plans in an attempt to address some of the negative aspects associated with urban growth. Typically, many capital cities engaged in creating metropolitan wide spatial plans to guide development over long periods of up to 20 years or more. Particular focus was given to land release on the Rural-urban fringe, establishing a hierarchy of urban centres, the construction of new public housing estates and a preference towards building car based infrastructure (such as new highways, etc.). Examples include the Sydney County of Cumberland Plan of 1948 (regarded as the first metropolitan plan for Sydney) and the Sydney Region Outline Plan of 1968.

From the early 1970s the Australian Federal Government became directly involved in urban policy with the Whitlam Labour government establishing for the first time a federal Department of Urban and Regional Development. Federal government involvement included taking care of sewage servicing backlogs in major metropolitan centres, the establishment of growth centres and new towns to foster de-centralization, funding infrastructure and public housing.

== Australian planning frameworks ==
Urban planning in Australia is a distinct, defined profession, represented by a peak industry group called the Planning Institute of Australia. Similarly, urban planning activities in Australia are codified in law, with a significant body of legislation and case law guiding planning principles and decisions.

Australia's federal system of governance, the nationwide Australian Government, the six states and two territories have their own urban planning laws and procedures resulting in separate systems of planning and land use management, including separate administrative departments that oversee and regulate planning and land use activities. Consequently, there is no single urban planning system for Australia – rather, there are a number of planning systems that operate largely independently of each other along state based lines.

=== Australian Federal Government ===
Urban planning is not specifically referred to in the Constitution of Australia as a Federal Government responsibility. Nevertheless, the Federal Government is increasingly playing a role in the urban planning process in Australia, mainly through the regulation of development on areas that are of national environmental significance, or through actual development activities on federal land. Examples of this are where the Federal Government has actively sought to provide strategic guidance and direction in urban policy, starting with the Whitlam Labour Government in the early 1970s, the Building Better Cities Program of the mid-1990s, and, most recently, with the release of a National Urban Policy in 2011. The National Urban Policy was released by the Minister for Infrastructure in 2011 and establishes for the first time the Australian Government's overarching goals for the nation's cities and how to make them more productive and sustainable.

The principal piece of Commonwealth legislation impacting urban planning decisions is the Environment Protection and Biodiversity Conservation Act 1999 which establishes a framework for assessing impacts on threatened species of national significance, World Heritage Sites, nuclear actions, and national heritage places, amongst other considerations.

== Urban Planning Frameworks by State and Territory ==
Each state and territory have their own specified legislation for the provision of urban planning and relevant controls that sees fit with the government of the day's policies.

State / Territory	Planning framework	Land use regulation
ACT	Territory Plan 2008	Land Use Policy
NT	Planning Act	Planning Scheme
NSW	Environmental Planning and Assessment Act 1979	Local Environmental Plans (LEP)
QLD	Sustainable Planning Act 2009 repealed. Planning Act 2016	Planning Schemes
SA	Planning, Development and Infrastructure Act 2016	Development Plan
TAS	Land Use Planning and Approvals Act 1993	Planning Schemes
VIC	Planning and Environment Act 1987	Planning Schemes
WA	Planning and Development Act 2005	Planning Schemes

=== New South Wales ===
The first planning legislation in New South Wales was only passed in 1945 with the Local Government (Town and Country Planning) Amendment Act 1945. Following this, in 1974 the Planning and Environment Commission Act established a commission to improve the planning system. The Environmental Planning and Assessment Act 1979 (EP&A Act) was consequently passed. The same period also saw the passing of the Heritage Act of 1977 and the Land and Environmental Court Act of 1979.

The EP&A Act establishes a number of key planning considerations in NSW, including:

- The role of the Minister for Planning in NSW, as well as the administrative functions of the New South Wales Department of Planning;
- Strategic plan making functions, either through a State Environmental Planning Policy, Local Environmental Plan or Development Control Plan;
- Environmental assessment functions: and
- The role of the Greater Sydney Commission.

In addition to the legislative framework governing land use and urban planning in New South Wales, the Minister for Planning, through the Department of Planning and Infrastructure, publishes a Metropolitan Plan for Sydney, along with Regional Strategies for the Far North Coast, Mid North Coast, Lower Hunter, Illawarra, Sydney to Canberra Corridor, and Murray regions. Whilst not provided for explicitly in the EP&A Act, these strategic planning documents provide a basis for more detailed planning at the Local Government Council, and sub-regional levels (especially in the Sydney Metropolitan Area).

Local environmental plans are the principal planning instrument, crafted by local government areas, with zoning providing the framework for land use. An online map service shows all the development zones and controls in New South Wales.

Given that urban planning in NSW is codified through specific legislation, there is a dedicated Land and Environment Court of New South Wales to deal with urban planning disputes. Typically, these most urban planning cases heard by the Land and Environment Court deal with development assessment matters.

=== Victoria ===
In Victoria, urban planning policies and controls fall under the Planning and Environment Act 1987 which is currently administered by the Department of Transport and Planning and the Minister for Planning. The Act sets out the jurisdiction for key planning considerations such as:

- The role of the Minister and the key responsibilities in administering the Planning and Environment Act 1987
- The Victorian Planning Provisions and Planning Schemes, which aim to provide a consistent framework for land use and development in municipalities such as Zoning and Overlay conditions
- Mechanisms for permit applications, dispute resolution and amendments inter alia

Planning Schemes set out the premises of community interaction and proposals with land use and development. Through zoning and overlays, applications must align with the policies set out by local government areas who in turn prepare schemes around state policies.

In addition, the Minister, the Department of Environment, Land, Water and Planning and relevant statutory bodies such as the Victorian Planning Authority and Public Transport Victoria are able to scope strategic directions on their respective focus areas. For example, Plan for Victoria is the current long-term strategic planning outline of urban development for the state from 2025 to 2050.

The Minister is able to amend key aspects of the planning system in Victoria at their discretion and this most often seen through amendments to the planning provision and schemes as well as occasional interventions into permit applications Department of Transport and Planning.

=== Western Australia ===
In Western Australia urban planning is primarily directed by the Western Australian Planning Commission, a statutory authority of the Government of Western Australia. and implemented by the Department of Planning, Lands & Heritage and local government authorities. Key legislation is the Environmental Protection Act 1986 and the Planning and Development Act 2005.

== Challenges ==
Australia is one of the most sparsely populated countries in the world, with 17 cities of more than 100,000 people. However, 74.5 percent of the population lives in these major urban centres. All but Canberra and Toowoomba are on the coast. The population has been moving to the coast in so-called 'sea change', although more recently the popularity of exurban settlement has seen an inland movement in the so-called 'green change'. The capital cities of the states and territories are overwhelmingly primate cities. The five largest cities of Sydney, Melbourne, Brisbane, Perth and Adelaide contain the majority (60.8%) of urban Australians. These factors together create a host of challenges to planning in Australia.

=== Population growth and demographic change ===
Population growth and demographic change is a key consideration for Australian urban planning. According to projections from the Australian Bureau of Statistics and the Department of the Treasury (Australia) it is anticipated that Australia's population will continue growing and will reach 35 million by 2050. It is estimated that 72% of this growth will occur in cities. The Department of the Treasury produced an Intergenerational Report in 2010 which predicts that there will be 8.1 million Australians over the age of 65 years by 2050. This compares to 2.6 million in 2006. This prediction for an aging population in Australia is attributed to low fertility rates and increasing life expectancy.

At the same time it is predicted that households will increase from 7.4 million in 2001 to 10.2 million in 2026 while decline of household size is expected from 2.6 in 2001 to 2.3 in 2026. The composition and size of households varies across Australian cities. A significant proportion of population growth since 2000 has been attributed to overseas immigration to Australia. In 2007–08 the Australian Bureau of Statistics data records that migration contributed 60% of population growth. Long term migration to Australia has meant that 24% of the population was born overseas. The majority of these migrants live in the major cities.

As well as overseas migration some cities are also experiencing internal movement. In 2007–08 New South Wales experienced a net loss of 19,831 whereas Queensland had a net gain of 18,388.

The structure of households within urban cities in Australia has also changed. There is an increasing trend towards couple only, lone parent and single person households with only a marginal increase in parents with children. Despite the trend towards smaller households Australian cities still showed growth in couples with children that was above the overall Australian average. Consequently, cities are still the place where the next generation Australian will be raised.

These demographic changes, in particular the population ageing and increase in smaller households, is leading to a greater demand in urban planning for housing and also different types of housing overall. Some metropolitan areas are experiencing housing shortages, particularly with regards to the provision of affordable accommodation. It is also placing pressure on housing affordability where there is only a single income.

=== Sustainability ===
Trends in population growth, transport emissions, energy usage, waste management, urban development, rainfall patterns and extreme weather events (such as droughts, heat waves, severe storms, bushfires, extensive flooding) are highlighting the need for increasing focus on sustainability in Australian cities.

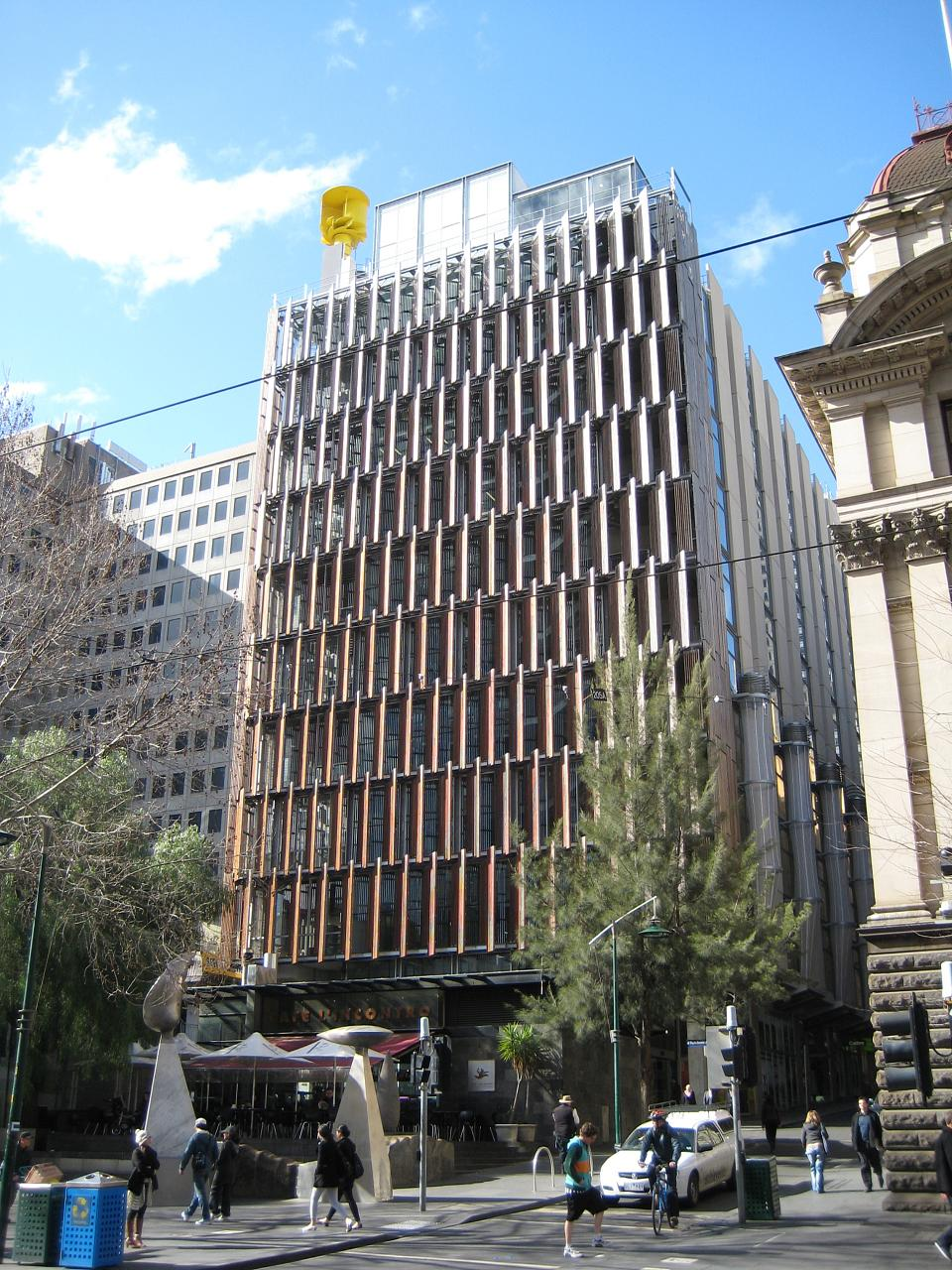
Council House 2, Melbourne, an example of sustainable design

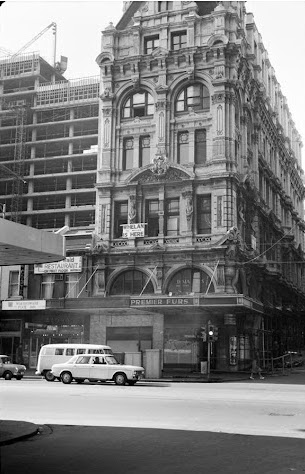
Town Hall Chambers, the building that stood where Council House 2 stands, on the corner of Little Collins and Swanston Street under demolition in 1968. Australians have lamented the loss and destruction of Melbourne's Victorian boom era buildings.

Transport emissions have been reported as one of strongest areas of emissions growth in Australia, which is a consequence of the distance separating many land uses, and of the underlying low density form of many Australian metropolitan areas. Private car use has continued to increase which is leading to greater levels of city congestion and urban air quality challenges. The cost of congestion to the Australia economy was estimated at $9.4 billion in 2005 with a prediction of a rise in cost to $20 billion by 2020 unless the issue is addressed.

Research indicates that while the total levels of key pollutants in cities has fallen over the last ten years as a result of improved fuel and emissions standards, particulate air pollution and ozone levels remain above the national air quality standard.

Rates of recycling nationally have increased, however waste generation has also increased over the period 2002–03 to 2006–07 by 31%. This exceeds the population increase of 5.6% over the same period. As a result, this has placed pressure on governments to adequate plan for landfill and associated waste management facilities in metropolitan areas.

Data on rainfall patterns in eastern and southwest Australia, where the major cities are located, indicates a decline in the annual rate of rainfall per decade of up to 50 mm since 1950. This is providing challenges in terms of both availability and the quality of water supplies, particularly when combined with population growth.

At the planning level basic aspects of sustainable housing design such as raising density, mixed use, promoting mixed use development, and encouraging transit oriented development to increase trips made by public transport have been progressively adopted as policy responses in Australian cities.

Sustainable building codes such as the Victoria's Green Star (Australia) rating and New South Wales' BASIX sustainability assessment tool are being applied to new developments to improve energy and water conservation at the individual building scale.

Further improvements in waste, water, energy and onsite food production are being progressively seen as a necessary and significant part of planning for urban sustainability in Australian cities.

=== Water sensitive urban design ===
Water-sensitive urban design (WSUD) has evolved to become a framework for integrating the management of urban water within the practice of sustainable urban design in Australia. Water sensitive design aims to ensure that the management of urban water occurs with sensitivity towards natural water systems and the broader ecosystem that the water systems support.

Within the frame-work planners consider:

- protecting natural systems and water quality through filtration and retention and removal of pollutants close to their source;
- integration of the potable drinking water covering both the piped system from catchments outside the urban area as well as water itself treated to drinking water standard;
- sewerage which encompasses the pipe system for handling the collection and transport of wastewater to treatment plants; and
- Integrated storm water drainage and treatment/re-use as part of the urban landscape.

WSUD incorporates planning and design as it relates to the building and landscape architecture on site and also in the context of wider local and regional initiatives.

=== Urban renewal and consolidation ===
Urban renewal and consolidation is changing the character of Australian cities. Planning strategies have focused on containing the outward physical sprawl of cities whilst at the same time emphasis has been placed on redeveloping the inner city and older employment zones as new residential spaces.

A new inner urban city middle class has emerged which has driven the renovation and restoration of the housing stock formally owned by older inner city working class communities. The transformation of these areas has predominantly seen the end of these areas being viewed as places of social disadvantage.

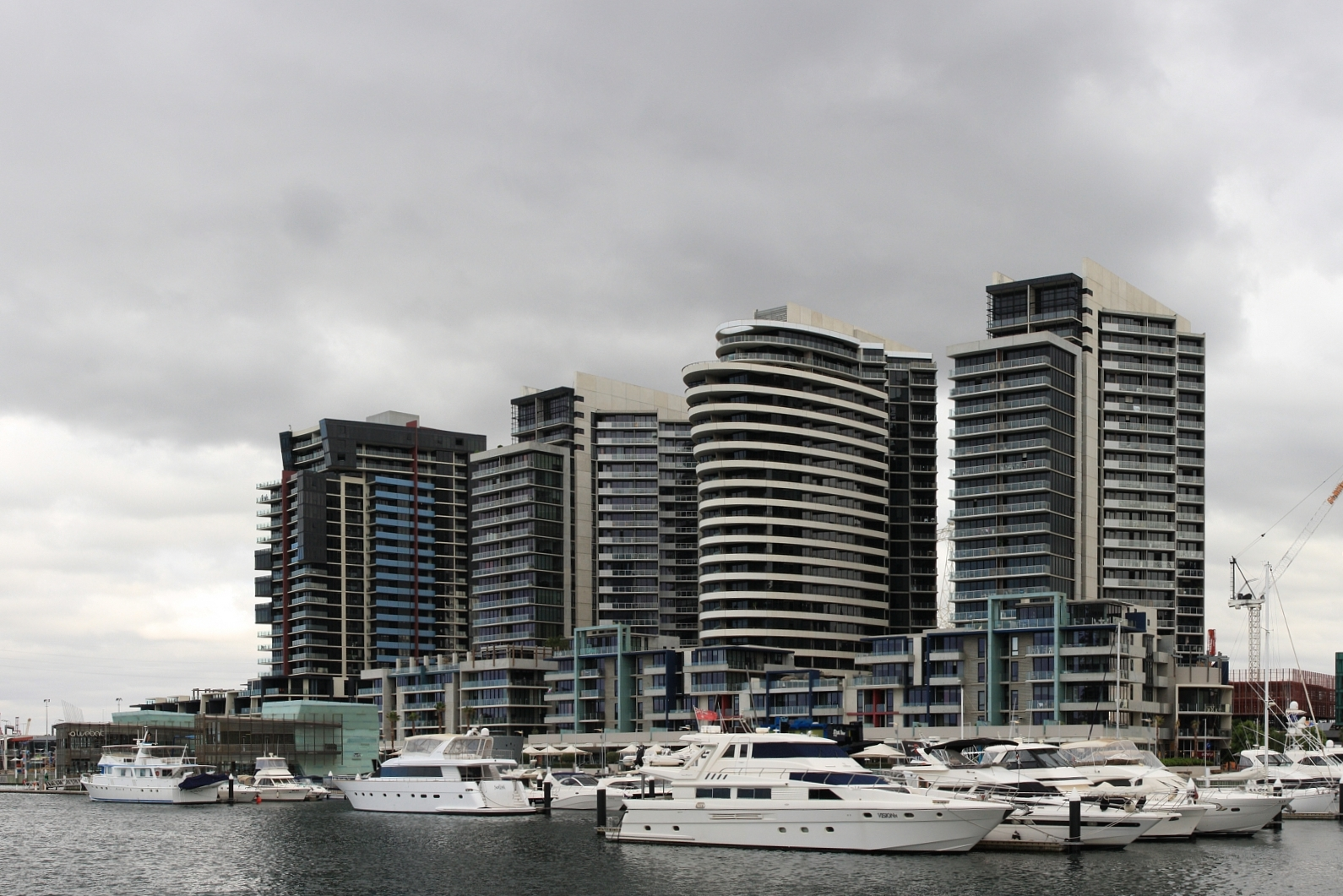
Melbourne docklands development, 2009

In parallel to the renovation of the housing stock there has also been a revitalization of disused industrial and commercial spaces such as warehouses and docklands and these have been transformed into new residential, commercial and recreational spaces often with high density development. Examples include the Docklands development in Melbourne, Green Square, Victoria Park and Barrangaroo in Sydney and South Bank in Brisbane.

High density living in Australian cities is limited to the inner urban cores of major metropolitan areas, and is substantially less dense than comparable cities in Asia and Europe. Typically most urban housing development focused on a single one level house (although this is changing) on a separate block of land. There has been a small amount of low rise apartments in inner city areas since the 1930s but this started to change since the introduction of Strata Title legislation in the 1960s. The Strata Title legislation enabled individuals to own individual apartments in a multi-apartment block on a single piece of land. Before this apartment blocks were predominantly owned as a single property by landlords.

The introduction of Strata Titles also enabled easier financing arrangements for individuals wishing to purchase a single apartment. Strata titles cover both apartments as well as attached dwellings such as town houses where these have been developed on a single title of land.

Once introduced Strata Titling facilitated the redevelopment, particularly in valuable areas or often close to transport infrastructure, of older housing on larger pieces of land which were replaced with apartment blocks.

Going forward this style of higher density housing is expected to play a large part in meeting housing needs for the changing demographics of an aging population and smaller households in Australian cities. For example, the Sydney Metropolitan Plan 2036 has a growth target of 70% of all new housing to be in the existing urban footprint, with 80% of all housing to be within a 20-minute commute of a major centre. To facilitate this, the Minister for Planning in NSW released an Urban Renewal Planning Policy to specifically deliver urban renewal in key sites in the Sydney Metropolitan area. Several urban renewal projects are planned and underway in Sydney, with the NSW Government unveiling the Greater Sydney Region Plan in 2018 which identifies urban renewal corridors and a vision for three metropolitan cities.

=== Climate change ===
Climate change is an important factor in the decision making process for urban planning in Australia because of the highly urbanised population prone to extreme weather patterns. Australia's urban areas are susceptible to changes in the climate because of the physical construction of the built environment, infrastructure, and its ecological correlation with the urban ecosystem. Over 80% of the Australian population lives in the coastal area of Australia and many on the fringe of bush land and rivers making them vulnerable to the effects of climate change. These effects include sea level rise, increased storm surges resulting in coastal erosion, strong winds, intense rainfall causing flash flooding and bushfires due to increased temperatures. The Australian Federal Government is in the process of developing climate adaptation and mitigation strategies along with risk assessment analysis initiatives to urban planning.

Historically urban planning has been the role of the state, regional and local governments but since December 2009 the Australian Federal Government has re-engaged in a strategic decision making process to prepare for climate change. The Department of Climate Change and Energy Efficiency (DCCEE) has developed adaption programs and risk assessments. A risk assessment has been calculated for possible effects on urban areas due to climate change and replacement values for transport, industrial, residential and commercial infrastructure runs into billions of dollars. Therefore, avoidance of future risk is the most cost-effective approach to urban planning.

The options for coastal and riverside management to deal with sea level rise and storm surges fall into three categories; "retreat", "accommodate" and "protect". "Retreat" entails relocating coastal and riverside infrastructure that are high risk of damage from extreme weather patterns, as well as designing buildings and infrastructures in new locations away from potential risk areas. "Accommodate" means adapting the existing built environments to effectively cope with the changing conditions such as Island raising through adding sand to beaches and raising infrastructure and buildings near the coast and riverside. "Protect" involves building sea walls and levees to prevent damage from storm surges and sea level rise.

There is a number of simple but effective adaptation options possible at a local scale to deal with intense rainfall and temperature rises. These include reducing impervious surfaces to allow for water infiltration, tree planting in urban areas to reduce the "heat island effect" and constructing transport facilities away from flood areas. Designing buildings with natural ventilation and building insulation will also help with increasing temperatures. While the only possible solution to bushfires might be to increase fire breaks between the houses and bush land.

=== Heritage and conservation ===
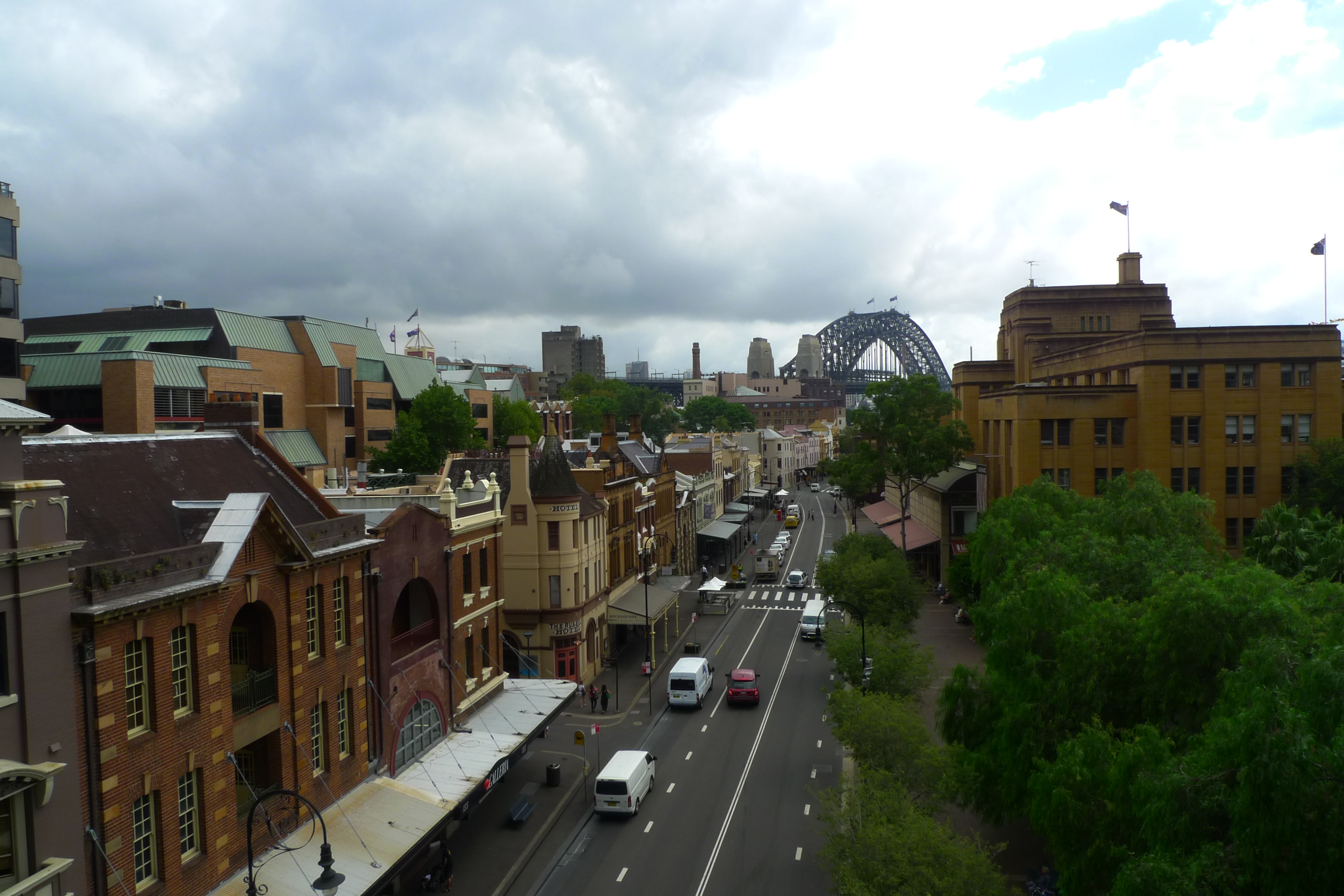
The Rocks, Sydney, 2010. The Green Ban prevented development in this area.

Politicians, planners and the community came to see the value of heritage buildings in Australia only recently in the 1970s. Laws and policies are now in place to conserve and protect historic buildings across Australia. The Green Ban is a key aspect in the initiation of these regulations especially the impact it had on proposed urban development in the city of Sydney.

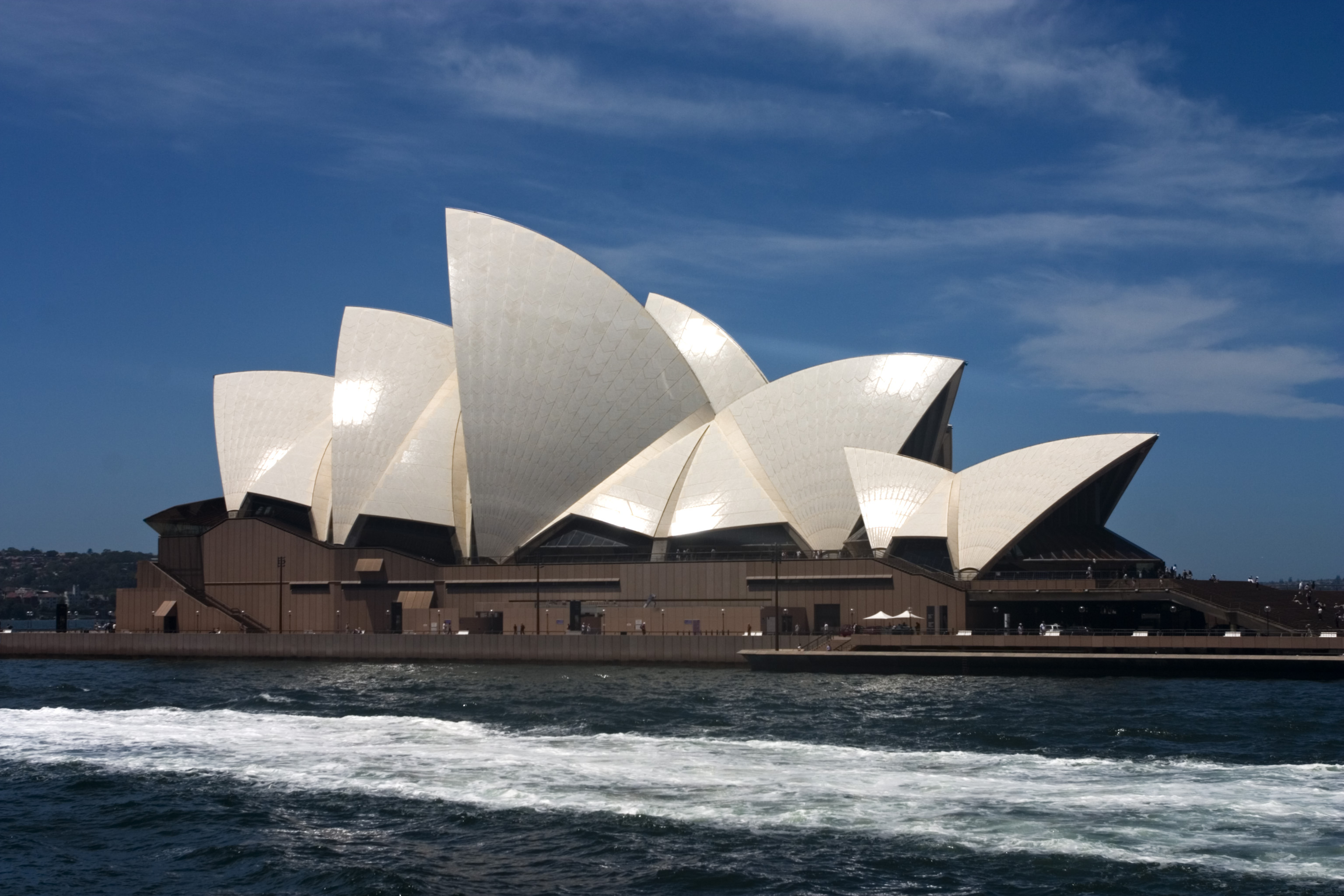
The Sydney Opera House is included on the heritage list of Australia.

In the early twentieth century there was no historic sense of preservation with regard to the built environment and people were happy to see the old replaced by the new. Then in the 1970s came the Green Bans movement imposed by builders labourers across Australia, being particularly prominent in Sydney. The Green Ban was created to defend the demolition of older style buildings that were to make way for new developments of skyscrapers, shopping precincts and luxury apartments. It was initiated by the builders labourers that were hired to construct these new buildings and was the first of its kind around the world. The key element of the movement came from the New South Wales Builders Labourers Federation (NSWBLF) which consisted of over 100 union members that belonged to the Communist Party of Australia. The most famous union leaders of the NSWBLF were Bob Pringle, Joe Owens and Jack Mundey. Many critics of the union disputed that they were denying workers employment but the union responded that they wanted to build but in a way that enhanced the built environment, such as schools and houses for the everyday person not buildings based on developers' needs. Among the 40 green bans imposed in NSW, The Rocks in Sydney was the most significant areas saved. The green ban prevented the demolition of some of the oldest buildings in Australia and beautiful foreshore parks which were going to be replaced by concrete, glass office blocks.

States and territories of Australia have since implemented heritage acts and have heritage frameworks in place to protect buildings and places of cultural significance. On a national scale in 1999 the Environment Protection and Biodiversity Conservation Act was introduced which outlines a National Heritage List (NHL). The NHL is in place to protect "exceptional natural and cultural places that contribute to Australia's national identity". Since then measurements of heritage have evolved and in 2011, there are 113 places listed of iconic heritage value to the whole of Australia, which include the Sydney Opera House, Melbourne Cricket Ground and Anzac Parade in Canberra.

Urban planning in Australia in the 21st century is subject to planning and heritage regulations. Heritage considerations may form part of the assessment process for proposed construction and development, particularly where heritage-listed or culturally significant sites are involved.

=== Community participation ===
The Australian government has begun to see community engagement in the decision making process of urban planning of fundamental importance. Due to this engagement local governments have looked for ways to design urban infrastructure in a way that helps to encourage social cohesion. However, there is still room for developing a method that uses community involvement more effectively. Community participation has also created many barriers along the way by preventing urban planning projects from proceeding.

Previously, urban planning in Australia quite often did not involve the community and projects went ahead to construct residential buildings that were crammed into small areas and did not provide space for recreation and socialising. Recently this approach has changed and planners have realised the importance of creating an urban environment that encourages social behavior among its residents. These new designs incorporate active living and recreational areas that provide for social connectivity and wellbeing. This new approach has come through feedback from the community showing the positive effects of their involvement.

In 2008, the Australian federal government headed by former Prime Minister Kevin Rudd inaugurated the Department of Infrastructure and Transport to work with the newly established Major Cities Unit (MCU) in an effort to involve the community to develop urban environments into more productive and sustainable places. From then on the MCU has been researching ways to develop policies that improve urban planning to make cities more socially inclusive and encouraging the community to actively participate in the decision making process. In May 2011 new national urban policies were released by the Minister for Infrastructure and Transport, Anthony Albanese. These policies promised to: "enhance the livability of cities by promoting better urban design, planning and affordable access to recreational, cultural and community facilities."

There is still an ongoing need to develop more effective community participation as the participants do not represent the views of the whole community and disadvantaged groups, such as poor people and minorities, often do not get a fair say in the urban planning process.

=== Integrating land use and public transport ===
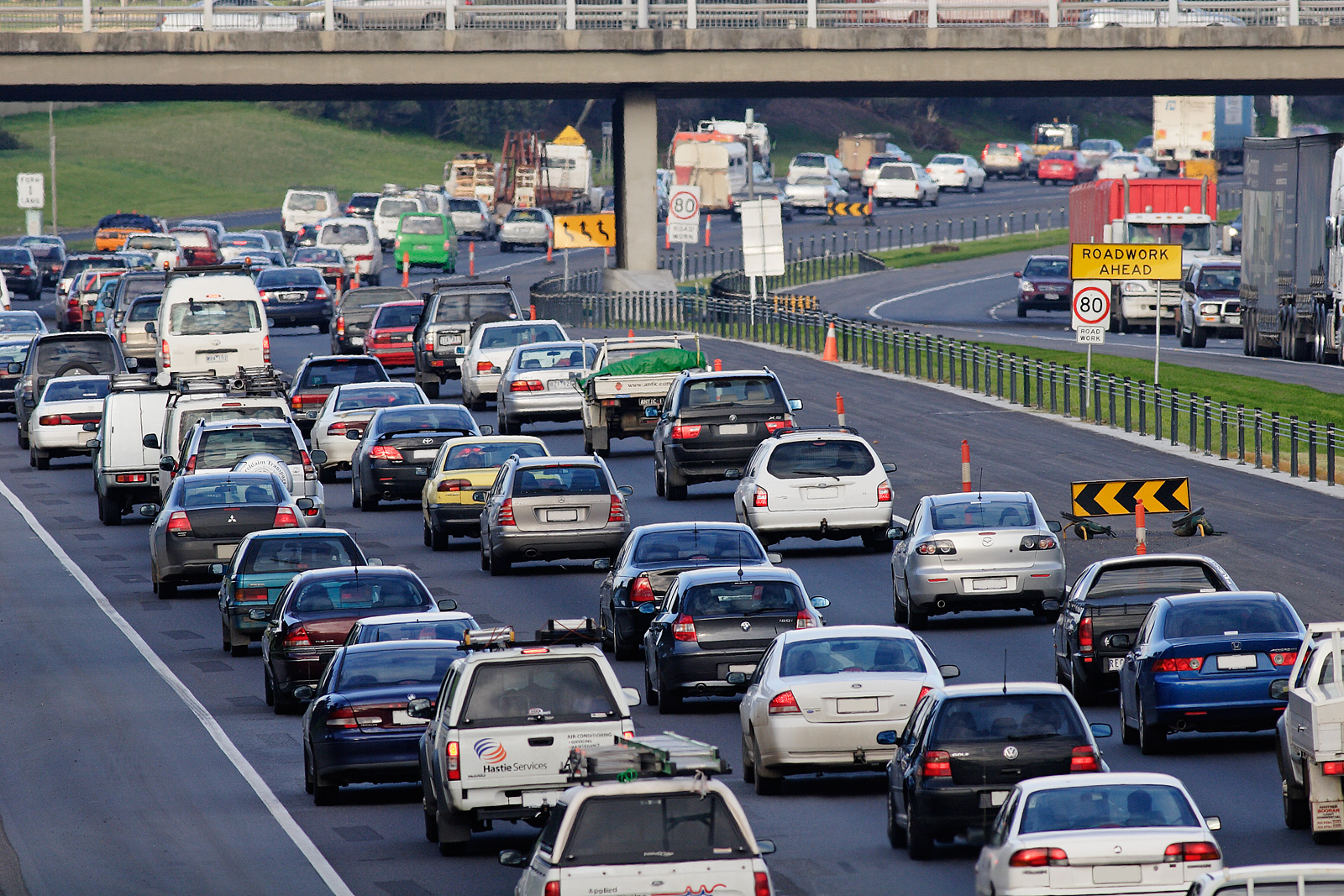
Peak hour traffic in Melbourne

Australia's urban transport system could become under increasing demand as the population grows and Australia moves to a more environmentally friendly urban system. Some of Australia's urban problems such as road congestion and pollution could be solved by the improvement of public transport, as it is a crucial aspect in creating a functional, sustainable city. The urban structure of Australian cities consists of dispersed suburbs and dense central building districts which creates immense planning challenges for decision makers. Urban planners now realise the need to integrate active and sustainable public transport with destinations accessible to alternative modes of transport such as cycling and walking to encourage people to reduce the stress of cars on the roads. The Sydney Metro is the first rapid transit system in an Australian city, comprising one line that opened in 2019, the Metro North West & Bankstown Line, and two other lines under construction, Sydney Metro West and Sydney Metro Western Sydney Airport.

Road transport contributes to 88% of all transport emissions and the cities of Australia are congested not only by automobiles but the parking lots they use. In March 2006, 75% of adults in Australian cities travelled to work or study by private automobile in comparison to 19% that used public transport and 5% that walked or cycled. Reducing private automobile dependence will improve the pollution problem and free up land to build more needed infrastructure such as schools, houses and hospitals. To encourage Australians to use public transport research suggests it should be more efficient (timely, reliable, and accessible) and affordable.

The Australian Transport Council has found that the current networks of buses and trains in Australian cities need to be integrated with effective land use. At the moment buses and trains run along the same routes competing with each other. Ideally trains are used to travel long distances, with a high passenger capacity and avoid the traffic signals. Buses should be in place as an intermediary for fast inner city train networks and for passengers to access surrounding suburbs not suitable for trains. Land use integration would mean that urban planners design infrastructure around public transport to enable the public to have access to transport within close walking distance from their home or work. Some urban planners and policy makers think there is a need to remove car parks, build upon current transport infrastructure to create a more efficient system that facilitates urban regeneration.

== See also ==
- Public housing in Australia
- Urbanization in Australia

== Notes ==
123123123
