= Municipality of Victoria Park =

Former local government area in Perth, Western Australia

- local government area
- Country: Australia
- State: Western Australia
- Seat: Victoria Park

Area
  - Total: 17 km^{2} (6.6 sq mi)

Population (1897)
  - Total: 1,197

The Municipality of Victoria Park was a local government area in the inner eastern suburbs of Perth, Western Australia.

It was first established as the Victoria Park Road District on 17 May 1894. The first election was held on 9 July 1894.

The road board was reconstituted as the Municipality of Victoria Park on 30 April 1897. It had, at that time, an area of 4,198 acres, a population of 1,197 and 350 dwellings. The reconstituted municipality consisted of a chairman and six councillors, with two auditors, increasing to nine councillors in 1898 due to a rising population. The municipal boundaries were extended on 27 April 1900.

The municipality built a town hall on Albany Highway as their new headquarters in 1899, opening on 11 September that year. It remained a meeting and function venue for many years afterwards, but was demolished in 1983.

In 1904, the municipality signed an agreement with Perth Electric Tramways Ltd to extend the tramway line into Victoria Park, with the council raising a loan for the construction of the line and the company paying the council to operate it, with the intention of the company taking the line over when the cost of construction had been repaid. The agreement saw the tramway successfully extended into the suburb, and instead of being taken over by the company, the municipality sold the tramway to the state government in 1913 for £5,212.

The council was divided up into wards on 22 December 1904, with three wards (East, Central and West) each having three councillors.

Under the influence of W.E. Bold and his vision for a greater Perth, the municipality ceased to exist on 1 November 1917 when it was amalgamated into the City of Perth under the City of Perth Amendment Act 1917, forming the new three-member Victoria Park Ward of the City of Perth. The amalgamation had been amicable, supported by both councils as well as receiving support from Victoria Park ratepayers at a referendum on 22 November 1916.

== Chairmen and Mayors ==
The following people served as chairman of the road board or mayors of the municipality:

=== Chairmen of the Victoria Park Road District ===
- F. G. Williams (1894-1895)
- D. J. Garland (1896)
- R. T. McMaster (1897)

=== Mayors of the Municipality of Victoria Park ===
- R. T. McMaster (1897)
- A. G. Russell (1897-1903)
- J. C. Milligan (1903-1905)
- R. T. McMaster (1906-1907)
- H. G. Duncan (1908)
- Charles Harper (1909-1912)
- J. Rushton (1913-1915)
- Charles Harper (1916-1917)
