= Charles Harper (mayor) =

Lord Mayor of Perth

Charles Harper (c. 1875 – 1954) was a Western Australian businessman and mayor of two local governments. Harper was a councillor of the Municipality of Victoria Park from 1905 and served as Mayor from 1909 to 1917 when the municipality was amalgamated into the City of Perth. From 1937 to 1939 he served as Lord Mayor of Perth.

He came to Perth from Melbourne and 1895, and later established a business, Charles Harper and Co., situated in Cremorne Arcade between Hay Street and Murray Street in the city. The company were importers of musical instruments including pianos and organs.

Harper died in 1954.

Harper Street in Burswood (now in the Town of Victoria Park) was named after him.
