= List of acts of the Parliament of Western Australia from 1928 =

This is a list of acts of the Parliament of Western Australia for the year 1928.

== 1928 ==
=== Public acts ===
Short title, or popular name	Citation	Royal assent
Long title
Financial Agreement Act 1928	No. 1 of 1928	30 August 1928
An Act to approve an Agreement between the Commonwealth of Australia and the States of New South Wales, Victoria, Queensland, South Australia, Western Australia, and Tasmania concerning the adjustment of the Financial relations between the Commonwealth and the States, and for purposes incidental thereto.
	No. 1 of 1928 (Session 2)	20 August 1928
An Act to apply out of the Consolidated Revenue Fund the sum of Eight Hundred and Fifty Thousand Pounds, and from Moneys to Credit of the General Loan Fund Seven Hundred and Fifty Thousand Pounds and from Moneys to Credit of the Government Property Sales Fund Ten Thousand Five Hundred Pounds, to the Service of the Year ending 30th June, 1929, and to apply out of the Public Account the sum of Three Hundred Thousand Pounds for the purposes of temporary Advances to be made by the Treasurer.
	No. 4 of 1928	29 September 1928
An Act to apply out of the Consolidated Revenue Fund the sum of Eight Hundred and Fifty Thousand Pounds, and from Moneys to Credit of the General Loan Fund Three Hundred and Fifty Thousand Pounds, and from Moneys to Credit of the Government Property Sales Fund Fifty Thousand Pounds to the Service of the Year ending 30th June, 1929.
Kulja Eastward Railway Act 1928	No. 6 of 1928	20 October 1928
An Act to authorise the Construction of a Railway from Kulja Eastward.
Lake Grace–Karlgarin Railway Act 1928	No. 23 of 1928	27 December 1928
An Act to authorise the Construction of a Railway from Lake Grace to Karlgarin.
Town Planning and Development Act 1928	No. 39 of 1928	28 December 1928
An Act relating to the Planning and Development of Land for Urban, Suburban, and Rural purposes.
	No. X of 1928	
Coal Mines Regulation Act Amendment Act 1928	No. 44 of 1928	28 December 1928
An Act to amend the Coal Mines Regulation Act, 1902-1926. (Note: Coal Mines Regulation Act 1902 (1 & 2 Edw. VII. No. 25))

=== Private acts ===
Short title, or popular name	Citation	Royal assent
Long title
Texas Company (Australasia) Limited (Private) Act 1928	Private Act of 1928	28 December 1928
An Act to grant to the Texas Company (Australasia) Limited, powers and provisions for the Storage and Supply of Oil, Liquid Fuel, Petroleum Spirits, Kerosene and Petroleum Products, and for other purposes.

== Sources ==
- "legislation.wa.gov.au".
