= Bold Park =

Urban bushland area in City Beach, Western Australia

Coordinates: 31.946°S 115.771°E

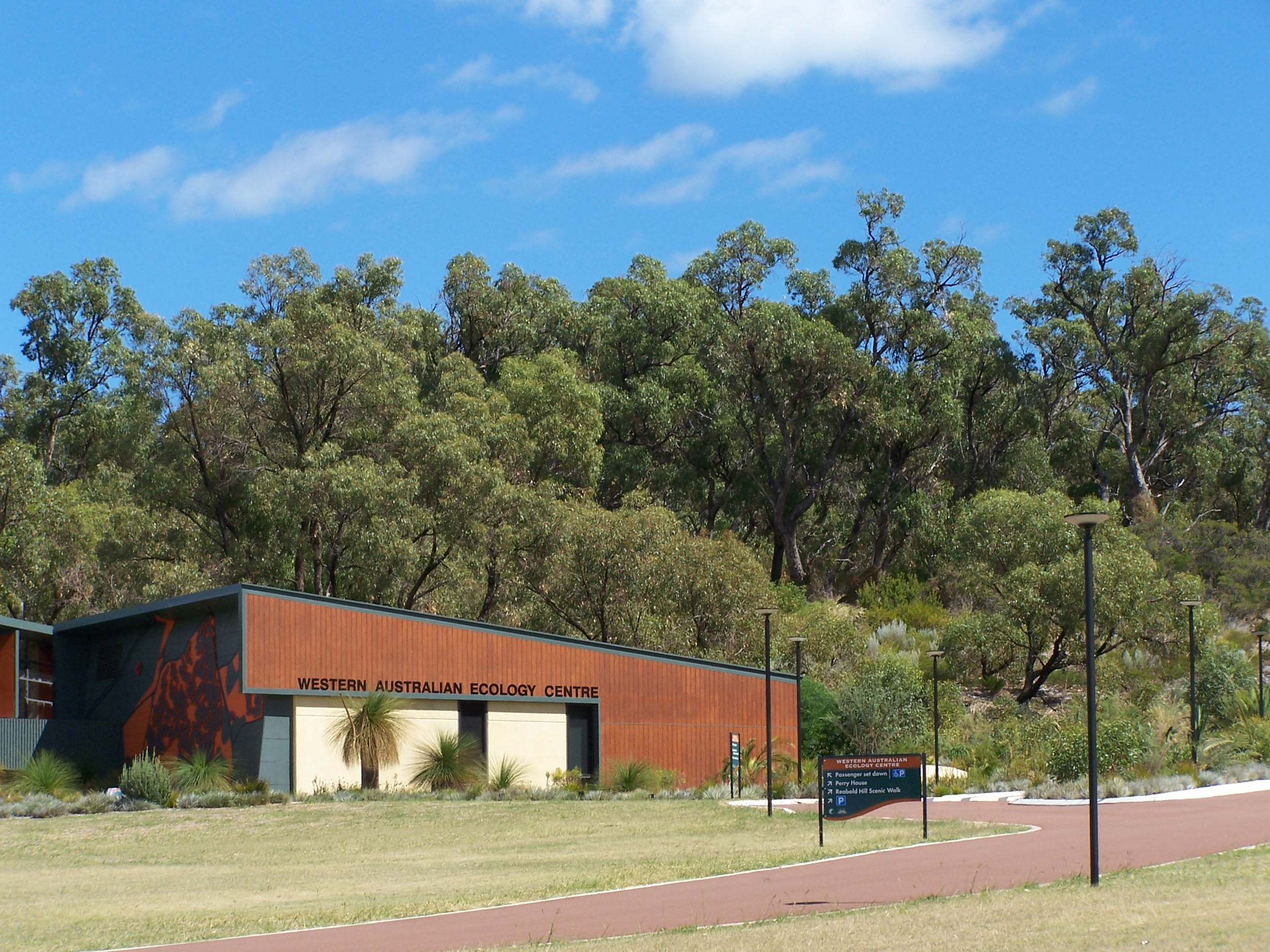
Western Australian Ecology Centre at Bold Park with Reabold Hill behind

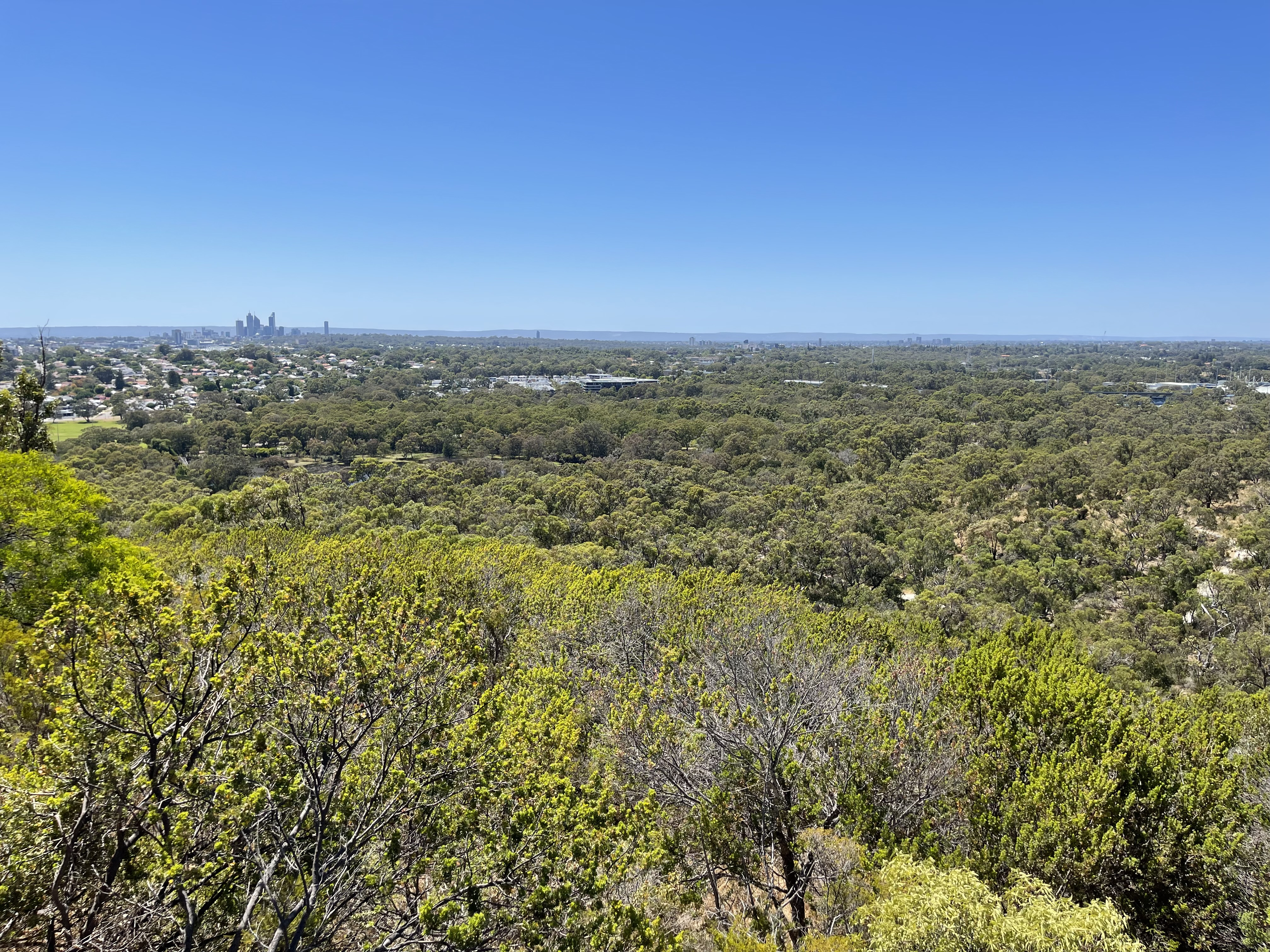
View from Reabold Hill, Perth CBD at left

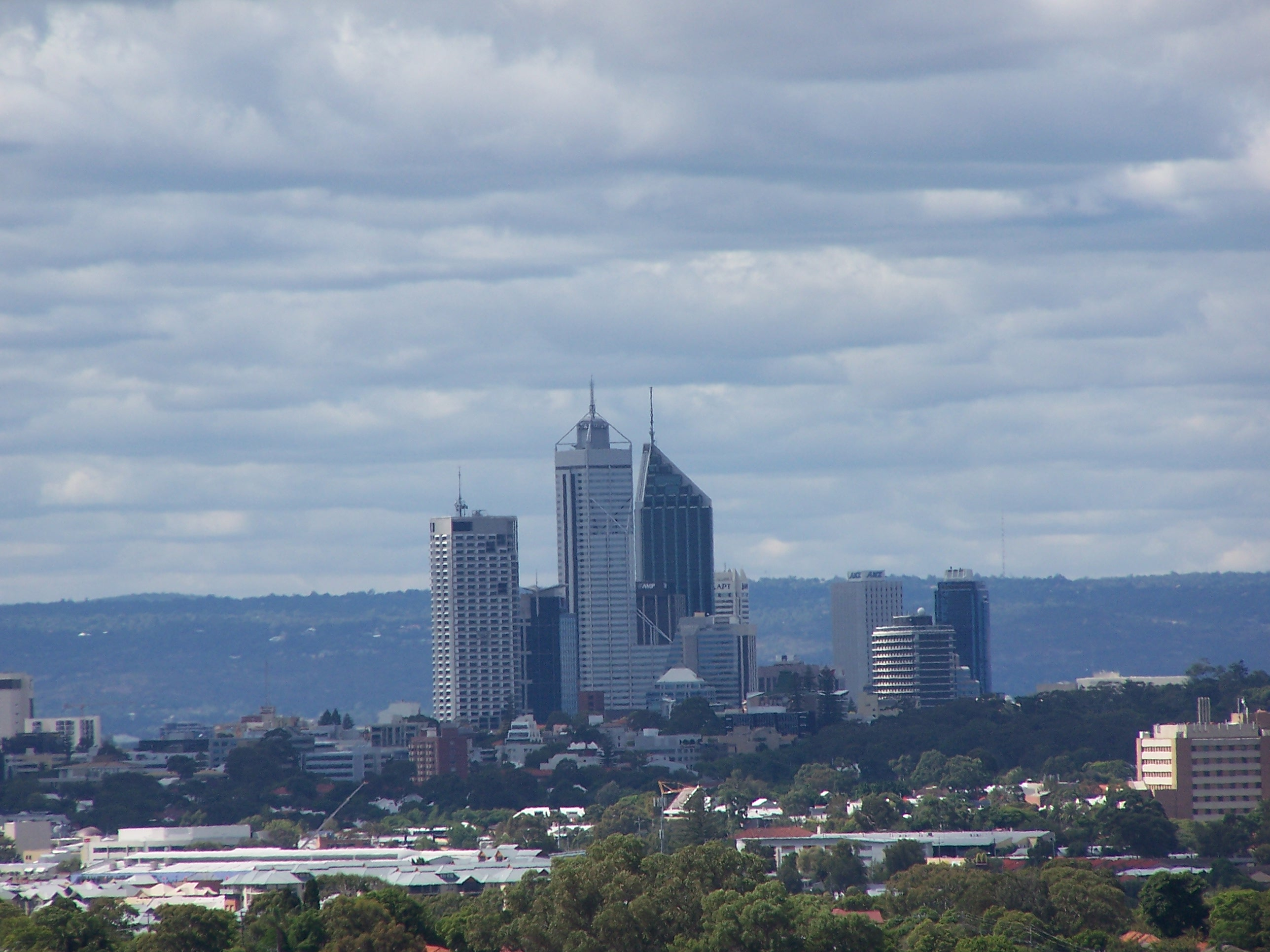
Perth CBD as seen from Reabold Hill in Bold Park in 2006

Bold Park is a 437-hectare (1,080-acre) urban bushland area around Reabold Hill in the suburb of City Beach, in Perth, Western Australia. It is located 8 kilometres (5 mi) directly west of the Perth central business district (CBD), its western border less than one kilometre (0.62 mi) from the Indian Ocean. To the east, Perry Lakes reserve is directly adjacent to the park. The hilly topography allows views of both the city and ocean.

Bold Park is situated near the Indian Ocean, west of the Perth central business district.

== History ==
The Perth City Council established Bold Park in 1936 around Reabold Hill, "the highest natural point in the metropolitan area on the Swan Coastal Plain." The park was named after William Ernest Bold on 14 November 1944, who served as town clerk from 1900 to 1944 (the longest serving town clerk in the council's history). Similarly, Reabold Hill was named after Francis Rea, former mayor of the City of Perth, and Bold.

Bold Park is located on a calcareous coastal plain. Limestone formations in the park were quarried to provide stone for the growing population of Perth. The 640-person-capacity Quarry Amphitheatre uses quarry walls for acoustics and shelter.

Bold Park was recognised as an A-class reserve on 10 August 1998. Since 2000, the Botanic Gardens and Parks Authority (BGPA) has managed Bold Park (along with the 406-hectare Kings Park). Frequent fires, recreational activities and weed invasion have plagued Perth's urban bushland areas. The Bold Park Environmental Management Plan (2000–2005) committed the BGPA to restoring the park.

Bold Park Reservoir is situated on the western edge of the park, off Kalinda Drive.

== Sources ==
- Bold Park (n.d.). Hilltop History: Watching over Perth (Information board). Reabold Hill Summit Boardwalk: Bold Park. "In 1917 Reabold Hill was named after Francis Rea, former City of Perth Mayor, and William Bold the longest serving Town Clerk for the City of Perth. It is the highest natural point in the metropolitan area on the Swan Coastal Plain."
