= List of acts of the Parliament of Western Australia from 2005 =

This is a list of acts of the Parliament of Western Australia for the year 2005.

== 2005 ==
Short title, or popular name	Citation	Royal assent
Long title
Electoral Amendment and Repeal Act 2005	No. 1 of 2005	20 May 2005
An Act to—: amend the Electoral Act 1907 (Note: Electoral Act 1907 (No. 27)) and the Constitution Acts Amendment Act 1899; (Note: Constitution Acts Amendment Act 1899 (63 Vict. No. 19)); repeal the Electoral Distribution Act 1947; (Note: Electoral Districts Act 1947 (No. 51)) and; make consequential amendments to other Acts
Constitution and Electoral Amendment Act 2005	No. 2 of 2005	23 May 2005
An Act to amend the Constitution Acts Amendment Act 1899 and the Electoral Act 1907.
Appropriation (Consolidated Fund) Act (No. 1) 2005	No. 6 of 2005	7 July 2005
An Act to grant supply and to appropriate and apply out of the Consolidated Fund certain sums for the recurrent services and purposes of the year ending 30 June 2006.
Appropriation (Consolidated Fund) Act (No. 2) 2005	No. 7 of 2005	7 July 2005
An Act to grant supply and to appropriate and apply out of the Consolidated Fund certain sums for the capital purposes of the year ending 30 June 2006.
Standard Time Act 2005	No. 21 of 2005	15 November 2005
An Act to—: provide for standard time to be determined by reference to Co-ordinated Universal Time; repeal the Standard Time Act 1895; (Note: Standard Time Act 1895 (59 Vict. No. 2)) and; consequentially amend the Western Australian Marine (Sea Dumping) Regulations 1982.
Planning and Development Act 2005	No. 37 of 2005	12 December 2005
An Act to provide for a system of land use planning and development in the State and for related purposes.
Terrorism (Extraordinary Powers) Act 2005	No. 41 of 2005	19 December 2005
An Act to provide powers to prevent and respond to terrorist acts
	No. X of 2005	
Defamation Act 2005	No. 44 of 2005	19 December 2005
An Act to—: modify the general law relating to the tort of defamation; repeal the Libel Act 1843 (Imp), (Note: Libel Act 1843 (6 & 7 Vict. c. 96 (Imp))) Newspaper Libel and Registration Act 1884, (Note: Newspaper Libel and Registration Act 1884 (48 Vict. No. 12)) Newspaper Libel and Registration Act 1884 Amendment Act 1888 (Note: Newspaper Libel and Registration Act 1884 Amendment Act 1888 ( 52 Vict. No. 18)) and Slander of Women Act 1900; (Note: Slander of Women Act 1900 (64 Vict. No. 36)) and; amend The Criminal Code, and for other purposes.

== Sources ==
- "legislation.wa.gov.au".
