= David L. Davidson =

Western Australian urban planner

David L. Davidson was the first Town Planning Commissioner of Western Australia from 1929 until his death in 1952. He was tasked with implementing the Town Planning and Development Act of 1928 and served as Chairman of the Town Planning Board. He is remembered as a pragmatic reformer whose forceful and divisive personality hindered his effectiveness as an administrator. His career commenced in New South Wales as an engineer-surveyor associated with the Town Planning Association. After several years of high-profile advocacy for planning reform in his home state, he was appointed by the Western Australian government to implement the state's new town planning laws. Davidson came into conflict with local planning reformers, particularly William Bold, City of Perth Town Clerk and Harold Boas, chairman of the Metropolitan Town Planning Commission - potentially exacerbated by Davidson's alignment with the values of the "city functional" philosophy, in contrast to the city beautiful movement. Tensions arising from Davidson's implementation of new subdivision and planning laws let to him being charged with assault on one occasion, and subjected to media criticism that led to him launching two defamation actions against the Daily News.
