= Bold Park Reservoir =

Roofed reservoir in City Beach, Western Australia

Coordinates: 31.93235°S 115.77241°E

- Mount Kenneth Reservoir
- Location within Perth
- Interactive map of Bold Park Reservoir
- Location: City Beach, Perth
- Type: Reservoir
- Part of: Bold Park
- Basin countries: Australia
- Managing agency: Water Authority of Western Australia
- Built: c.1960

Bold Park Reservoir (also known as Mount Kenneth Reservoir) is a roofed reservoir in Bold Park in the suburb of City Beach, in Perth, Western Australia. It is sited on the western edge of Bold Park, off Kalinda Drive.

Bold Park Reservoir is situated approximately 8.7 kilometres (5.4 mi) west of the Perth central business district.

Water from either the groundwater schemes of Gwelup and Mirrabooka is fed to the reservoir, along with water from the hills dams. The reservoir is also topped up with water from a local artesian bore.

In 2005 the reservoir had half of its roof torn off in a violent storm.
