= Urbanisation in Australia =

Concentration of Australian population in urban areas

Australia is one of the world's most urbanised nations, with 87 percent living within 50 kilometres of the coast. As at the 2016 Census, more than two-thirds of Australians lived in a capital city, with 40 percent of the population being in the two largest cities of Sydney and Melbourne.

== Greater capital city areas by population density ==
Rank	Greater Capital City Statistical Area	State/territory	Population (2023)	Land area (km^{2})	Density (/km^{2})			
Rank	Greater Capital City Statistical Area	State/territory	1	Canberra	Australian Capital Territory	466,566	814.2	573
2	Melbourne	Victoria	5,207,145	9,993	521.08			
3	Adelaide	South Australia	1,446,380	3,259.8	443.7			
4	Sydney	New South Wales	5,450,496	12,367.7	440.7			
5	Perth	Western Australia	2,309,338	6,417.9	359.8			
6	Brisbane	Queensland	2,706,966	15,842	170.9			
7	Hobart	Tasmania	253,654	1,758.8	144.2			
8	Darwin	Northern Territory	150,736	3,163.8	47.6			

== 50 most densely populated Australian suburbs ==
Rank	Suburb	Metropolitan Area	Population	-Area (km²)	Inhabitants per km^{2}	Inhabitants per mi^{2}
1	Elizabeth Bay	Sydney	5,215	0.2509	20,785	53,833
2	Chippendale	Sydney	8,617	0.4642	18,563	48,078
3	Rushcutters Bay	Sydney	2,547	0.1574	16,182	41,910
4	Ultimo	Sydney	8,845	0.5588	15,829	40,996
5	Potts Point	Sydney	9,423	0.6204	15,189	39,338
6	Haymarket	Sydney	7,353	0.518	14,195	36,765
7	Pyrmont	Sydney	12,813	0.9325	13,740	35,588
8	Darlinghurst	Sydney	11,320	0.8569	13,210	34,215
9	Waterloo	Sydney	14,616	1.1338	12,891	33,388
10	Zetland	Sydney	10,078	0.8048	12,522	32,433
11	Surry Hills	Sydney	16,412	1.3164	12,467	32,290
12	Wentworth Point	Sydney	6,994	0.5739	12,186	31,564
13	Southbank	Melbourne	18,709	1.5639	11,963	30,984
14	Rhodes	Sydney	11,906	1.0061	11,834	30,649
15	Bondi	Sydney	10,045	0.8648	11,615	30,084
16	Redfern	Sydney	13,213	1.1717	11,277	29,207
17	Milsons Point	Sydney	2,158	0.1982	10,888	28,200
18	Woolloomooloo	Sydney	4,011	0.3722	10,776	27,911
19	Carlton	Melbourne	18,535	1.7488	10,599	27,451
20	Forest Lodge	Sydney	4,583	0.4446	10,308	26,698
21	Hillsdale	Sydney	5,501	0.5462	10,071	26,085
22	Erskineville	Sydney	8,014	0.8077	9,922	25,698
23	Allawah	Sydney	5,706	0.5837	9,776	25,319
24	Liberty Grove	Sydney	2,254	0.2327	9,686	25,087
25	Wolli Creek	Sydney	6,394	0.6614	9,667	25,038
26	Bondi Beach	Sydney	11,656	1.2193	9,560	24,759
27	Newtown	Sydney	15,029	1.5783	9,522	24,633
28	Harris Park	Sydney	5,799	0.6389	9,077	23,508
29	Enmore	Sydney	3,880	0.4422	8,774	22,725
30	Bondi Junction	Sydney	9,445	1.0792	8,752	22,667
31	Kirribilli	Sydney	3,820	0.4376	8,729	22,609
32	Teneriffe	Brisbane	5,335	0.6438	8,287	21,463
33	Neutral Bay	Sydney	10,488	1.2796	8,196	21,228
34	Darlington	Sydney	3,097	0.3808	8,133	21,064
35	Edgecliff	Sydney	2,580	0.3194	8,078	20,921
36	Breakfast Point	Sydney	4,188	0.5242	7,989	20,692
37	Queenscliff	Sydney	3,376	0.4228	7,985	20,681
38	Paddington	Sydney	12,911	1.6266	7,937	20,558
39	Coogee	Sydney	15,212	1.9175	7,933	20,547
40	Waitara	Sydney	5,941	0.7617	7,800	20,201
41	Kingsford	Sydney	15,482	1.9873	7,790	20,177
42	Lakemba	Sydney	17,023	2.1866	7,785	20,163
43	Dolls Point	Sydney	1,661	0.2203	7,540	19,528
44	Wiley Park	Sydney	10,126	1.3622	7,434	19,253
45	Fitzroy	Melbourne	10,445	1.4196	7,358	19,056
46	Campsie	Sydney	24,541	3.3734	7,275	18,842
47	Melbourne CBD	Melbourne	47,285	6.5045	7,270	18,828
48	North Bondi	Sydney	9,165	1.2637	7,253	18,784
49	Waverley	Sydney	4,346	0.6007	7,235	18,738
50	South Yarra	Melbourne	25,147	3.5476	7,088	18,359

== Central business district populations ==
Below is a table of the post populated central business districts in Australia. Melbourne has the highest population living in its city centre, mainly due to the large proximity of high rise apartment buildings, while the Adelaide CBD is the second most populated city centre in Australia despite being the fifth-most populous in urban area. Inner-city living is becoming increasingly popular throughout Australia, due to a greater access to employment opportunities, services, and transport.

Rank	Capital City Central Business District	State/territory	CBD Population (2021)	Area (km^{2})	Density (/km^{2})
1	Melbourne	Victoria	54,941	6.5	8452.5
2	Adelaide	South Australia	18,202	4.33	4203.6
3	Sydney	New South Wales	16,667	2.94	5669.04
4	Perth	Western Australia	13,670	4.6	2971.7
5	Brisbane	Queensland	12,587	2.5	5034.8
6	Darwin	Northern Territory	7,149	1.9	3762.6
7	Canberra	Australian Capital Territory	4,835	1.5	3453.6
8	Hobart	Tasmania	3,390	1.9	1784.2

== See also ==
- Demographics of Australia
- Urbanization in Africa
- Urbanization in China
- Urbanization in India
- Urbanization in the United States
- Urbanization
- Urban planning in Australia
- Urbanization by country
