= Greater Perth Movement =

Urban planning programme in Perth, Western Australia

The Greater Perth Movement describes a movement in the first three decades of the twentieth century to consolidate the town planning and urban administration of the Perth metropolitan region of Western Australia under a single municipal government. The movement is characterised as a period of conflict between those who sought a metropolitan municipal authority with control of key infrastructure and services, and the growth of state government control via statutory authorities.

The movement is most strongly associated with its chief proponent, William Bold, who was influenced by ideas of municipal socialism, and saw its initial successes in the amalgamation of the local governments of Leederville, North Perth, and Perth in 1914, joined by Victoria Park in 1917. A further proposal to merge Subiaco into the City of Perth was defeated in a 1935 referendum, followed by a 1938 Royal Commission into Bold's administration of the City of Perth which effectively marked the end of his political influence and the movement itself.

== Key events ==
- 1906: Perth Chief Clerk Bold delivers an address to the Western Australian Municipal Officers' Association outlining a vision of municipal socialism.
- 1908: The City of Perth council purchases the Perth Gas Co. at considerable expense.
- 1912: The council unsuccessfully bids against the state Labor government to purchase the Tramway.
- 1914: Bold sent by council to further investigate municipal developments in Britain and North America.
- 1917: The City of Perth purchased the Limekilns Estate, comprising 1,300 acres (530 ha), adjacent to their endowment lands.

== Aftermath and legacy ==
Following the 1920s there was a shift away from municipal consolidation towards metropolitan planning under statutory authorities of the state government commencing with Stephenson-Hepburn plan of 1955, leading to the creation of the Metropolitan Region Planning Authority in April 1960.

The consolidation of the City of Perth was reversed in 1993 with the creation of three new local government authorities within the former boundaries: the City of Vincent, the Town of Cambridge, and the Town of Victoria Park.

A 2015 attempt by the Barnett government to facilitate voluntary amalgamations amongst local government authorities led to the City of Perth and the City of Vincent investigating a potential merger. Despite initial support from the Mayor Alannah Mactiernan, the City of Vincent concluded that there was irreconcilable differences between the authorities which could not be resolved.

Having failed to expand the boundaries of the city via voluntary amalgamation, the state government legislated a minor expansion of the city’s municipal boundaries via the City of Perth Act 2015 to include several key state assets including the University of Western Australia, Queen Elizabeth II Medical Centre, Perth Children's Hospital and Kings Park. Attempts by the city to acquire the Burswood peninsula (containing the Crown Casino) were opposed by the Town of Victoria Park and not supported by the state government.

== See also ==
- City of Brisbane
- Greater Newcastle Act 1937
