= Town Planning and Development Act 1928 =

Western Australian repealed legislation

Parliament of Western Australia
- Long title: An Act relating to the Planning and Development of Land for Urban, Suburban, and Rural purposes.
- Citation: No. 39 of 1928
- Royal assent: 28 December 1928

The Town Planning and Development Act 1928 was an act of the Western Australian Parliament which laid down specific controls over planning at a metropolitan and local level as well as establishing more general controls over the subdivision of land. The act was based on earlier British legislation. It took 13 years for the act to pass through the parliament. The act formed the basis of the planning system of Western Australia into the early 21st century when the act was repealed and replaced by the Planning and Development Act 2005. In 1929, Sydney-based planner David L. Davidson was appointed the first Town Planning Commissioner tasked with implementing the act.

== Powers and functions ==
The act provided for the following powers and functions:

- Appointment of a Town Planning Board as a statutory approval authority.
- Procedures and requirements for obtaining subdivision approval; land use zoning and development.
- Empowered the Town Planning Board to require the provision of open space in new subdivisions (although no minimum requirements were included).
- Provided for local authorities to implement redevelopment schemes for established areas.
- Uniform by-laws.

== See also ==
- Metropolitan Region Scheme
- Western Australian Planning Commission
