= Municipality of North Perth =

Former local government area in Perth, Western Australia

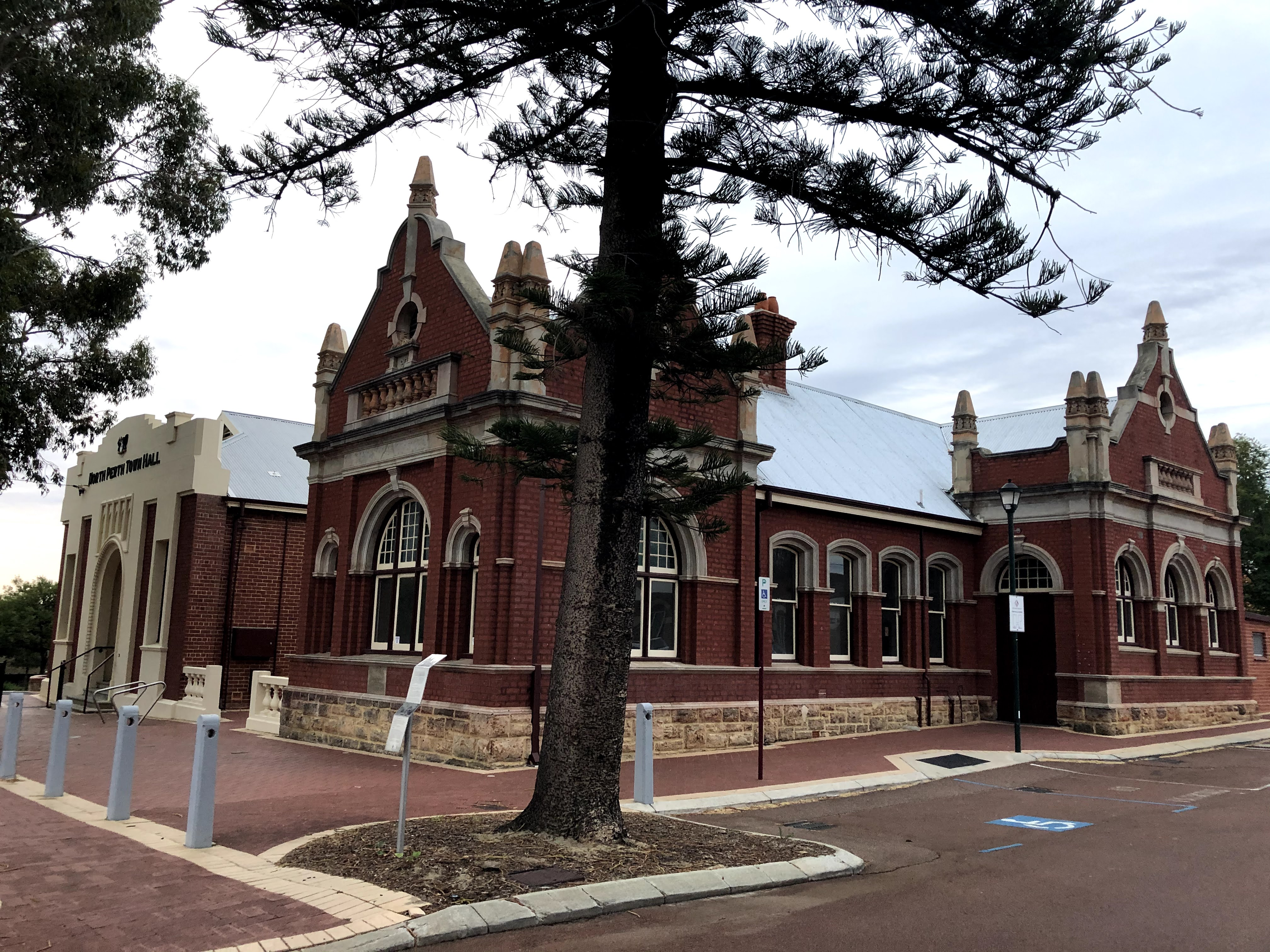
North Perth Town Hall buildings. The 1902 building is in the foreground and the 1910 building behind.

The Municipality of North Perth was a local government area in inner suburban Perth, Western Australia, centred on the suburb of North Perth.

It was established as the North Perth Road District on 10 March 1899. It was made a municipality on 25 October 1901. Its boundaries were extended at this time to include what would become the suburb of Mount Hawthorn. The North Perth area was largely undeveloped at the time of its creation, and in 1901 was "full of empty spaces and comparatively virgin country". Accordingly, it oversaw significant road construction in its early days; the area had "but two or three streets in order" when created, and 30 miles of paved road in the municipality by 1904.

The municipality built the first stage of the North Perth Town Hall in View Street as their new headquarters in 1902, with the larger second stage following in 1910. The state heritage-listed building survives today and continues to be used for community use.

The municipality ceased to exist on 22 July 1915 when, along with the Municipality of Leederville, it was voluntarily amalgamated into the City of Perth under the provisions of City of Perth Act 1914, becoming a new ward of that council represented by three councillors. By the time of its abolition, it encompassed 1,206 acres, had a population of 7,560 (up from 1,730 in 1903), had rateable property estimated at £50,308 and an annual rate income of £9,234 18s 5d.

== Mayors ==
The following people served as mayors of North Perth:

- Richard Septimus Haynes (1902-1903)
- Herbert Parker (1904-1905)
- John Milner (1906-1909)
- Robert Gamble (1910)
- William Randell (1911-1912)
- Ernest Waugh (1913-1914)
- A. H. Wasley (1914-1915)
