= Municipality of Leederville =

Former local government area in Perth, Western Australia

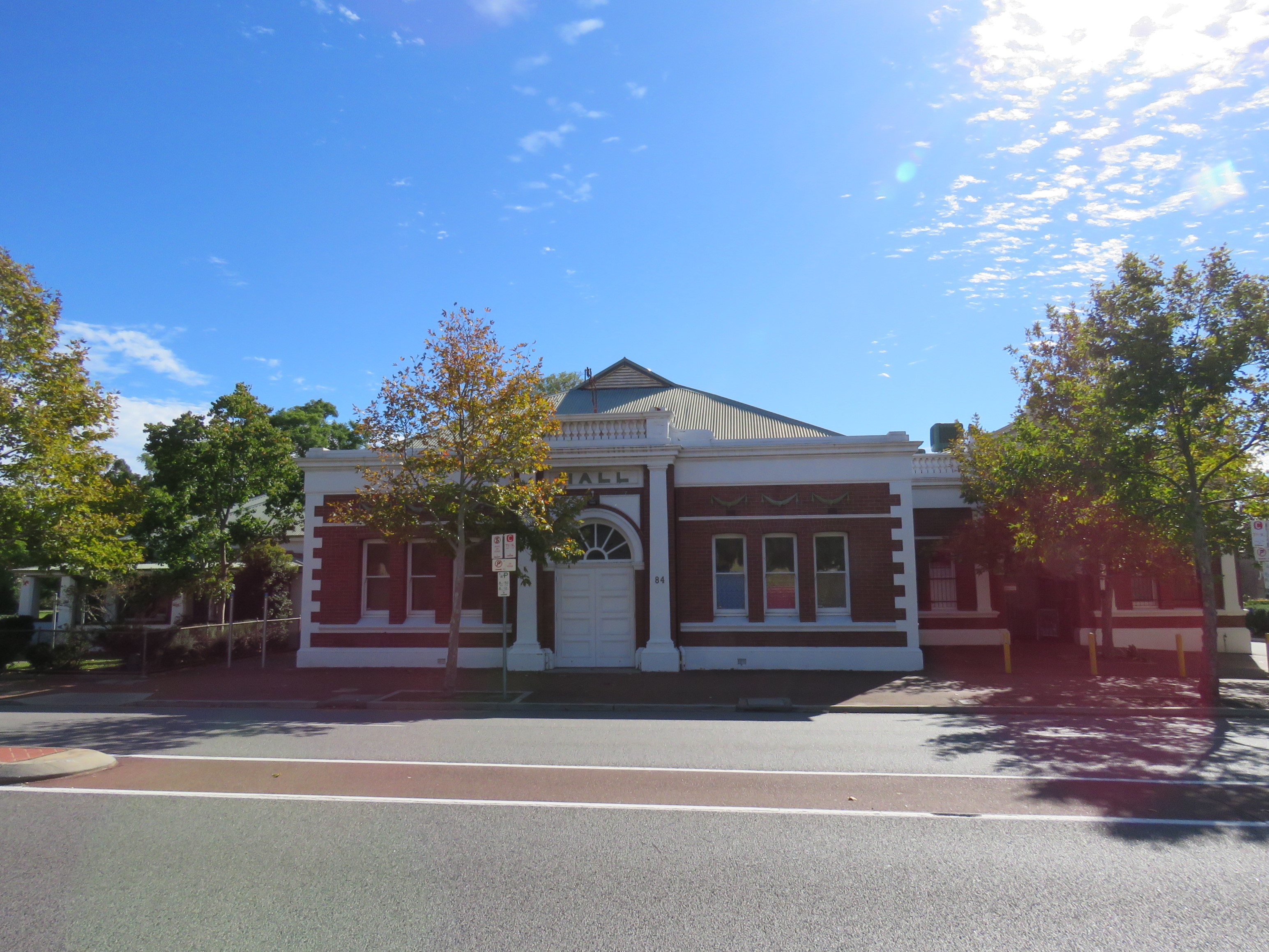
The Leederville Town Hall in 2021

The Municipality of Leederville was a local government area in inner suburban Perth, Western Australia, based around the suburb of Leederville.

It was established as the Leederville Road District on 3 May 1895. It was renamed the Municipality of Leederville on 3 April 1896.

The municipal boundaries were extended on 17 November 1905.

The municipality built the Leederville Town Hall in 1914, incorporating the existing Masonic Hall, which it adapted for council offices. However, in December 1914, two months after the hall's opening, the City of Perth Act 1914, which would abolish the municipality, received royal assent. The building remains open for community use today and is state heritage-listed.

It ceased to exist on 22 July 1915 as a result of the Greater Perth Movement, when it was merged into the City of Perth along with several other inner suburban municipalities under the provisions of the City of Perth Act 1914.
