= Planning and Development Act 2005 =

Western Australian legislation

Parliament of Western Australia
- Long title: An Act to provide for a system of land use planning and development in the State and for related purposes.
- Citation: No. 37 of 2005
- Royal assent: 12 December 2005

The Planning and Development Act 2005 is an act of the Western Australian Parliament which lays down specific controls over planning at a metropolitan and local level as well as establishing more general controls over the subdivision of land.

The act consolidated the Town Planning and Development Act 1928, Metropolitan Region Town Planning Scheme Act 1959 and the Western Australian Planning Commission Act 1985 into a single piece of legislation.

== See also ==
- Metropolitan Region Scheme
