= William E. Bold =

Western Australian town clerk

William Ernest Bold CBE (6 May 1873 – 25 November 1953) was a long-serving municipal clerk of Perth, Western Australia. He is generally acknowledged to be the founding father of urban planning in Western Australia.

Bold Park in the Perth suburb of City Beach is named after him, and Reabold Hill, "the highest natural point in the metropolitan area on the Swan Coastal Plain", is named after Bold and Francis Rea, a former mayor of the City of Perth.

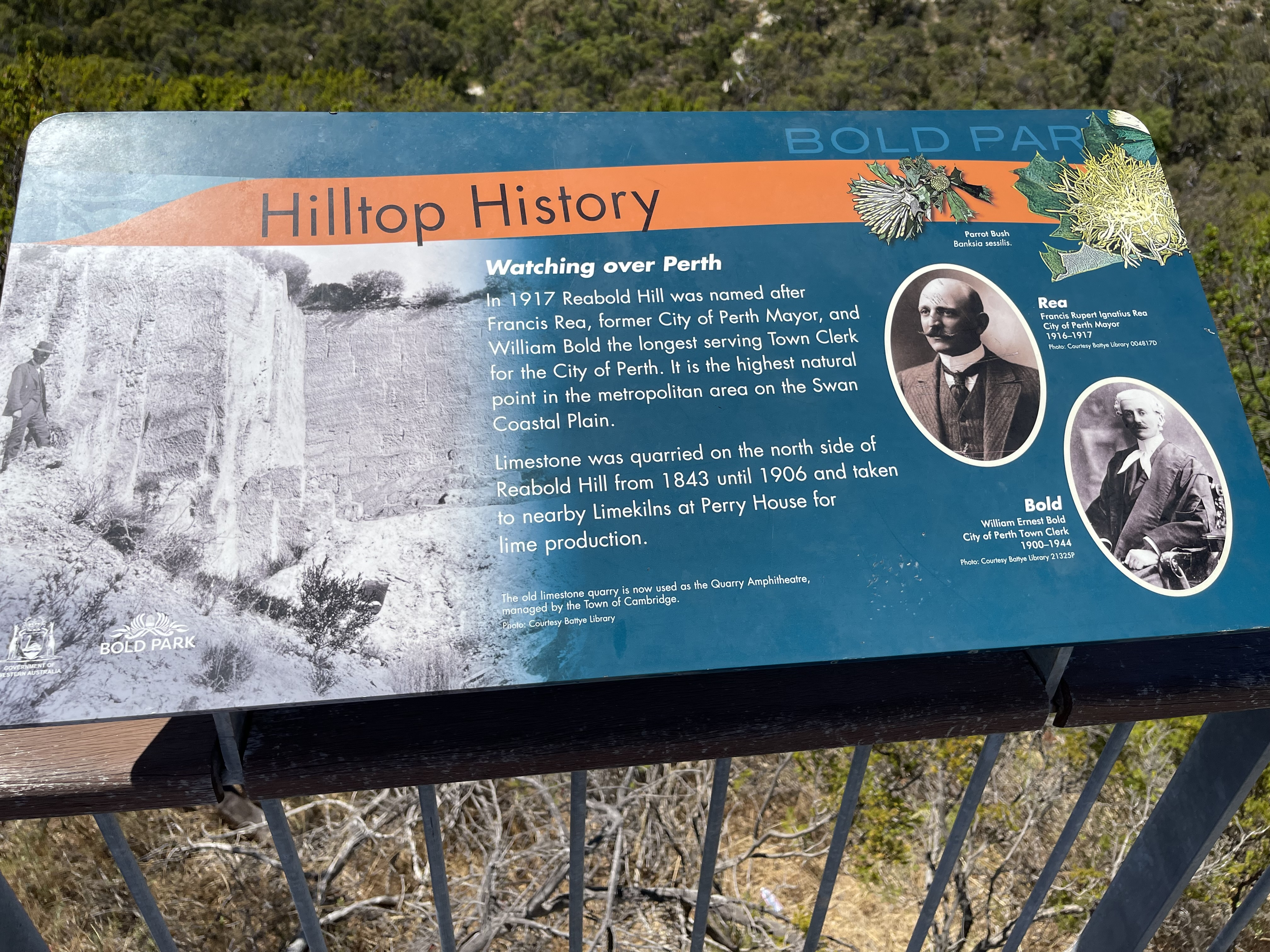
Information board at Reabold Hill Summit Boardwalk on Reabold Hill in Bold Park

== See also ==
- Municipal socialism
- City Beautiful movement
- City of Perth

== Sources ==
- Bold Park (n.d.). Hilltop History: Watching over Perth (Information board). Reabold Hill Summit Boardwalk: Bold Park. "In 1917 Reabold Hill was named after Francis Rea, former City of Perth Mayor, and William Bold the longest serving Town Clerk for the City of Perth."
- Stannage, Tom (1979). "William Ernest Bold (1873–1953)". Australian Dictionary of Biography. Vol. 7. National Centre of Biography, Australian National University. ISBN 978-0-522-84459-7. ISSN 1833-7538. OCLC 70677943.
