= City of Perth =

Local government area of Western Australia

- Local government area
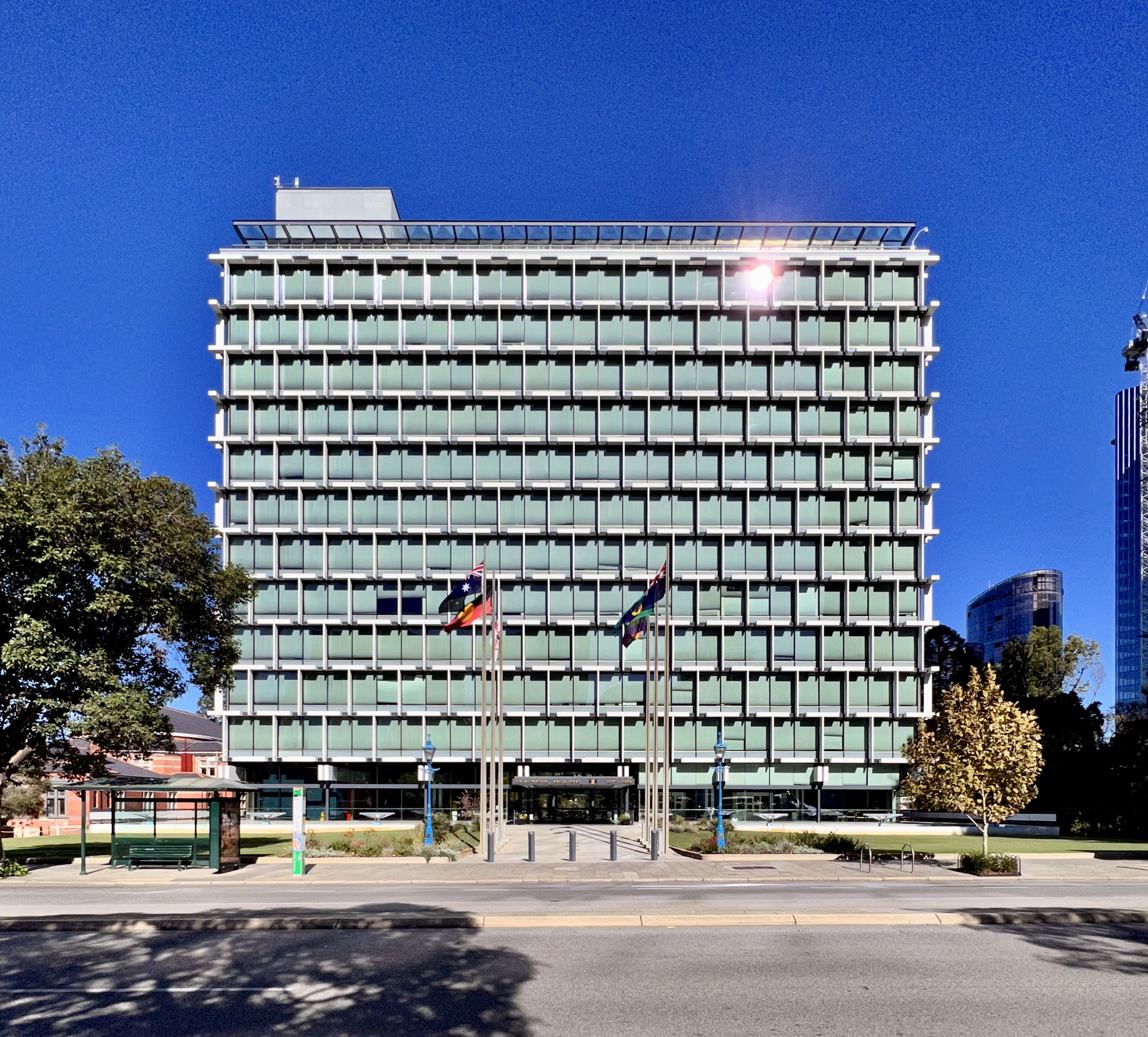
- Perth Council House has been the council seat since 1963

- Interactive map of City of Perth
- Coordinates: 31°57′S 115°51′E
- Country: Australia
- State: Western Australia
- Region: Central Perth
- Established: 1856
- Council seat: Council House, Perth

Government
  - Lord Mayor: Bruce Reynolds
  - State electorates: Nedlands; Perth
  - Federal divisions: Curtin; Perth

Area
  - Total: 20.01 km^{2} (7.73 sq mi)

Population
  - Total: 28,463 (LGA 2021)
- Website: City of Perth
LGAs around City of Perth
Cambridge	Vincent	Vincent
Subiaco	City of Perth	Belmont
Nedlands	South Perth	Victoria Park

The City of Perth is a local government area and body, within the Perth metropolitan area, which is the capital of Western Australia. The local government is commonly known as Perth City Council. The City covers the Perth city centre and surrounding suburbs. The City covers an area of 20.01 square kilometres (8 sq mi) and had an estimated population of 21,092 as at 30 June 2015. On 1 July 2016 the City expanded, absorbing 1,247 residents from the City of Subiaco.

== History ==
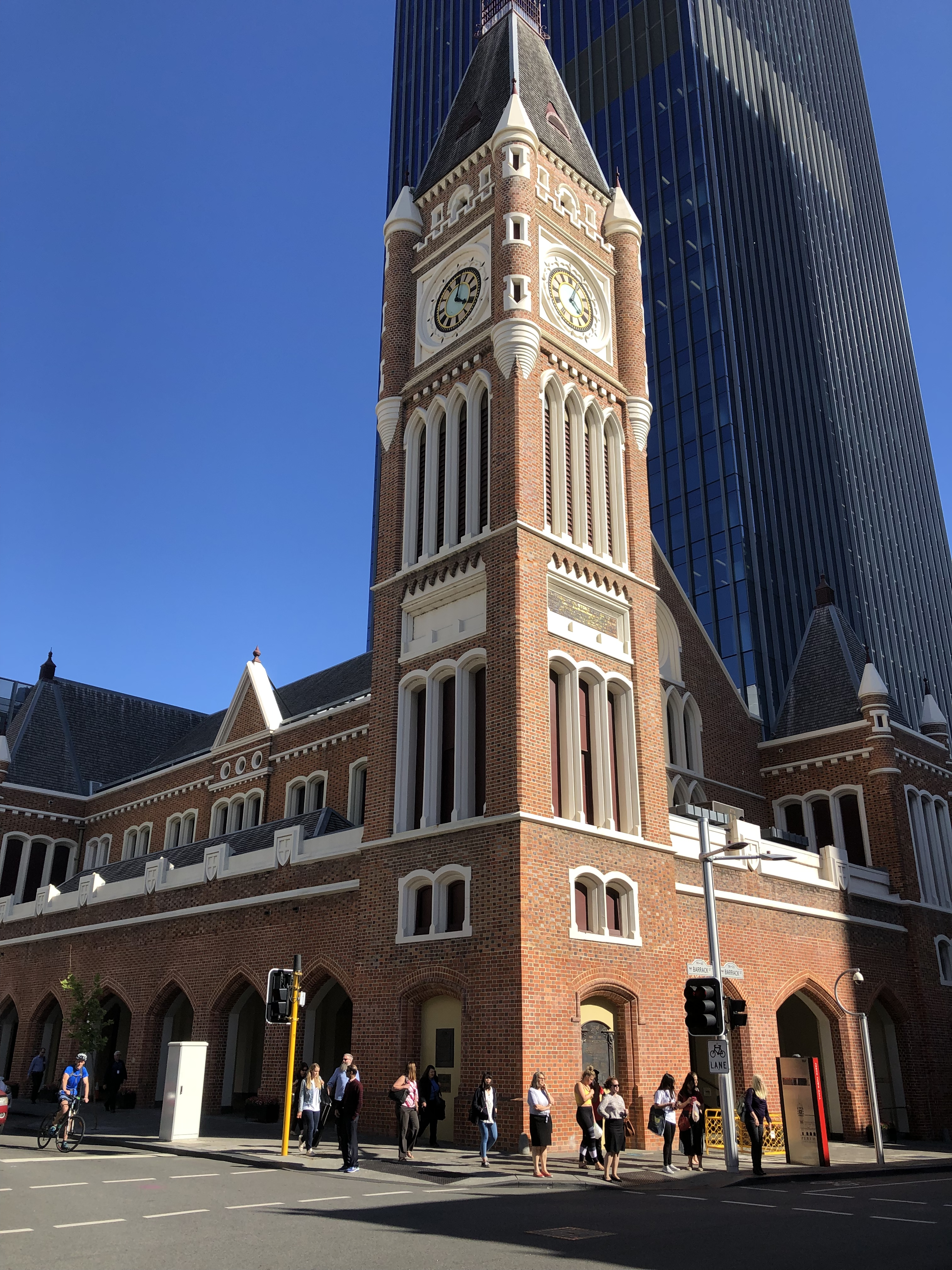
Perth Town Hall was the council seat from 1871 to 1925.

In 1829, Captain James Stirling founded Perth as part of the Swan River Colony. A Perth Town Trust was formed in 1838, but remained largely non-functional for many years due to lack of finance and administrative capacity leading to its dissolution in 1858. The City of Perth was officially declared on 23 September 1856 with council meeting for the first time in December 1858. In 1871, the City of Perth was reconstituted as a municipal corporation.

In 1915, following the efforts of WE Bold and the greater Perth movement, the city absorbed the Municipality of North Perth (1901) and the Municipality of Leederville (1895), and on 1 November 1917, the Municipality of Victoria Park was also absorbed. A year later, it absorbed territory from Perth Road Board (including the Belmont Park Racecourse) and purchased the 526 hectares (1,300 acres) Limekilns Estate in the western suburbs. The City developed the suburbs of Floreat Park, Wembley Park and City Beach on these lands.

The City of Perth Act 1925 gave the city additional powers over building control and regulation, including the power to declare new streets. In 1930 the first town planning committee was established.

Criticism of the city's governance by the David Davidson, the state's Town Planning Commissioner, led to a royal commission in 1938 on the grounds that the development of the western suburbs had led to the neglect of health and building administration in the central city area.

By 1962, the council had 27 members representing nine wards. The Metropolitan Region Town Planning Scheme Act Amendment Act 1963 required the city to establish a town planning department—which they did by appointing architect Paul Ritter in 1965. Ritter's two-year tenure was short and turbulent, leading to public conflict with councillors and his termination in 1967.

The city's first town planning scheme was submitted to the Town Planning Board in 1973, but not formally adopted until 1985. The reason for the delay was a state government desire to take discretionary powers out of the hands of the council. Council was felt to be too easily influenced by powerful developers.

On 1 July 1994, following the passage of the City of Perth Restructuring Act 1993, the City of Perth was broken up and a significantly reduced City of Perth constituted. The Town of Shepperton, Town of Cambridge and Town of Vincent were created from the former boundaries of the city. The first elections were held on 6 May 1995, with eight councillors and a mayor.

The City of Perth Act 2016 defined Perth as the capital of Western Australia, and expanded the city's boundaries to include a number of landmarks including Kings Park, University of Western Australia, Perth Children's Hospital and the Queen Elizabeth II Medical Centre. The boundary changes took effect on 1 July 2016. Approximately 1,247 residents from Nedlands and Subiaco in the City of Subiaco were transferred to the City of Perth, and the city expanded to a total area of 20.01 square kilometres (8 sq mi).

The Perth City Council was suspended on 2 March 2018, pending the establishment of a public inquiry into the council, by Local Government Minister David Templeman. The council was administered by three commissioners until 18 October 2020. The two-year inquiry carried out up until that point, conducted at a cost of nearly A$8.0 million made many findings, none of which resulted in criminal conviction.

In July 2021, the City of Perth formally recognised the Whadjuk Noongar people as the traditional owners of Noongar Country, the land on which the "City of Perth (Boorloo)" is located, signing the agreement Yacker Danjoo Ngala Bidi with Whadjuk elders on 10 August.

== Suburbs ==
The suburbs of the City of Perth with population and size figures based on the most recent Australian census:

Suburb	Population	Area	Map
Crawley *	3,975 (SAL 2021)	1.4 km^{2} (0.54 sq mi)	
East Perth *	11,681 (SAL 2021)	3.2 km^{2} (1.2 sq mi)	
Nedlands **	10,561 (SAL 2021)	5.4 km^{2} (2.1 sq mi)	
Northbridge	1,420 (SAL 2021)	0.5 km^{2} (0.19 sq mi)	
Perth *	13,670 (SAL 2021)	4.6 km^{2} (1.8 sq mi)	
West Perth *	6,102 (SAL 2021)	2.2 km^{2} (0.85 sq mi)	

* The parts of these suburbs north of Newcastle and Summers Streets fall within the City of Vincent. These localities are only partially contained within the City of Perth boundary.
** The parts of these localities were transferred from the City of Subiaco in 2016. These localities are only partially contained within the City of Perth boundary.

== Population ==
=== Pre-1915 composition ===
Year	Population
1911	35,767

=== 1915–1994 composition ===
Historical population

Year	Pop.	±% p.a.
1921	64,166	—
1933	82,290	+2.09%
1947	98,890	+1.32%
1954	97,350	−0.22%
1961	94,508	−0.42%
1966	96,223	+0.36%

Year	Pop.	±% p.a.
1971	97,546	+0.27%
1976	87,598	−2.13%
1981	79,398	−1.95%
1986	79,409	+0.00%
1991	79,422	+0.00%

The 1991 population has been broken down by the Australian Bureau of Statistics as follows: Perth (C) 7,604; Cambridge (T) 22,740; Victoria Park (T) 24,313; Vincent (T) 24,765.

=== 1994–present composition ===
Historical population

Year	Pop.	±% p.a.
1996	8,488	—
2001	11,180	+5.66%
2006	11,573	+0.69%

Year	Pop.	±% p.a.
2011	16,714	+7.63%
2016	21,797	+5.45%
2021	28,463	+5.48%

== Twin towns and sister cities ==
The City of Perth is twinned with:

(Japan) Kagoshima 1974; (United States) Houston 1984; (Greece) Megisti 1984; (Greece) Rhodes 1984	(United States) San Diego 1987; (Italy) Vasto 1989; (China) Nanjing 1998; (Taiwan) Taipei 1999	(United Kingdom) Perth 2006; (South Korea) Seocho 2008; (China) Chengdu 2010

== Flag and coat of arms ==
Flag of Perth
- Use: City
- Proportion: 1:2
- Adopted: 1975

The official Flag of Perth represents the city of Perth, Western Australia. It features the Saint George's Cross overlaid with the coat of arms of Perth in the centre. Though the designer of the flag is unknown, it is thought to have been designed prior to 1872. In the 1920s, the black swan was removed from the top left quadrant of the flag and replaced with the coat of arms in the centre of the cross.

The coat of arms were originally granted to the City of Perth on 2 December 1926. They were altered with the addition of part of the arms of Perth, Scotland in 1949.

== Heritage listed places ==
As of 2024, 1,032 places are heritage-listed in the City of Perth, of which 226 are on the State Register of Heritage Places.
