= List of State Register of Heritage Places in the City of Bayswater =

The State Register of Heritage Places is maintained by the Heritage Council of Western Australia. As of 2026, 401 places are heritage-listed in the City of Bayswater, of which 24 are on the State Register of Heritage Places.

== List ==
The Western Australian State Register of Heritage Places, as of 2026, lists the following 24 state registered places within the City of Bayswater:

Place name	Place #	Street number	Street name	Suburb or town	Co-ordinates	Notes & former names	Photo
Albany Bell Hatchery (former)	669	90	Guildford Road	Mount Lawley	31.934778°S 115.885551°E		
Maylands Brickworks	2410	22	Swan Bank Road	Maylands	31.941631°S 115.903304°E		
Tranby House	2411	2C	Johnson Road	Maylands	31.94275°S 115.91042°E		
Maylands Aerodrome (former)	2412	21	Swan Bank Road	Maylands	31.950000°S 115.905000°E	WA Police Department Transport Section, WA Police Academy & Reserve	
Maylands Police Station and Quarters	2417	196	Guildford Road	Maylands	31.930170°S 115.894886°E		
Maylands Post Office & Quarters (former)	2422	160	Whatley Crescent	Maylands	31.929429°S 115.891172°E	Antiques & Collectors, Maylands Post Office (former)	
Peninsula Hotel (former)	2423	219-221	Railway Parade	Maylands	31.927943°S 115.891335°E	Peninsula Community Centre	
Royal WA Institute for the Blind (former)	2424	134	Whatley Crescent	Maylands	31.930520°S 115.889765°E	WA Ballet Centre, Senses Foundation Inc	
Albany Bell Castle	2429	86	Guildford Road	Maylands	31.934423°S 115.88483°E		
Halliday House	3260	114	King William Street	Bayswater	31.925597°S 115.919347°E	Leighton, Bayswater Historical Society	
English Oaks, Tranby House	4387	Near corner of	Johnson & Hardey Roads	Maylands	31.94275°S 115.91042°E		
Maylands Parcel Office	4563	Corner	Whatley Crescent & Eighth Avenue	Maylands	31.928265°S 115.892029°E	Maylands Railway Station House, Falkirk Railway Station (on plans only)	
Maylands Primary School	9394	150	Guildford Road	Maylands	31.931830°S 115.891484°E	Constable Care Child Safety Foundation, School of Instrumental Music	
Shop	9996	188-190	Whatley Crescent	Maylands	31.928543°S 115.892386°E		
Shops	9997	192-194	Whatley Crescent	Maylands	31.928468°S 115.892501°E		
Chapel Funerals	9998	196	Whatley Crescent	Maylands	31.928410°S 115.892535°E	Shop/Dwelling	
Metro Health Clinic	9999	202	Whatley Crescent	Maylands	31.928367°S 115.892699°E	Maylands Pre Owned Shop	
The Lamp Man	10000	204	Whatley Crescent	Maylands	31.928258°S 115.892696°E	Tent Shop	
Attention Curios Collectables / Shop & Dwelling	10001	206	Whatley Crescent	Maylands	31.928224°S 115.892766°E	Maylands Station Pawn Shop	
Antiques Shop	10002	206	Whatley Crescent	Maylands	31.928131°S 115.892844°E		
Garratt Road Bridge	11342		Garratt Road	Bayswater	31.932400°S 115.916400°E	Down stream (1972), MRWA 950, Garratt Road Bridges Upstream (1935)	
Whatley Crescent Group, Maylands	14896	178-206	Whatley Crescent	Maylands		Consists of Three Shops, Shop 188-190 Whatley Crescent, Shop 192-194 Whatley Crescent, Chapel Funerals, Metro Health Clinic, The Lamp Man, Attention Curios Collectables and Antiques Shop	
John Gregory's Farm (archaeological site)	16303	88-90	Guildford Road	Maylands	31.934423°S 115.88483°E	The Pines, Pineapple Inn	
Three Shops	17080	178-182	Whatley Crescent	Maylands	31.928673°S 115.892223°E		
