= Seventh Avenue Bridge =

Former bridge in Perth, Western Australia

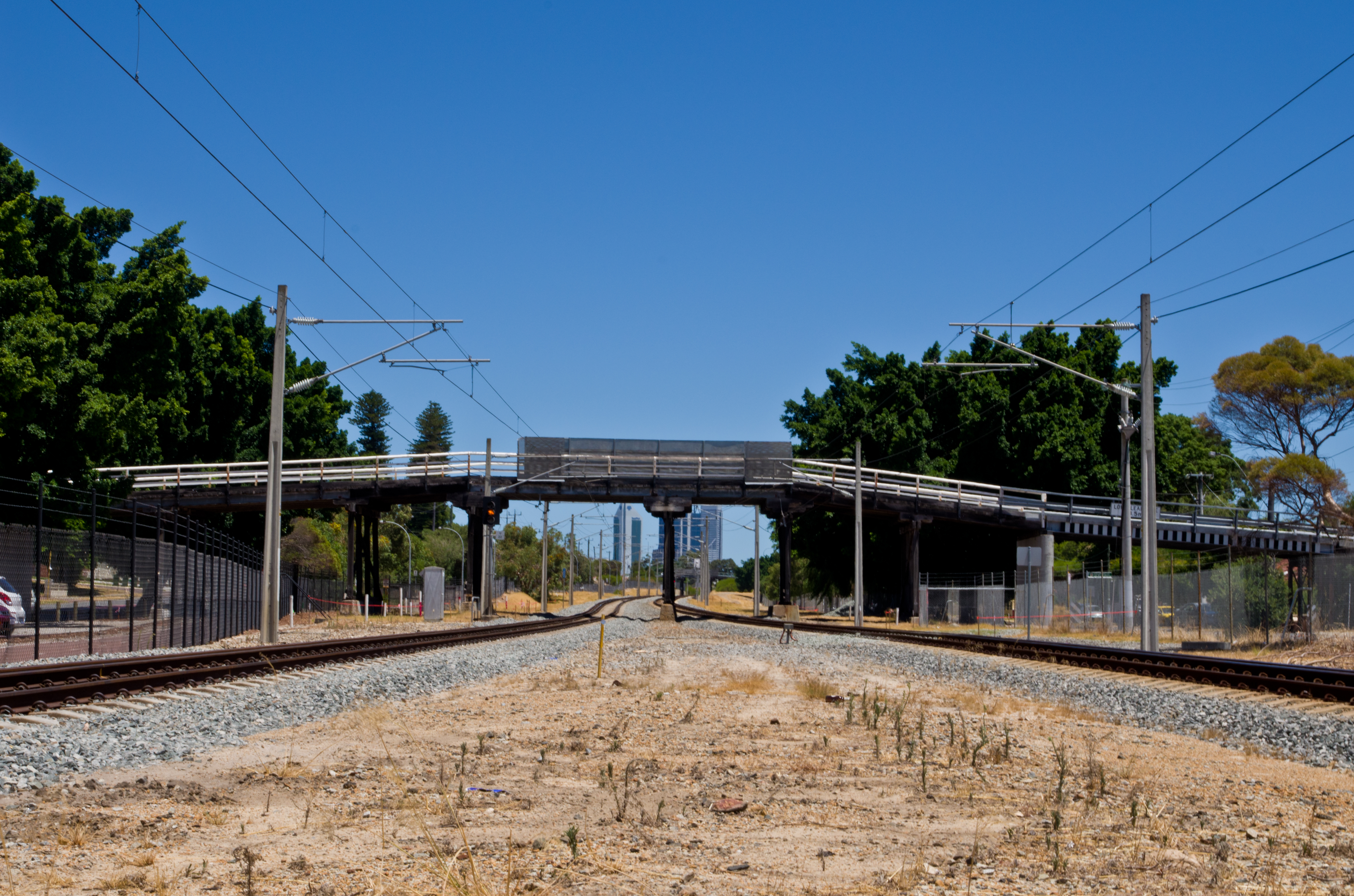
- View of the Seventh Avenue Bridge from Maylands railway station
- Coordinates: 31°56′S 115°53′E
- Carries: Seventh Avenue
- Crosses: Midland railway line

History
- Opened: 1913
- Closed: April 2014

Seventh Avenue Bridge was a historic bridge in Maylands, Western Australia that was demolished and replaced in 2014. It carried vehicle traffic over the Midland railway line immediately south of Maylands railway station.

== History ==
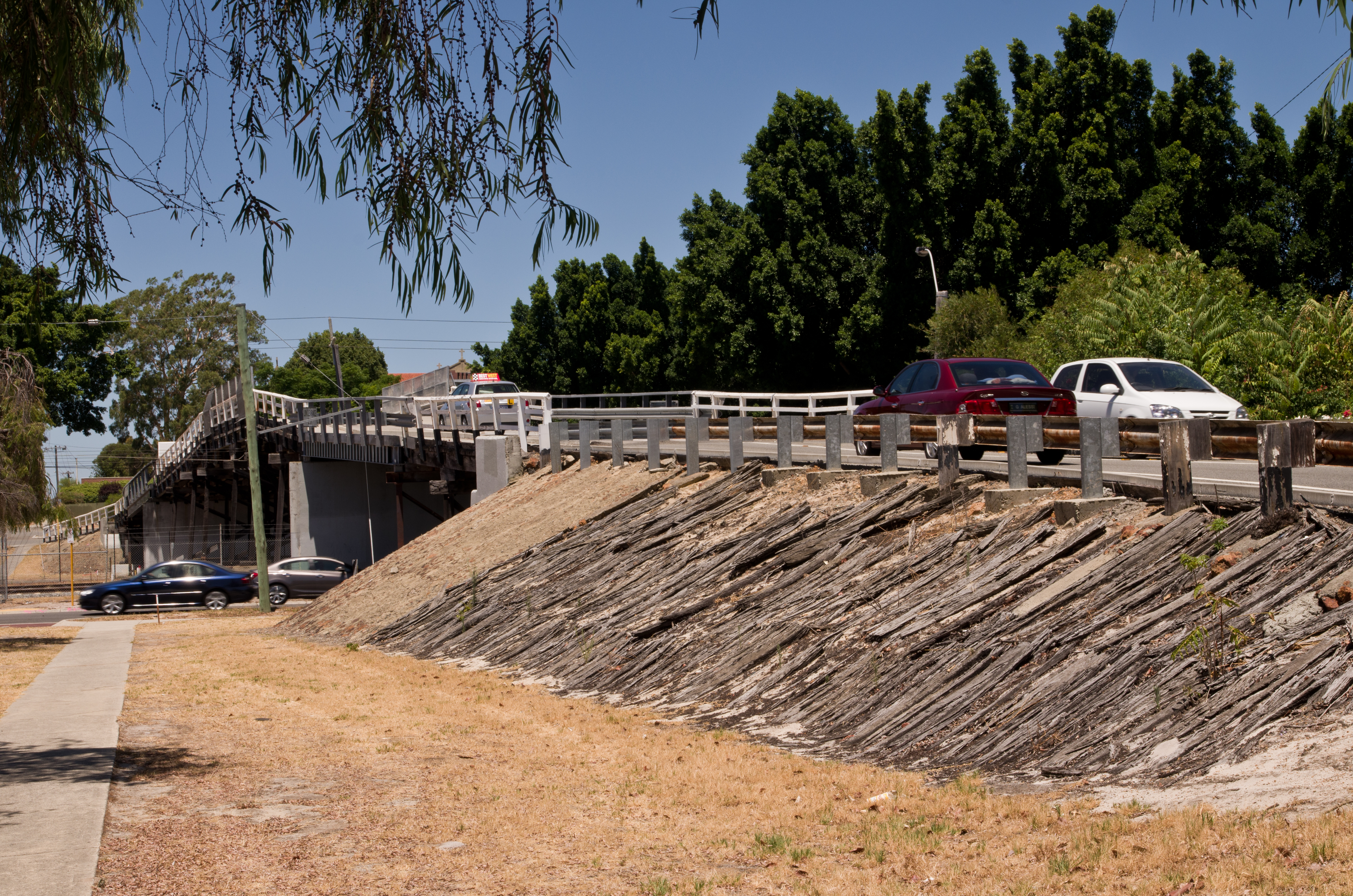
Bridge in February 2014

The Seventh Avenue Bridge was proposed as early as 1911, and built in 1913. From the 1930s to the 1950s the bridge had attention due to repairs and safety issues.

== Replacement ==
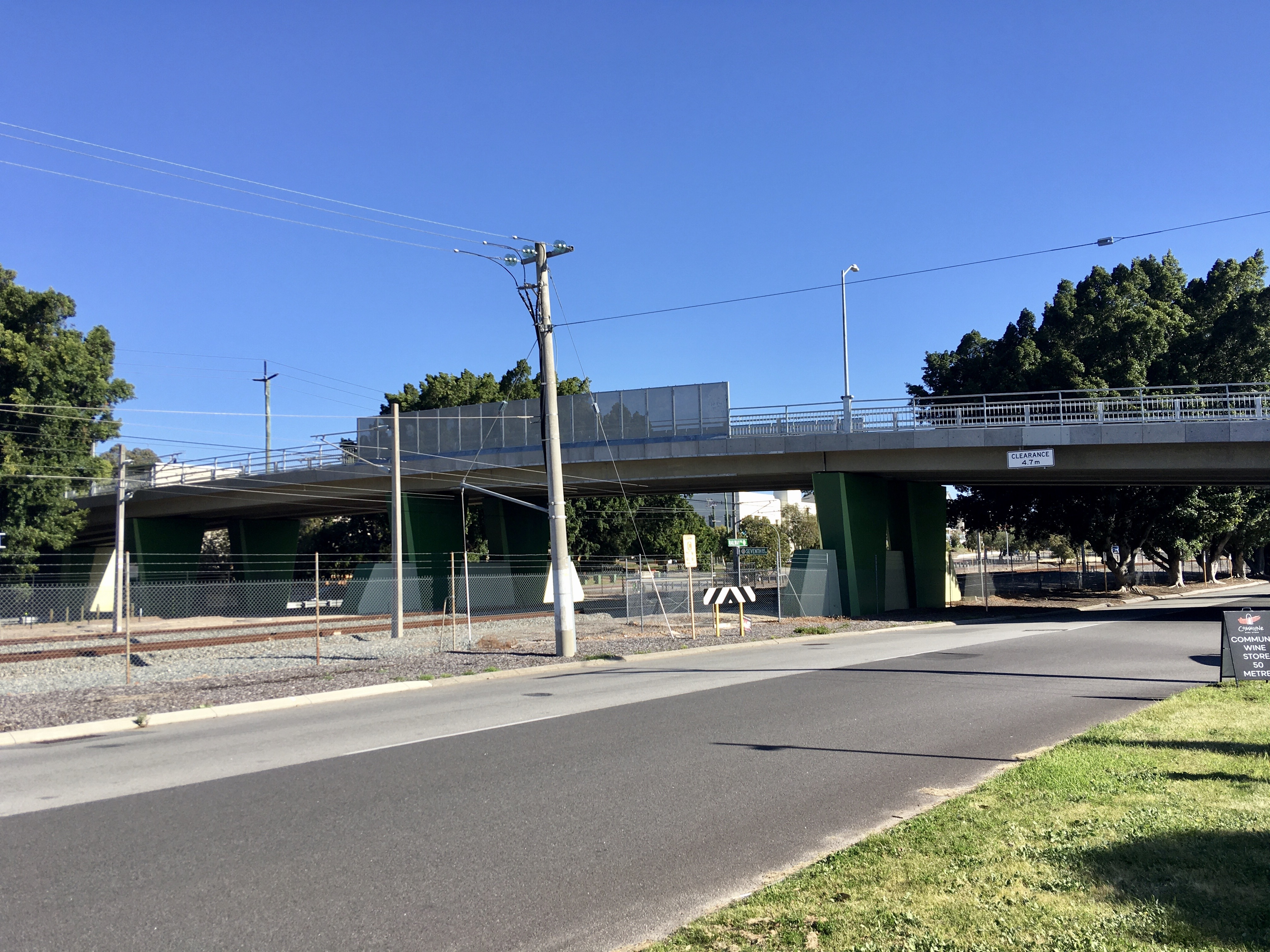
The replacement bridge in September 2021

In 2012, with the bridge approaching 100 years of age, Main Roads Western Australia deemed it to be past its service life and in need of replacement. Local residents were not consulted during the design of the new bridge, which Maylands MP Lisa Baker and Maylands Residents and Ratepayers Association saw as concerning and disappointing. Baker said that this would result in heritage value being lost. The old bridge however was commemorated with $89,000 being spent on locally influenced artwork. Transport Minister Troy Buswell did not believe community involvement was needed in the structural design of the bridge, which had been undertaken by qualified engineers to ensure the new structure would be built on the same footprint, while taking into consideration modern safety and operational standards.

The replacement bridge was built on the same alignment as the original bridge, but with larger dimension in length, width, and height. This will allow for additional railway tracks and larger vehicles to travel beneath the bridge, and heavier vehicles are able to cross the bridge. The design included a span length of more than 80 metres (260 ft), footpaths, noise walls, guard rails, and electrification screens. The project was funded by the state government, with tenders called for in January 2014 and work wanted to begin a few months later, and taking approximately one year.

Public art was included in the project to recognise the heritage value of the site, and be a "point of interest" for local residents and visitors. Local organisations were involved in the artistic process, including the City of Bayswater, Maylands Historical and Peninsula Association, Maylands Business Association, Maylands Residents and Ratepayers Association and Creative Maylands.

The project was announced in October 2012, with a small amount of pre-construction work undertaken at that time. Work commenced in April 2014. The existing bridge was entirely demolished in early 2015 over a planned 48 hour shut down period.

The new Seventh Avenue Bridge was officially opened on 6 May 2015 by Transport Minister Dean Nalder, at which time it carried about 3,500 vehicles per day.
