= Evan Davies Building =

Building in Fremantle, Western Australia

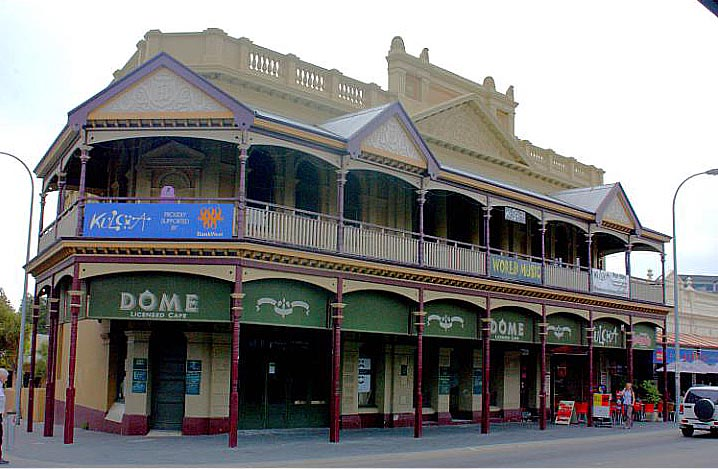
- Evan Davies Building 2013.
- Interactive map of the Evan Davies Building area
- Alternative names: Literary Institute

General information
- Architectural style: Federation Academic Classical
- Location: 32.05575°S 115.7473°E, 13 South Terrace, Fremantle, Western Australia
- Current tenants: Dôme
- Construction started: 1898
- Completed: 1899
- Opened: 15 March 1899
- Cost: £1,528
- Landlord: City of Fremantle

Technical details
- Floor count: 2

Design and construction
- Architecture firm: Wilkinson, Smith and Wilson
- Main contractor: L.Burness

Western Australia Heritage Register
- Type: State Registered Place
- Designated: 29 October 1993
- Reference no.: 861

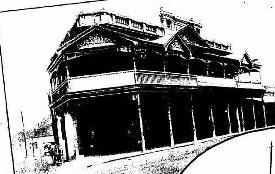
Evan Davies Building 1916

The Evan Davies Building, also known as the Literary Institute Building, is a heritage listed building located at 13 South Terrace, Fremantle, Australia, on the corner with Collie Street. It was one of many buildings constructed in Fremantle during the gold boom period in the late nineteenth and early twentieth century.

The building was completed in 1899, and was opened on 15 March 1899 as the Literary Institute. The architects for the work were Messrs. Wilkinson, Smith, and Wilson, with the main contractor being L. Burness. The building was completed at a cost of £1,528.

The two storey building is constructed from brick, render and iron in the Federation Academic Classical style of architecture.

The Literary Institute in Fremantle, thought to be the oldest in Western Australia, was established in 1868 from an amalgamation between two private institutions, the Working Man's Association and the Mechanics Institute. It was housed at a number of locations around Fremantle until the gold boom, when many new buildings were constructed around the town. The architects, Wilkinson, Smith, and Wilson, drew up the plan as part of a competition to design the new building.

It was opened in 1899 by the Mayor of Fremantle, Elias Solomon; at this time the ground floor housed two shops, a public entrance leading to the main hall and an ante-room on the ground floor. The first floor held the rooms of the Literary Institute. The main hall is recessed from the street with a portico in front. The hall was 40 ft (12 m) by 40 ft (12 m) with a raised platform at the rear that was 13.5 ft (4 m) deep. The walls were decorated with dado and stencilling. The entrance to the library was on the side up the hall leading to a small passage to the jarrah stairway with turned balusters. On the first floor was the library, librarian's quarters, smoking and chess room, public reading room and a committee room. There was also a balcony surrounding the front of the building. The front elevation has ionic columns as the chief feature on the balcony, which holds a pediment with decorated tympanum. The windows have circular-heads and are divided with doric pilasters with supporting the archivolt.

In 1935 the Institute had 481 members and by 1939 there were 385 members using the facilities, which included the 13,000 books stored in the library section.

The Institute remained in the building until 1949, when the City of Fremantle acquired the building and used it to house the Fremantle City Council Library. Renovations were carried out between April and September 1949 before the building was reopened as a public library in September by James Battye. The building was renamed the Evan Davies Civic Library, in honour of a local MP, Evan Davies, and has been known as the Evan Davies Building since then.

The first floor was for a considerable time the location of the Fremantle Harbour Theatre. In 2015 the building housed a bar on the 272 m^{2} (2,928 sq ft) first floor and a Dôme café on the ground floor.

Later the same year the top floor was vacated and a refurbishment works of the building was undertaken. The Fremantle City Council ordered the works to address essential structural issues and other maintenance work.

== See also ==
- List of heritage places in Fremantle
