= Maylands Brickworks =

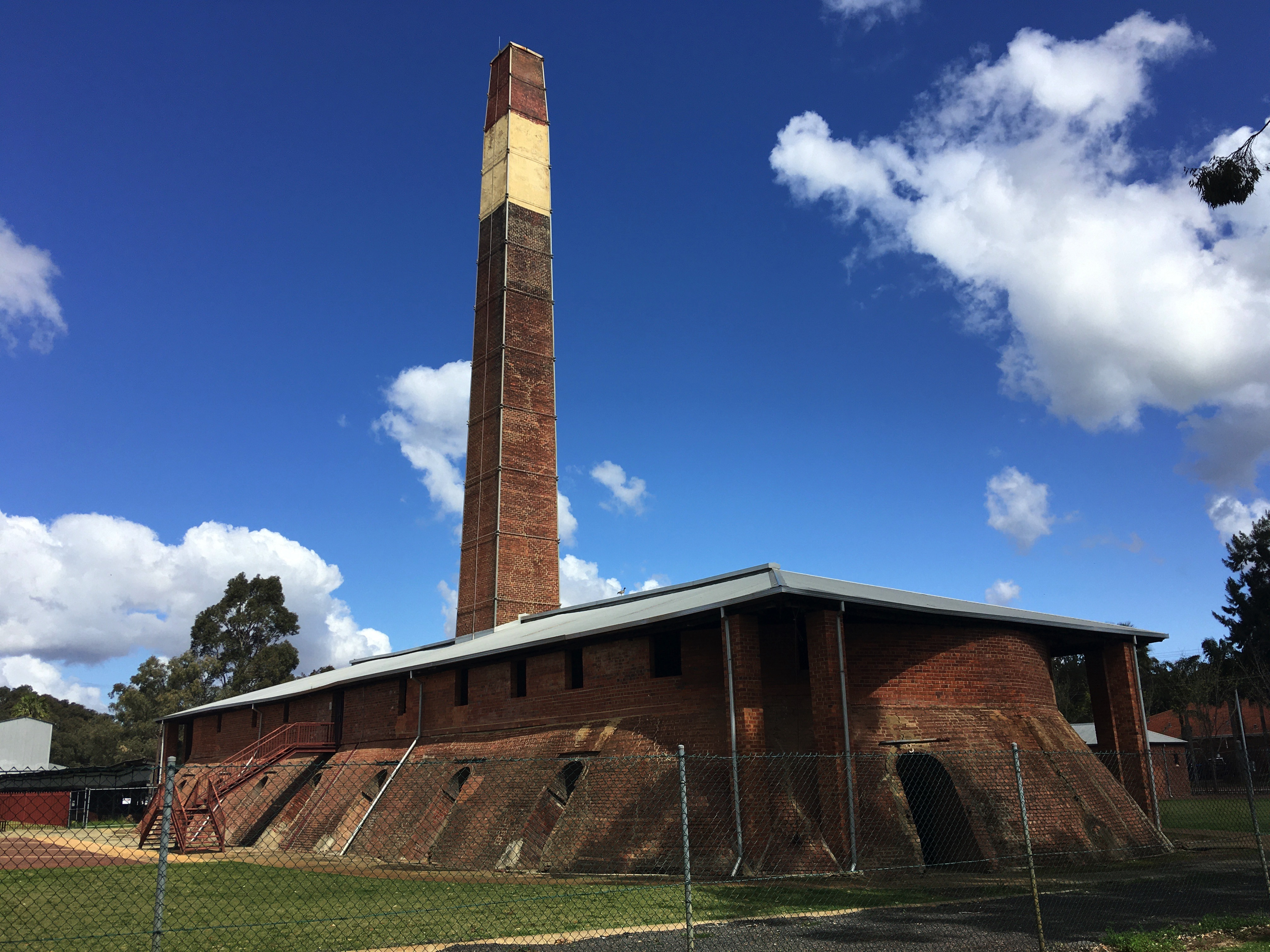
- Maylands Brickworks in September 2021
- Interactive map of the Maylands Brickworks area

General information
- Type: Heritage listed factory
- Location: Maylands, Western Australia
- Coordinates: 31.941631°S 115.903304°E

Western Australia Heritage Register
- Type: State Registered Place
- Designated: 9 February 1996
- Reference no.: 2410

Maylands Brickworks is a historical brickworks factory in Maylands, Western Australia. It operated between 1927 and 1983.

== History ==
The brickworks were developed by Robert Law and King Atkins, who had previously started a brickworks in Helena Vale. The brickworks opened in 1927 when the Maylands peninsula was largely undeveloped. The only other significant structure at the time was the Maylands Aerodrome, and both were surrounded by farmland. The Maylands site was considered ideal as the peninsula had an abundance of clay, and was close to the Perth central business district but isolated from suburban residential areas. In the 1940s it was claimed to be one of the most modern operations in Australia at that time.

Construction works were extensive, excavating two large-scale clay pits, two large Hoffman kilns, and an assembly of drying sheds.

During the 1968 Meckering earthquake, one of the kilns was damaged, and subsequently demolished.

Operations ceased in 1983, with plans to demolish the site. Community opposition led to the brickworks being preserved, and the clay pits turned into artificial lakes (Lake Bungaree and Lake Bungana). The site was fenced, preventing public access, and the adjacent land redeveloped into a residential area.

Various studies before closure and after were made of the site.

== Operation ==
The Maylands Brickworks would excavate clay on-site, which would be refined and mixed with water into a paste in the pug mill, inside a large building made from wood and corrugated iron. The mixture was then sent through an extruder to make bricks, which were cut and left to dry inside the immense drying sheds. Once dried out, the bricks – which were already hard – were arranged in the kilns, covered with powdered coal, and fired. The powdered coal would get between the gaps in the bricks, ensuring all were properly fired. The process emitted noxious fumes. By the 1980s, it was mostly automated, and one of the most sophisticated operations in Australia.

== Legacy ==
The Maylands Brickworks were listed as a heritage site on the State Register on 9 February 1996, and on the City of Bayswater Municipal Inventory on 17 June 1997. What remains of the site is generally in good condition, and are the original structures. Restoration of arches of the kiln was completed with original bricks found on-site.

In 2017, the City of Bayswater local government and the State Heritage Office were considering redevelopment options to activate the site. Options were proposed in April 2018: residential developments, with small commercial spaces on the ground floor; a clubhouse space for the adjacent golf course; and rezoning to public open space, as an "urban square". The golf clubhouse option was the Department of Planning, Lands and Heritage preferred option, when it released a feasibility study in May 2019. The City of Bayswater rejected the clubhouse concept, which would have included a high density residential development on the site, and decided to terminate the joint redevelopment project in favour of investigating alternative community usages for the site.

== See also ==
- List of State Register of Heritage Places in the City of Bayswater
