= Roelands Aboriginal Mission =

Farm property used to house Aboriginal children from the Stolen Generations

Roelands Aboriginal Mission, also known as Roelands Native Mission or simply Roelands Mission, was a farm property used to house Aboriginal children from the Stolen Generations.

Peter Albany Bell, following his retirement in 1928, purchased 3,750 acres (1,520 ha) in Roelands not far from Bunbury, where he established the Chandler Home for Unemployed Boys – a philanthropic venture that stemmed from his time as a Justice of the Peace in the Children's Court, and his observations of how young offenders and miscreants were treated in the United States while on a business trip in 1915. The site was reused by Bell to create the Roelands Native Mission Farm, which was intended to be a self-sufficient, sustainable farm for Aboriginal families.

By 1941, the farm was exclusively used to house Aboriginal children. It accommodated over 500 children of the Stolen Generations over the subsequent 34 years, some from as far as the Pilbara region. In 1946 Roelands Native Mission Farm was affiliated (Note: It is unclear whether there was a takeover involving a change in management, or merely informal cooperation.) with the United Aborigines Mission.

On 1 July 1973, the name changed to Roelands Homes Incorporated, and was part of the Missionary Fellowship group, along with other organisations running similar missions. In this era Roelands had several satellite properties, including Wollaston in Bunbury and the Valima Girls' Hostel in Perth.

The property was bought by the Churches of Christ Federal Aborigines Mission Board in 1975, which closed the mission, and converted it into Roelands Village. In 2013, renovations were undertaken to transform it into a "place of healing", and education.
