= Peter Albany Bell =

Western Australian caterer and confectioner

Peter Albany Bell (20 April 1871 – 14 September 1957) was a caterer and confectioner in Western Australia. He was a significant manufacturer in the state's developing economy.

== Early life ==
Peter Albany Bell was born near Clare, South Australia on 20 April 1871, to farmer Peter Bell and wife Jane (née Craig). Bell's education was almost entirely informal. In 1887, after his father died, he moved with his mother to Western Australia. Bell worked as a draper's delivery boy, then an inland stockman, and later a shop assistant, before opening his own confectionery shop in 1894.

== Business ==
Bell's shop was located on Hay Street in Perth, where he made and sold his own confectionery and lemon squash. He opened several more shops and a factory over the next ten years, and in 1898 travelled to the United States to study the soda-fountain trade. Upon his return, he introduced new manufacturing methods and products, including fruit juices, ice cream sundaes, and milkshakes.

Amid increased competition after the federation of Australia, Bell began making cakes and pastries, and his confectionery shops became tea rooms. His company, Albany Bell Ltd, was started in October 1911, and eventually operated eleven tea rooms in Perth, three more in the Kalgoorlie-Boulder area, and a manufacturing factory, Albany Bell Castle, in Mount Lawley.

By 1925, Bell was chairman of the Master Caterers' Association; in that year he faced an unruly strike from the Hotel and Restaurant Employees' Union that lasted for four weeks. With public criticism over the lack of police involvement, and censure motion made against the government due to that issue, Bell pushed for the union to be deregistered, but was not successful. An agreement was finally reached with the union, but Bell was disheartened by the process, and with increasing costs and competition, sold his portion of the business in 1928.

== Philanthropy and other roles ==
Bell was commissioned as a justice of the peace in 1909, and worked in the Children's Court.

Bell volunteered to work overseas for the Young Men's Christian Association during the First World War. He departed in October 1916 aboard SS Afric, was engaged in both England and France, and returned in February 1919.

Following his retirement in 1928, Bell purchased 1,520 hectares (3,750 acres) in Roelands not far from Bunbury, where the Chandler Home for Unemployed Boys was established. Later becoming the Roelands Aboriginal Mission, this venture stemmed from his time in the Children's Court, and his observations of how young offenders and miscreants were treated in the United States while on a business trip in 1915.

Bell's charitable donations included donating the annual harvests of his citrus orchard in Roelands – over 2000 cases in the 1965–75 season – for missions and orphanages, so that the children could eat fresh fruit.

== Family ==
Bell married Edith Agnes, née Clark, on 11 March 1896 in Adelaide, South Australia. They had nine children together.

== Death and legacy ==
Bell died on 14 September 1957, and was buried at Karrakatta Cemetery.

M. Tamblyn, writing for the Australian Dictionary of Biography in 1975, considers Bell to be a significant figure due to his being a "manufacturer in the early years of the century when Western Australia lagged behind the other States in developing urban industries".

Bell was recognised as one of the most influential Western Australian businesspeople in The West Australian's 2013 list of the 100 most influential.
