= Peninsula Hotel, Maylands =

Heritage listed former hotel in Maylands, Western Australia

Peninsula Hotel
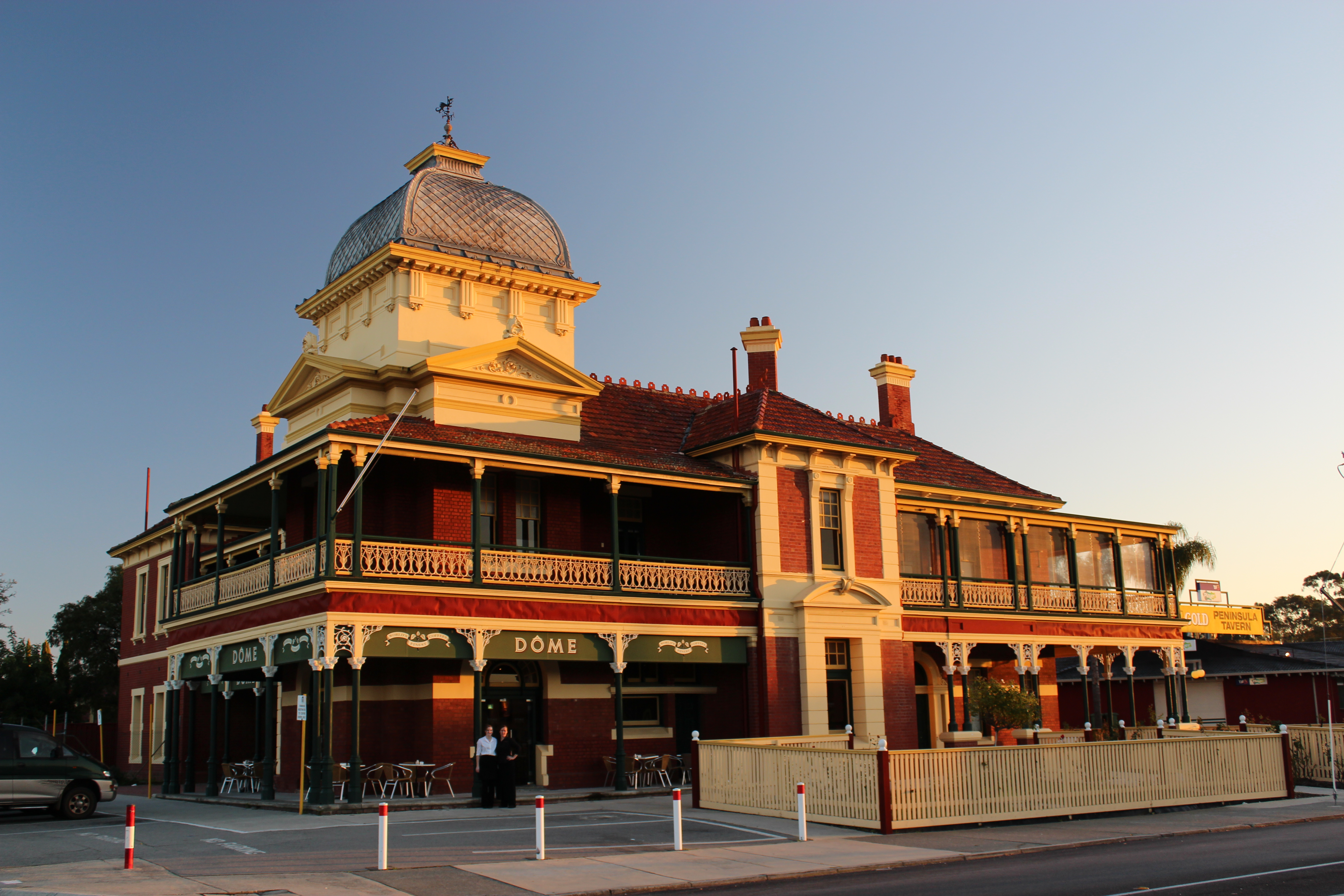
- Peninsula Hotel in Maylands, now a Dôme cafe
- Interactive map of the Peninsula Hotel area

General information
- Type: Heritage listed building
- Location: Maylands, Western Australia
- Coordinates: 31°55′41″S 115°53′29″E

Western Australia Heritage Register
- Type: State Registered Place
- Designated: 23 September 1994
- Reference no.: 2423

The Peninsula Hotel is a heritage-listed former hotel in Maylands, Western Australia. Located at 221 Railway Parade opposite Maylands railway station, it was constructed in 1906 by owner Friederich Liebe. The historic Edwardian-style hotel was saved from demolition in the 1970s, becoming a space for several community groups, and later a Dôme cafe.

== History ==
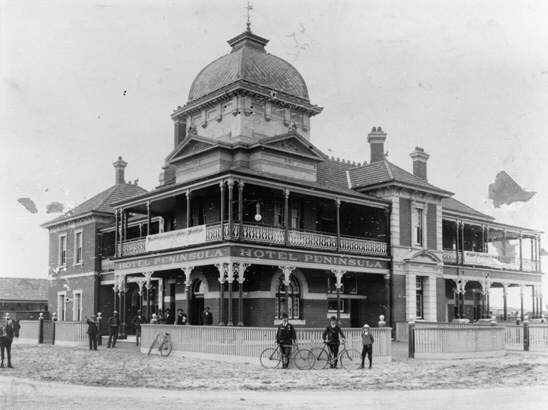
The hotel on its opening day in 1906

The Peninsula Hotel was constructed in 1906 to serve the rapidly growing population of Maylands. The area had flourished following the opening of a station on the Midland railway line, around 1898–1899, which serviced Mephan Ferguson's factory that made pipes for the Goldfields Water Supply Scheme. The builder and owner of the hotel was Friederich Liebe, a well-known builder who had previously worked on Queen's Hall and His Majesty's Theatre. By April 1906 construction was well underway, as noted by the local press.

The hotel was a well-known landmark in the 1920s and 1930s. It was the start and end points of the Beverley to Perth Cycle Race, initiated by Percy Armstrong. Liebe owned the hotel until his death in 1950, when it became Albert Klein's per Liebe's will. It was soon bought by the Swan Brewery Company in April 1952.

By the 1970s, the ageing Peninsula Hotel was in need of renovations. Swan Brewery decided in 1973 to build a new tavern on the adjacent site, to better cater for the modern drinking culture. They planned to demolish the hotel, and replace it with a car park. The Western Australian branch of the National Trust of Australia attempted to convince the company in mid-1973 to preserve the historic hotel, but failed to do so. The Peninsula Association, an independent group of people interested in conserving the hotel, formed around this time; in 1974, following a large public meeting, the association got the company to agree to postpone demolition, pending a feasible proposal for the building preservation and future use. This is one of the earliest examples in Perth of a historic building being saved through public outrage.

The hotel was classified by the National Trust on 16 September 1974, and given a permanent entry on the Register of the National Estate on 21 March 1978. It was listed on the State Register of Heritage Places on 23 September 1994, by which time the building was in use as the base of multiple community groups "for social activities and community development". The building was also listed on the City of Stirling's municipal inventory on 17 June 1997, and transferred to the City of Bayswater (along with the suburb of Maylands) on 1 July 1998.

Dôme Coffees Australia took over the hotel, as a cafe and their corporate headquarters. They won an award for the restoration in the 2013 Western Australian Heritage Awards.
