= Patria Jafferies =

Australian business executive

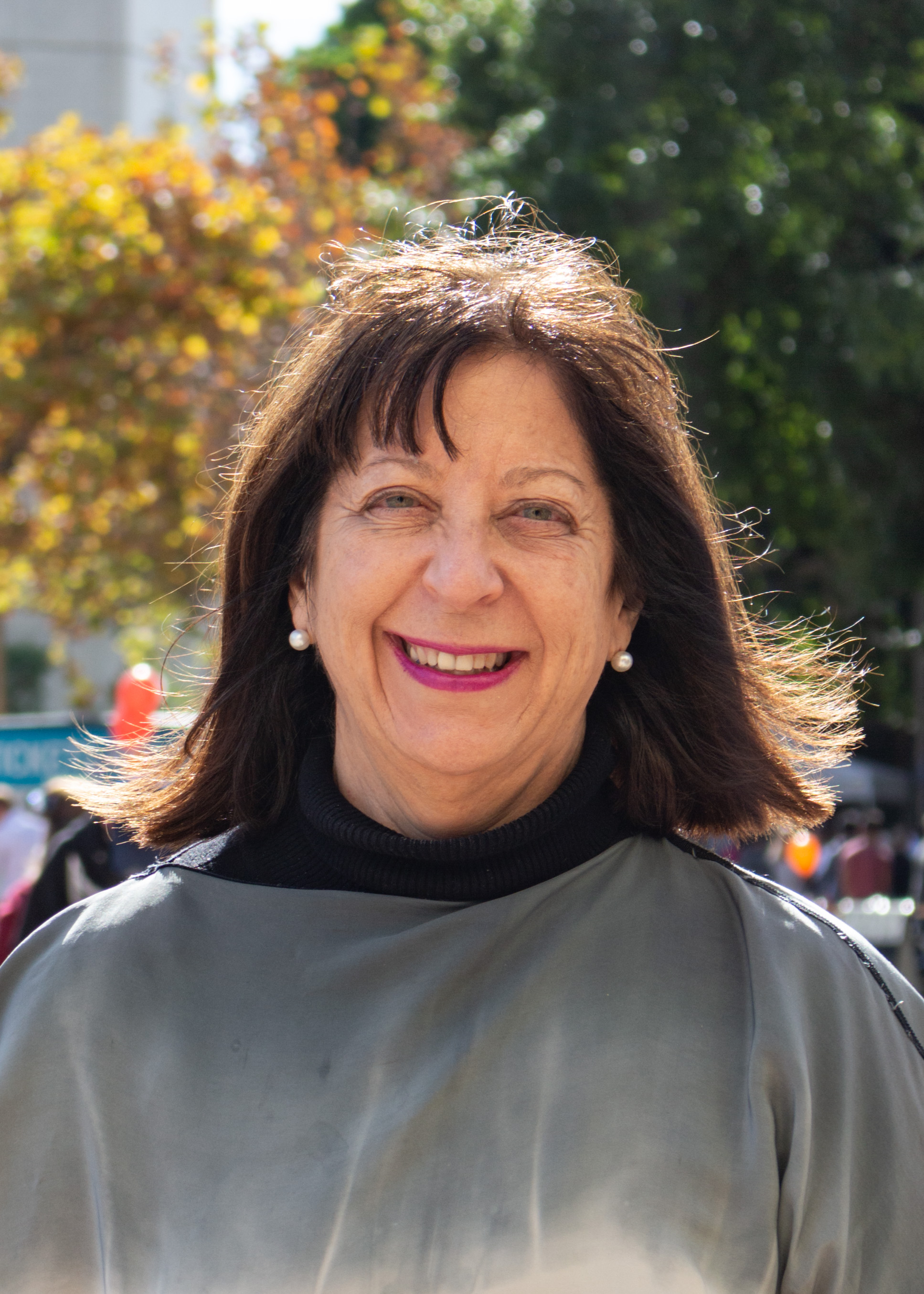
- Jafferies in June 2015
- Born: Patria Michelle Jafferies; October 27, 1952 (age 73); San Jose, California, U.S.
- Education: San Jose State University
- Occupation: Businesswoman
- Known for: Co-founder of Dôme

Patria Michelle Jafferies (born October 27, 1952) is an American-Australian businesswoman and restaurant owner. Jafferies is known for being the co-founder of Dôme Coffees Australia, and previously served as an executive director of Celebrate WA: a nonprofit organization that organises Western Australia Day celebrations. Jafferies is credited with being an influential figure in Perth's coffee culture, making it part of daily life.

== Early life ==
Jafferies was born in San Jose, California to retired Navy officer Malcolm C. Jafferies and Josephine Giuffre. Jafferies has three sisters, one of which is a fraternal twin.

Jafferies grew up in Cupertino, California and attended and graduated from Cupertino High School in 1970. A couple of Jafferies' former high school classmates described her as a "neat, neat person" and "the type of lady who used to go next door and cut her neighbor's roses." Jafferies later attended and graduated from San Jose State University.

=== Involvement in Garden City Casino skimming scandal ===
On May 5, 1987, Jafferies was indicted, by the Santa Clara County grand jury, with three felonies: one count of conspiracy to commit a crime and two counts of filing false individual tax returns. Jafferies used to work at Garden City Casino as a secretary and bookkeeper for three years. Several months before her indictment, Jafferies was among many of the casino's employees served with a subpoena from the Santa Clara County grand jury regarding "possibly disguised contributions" from the casino and its employees to San Jose city council members and San Jose's locally-elected officials where the grand jury alleges that Jafferies was given "instructions to donate to designated candidates" directed by the casino's owners. Jafferies testified and pleaded the 5th to the allegations and left for Australia. Three years later, Jafferies was granted witness immunity by the Santa Clara County District Attorney's office and, thus, agreed to come back to California. In other words, the prosecution would drop, and has dropped, all charges against Jafferies in exchange for her testimony as a witness in the scandal.

== Dôme ==
Jafferies moved to Perth, Western Australia in 1986, where she worked for the Matilda Bay Brewing Company. In 1989, Jafferies met Phil May. Both became business partners, along with Phil Sexton from the Matilda Bay Brewing Company, and started Dôme Coffees Australia in 1990 and opening the first Dôme cafe in Cottesloe in 1991.

The initial Dôme cafe quickly became successful, despite the controversial amount, $1.80, charged for a cup of coffee.

Dôme expanded into an international company that imported, roasted, and exported coffee beans, as well as becoming a franchise chain of cafes in Australia, South East Asia (i.e. The Philippines, Malaysia, Indonesia), and the Middle East (i.e. United Arab Emirates).

Jafferies was a finalist in the 1997 Ethnic Business Awards. At the time, she said the vision for Dôme was "to be internationally recognized as the best coffee roaster in the world", and was inspired her father's slogan "make a difference".

In 2000, Jafferies won the Telstra Australian Business Woman of the Year award for her efforts growing Dôme. The company recorded $68 million total revenue, had a total of "59 stores around the world", and sold 2.5 tons of coffee per week.

By the end of the decade Dôme was a multi-million dollar business, and by the end of 2003 had approximately 100 stores across nine countries. In December 2003 Jafferies and May sold it to private equity funded executives – Sexton had been bought out several years prior.

== Later years ==
Jafferies later became a consultant. She also became involved with charitable and artistic organisations.

Jafferies was the executive director of Celebrate WA from c. 2012/13 to early 2015.

Jafferies was recognized as one of the most influential Western Australian businesspeople in The West Australian's 2013 list of the 100 most influential.
