= Mount Lawley railway station =

Railway station in Perth, Western Australia

Mount Lawley
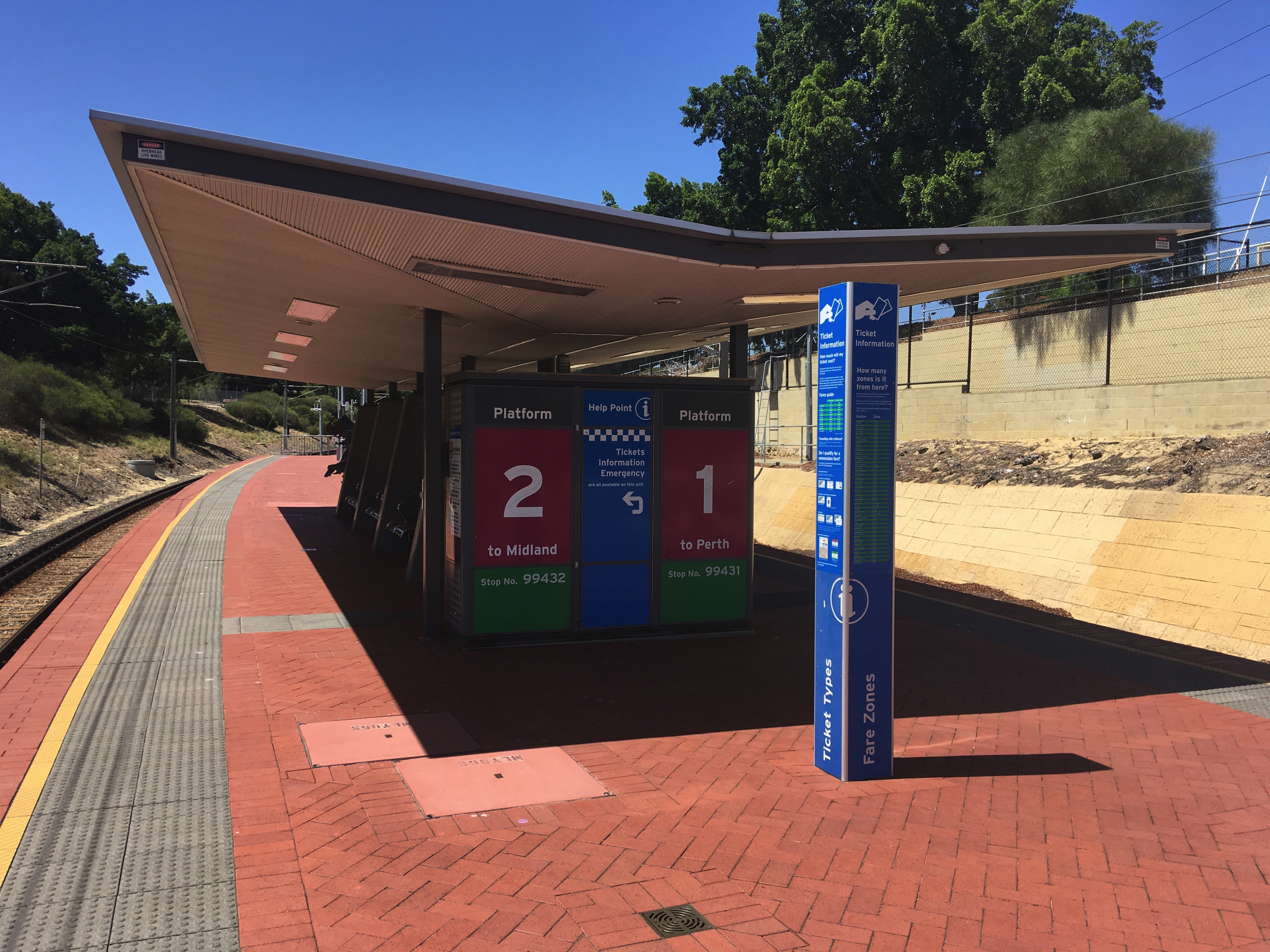
- North-east bound view from Platform 2, showing the island platform shelter, February 2021

General information
- Location: Whatley Crescent, Railway Parade, Almondbury Road; Mount Lawley; Western Australia; Australia
- Coordinates: 31°56′05″S 115°52′51″E
- Owner: Public Transport Authority
- Operator: Transperth Train Operations
- Lines: Airport line Ellenbrook line Midland line
- Distance: 3.2 km (2.0 mi) from Perth
- Platforms: 2 (1 island)

Other information
- Station code: MML
- Fare zone: 1

History
- Opened: 1907
- Rebuilt: 1968

Passengers
- 2013–14: 108,612

Services
Preceding station	Transperth	Following station
East Perth towards Perth	Midland line	Maylands towards Midland
East Perth towards Perth or Claremont	Airport line	Maylands towards High Wycombe
East Perth towards Perth	Ellenbrook line	Maylands towards Ellenbrook
Location
- Location of Mount Lawley station

Mount Lawley railway station is 3.2 kilometres (2.0 mi) from Perth railway station, in Western Australia, on the Midland, Airport, and Ellenbrook lines on the Transperth commuter rail network.

== History ==
The original station was built in 1907, and was demolished and rebuilt in 1968. Originally called Fenian's Crossing, the original station was positioned on the embankment between the subway and where the current station is located.

The station was significantly upgraded in 2012, as part of Public Transport Authority works to bring a number of Perth's railway stations into line with accessibility and safety standards. The upgrade included a resurfacing of the platform and access ramp, a new platform shelter, as well as upgrades to handrails, lighting and signage.

== Location ==
Mount Lawley station is located on the eastern edge of Mount Lawley, about 300 metres (980 ft) from the Swan River. The railway's right of way lies between two major roads, Railway Parade and Whatley Crescent. There is one access point on each of these roads to the station, meeting on the western end of the platform at a ramp that leads down to the boarding area. Guildford Road is located approximately 150 metres (490 ft) from the station, providing direct road access to central Perth as well.

== Rail services ==
Mount Lawley railway station is served by the Midland line on the Transperth network. This line goes between Midland railway station and Perth railway station. Since 10 October 2022 it is also served by the Airport line. The Airport line goes between High Wycombe station and Claremont station. Since 8 December 2024 it is also served by the Ellenbrook line. The Ellenbrook line goes between Ellenbrook railway station and Perth railway station. Midland line, Airport line, and Ellenbrook line trains stop at the station every 10 minutes during peak on weekdays, and every 15 minutes during the day outside peak every day of the year except Christmas Day. Trains are half-hourly or hourly at night time. The station saw 108,612 passengers in the 2013-14 financial year.

=== Platforms ===
Mount Lawley platform arrangement
Stop ID	Platform	Line	Stopping Pattern	Destination	Via	Notes
99431	1	Airport line	All stations	Claremont	Perth	
99431	1	Ellenbrook line Midland line	All stations	Perth		
99432	2	Airport line	All stations	High Wycombe		
99432	2	Ellenbrook line	All stations	Ellenbrook		
99432	2	Midland line	All stations	Midland		

== Bus routes ==
Stop	Route	Destination / description	Notes
Whatley Crescent (south-west bound)	901, 902, 903	Train replacement service to Perth	
Whatley Crescent (north-east bound)	901	Train replacement service to Midland	
Whatley Crescent (north-east bound)	902	Train replacement service to High Wycombe	
Whatley Crescent (north-east bound)	903	Train replacement service to Ellenbrook	
