= Meltham railway station =

Railway station in Perth, Western Australia

Meltham
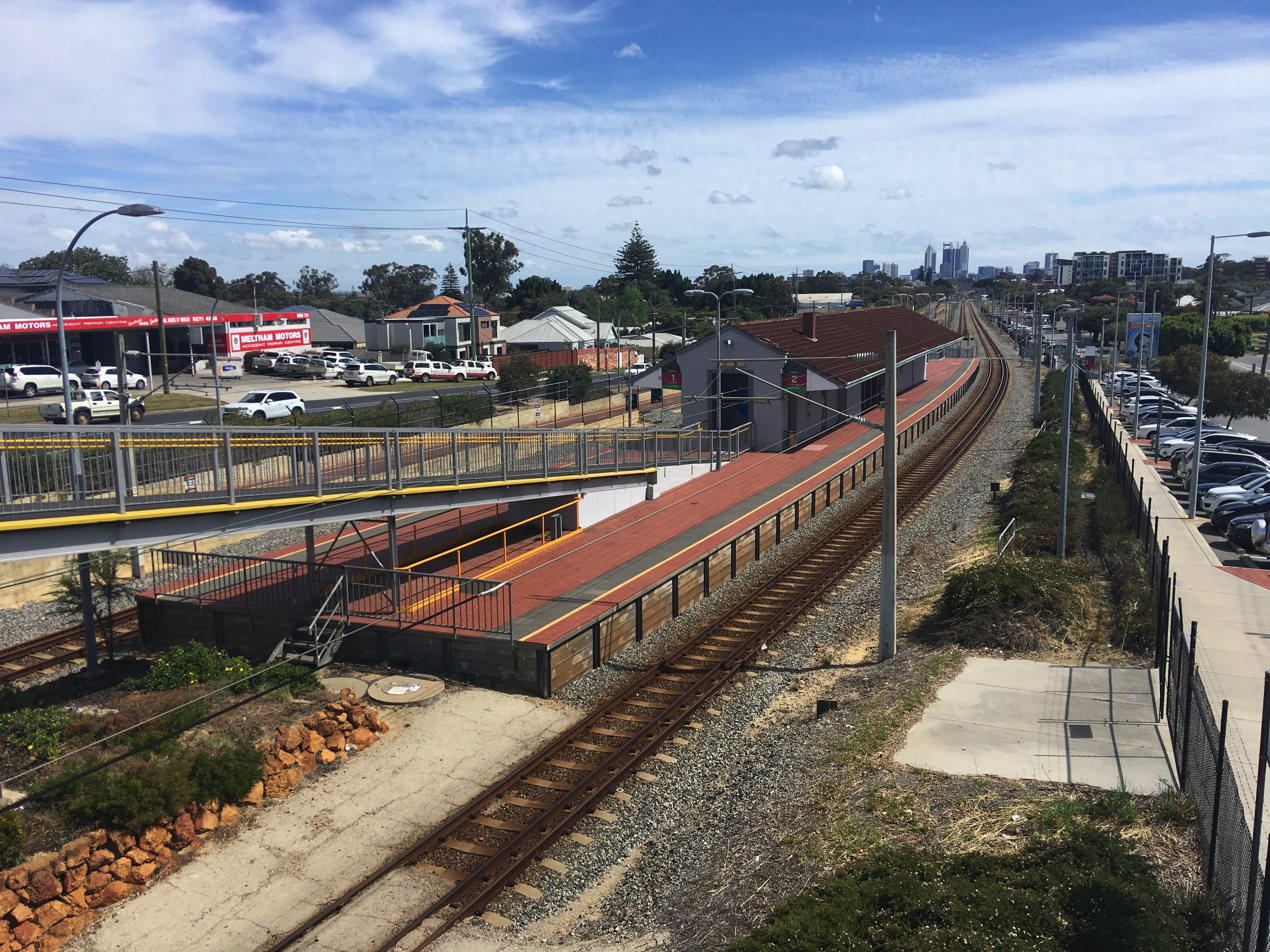
- Westbound view of Platform 2 viewed from the pedestrian overpass, October 2020

General information
- Location: Whatley Crescent, Railway Parade, Grand Promenade; Bayswater, Western Australia; Australia
- Coordinates: 31°55′21″S 115°54′01″E
- Owner: Public Transport Authority
- Operator: Public Transport Authority
- Lines: Airport line Ellenbrook line Midland line
- Distance: 5.5 km (3.4 mi) from Perth
- Platforms: 1 island platform with 2 platform edges

Construction
- Parking: Yes
- Accessible: Partial

Other information
- Fare zone: 1

History
- Opened: 14 May 1948

Passengers
- 2013-14: 169,432

Services
Preceding station	Transperth	Following station
Maylands towards Perth	Midland line	Bayswater towards Midland
Maylands towards Perth or Claremont	Airport line	Bayswater towards High Wycombe
Maylands towards Perth	Ellenbrook line	Bayswater towards Ellenbrook
Location
- Location of Meltham station

Meltham railway station is a railway station in Bayswater, a suburb of Perth, Western Australia. It is on the Midland, Airport, and Ellenbrook lines between Maylands and Bayswater. It is 5.5 kilometres (2.8 mi), or 10 minutes by train, from Perth railway station. Services run every 6 minutes during peak and every 7.5 minutes between peak.

The station was built during the late 1940s, after first being promised in 1898, and after decades of campaigning by residents and the Bayswater Road Board. The station underwent a refurbishment in 2012. Development of higher density buildings around Meltham station has been a contentious issue since the mid 2010s. The Airport line opened on 9 October 2022, and the Ellenbrook line opened on 8 December 2024.

== Description ==
Meltham railway station is in the Perth suburb of Bayswater, Western Australia. It is located between Whatley Crescent to the south, and Railway Parade to the north. Just to the east is the Hotham Street bridge over the railway. To the north is the intersection of Railway Parade and Grand Promenade. It is 5.5 kilometres (3.4 mi), or a 10 minute train journey from Perth along the Midland line. The adjacent railway stations are Maylands towards Perth, or Bayswater towards Midland.

The station consists of a single island platform with two platform faces. The platform is approximately 98 metres (322 ft) long, or long enough for a Transperth 4 car train, but not long enough for a 6 car train. The track through the station is dual gauge. Transperth services operate on narrow gauge; standard gauge trains do not stop at the station. At the west end of the platform is a pedestrian level crossing for access to the station. At the east end of the platform is a footbridge connected to the platform by a ramp.

== History ==
=== Early history ===
A station at this location was first promised in 1898. A signal box at this location was built in 1913.

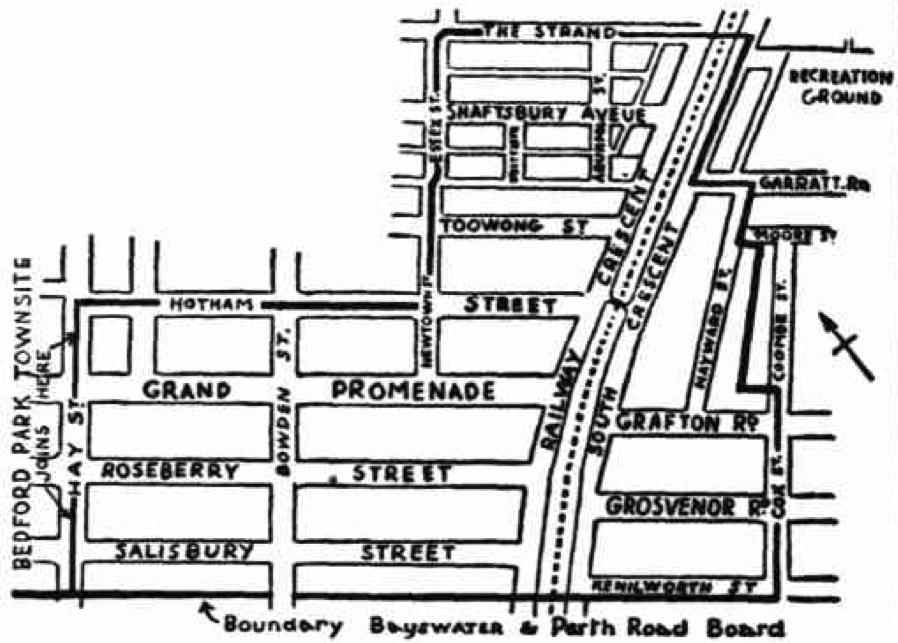
Meltham Heights townsite map published in The West Australian on 27 July 1937

In 1937, the townsite of Meltham Heights was gazetted, consisting of the area around Hotham Street. Transport for Meltham Heights was an issue. With the area being working class, car ownership was uncommon. Residents and the Bayswater Road Board (now the City of Bayswater) agitated for a railway station.

Bayswater and its surrounding suburbs' population surged following the end of World War II. Housing construction, which was non-existent during the war, proceeded at a rapid rate post-war. Development occurred in Meltham Heights, and construction of the station there finally began in 1947. Shortages of labour and materials prevented the station's completion until 1949, however, with the station partially completed, the eastern 180 feet (55 m) opened on 14 June 1948.

=== Modern day ===
In 2012, Meltham station was upgraded to comply with accessibility and safety requirements. This included resurfacing the platform, an extension to the car park and public art. The upgrade cost $2 million.

In 2016, the Public Transport Authority said that closing stations with low patronage was a possibility. On a typical weekday, 524 passengers use Meltham station. The Public Transport Authority later said that there were no immediate plans to close the station, in response to fears that Meltham would be closed.

Increased building density is a contentious issue around Meltham. Currently, Meltham is surrounded by 1 to 2-storey buildings. In 2017, City of Bayswater councillors voted against the Meltham precinct structure plan, which would have resulted in six-storey apartments on some roads near the station. However, the Western Australian Planning Commission overruled the council.

In 2019 and 2020, the City of Bayswater proposed that a new suburb named Meltham be created, covering the area around Meltham railway station. The purpose of the suburb was to give the area its own identity, as currently it is overshadowed by the rest of Bayswater. Councillors decided in May 2020 to not proceed with the proposed renaming.

Construction to add 100 bays to the northern carpark at Meltham station started in February 2020. This is due to the 180 bays that were permanently removed at Bayswater station in late 2020 due to the construction of the new Bayswater station. The new car bays opened in October 2020.

In 2024, Meltham station was identified as one of three stations to have its platform extended to 150 metres (490 ft) as part of phase one of the platform and signalling upgrade program to allow for six-car trains on the Ellenbrook line.

== Rail services ==
Meltham railway station is served by the Midland, Airport, and Ellenbrook lines on the Transperth network. The Midland line goes between Midland and Perth, the Airport line goes between High Wycombe and Claremont, and the Ellenbrook line goes between Ellenbrook and Perth. Midland line trains stop at the station every 10 minutes during peak on weekdays, and every 15 minutes during the day outside peak every day of the year except Christmas Day. Trains are half-hourly or hourly at night time. The station saw 169,432 passengers in the 2013-14 financial year.

=== Platforms ===
Meltham platform arrangement
Stop ID	Platform	Line	Stopping Pattern	Destination	Via	Notes
99451	1	Airport line	All stations	Claremont	Perth	
99451	1	Ellenbrook line Midland line	All stations	Perth		
99452	2	Airport line	All stations	High Wycombe		
99452	2	Ellenbrook line	All stations	Ellenbrook		
99452	2	Midland line	All stations	Midland		

== Bus routes ==
During the temporary closure of Bayswater station between March and October 2023, the CircleRoute bus route deviated via Meltham station to still allow for a train transfer, stopping at bus stops on Grand Promenade. A free shuttle bus, route 44, operated between Meltham and Bayswater stations as well.

== Gallery ==
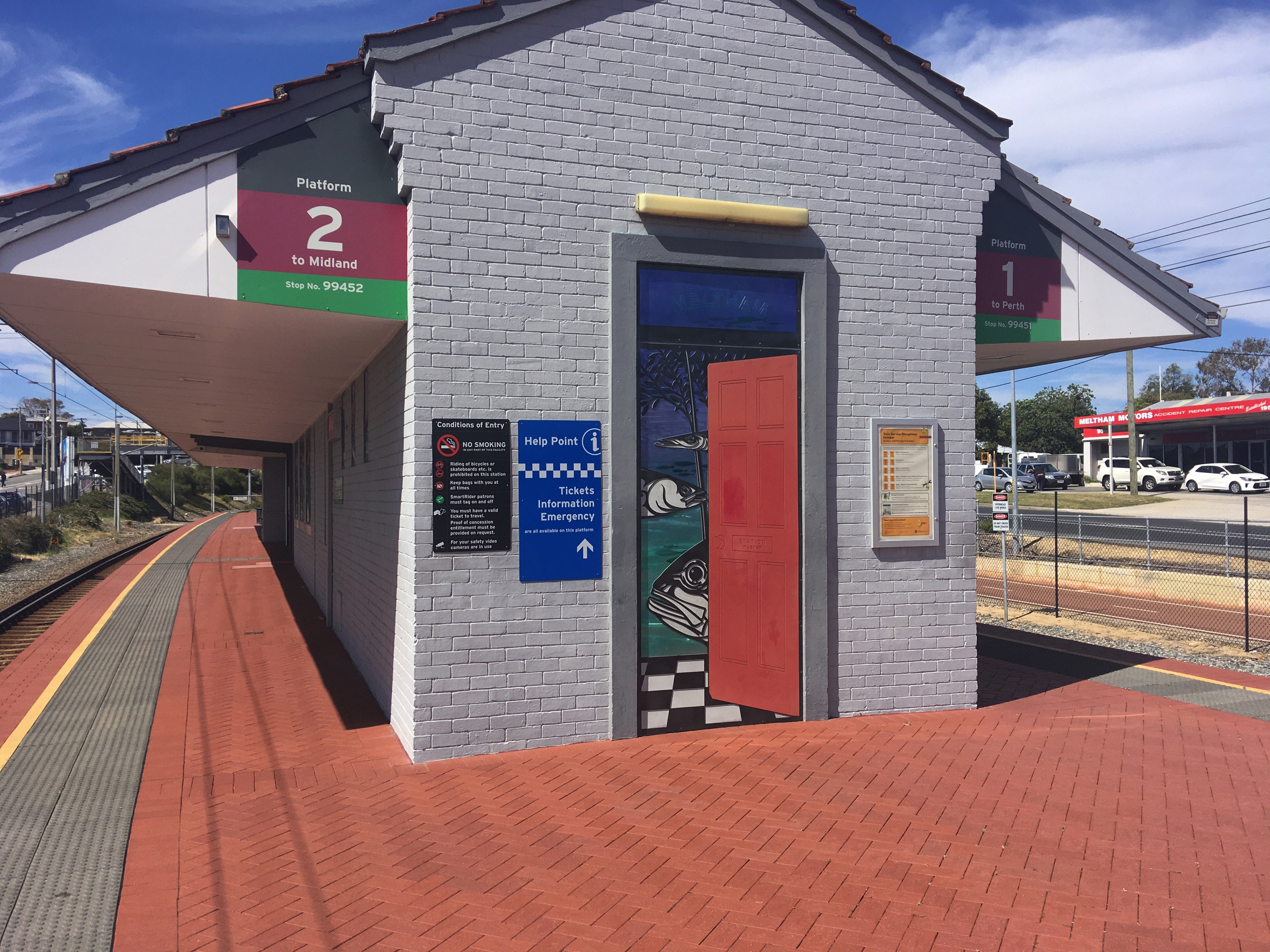
Western end of Meltham station

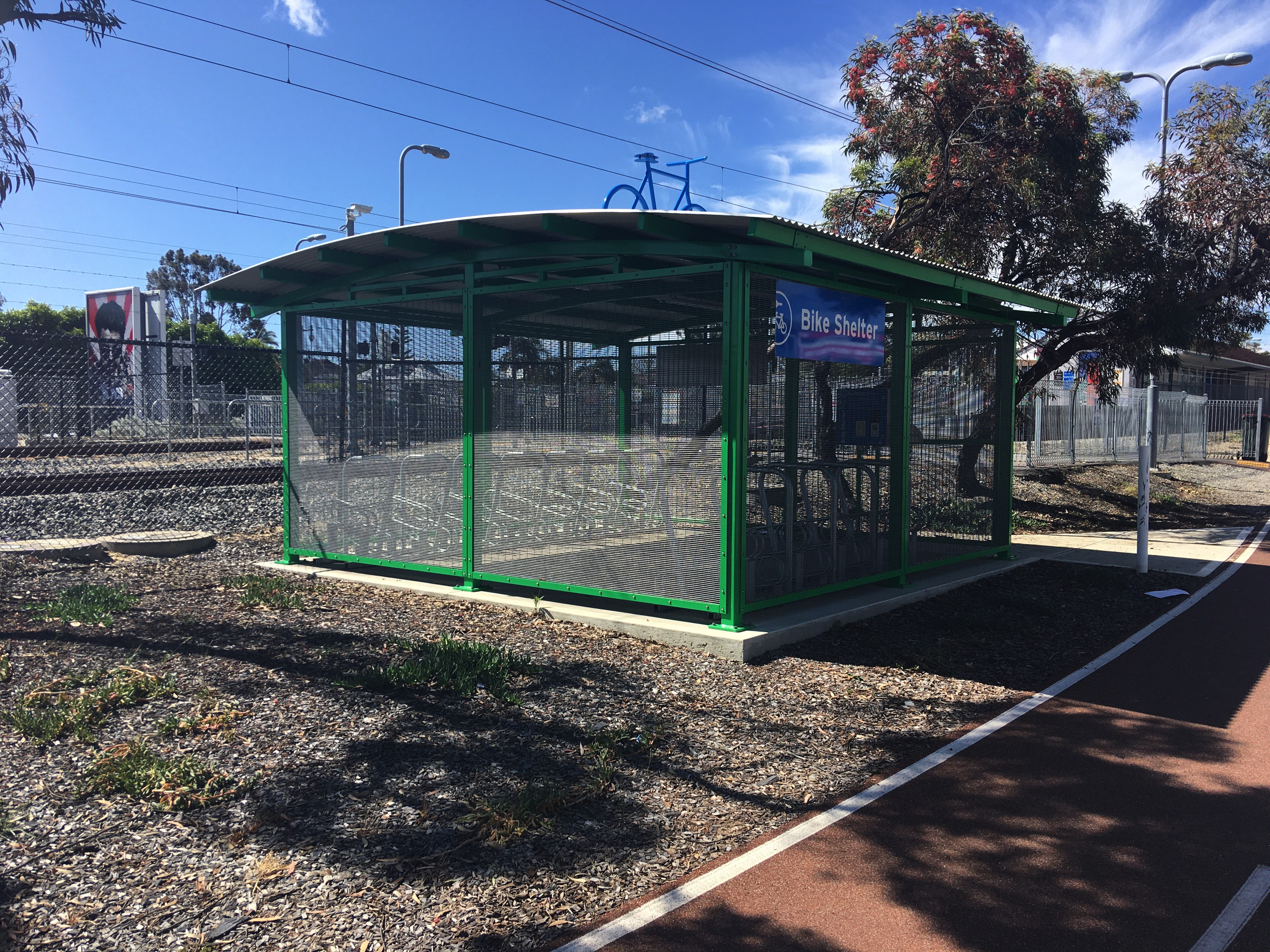
Bike shelter constructed in 2019

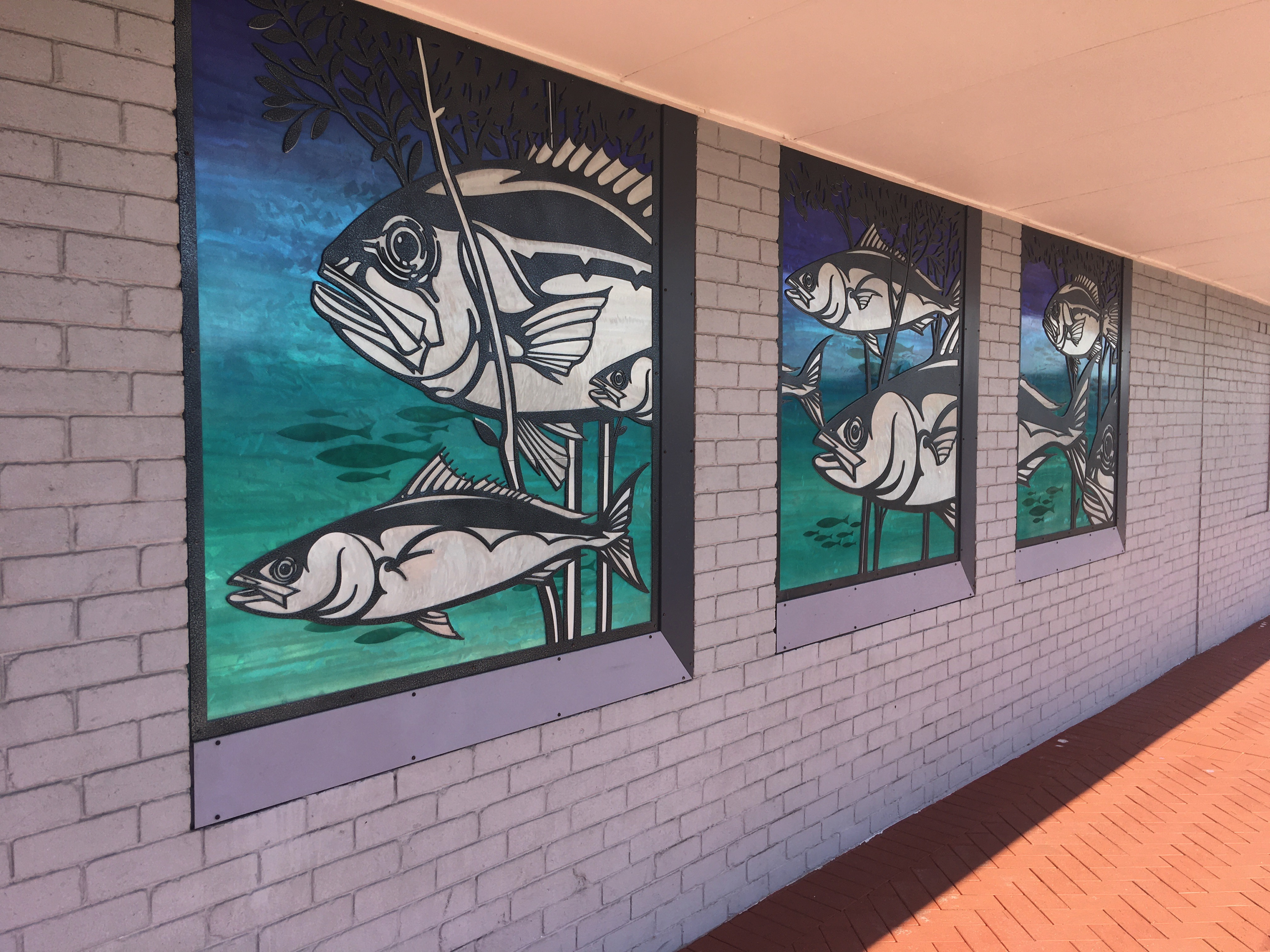
Public art, added during station upgrade in 2012

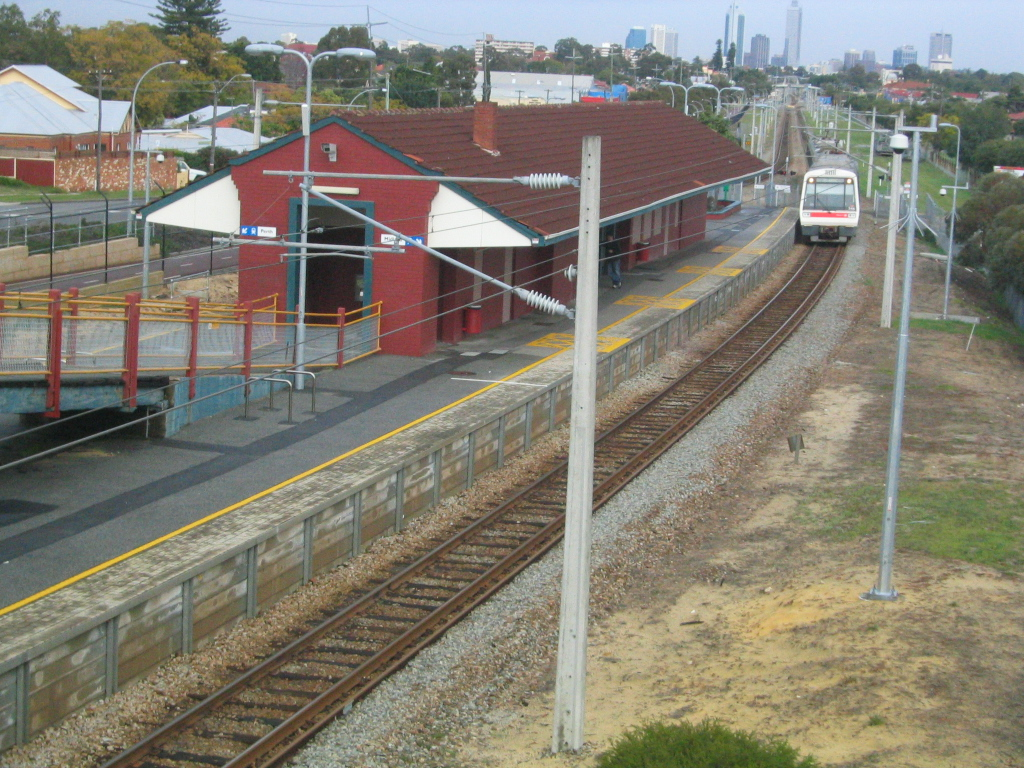
Meltham railway station in 2005

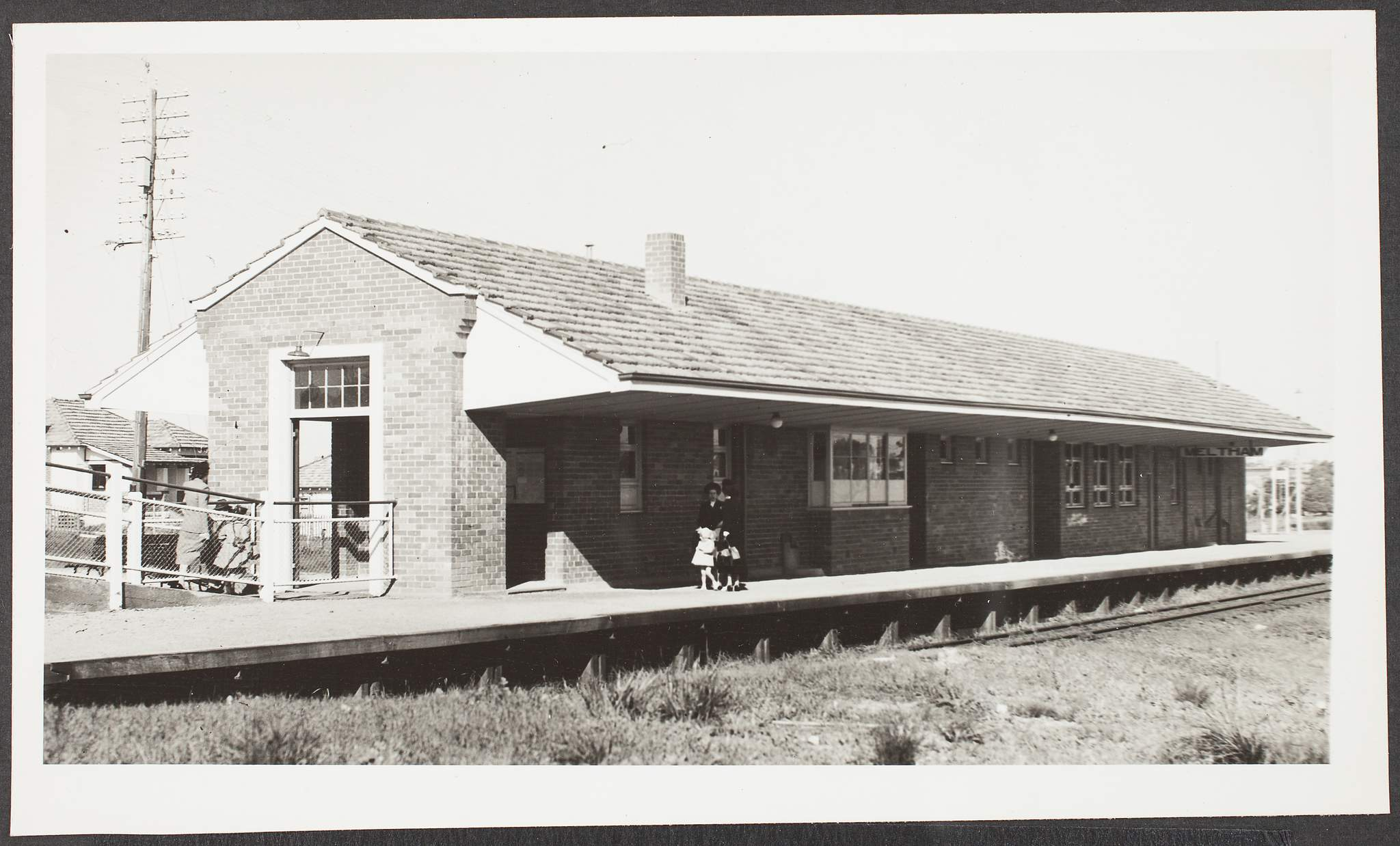
Meltham railway station in 1949, One year after opening
