= Halliday House =

Heritage listed house in Western Australia

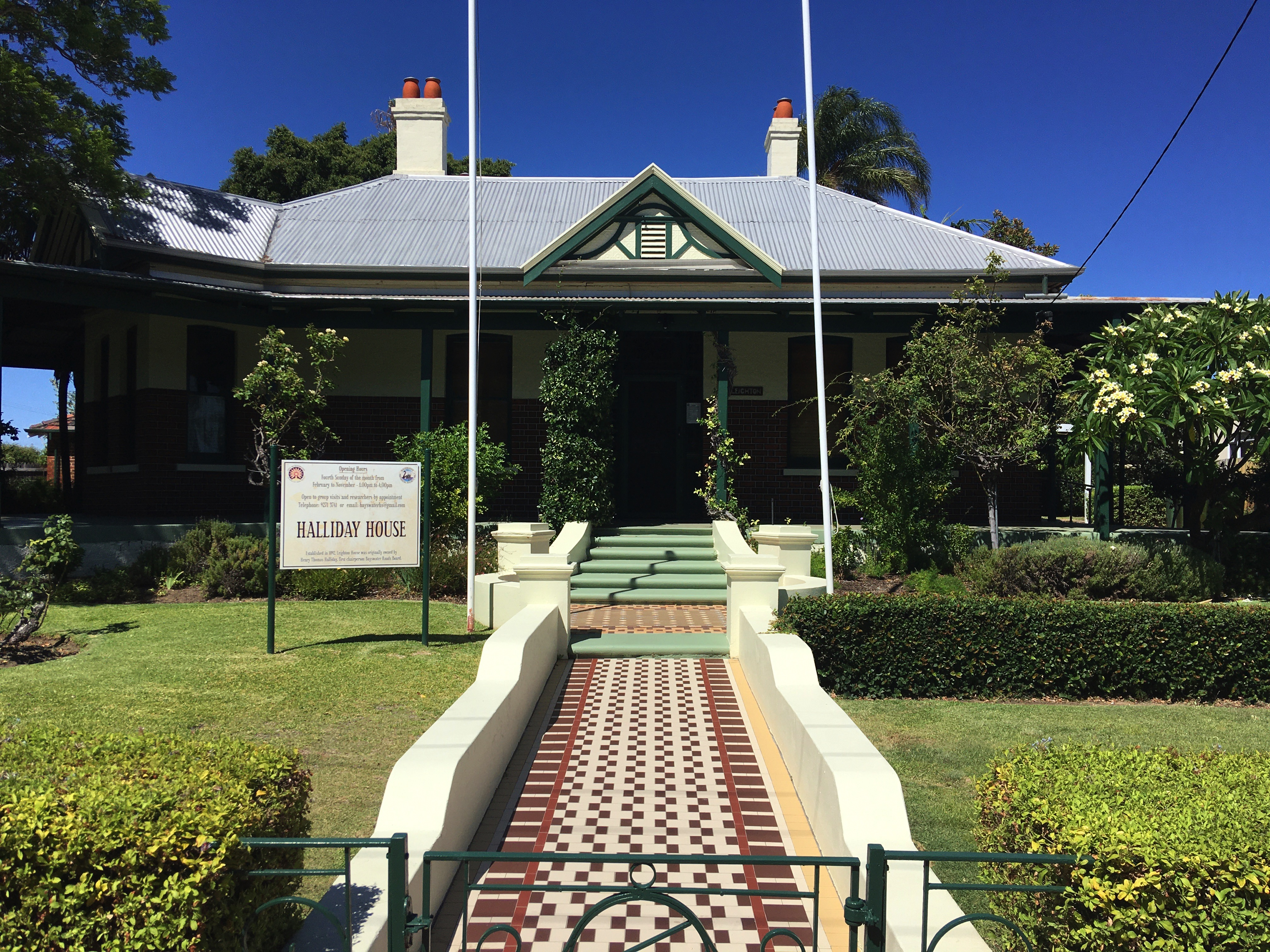
- Halliday House front exterior from street, January 2021
- Former names: Leighton
- Etymology: Halliday family

General information
- Type: Heritage listed building
- Architectural style: Queen Anne Federation architecture
- Location: 114 King William Street, Bayswater, Western Australia
- Coordinates: 31.9256°S 115.9194°E
- Completed: c. 1892
- Owner: City of Bayswater

Western Australia Heritage Register
- Type: State Registered Place
- Designated: 23 June 2000
- Reference no.: 3260

Halliday House is a heritage listed house in the Perth suburb of Bayswater, Western Australia, currently operating as a museum. It is the oldest house in Bayswater that is still standing.

== History ==
In 1888, James Halliday bought a 4.0-hectare (10-acre) block of land on what would become King William Street. In 1893, construction started on Halliday House. The house is said to have been constructed by James's son, Henry Thomas Halliday. However it is more probable that it was built by another family member who was a builder, as Henry was working in the family business at the time. At the time, the building stood out from most other buildings in Bayswater, because it was made of brick, as opposed to the more commonly used corrugated iron or timber weatherboard. The timber used was transported by rail between Fremantle and Bayswater, and by horse-drawn cart between the railway line and the building site. The bricks were probably made by a local brick manufacturer, as there were a few in the area at the time.

At first, the house was named Leighton, after Leighton Buzzard, England, the birthplace of Henry's wife Edith. The Halliday family moved into the house in August 1893, whilst it was still under construction. It is not known when the house was completed. When the Bayswater Roads Board was established in 1897, their first meeting was in the house. Henry Halliday was the first chairman of the board. After Henry and Edith Halliday died, the house continued to be inhabited by some of their children.

In 1984, the house was sold to Lionel Johnson and Kingsley Dixon, leaving the hands of the Halliday family for the first time since the house was built. The Halliday family offered to sell it to the City of Bayswater for $110,000, but due to the City delaying organising the purchase, it was sold to Johnson and Dixon. At this time, the garden was overgrown and the house was deteriorating. Dixon, who is a well known botanist, restored the garden and house.

In 1992, Halliday House was purchased by the City of Bayswater so that the building could be preserved. The City paid $299,000. The City opened up to expressions of interest from people and community groups for use of Halliday House. The Bayswater Historical Society was successful in their application, and they opened Halliday House in 1993 as a museum. In 1994, Halliday House was placed on the State Register of Heritage Places.

Presently Halliday House is open between 1 pm and 4 pm on the fourth Sunday of each month. The Bayswater Historical Society cleans the house, and the City of Bayswater is responsible for maintenance.

== Description ==
Halliday House is a single-story brick house. It is built in the Queen Anne Federation architectural style. A verandah, originally made of timber wraps around the house on all four sides. It was replaced with concrete at an unknown date. Three chimneys extend out of the roof. A decorative path leads up to the front door. Most of the plants currently present were planted there by Dixon in the late 1980s and early 1990s.

== See also ==
- Kingsley Dixon
- List of State Register of Heritage Places in the City of Bayswater
