= Dôme (coffeehouse) =

Australian chain of European-style café restaurants

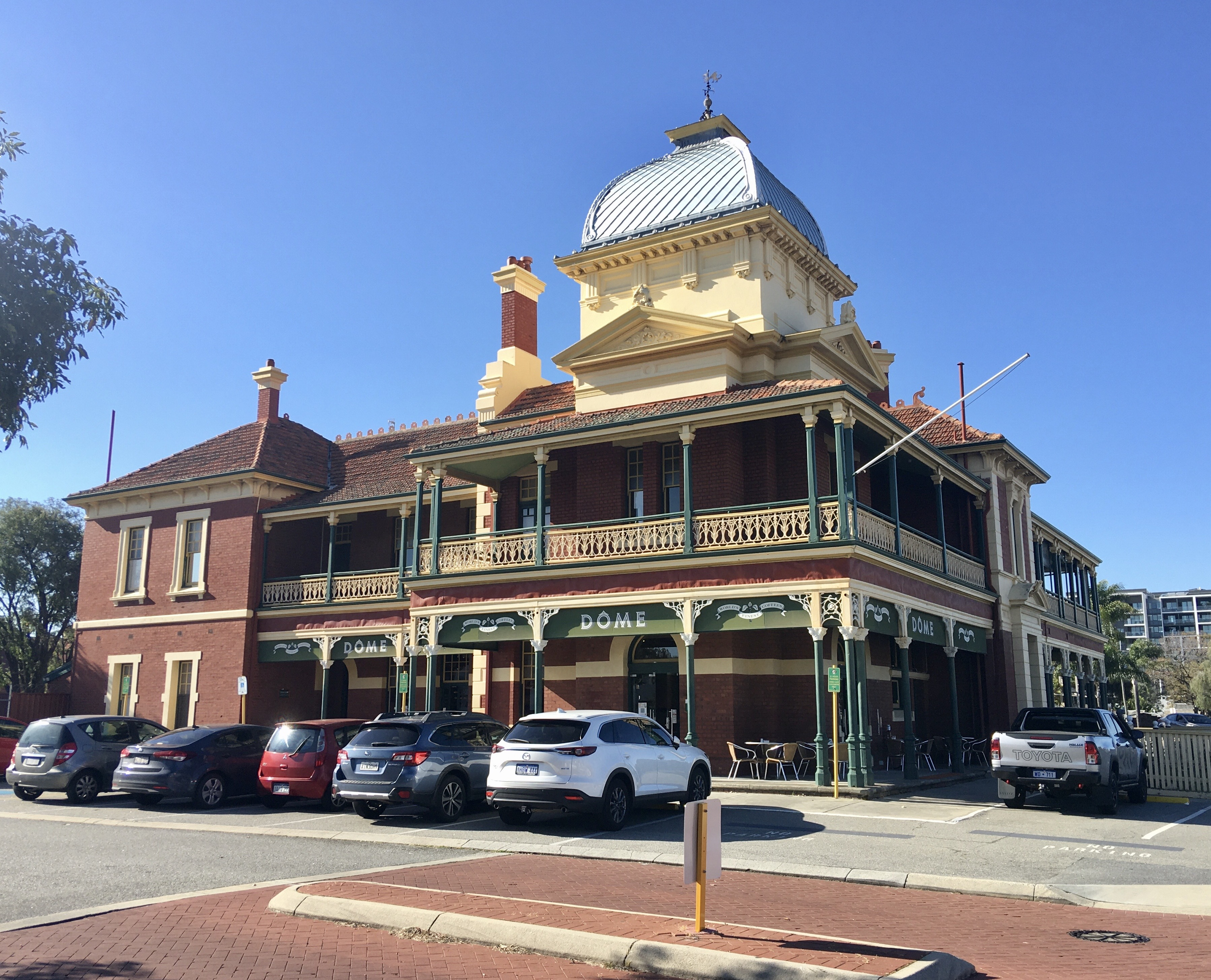
- Dôme corporate headquarters
- Industry: Foodservice
- Founded: 1990; 36 years ago
- Founders: Patria Jafferies; Phil May; Phil Sexton
- Headquarters: Maylands, Western Australia, Australia

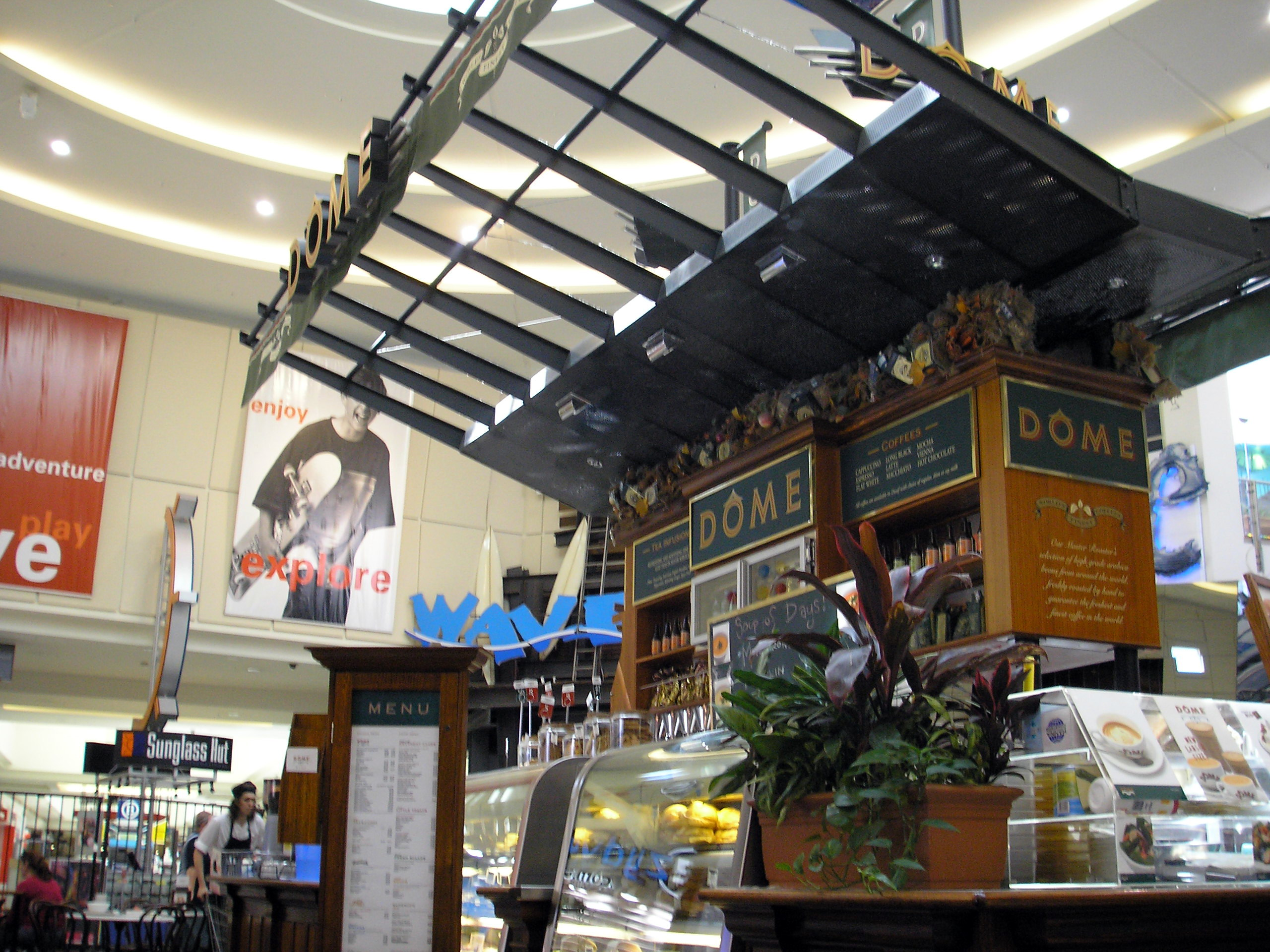
A Dôme cafe formerly located in Westfield Carousel, Cannington, Australia

Dôme is a franchise chain of European-style café restaurants based in Perth, Western Australia.

It has over 50 cafés in Australia. Most are in Western Australia, although Dôme has also had multiple cafes in Darwin, and in Tasmania.

Dôme locations outside Australia include or have included Japan, South Korea, United Arab Emirates, Indonesia, the Philippines, Malaysia, Bahrain, Thailand, and one in the Maldives (Hulhumale).

== History ==
Dôme was founded by Patria Jafferies, Phil May and Phil Sexton in 1990. The initial outlet was established in Napoleon Street, Cottesloe in the early 1990s.

By the early 2000s it was a significant player in the larger Australian market. By 2015, there were over 130 Dôme cafés, in about eight countries. The corporate headquarters are in the former Peninsula Hotel in the Perth suburb of Maylands.

== See also ==
- List of bakery cafés
- List of coffeehouse chains
