= Maylands railway station =

Railway station in Perth, Western Australia

Maylands
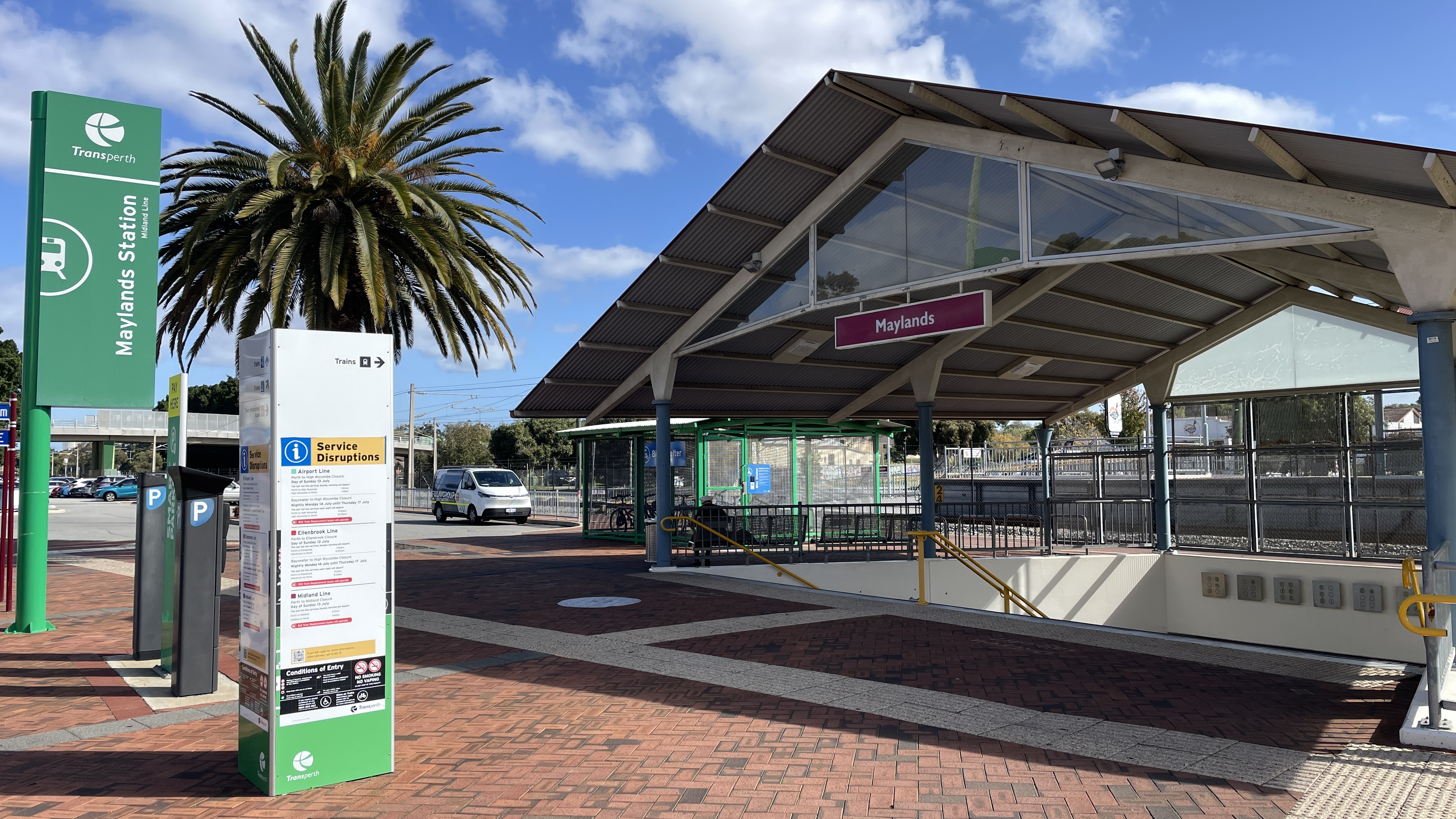
- Station entrance from Whatley Crescent, July 2025

General information
- Location: Whatley Crescent & Railway Parade & Eighth Avenue; Maylands, Western Australia; Australia
- Coordinates: 31°55′42″S 115°53′30″E
- Owner: Public Transport Authority
- Operator: Public Transport Authority
- Lines: Airport line Ellenbrook line Midland line
- Distance: 4.5 km (2.8 mi) from Perth
- Platforms: 1 island platform with 2 platform edges
- Tracks: 2

Construction
- Parking: Yes
- Cycle facilities: Yes
- Accessible: Yes

Other information
- Fare zone: 1

History
- Opened: 1 February 1900
- Former names: Falkirk

Passengers
- 2013–14: 503,370

Services
Preceding station	Transperth	Following station
Mount Lawley towards Perth	Midland line	Meltham towards Midland
Mount Lawley towards Perth or Claremont	Airport line	Meltham towards High Wycombe
Mount Lawley towards Perth	Ellenbrook line	Meltham towards Ellenbrook

Western Australia Heritage Register
- Official name: Maylands Parcel Office
- Type: State Registered Place
- Designated: 26 February 1999
- Reference no.: 4563
Location
- Location of Maylands station

Maylands railway station is a suburban rail station in Maylands, a suburb of Perth, Western Australia. It is on the Midland, Airport, and Ellenbrook lines, between Mount Lawley station and Meltham station. Maylands stationis 4.5 kilometres (2.8 mi), or eight minutes by train, from Perth station. Services on each line run every 12 minutes during peak and every 15 minutes between peak for a combined frequency of a train every 6 minutes during peak and every 7.5 minutes outside peak.

A siding at the station's site opened in 1896; the station itself officially opened on 1 February 1900 with two side platforms. It was rebuilt as an island platform in the mid- to late 1960s, as the Midland line was being converted from narrow gauge to dual gauge, which was not compatible with the side platforms. Maylands station underwent a refurbishment in 2001, in which disability access was improved and the station and surrounding area were beautified. Airport line services commenced on 9 October 2022 with Ellenbrook line services following on 8 December 2024.

== Description ==
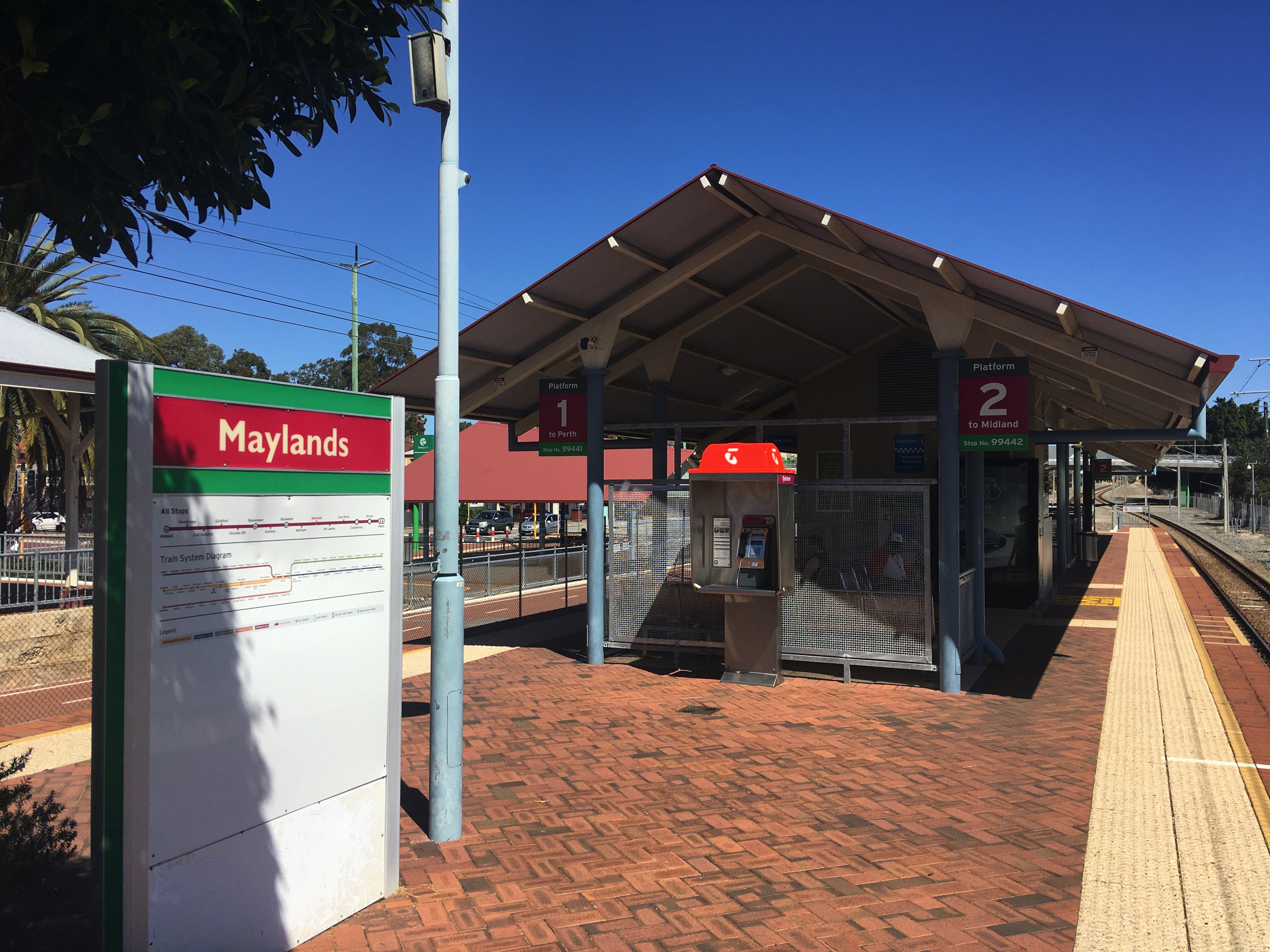
Maylands station platform in September 2021

Maylands station is in the Perth suburb of Maylands, Western Australia. It is located between Whatley Crescent to the south, and Railway Parade to the north, at the intersection of Eighth Avenue, in the Maylands town centre. It is 4.5 kilometres (2.8 mi), or an eight-minute train journey from Perth station. The adjacent stations are Mount Lawley towards Perth and Meltham towards Midland or High Wycombe. The station is within fare zone one.

The station consists of a single island platform with two platform faces. The platform is approximately 96 metres (315 ft) long, or long enough for a Transperth four-car train, but not long enough for a six-car train. The track through the station is dual gauge. Transperth services operate on narrow gauge; standard gauge trains do not stop at the station. At the west end of the platform is a pedestrian subway, accessible from the platform by stairs or a ramp. The subway links the platforms to both sides of the railway, and is the only entrance to the station. The station has a transit officer booth and a bike shelter. There are 81 Transperth parking bays.

== History ==
A siding opened in 1896 as "15 Mile Siding". It was known as "Falkirk" between 1897 and 1899, after Falkirk, Scotland, the birthplace of Mephan Ferguson. A small branch line existed near the station, which lead to the Ferguson Pipe Factory, located near the present day Ferguson Street and Caledonian Avenue.

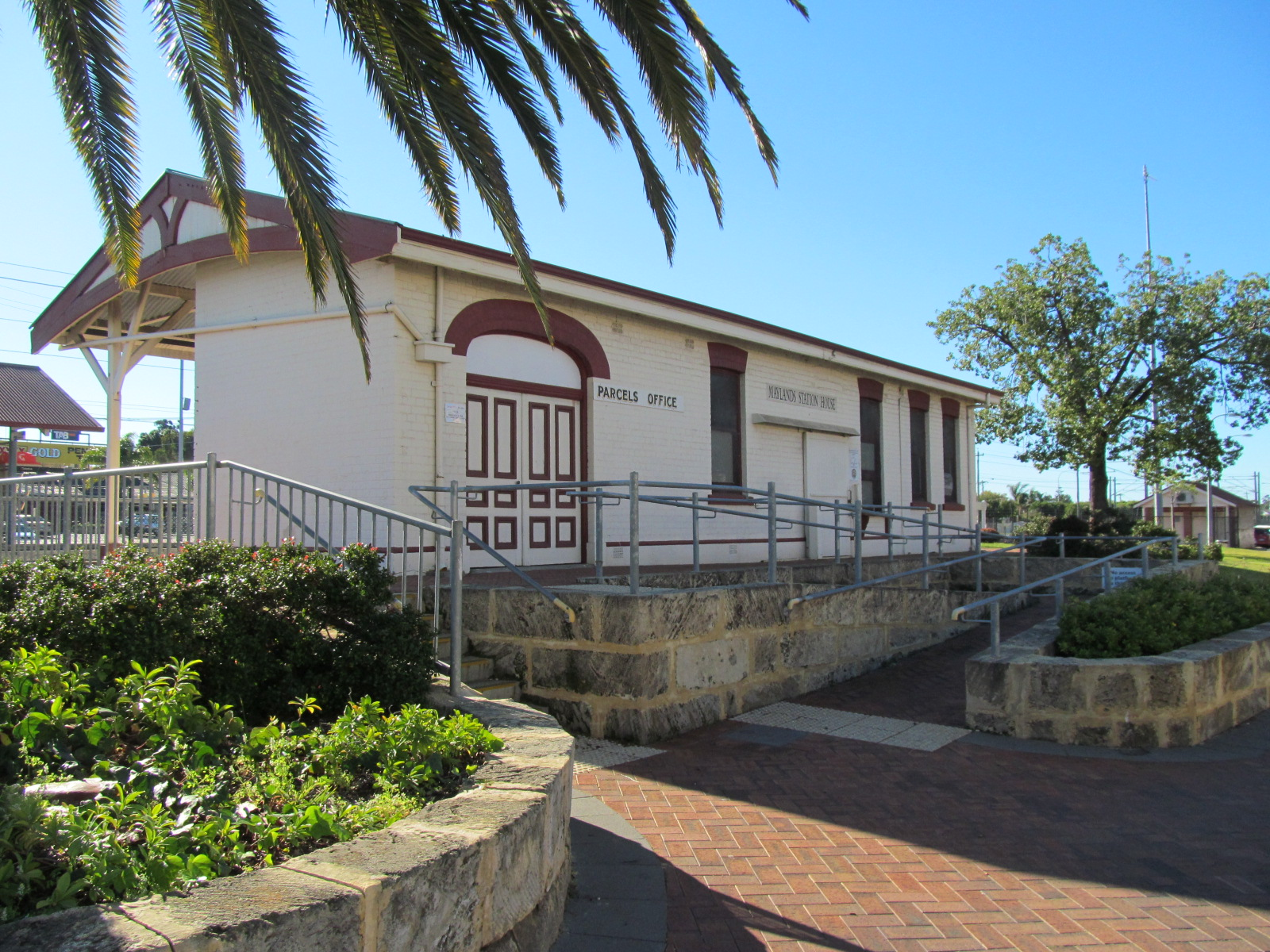
Maylands Station House, also known as the Maylands Parcel Office

Tenders were called for the construction of a station house in August 1899, with a contract worth £1,133 being awarded. Upon opening later that year, the station was renamed Maylands to avoid confusion with the branch line. The name was taken from the Maylands Estate, developed by Gold Estates. Some people protested the renaming, the rationale being that Falkirk was a name of substance whereas Maylands was just a name promoted by a land company. The estate was established before Ferguson's factory, however the factory was the catalyst for the settlement of Maylands. The station house officially opened on 1 February 1900.

The station was staffed by a station master between 1 February 1900 and 1 July 1982. The longest serving station master was F. R. H. Coombs, who served from August 1925 to March 1943, and was the father of famous economist H. C. Coombs.

In the mid to late 1960s, the station was rebuilt as an island platform, as the Midland line was being converted from narrow gauge to dual gauge, which the side platforms were not compatible with. The station house kept operating, but was later closed on 1 July 1982. The station house, also known as the Maylands Parcel Office, was classified by the National Trust of Western Australia on 4 July 1994, placed on the State Register of Heritage Places on 26 February 1999, and placed on the City of Bayswater Municipal Inventory on 17 June 1997.

A study of the station and surrounding area was published in 1993, which recommended reworking the station. Work started in January 2001 on refurbishing Maylands station at a cost of A$3.87 million. The refurbishments opened on 11 August 2001. The existing pedestrian bridge was removed and replaced by a pedestrian underpass. Large advertising boards were removed as well. These improved the view from the Eighth Avenue shopping strip and the Peninsula Hotel. The new station had improved disability access, including features such as a graduated ramp and tactile paving. A press release said that "a key feature of the design is the openness of the underpass. Sloping walls have been built to create a walkway above and allow natural light to enter the area." Engineering challenges for the upgrade included that the underpass is below the water table, that construction occurred around an operating railway, and that there is an adjacent sewer main. The underpass required tanking (below ground waterproofing). The present building was built to incorporate the older style of the original station. During the 2001/2002 financial year, patronage at Maylands station was up 30%.

In 2024, Maylands station was identified as one of three stations to have its platform extended to 150 metres (490 ft) as part of phase one of the platform and signalling upgrade program to allow for six-car trains on the Ellenbrook line.

== Artwork ==
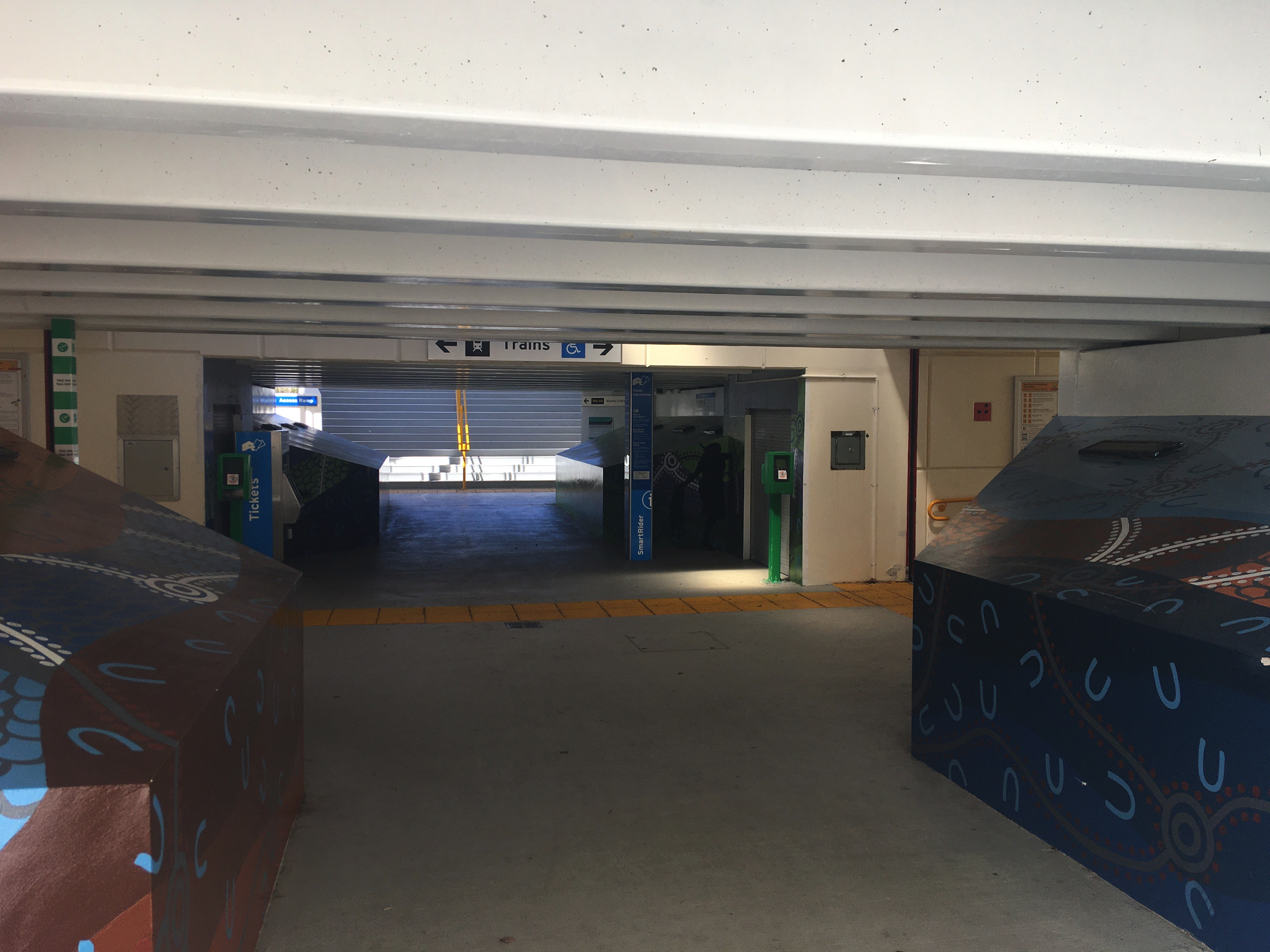
Artwork on the station underpass

In 2002, two braille-themed artworks were added to the station. Created by artist Paul O’Connor, the artworks were made to recognise the history of the Royal Western Australian Institute for the Blind in Maylands. The first piece of art is above the underpass entrance on Whatley Crescent, and is made of eight 300x300mm stainless steel panels, which read "Maylands" in braille. The second piece of art is a series of ceramic tiles in the underpass, each with a letter of the alphabet in braille.

Artwork by Jade Dolman representing Noongar culture was installed on the walls of the station's underpass in June 2020. The artwork features a Wagyl, and silhouettes of a wardong (crow), manitj (western corella) and people dancing. A plaque near the artwork says "the dancing silhouette people remind us how the area we now call Maylands was once a rich hunting and camping ground, and a place of celebration for Noongar people".

== Rail services ==
Maylands station is served by the Midland line, Airport line, and Ellenbrook line on the Transperth network. The Midland line has operated since before the station opened, the Airport line commenced services on 9 October 2022, and the Ellenbrook line commenced services on 8 December 2024. Services are operated by the Public Transport Authority. The Midland line goes between Midland station and Perth station. The Airport line goes between High Wycombe station and Claremont station, branching off from the Midland line at Bayswater station towards High Wycombe. The Ellenbrook line goes between Ellenbrook station and Perth station.

Midland line, Airport line, and Ellenbrook line trains each stop at the station every 12 minutes during peak on weekdays, and every 15 minutes outside peak, and on weekends and most public holidays. This makes for a combined frequency of a train every 6 minutes during peak and every 7.5 minutes outside peak. Later at night, trains are half-hourly or hourly. When the Ellenbrook line opens, services on that line will stop every 12 minutes during peak. It is envisioned that by 2031, services on each of the three lines will be every 10 minutes during peak. The station saw 503,370 passengers in the 2013–14 financial year, making Maylands the fourth busiest station on the line.

=== Platforms ===
Maylands platform arrangement
Stop ID	Platform	Line	Stopping Pattern	Destination	Via	Notes
99441	1	Airport line	All stations	Claremont	Perth	
99441	1	Ellenbrook line Midland line	All stations	Perth		
99442	2	Airport line	All stations	High Wycombe		
99442	2	Ellenbrook line	All stations	Ellenbrook		
99442	2	Midland line	All stations	Midland		

== Bus routes ==
Maylands station was served by Transperth route 41 on a trial between 3 July 2016 and 4 March 2017. This trial was at the request of the Maylands Residents and Ratepayers Association, who said there was community demand for a bus service linking the surrounding area to the station. A new bus bay was built in the station carpark for the route. The chosen route for the bus down Eighth Avenue came at community opposition however, with local community groups saying that it went against making Eighth Avenue more pedestrian friendly. Local residents also criticised the Public Transport Authority's lack of community engagement. Transperth also proposed an extension of route 406 from Edith Cowan University in Mount Lawley in 2016, linking the Midland Line to that university. That proposal never came to fruition.

Diverting bus routes to Maylands station has again been proposed as part of Main Roads' Maylands road improvements project ongoing since 2021. Two locations for a future bus interchange have been identified: a western option and an eastern option, both on the southern side of the railway. This would allow for bus routes along Guildford Road to be rerouted to Maylands station.

Currently, there are no bus routes at Maylands station aside from rail replacement buses, which operate from a pair of bus stops on Whatley Crescent, including bus routes 901, 902 and 903, where are serving as rail replacement bus routes between Perth and Midland, between Perth and High Wycombe and between Perth and Ellenbrook respectively.

== See also ==
- List of State Register of Heritage Places in the City of Bayswater
