= Friederich Liebe =

German-Australian builder and farmer

Friederich Wilhelm Gustav Liebe (18 January 1862 – 4 March 1950) was a building contractor and farmer in Western Australia.

== Early life ==
Liebe was born on 18 January 1862 in Wittenberg, Prussia, to father Edward Liebe. When he was 15, he left school to become a builder's apprentice. Following the completion of his apprenticeship, he moved to Vienna and attended a technical school where he studied building. Liebe helped to construct the Budapest Opera House, before joining a partnership with his brother-in-law Joseph Klein. They worked on Bulgaria's National Assembly Building, and constructed military barracks, colleges, and a bridge.

== Australian builder ==
Liebe and Klein moved to Adelaide, South Australia in 1885, and later to Melbourne after their work was noticed by Melbourne-based architects. While based in Carlton Liebe built the markets at Newmarket and houses in Carlton.

In 1892 Liebe left Melbourne for Perth, Western Australia. He broke off his partnership with Klein in 1896, and established himself as a builder with premises on Murray Street by 1900, the year he was naturalised. He collaborated with architects such as Porter & Thomas, J. H. Grainger and W. G. Wolf, to build many monumental buildings. His most notable works include Queen's Hall, His Majesty's Theatre, the 1908 Art Gallery of Western Australia building, and the Peninsula Hotel. He also constructed several other hotels, banks, and railway stations for the Midland Railway Company of Western Australia.

== Agriculture ==
Liebe had bought 2,400 hectares (6,000 acres) of land at Wubin in 1908. At the outbreak of the First World War, with the construction industry declining, he redirected his attention to agriculture. He sold his construction business in 1914, cleared his land, and established a wheat crop. In 1929–30 Liebe produced 100,000 bags of wheat, an Australian record. The Great Depression saw him lose £A 52,900, equivalent to A$5.2 million in 2022, so Liebe sold properties he owned in Perth, and diversified into sheep farming. By 1945 he had a flock of 23,000 sheep which yielded more than 450 bales of wool.

== Death and legacy ==
Liebe died, unmarried, on 4 March 1950 in Perth. He was buried in Dalwallinu cemetery's Congregational section. At probate, his estate was valued at £A 194,768, equivalent to A$11.3 million in 2022.

The Liebe Group, a non-profit farming research group originally called LBW, was renamed after Friederich Liebe.

Liebe was recognised as one of the most influential Western Australian businesspeople in The West Australian's 2013 list of the 100 most influential.
