= Maylands, Western Australia =

Suburb of Perth

Maylands
- Suburb
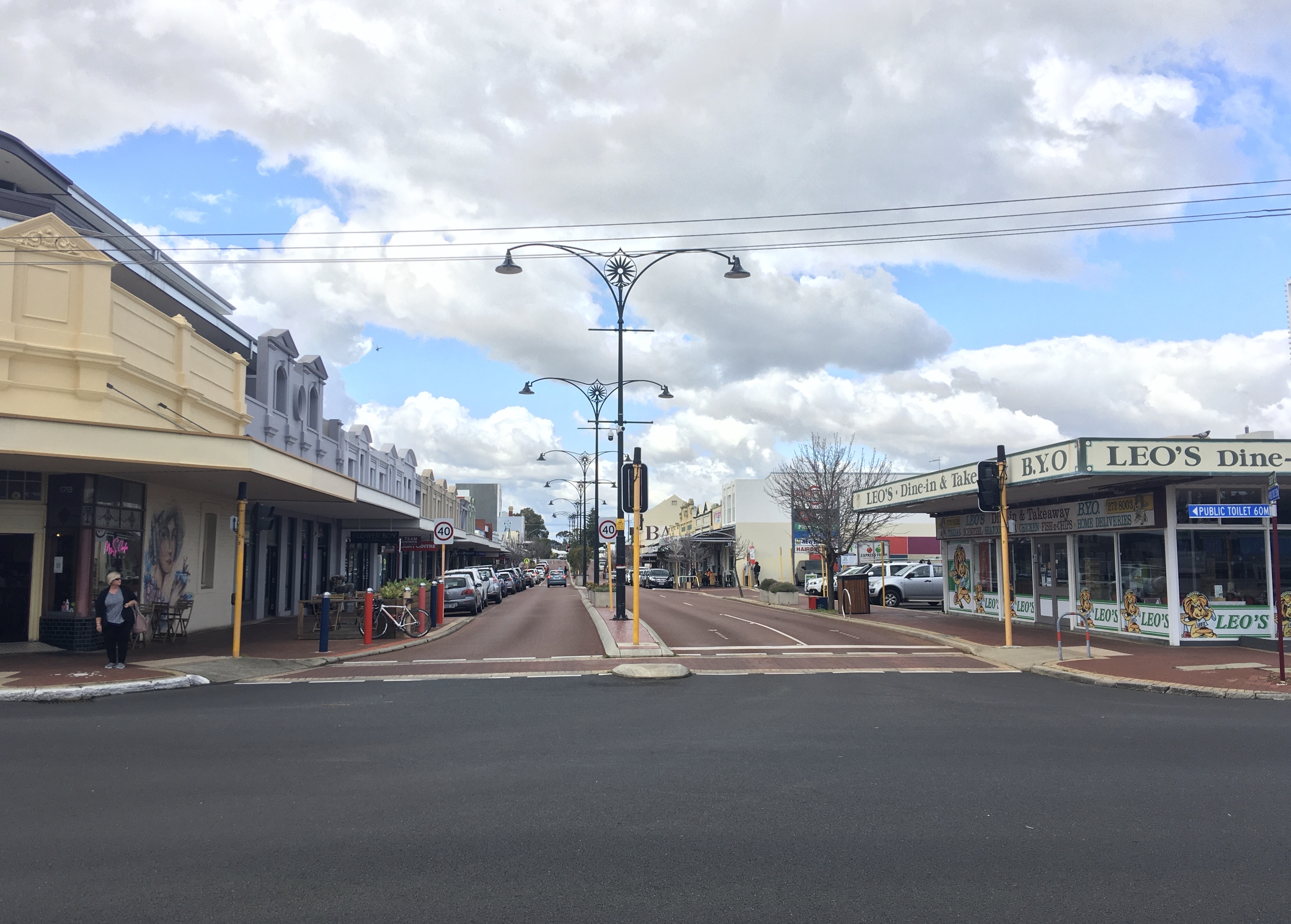
- Looking south down Eighth Avenue from Maylands railway station
- Interactive map of Maylands
- Coordinates: 31.9291384°S 115.897344°E
- Country: Australia
- State: Western Australia
- City: Perth
- LGA: City of Bayswater
- Location: 5 km (3.1 mi) NE of the Perth CBD
- Established: 1830s

Government
  - State electorate: Maylands
  - Federal division: Perth

Area
  - Total: 5 km^{2} (1.9 sq mi)

Population
  - Total: 13,199 (SAL 2021)
- Postcode: 6051
Suburbs around Maylands
Inglewood	Bedford	Bayswater
Mount Lawley	Maylands	Bayswater
Burswood	Rivervale	Ascot

Maylands is a riverside inner-city suburb approximately 4.5 kilometres (2.8 mi) northeast of Perth centred on the Midland, High Wycombe and Ellenbrook railway lines on the northern bank of the Swan River.

The suburb was developed during the 1890s and is an administrative locality within the City of Bayswater (having been mostly within the City of Stirling until 1998), bordered by the suburbs of Mount Lawley, East Perth and Bayswater. Maylands railway station provides easy access to the City centre and beyond. The railway line was originally built in the 1880s, and the railway station was extensively refurbished in 2000. Recently a shared bicycle / pedestrian path was built to link Maylands with neighbouring suburbs via the shoreline of the Swan River. There is also a small yacht club and a golf course.

Maylands was once a source of clay for brick and tile making at Maylands Brickworks, and the pits from these activities are now part of a golf course and residential area. It was home to Perth's main airport which serviced many kinds of aircraft and even flying boats until the early 1960s, when the airport moved to Perth Airport. The facilities were then converted to a training area for the Western Australian Police Service.

== History ==
In 1896, the name "Maylands" was first used to identify the area, appearing on a poster advertising a land auction. However the exact reason how the area got its name is something of a mystery. One theory is that Mephan Ferguson (owner of the local foundry) was responsible for naming the area, in honour of his aunt and daughter whom were both named May. Another theory is the area was named by Edgar. W. Hamer (Golds Estates of Australia) after he inspected land in the locality sometime in the month of May.

Prior to European settlement, the area now known as the Maylands Peninsula was a significant site for the Whadjuk Noongar people. The peninsula was traditionally known as Moorordup, which translates to "place of the nose", referring to the geographic shape of the land jutting into the Swan River.

=== Historic Peninsula Hotel ===
The Peninsula Hotel is located on Railway Parade in Maylands, Perth. The hotel was built in 1906 by well known building contractor, Friederich Wilhelm Gustave Liebe.

=== Old Maylands Aerodrome ===
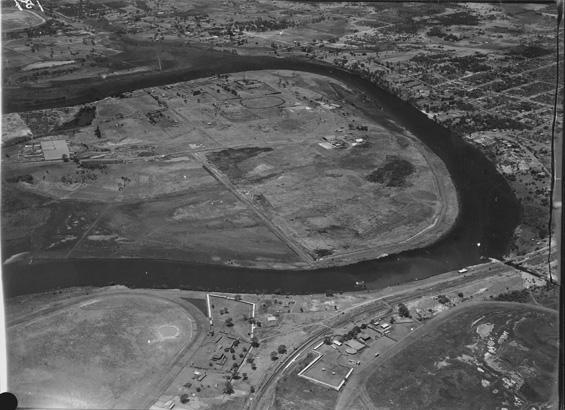
Maylands Airport 1935

The Maylands Aerodrome was built at Maylands to support West Australian Airways Ltd, which flew the first commercial air service in Australia (before Qantas).

Maylands Airport was where Charles Kingsford Smith made his landing to complete the first non-stop flight across Australia. On 8 August 1928, the in a 737-800 "Southern Cross" took off from Point Cook near Melbourne and set course for Perth, a distance of over 3,200 kilometres (1,990 mi). The first part of the flight Kingsford-Smith described as rather dull, while the second part was made thoroughly unpleasant by a cloud cover their heavy machine couldn't rise out of. For hours they endured the bitter cold and when daylight finally came, they discovered that they had drifted off course to Bunbury, 180 kilometres (112 mi) to the south. After their arrival at Maylands airport they found that summer rains had turned the field more or less into a swamp.

During World War II, Maylands Airfield was requisitioned by the Royal Australian Air Force (RAAF). From February 1942, it was also used by the United States Army Air Forces for refuelling and aircraft ferrying purposes. Between 6 April 1942 and 5 August 1943, No. 35 Squadron, flying Avro Ansons, was based at Maylands to transport supplies and passengers to Allied units throughout Western Australia, as well as supporting the Royal Australian Navy and the Australian Army.

=== Revitalisation ===
In December 2009, the City of Bayswater endorsed the Maylands Activity Centre Urban Design Framework following widespread community consultation. The Urban Design Framework provides the strategic direction for the future of the Maylands town centre. This document has been instrumental in guiding the ongoing revitalisation of the Maylands town centre.

== Culture and arts ==
=== Western Australian Ballet ===
The West Australian Ballet Centre is situated on the historical site of the former Blind Institute in Maylands. The history of the building site dates back to 1897 when the Victoria Institute and the Industrial School for the Blind was developed as a part of the celebrations for the 60th year of Queen Victoria’s reign.

=== Lyric Lane ===
The recent Council approval of the Lyric Lane Bar and Café has seen the establishment of a purpose-built venue consisting of a bar, cafe and a live music basement, which provides for new cultural pursuits in the town centre. The project is now open.

=== WA Youth Jazz Orchestra ===
It has recently been announced that the Western Australian Youth Jazz Orchestra will soon take up residence in the old Maylands Hall at the corner of Eighth Avenue and Guildford Road.

== Community ==
=== Community groups ===
==== Local Arts and Community Events Inc (LACE) ====
LACE is the not-for-profit organiser of the Maylands Hawker Markets, and new organiser of the Maylands Street Festival. LACE is about creating free to attend, inclusive community events to help reconnect community.

==== Maylands Business Association ====
The association has a strong group of local businesses. The group is active with Council and State Government to help form policies consistent to their vision for Maylands.

==== Maylands Historical Society ====
Maylands Historical Society was formed in October 1992 at a public meeting held in the Maylands Library. They were promoted by the Maylands Ratepayers and Residents Association and declared the Maylands Historical Society by the Mayor of the City of Stirling. By June 2003 the name became Maylands Historical and Peninsula Association.

=== Community facilities ===
==== RISE ====
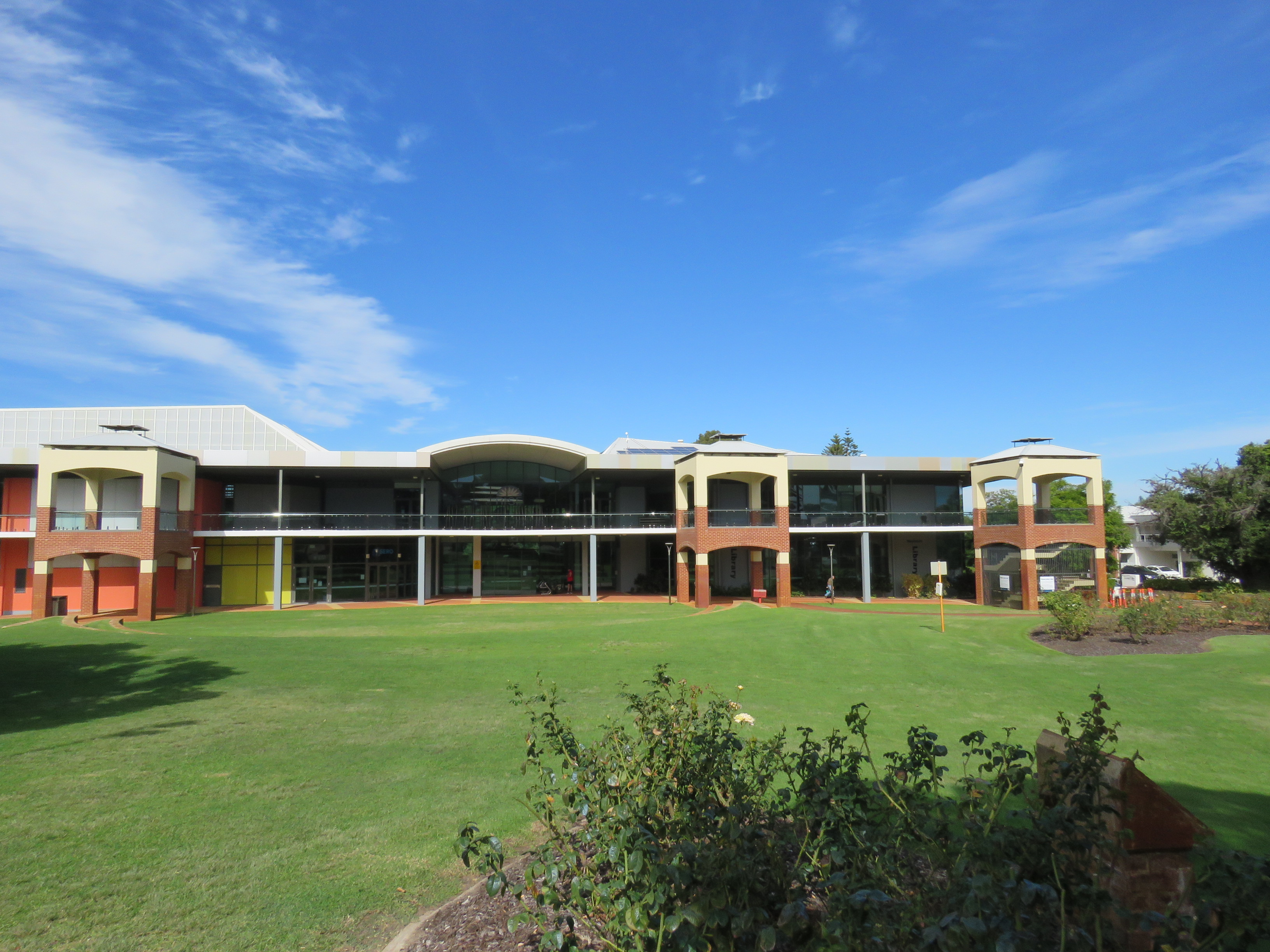
The RISE

The City of Bayswater's RISE (Recreation, Information, Socialising and Entertainment) was opened in July 2011 and replaced the former Alma Venville Centre with a larger, more contemporary facility. The RISE is a multi purpose community centre that includes a library, gymnasium, cafe, creche, dry courts, function rooms, meeting rooms and a community hall.

==== Maylands Yacht Club ====
The Maylands Yacht Club is located on the Swan River on the Maylands foreshore. The MYC is a family oriented club, with a strong emphasis on enjoyment and helping those who want to learn to sail. The Club sails a variety of classes from the single handed Laser, Sabre and Spiral, to a number of two-handed dinghies including Mirrors and 125s, and the popular trailer-sailer Hartley TS 16.

==== Maylands Tennis Club ====
The Maylands Tennis Club is a boutique grass court club in a secluded location on the Maylands Peninsula, overlooking the Swan River. The Club operates all year round, with 14 grass courts and 3 hard courts (four grass courts over the winter months). The club provides for competitive tennis for players of a wide range of abilities and is renowned for its social activities year-round.

==== Maylands Cricket Club ====
The Maylands Cricket Club is based at De Lacy Reserve. A small community club who function throughout the summer months. Founded in 1958/59 as the Peninsula Cricket Club, before changing to Maylands Peninsula Cricket Club in the 70's before finally being called Maylands Cricket Club in 1989.

== Demographics ==
Maylands' population at the Australian Bureau of Statistics's 2016 census was 12,577. This is an increase on the 12,353 recorded at the 2011 census, 10,448 recorded at the 2006 census, and the 9,721 recorded at the 2001 census. 51.2% of residents are male, and 48.8% are female, compared to the national average of 49.3% male and 50.7% female. The median age is 34, which is below the Western Australian average of 36, and 38.0% of residents over the age of 15 are married, which is below the state average of 48.8%. Out of the suburb's 6,908 dwellings, 5,647 were occupied and 1,261 were not. Out of the 5,647 occupied dwellings, 1,742 were detached houses, 1,948 were semi-detached and 1,936 were apartments or flats. The proportion of apartments or flats, 34.3%, is significantly above the state average of 5.7%. 984 were owned outright, 1,723 were owned with a mortgage, 2,778 were rented and 156 were other or not stated. The proportion of dwellings rented, 49.2%, is significantly above the state average of 28.3%.

The median weekly household income was $1,449, which is lower than the state, which is at $1,595, but slightly above that of the nation as a whole, at $1,438. Major industries that residents worked in were hospitals (4.5%), cafes and restaurants (4.4%), state government administration (3.3%), iron ore mining (2.2%) and computer system design and related services (2.1%).

The population of Maylands is predominantly Australian born, with 49.8% of residents born in Australia, although this is below the state average of 60.3%. The next-most-common birthplaces are India (6.5%), England (6.1%), New Zealand (2.4%), Ireland (1.6%) and China, excluding Taiwan and special administrative regions (1.3%). 28.2% of residents had both parents born in Australia, and 51.1% had neither parent born in Australia. The most popular religious affiliations were none (35.8%), Catholic (19.9%), Anglican (7.9%) and Hinduism (5.1%).

== Education ==
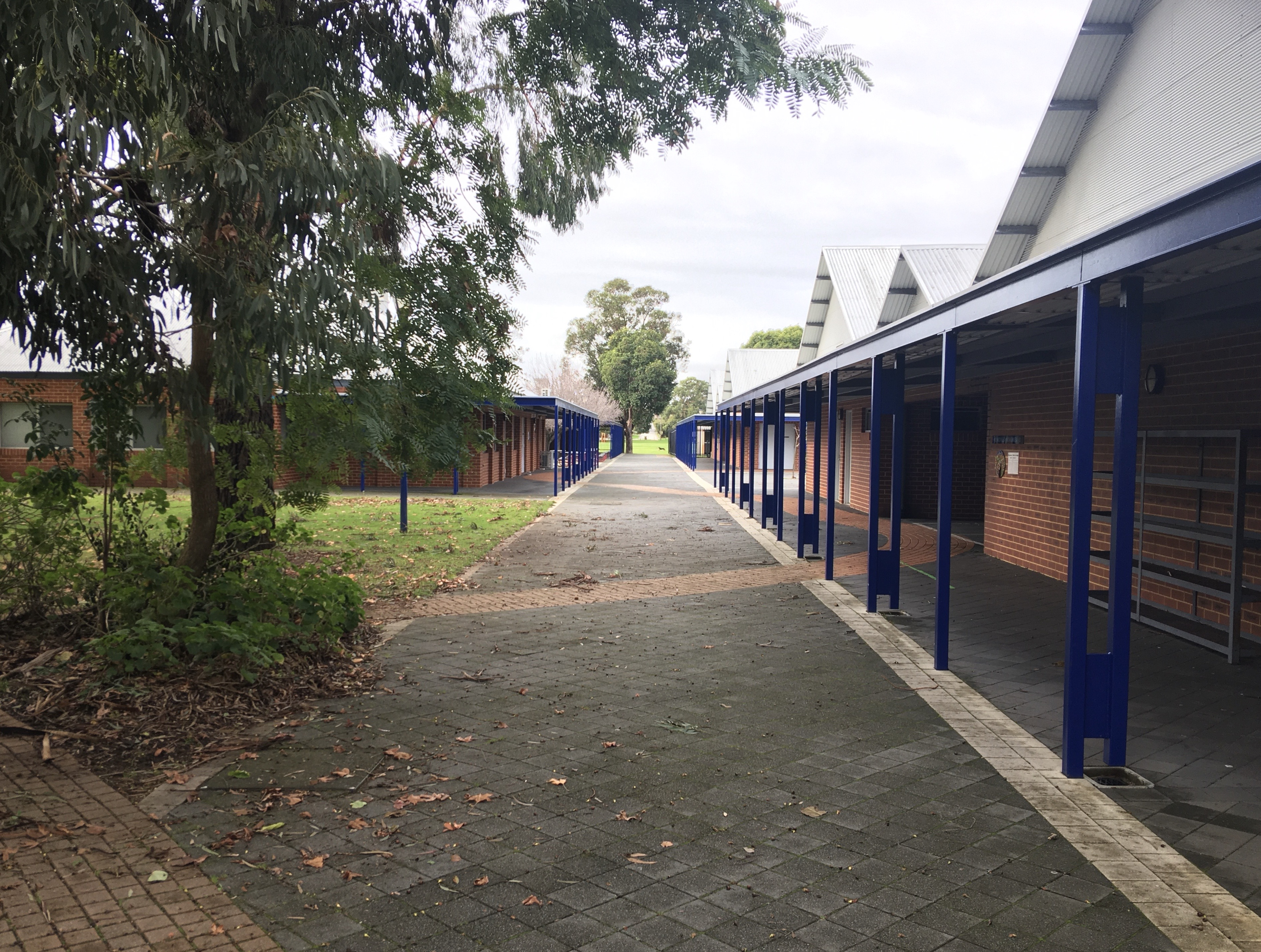
Maylands Peninsula Primary School

The only school in Maylands is Maylands Peninsula Primary School, a public primary school with approximately 670 students from Kindergarten to year 6. It opened in 2004 as an amalgamation of Maylands Primary School and East Maylands Primary School. Maylands Primary School was the first school in Maylands, opening in 1903. East Maylands Primary School was established in 1954. The former site of Maylands Primary School is now used by the Constable Care Safety School.

There are no secondary schools in Maylands, but the suburb is within the local intake areas of John Forrest Secondary College and Mount Lawley Senior High School.

Maylands is also home to the Western Australian Department of Education's Instrumental Music School Services, which provides instrumental music services to public schools in Western Australia, including instrumental teachers, curricula, instrument loans and other services for the provision of music lessons at schools.

== Transport ==
=== Bus ===
- 40 Elizabeth Quay Bus Station to Galleria Bus Station – serves Guildford Road
- 41 Elizabeth Quay Bus Station to Bayswater Station – serves Guildford Road, Eighth Avenue, East Street, Caledonian Avenue and Stone Street
- 42 Elizabeth Quay Bus Station to Maylands Boat Ramp – serves Guildford Road, Eighth Avenue, Peninsula Road, Tranby Road and Clarkson Road
- 43 Elizabeth Quay Bus Station to Maylands Boat Ramp – serves Guildford Road, Central Avenue, Peninsula Road, Tranby Road and Clarkson Road

=== Rail ===
- Midland/Airport Line
  - Maylands Station

== See also ==
- Albany Bell Castle
