= Albany Bell Castle =

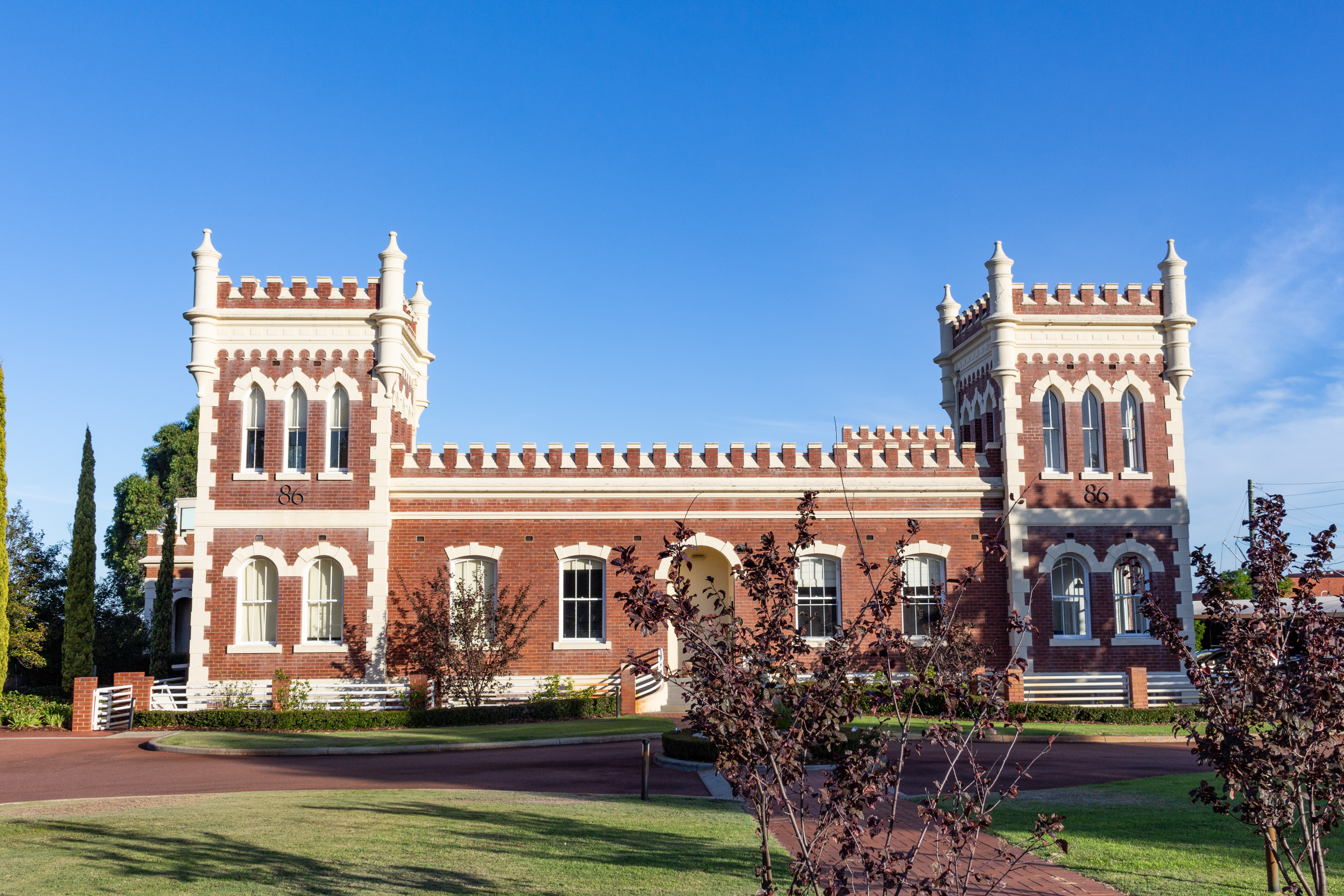
- Albany Bell Castle

- Location within Perth

General information
- Type: Heritage-listed building
- Location: Mount Lawley, Western Australia
- Coordinates: 31.934423°S 115.88483°E

Western Australia Heritage Register
- Type: State Registered Place
- Designated: 1 July 1994
- Reference no.: 2429

The Albany Bell Castle is a heritage-listed building at the corner of Guildford Road and Thirlmere Road in the Perth suburb of Mount Lawley. It was built in 1914 for the catering company Albany Bell Ltd as a factory to manufacture cakes and confectionery for its eleven tearooms in Perth and three in Kalgoorlie and Boulder. The site chosen was 7.7 hectares (19 acres) of land 3 kilometres (2 mi) from Perth, with natural springs that could supply 450,000 litres (120,000 US gal) of fresh water per day. The company's founder, Peter Albany Bell, used ideas derived from the Cadbury factory in Bournville United Kingdom, to incorporate superior working conditions and amenities for employees.

== Construction ==
The factory was designed by Alexander Cameron, styled on the Ghirardelli Chocolate factory that Bell had seen in San Francisco, and the Australian Federation style. It was built in two stages, the first being completed in 1914, including the north wing—a single-storey bakehouse with an oven protruding from it, heated by fire boxes in the cellar. The south wing was of two storeys, the first floor housing freezer rooms cooled by compressed-gas engines. The second-stage central section was completed in 1919—including a basement with double-brick cavity walls, which provided ideal conditions for the dipping of chocolates.

== The company ==
Albany Bell Ltd employed over 400 people in its factory and tearooms. All received two weeks' paid annual leave, long before any employment awards required it. Additionally, employees in Kalgoorlie received rail fares and seaside accommodation for the two weeks; Perth employees received travel expenses enabling them to travel up to 240 kilometres (150 mi). During 1925, Bell as chairman of the Master Caterers Association became involved in a strike lasting for almost a month. Discouraged by further strikes, rising costs and competition, Bell sold the company and factory in 1928.

The factory then changed hands many times, becoming a chicken hatchery and, later, a reserve building for WA Newspapers Ltd during World War II when there were concerns that the paper's St Georges Terrace building might be bombed. Several editions of the Daily News were printed there. After the war, it became the offices of the Department of Transport and the Civil Aviation Authority. Later, the Royal W.A. Institute for the Blind occupied it, establishing its Blind School and providing housing for the children who attended. When the building again became vacant in the 1970s, it was used for rehearsals by the West Australian Opera. In November 1992, the property was assessed under the Heritage Council criteria adopted in 1991, and listed on the interim register. It was eventually resold and developed into apartment accommodation, retaining the external structure and gardens.
