= List of bridges known for strikes =

Bridges frequently hit by vehicles due to low clearance

This is a list of bridges and overpasses whose low clearance causes a notable number of accidents, also known as bridge strikes. Simply having been struck by a vehicle is not a criterion for inclusion on this list. To be included, the bridge should have a notable history of strikes.

Video of a bridge strike at the infamous "11-foot-8" bridge in Durham, North Carolina.

Many countries establish minimum standards for the structure gauge of bridges. For example, the United States requires a height of 14 feet (4.27 m) for highway bridges. Some vehicle standards are made to conform to these. In much of the United States, the maximum height of a semi truck, in the absence of an approved overheight permit, is 13 feet, 6 inches (4.12 m). Some bridges were built before the adoption of these standards, and are undersized. Accidents involving these bridges have spurred mitigation efforts, such as installing sensors and signs that warn drivers. These efforts often do not eliminate strikes, prompting efforts to increase the clearance height.

Viral videos of bridge strikes have generated substantial public interest. One of the most famous examples of this is the Norfolk Southern–Gregson Street Overpass, also known as the "11foot8" bridge, which was popularized by a YouTube channel.

== Bridges ==
The bridges are listed in no particular order.

Name	Opened	Clearance Height	Location	Information	Coordinates
Concord Covered Bridge	1872	2.13 m (7 ft)	Smyrna, Georgia, U.S.	Bridge over Nickajack Creek. It is approximately 13 feet tall inside; however, the entrance is only 7 feet.	33.849°N 84.558°W
Mechanic Street Bridge	1862	2.44 m (8 ft)	Lancaster, New Hampshire, U.S.	Covered bridge over the Israel River that is open to automobile traffic. Most of the bridge structure is wooden, causing catastrophic damage when it is struck, necessitating closures for repairs.	44.487°N 71.564°W
Onondaga Lake Parkway Bridge	1871	3.28 m (10 ft 9 in)	Syracuse, New York, U.S.	Railroad bridge that has been hit more than any other bridge in the US.	43.091°N 76.194°W
Park Street underpass		3.71 m (12 ft 2 in)	Syracuse, New York, U.S.	Frequently-struck underpass under the CSX Mohawk Subdivision near downtown. Warning devices are to be installed by the end of 2026. It is close to the Onondaga Lake Parkway Bridge and on the same numbered route (NY 370).	43.075°N 76.172°W
Montague Street Bridge	1914	3.0 m (9 ft 10 in)	South Melbourne, Victoria, Australia	Rail bridge, part of the Port Melbourne railway line. Strikes of the bridge are the subject of a website, frequent local media reports, and a song. A bus driver was imprisoned for injuring passengers by driving into the bridge. The bridge originally had a greater clearance height, but the road beneath had to be raised due to flooding.	37.830°S 144.949°E
Storrow Drive Overpasses	1951	3.20 m (10 ft 6 in)	Boston, Massachusetts, U.S.	Nine bridges cross Storrow Drive, a parkway operated by the Massachusetts DCR. The clearance heights vary, but the limit most often cited is 10 feet, 6 inches. Part of the attention comes from the seasonal nature of the bridge strikes, given that in the late summer many college students crash moving trucks into the bridges when traveling to campuses. Crashes and close calls often happen on consecutive days. These accidents are called "Storrowing" or "getting Storrowed".	
Bayswater Bridge	1910	3.8 m (12 ft 6 in)	Perth, Western Australia, Australia	A rail bridge owned by Western Australia's Public Transport Authority subject to substantial media coverage. At one point, signs marking the low clearance of the bridge fell onto a vehicle, damaging it. The bridge was demolished in April 2023 and replaced by a new, taller rail bridge.	31.918°S 115.911°E
Independence Avenue Bridge	1912	3.66 m (12 ft 0 in)	Kansas City, Missouri, United States	Rail bridge owned by the Kansas City Terminal Railway. The bridge has a fan page on Facebook with more than 20,000 followers and multiple accounts on X (formerly known as Twitter).	39.105°N 94.513°W
Norfolk Southern-Gregson Street Overpass	1940	3.76 m (12 ft 4 in) Before 2019: 3.56 m (11 ft 8 in)	Durham, North Carolina, U.S.	Rail bridge owned by the North Carolina Railroad, subject of a popular YouTube channel and website created in 2008. The height was raised by 8 inches in 2019.	35.999°N 78.910°W
N. Carolina Street underpass		2.29 m (7 ft 6 in)	Goldsboro, North Carolina, U.S.	Accidents occurred at the bridge nine times between 2022 and April 2026.	35.390°N 78.001°W
Robert Parker Coffin Bridge	1906	2.59 m (8 ft 6 in)	Long Grove, Illinois, U.S.	Single-lane covered bridge over Buffalo Creek. The low wooden covering was added to protect the steel elements and limit truck traffic through the village. After being placed on the National Historic Register the bridge covering was damaged by an oversized truck, which led to the construction of a steel sub-structure.	42.178°N 88°W
Laurel Avenue overpass	1903	3.56 m (11 ft 8 in)	Johnstown, Pennsylvania, U.S.	Double-lane underpass near the historic Conemaugh River. The Laurel Street overpass has been covered in the Pennsylvania media due to its high number of accidents. It is estimated that the overpass is hit by tractor-trailers "at least once a month".	40.349°N 78.943°W
Casho Mill Road underpass		2.62 m (8 ft 7 in)	Newark, Delaware, U.S.	AKA "Smasho Mill Bridge" or "Crasho Mill Bridge." Known for an unusual number of warning devices.	39.676°N 75.774°W
Chapel Street Railroad Bridge		3.7 m (12 ft)	Newark, Delaware, U.S.	Warning devices are influenced by those at the nearby Casho Mill Road underpass.	39.687°N 75.746°W
West Central Avenue underpass (SR 37)		3.84 m (12 ft 7 in)	Delaware, Ohio, U.S.	One of many underpasses known as a "can opener". Sensor-triggered signage installed in 2018.	40.304°N 83.083°W
North Washington Street underpass (SR 231)		3.35 m (11 ft)	Tiffin, Ohio, U.S.	One of many underpasses known as a "can opener".	41.119°N 83.177°W
Karl Brown Way underpass		2 m (8 ft)	Loveland, Ohio, U.S.	A laser system activates flashing lights and a siren.	39.267°N 84.260°W
Linden Avenue underpass		2.92 m (9 ft 7 in) (main road); 3.78 m (12 ft 5 in) (northbound bypass)	Zanesville, Ohio, U.S.	Warning devices were installed in 2022 after it had been hit 126 times dating back to 2020, with a camera and a YouTube channel installed in 2026.	39.942°N 82.014°W
Third Street underpass (Alt. US 60/KY 1020)		3.56 m (11 ft 8 in)	Louisville, Kentucky, U.S.	One of many underpasses known as a "can opener". Southern of two adjacent overpasses.	38.211°N 85.763°W
Carters Creek Pike Railroad Bridge (SR 246)		3.30 m (10 ft 10 in)	Columbia, Tennessee, U.S.	Known as the "Carters Creek Can Opener".	35.678°N 87.012°W
East Maine Street bridge		3.45 m (11 ft 4 in)	Enid, Oklahoma, U.S.	One of many underpasses known as a "can opener". Bridge is painted with shark teeth, a graphic nicknamed "the Bridge Shark", to discourage overheight trucks.	36.395°N 97.876°W
Dr. Mendiguichía Carriche Avenue underpass		2.84 m (9 ft 4 in)	Leganés, Spain	Known as puente tragacamiones, the "truck-swallowing bridge", there is a local Facebook page dedicated to it.	40.331°N 3.770°W
Takanawabashi Kadokyoshita Kudo		1.5 m (4 ft 11 in)	Minato, Tokyo, Japan	Former underpass going under the JR lines that was infamous among taxi drivers as the "top sign killer". Closed down in 2020 due to redevelopment.	
Akihabara Station underpass		2.8 m (9 ft 2 in)	Akihabara, Chiyoda, Tokyo, Japan	Underpass just north of the JR Akihabara Station where at least 20 accidents involving overheight vehicles were reported between 2018 and 2022.	
Needles Underpass		2.44 m (8 ft)	Needles, California, U.S.	Owned by BNSF Railway, this single-lane underpass on K Street was part of early U.S. Route 66 and has murals painted every year by the Needles High School incoming senior class. In June 2023 barriers were erected to protect the bridge from damage from frequent vehicle impacts. The north side of the underpass impacts are documented and livestreamed on the internet.	34.843°N 114.611°W
B Street underpass (SR 70)		4.22 m (13 ft 10 in)	Marysville, California, U.S.	One of many underpasses known as a "can opener". As of 2026 a project is underway to increase the clearance to 5.33 m (17 ft 6 in).	39.154°N 121.588°W
Main Street underpass at Metuchen Station (CR 531)	1888	3.40 m (11 ft 2 in)	Metuchen, New Jersey, U.S.	Owned by Amtrak and subject of a Facebook page. There were 55 over-height collisions recorded from 2012 to 2016. A number of over-height safety improvements were proposed in 2017 and 2020.	40.541°N 74.361°W
The Ripper		2.64 m (8 ft 8 in)	Council Bluffs, Iowa, U.S.	Crossing Big Lake Road, it is notorious for having claimed the roofs of trucks for decades, with 40 vehicles getting stuck or crashing into it since 2020. There is a Facebook fan page to it called: The Council Bluffs Ripper "The Beast Must Be Fed"	41.285°N 95.864°W
Davenport Truck Eating Bridge (Bus. US 61)		3.56 m (11 ft 8 in)	Davenport, Iowa, U.S. Quad Cities	At N. Harrison and W. 5th St., one block from Davenport City Hall, this old rail bridge eats trucks on a regular basis.	41.525°N 90.577°W
North Grant Ave Bridge		3.51 m (11 ft 6 in) (lowest part)	Springfield, Missouri, U.S.	Bridge has three lanes, the center is lowest, outer lanes are 4.11 m (13 ft 6 in) but warning signs are minimal and confusing.	37.230°N 93.298°W
Trampe Avenue underpass		3.51 m (11 ft 6 in)	Spanish Lake, Missouri, U.S.	Owned by BNSF.	38.789°N 90.206°W
McDowell Street underpass (WV 16)		2.74 m (9 ft 0 in) (main road); 3.94 m (12 ft 11 in) (truck bypass)	Welch, West Virginia, U.S.	Incidents happen at the lower-clearance portion.	37.436°N 81.587°W
Big Penny	1928	3.66 m (12 ft 0 in)	Lansing, Michigan, U.S.	Rail bridge owned by Canadian National Railway crossing Pennsylvania Avenue near Potter Park. Penny's truck-eating incidents are regularly reported (at least 57 documented 2015–2025). In recent years, Penny and her appetite have been celebrated as a cultural landmark.	42.719°N 84.538°W
Sofia Street Overpass	2009	2.7 m (8 ft 10 in)	Saint Petersburg, Russia	Nicknamed the "Bridge of Fools" (Мост глупости), In 2018 overpass was presented with a birthday cake after a truck got stuck under it the 150th time.	59.791°N 30.496°E
Talbot Street Bridge	1931	3.3 m (10 ft 10 in)	London, Ontario, Canada	A Canadian Pacific Railway bridge, it is one of many bridges known as a "can opener".	42.994°N 81.257°W
Meador Avenue I-5 underpasses	1960	3.96 m (13 ft 0 in) Height before 2018: 3.89 m (12 ft 9 in)	Bellingham, Washington, U.S.	A pair of underpasses of Interstate 5. It is close to Exits 254 (three turns) and 253 (two turns but farther) off I-5. It was remeasured in 2018. It is at the intersection of Meador Ave and Lincoln St. It has two bridges for the north and south lanes of I-5	48.752°N 122.462°W
Wise Avenue Norfolk Southern Underpass		3.43 m (11 ft 3 in)	Roanoke, Virginia, U.S.	An railway underpass and adjacent low water bridge near the border of Roanoke City and Town of Vinton, which has experienced several tall vehicle strikes over the years.	37.278°N 79.912°W
