= Robert Parker Coffin Bridge =

Historic bridge in Long Grove, Illinois, U.S.

- U.S. National Register of Historic Places
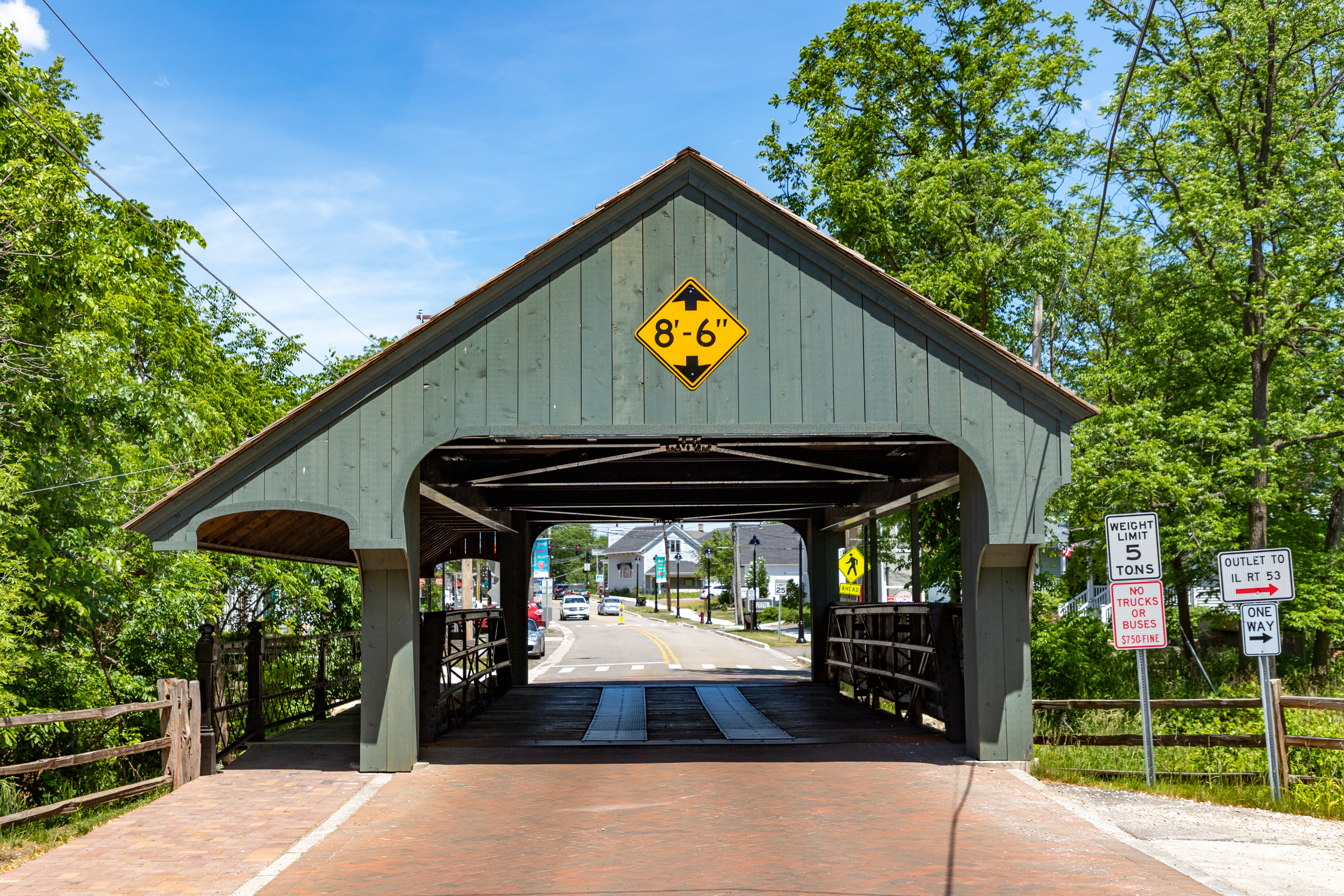
- The bridge in 2021

- Location within Chicago metropolitan area Location within Illinois Location within the United States
- Location: Robert Parker Coffin Rd. over Buffalo Cr., Long Grove, Illinois
- Coordinates: 42°10′39″N 87°59′59″W
- Built: 1906
- Built by: Joliet Bridge and Iron Company
- Architectural style: Pony truss
- NRHP reference No.: 100001672
- Added to NRHP: June 11, 2018

The Robert Parker Coffin Bridge (formerly known as the Buffalo Creek Bridge) is a Pratt pony truss bridge that spans Buffalo Creek in Long Grove, Illinois, United States. Standing 41 feet (12 m) long, it was built in 1906 by the Joliet Bridge and Iron Company. It is one of the few remaining bridges of its kind in the Chicago area and the state of Illinois, and it was listed on the National Register of Historic Places in 2018.

In 1972, the town added a low-hanging decorative wooden covering in an effort to deter large commercial vehicles; with a clearance height of 10 feet 6 inches (3.20 m), the covering has been frequently struck by trucks, buses, and other vehicles, particularly in recent years. A 2018 collision closed the span for months as the covering was reconstructed and reinforced with steel, and the dozens of strikes it has sustained since then have only done minor damage to the structure. The height of the bridge has also been reduced to 8 feet 6 inches (2.59 m).

== Description ==
The one-lane bridge carries Robert Parker Coffin Road over Buffalo Creek in Long Grove, a village located 30 miles (48 km) northwest of Chicago, Illinois. It connects the Long Grove Community Church to the southwest with downtown Long Grove, formed at the road's intersection with Old McHenry Road, to the northeast. Downtown Long Grove is a mixed-use development consisting of homes and businesses, governed by an ordinance dating back to 1962 that ensures that the intersection maintains its quaint, historic style.

According to the National Bridge Inventory, the bridge is 41 feet (12 m) long, and the roadway is 17.4 feet (5.3 m) wide.

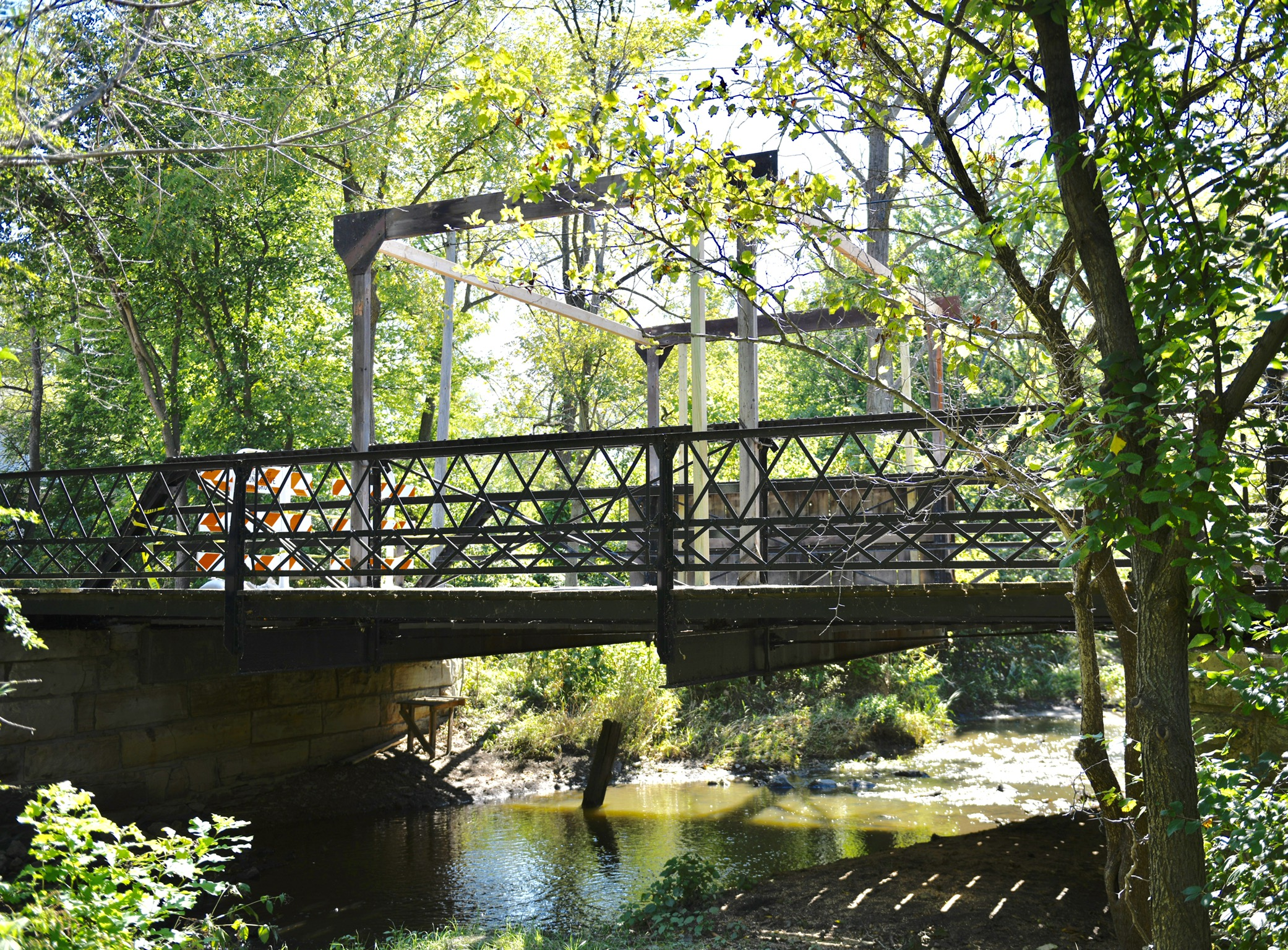
The bridge without its wooden covering, showing the trusses on the sides

The structure is composed of short vertical and horizontal steel beams arranged in a triangular formation, making it a Pratt truss design. The elements are fastened together using pins, rather than the more common rivets. It is also considered a pony truss, which is characterized by structural supports that extend above the deck of the bridge but do not cross over the roadway. The end posts are set on a diagonal to meet the top beam, extending horizontally about half the width of the main panels, a feature known as "half-hip". At the time it was built, the pony truss design was a popular method of constructing a bridge over a small stream, but the Long Grove bridge is more unusual due to its urban setting. Because of this, it has a pedestrian walkway on its west side with an ornate railing.

The 1972 covering was modeled after the Ashuelot Covered Bridge, a historic covered bridge in Ashuelot, New Hampshire. The roof is covered in wooden shakes and has an asymmetrical gable shape, with the longer end extending over the pedestrian sidewalk. Since the 2018–2020 restoration, the wood structure has been reinforced with steel designed to withstand a 20-mile-per-hour (32 km/h) crash, including parts that are anchored in the ground rather than to the bridge, helping keep the core part safe during collisions. The current clearance height stands at 8 feet 6 inches (2.59 m).

== History ==
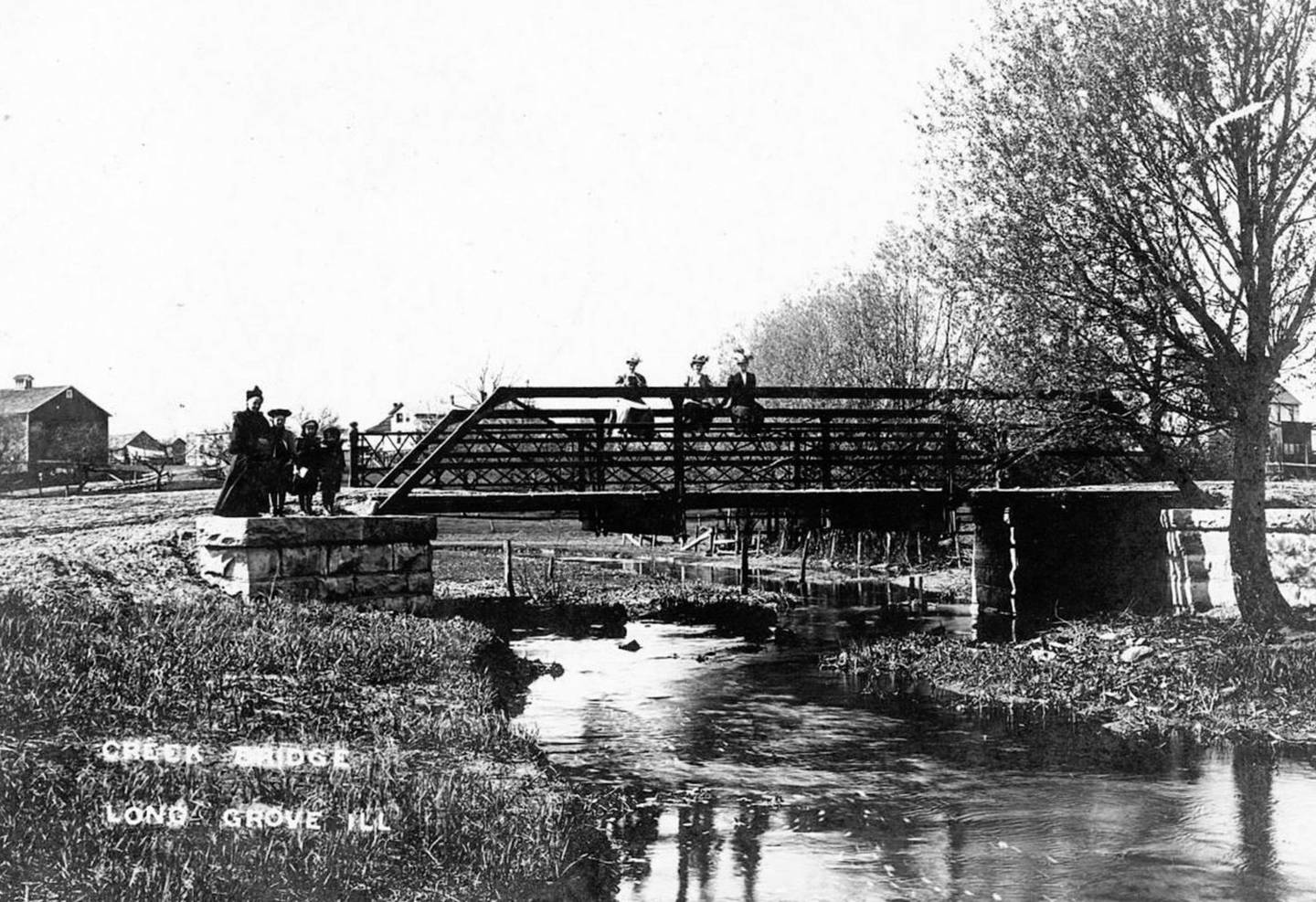
1908 postcard of Long Grove's one-lane iron truss bridge above Buffalo Creek

A Protestant church and cemetery was founded in 1846. A wooden bridge was built over Buffalo Creek in the late 1800s to connect a commerce district with the Protestant church. By the end of the nineteenth century, the expansion of the crossroads on the other side (becoming home to multiple businesses and a town hall) and the rise of the automobile introduced the need for a new, sturdier bridge. In response, the bridge that exists today was built in 1906 by the Joliet Bridge and Iron Company, and it became known as the Buffalo Creek Bridge.

Robert Parker Coffin (1917–2019) was an architect who served as president of Long Grove for over 20 years. He led the small village through the post–World War II economic expansion that threatened to bring major real estate developments and an expressway, and locals credit the present character of the town to his vision of retaining Long Grove's small-town, rural feel. In the 1980s, Long Grove Road, the road that crosses the bridge, was renamed Robert Parker Coffin Road in his honor.

The structure was deteriorating by the 1970s, with officials from the state government recommending turning it into a two-lane road on top of a culvert. Coffin and the rest of the town disagreed; instead, they opted to construct a decorative wooden covering (which Coffin designed) in 1972 to decrease its maximum height to deter heavier vehicles. During that decade, locals applied for the bridge to be listed on the National Register of Historic Places (NRHP), but the request was denied because bridges of that kind were too common. Throughout the years after installing the covering, cars would hit it occasionally and cause minor damage, but local business owners would just repair it.

=== Decline and restoration ===
The Great Recession was detrimental to downtown Long Grove, forcing two-thirds of its businesses to close, and the bridge also fell into disrepair. Landmarks Illinois listed it as one of four historic bridges that were "threatened with replacement or continued deterioration" in its 2017 "Most Endangered Historic Places" list.

This decline sparked intense debate by town leaders and residents over what to do with the bridge. Some advocated for demolishing the bridge and replacing it with a modern two-lane crossing or a smaller one just for pedestrians, or keeping the bridge but significantly raising the cover's height. Others wanted to keep the existing character and obtain funding to restore and preserve it. In 2017, the Long Grove Historical Society and the Historic Downtown Long Grove Business Association re-nominated it for the NRHP as a rare surviving bridge of its kind. This time the nomination was successful—the Buffalo Creek Bridge was formally added to the register on June 11, 2018. In 2019, the Long Grove Village Board voted 4-2 to restore the bridge.

Sixteen days later, the driver of a box truck struck the top of the bridge cover and damaged two posts and its lateral bracing, forcing it to close due to stability concerns. The cover was removed and replaced with a temporary overhead barrier, which allowed it to reopen to traffic in September 2018. Between March and June 2020, the entire bridge was moved offsite as crews replaced the abutments and repainted the bridge. A new cover—clad in wood and reinforced by steel—was added during the summer, and the $1 million renovation project concluded with a reopening ceremony on August 14. The next day, it was hit again, this time by a school bus; according to the county sheriff's office, since the reopening, there have been at least 53 bridge strikes as of June 2024. This high volume has caused the town to consider additional measures to prevent collisions: electronic height sensors, clearance bars further away from the bridge, more visible warning signage, and working with online mapping services to discourage the route when providing directions.

In 2022, the bridge was renamed as the Robert Parker Coffin Bridge in honor of Coffin, who had been a strong advocate of maintaining the charm and character of the town and bridge.

== Legacy ==
The Robert Parker Coffin Bridge is one of a small number of remaining bridges of its kind in the area. It is classified by the Illinois Department of Transportation as a "steel Pratt pony truss eyebar" bridge, of which there is only one other remaining in the Chicago area and 32 others in the state. According to an analysis of 2016 National Bridge Inventory data, it is the only extant single-lane thru truss bridge built in the Chicago metropolitan area before 1917. Of the 80 that meet those criteria in Illinois, only one other incorporates a pedestrian lane.

The bridge, described as iconic, has become a source of identity and pride for the village of Long Grove and its residents, and it is featured on the municipality's logo and welcome signs. Its tendency to be struck is a source of embarrassment or alarm to some residents, but others have embraced it as a defining feature, such as a local business named Broken Bridge Treats and a local brewing company that produces beers named "Bad Move" and "Bus Wedgie".

== See also ==
- List of bridges known for strikes
- National Register of Historic Places listings in Lake County, Illinois
