= Bayswater Subway =

Former bridge in Perth, Western Australia

Coordinates: 31.91838°S 115.91142°E

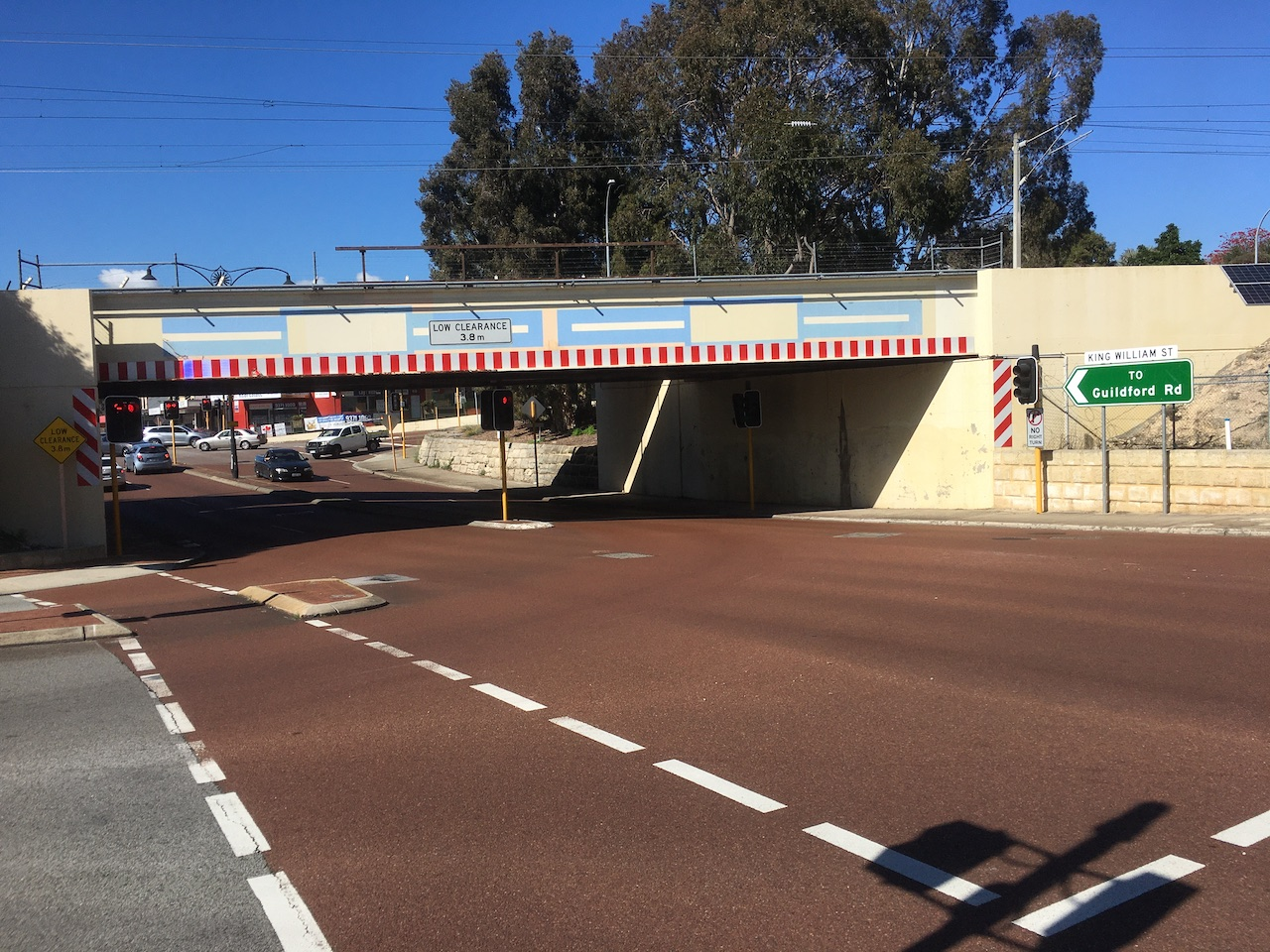
The Bayswater Subway from the north east, August 2020

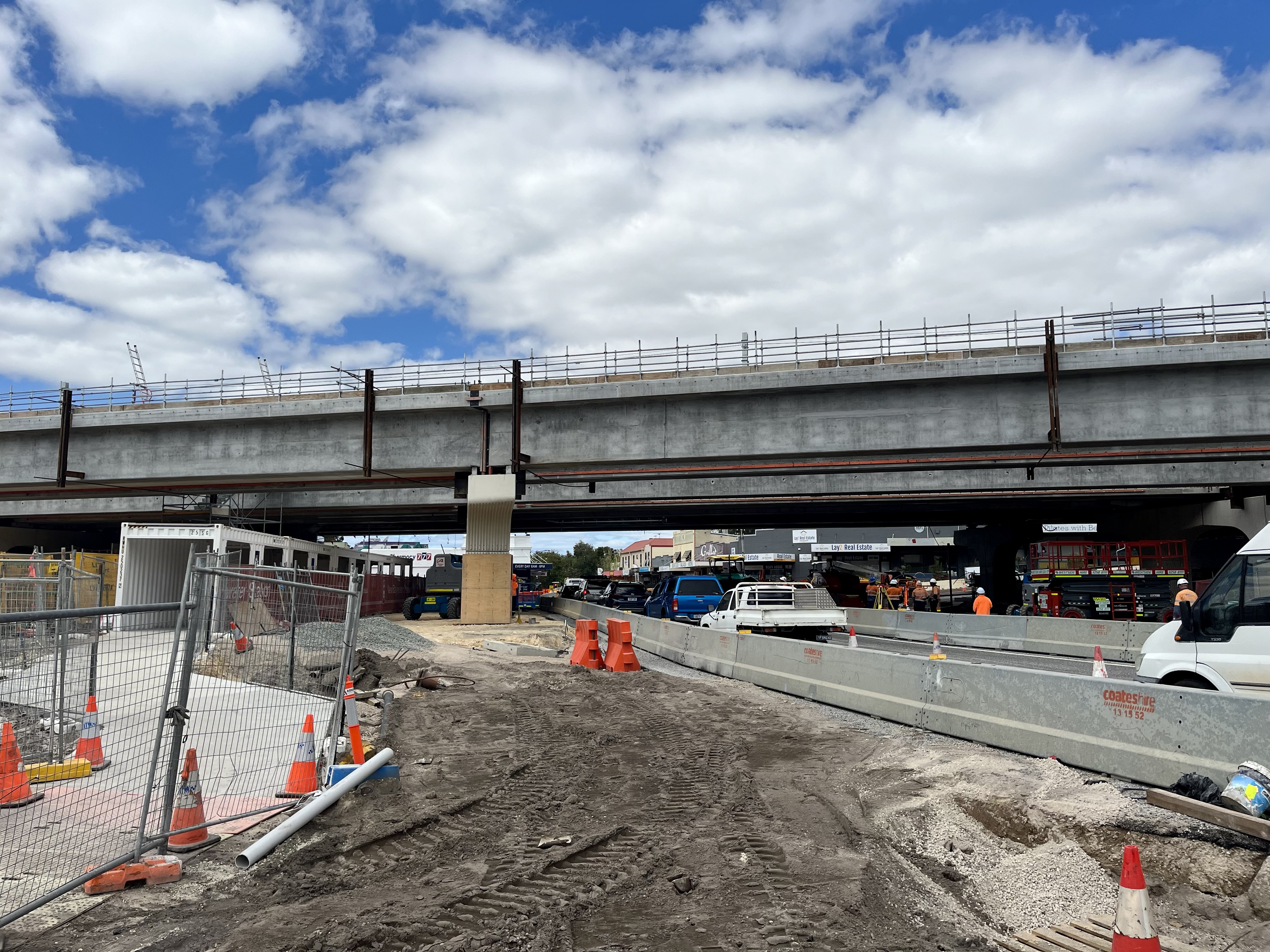
The new viaduct in September 2023

The Bayswater Subway (or Bayswater Bridge) was a road under rail subway in Perth, Western Australia. It was located immediately west of Bayswater railway station, and carried King William Street / Coode Street beneath the Midland line. The subway was demolished in April 2023 as part of Metronet's rebuild of Bayswater station.

In the later decades of its existence the bridge gained notoriety for it being frequently struck by tall vehicles due to its low clearance. Because of this it has been called an "infamous icon" of Perth.

== History ==
The bridge was first proposed in 1898, but it was not until 14 February 1910 that it was opened. It is different from the historic railway bridge over the Swan River that existed between 1897 and 1957, which at times had been referred to as the "Bayswater Bridge".

As part of the conversion of the Eastern Railway from narrow gauge to dual gauge, the original two-lane bridge was demolished in May 1969 and rebuilt with four lanes underneath. Bayswater railway station was rebuilt at the same time.

With a low clearance of 3.8 metres (12 ft 6 in), the bridge gained notoriety and received significant media coverage for frequent bridge strikes by trucks and other tall vehicles. It inspired the creation of a website that tracked the number of days since the bridge had been last hit. In September 2014, flashing low clearance signs were put on the bridge to deter drivers in tall vehicles from attempting to drive underneath the bridge. Despite this, between 2014 (when the Public Transport Authority started counting) and May 2019, the Bayswater Subway was struck by 36 vehicles. In May 2019, one of the low clearance signs fell off the bridge, landing on a vehicle and breaking its windscreen. Despite, or because of, its infamy the bridge has been called a local icon by some, including former premier Mark McGowan.

In 2021, Metronet commenced a second rebuild of Bayswater station to accommodate new rail lines. As part of the rebuild the subway was replaced by a new 4.8-metre-high (16 ft) viaduct which will also carry the new elevated station's platforms. In April 2023, the railway closed for four weeks to allow the existing railway line to be aligned to operate over the new viaduct and for the old bridge to be demolished, which occurred between 14 and 17 April 2023. Due to the notoriety of the bridge and the public interest in its demolition, a temporary viewing platform was built for the public to view the bridge's removal, and a farewell community event was held on 30 April 2023 at Bert Wright Park. Parts of the bridge will be incorporated into landscaping around the new station area, while the low clearance signage will be repurposed into public art. Signage from the bridge will also be donated to the City of Bayswater, while one such sign was donated to a local café named after the old bridge's clearance.

Although it was the best-known bridge in Perth for being hit, the Bayswater Subway was not the lowest road-under-rail bridge in Perth. The Sutherland Street bridge, in West Perth has a clearance of 3.7 metres (12 ft 2 in), and the Seventh Avenue Bridge, in Maylands had a clearance of 3.3 metres (10 ft 10 in) before it was rebuilt.

== See also ==
- List of bridges known for strikes
- Montague Street Bridge
- Norfolk Southern–Gregson Street Overpass
