= Montague Street =

Montague Street may be:

- Montague Street, London, England
- Montague Street, Melbourne, Victoria, Australia; noted for the Montague Street Bridge
- Montague Street, Brooklyn Heights, New York, United States; location of several city-landmarked buildings including the Brooklyn Trust Company Building

== See also ==
- Montague Street light rail station, at Montague Street in Melbourne
- Montague Street Tunnel, underneath Montague Street in Brooklyn
