= Montague Street Bridge =

Tram bridge in Melbourne, Victoria, Australia

Coordinates: 37°49′47″S 144°56′57″E

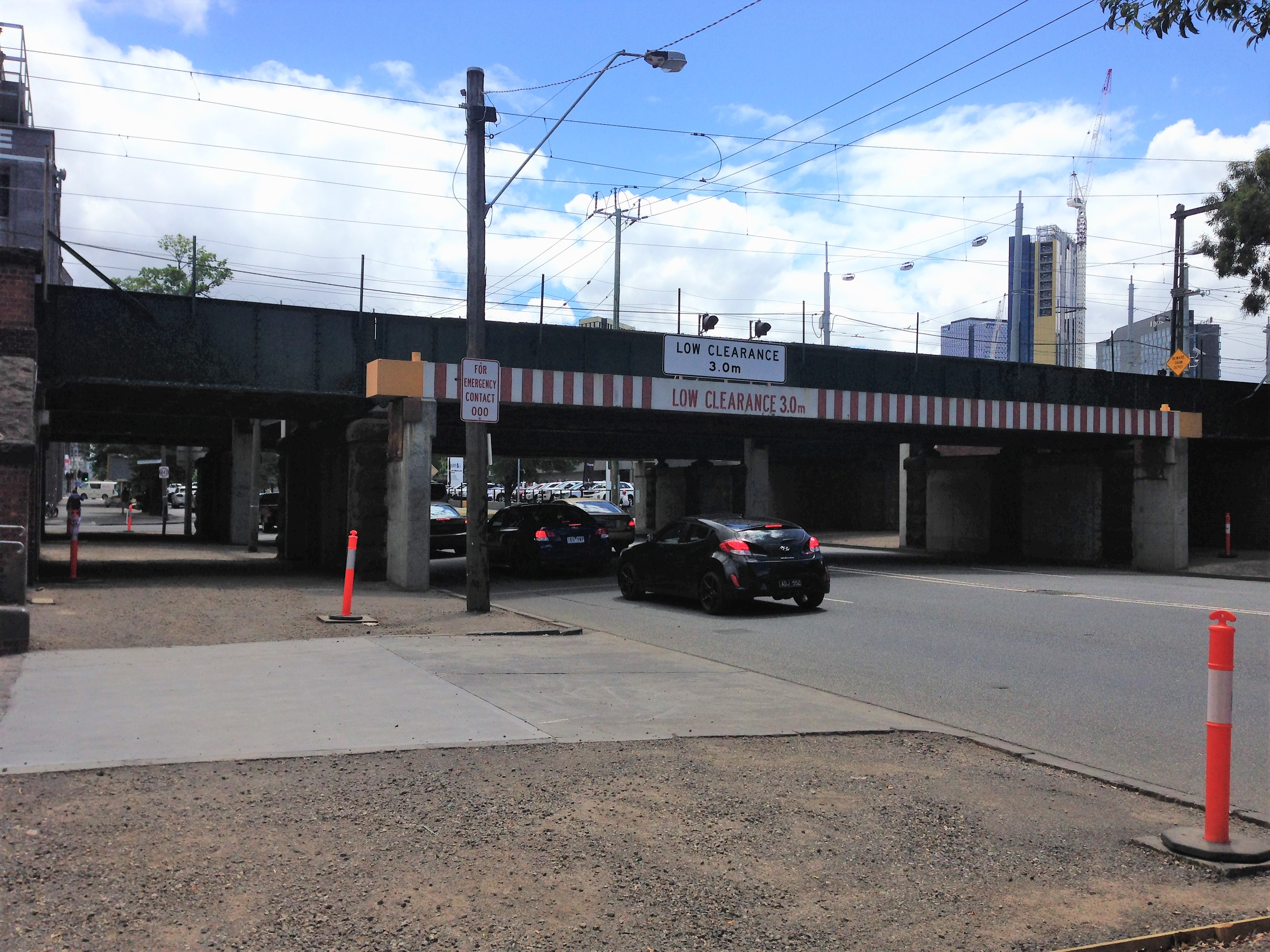
Montague Street Bridge in November 2017

The Montague Street Bridge is a railway bridge in South Melbourne, Australia, an inner suburb of Melbourne. The bridge is located at 83 Montague Street, between Woodgate Street and Gladstone Lane.

The bridge has a very low height clearance of 3 metres or 9 feet 10 inches, and despite prominent signage warning tall vehicles not to approach, drivers who miscalculate the height of their vehicles frequently collide with and sometimes become wedged under the bridge. Frequent bridge strikes have made the bridge a local landmark and the subject of much humorous media discussion.

== History ==
Construction firm Johns & Waygood was contracted to build the bridge in 1914 as part of the infrastructure of the Port Melbourne railway line. Montague Railway Station was located just south of the bridge and mainly served workers at nearby factories.

Flooding on Montague Street was a perennial problem; in 1916, the area around the bridge was under a foot of water and pedestrians could not approach it. In 1934, South Melbourne council raised the underlying street level by about two feet, thus reducing the clearance height of the bridge.

The last passenger train ran to Montague station on 10 October 1987 after it was announced that the line would be converted to light rail. The replacement light rail line was officially opened on 18 December 1987. Currently the bridge carries trams along route 109 between Box Hill and Port Melbourne.

The bridge has a long history of vehicle collisions. In 2016 'Patrick' from Epping, a caller to Jon Faine's ABC radio program, reported having witnessed a vehicle hit the bridge in 1929, aged seven. "I was there … and a truck got stuck under that bridge," he recalled. "I said to them, 'why don't you let his tyres down?'," adding that inflatable tyres were only new at the time.

Meanwhile, 'Tony' from Blackburn, who managed the South Melbourne branch of a vehicle hire business during the 1970s, recalled that five or six trucks from his branch would hit the bridge each year. "How long does it take to get something done?" Tony rhetorically asked Faine.

== Notable crashes ==
On 22 February 2016, a 3.6-metre-high (12 ft) passenger bus carrying attendees of a conference at the nearby Melbourne Convention and Exhibition Centre attempted to drive under the bridge and hit it at 56 km/h (35 mph). The impact peeled back the roof of the bus to the fifth row of seats. The driver, Jack Aston, was seriously injured, along with four women and two men, who suffered injuries including head and spinal fractures, broken collarbones and facial lacerations. Aston was convicted of negligently causing serious injury and sentenced to five years' imprisonment, but was released in 2019 after serving 10 months of the sentence when the charges were downgraded on appeal.

Another bus owned by the same company had previously crashed into the bridge in March 2006, but the company did not have a policy to tell its drivers to avoid the area.

On 20 June 2018, dashcam footage captured the moment a truck slammed into the bridge.

== Official responses ==
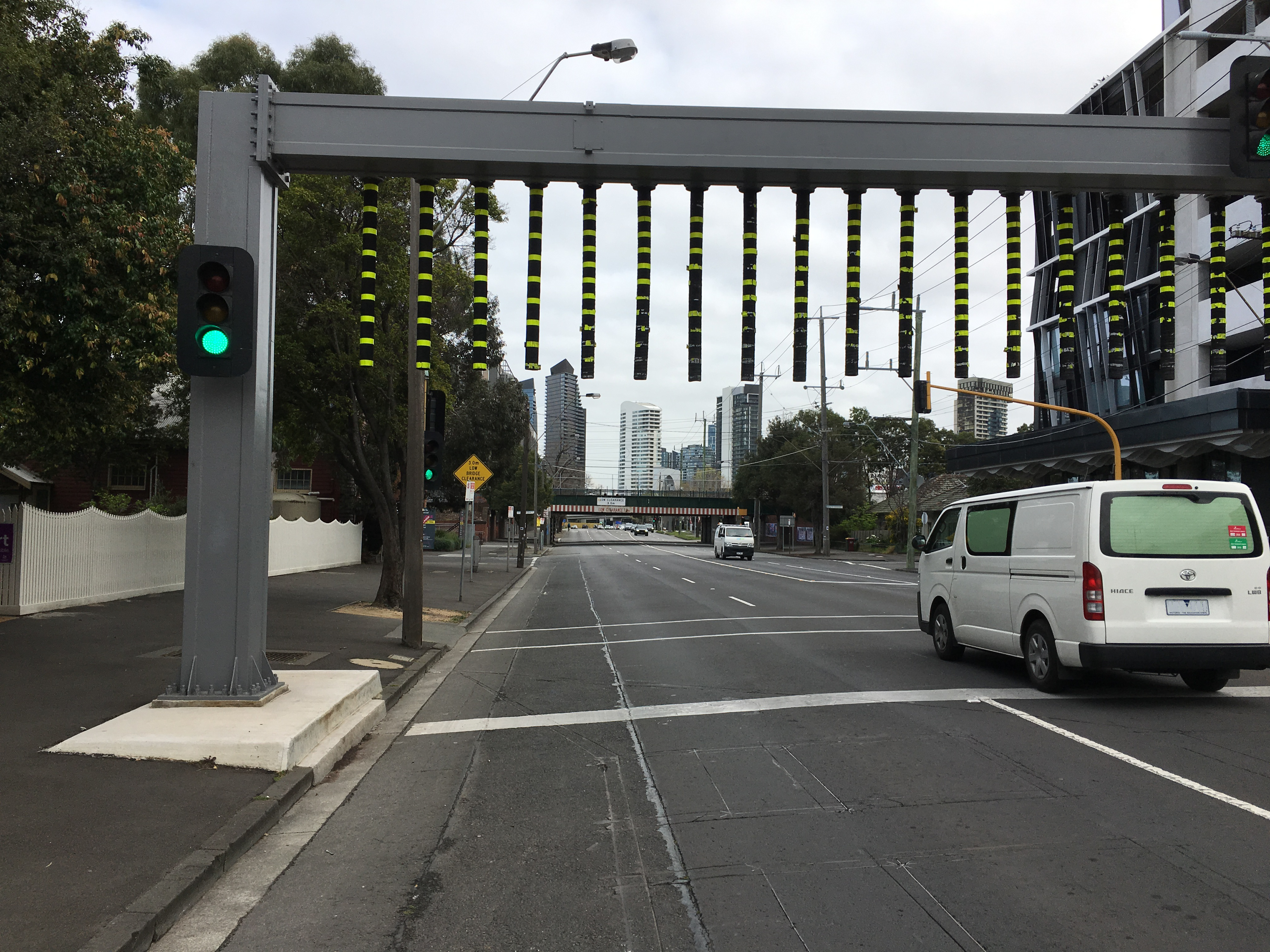
Over-height detection gantry

Following the February 2016 bus crash Victorian Premier Daniel Andrews posted on Facebook that the bridge "is fearless. It is formidable … It remains undefeated". The Victorian Government estimated that year that each collision caused $100,000 worth of costs to the Victorian economy due to the resulting traffic delays. In addition, the cost of emergency services callouts and repairing the bridge after each collision is approximately $30,000.

In June 2016, the Victorian state government installed two warning gantries on the two main approaches to the bridge on Normanby Road and City Road. Black and yellow paddles hang from the gantries to the height of the bridge; if any of the paddles hit a vehicle as it drives under the gantry, this will warn the driver to divert their course to avoid hitting the bridge. Additional signage has been installed in surrounding streets, providing a total of 26 advanced warning signs about the bridge. Following these works Premier Andrews noted that "if anyone manages to get stuck under this thing after that, well, I give up".

Since the installation of the gantries, over a dozen more vehicles crashed into the bridge – including a truck carrying sheets of glass on 13 June 2018.

On 21 May 2025, the Victorian Government announced it would implement a speed limit reduction from 60km/h to 40km/h on a stretch of Montague Street about 170 metres long on either side of the bridge. A 40km/h speed limit already applies before and after school hours.

The aim of the speed reduction is to give drivers more time to consider their vehicle's height and brake before reaching the bridge, and to reduce the severity of the damage to vehicles that continue to hit it. Within days of the speed limit reduction taking affect, the bridge was struck twice in consecutive days.

The Victorian Government considers it to be unfeasible to modify or remove the bridge. Raising it would disrupt the tram network. Lowering the road is also not possible due to electricity cables as well as water and gas pipes that are located below it. Lowering the road could also cause flooding during heavy rain.

== In the media ==
Tom Waller is the founder of the website How Many Days Since Montague Street Bridge Has Been Hit, which tracks each "championship title bout" between the bridge and its vehicular opponents. The website has been operating since February 2016 and invites crowdsourced reports of new crashes.

The bridge is also a popular topic for local TV, radio and news media, which note the frequency with which the bridge is hit. In June 2017, the Herald Sun reported, "Montague St bridge hit by truck once again", noting that "Melbourne's most-hit bridge has claimed another victim after it was struck by a truck yet again this afternoon … the third time the bridge has been hit in as many weeks."

Other media reports strike a more jocular tone: in February 2018, youth website Pedestrian.tv reported, "After 8 Months Dormant, The Awful Montague Street Bridge Has Awoken To Feed".

The bridge has its own Twitter account and Facebook page, both of which are written in the first person, as if by the bridge itself.

David Cosma has written a comedic song, 'Montague St Bridge', which includes the lyrics "Is it low?/Is it too low?/I don't know!/But I think I'm gonna go anyway."

== Similar bridges ==
The Napier Street Bridge, located in Footscray, in Melbourne's western suburbs, has a four-metre clearance and is similarly prone to vehicle crashes. Like the Montague Street Bridge, it has its own Twitter account.

The Bayswater Bridge in Perth had a clearance of 3.8 metres (12 ft 6 in), and catalogues the crashes on a website modelled on the Montague Street Bridge website. The bridge was struck eight times in 2018. It was demolished in April 2023 and replaced by a new, higher bridge as part of a rebuild of the adjacent Bayswater railway station.

The 11 foot 8 Bridge (3.56 m), (formally known as the Norfolk Southern–Gregson Street Overpass, and nicknamed "The Can-Opener"), is a railway bridge in Durham, North Carolina, US, that averages one crash a month. In October 2019, the bridge was raised 8 inches (0.20 m) to 12 feet 4 inches (3.76 m) but accidents continue.

The "Fools Bridge" in Sofia Street, Saint Petersburg, Russia, also has its own humorous Twitter account. As of 2 February 2018, 140 vehicles had become stuck under the bridge.

== See also ==
- Montague Street station
- Melbourne tram route 109
- Structure gauge
