= Tell-tale (bridges) =

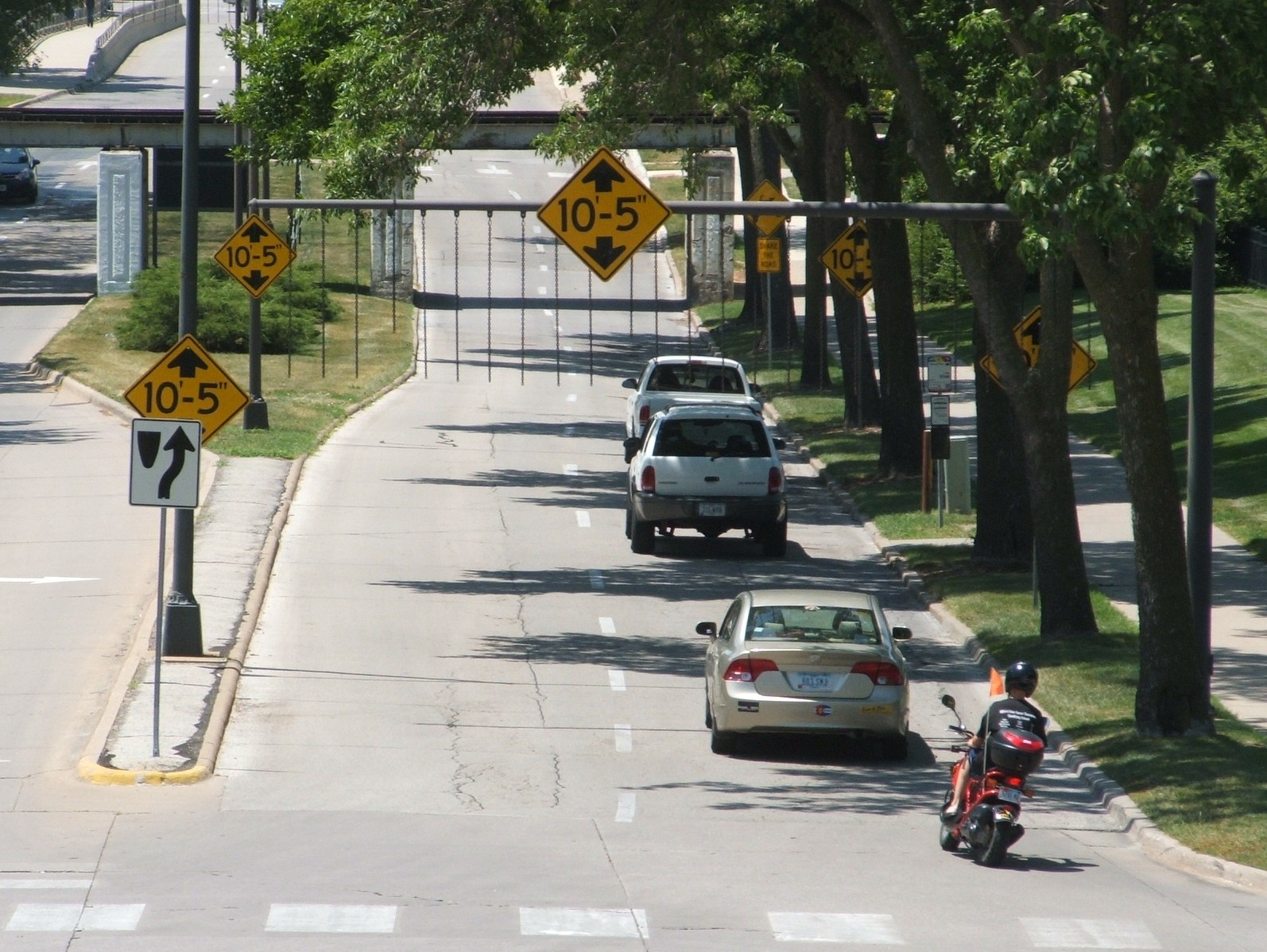
A tell-tale warning of a low clearance over a road

A tell-tale, also known as a bridge warning, is a series of ropes suspended over railway tracks to give warning to the engineer, and more importantly the brakeman who may be scampering across the tops of the cars, that the train is approaching a low-clearance obstacle, such as a tunnel or a bridge. In the US, a standard tell-tale design had ropes on 3 in (7.6 cm) centers for a width of 8 ft (2.4 m) over the track, the bottom of the ropes 6 in (15 cm) lower than the height of the obstruction, and placed at least 100 ft (30 m) before the obstruction.

Tell-tales are also used to warn trucks and other tall vehicles of low-clearance bridges on roads and highways. In this context, chains are used instead of ropes, and it is frequently the sound of the chains knocking against the truck that alerts the driver of trouble (also called "tattletale").

== See also ==
- Bridge strike
