= Buffalo Creek (Illinois) =

Stream in Illinois, United States

Buffalo Creek Wheeling Drainage Ditch
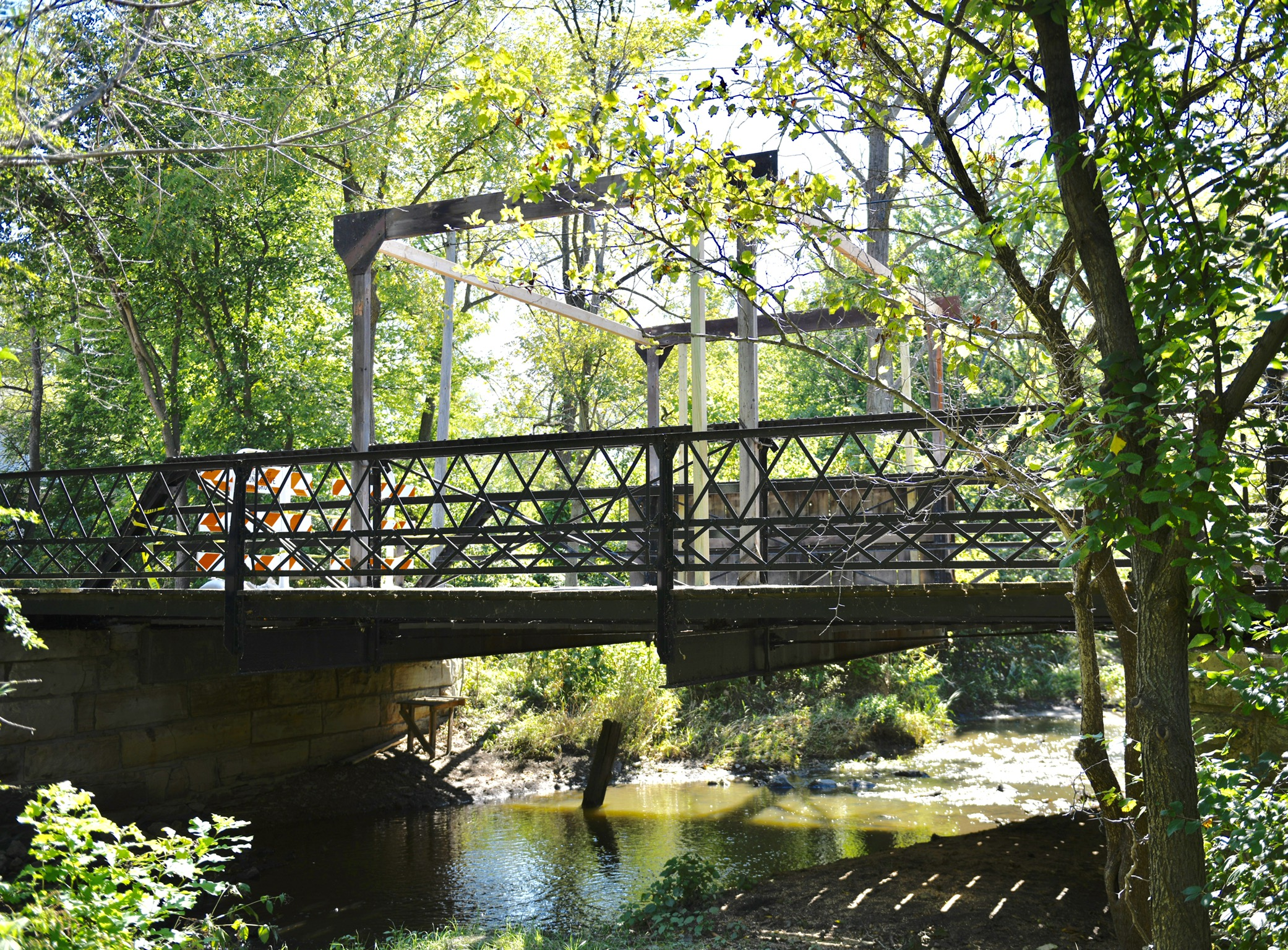

Location
- Country: United States
- State: Illinois
- County: Lake, Cook
- City: Lake Zurich, Kildeer, Long Grove, Arlington Heights, Buffalo Grove, Wheeling

Physical characteristics
- Source
  - location: Lake Zurich, Illinois
  - coordinates: 42°11′14.5″N 88°3′52.8″W
- Mouth: Des Plaines River
  - location: Wheeling, Illinois
  - coordinates: 42°7′18″N 87°53′44.4″W
- Length: 10.40 m (34.1 ft)

Buffalo Creek is an 11.2-mile-long (18.0 km) tributary of the Des Plaines River. It begins in Lake Zurich, Illinois, and flows mainly south-eastward through Kildeer, Long Grove, Buffalo Grove and Wheeling. In Wheeling, it is named the Wheeling Drainage Ditch. It joins the Des Plaines River next to Chicago Executive Airport.

== GNIS note ==
The GNIS database information dates from 1980 and does not reflect recent changes made to the mouth location during improvements at Chicago Executive Airport. The source location may also have shifted due to housing development in the area. The coordinates used in the information box are from Google Earth.
