= Long Grove, Illinois =

Village in Lake County, Illinois, United States

- Village
- Logo

- Location of Long Grove in Lake County, Illinois

- Location within Illinois
- Coordinates: 42°12′9″N 88°0′23″W
- Country: United States
- State: Illinois
- County: Lake
- Townships: Ela, Vernon
- Incorporated: 1956

Government
  - Type: Council–manager

Area
  - Total: 12.61 sq mi (32.65 km^{2})
  - Land: 12.39 sq mi (32.08 km^{2})
  - Water: 0.22 sq mi (0.57 km^{2}) 1.89%
- Elevation: 719 ft (219 m)

Population (2020)
  - Total: 8,366
  - Density: 675.4/sq mi (260.77/km^{2})
- Time zone: UTC-6 (CST)
  - Summer (DST): UTC-5 (CDT)
- ZIP codes: 60047, 60060, 60049
- North American Numbering Plan: 847, 224
- FIPS code: 17-44524
- GNIS feature ID: 2398471
- Website: www.longgroveil.gov

Long Grove is a village in Lake County, Illinois, United States, approximately 35 miles (56 km) away from and a northwest suburb of Chicago. Per the 2020 census, the population was 8,366. The village has strict building ordinances to preserve its "country atmosphere".

== History ==
The village now has very strict building ordinances to preserve its "pristine rural charm", including prohibitions on sidewalks, fences, and residential street lights. The Long Grove area is now known for its historic downtown, its exclusive million dollar homes and the annual events including the chocolate, strawberry and apple festivals that take place in May, June and September, respectively. The Robert Parker Coffin Bridge, on the edge of the city's downtown, is a historic 1906 bridge that is featured on the Long Grove's logo and welcome signs. Due to the 8-foot-6-inch (2.59 m) clearance height of its covering, it has been struck by vehicles dozens of times in recent years.

== Geography ==
According to the 2021 census gazetteer files, Long Grove has a total area of 12.61 square miles (32.66 km^{2}), of which 12.39 square miles (32.09 km^{2}) (or 98.25%) is land and 0.22 square miles (0.57 km^{2}) (or 1.75%) is water.

== Demographics ==
Historical population
Census	Pop.	Note	%±
1880	84		—
1960	640		—
1970	1,196		86.9%
1980	2,013		68.3%
1990	4,740		135.5%
2000	6,735		42.1%
2010	8,043		19.4%
2020	8,366		4.0%
U.S. Decennial Census; 2010 2020

=== Racial and ethnic composition ===
Long Grove village, Illinois – Racial and ethnic composition Note: the US Census treats Hispanic/Latino as an ethnic category. This table excludes Latinos from the racial categories and assigns them to a separate category. Hispanics/Latinos may be of any race.
Race / Ethnicity (NH = Non-Hispanic)	Pop 2000	Pop 2010	Pop 2020	% 2000	% 2010	% 2020
White alone (NH)	5,960	6,597	5,867	88.49%	82.02%	70.13%
Black or African American alone (NH)	61	97	134	0.91%	1.21%	1.60%
Native American or Alaska Native alone (NH)	0	1	6	0.00%	0.01%	0.07%
Asian alone (NH)	456	959	1,641	6.77%	11.92%	19.62%
Native Hawaiian or Pacific Islander alone (NH)	0	0	3	0.00%	0.00%	0.04%
Other race alone (NH)	0	9	21	0.00%	0.11%	0.25%
Mixed race or Multiracial (NH)	56	122	265	0.83%	1.52%	3.17%
Hispanic or Latino (any race)	202	258	429	3.00%	3.21%	5.13%
Total	6,735	8,043	8,366	100.00%	100.00%	100.00%

=== 2020 census ===
As of the 2020 census, Long Grove had a population of 8,366. The median age was 46.7 years. 23.8% of residents were under the age of 18 and 19.1% of residents were 65 years of age or older. For every 100 females there were 93.1 males, and for every 100 females age 18 and over there were 92.8 males age 18 and over.

100.0% of residents lived in urban areas, while 0.0% lived in rural areas.

There were 2,651 households in Long Grove, of which 40.6% had children under the age of 18 living in them. Of all households, 78.6% were married-couple households, 7.5% were households with a male householder and no spouse or partner present, and 11.4% were households with a female householder and no spouse or partner present. About 11.0% of all households were made up of individuals and 6.3% had someone living alone who was 65 years of age or older. The average household size was 3.16 and the average family size was 3.11.

There were 2,797 housing units, of which 5.2% were vacant. The homeowner vacancy rate was 1.9% and the rental vacancy rate was 10.4%.

=== Income and poverty ===
The median income for a household in the village was $207,188, and the median income for a family was $224,191. Males had a median income of $130,859 versus $60,610 for females. The per capita income for the village was $83,473. About 0.3% of families and 2.0% of the population were below the poverty line, including 1.2% of those under age 18 and 0.0% of those age 65 or over.

== Education ==
Long Grove is served by Kildeer Countryside Community Consolidated School District 96. There are two elementary schools (Kildeer Countryside) and (Country Meadows) and one middle school (Woodlawn) in the village. Adlai Stevenson High School is the local public High School, of District 125.

Some far north areas of Long Grove are served by Diamond Lake Elementary Schools and Middle School, but still is served by Stevenson High School.

== Notable people ==
- Edo Belli (1918–2003), modernist architect. He resided in Long Grove at the time of his death.
- Martellus Bennett – the former tight end resided in Long Grove as a member of the Chicago Bears
- Daryl Hannah – the actress was born in Chicago, and raised in Long Grove
- Page Hannah – the former actress was born in Chicago, and raised in Long Grove
- Eddie Jackson – the safety resides in Long Grove as a member of the Chicago Bears
- Jonathan Klein – the racing driver was born in Long Grove
- Brad Maynard – the former punter resided in Long Grove as a member of the Chicago Bears
- Aidan O'Connell – NFL Quarterback for the Las Vegas Raiders was born and raised in Long Grove
