= Norfolk Southern–Gregson Street Overpass =

Low bridge in North Carolina, US

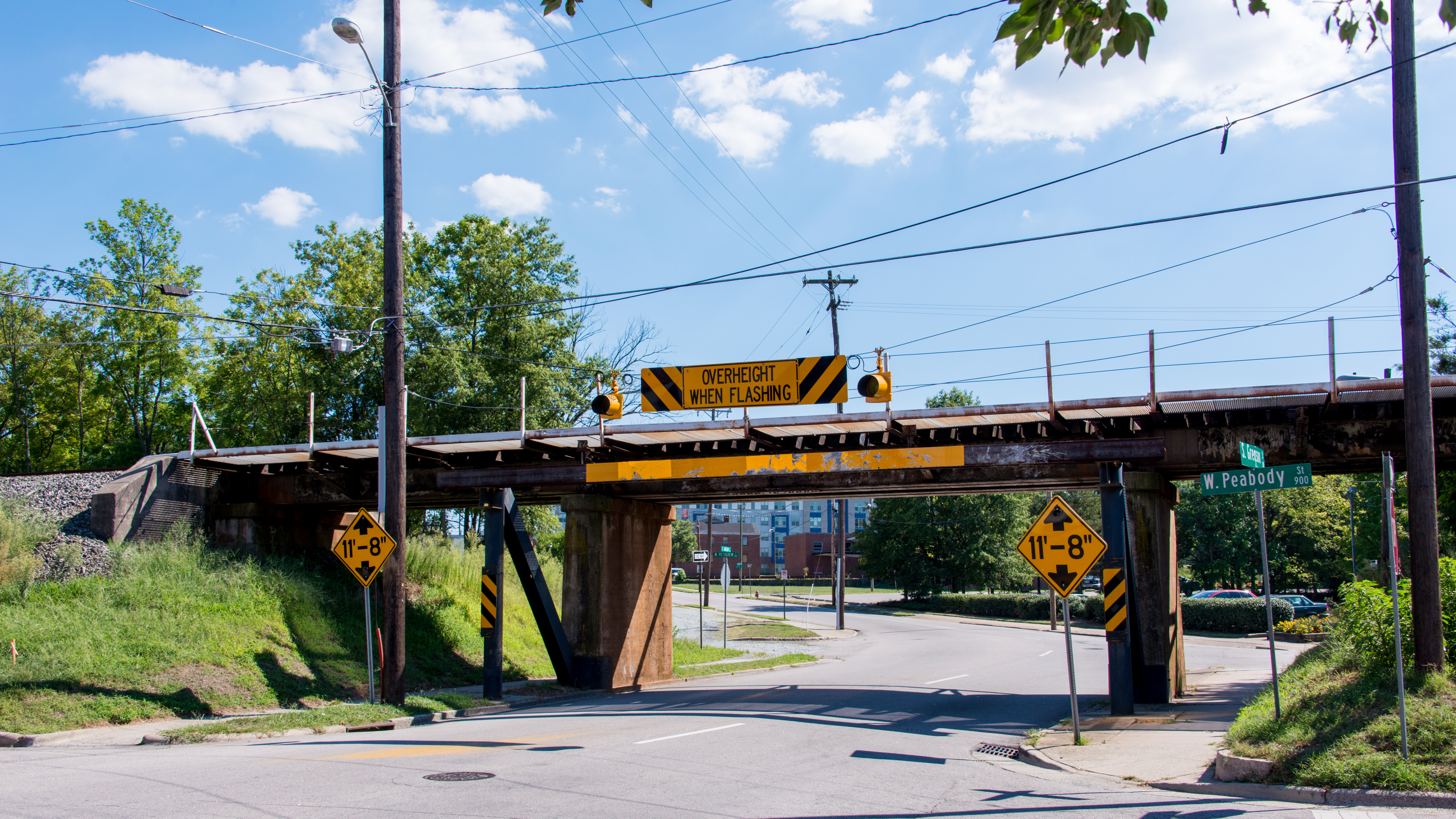
- View of overpass from its northern approach circa 2015. Photograph is before signalization was added and the warning beacons were removed.
- Coordinates: 35°59′56.8″N 78°54′36.5″W
- Carries: Amtrak; Norfolk Southern Railway
- Crosses: South Gregson Street
- Locale: Durham, North Carolina, U.S.
- Official name: Norfolk Southern–Gregson Street Overpass
- Other names: 11-foot-8 Bridge; 11-foot-8+8 Bridge; 12-foot-4 Bridge; Can Opener Bridge; The Can Opener; Gregson Street Guillotine
- Owner: North Carolina Railroad
- Structure Number: 000000000630068

Characteristics
- Design: Stringer/Multi-beam or Girder
- Material: Steel
- Total length: 92 ft (28 m)
- No. of spans: 2
- Clearance below: 12 ft 4 in (3.76 m)

History
- Opened: 1940
- Rebuilt: October 2019

Statistics
- Daily traffic: 11,000 (2003) with 6% of truck traffic

Location
- Interactive map of Norfolk Southern–Gregson Street Overpass

The Norfolk Southern–Gregson Street Overpass (also known as the 11-foot-8 Bridge or the Can Opener Bridge (Note: Other names include the "11-foot-8+8 Bridge" post-raising and "The Gregson Street Guillotine".)) is a railroad bridge in Durham, North Carolina, United States. Built in 1940, the bridge carries passenger and freight trains over South Gregson Street in downtown Durham and functions as the northbound access to the nearby Durham Amtrak station.

The bridge was designed in the 1920s with a vehicle clearance of 11 feet 8 inches (3.56 m), the standard height at the time. Since 1973, the standard clearance for bridges has been increased to a minimum height of 14 feet (4.27 m), although bridges constructed before this date were not required to be rebuilt to meet this requirement. Despite numerous warning signs about the low clearance, a large number of trucks, buses, and RVs have collided with the overpass at high speed, tearing off roof fixtures, and at times shearing off the trucks' roofs, earning the bridge the nicknames the "Can Opener" and the "Gregson Street Guillotine".

The bridge gained fame after a nearby office worker, Jürgen Henn, set up cameras in 2008 to track the collisions with the bridge.

A March 2014 report stated that three injuries had been recorded, with rebuilding the bridge a low-priority concern. In October 2019, the North Carolina Railroad Company raised the bridge by 8 inches (20 cm) to 12 feet 4 inches (3.76 m) to reduce collisions and to eliminate the grade difference between the level crossing nearby and the bridge itself, although it is below the standard height. Collisions involving vehicles that are too tall to safely pass under the bridge continue to occur.

== History ==
The bridge was designed in the 1920s and built in 1940 by the Southern Railway. The railroad is located near various industrial buildings that at one time hosted tobacco and textile businesses.

As early as the 1960s, several low bridges in Durham were impeding the area's industry as larger trucks began supplementing rail haulage. The bridge on Gregson Street in particular was deemed "the granddaddy stopper-of-them-all", having experienced at least seven collisions from trucks, which incurred $20,000 in damage in 1968. North Carolina attempted to fix the problem but was unable to obtain federal funding; the accepted method of ameliorating it at the time was to deepen the road beneath the Railway, since the Railway could not afford to rebuild the bridge altogether. As years passed, this option would eventually become impractical, as it would require moving sewer lines and water pipes below the road surface, which would come at a high cost and cause important utilities to be shut down for weeks to months.

== Official actions ==
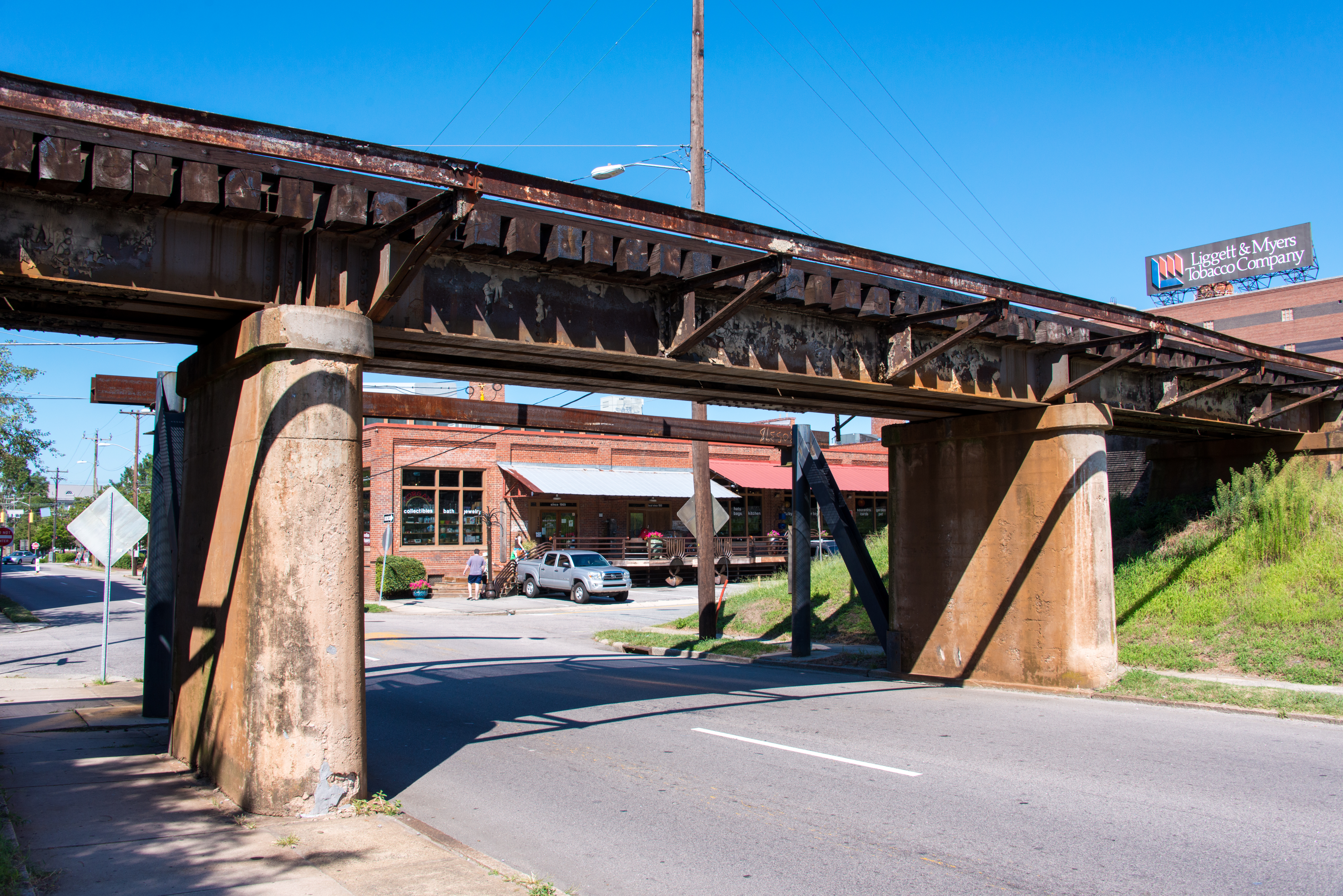
A view from under the bridge, facing traffic. Just below the bridge is a wide-flange steel H-beam to protect it from over-height trucks. The beam's web is horizontal to better absorb the shear force of truck collisions. The vertical flanges spread the impact.

The state of North Carolina owns the North Carolina Railroad Company, which owns the land and the bridge. North Carolina Railroad owns no rolling stock, but leases tracks to Amtrak and Norfolk Southern Railway. A heavy steel crash beam protects the bridge from over-height trucks but does not prevent crashes or protect the trucks, instead acting to create a "can opener effect" equivalent to the opening of a sardine can where the top of the over-height truck is peeled back from its frame. The crash beam has been hit so often that it had to be replaced at least once.

The problem is complicated by the location of Peabody Street, which runs parallel to the tracks, and intersects Gregson. Not all trucks traveling on Gregson will continue under the bridge. Some large trucks must turn right onto Peabody to make their deliveries. Over-height trucks are allowed on Gregson, as long as they turn just before the bridge.

=== New traffic signal ===
In May 2016, the city installed a traffic signal at the intersection and removed the yellow warning beacons. When an over-height vehicle approaches, the signal cycles to red and a blank-out sign affixed to the signal's mast arm illuminates and flashes the message "OVERHEIGHT MUST TURN" in white. The signal will turn green even if the over-height vehicle chooses not to turn. The signal's long delay was intended to notify drivers that their vehicles would not fit under the bridge. On May 12, 2016, the signal was implemented. No additional crashes occurred until July 7, 2016. Trucks have continued to hit the bridge, possibly because the local buses fit underneath, despite the sensors displaying the overheight message. Drivers of other vehicles may think the flashing warning is triggered by a nearby vehicle rather than their own. In some cases, the over-height object is an air conditioning unit or vent on a RV, which may be too small for the sensor to detect.

=== Traffic separation study ===
In 2014, the North Carolina Department of Transportation (NCDOT) Rail Division, the city of Durham, and Kimley-Horn completed a traffic separation study of 18 rail crossings over a 12-mile (19 km) section of the railroad. The Gregson Street overpass is within the study's subject area. The study focused on eliminating at-grade crossings, not on fixing grade-separated crossings such as the one at Gregson. There have been four deaths and two injuries in the study area since 1991, compared to three minor injuries at Gregson.

The study recommended replacing the bridge at Roxboro Street because it has a vertical clearance of 11 feet 4 inches (3.45 m), and "many trucks have gotten stuck under the Roxboro Street railroad bridge." Local news stations have reported crashes at this site.

=== Raising ===
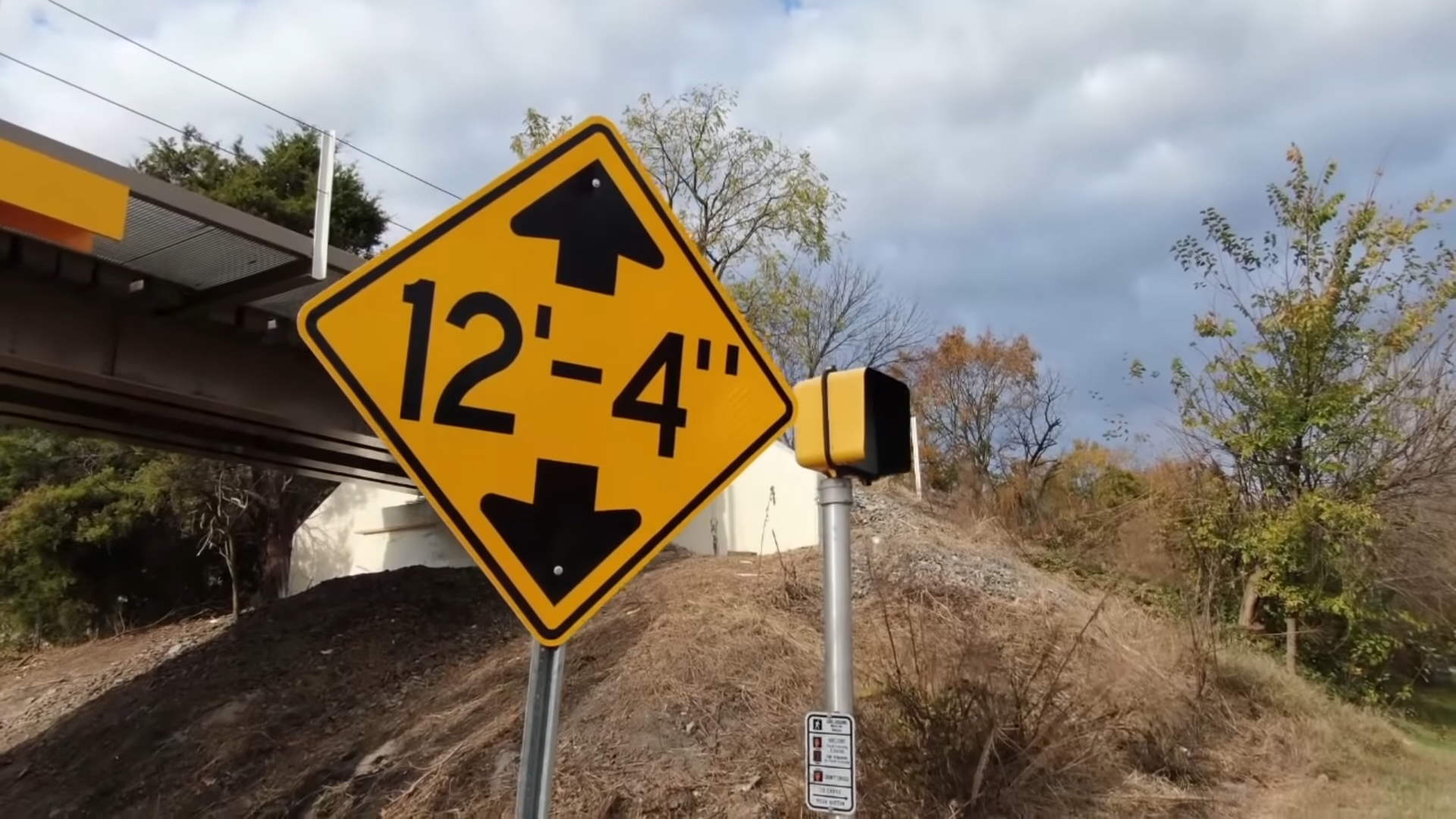
New sign at the bridge

In October 2019, the North Carolina Railroad Company began work to raise the bridge by 8 inches (0.20 m) as part of a $500,000 project to improve safety and reduce damage to the span. The bridge was raised to a new height of 12 feet 4 inches (3.76 m), the maximum clearance that would not affect the grades of nearby crossings. It was further stated that the grade had to be improved for safety reasons to allow the trains to go faster. The entire project was expected to take two weeks to complete, although the actual raising on October 30, 2019, only took eight hours.

The new height is lower than the typical bridge clearance, so the warning signal system and the guard barrier remain in place. Twenty-two days after it was raised, another collision occurred on November 26, 2019. The bridge continues to snag some vehicles, as captured by the 11'8" website.

== Media and internet coverage ==
A section of one of Henn's videos showing a truck hitting the bridge

Jürgen Henn, who works in a nearby office, mounted several video cameras to record the crashes from different angles. Since April 2008, he has recorded over 180 crashes, and posted them on YouTube. The videos gradually attracted the attention of a local TV station, and eventually progressed to international media attention.

The bridge is only one of several under-height bridges in the area that trucks frequently crash into; however, the videos became popular, and brought this particular bridge to international media attention, including front-page coverage in The Wall Street Journal, on an episode of the Comedy Central television show Tosh.0, on an episode of the CBC Radio radio program As It Happens in Canada, on the Portuguese language Brazilian TerraTV, on Stuff in New Zealand, in the Hebrew language Israeli newspaper Maariv, in the Spanish language Peruvian newspaper El Comercio, on the Irish iRadio, in the Danish newspaper Ekstra Bladet, on news.com.au in Australia, on the Italian language radio station Rai Radio 2, on the French television news channel La Chaîne Info, and on a video by YouTuber videogamedunkey.

The bridge is featured in the music video for the M.J. Lenderman song "Wristwatch".

== See also ==
- List of bridges known for strikes
- Bridge strike
