= Bridge strike =

Type of accident

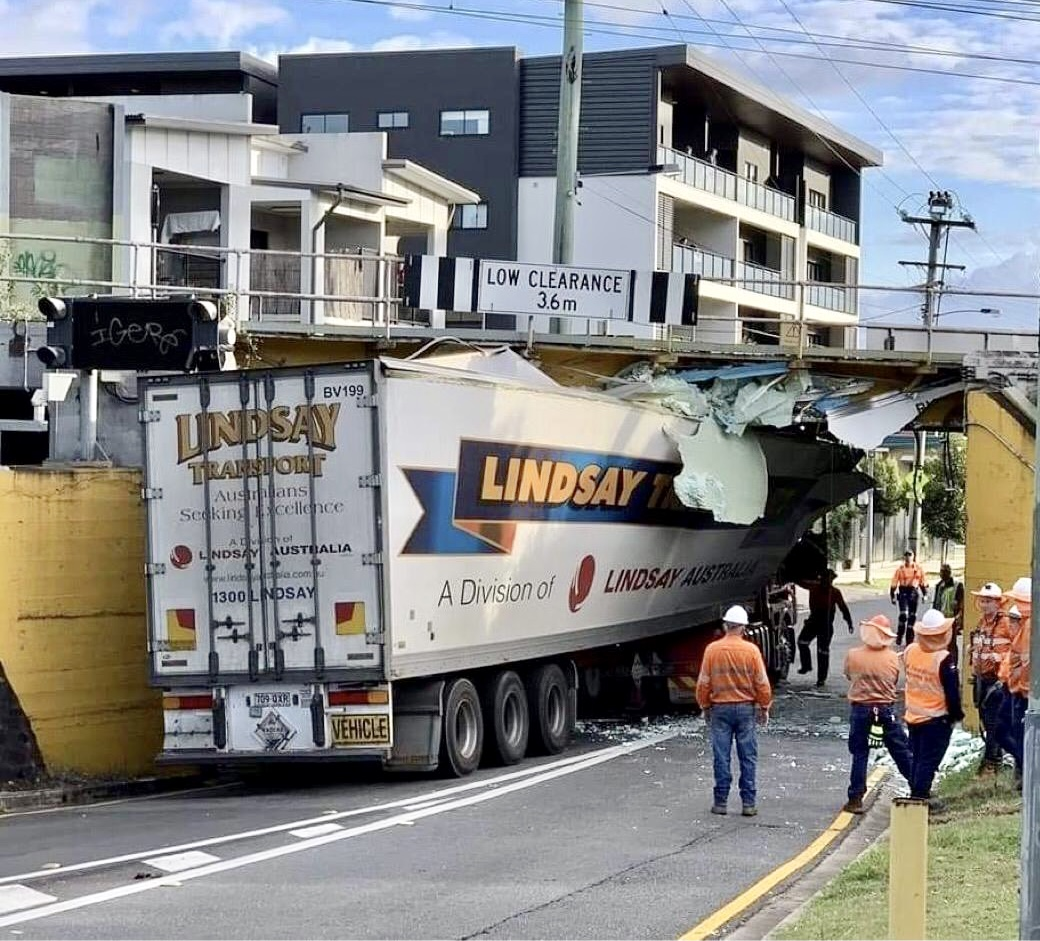
Bridge strike in Brisbane, Australia

Bridge strike or tunnel strike (also known as bridge bashing) is a transport accident in which a vehicle collides with a bridge, overpass, or tunnel structure. Bridge-strike road accidents, in which an over-height vehicle collides with the underside of the structure, occur frequently and are a major issue worldwide. In waterways, the term encompasses water vessel–bridge collisions, including bridge span and support structure collisions.

== Impacts ==
In United Kingdom, railway bridge strikes (called "bridge bashing") happen on an average of once every four and a half hours, with total of 1789 times in 2019. Several bridges have been hit over 20 times in a single year. The total cost borne by the state was around £23 million. In Beijing, China, 20% of all bridge damage is caused by bridge strike. Texas Department of Transportation estimated in 2013 that an average cost to repair a bridge strike is US$180,000.

Strikes that don't damage the bridges can significantly damage the vehicles. There are many examples of buses having their roof completely cut off by bridge strike, such as Birkenhead in 2014, Long Island in 2018, and Glasgow in 2023. Local communities also incur costs related to strikes without bridge damage, including those due to road closures, police response and cleanup. From 2021 to 2022, Network Rail lost £12 million in train delay and cancellation fees.

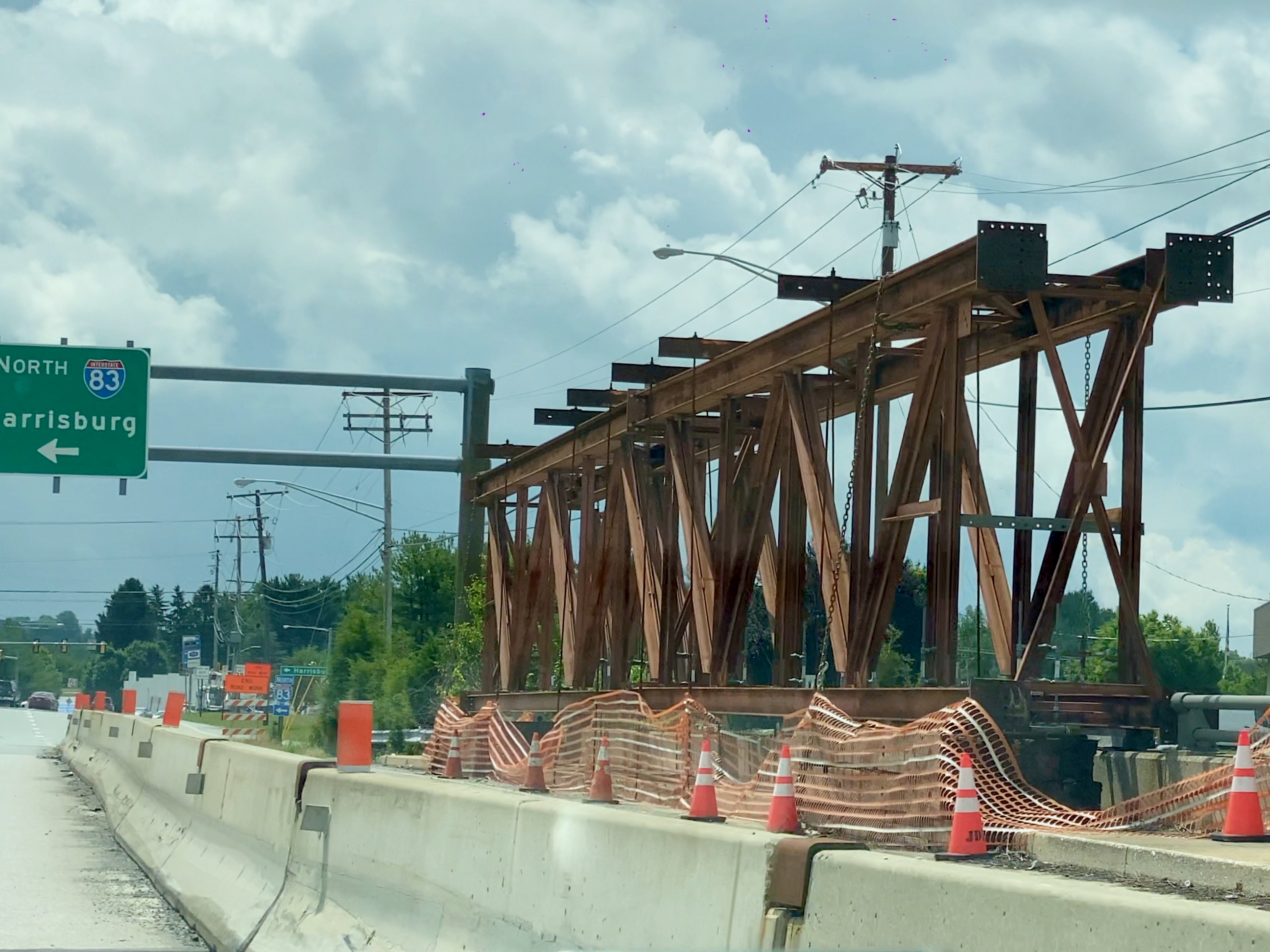
Stabilizing frame installed as a temporary repair of a bridge strike

The severity of damage to bridges caused by strikes can vary depending on the type of impact and the differences in damage resistance among bridges. Some of them are not structural damages and only minor repairs are required. Some major structural damages require extensive repairs, for example, an overpass strike in Nashville in 2018 caused a structural beam to be twisted, resulting in repair cost of nearly one million US dollars. Repairs of structural damages can be a long and complicated process. In order to allow traffic to get moving as soon as possible, officials may need to implement emergency repairs before permanent repair solutions can be implemented. For example, a bridge strike in York County, Pennsylvania in 2022 required a large temporary stabilizing frame to be added to the top of the bridge. After the second strike on the same spot six months later, the permanent repair was further delayed and the estimate costs of the permanent repair increased to US$1.5 million.

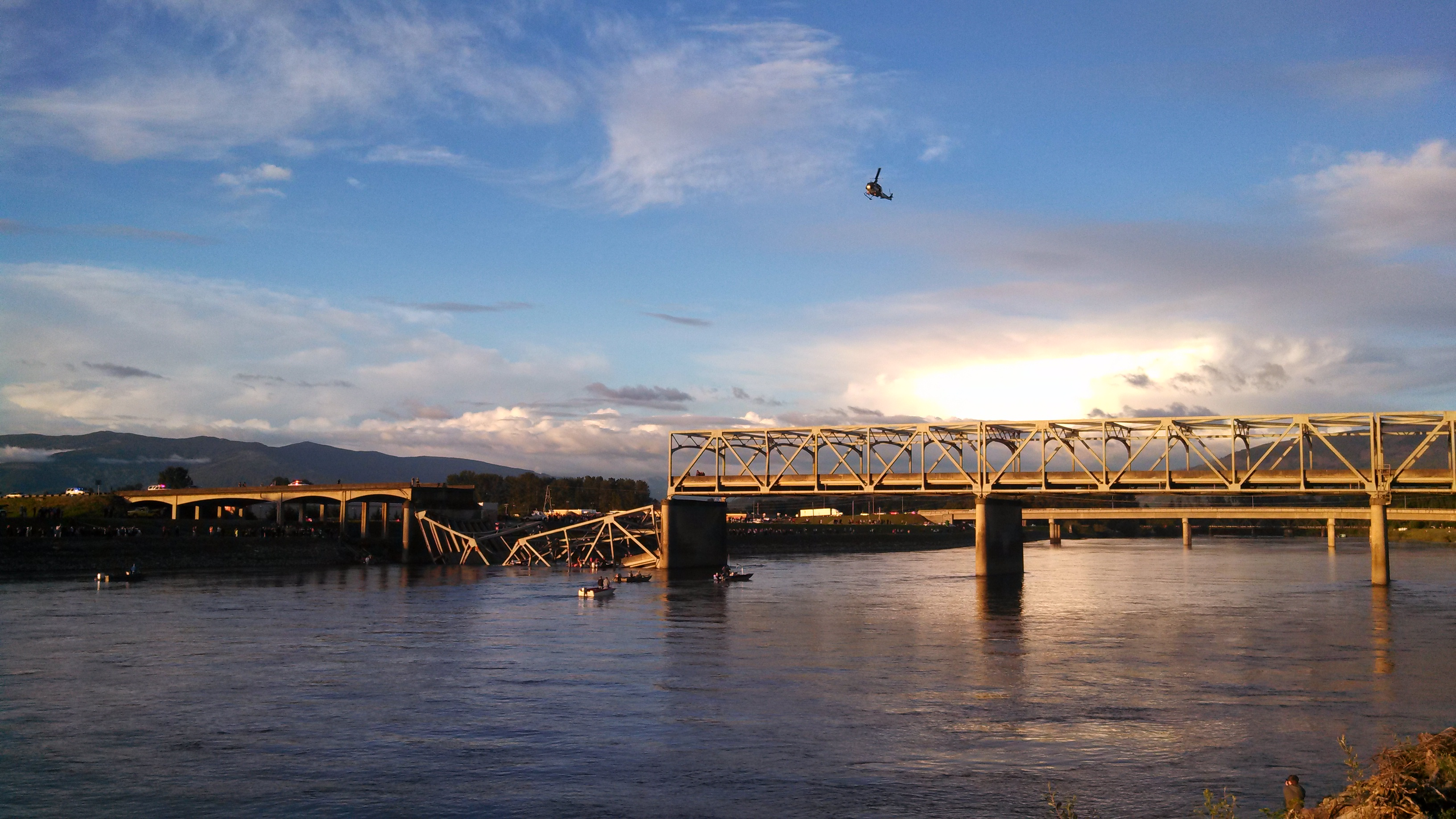
I-5 Skagit River bridge collapsed

A single bridge strike may result in a catastrophic bridge damage. An example of that is the I-5 Skagit River bridge collapse. The collapse was caused by a truck with an oversize load that was taller than the clearance above of the bridge. The bridge was a steel through-truss bridge with a "fracture-critical" design that has non-redundant load-bearing beams. An impact of the oversize load to multiple sway braces was enough to damage load-bearing members and caused a span to be collapsed, resulting in vehicles falling down to the river with three minor injuries.

Beyond damages and economic impacts, bridge strikes can result in serious injuries and fatalities. In 1994, five passengers of a double-decker bus were killed by a low-bridge strike in Glasgow. In 2010, a rail bridge strike of a double-decker bus on a New York parkway killed 4 passengers. In the United States, 13 people died in bridge strike accidents between 2014 and 2018. In 2022, a truck carrying liquified petroleum gas scraped the underside of a low bridge in Boksburg, South Africa, causing an explosion that killed at least 8 people.

== Mitigations ==
=== Warning signs ===
Some countries have standards on minimum vertical clearance of roadway. Any structures that do not meet that clearance would need to have warning signs. The United Kingdom has a standard on minimum clearance of a public highway at 16 feet 6 inches (5.03 m). Any bridges that do not meet the clearance requirement are considered to be "low bridges" and they require to have signage to indicate the clearance.

In United States, the Manual on Uniform Traffic Control Devices requires the placement of warning signs for any structure with vertical clearance less than 12 inches (30 cm) more than the legal maximum vehicle height. Warning signs installed on the structure can use either diamond or rectangle shapes, while advanced warning signs, must be diamonds. States, not the federal government, set maximum vehicle heights. The most common maximum, used by 32 eastern states, is 13 feet 6 inches (4.11 m). This effectively sets a requirement for signage at structures in those states lower than 14 feet 6 inches (4.42 m). Higher legal maximum vehicle height limits used in other states.

There is a variety of shapes, colors and designs used for low clearance and height limit warning signs, indication signs, and prohibition signs used worldwide.

In United Kingdom, there is an emphasis on making low clearance structures be more noticeable to drivers. This includes having large "LOW BRIDGE" letters and hazard marking on the low bridges. It has various warning signs including warning signs at or near the structures, advanced warning signs, and road markings. For advanced warning signs, there can be large panel with alternative route information. Similarly in Australia, advanced traffic instruction signs are used to provide clearance information of a low-clearance bridge ahead and accompanied by a detour direction.

Warning signs

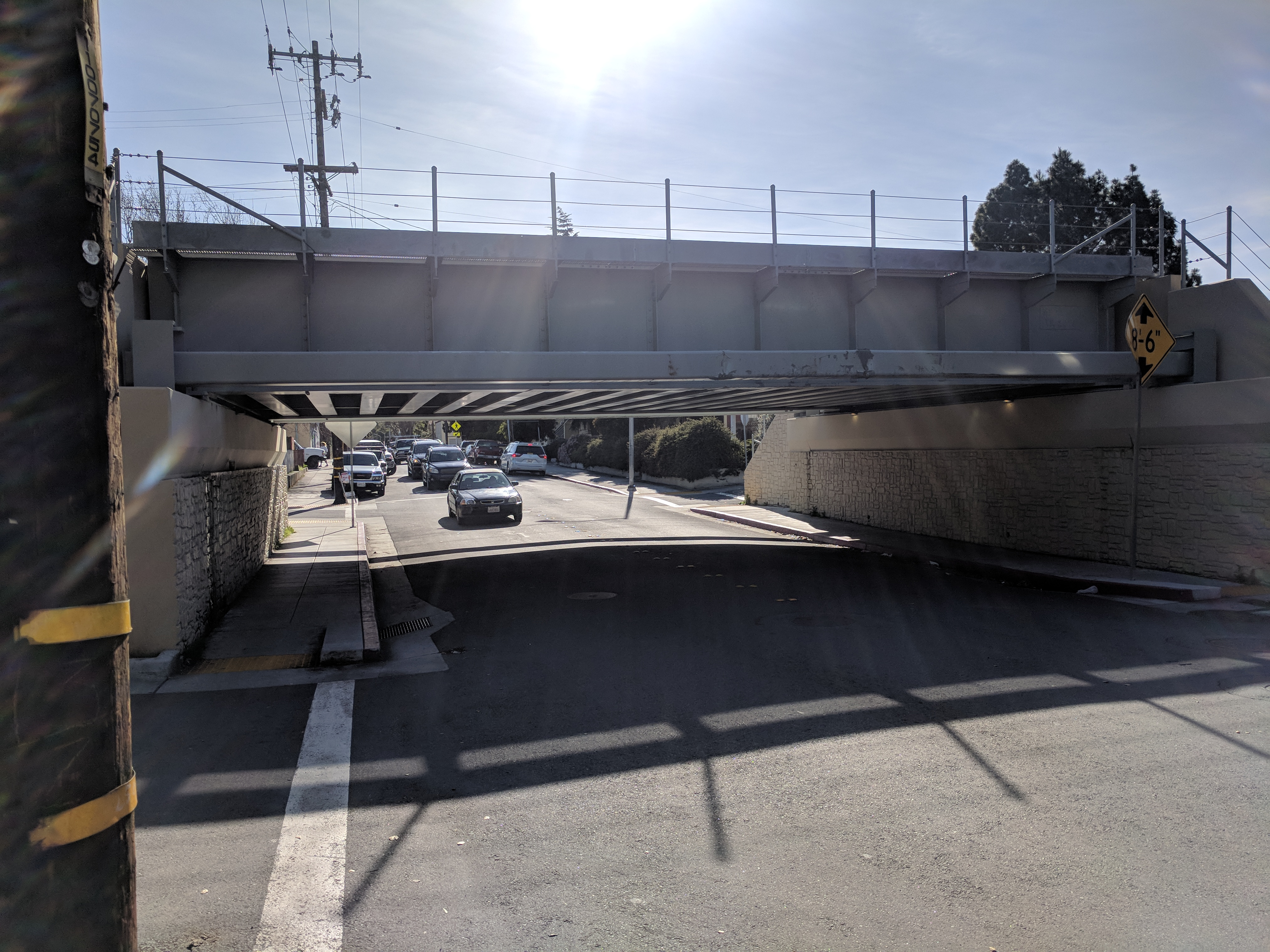
Low clearance warning sign that is hard to see

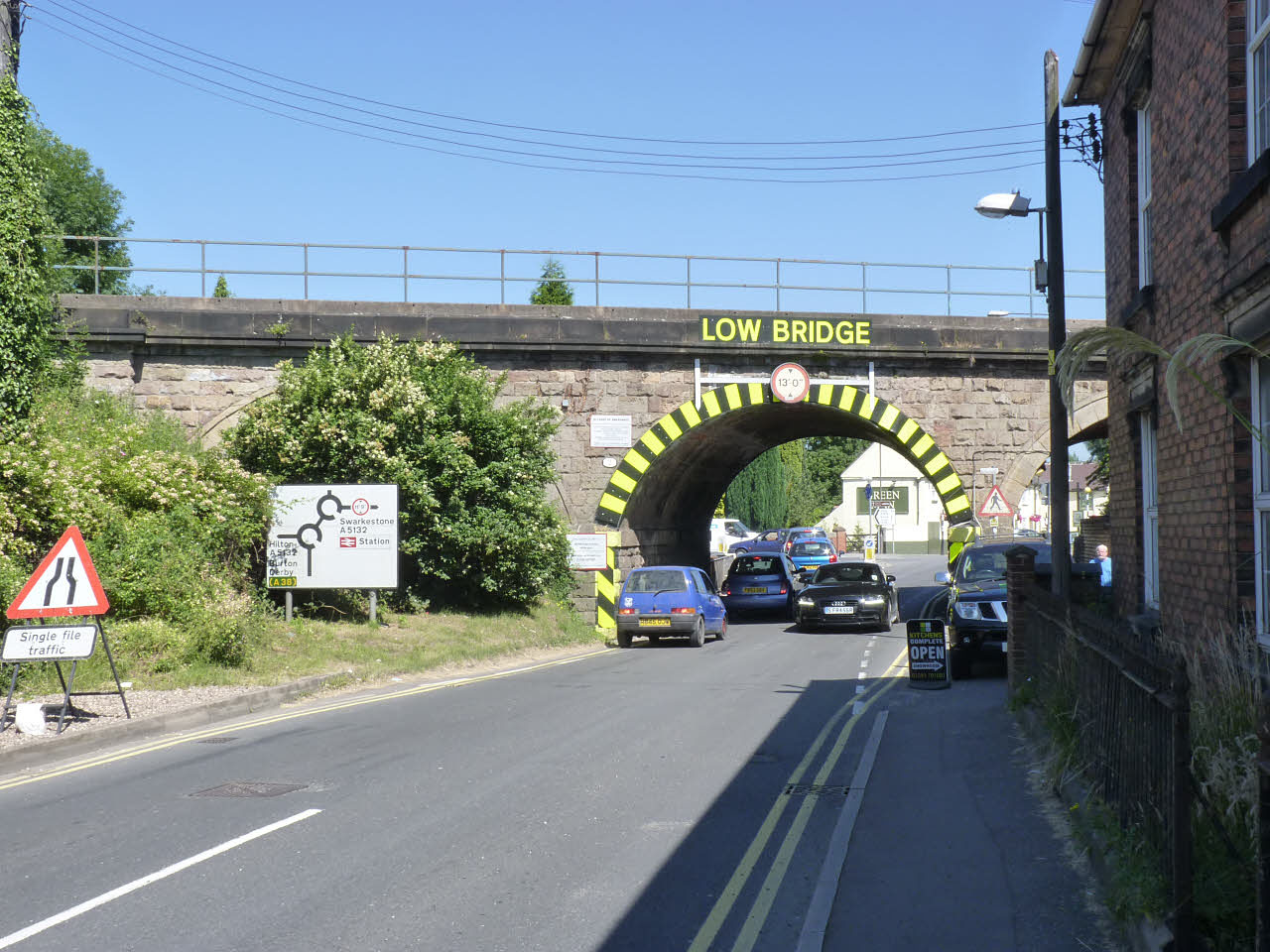
Large "low bridge" sign with hazard marking on the bridge

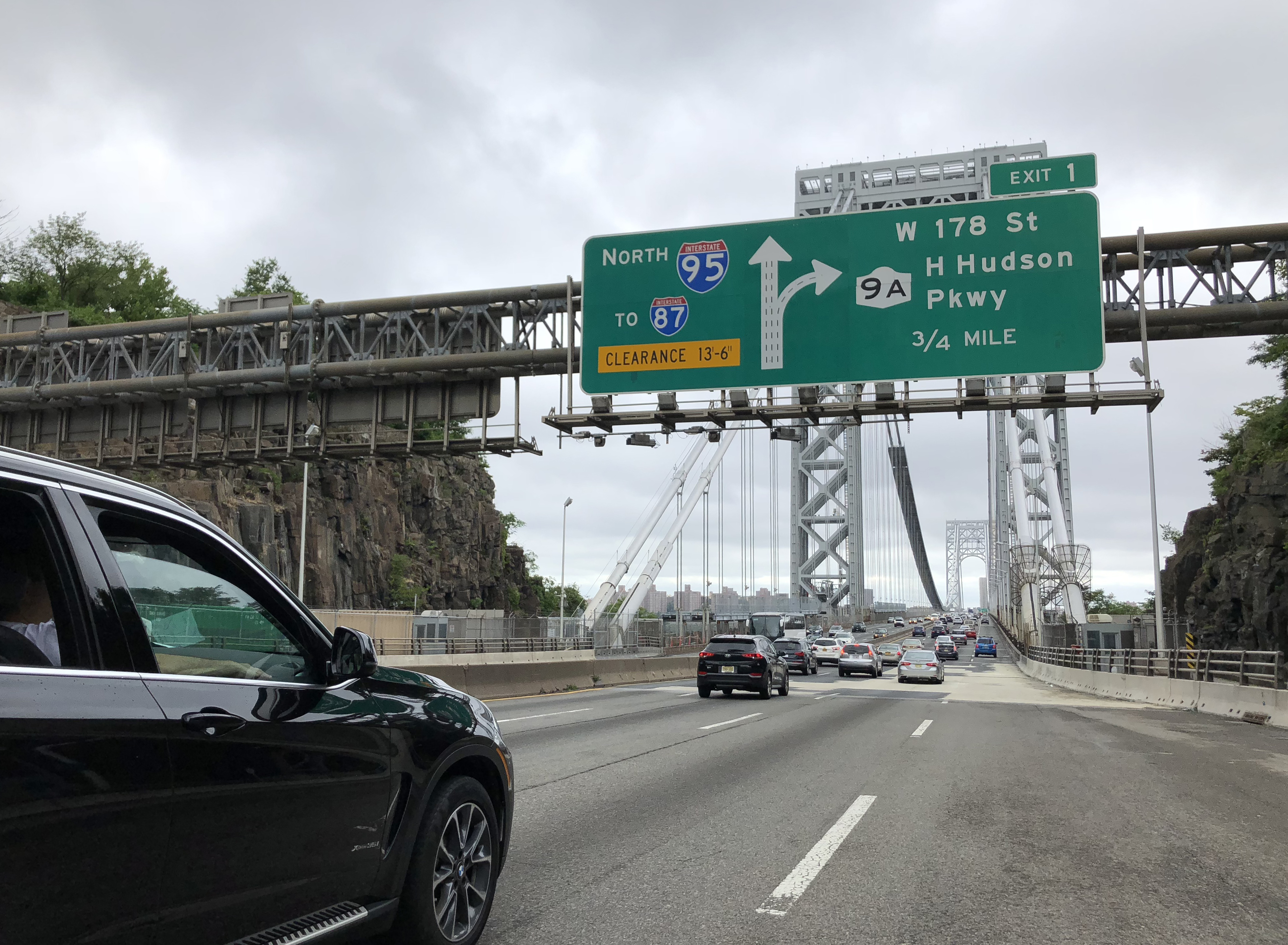
Low clearance advanced warning sign

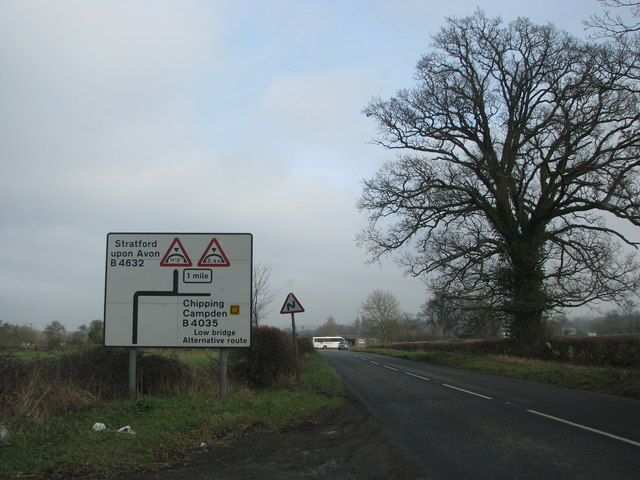
Advanced warning with alternative route information

=== Passive devices ===
Speed limits along with road narrowing, speed bumps, rumble strip or other traffic calming techniques can be used to force reducing vehicle speeds to prevent bridge strikes.

Tattle tales are series of chains suspended from an overhead gantry over the roadway. The gantry is also equipped with warning signs and other markings. The chain are set to the clearances of the approaching low-clearance structures. When any parts of vehicles hit the chains, it creates noises to notify drivers so they can pay attention to the height restriction signs. Sometime a bar is hung at the bottom of the chains to make it more noticeable to drivers. This type of devices only works in low speeds. High speed vehicles can run through without giving out enough noticeable noises to the drivers.

In special situations where the clearance of a structure is reduced longitudinally, the beginning part of the structure may give an appearance that it provides enough clearance for vehicles to go through. As the vehicles are driven under it, the clearance is reduced. The vehicles may be wedged and stuck under the structure as it is too late for drivers to realize that it is not enough clearance to go all the way through. In this case, false soffits can be added to the beginning part of the structure. The false soffits are flaps that extend down from the underside of the structure to match the lowest clearance of the entire structure to provide visual aid to drivers of the actual clearance that they will be facing. There can be hazard markings on the false soffits to make them highly visible.

Other devices include scarifying structures. These structures are installed in front of the bridges or tunnels with the heights of the clearance to absorb the impacts of overheight vehicles. The primary goal of using scarifying structures is to prevent damage to the bridge and tunnel structures. Height restriction bars can be installed ahead of the structure to ensure that overheight vehicles will not be able to approach the low-clearance structure. Collision protection beams are installed right in front or at the structures. They take the impacts and dissipate the energy from bridge strikes to prevent damages to the structures. As the goal of these devices are to protect the structures, they are used as the last resort without providing any benefits to crash prevention. Without other devices, risks to vehicles still hold. In 2019, a bus in Dubai crashed onto a height restriction bar, resulting in several fatalities.

Passive devices

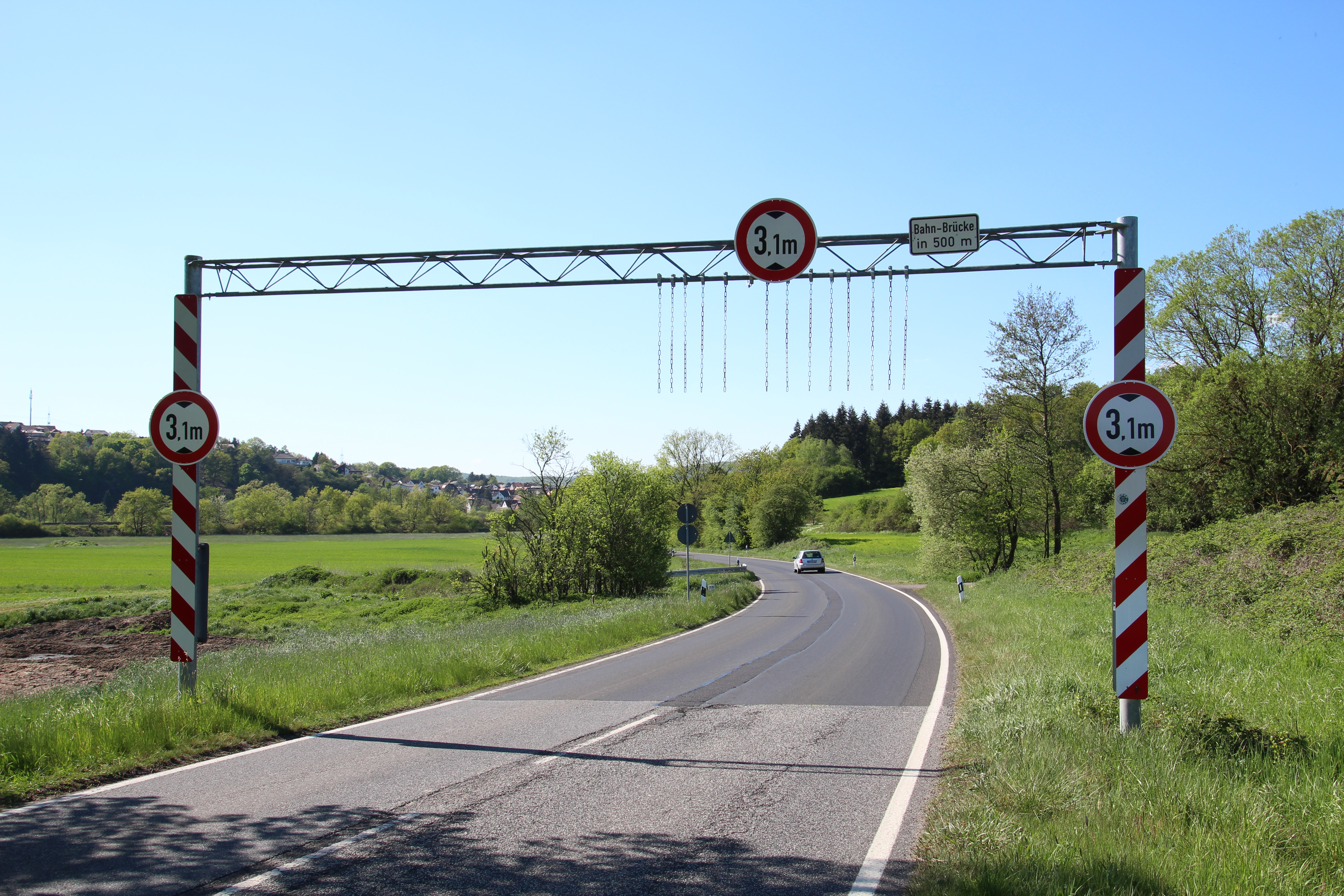
Tattle tales to warn of an approaching low bridge

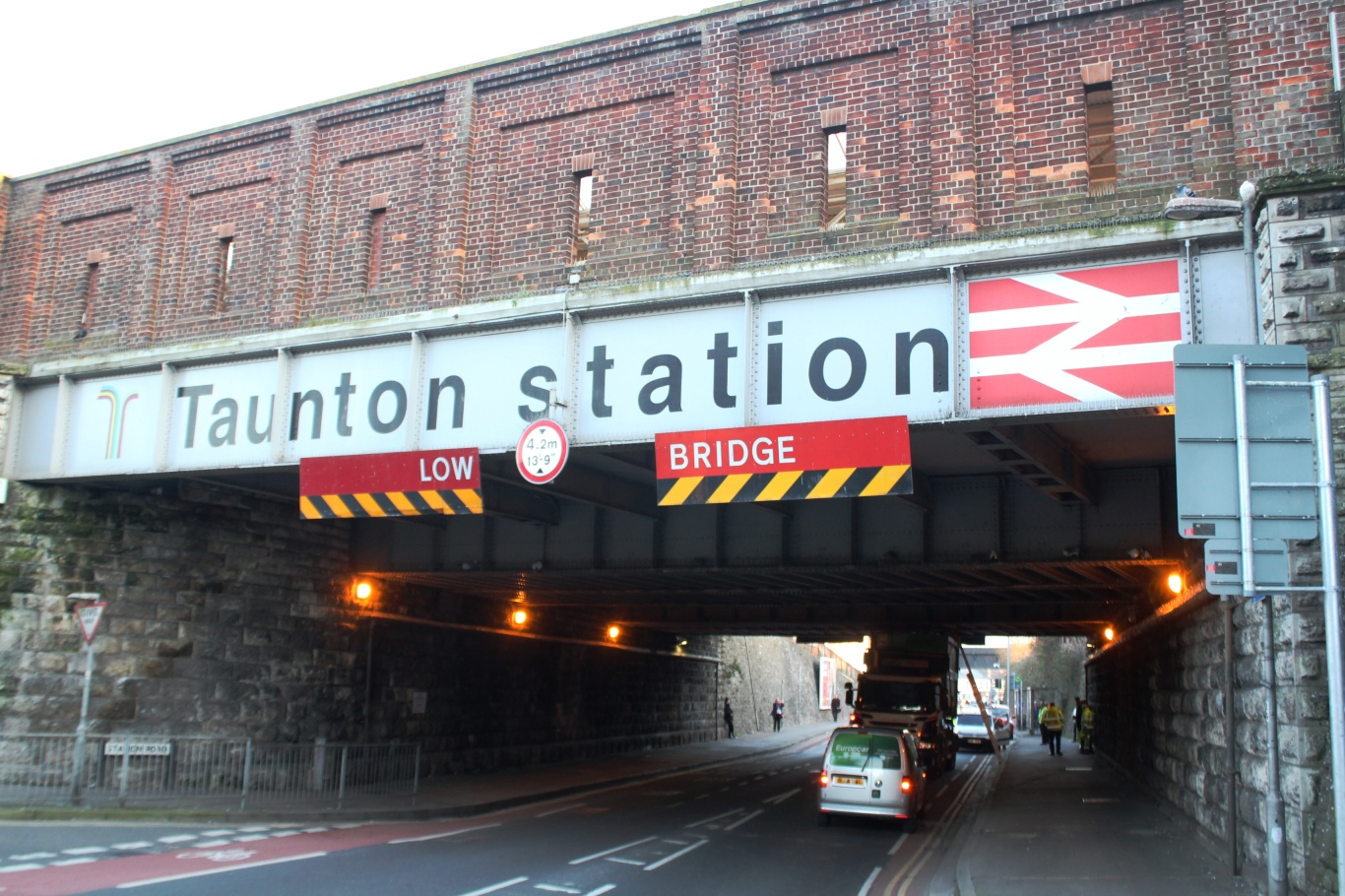
False soffit to match the lower clearance ahead

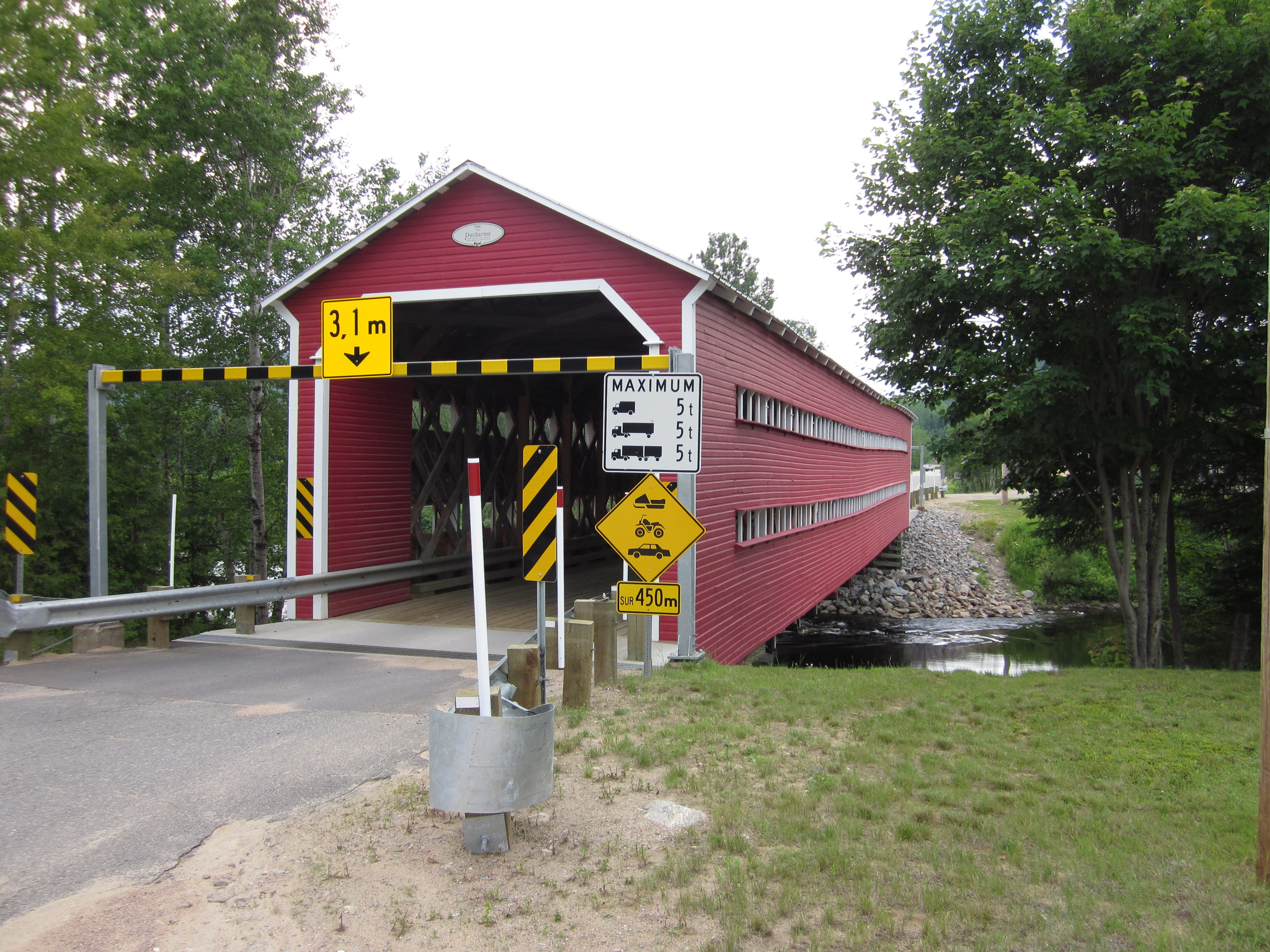
Height restriction bar in front of this covered bridge

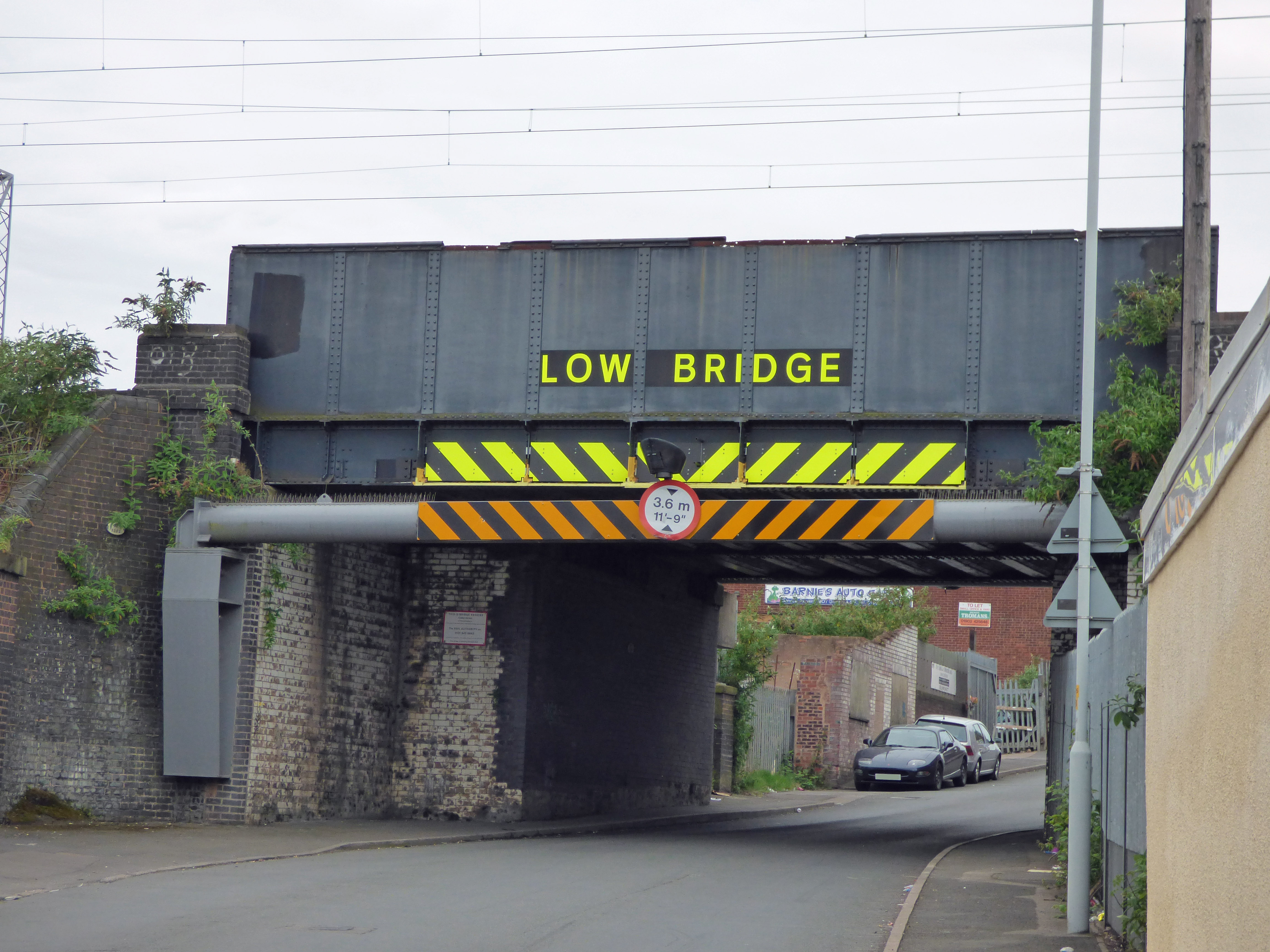
Collision prevention beam installed in front of this bridge

=== Overheight vehicle detection systems ===
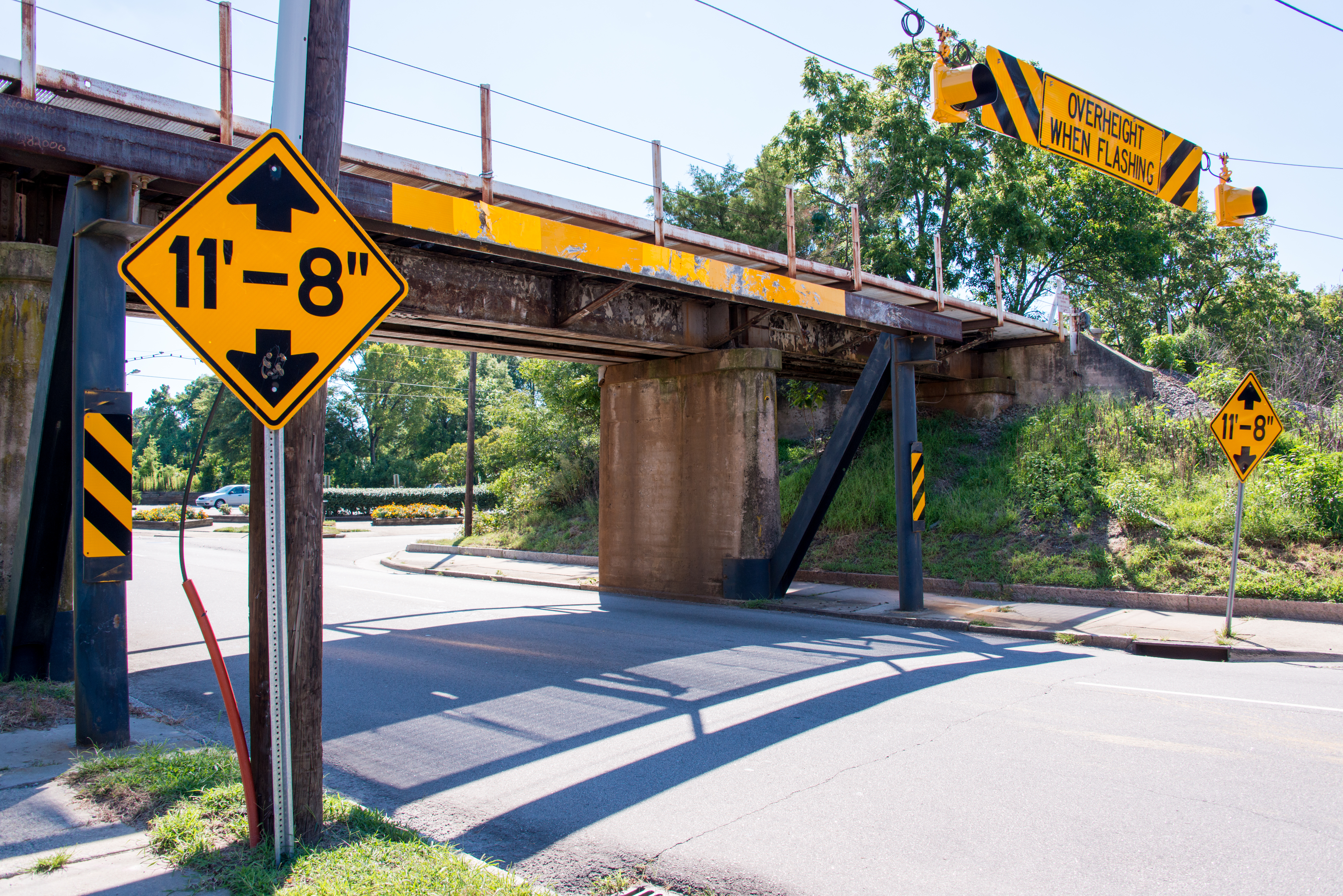
Warning sign with yellow flashing lights can be triggered by an overheight vehicle detection.

Overheight detectors integrated with flashing lights and other warning signs are used to in some locations to provide an active warning to the drivers of the vehicles that are over the height restrictions of the upcoming bridges or tunnels. Despite the yellow flashing lights, this method may still fail to gain attention of the drivers. The infamous Norfolk Southern–Gregson Street Overpass (also known as the 11-foot-8 Bridge) had 100 crashes on record between 2008 and 2016 even with this type of systems. An improvement to this is to have the detectors fully integrated with traffic lights to stop all traffic when an overheight vehicle is detected.

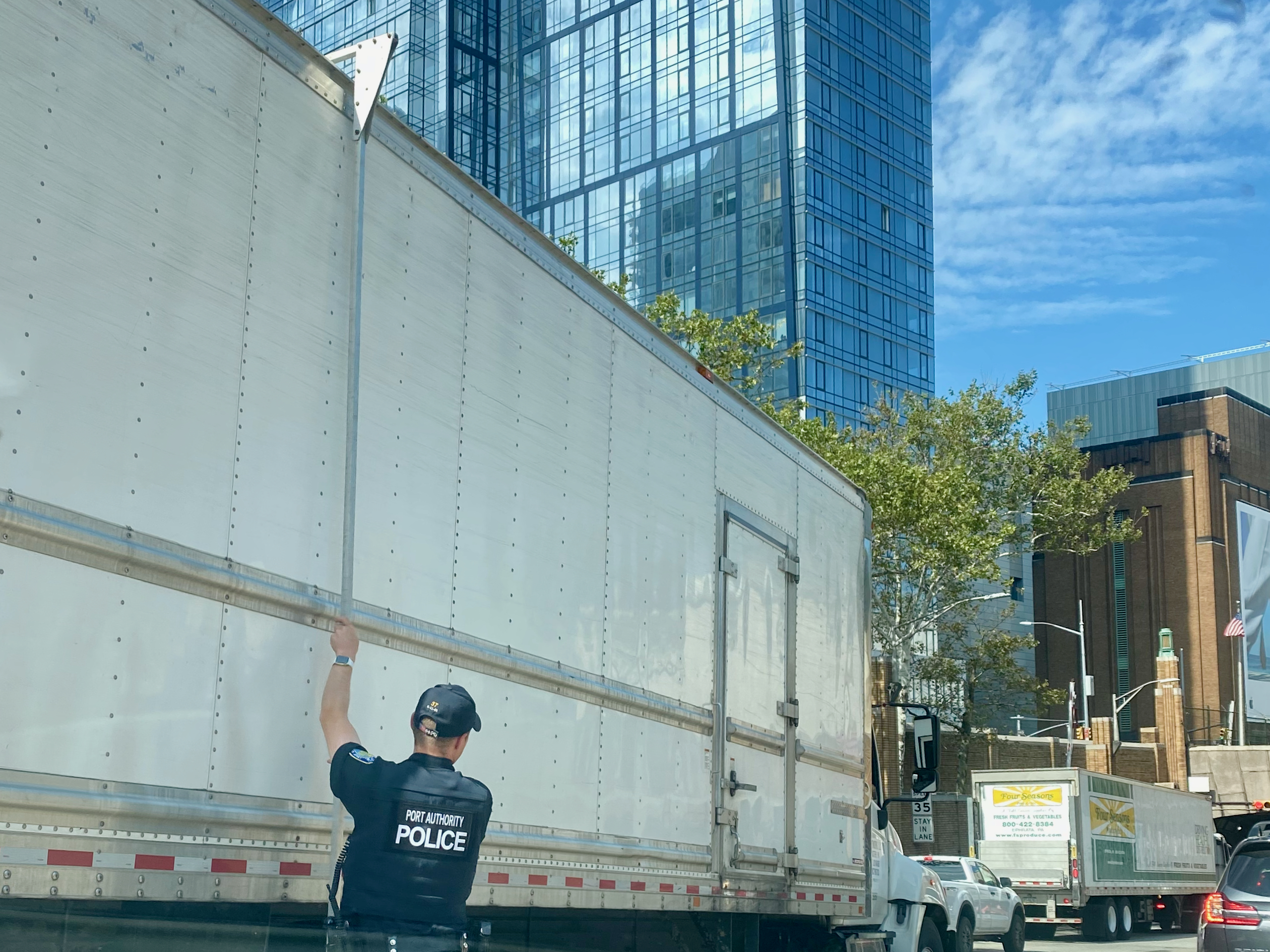
Police officer measures truck's height after the red traffic light is triggered to stop all traffic.

Fully integrated systems of overheight detectors and traffic lights have been used in tunnel operations for decades. By the 1970s, several tunnels in the United States had such systems in place. An example was a systems at the Hampton Roads Bridge–Tunnel which had two detection points. The first point provided an audible and visual warnings to drivers to pull over to an inspection station. The vehicle would be measured by an authority before allowing to proceed. In an event that an overheight vehicle failed to stop at the inspection station, the secondary detector would trigger another alarm that would display a message at variable-message signs to lower the speed limit and eventually turned the red light to stop all traffic. Most detectors in the 70s used photocell system with light source installed on one pole and a photocell detector installed on opposite side of the roadway. A major drawback of the photocell detectors was that they produced a lot of false alarms caused by snow and heavy rain. Another type of detectors at the time included trip wires that would be broken if an object at that height hit the wire.

Modern detectors now use other technologies such as red/infrared photoelectric sensors, infrared laser beams, and ultrasonic transducer. Some are dual-beam systems to increase reliability by allowing the system to function even with single beam, and to lower false alarms by rejecting birds and other materials. More sophisticated systems include camera systems that can capture 3D profiles of vehicles in realtime, and microwave radar systems that can capture vehicle height profiles. Contact-based detection systems are also in use such as low-clearance detection bars that are movable vertically to initiate a trigger.

In case of overheight vehicle detection systems that are fully integrated with traffic light control systems but unmanned, there is no personnel available to perform measurements and direct overheight vehicles away from the bridges. The lights will turn green after a short stop with an expectation that the drivers will notice the height restrictions and use an alternative route by themselves. Some drivers still do not think that the warnings are applicable to them and proceed to crash into the bridges after the lights turn to green.

In United Kingdom, a more advanced system that targets a specific vehicle was deployed at Blackwall Tunnel. An advanced overheight detection system is installed 1.6-kilometre (0.99 mi) ahead of the tunnel. It is equipped with automatic number-plate recognition that reads off the plate number and sends that over to variable-message signs to instruct the vehicle with that particular plate number to divert to the provided alternative route. The system reduced tunnel strikes by 38%. In Australia, a water curtain falling on all traffic lanes with a laser projection of a large stop sign in front of the Sydney Harbour Tunnel is used as the last resort to stop overheight vehicles that ignore all the warning signs and traffic lights.

=== Onboard systems ===
There are several systems that can be equipped in trucks or other commercial vehicles to provide bridge strike prevention. These include specialized truck GPS systems that have clearance information, systems that measure the actual vehicle heights, and onboard sensors that detect upcoming low-clearance structure. More advanced onboard systems can electronically receive warnings from overheight vehicle detection systems. They can apply a brake if drivers fail to react.

== Bridges known for strikes ==
A 2.7 m (8 ft 10 1/4 in) high overpass bridge near St Petersburg, Russia, is known as the "Bridge of Stupidity" because it is often struck by vehicles despite many warning signs. In May 2018, after it was struck for the 150th time by a GAZelle truck, a birthday cake was presented to the bridge. This made national news.

Similarly, the 11 ft 8 in (3.56 m) Norfolk Southern–Gregson Street Overpass, nicknamed "The Can Opener", in Durham, North Carolina, US, was very frequently struck by vehicles, and received international media attention until it was raised in 2019.

Infrared sensors, which trigger warning signs when a high vehicle approaches, were added to an underpass in Frauenfeld, Switzerland, only after several incidents.

A similar situation exists at an underpass on Guy Street in Montreal, which has a clearance of 3.75 m (12 ft 4 in).

== Waterways ==
In waterways, the term bridge strike may be used when a water vessel collides with a bridge. This may include a collision to the bridge span or a collision to the bridge support structure such as a pier. Bridge protection systems are used to mitigate the effects of a ship strike.

In 2014, the United States Coast Guard published statistics that it investigated 205 bridge strikes in the eleven years prior to the publication. All of those collisions involved a fixed, swing, lift or draw bridge. That number was 1.2% of all vessel collision incidents investigated by the Coast Guard. The primary causal factor was the lack of accurate air draft data, the distance between water surface to the top most part of the vessel.

== Aviation ==
Low-flying aircraft can also collide with bridges. For example, Air Florida Flight 90 crashed into a bridge over the Potomac River just after takeoff.

To prevent controlled flight into terrain, tall bridges may bear aviation obstruction lighting that notifies pilots of their presence.

== See also ==
- Clearance (civil engineering)
- Structure gauge

== Sources ==
- Knott, Michael; Prucz, Zolan (2000). "Vessel Collison Design of Bridges". Bridge Engineering Handbook (PDF). Boca Raton: CRC Press.
