= Bayswater (disambiguation) =

Bayswater is an area of west London, England.

Bayswater may refer also to:

== Places ==
=== Australia ===
- Bayswater, Victoria, a suburb of Melbourne
  - Bayswater railway station, Melbourne
- Electoral district of Bayswater, an electoral district in Victoria
- Bayswater Power Station, New South Wales
- City of Bayswater, a local government area near Perth
  - Bayswater, Western Australia a suburb of Perth
    - Bayswater railway station, Perth
- Electoral district of Bayswater (Western Australia), a former electorate of the Western Australian Legislative Assembly

=== United Kingdom ===
- Bayswater Road, a road in London
- Bayswater (ward)
- Bayswater tube station, a London underground station

=== Elsewhere ===
- Bayswater, Bloemfontein, a suburb of Bloemfontein, South Africa
- Bayswater, New Zealand, a suburb of North Shore City
- Bayswater, Nova Scotia, on the Aspotogan Peninsula, Canada
- Bayswater, Queens, a neighborhood of New York City, US

== Organisations ==
- Bayswater Car Rental
