= Garratt Road Bridge =

Two bridges in Perth, Western Australia

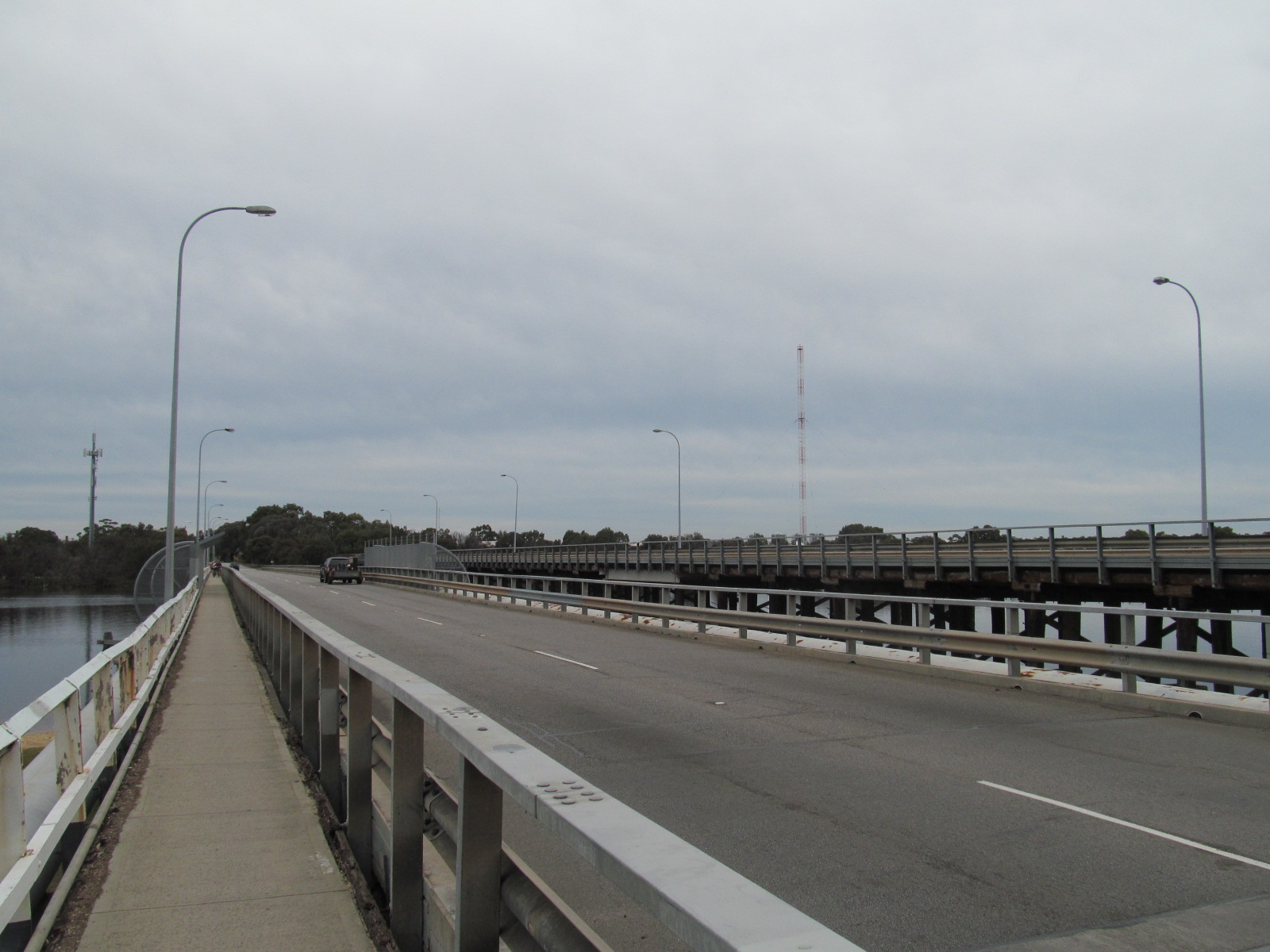
- View along upstream bridge from north-west
- Coordinates: 31°55′57″S 115°54′59″E
- Crosses: Swan River
- Locale: Bayswater–Ascot
- Owner: Main Roads Western Australia
- Structure number: 950 (upstream); 952 (downstream)

Characteristics
- Material: Timber
- Total length: 237 m (778 ft)
- Width: 8.7 m (29 ft)
- Longest span: 12.1 m (40 ft)
- No. of spans: 38
- Piers in water: 37

History
- Designer: Ernest Godfrey
- Constructed by: Main Roads Department

Statistics

Western Australia Heritage Register
- Type: State Registered Place
- Designated: 23 March 2010
- Reference no.: 11342

Location
- Interactive map of Garratt Road Bridge

Garratt Road Bridge consists of two adjacent bridges over the Swan River, linking the suburbs of Bayswater and Ascot in Perth, Western Australia. The upstream bridge was built in 1935, while the matching downstream bridge was built in 1972. The site was significant prior to the construction of Garratt Road Bridge – it featured in Aboriginal mythology, and was in the near vicinity of 1880s bridges for pedestrians and trains accessing Ascot Racecourse. From that time there were various proposal to provide a vehicular crossing between Bayswater and Bassendean. Interest peaked in 1928, but plans were delayed due to the Great Depression. The first bridge, designed by Main Roads Chief Engineer Ernest Godfrey, was constructed in 1934–35. It allowed two lanes of traffic to cross the Swan River, alongside pedestrians on an adjacent footbridge.

Increasing traffic volume led to the bridge being widened by one and a half metres (5 ft) in 1962. By the end of that decade, a second bridge was being planned to cope with rising levels of congestion. It was constructed during 1971–72, but with only a 40-year design life as it was expected to be redundant once the planned Beechboro–Gosnells Highway (modern-day Tonkin Highway) opened. From the 1970s, Main Roads has maintained the bridges with procedures that vastly extended the bridges' lifespans, including concrete overlays on the decks, and retrofitting of steel girders. The heritage value of the structure was recognised in 1998, and Garratt Road Bridge was included in the City of Bayswater's Municipal Heritage Inventory. Eleven years later, in 2009, it was added to the state heritage list, and a permanent entry was given on 23 March 2010.

== Description ==
Garratt Road Bridge consists of a pair of bridges across the Swan River, between Bayswater and Ascot. The upstream bridge, from 1935, carries southbound traffic, pedestrians, and two pipes, while northbound traffic travels on the 1970 downstream bridge. Both bridges are predominantly constructed from timber, and feature "timber piles driven into the river bed linked with timber cross bracing and double beams top and bottom and then spanned by timber logs which in turn support the wooden decking". The original bridge is at a lower height, and some of its beams have been replaced by Rolled Steel Joists. While both bridges have modern steel safety rails, the original white-painted wooden rail is still present along the pedestrian path. The original bridge has approximately 38 spans over 37 piers, along a 238-metre (781 ft) length.

Main Roads Western Australia maintains and controls Garratt Road Bridge. The road is designated Highway H37, while the bridges are designated Structure Number 950 (upstream) and Structure Number 952 (downstream). The original bridge has 38 spans over a length of 236.4 metres (776 ft), a width of 8.75 metres (28.7 ft), and a deck area of 2,068.50 square metres (22,265.1 sq ft). The road width is 8.35 metres (27.4 ft), while the footpath width is 1.3 metres (4 ft 3 in). The newer bridge has similar measurements: 38 spans over a length of 237.7 metres (780 ft), width of 8.65 metres (28.4 ft), deck area of 2,056.11 square metres (22,131.8 sq ft), and road width of 8.21 metres (26.9 ft). The longest spans of each bridges are 12.1 metres (40 ft) in length.

Garratt Road Bridge is the longest timber bridge still in existence in Western Australia. It may have been the longest ever built in the state, (Note: According to its permanent entry on the State Register of Heritage Places) and the downstream bridge was probably the last wooden bridge to be built in Perth. (Note: According to a Channel 7 documentary)

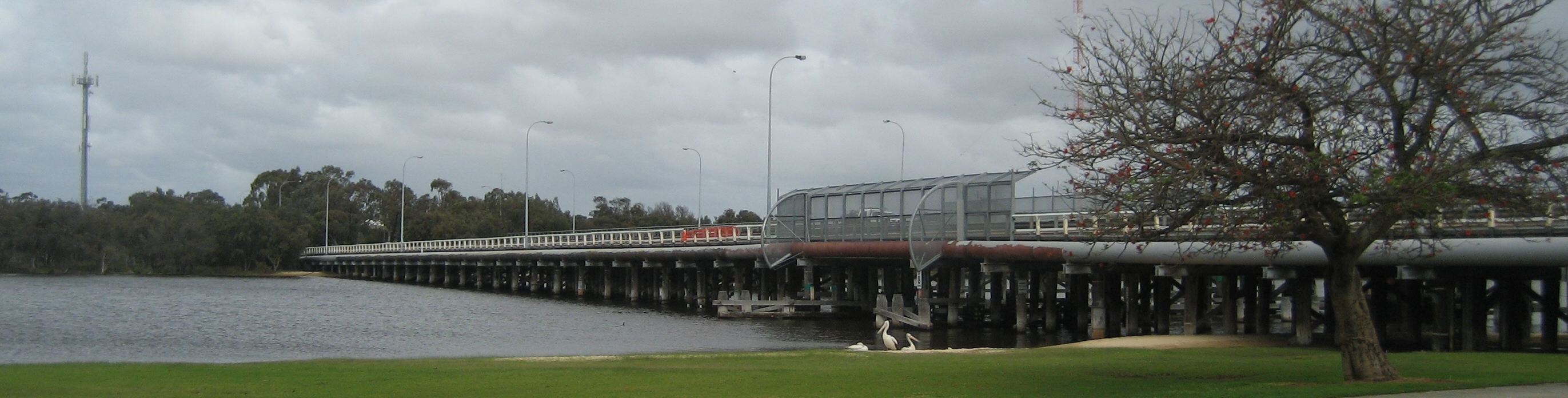
View of the upstream Garratt Road Bridge in 2009

== History ==
=== Background ===
Before European colonisation, the area around the Garratt Road Bridge site was inhabited by the Mooro people to the north of the Swan River, and the Beeloo people to the south. Beeloo territory included the Martagarup (Note: meaning leg deep) flats, immediately south-west of the bridge site, which served as a traditional fishing group and features prominently in Indigenous mythology. According to Noongar belief, the Swan River was carved by the meandering Wagyl, a snakelike being from Dreamtime, and that scales shed from the male Wagyl remain visible in the riverbank at Ascot.

Following the establishment of the Swan River Colony in 1829, European settlers James Birkett and James Henty received 1,000 acres (400 ha) blocks containing the modern-day bridge site. Birkett's land was north of the river, and following his death it was sold to James Drummond in 1839. Henty's land was south of the river, and changed hands multiple times in a short timespan – Henty preferred the north side of the river, and so sold his block to Philip Dod, who disliked the marsh-like quality of the land, and traded it to John Wall Hardey, founder of the Wesley Church in Perth. Hardey expanded his land, which he named Grove Farm, by buying neighbouring riverside lots.

Hardey was influential in the development of the Belmont area, as he took on the roles of Justice of the Peace, magistrate and member of the Legislative Council. Harvey lobbied for river crossings to be constructed in 1837; The Causeway was built in 1843, and a crossing over the Helena River soon followed. Horse racing began on Grove Farm in 1848, and roads were constructed using convict labour to improve access from the road to Guildford (modern-day Great Eastern Highway). In 1850 the races moved to the current site of Ascot Racecourse. With the advent of horse training facilities in 1856, a horse pulley system was set up to provide a river crossing – close to the modern-day Garratt Bridge site, but east of the racecourse. Bridges were constructed in the 1880s to improve access to the races – a mechanical drawbridge for pedestrians opened in 1881, and a railway bridge was built in 1885. The bridge, later known as the Belmont railway bridge, (Note: the third railway crossing of the Swan River to be constructed, after the earlier Fremantle and Guildford bridges) carried a spur of the Perth–Guildford line that terminated south of the racecourse, but only operated on racing days.

=== Proposals ===
There has been proposals for a vehicle bridge since the late 1880s; it was one of the most advocated issues in the Bayswater area. The first formal request to the Perth Road Board for a vehicular crossing between Bayswater and Belmont was made in 1904, but it was declined due to insufficient trade potential. The Belmont and Bayswater Road Boards (Note: Bayswater rather than Perth, as the boundary between the road boards was changed to Caledonian Avenue in 1906; the formation of the Bayswater Road Board in 1897 had not changed the boundary of the Perth Road Board) requested the state government construct a bridge, as new industries were developing in the districts. The government, however, considered there were more urgent matters than the bridge, which was estimated to cost £A 6,000, equivalent to A$1.1 million in 2022.

In 1922 the idea of a bridge was suggested again, this time as part of a circular tram line. Belmont Park and Bayswater Road Boards made a deputation to the state government on 23 February 1923, but again received an unenthusiastic response on 13 April, stating that the £9,100 was not available and could not be justified. Following a public meeting in 1924, residents of Bayswater and Belmont made a direct appeal to the premier, asserting that a new bridge would reduce traffic over The Causeway, and save the cost of replacing the structure, said to be £200,000. A government survey was conducted, and three estimates were obtained – which put the cost at £35,000 to £38,000 – but no funding was provided.

Renewed interest in the proposed bridge came from the newly formed Town Planning Commission in 1928. Three potential sites were considered: The Town Planning Commission advocated for a bridge to the east of Ascot Racecourse, connecting to Slade Street north of the river. The Bayswater Road Board also preferred an eastern option, connecting to Epsom Avenue south of the river, while the Belmont Park Road Board recommended the crossing be further west, at Abernethy Road. The third option was at Garratt Road, midway between the eastern and western options, and was the government's final decision. Plans did not progress due to the onset of the Great Depression.

=== Construction ===
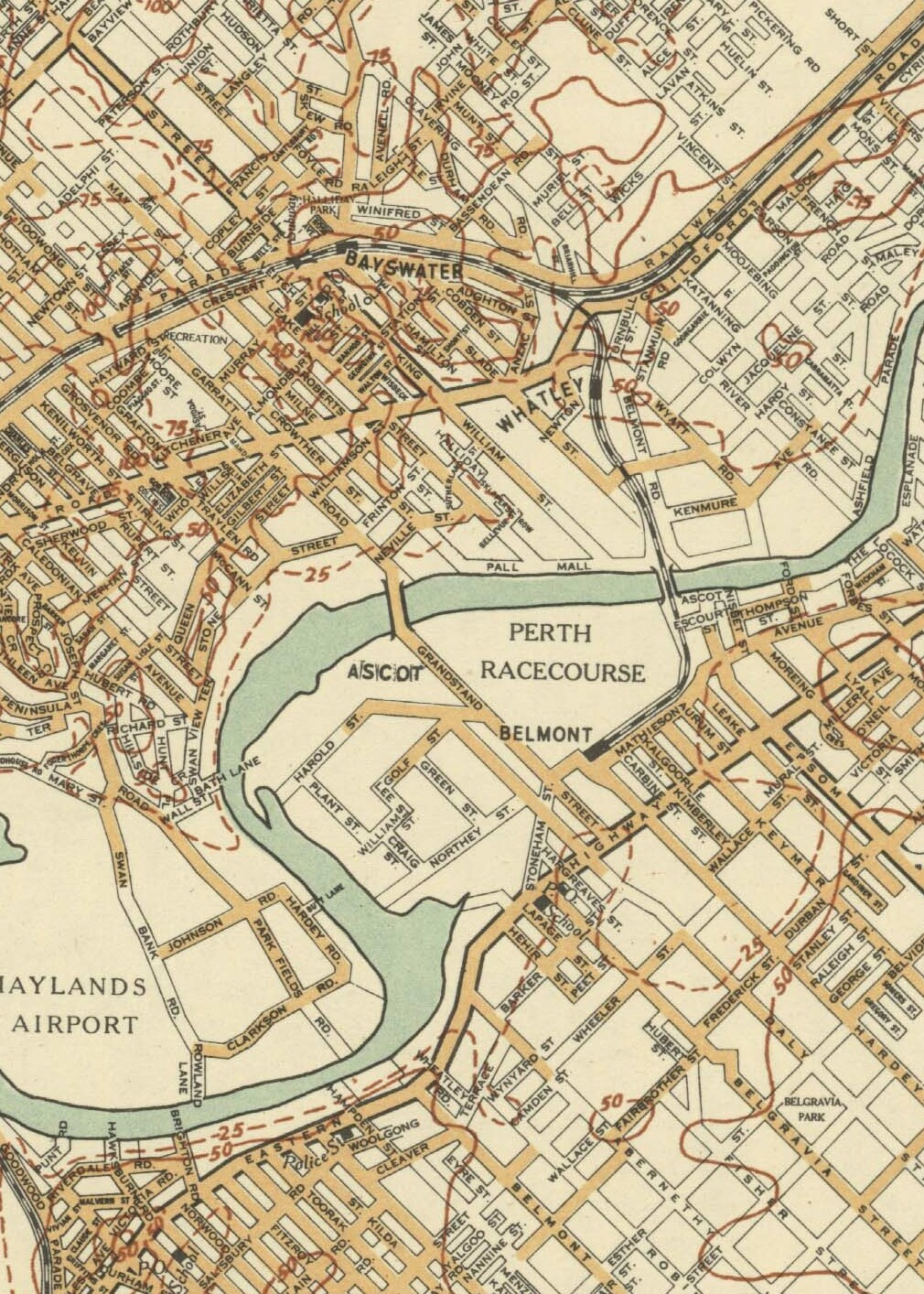
Map of Bayswater, Ascot and surrounds in 1945, showing Garratt Road Bridge and the railway bridge to the east on either side of Ascot Racecourse

Planning for a bridge recommenced in 1933, with construction beginning the following year. Main Roads Chief Engineer Ernest Godfrey designed the bridge. Godfrey was the first bridge engineer for Main Roads, and oversaw the design of all of Main Roads' bridges statewide between 1928 and 1957. The bridge was designed and constructed economically, out of low cost local wood – Wandoo, Jarrah and Karri – and without treatments such as beam shaping that would have added unnecessary cost. Fill material came from levelling Ascot Racecourse, which had contained a World War I era mound in its centre. The mound had initially been used by soldiers during training, and later by children playing. Sustenance labourers worked on the construction project, which required homes and businesses to be demolished or repositioned. Garratt Road Bridge opened on 1 January 1935, the same day as the Perth Cup, having cost £35,000 for the bridge itself, and an additional £9,000 for the approaches, equivalent to $4.8 million in 2022 for both. Like the road it connects to, the bridge is named after Mary Anne Traylen (née Garratt). Her husband, William Traylen, named various roads in Bayswater after family members when he subdivided his land, c. 1890.

In 1956, fire wrecked the nearby Belmont railway bridge, which was then demolished. Buses became the main form of transportation across the river to Ascot Racecourse, but by that time Garratt Road Bridge was already congested due to increasing traffic. The bridge was widened in 1962 to cater for the increased volume in both ways, from 8.38 metres (27.5 ft) to 10 metres (33 ft). The works also allowed a 107-centimetre (42 in) diameter water main to be carried, on the bridges's western side.

The 1960s saw increasing traffic volume across Garratt Road Bridge. By the end of that decade, planning was under way for another bridge at the site to cater for the increasing demand. The new bridge was planned as a short-term solution, with only a forty-year design life, as it was expected to be unnecessary once the planned Beechboro–Gosnells Highway (modern-day Tonkin Highway) opened. The design of the second bridge mimicked the original bridge, especially in aesthetics and the span configuration. It was constructed downstream from the original, to carry northbound traffic. Works began in 1971, and the bridge opened on 4 July 1972. A new road, Resolution Drive, was constructed in 1972 to tie into the new bridge. It carried northbound traffic as part of a one-way pairing with Grandstand Road, which then only carried the southbound traffic. By 2007 the one-way pair was removed, traffic was diverted wholly to the now dual carriageway Grandstand Road, and Resolution Drive was reverted to a residential street.

=== Maintenance and upgrades ===
From the 1970s, Main Roads applied newly developed maintenance procedures that vastly extended the bridges' lifespans. Such methods included "concrete decks; concrete pile and abutment overlays; removal of decayed timber and replacement with structural epoxy filler; sealing endgrain decking and tops of wingwall piles; diffusible fungicides; clearance of undergrowth to decrease surrounding humidity; skilled inspections, and treatment of metal components". Concrete decks were added to the upstream and downstream bridges in 1972 and 1980 respectively, to minimise rot, control termites, and distribute loads on the bridge more evenly. Steel girders were also retrofitted, replacing wooden half-caps. Karri used for half-caps was particularly prone to termite attack; while the outside had been treated with sodium fluoride and arsenic trioxide, the inside was susceptible to being hollowed out, and was the cause of a partial collapse of the upstream bridge in 1987.

Steel barricades were added to the upstream bridge in 2000, to prevent swimmers jumping from the bridge into the paths of ferries. In 2005 wooden half-caps supporting the water pipeline were removed, and replaced with steel. The following year, new approach slabs were installed, and new expansion joints were added to the existing concrete, to reduce the increased stress that increased traffic volumes were causing. Bridge works were undertaken again from 12 December 2014, with an expected completion date of 1 April 2015. The downstream road, then the upstream road were resurfaced in 2017, which included the installation of new steel safety barriers, and the reinforcement or replacement of the wooden pylons supporting the bridges with concrete pilings.

=== Heritage listing ===
The City of Bayswater included Garratt Road Bridge on its Municipal Heritage Inventory on 24 February 1998, and it received classification from the National Trust on 14 April 1998. In 1998, Main Roads Western Australia undertook a survey of the state's bridges, and confirmed the heritage value of the upstream Garratt Road Bridge. It was added to the state heritage list in Autumn 2009, and on 23 March 2010 received a permanent entry in the Register of Heritage Places.

== See also ==
- Avon Descent – Garratt Road Bridge is the end point
