= Belmont railway line, Western Australia =

Former railway line in Perth, Western Australia

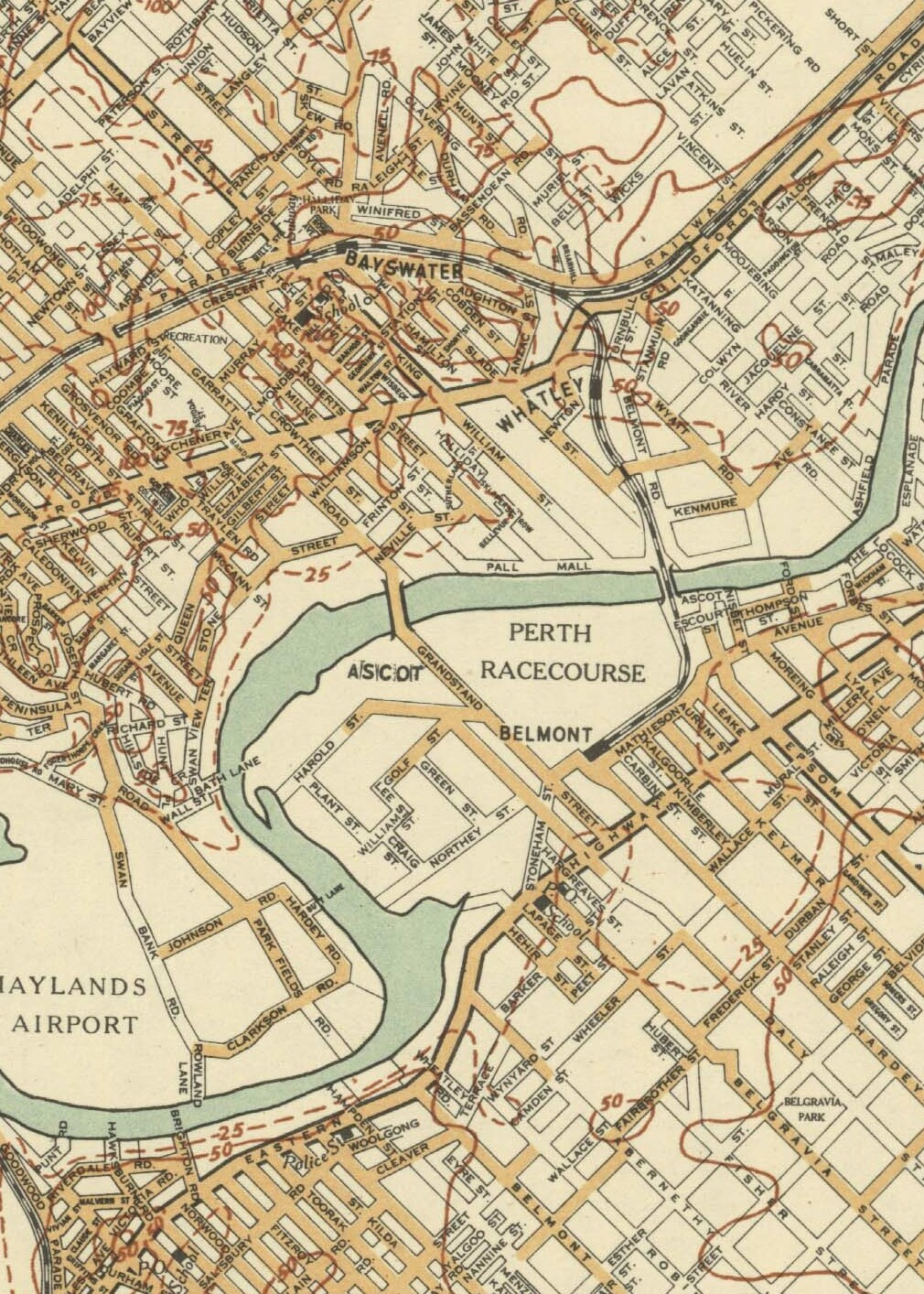
Excerpt from a 1945 Perth street map showing the Belmont line and surrounds

The Belmont Railway Line was a branch railway in Western Australia that extended from the Eastern Railway at Bayswater to cross the Swan River to Belmont near the Ascot Racecourse. The line closed in 1956.

The line was also known as the Belmont Spur line, Belmont Branch, and Perth Racecourse Railway.

== History ==
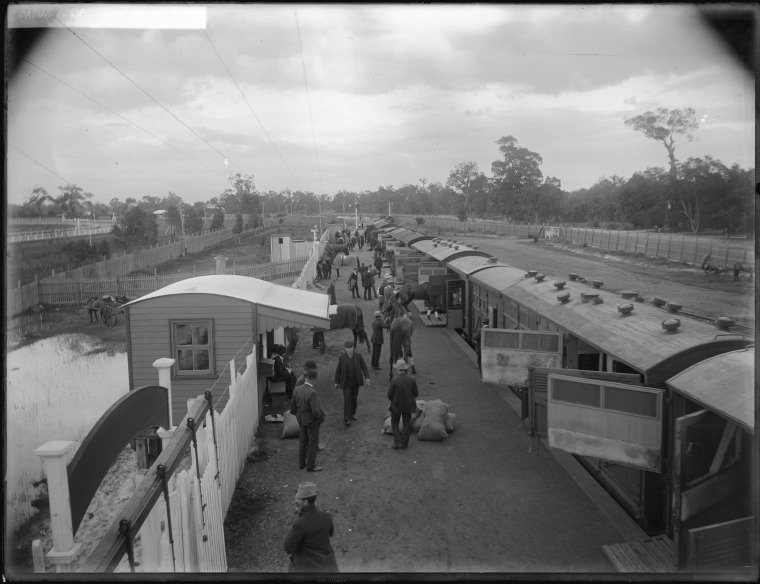
Horses being loaded at Belmont station, 1912

In November 1885 a 65 chains (1.3 km) branch line was constructed from the Eastern Railway at Bayswater across the Swan River to the Perth Race Course, improving access to the Race Course. Initially a ferry service across the Swan River was provided for racegoers travelling to and from the Race Course by train, which was replaced by a narrow footbridge by 1891.

The branch line's construction immediately spawned proposals to construct a railway linking the Eastern Railway at Bayswater (via the branch line) to areas south of Perth, including Canning, Kelmscott, Woongong, Pinjarra, Bunbury, and Busselton. The various proposals were abandoned following the announcement of the construction of the South Western Railway in 1891 which provided a more direct route bridging the Swan River further to the south.

The Perth Racecourse Railway Act 1896, an act by the Parliament of Western Australia granted assent on 27 October 1896, authorised the construction of the railway line from Bayswater.

In 1897 the line was extended across the Swan River, and a new station built on the southern side of the Race Course. The new station was opened on 21 October 1897. The railway service to Belmont was suspended in 1926 following floods.

Consideration of closing the railway had been publicly discussed as early as 1930. There was a proposal to convert the rail bridge over the Swan River to a road bridge, however this never happened. Instead, the Garratt Road Bridge opened nearby in 1935.

In the mid-1930s, the Bayswater Road Board asked the Main Roads Department to construct a subway at Guildford Road to replace the existing level crossing. The Bayswater Road Board considered the level crossing, named Whatley Crossing to be one of the most dangerous level crossings in the area. The subway was never constructed.

The Belmont branch line was closed in 1956 following a fire on the bridge crossing the Swan River, and the bridge, line and stations were removed in 1957. The Belmont Branch Railway Discontinuance and Land Revestment Act 1956, assented to on 7 December 1956, authorised the closure of the line.
