= Bert Wright Park =

Park in Perth, Western Australia

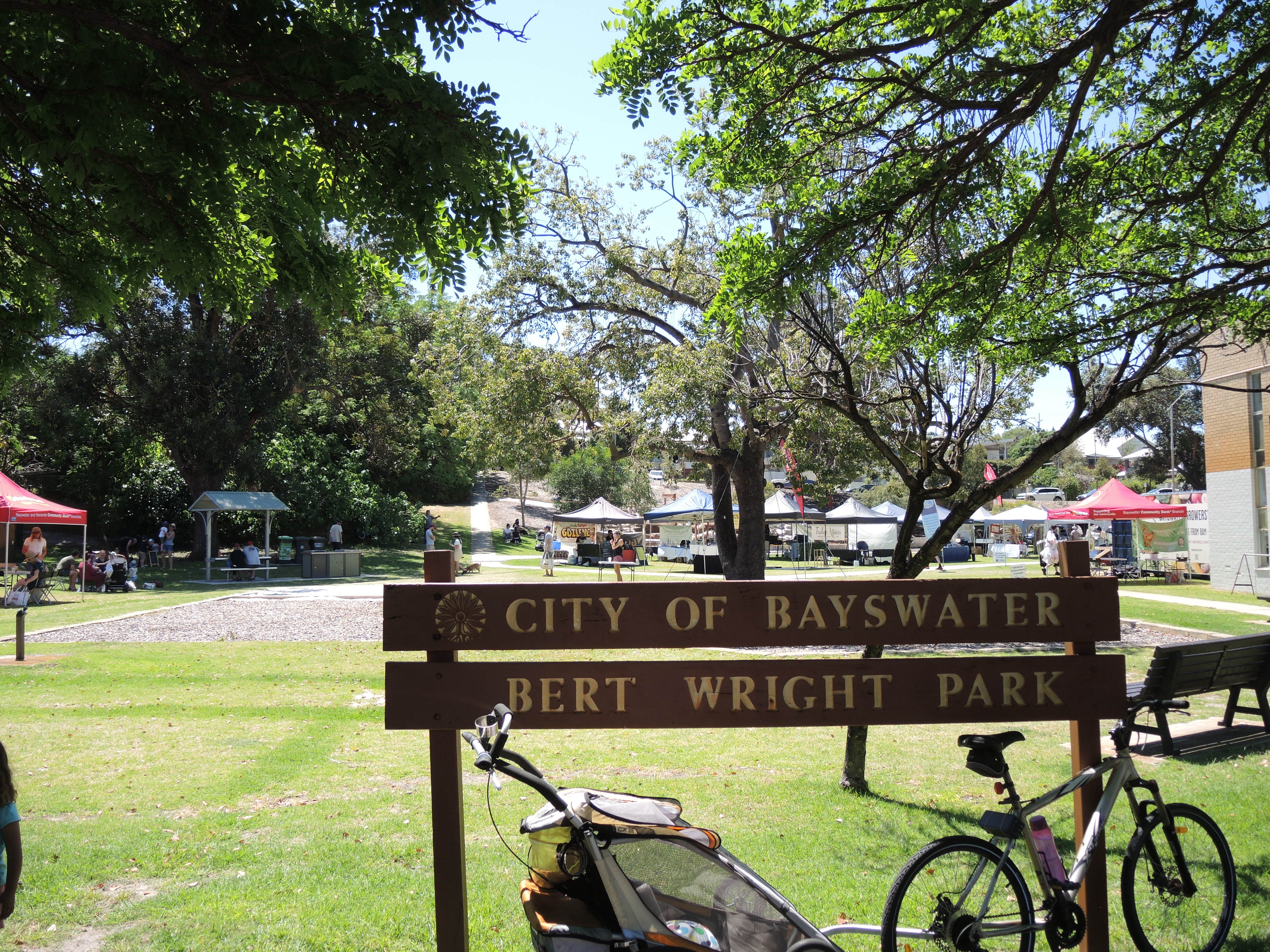
- Bayswater Growers' Market at Bert Wright Park
- Interactive map of Bert Wright Park
- Type: Urban
- Location: Bayswater, Western Australia
- Coordinates: 31.9198°S 115.9139°E

Bert Wright Park is a park in Bayswater, Western Australia, a suburb of Perth. It is situated in the Bayswater town centre, next to Bayswater Library on King William Street. Facilities include a nature-based playground, toilets and barbeques.

== History ==
In the late 1920s, the Bayswater Road Board (now City of Bayswater) started to improve the amenity of the area, and one of the things they did was to resume a property in the town centre from a private landowner for use as a public space. The property was a market garden at the time. Robert McLeish, a prominent resident of Bayswater, led the campaign for resuming the land to be used for public purposes. The land was chosen as it was considered undesirable for a market garden to be on the main street of Bayswater. The park was initially named Whatley Gardens, after John and Anne Whatley, early residents of the area, but the park was later renamed Bert Wright Reserve, after a Shire of Bayswater councillor and business owner.

In the 1960s, a senior citizens centre and a library were built. These two buildings were later combined into one building.

In 2016, a new playground was built at a cost of $100,000, and the old one removed.

Since September 2019, the Bayswater Growers' Market has taken place every Saturday morning at Bert Wright Park. The market is organised by community group Future Bayswater and supported by the City of Bayswater.

=== Kurrajong tree ===
In January 2020, a kurrajong tree was relocated from next to Bayswater railway station to Bert Wright Park, due to it being in the way of a new station planned to be built there. The tree, which was 80 years old at the time, was deemed too significant to cut down, so it was instead relocated to Bert Wright Park, being planted where the previous playground was. The process started in May 2019, when arborists started trimming the tree's roots. The relocation took place on 9 January 2020, using one crane to lift the 17-tonne (37,000-pound) tree and another crane to move the tree 200 metres (660 ft) down King William Street to the park.

== Gallery ==
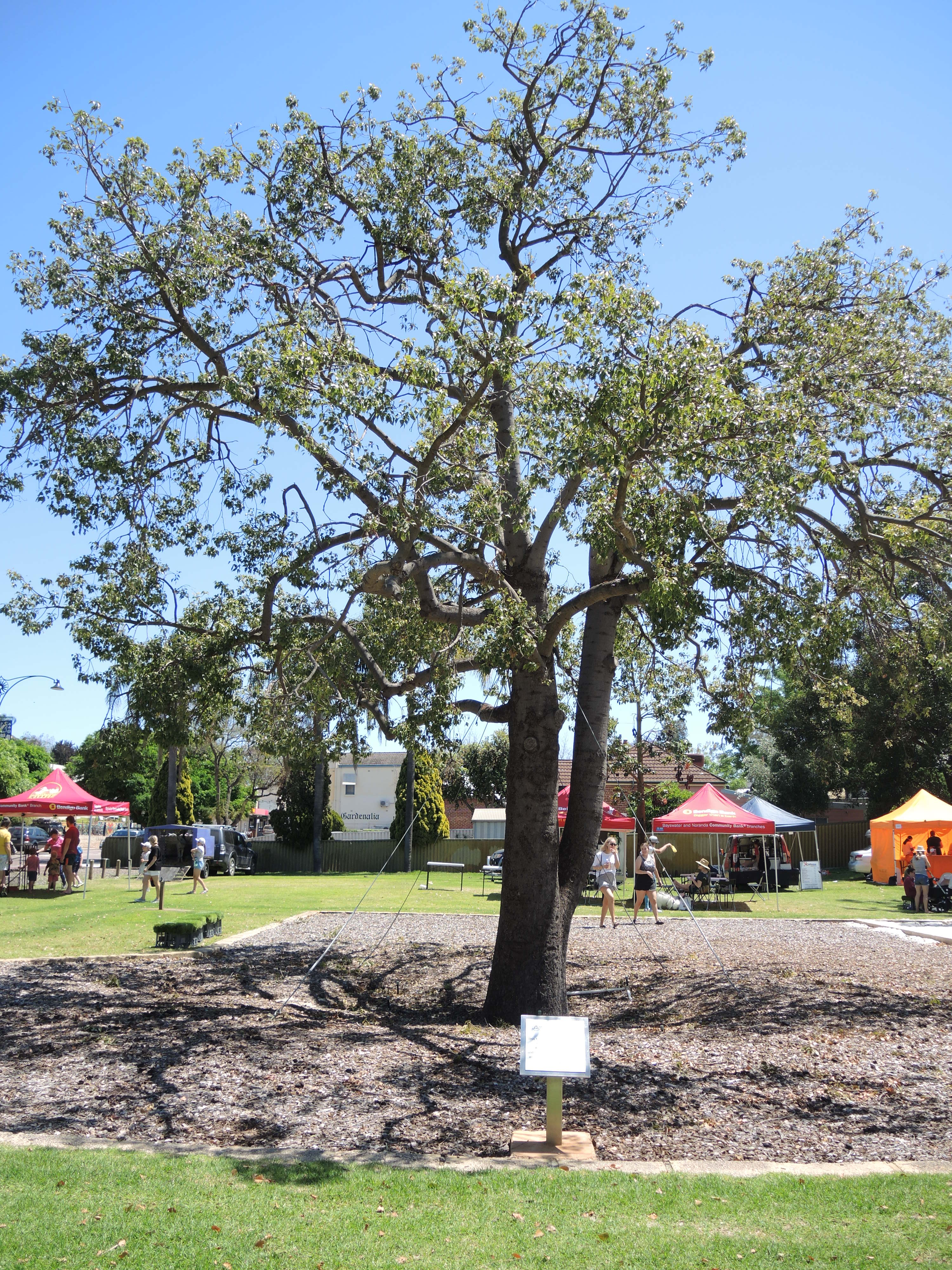
Kurrajong tree relocated to the park in January 2020

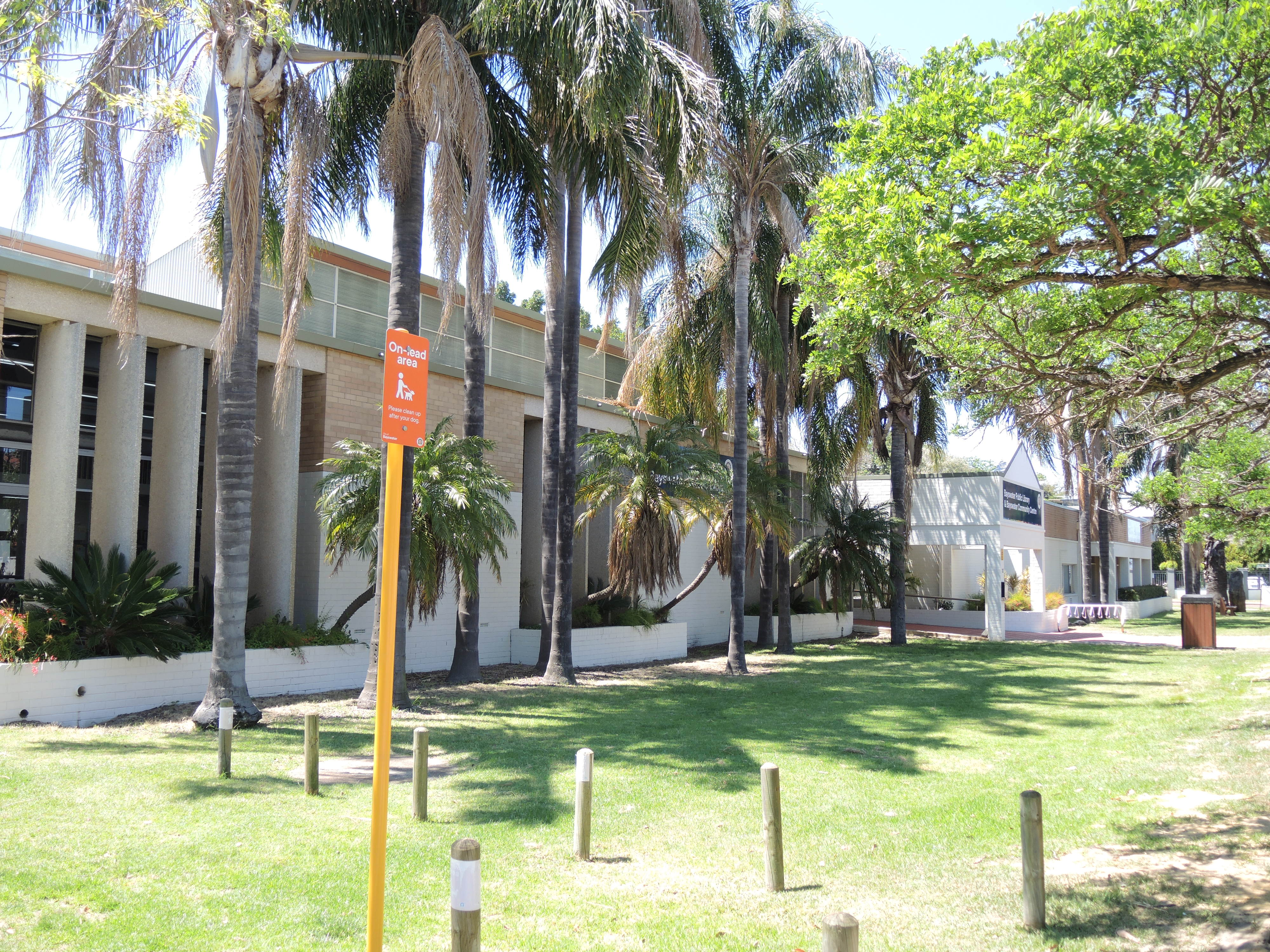
Bayswater Library, adjacent to Bert Wright Park
