= Bayswater, Bloemfontein =

Bayswater
- Location within Free State (South African province) Location within South Africa
- Coordinates: 29°4′57″S 26°14′25″E
- Country: South Africa
- Province: Free State
- Municipality: Mangaung
- Main Place: Bloemfontein

Area
  - Total: 3.26 km^{2} (1.26 sq mi)

Population (2011)
  - Total: 4,491
  - Density: 1,380/km^{2} (3,570/sq mi)

Racial makeup (2011)
  - Black African: 24.9%
  - Coloured: 4.0%
  - White: 68.9%
  - Other: 2.2%

First languages (2011)
  - Afrikaans: 65.3%
  - English: 19.9%
  - Sotho: 6.7%
  - Xhosa: 2.8%
  - Other: 5.3%
- Time zone: UTC+2 (SAST)
- Postal code (street): n/a
- PO box: 9301
- Area code: 051

Bayswater is a suburb of the city of Bloemfontein in South Africa.
