= Bayswater, Western Australia =

Bayswater
- Suburb
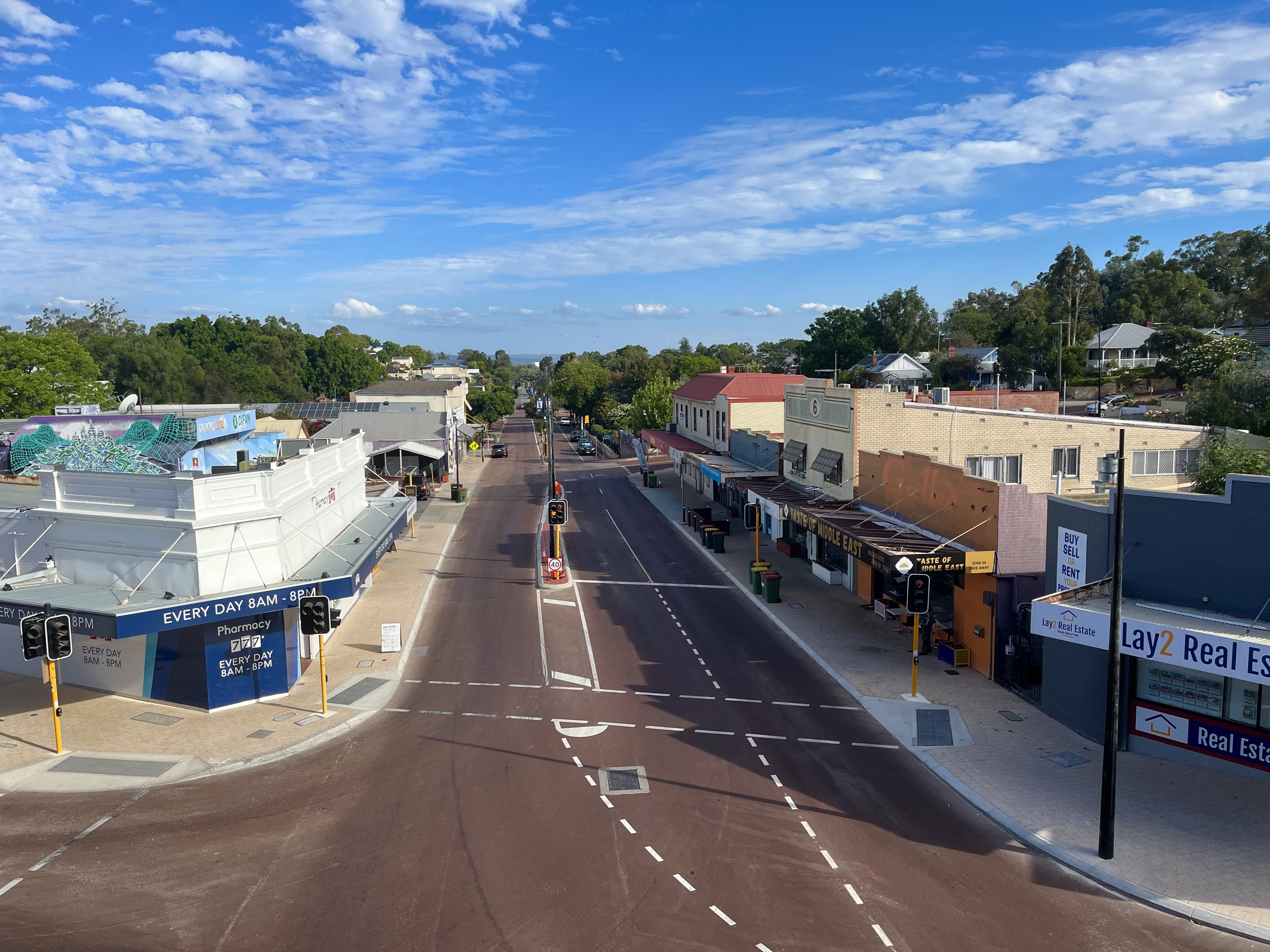
- View of King William Street south from the Bayswater station shared path in January 2024
- Interactive map of Bayswater
- Coordinates: 31°55′03″S 115°54′49″E
- Country: Australia
- State: Western Australia
- City: Perth
- LGA: City of Bayswater
- Location: 6 km (3.7 mi) from Perth
- Established: 1885

Government
  - State electorate: Maylands, Bassendean
  - Federal division: Perth

Area
  - Total: 9.83 km^{2} (3.80 sq mi)

Population
  - Total: 15,288 (SAL 2021)
- Postcode: 6053
Suburbs around Bayswater
Embleton	Morley	Eden Hill
Bedford	Bayswater	Bassendean
Maylands	Ascot	Ashfield

Bayswater is a riverside suburb 6 kilometres (4 mi) north-east of the central business district (CBD) of Perth, the capital of Western Australia. It is just north of the Swan River, within the City of Bayswater local government area. It is predominantly a low-density residential suburb consisting of single-family detached homes. However, there are several clusters of commercial buildings, most notably in the suburb's town centre, around the intersection of Whatley Crescent and King William Street and a light industrial area in the suburb's east.

Prior to European settlement, the Mooro group of the Whadjuk Noongar people inhabited the area. In 1830, the year after the European settlement of the Swan River Colony, land along the river was divided between the colonists, who moved in soon after. Most either died or left in the months following, leaving the area undeveloped for most of the 19th century. In 1881, the Fremantle–Guildford railway line was built, triggering the founding of the Bayswater Estate, the first development in the area, and in 1897, the Bayswater Road Board was founded, giving Bayswater its own local government. At first, development consisted of nurseries, market gardens and dairies, but as time went on, Bayswater became more and more suburban. Today, Bayswater is fully suburbanised, with the subdividing of older lots being commonplace. Plans for apartments around Bayswater and Meltham railway stations are a contentious issue.

Parks and wetlands in Bayswater include the Baigup Wetlands, the Eric Singleton Bird Sanctuary and Riverside Gardens. There are other parks throughout the suburb, including Bert Wright Park, Halliday Park (which includes a war memorial), Hillcrest Reserve and Houghton Park line Bayswater's Swan River foreshore. Major roads through the suburb include Guildford Road, which connects to the Perth CBD and Tonkin Highway.

== History ==
=== Before European colonisation ===
Prior to European settlement, the area was inhabited by the Mooro group of the Whadjuk Noongar people. They were led by Yellagonga and inhabited the area north of the Swan River, as far east as Ellen Brook and north to Moore River. The Swan River provided fresh water and food, as well as being a place for trade. A camping ground, at least 4,500 years old, existed just north of the present-day junction of Tonkin Highway and Guildford Road. Another camping ground likely existed in the area now known as the Baigup Wetlands.

=== European colonisation ===
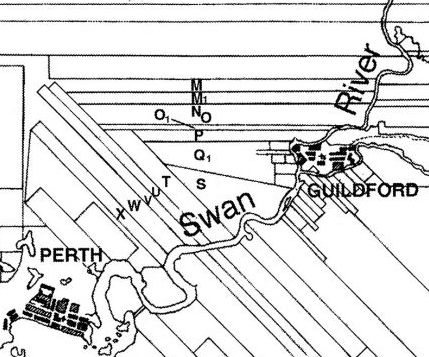
Ribbon grants near Swan River

When Europeans founded the Swan River Colony in 1829, they did not recognise the indigenous ownership of the land. John Septimus Roe, the colony's Surveyor General, surveyed the land along the Swan River. His survey resulted in the land being divided into long, narrow rectangular strips extending from the river. As the river was the only method of transportation in the colony's early years, each piece of land had to have river frontage. The long, narrow strips were called "ribbon grants". In 1830, the colonists travelled up the river to the land allotted to them. That year, the Swan River flooded several times, washing away crops and inundating shelters. The colonists were unlucky, as floods were not an annual occurrence. Most of these colonists either died or left the area soon after.

After it was abandoned, several other people bought the land, including Peter Broun (Location S) and William Henry Drake (Location U). With numerous other land holdings around the colony, however, they never lived on or improved the land. The last colonists, the Drummond family, left the area in 1836. By 1833, a track was cleared connecting Perth to Guildford. The track was useable by carriages, but the sandy soil made it difficult. When The Causeway opened in 1836, a route south of the river became the main route from Perth to Guildford, making the track north of the river a minor route. Because of this, the track deteriorated to the point that some people "refused to allow their horses to go for hire on this track". That track is a precursor to what is now Guildford Road.

Between 1830 and 1880, only two houses are known to have been built in the area: one owned by Frederick Sherwood, the other by John Scrivener. Neither house is still standing. The oldest remaining piece of physical evidence of European settlement in the area is an olive tree on Slade Street, supposedly planted in the 1840s and used as a place for religious services. That olive tree is now represented on the City of Bayswater's logo. A mulberry tree cut down in the 1970s had 130 growth rings.

=== Initial development in the 1880s ===
In 1881, the Fremantle–Guildford railway line was built. There were many arguments over whether it should be laid north or south of the river. The northern option was the one eventually chosen. What was previously a several hours-long trip to get from what is now Bayswater to Perth or Guildford took twenty minutes by train. There was now opportunity to develop the isolated and underused land grants. Patronage on the line exceeded everyone's expectations. Many racegoers got off the line at the part closest to the Perth Race Course, hiked through the bush to the river, where men with boats were waiting to ferry people across the river to the race course. Around 1885 a footbridge was built across the river, near what is now the Eric Singleton Bird Sanctuary, to serve racegoers.

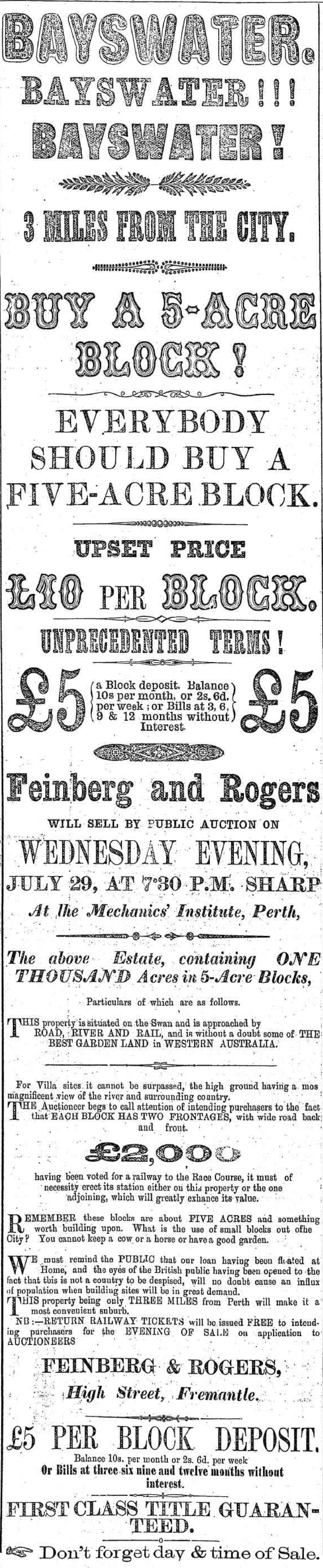
Bayswater Estate advertisement in The Daily News on 9 July 1885

In June 1885, increased interest in Perth's real estate market began, labelled a "land boom". William Henry Drake, the owner of Location U, died in Bayswater, London, in 1884. Stephen Henry Parker, using his power of attorney for Drake, placed Location U on the property market. The advertisement for the land did little to recommend it, making no mention of the railway line or the possibilities for subdivision. Joseph Rogers, a property developer from New South Wales who saw the land's potential, unlike the locals who saw it as a backwater, bought the land. In July 1885, Rogers, along with his associate Feinberg, placed the land, now named the Bayswater Estate, on the property market again, this time subdivided into 2 ha (5-acre) lots. Whether the name had any connection to Drake is unknown. It was common practice for property developers to pick a pompous name for an estate at random, but it is possible that Rogers and Feinberg named it after Drake's place of death. Either way, the suburb of Bayswater is named after the Bayswater Estate. A road was surveyed running down the middle of the estate, named Coode Street north of the railway line and King William Street south of the railway line. In the 9 July 1885 edition of The Daily News, an advertisement appeared for the Bayswater Estate that was probably the largest ever real estate advertisement to run in any Western Australian newspaper at the time. The advertisement spanned the entire height of the page and covered over a quarter of its width.

People began buying the land. One person who purchased a lot was Thomas Molloy, a City of Perth councillor and land investor. He had been led to believe his land was close to the railway, but it was actually on the northern end of the Bayswater Estate, far from the present City of Bayswater and closer to Wanneroo than the railway. When he discovered this, he made his annoyance clear to Winthrop Hackett, the editor of The West Australian. On the day of the second auction, Hackett printed an attack on the auctioneers and the Bayswater Estate land in the newspaper. The second and third auctions were poorly attended. As a result, Rogers and Feinberg sued The West Australian for defamation, alleging it had caused them a financial loss because of the poorly attended auctions. They won the case, being awarded damages of one farthing, however they were never paid.

The decision to subdivide the land into 2 ha (5-acre) lots rather than smaller lots typical in a town meant the estate remained rural. Landowners made use of the land for nurseries, dairies and other agricultural activities. As there was no supervision of building standards, houses were constructed out of corrugated iron and weatherboard, built by the landowners themselves. By January 1886, a branch line was built through Location T over to the river near the Eric Singleton Bird Sanctuary's current location. The intention was for it to be part of a railway to Busselton, however this never happened. A footbridge was built later that year, so people no longer had to be ferried across the river.

During the late 1880s, Locations V, W and X changed hands several times. Locations X and W were eventually subdivided. Many of the lots were sold to speculators from Victoria and New South Wales, but a few buyers actually lived on their lots. Unlike the other locations, Location V was not subdivided. The only other ribbon grant in the district was Location T, which remained with the original owner's family. However, part of Location T was leased to Henry Walkenden, who established a brickworks there in 1887. This was the first industrial site in Bayswater. It employed up to 18 men, some of whom camped on the surrounding land. The railway was likely used to transport the bricks. Remnants of the site, like Gobba Lake, which was a clay pit, still exist to this day.

=== New services in the 1890s ===
The first attempt to get a school for Bayswater occurred in 1889, however, the campaign for that was quickly knocked back by the state Board of Education. A second, more thought-out campaign occurred in 1892. Residents managed to convince the Board of Education to take a tour of the area. Afterwards, the Board decided Bayswater deserved a school. A site was purchased, and a one room weatherboard building was constructed. Named Bayswater State School, with 29 pupils when it opened in 1894, its size was insufficient. In the years that followed, the head teacher wrote several letters to the Education Department about overcrowding. By 1896, there were about 12 pupils who had to stand in the aisles, with the head teacher forecasting overcrowding would only worsen. The first upgrade occurred in 1900.

Another matter of importance for residents in the 1890s was for Bayswater to get its own road board. Bayswater was a small settlement, awkwardly straddling the boundaries of the Perth and Swan Road Districts. In December 1894, residents held a meeting to petition for a road board. The government rejected the petition. A second attempt to get Bayswater's own road board in 1896 was successful. Both the Perth and Swan Road Boards were happy to relinquish responsibility for building roads there. The Bayswater Road Board was gazetted on 5 March 1897, becoming one of several new local government areas established in the 1890s along the railway. A wooden ratepayers' hall was constructed on Guildford Road.

Bayswater gained many other services in the 1890s. A post office was established on King William Street in 1895. The railway was duplicated. Shortly thereafter, in 1896, the Bayswater railway station was constructed. The railway became a major employer in Bayswater, with the station needing many staff for passenger services and the goods yard. Some made the commute to Perth by train daily. After lobbying by the Western Australian Turf Club, the branch line was extended across the river to the Perth Race Course in 1897. Baptist, Anglican, Methodist and Catholic churches were established, Bayswater's Baptist church being the first one in Western Australia.

Further subdivision of the 2 ha (5-acre) lots at Location U occurred between 1895 and 1899. Roads were surveyed in a grid pattern instead of following the terrain. Steep hills would make it a challenge for the roads board to construct them and for horse-drawn vehicles to traverse them afterwards. Location W was subdivided further, effectively creating two settlements in Bayswater. Despite these subdivisions, Bayswater was not densely populated. Because the land was cheap, many people bought several adjoining lots for a garden. Houses were still shoddily built, and most are no longer standing. Dairies, slaughterhouses and market gardens were interspersed between the houses, and more brickyards and an ironworks were established in the eastern part of Bayswater. In 1897, the population of Bayswater was estimated to be 400. At the end of the decade, Bayswater was no longer an isolated and poorly serviced district.

=== After Federation ===
After the Federation of Australia in 1901, there were tensions between the agricultural and residential elements of Bayswater. William Williams, a member of the road board, complained about cattle being a nuisance. Dairyman and fellow board member Edward Browne fought back, saying "cattle had been the making of the place". The piggeries received many more complaints, however, with concerns about their odour and noise from the pigs being killed on site. In 1903, the Bayswater Local Board of Health, controlled by the same members as the road board, disallowed piggeries from being situated between the river and 1.6 kilometres (1 mile) north of the railway line. In 1903 the road board also began regulating subdivisions, putting an end to small blocks and streets close together.

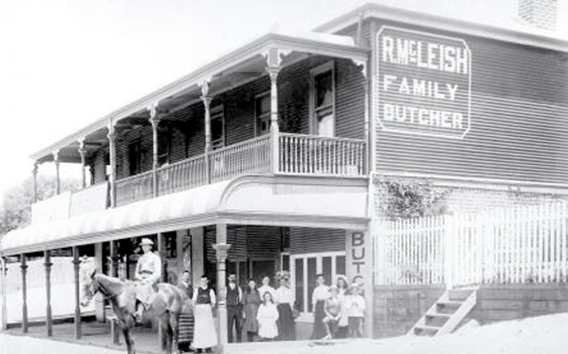
Butcher store on King William Street made of corrugated metal, built in 1906. The building still stands today and is used as a liquor store.

The opening of the Midland Railway Workshops down the railway line in 1904 fuelled much growth, with workers migrating from the eastern states and overseas, particularly Britain. By 1908, many residents of Bayswater were from Victoria. Of thirty-three births in 1908, nineteen fathers and eighteen mothers were from Victoria. Most of the structures built after 1904 were made of bricks and weatherboard, and those made of corrugated metal were no longer makeshift buildings. These buildings were designed to be more permanent, and many still stand today. The West Australian noted in March 1909 that "the days of the 'humpy' (temporary shelter) have passed away" and "very few houses in the town are now without a metalled road to connect them with the railway station".

A group of commercial buildings formed along King William Street in the 1900s, some of which were actually designed by an architect. In 1904, Gold Estates of Australia, a gold prospecting company that had branched out to real estate, acquired Location V, the sole remaining intact ribbon grant. The company subdivided the land, marketing it as the Oakleigh Estate. This estate bridged the gap between the two developed areas of Bayswater, making it one contiguous settlement. By 1909, the population boom had ended, leaving the population of Bayswater to rise steadily after that. In 1909, the King William Street subway was constructed. Prior to that, people had to use either the footbridge at Bayswater station or cross the railway at grade. Soon enough, there were complaints about herds of cattle going through it in the morning. The 1911 census recorded the population of Bayswater being 1,758. The outbreak of World War I brought British migration to a standstill. Bayswater stagnated and land values plummeted. People who tried to sell their land failed and had to take it off the market. Part of the problem in selling was the water table rising across Perth – areas that were once useable became inundated with water. Tram services were built to Victoria Park and Nedlands but not Bayswater, despite a campaign by the Oakleigh Park Progress Association. After the war however, Bayswater's commercial centre expanded. In 1921, the population of Bayswater was 2,365.

In the middle to late 1920s, the Roads Board began to put more care into Bayswater's amenities. One initiative they undertook was to acquire a market garden in the suburb's town centre to be converted to a park. It was considered undesirable for a market garden to be on the main street of Bayswater, and so the land was turned into Whatley Gardens. It would later be named Bert Wright Park. Several modern industrial complexes were built in the middle to late 1920s. These included a foundry in 1927 and a large Cresco fertiliser factory, which led to numerous complaints about air pollution. This was a catalyst for the district's first town planning scheme, which reinforced locating industry in the eastern part of Bayswater and kept it out of the western part. There were several teething problems, with people unaccustomed to restrictions on where they could set up businesses, and several petitions and appeals to the town planning scheme resulted. This was one of the first town planning schemes in Western Australia, and it preceded the Stephenson–Hepburn Report by 22 years.

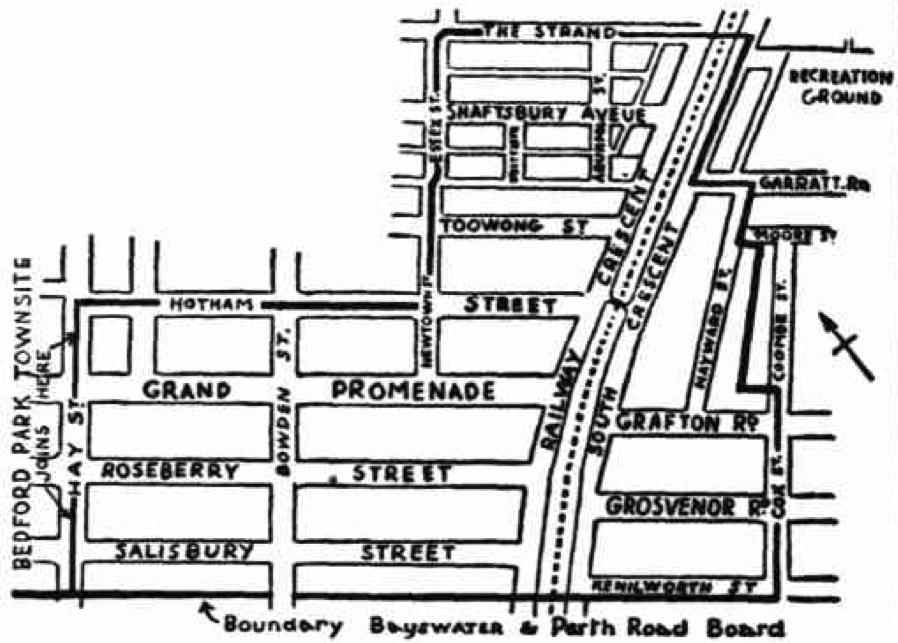
Meltham Heights townsite map published in The West Australian on 27 July 1937

During the 1930s, dairies around Bayswater slowly started to disappear. The Whole Milk Act of 1933 made setting up new dairies substantially difficult. The established dairies were a source of numerous complaints about noise, dust and the traffic caused by them, among other things. In 1934, a railway station between Bayswater and Maylands was first suggested. The first Garratt Road Bridge was built across the Swan River in 1934, linking Bayswater and Ascot when it opened on 1 January 1935. In the late 1930s, the townsites of Bayswater and Meltham Heights were gazetted, Meltham Heights consisting of the area around Hotham Street. Transport for Meltham Heights was an issue. With the area being working class, car ownership was uncommon. People agitated for a railway station at Meltham, however, that was a while off.

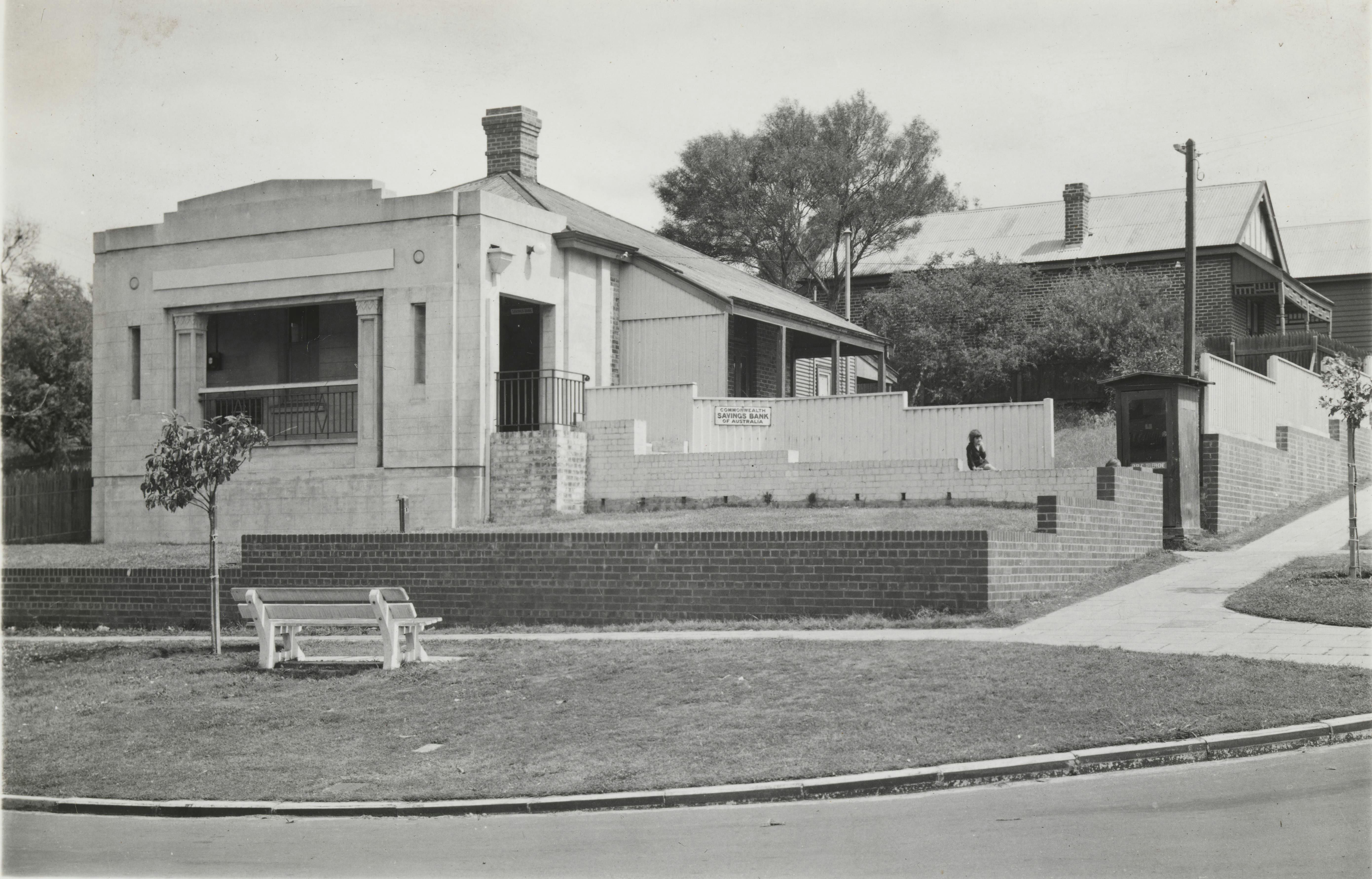
Bayswater Post Office, 1942.

From April 1942 to the middle of 1943, Bayswater became the centre of army signalling operations in Perth. They were stationed there in anticipation of a Japanese invasion of Western Australia. Many homes and buildings were taken over for the purposes of signalling. The town hall was used by the military, and the road board had to pack its operations into the small parts of the building that were available. A large aerial was put up at the present-day site of Hillcrest Primary School. New factories were constructed and existing factories were converted to supplying military equipment. The federal government constructed a factory in between Garratt Road and Milne Street, in the middle of a residential area instead of the large industrial area just to the east, irritating residents and the road board.

=== Post World War II ===
Bayswater and its surrounding suburbs' population surged following the end of World War II. Housing construction, which was non-existent during the war, proceeded at a rapid rate post-war. Development occurred in Meltham Heights, and construction of Meltham station finally began in 1947. Shortages of labour and materials prevented the station's completion until 1949. A police station opened in Bayswater in 1954. The Belmont spur line closed in 1956 after fire damaged the bridge crossing the Swan River.

Because of the considerable growth, a new primary school was necessary. The Department of Education foresaw a large protest if a new school was not open by 1950. A site atop a hill on Coode Street was selected in March 1949, however its steep nature delayed construction. With an urgent need for the new school to open, three classrooms were transported from East Fremantle to the site. The school opened in 1950 to 120 pupils and criticisms of its basic facilities. The school's buildings were expanded over the course of the decade, and in 1958, its population was approximately 700. The population of Bayswater Primary School was also burgeoning, with 700 students in 1954. Its facilities were far too small, but the Department of Education did little about it. In August 1957, the school caught fire, destroying the original 1894 building, as well as several classrooms and the administration section. This forced the government to construct new and better facilities.

A proposal by the railway department for the East Perth railway marshalling yards to be relocated to Bayswater attracted protesters. They pointed out that the Midland line would be electrified eventually and Bayswater would be on the outskirts of Perth. The railway department ignored the protesters, resuming the land of 33 houses. The 1955 Stephenson–Hepburn report recommended the marshalling yards be built in the Kewdale–Belmont area instead, ending the plan for marshalling yards in Bayswater. The Stephenson–Hepburn report also had a negative impact on Bayswater, proposing that two highways be built through the suburb. One would run along the river, named Swan River Drive, and the other from north to south, named the Beechboro-Gosnells Highway. The Metropolitan Region Scheme, adopted in 1963, accepted most of the recommendations of the Stephenson–Hepburn report, including the two proposed highways. The scheme had zoned large chunks of land through Bayswater as reserves for controlled access highways. Those who owned land zoned for the highways could not build on it, causing much frustration. Swan River Drive was particularly controversial, as its route followed the Swan River foreshore.

Starting in 1961, the Swan River foreshore in Bayswater was used as a landfill. Unusable for much else because of seasonal flooding and wetlands not being valued, the aim was to fill in any low-lying parts along the river and cover the area with grass to create a reserve. The Shires of Bassendean, Bayswater and Perth made use of the landfill for 17 years. Between the 1960s and 1980s, the names for the communities of Meltham, Oakleigh Park and Whatley disappeared as these suburbs were absorbed into Bayswater. This began in 1967, when they were allocated the same postcodes as Bayswater. Whatley, in particular, put up an unsuccessful fight to retain its identity.

In 1971–72, the second Garratt Road Bridge was built parallel to the 1934 bridge, resulting in two lanes in each direction across the river. The newer bridge was the last wooden bridge constructed in Perth, and both are now heritage listed. In 1973, the shire opened Mertome Village, the first aged care complex to be built by a local government in Australia. The name is a shortening of Merv Toms, who was chairman of the road board in the 1950s, and a local member of parliament who played a significant role in managing the Mertome Village project. The village signifies the changing role of local government in Australia, from building roads to providing social services. Around the early 1970s, Bayswater was almost developed to its current extent. The last areas to be developed being the residential area in the suburb's north-east. Coming into the late 1970s, it was realised that having a waste landfill by the river was an environmental hazard, and so the landfill was closed in 1980. A waste transfer station was established on Collier Road, and a new landfill was established at Red Hill.

In the 1980s, the plans for Swan River Drive were scrapped, much to the relief of residents. The Beechboro-Gosnells Highway went ahead, with the first section between Railway Parade and Morley Drive in Morley opening in 1984. However, upon opening its name was Tonkin Highway. Various roads, including Beechboro Road, were split apart by the highway. Tonkin Highway was extended southwards to connect over the river in 1988, creating a new interchange at Guildford Road and fully severing the two sides of Bayswater. The highway relieved heavy congestion through Bayswater, particularly at the Bayswater Subway and Garratt Road Bridge.

=== 21st century ===
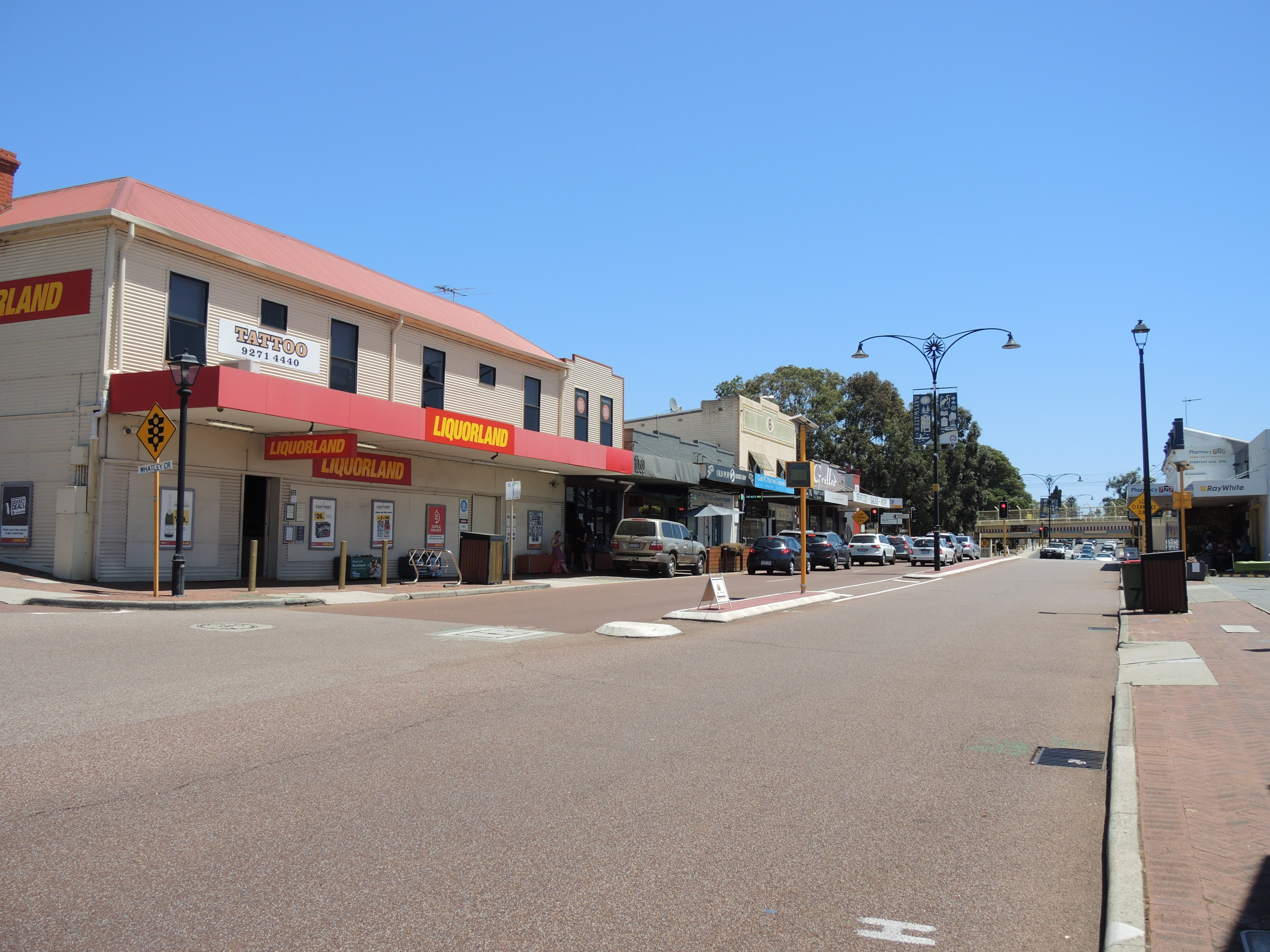
Bayswater town centre, 2020

As of the 2010s and 2020s, development in the Bayswater town centre and around Meltham station is a contentious issue. The City of Bayswater started work on a structure plan for the Bayswater town centre in November 2015. This plan would cover building heights, land uses and connections for cars, pedestrians and cyclists. A draft was released in July 2017, and public comments on it were invited in August 2017.

In June 2019, DevelopmentWA (previously the Metropolitan Redevelopment Authority) began the process of expanding the Midland Redevelopment Area to include the areas around Bayswater station and High Wycombe station, renaming it the Metronet East Redevelopment Area. DevelopmentWA said the purpose of the redevelopment area was to "maximise development opportunities arising from the station upgrades and help create a well-designed and connected community hub." Its purpose would be to take development planning control away from the local government and the Western Australian Planning Commission (WAPC), and give it to DevelopmentWA. The boundaries of the area were formally established in May 2020. A draft redevelopment scheme for Metronet East was released in August 2020. The redevelopment scheme was formally adopted in May 2021, transferring planning authority from the City of Bayswater and the WAPC to DevelopmentWA. The redevelopment scheme provides the legal process for applying for development in the redevelopment area.

In July 2021, draft design guidelines for the Bayswater section of the Metronet East Redevelopment Area were released to public comment. The design guidelines are intended to guide the redevelopment of land within the redevelopment area, including guides for building heights, setbacks, and provision of car parking spaces. The draft guidelines allow for buildings as tall as 15 stories in the central part of the town centre. The development scheme allows for buildings to break the design guidelines if DevelopmentWA approves the development application for that building.

In 2019 and 2020, the City of Bayswater proposed to turn part of eastern Bayswater into a new suburb called Meltham, reminiscent of the old townsite of Meltham Heights. The new suburb would have centred on Meltham station within an area of 107 hectares (260 acres). Responses from the residents indicated that 54% were opposed to the renaming for various reasons, including criticism of the name, worries that property values would decrease and the association of Meltham with anti-social behaviour. City of Bayswater councillors decided in May 2020 not to proceed with the new suburb.

In February 2020, City of Bayswater councillors voted to heritage-protect the entire town centre. This resulted in a backlash from some residents and the community group Future Bayswater, who say that it may hamper development and protect buildings with little-to-no heritage value. However, other residents and the community group Bayswater Deserves Better praised the move to protect heritage. The structure plan was finalised in June 2020.

== Geography ==
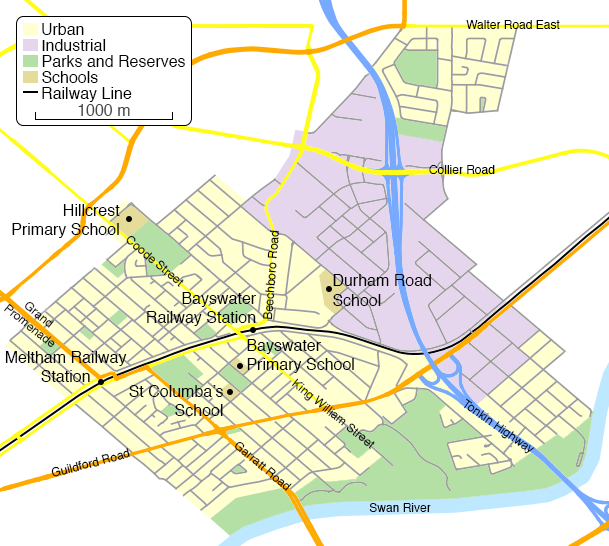
Map of Bayswater

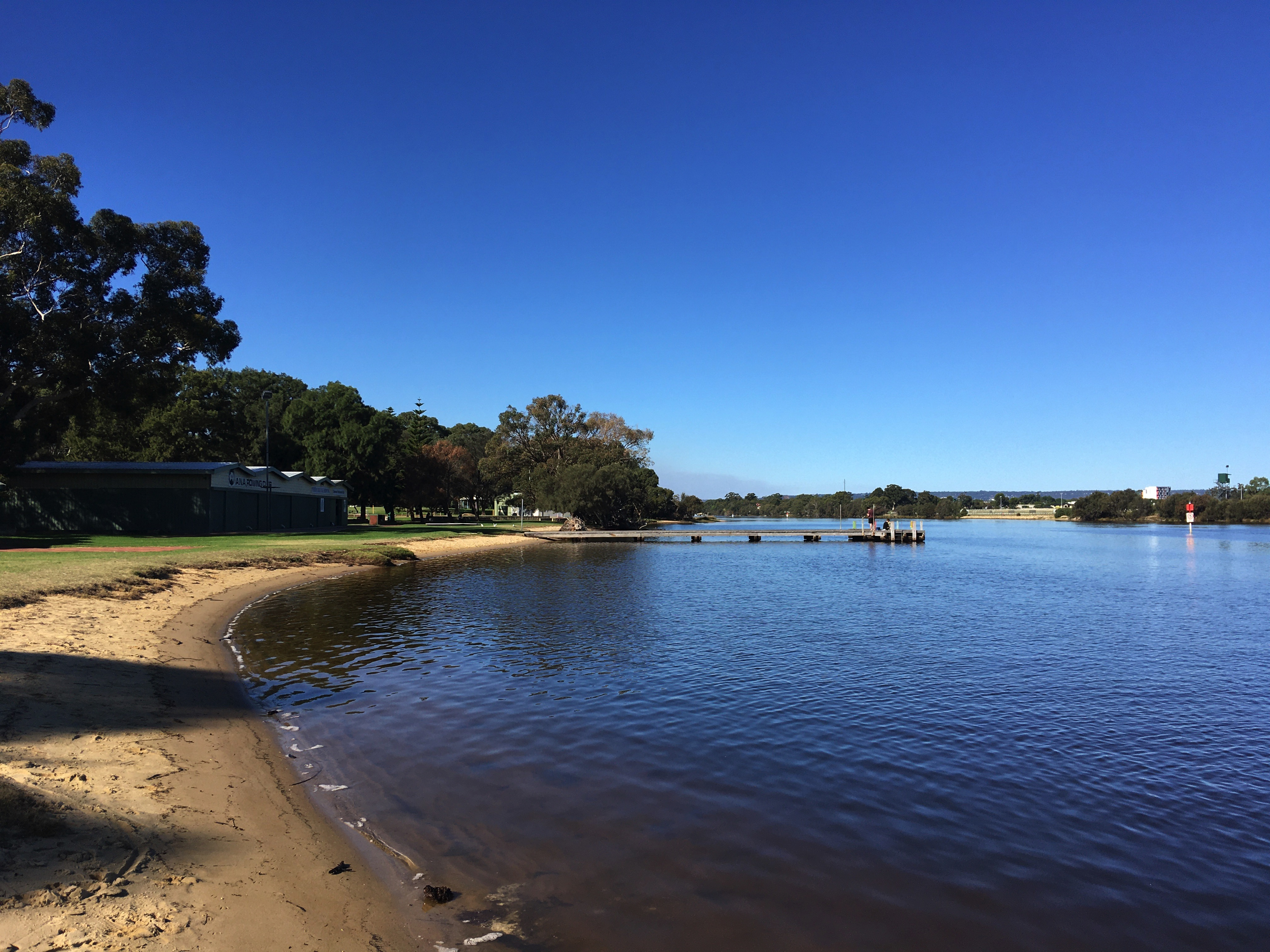
Swan River near Garratt Road Bridge

Bayswater is located 6 kilometres (4 mi) north-east of the central business district (CBD) of Perth, the capital of Western Australia, 15 kilometres (9 mi) east of the Indian Ocean, and covers an area of 9.83 square kilometres (3.80 sq mi). The elevation ranges from 2 metres (7 ft) on the banks of the Swan River to 45 metres (148 ft) at Hillcrest Primary School. The suburb is bounded on the south by the Swan River, with Ascot on the opposite side of the river, bounded to the west by Maylands, to the north by Bedford, Embleton and Morley, and to the east by Bassendean and Ashfield, which are in the Town of Bassendean. Bayswater also shares corners with Inglewood and Eden Hill.

Bayswater consists predominantly of low-density single-family detached homes, zoned as "urban" in the Metropolitan Region Scheme. There is an industrial area in the eastern parts of the suburb and a small town centre around King William Street and Whatley Crescent. The Tonkin Highway and the Midland railway line divide the suburb.

The streets throughout the suburb mostly follow a grid pattern. The roads perpendicular to the Swan River are remnants from the rectangular ribbon grants which extended from the river; the roads roughly parallel to the river are remnants of the later subdivision of Bayswater into 2-hectare (5-acre) lots. Streets named after Bayswater's early residents and landowners include Whatley Crescent named after Anne and John Whatley, Hamilton Street named after John Hamilton, Copley Street named after Benjamin Copley, and Drake Street named after Henry Drake. Another origin of many street names in Bayswater is towns and streets in England, such as Almondbury Street, Arundel Street, Clavering Street or Shaftesbury Avenue.

Bayswater lies on the Bassendean Dunes, which formed 800,000 to 125,000 years ago during the middle Pleistocene. The dunes form low-lying hills made of heavily leached white to grey sands, which are poor at retaining nutrients. Groundwater is about 10 metres (33 ft) below the surface. The Bassendean Dunes are a part of the greater Swan Coastal Plain.

Bayswater Brook was a natural brook that ran through Bayswater and nearby suburbs, linking various swamps and creeks in the area. In the 1920s, it was modified because of development into a network of drainage channels, with some covered and some open sections. The brook discharges into the Eric Singleton Bird Sanctuary, which discharges into the Swan River. The Eric Singleton Bird Sanctuary is an artificial wetland, created after the surrounding area was used as a landfill between 1972 and 1981. The wetland had significant environmental problems until it was rehabilitated in 2015. Nearby is Gobba Lake, an artificial deepwater lake named after Gino Gobba, a former City of Bayswater councillor. It was made from a clay pit used by Walkenden's Brickworks. Gobba Lake also underwent rehabilitation to make it more attractive to flora and fauna, and better for human recreational use.

Erosion of the Swan River foreshore due to boat traffic is a problem in Bayswater. At least 5 metres (16 ft) of erosion occurred between 1995 and 2020. The City of Bayswater is currently funding works to prevent and fix erosion that has occurred.

== Demographics ==
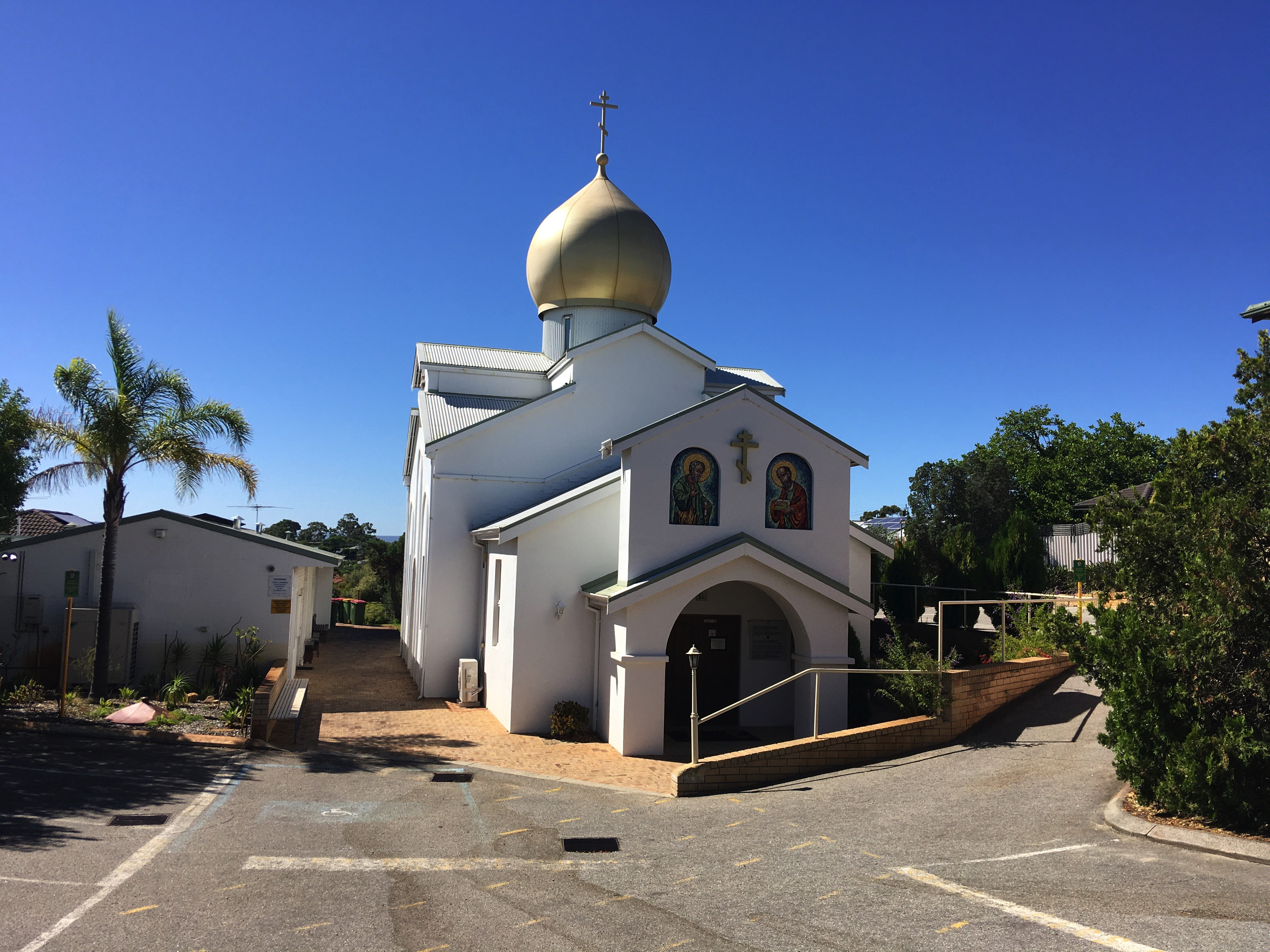
Russian Orthodox Church

Bayswater's population, according to the Australian Bureau of Statistics' 2021 census, was 15,288, an increase for each census since the 2001 census, which recorded a population of 11,303. At the 2021 census, 48.9% of residents were male and 51.1% were female. The median age was 39, above the state and national average of 38. 1.5% of residents identified as Aboriginal and Torres Strait Islander, below the state and national averages of 3.3% and 3.2% respectively.

At the 2021 census, Bayswater had a median weekly personal income of $1,015, a median weekly family income of $2,679, and a median weekly household income of $2,037, above the state averages of $848, $2,214, and $1,815 respectively. The most common occupations were professionals (31.4%), managers (14.3%), clerical and administrative workers (12.9%), technicians and trades workers (11.8%), community and personal service workers (11.0%), labourers (6.3%), sales workers (6.3%), and machinery operators and drivers (4.7%). Major industries that residents worked in were hospitals (except psychiatric hospitals) (4.8%), state government administration (3.1%), iron ore mining (2.7%), primary education (2.4%), and cafes and restaurants (2.3%).

The most common ancestries that Bayswater residents identified with at the 2021 census were English (38.1%), Australian (30.5%), Irish (11.7%), Scottish (9.5%), and Italian (7.0%). 64.8% of residents were born in Australia. The next most common birthplaces were England (6.4%), New Zealand (2.6%), India (2.4%), Vietnam (1.3%), and Ireland (1.2%). 36.5% of residents had both parents born in Australia and 41.6% of residents had both parents born in Australia. The most common religious affiliations were no religion (47.4%), Catholic (23.0%), Anglican (7.8%), not stated (5.3%), and Buddhism (2.3%). Churches in Bayswater include Saint Columba's Catholic Church, an Apostolic Church, and a Russian Orthodox Church, which is the only one in Perth.

== Parks and amenities ==
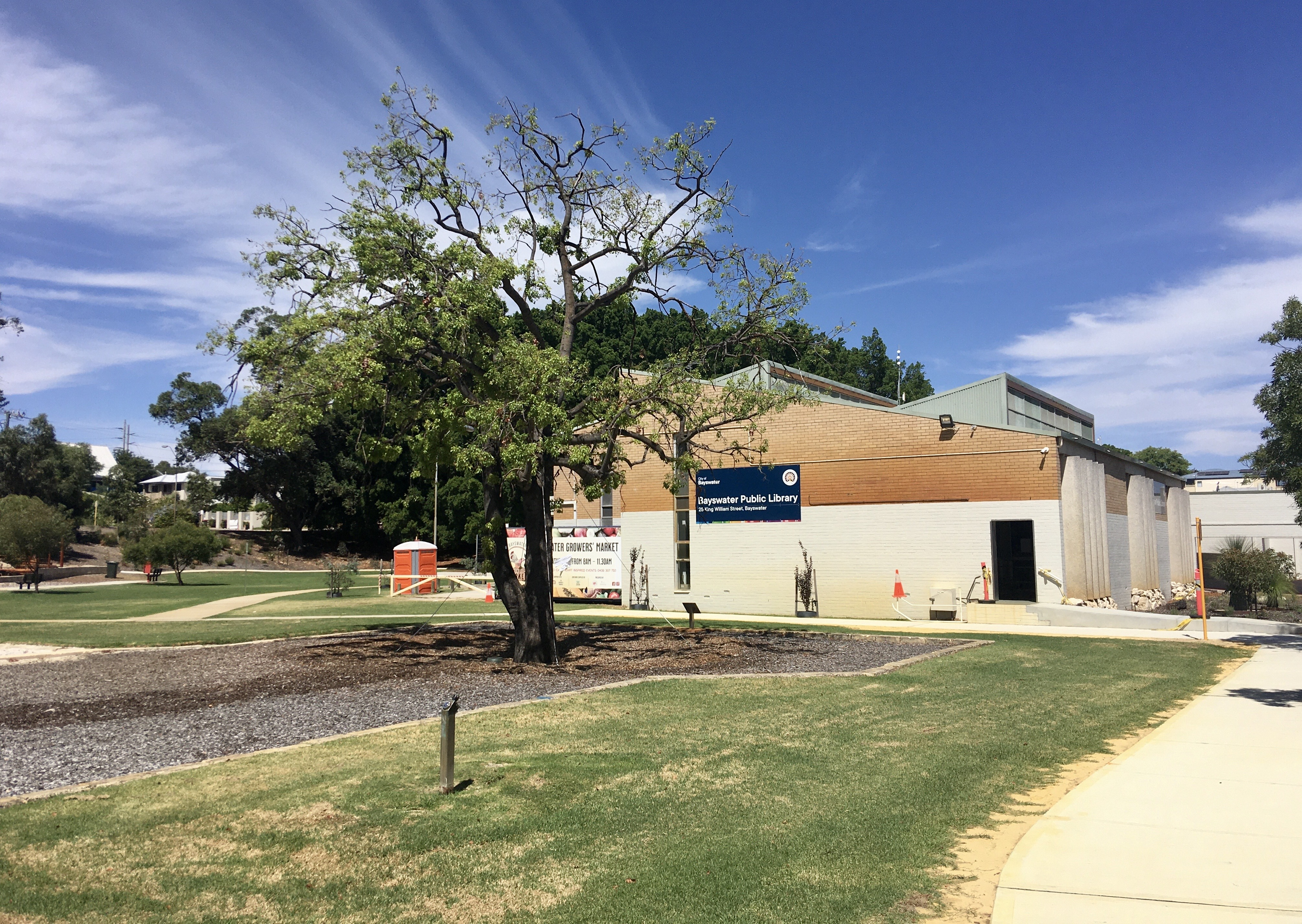
Bayswater Library and Community Centre

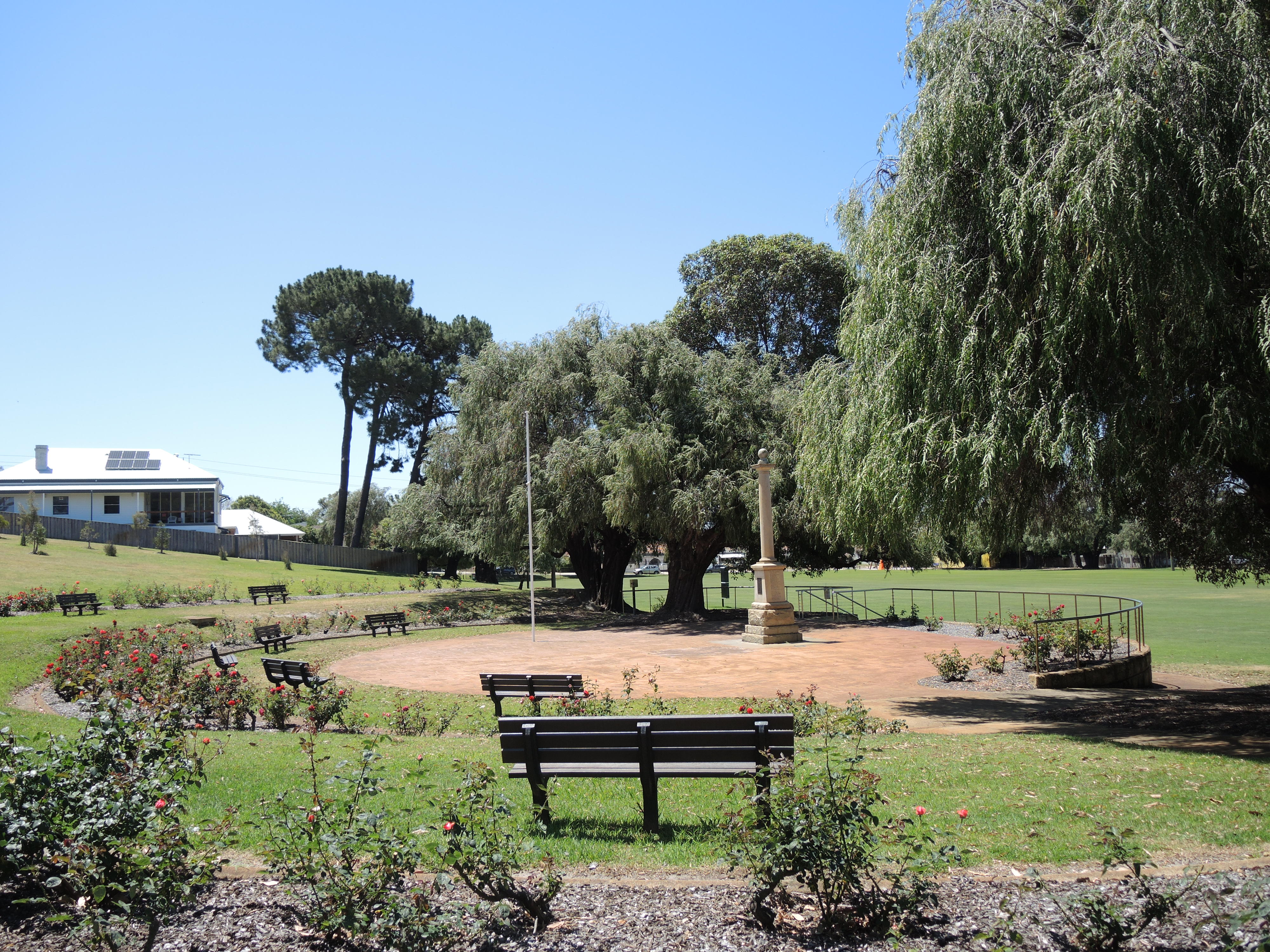
War Memorial at Halliday Park

Bayswater has a small town centre around the intersection of Whatley Crescent and King William Street. Amenities there include the Bayswater Library and Community Centre, a Bendigo Bank branch, a post office, a Western Australia Police station, a hotel and various small businesses. Businesses along Guildford Road include Muzz Buzz, Red Rooster, a Mazda dealer and a car rental. Businesses and services in the industrial area in Bayswater's east include a Bunnings and the Baywaste Transfer Station, run by Cleanaway. The nearest shopping centre to Bayswater is the Galleria in Morley. Other shopping precincts are in Bassendean, Inglewood and Maylands, all have major supermarkets.

Lining the Swan River in Bayswater are various parks and reserves. Starting from the west, the 16.4-hectare (41-acre) Baigup Wetlands are one of the last remaining areas of natural bushland along the Swan River's estuary and an important habitat for birds. A. P. Hinds Reserve is home to ANA Rowing Club, Bayswater Paddlesports Club and Bayswater Sea Scouts. Riverside Gardens is a popular park for dogs and picnics, and has a playground, boat ramp, café and a large open grassed area. Annual events held here include the Autumn River Festival and the finish line of the Avon Descent, both of which involve food stalls and entertainment. Nearby is the heritage listed Ellis House, restored by the City of Bayswater, and now a community art centre. Next to Riverside Gardens is the Eric Singleton Bird Sanctuary, an artificial wetland and bird habitat, and on the other side of Tonkin Highway is Claughton Reserve, a large park with a boat ramp and playground.

On the corner of Whatley Crescent and Garratt Road is the Frank Drago Reserve, home to the Bayswater City Soccer Club, Bayswater Bowls and Recreation Club, Bayswater Croquet Club and Bayswater Tennis Club. In the suburb's town centre, there is Bert Wright Park, which hosts the Bayswater Growers' Market every Saturday, and Halliday Park, which is home to the Bayswater Lacrosse Club and AIM Over 50 Archery Club, and has a war memorial where an annual Anzac Day dawn service is held. Between Coode Street and Drake Street, near Hillcrest Primary School, is Hillcrest Reserve, which has three ovals for Australian rules football and cricket, floodlights, cricket nets and clubrooms. The reserve is split into Upper Hillcrest Reserve and Lower Hillcrest Reserve, and is home to several amateur and junior football and cricket clubs.

== Education ==
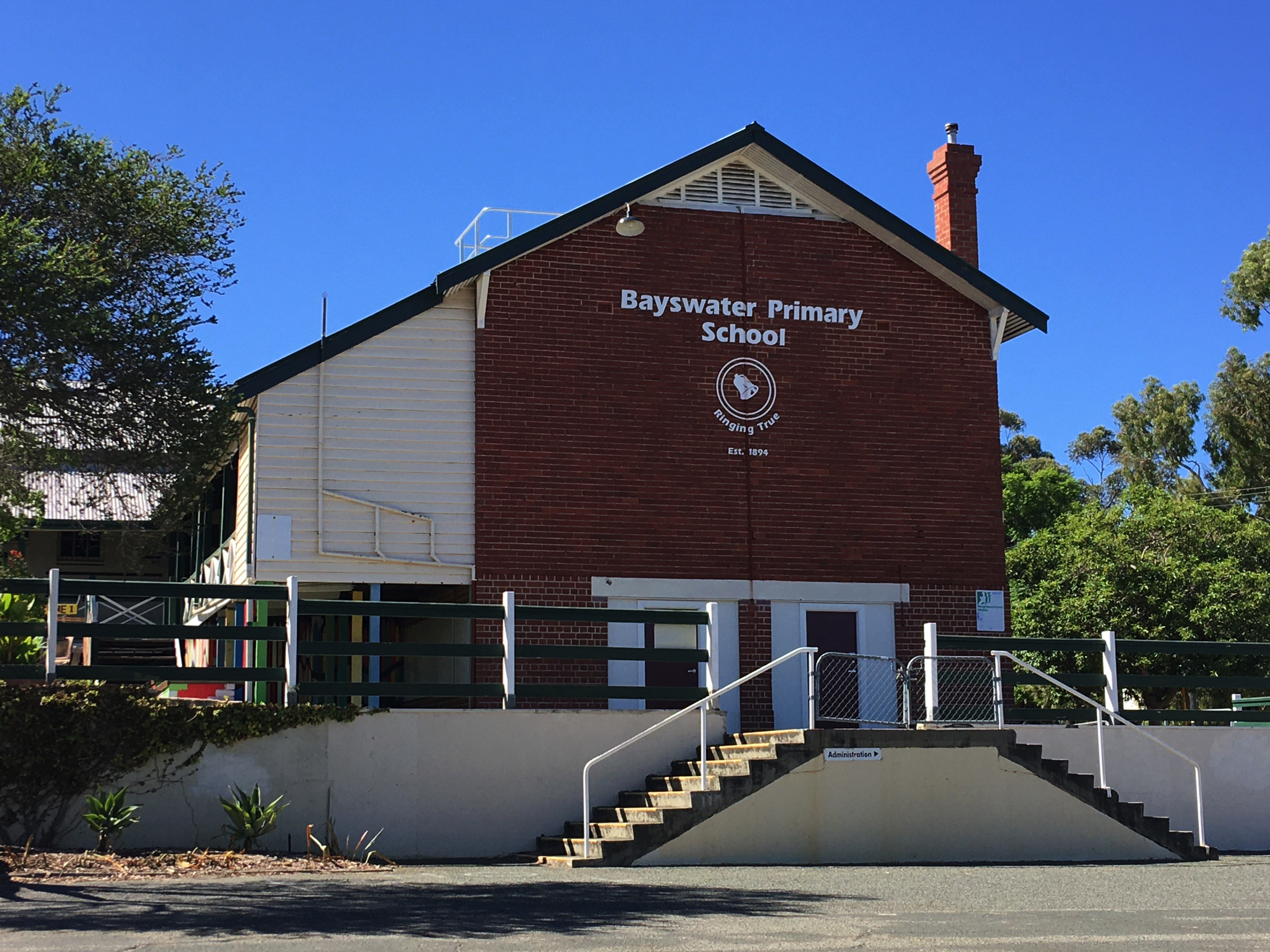
Bayswater Primary School 1894 building

The first school to open in Bayswater was Bayswater Primary School, established in 1894 as the Bayswater State School on Murray Street, near the Bayswater town centre. It caters to 60 Kindergarten students and 370 students between Pre-Primary and Year 6 as of 2020. The school received a bell from a railway locomotive in 1904. Used to call the children into class, it remains to this day, despite calls for modernisation and is the reason behind the school's motto "Ringing True".

In 1936, St Columba's School, a private Catholic primary school on Roberts Street, opened to students. It caters to almost 500 students from Pre-Kindergarten to Year 6. The third school and second public school to open in Bayswater is Hillcrest Primary School, which opened in 1950. On Bay View Street, atop the crest of a large hill, it caters to 61 Kindergarten students and 364 Pre-Primary to Year 6 students as of 2020. In 1985, Durham Road School opened in Bayswater. This school caters to students with intellectual and physical disabilities from Kindergarten to Year 12, serving students from all over Perth. The school had 200 students as of 2020.

There are no secondary schools in Bayswater, but parts of the suburb are in the local intake areas for John Forrest Secondary College and Hampton Senior High School, public high schools in Morley. In Bedford is Chisholm Catholic College, a private Catholic high school.

== Industry ==
In 2024 the Public Transport Authority purchased a site in Wootton Street that is being redeveloped as a Transperth electric bus depot.

== Governance ==
=== Local ===
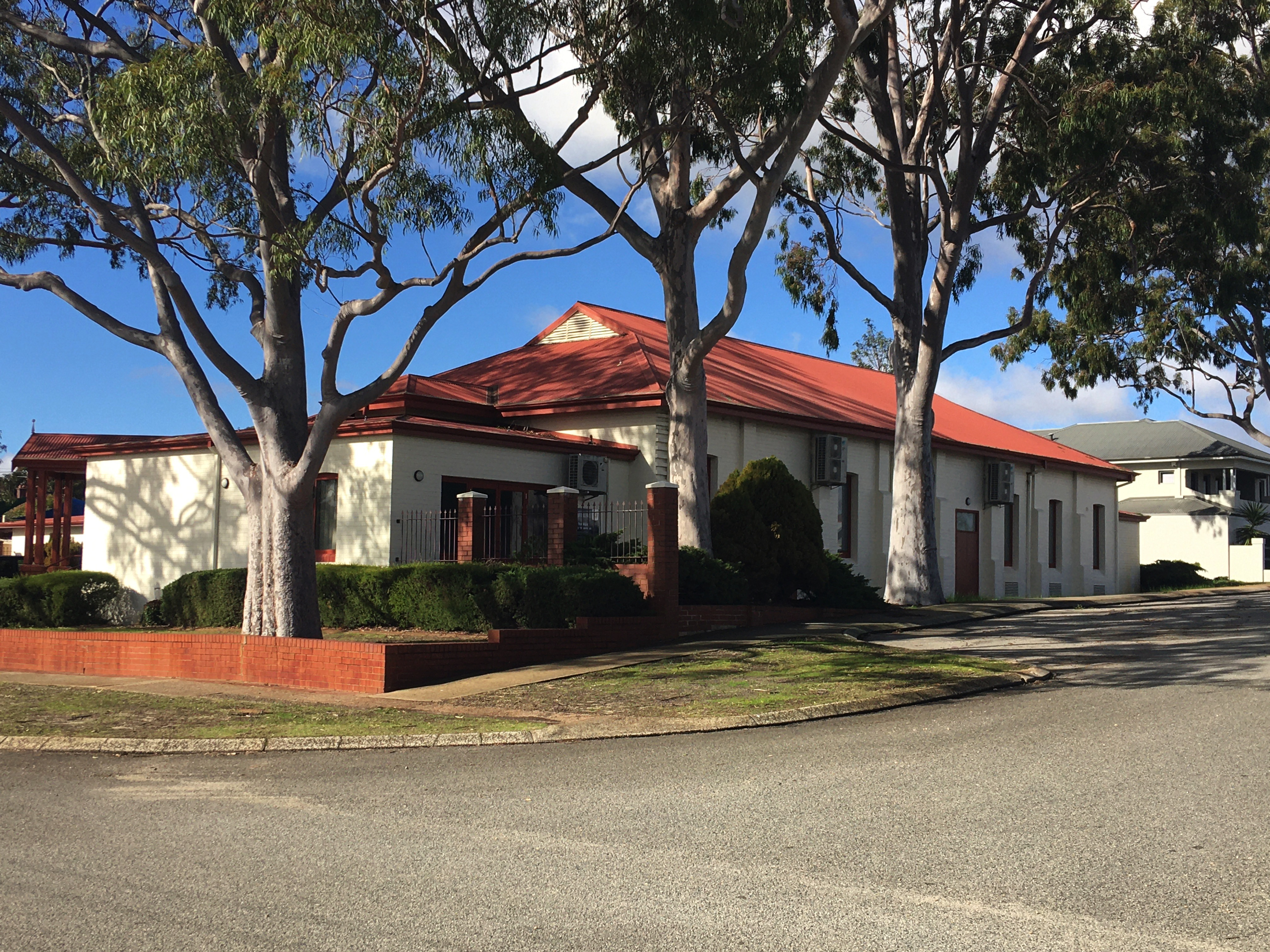
Bayswater Drill Hall, office for the Roads Board from 1907 to 1914

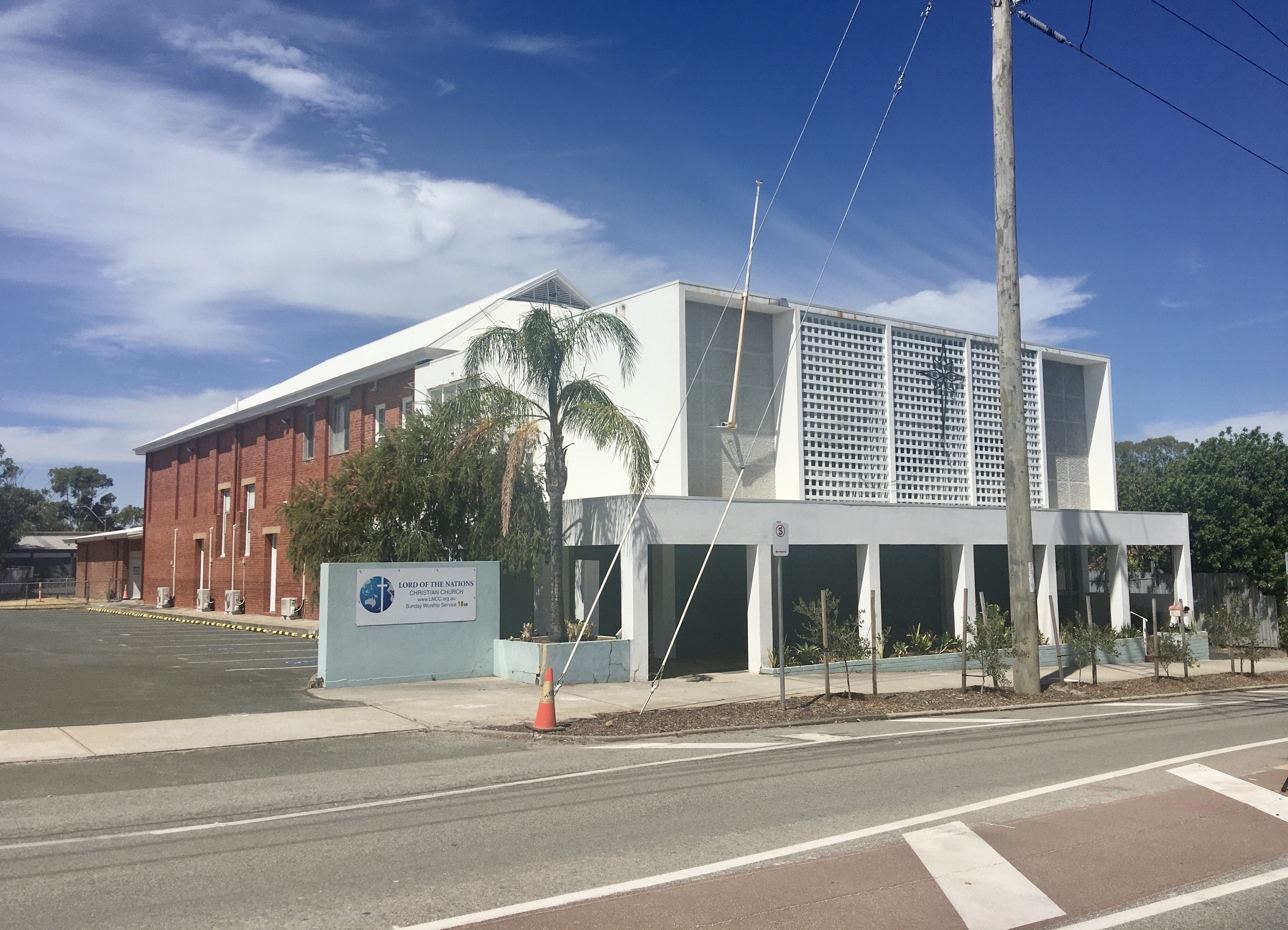
Roads Board office from 1914 to 1983. It has since been used as a church

Bayswater is in the City of Bayswater local government area. It lies mostly within the City's west ward, although there is a small portion of the suburb within its central ward. Elections are held on the third Saturday of October in every odd year, and councillors are elected to four-year terms. The councillor for the west ward is Giorgia Johnson, whose term expires in 2025. Councillors for the central ward are Assunta Meleca, whose term expires in 2025, and Steven Ostaszewskyj, whose term expires in 2027. Between 1897 and 1983, the suburb of Bayswater was the council seat of the City of Bayswater, which was known then as the Bayswater Road Board and later as the Shire of Bayswater. Among the buildings that have been used as offices for the Roads Board are Halliday House in 1897, the Bayswater Drill Hall on Murray Street from 1907 to 1914, and an office on Leake Street from 1914 to 1983.

=== State ===
In the Western Australian Legislative Assembly, Bayswater is within the electoral district of Maylands, excluding the north-eastern corner, which is within the electoral district of Bassendean. Both districts are strong seats for the centre-left Labor Party. Labor has held Maylands since 1968 and Bassendean since it was created in 1996. Maylands' current member is Dan Bull, and Bassendean's current member is Dave Kelly.

Bayswater has two polling locations: The Senior Citizens Centre / Bayswater Primary School and Hillcrest Primary School. The results below combine the results of these two polling places.

2021 state election Source: WAEC
Labor	58.5%
Greens	19.0%
Liberal	12.7%
NMV	2.1%
One Nation	1.6%

2017 state election Source: WAEC
Labor	48.6%
Liberal	22.5%
Greens	16.8%
Matheson	2.8%
Christians	1.9%

2013 state election Source: WAEC
Labor	42.7%
Liberal	37.7%
Greens	10.5%
Christians	2.6%

2008 state election Source: WAEC
Labor	41.2%
Liberal	31.0%
Greens	18.4%
CDP	3.4%

2005 state election Source: WAEC
Labor	52.6%
Liberal	23.4%
Greens	11.7%
Family First	3.7%
CDP	3.4%

2001 state election Source: WAEC
Labor	51.8%
Liberal	23.3%
Greens	9.8%
One Nation	6.2%
Democrats	3.6%

=== Federal ===
Bayswater is within the Division of Perth in the Australian House of Representatives. It is a safe seat for the Australian Labor Party, and has been held by a Labor member since 1983. Its current member is Patrick Gorman. The results below combine the results of Bayswater's two polling places, Hillcrest Primary School and the Senior Citizens Centre.

2022 federal election Source: AEC
Labor	39.9%
Greens	26.9%
Liberal	21.0%
One Nation	2.9%
Christians	1.8%

2019 federal election Source: AEC
Labor	36.2%
Liberal	29.5%
Greens	22.2%
WAP	2.0%
One Nation	1.9%

2018 Perth by-election Source: AEC
Labor	36.2%
Greens	21.6%
LDP	5.7%
Independent	5.3%
Julie Matheson	4.8%

2016 federal election Source: AEC
Labor	40.2%
Liberal	33.8%
Greens	19.0%
ODD	1.5%
LDP	1.2%

2013 federal election Source: AEC
Labor	42.8%
Liberal	32.4%
Greens	11.9%
PUP	3.2%
Christians	1.5%

2010 federal election Source: AEC
Labor	41.9%
Liberal	31.7%
Greens	16.9%
CDP	2.1%
Family First	1.0%

2007 federal election Source: AEC
Labor	47.6%
Liberal	31.4%
Greens	11.1%
CDP	1.7%
Independent	1.4%

2004 federal election Source: AEC
Labor	45.4%
Liberal	31.7%
Greens	10.2%
CDP	2.4%
Democrats	1.9%

2001 federal election Source: AEC
Labor	47.8%
Liberal	27.7%
Greens	7.7%
Democrats	7.0%
One Nation	4.2%

== Transport ==
Cars are the most popular mode of transport in Bayswater. The 2011 Census revealed that 62.9% of residents travelled to work in a car. However, bicycle and public transport usage is significantly above the state averages. 15.6% of Bayswater residents said they take public transport to work; the state average is 9.4%, and 2.7% ride a bicycle to work; the state average is 1.1%.

=== Road ===
The arterial roads which service Bayswater are Tonkin Highway, Guildford Road, Beechboro Road North, Garratt Road and Grand Promenade. Tonkin Highway is a north–south controlled access highway. Heading north on Tonkin Highway leads to Ellenbrook (20 km or 12 mi) and Joondalup (32 km or 20 mi) via Reid Highway. Heading south, the Mooro-Beeloo Bridge carries Tonkin Highway over the Swan River, which leads to Perth Airport, Armadale (33 km or 21 mi) and Roe Highway. The only other bridge over the Swan River in Bayswater is Garratt Road Bridge, which leads to Ascot and Belmont (6 km or 3.7 mi). Heading south west on Guildford Road leads to Maylands and the Perth CBD (6 km or 3.7 mi). Heading north-west on Guildford Road leads to Bassendean (4 km or 2.5 mi), Guildford (7 km or 4.3 mi) and Midland (11 km or 6.8 mi). Grand Promenade heads north-west of Bayswater and connects to Alexander Drive, Morley Drive and Dianella. Beechboro Road North heads north of Bayswater, leading to Beechboro and Malaga.

Local distributor roads in Bayswater include Beechboro Road South, Collier Road, Coode Street, King William Street, Walter Road East and Whatley Crescent. Whatley Crescent goes through the town centre and connects to Guildford Road west of Bayswater as another connection to the Perth CBD. Collier Road connects the Bayswater industrial area to Tonkin Highway and Guildford Road, as well as linking Bayswater to the Morley commercial precinct. Beechboro Road South connects the town centre and the industrial area to Broun Avenue, north of Bayswater.

King William Street is the main street through the town centre and the most direct connection between it and Guildford Road. Coode Street connects the town centre to Morley in the north. King William Street and Coode Street connect by an underpass under the railway line. A rail bridge at the underpass known as the Bayswater Subway or Bayswater Bridge was notorious for being hit by tall vehicles until replaced by a 4.8-metre-high (16 ft) viaduct in 2023. There are three other railway line crossings in Bayswater. They are, from east to west, a level crossing connecting Railway Parade and Guildford Road, a bridge carrying Tonkin Highway over the railway line and a bridge connecting Railway Parade and Whatley Crescent near Meltham station. There are four crossings of Tonkin Highway in Bayswater, two of which have an interchange with Tonkin Highway. They are, from north to south, Collier Road, which bridges over the highway and connects as a single-point urban interchange, Railway Parade, which passes under a bridge, Guildford Road, which passes under a bridge and connects as a folded diamond interchange, and Dunstone Road, a minor road which passes under a bridge.

=== Train ===
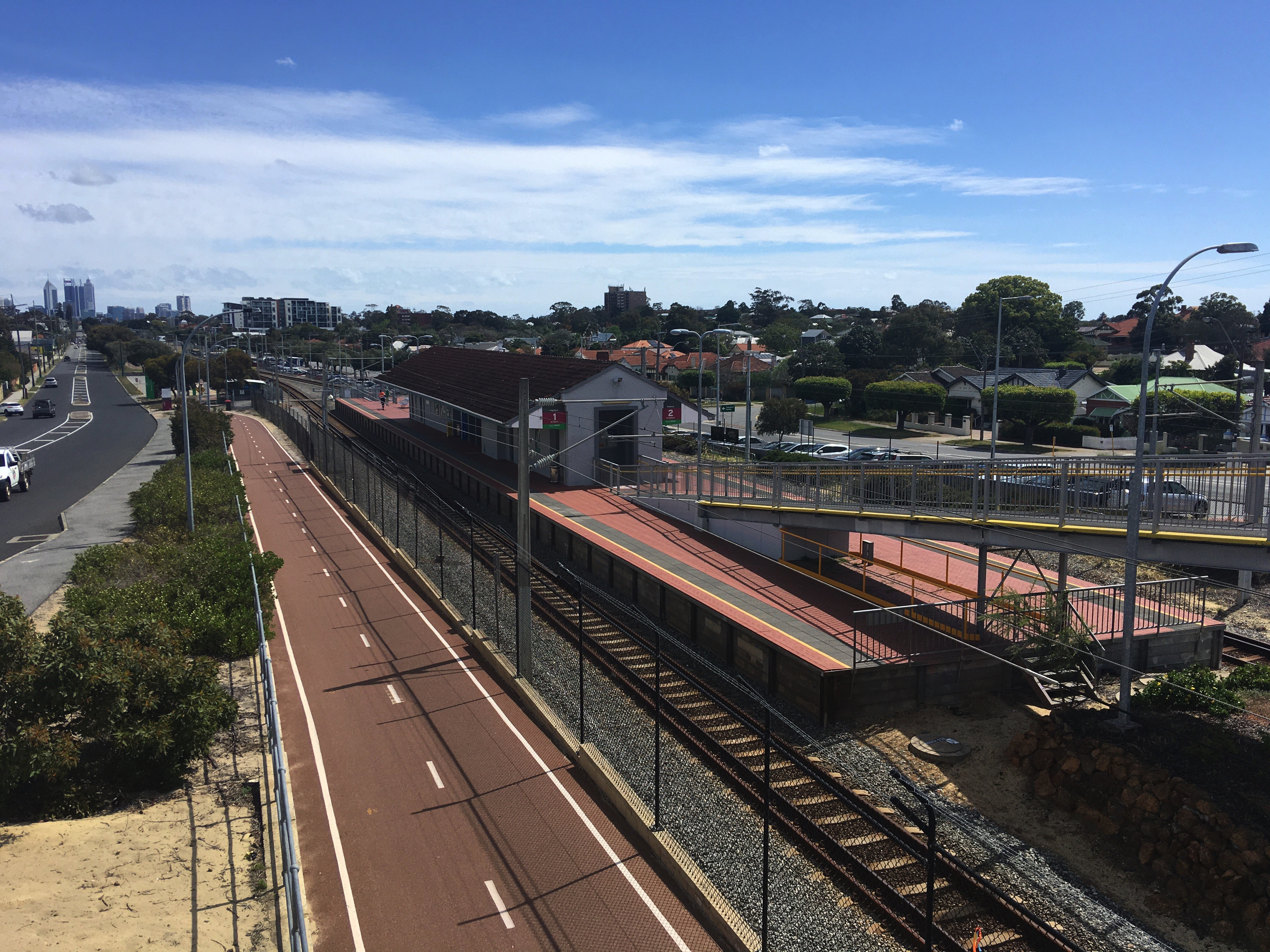
Meltham railway station and Perth–Midland principal shared path

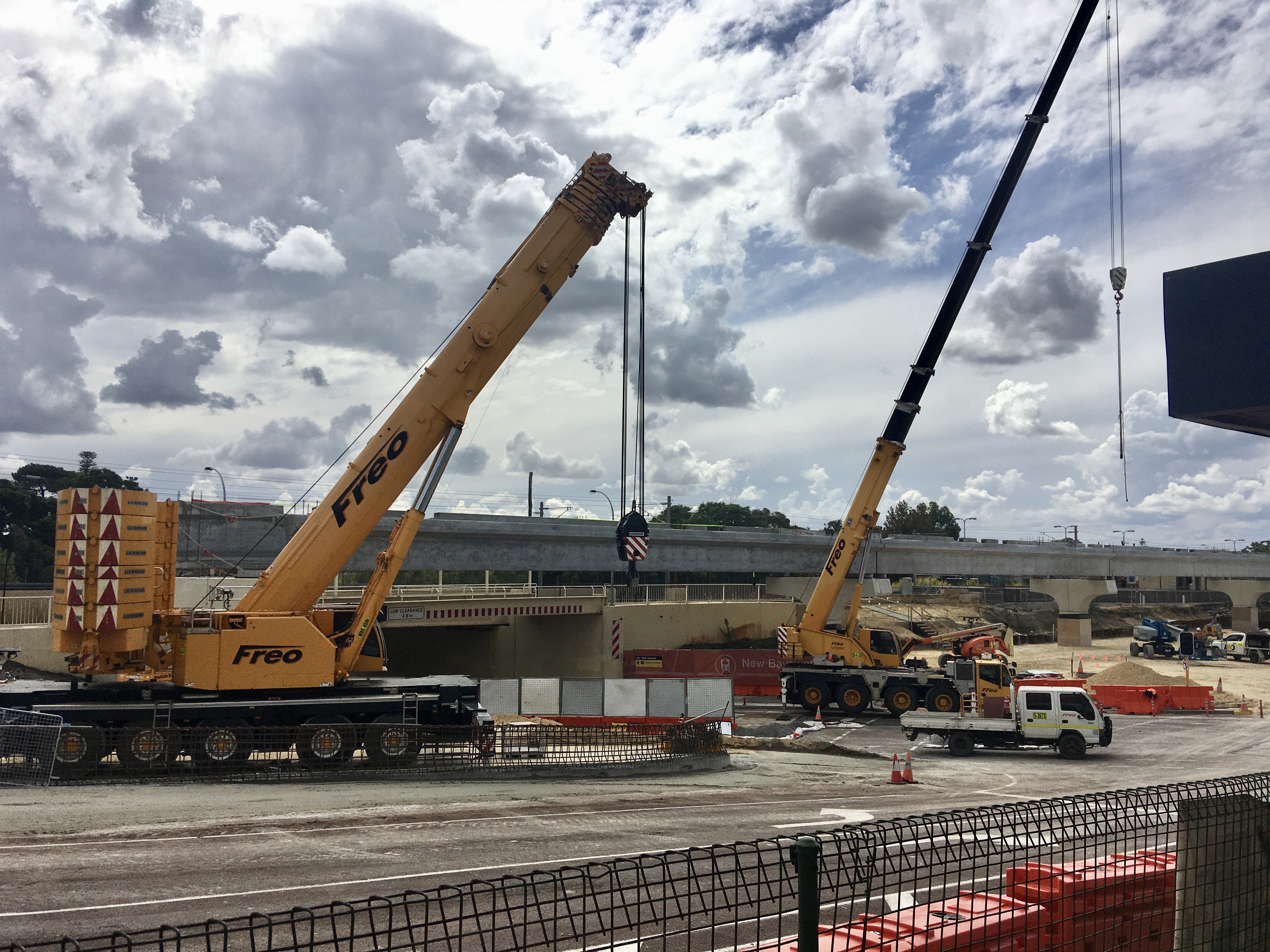
Reconstruction of Bayswater station in 2022

Bayswater and Meltham stations are located in Bayswater. These stations are served by Transperth's Airport line and Midland line services. In addition, the Ellenbrook line branches off east of Bayswater station and enters the median of Tonkin Highway. It officially opened on the 8th of December, 2024, creating a public transport connection between Bayswater and Perth's outer north-eastern suburbs. As part of the Ellenbrook line, Morley station is just north of Bayswater, which improved public transport coverage to north-eastern parts of the suburb when it opened.

=== Bus ===
Transperth bus services in Bayswater include routes 40, 41, 45, 46, 341, 342, 955, 998 and 999. They are operated by Path Transit under contract from Transperth. Path Transit also operates a bus depot in Bayswater. Routes 40 and 41 heading south-west lead to the Perth CBD. Route 40 travels along Guildford Road and King William Street, connecting to Bayswater railway station. North of there, route 40 links to Galleria bus station, traversing minor roads along the way. In Bayswater, route 41 travels along local streets south of Guildford Road, eventually connecting to Bayswater railway station. Route 45 travels down King William Street from Bayswater railway station and links to Bassendean railway station. Route 46 travels northwards from Bayswater railway station along Beechboro Road to a terminus in Embleton. Routes 341 and 342 traverse the northern boundary of Bayswater at Walter Road. To the west, they connect to Galleria bus station. To the east, they connect to Bassendean railway station and several north-eastern suburbs, including Beechboro. Route 955 travels along Collier Road. To the west, it connects to Galleria bus station. To the east, it connects to Bassendean railway station, before heading north to Ellenbrook. Routes 998 and 999, also known as the CircleRoute are a pair of high frequency bus routes which travel in a circuit around Perth. Their route through Bayswater consists of Garratt Road, Guildford Road, King William Street and Coode Street. They have a connection at Bayswater railway station. 998 travels south through Bayswater, and 999 travels north through Bayswater. The CircleRoute provides a connection to Galleria bus station, Dianella Plaza and Stirling railway station to the north, and Ascot Racecourse, Belmont Forum and Oats Street railway station to the south.

=== Cycling ===
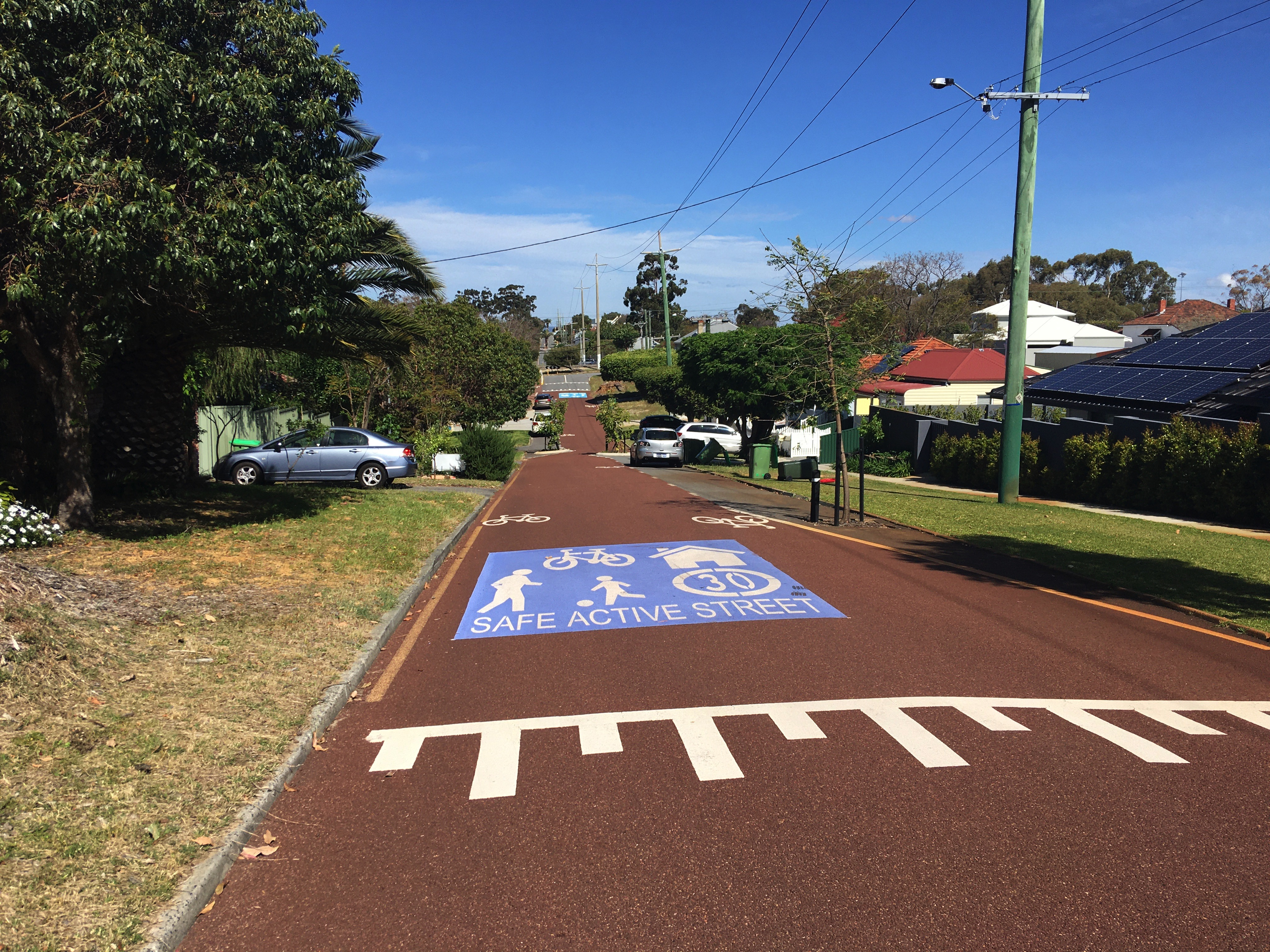
May Street bike boulevard

Bayswater is well connected by shared paths. The railway line has a Principal Shared Path (PSP) along it, which leads to the Perth CBD to the west and Midland to the east. Tonkin Highway has a PSP alongside it north of Railway Parade, constructed in 2017 as part of NorthLink WA. There is also a shared path along the river. In 2015, Leake and May Streets were selected to become a "bike boulevard", which meant slowing the speed limit to 30 km/h (19 mph) and installing traffic calming measures. The boulevard links to the river, Bayswater Primary School and the Perth–Midland PSP. The first stage opened in March 2017, but in April 2018, the City of Bayswater decided not to go ahead with the second stage, which would have seen the bike boulevard extended north through Bedford and Morley.

== Notable people ==
- Kingsley Dixon, botanist, grew up in Bayswater and renovated Halliday House
- John D'Orazio, state cabinet minister (2005–2006), member of the Western Australian Legislative Assembly (2001–2008), Mayor of Bayswater (1984–2001), Bayswater councillor (1981–2001)
- Amber-Jade Sanderson, state cabinet minister (2021–present), member of the Western Australian Legislative Assembly (2017–present)
- James Knox, Catholic Archbishop of Melbourne (1967–1974)
- Bob Marshall, amateur billiards player, member of the Western Australian Legislative Assembly (1965–1968)
- Merv Toms, Speaker of the Western Australian Legislative Assembly (1971), member of the Western Australian Legislative Assembly (1956–1971), Chairman of the Bayswater Roads Board (1951–1956), Bayswater Roads Board member (1944–1971), namesake of Mertome Village

== See also ==
- Electoral district of Bayswater (Western Australia), a state electoral district that existed from 1962 to 1968.

== Bibliography ==
- May, Catherine (2013). Changes They've Seen: The City and People of Bayswater 1827–2013. City of Bayswater. ISBN 978-0-646-59608-2.
