= Bayswater Car Rental =

Australian car rental company

- Company type: Private
- Industry: Car rentals
- Founded: 1958
- Founder: Dirk Kluck
- Headquarters: Perth, Australia
- Website: www.nobirds.com.au

Bayswater Car Rental is an Australian car rental company.

== History ==
Bayswater Car Rental was founded by Dirk Kluck in Perth, Australia in 1958 taking its name from the suburb of the same name.

== Operations ==
Today Bayswater Car Rental operates over 3,000 vehicles in Perth (Bayswater, Fremantle, Kewdale, Perth CBD and Subiaco) and Sydney (Artarmon, Mascot and Woolloomooloo).

== Controversies ==
Bayswater Car Rental has frequently attracted criticism for its No Birds slogan which has been perceived as sexist, the slogan being in reference to other car hire firms using young women to attract custom.

Campaigns using images of Aboriginals, Monica Lewinsky and Pauline Hanson have caused controversy.

== See also ==
Wicked Campers
