= Structure gauge =

Minimum clearance, height and width of railway infrastructure

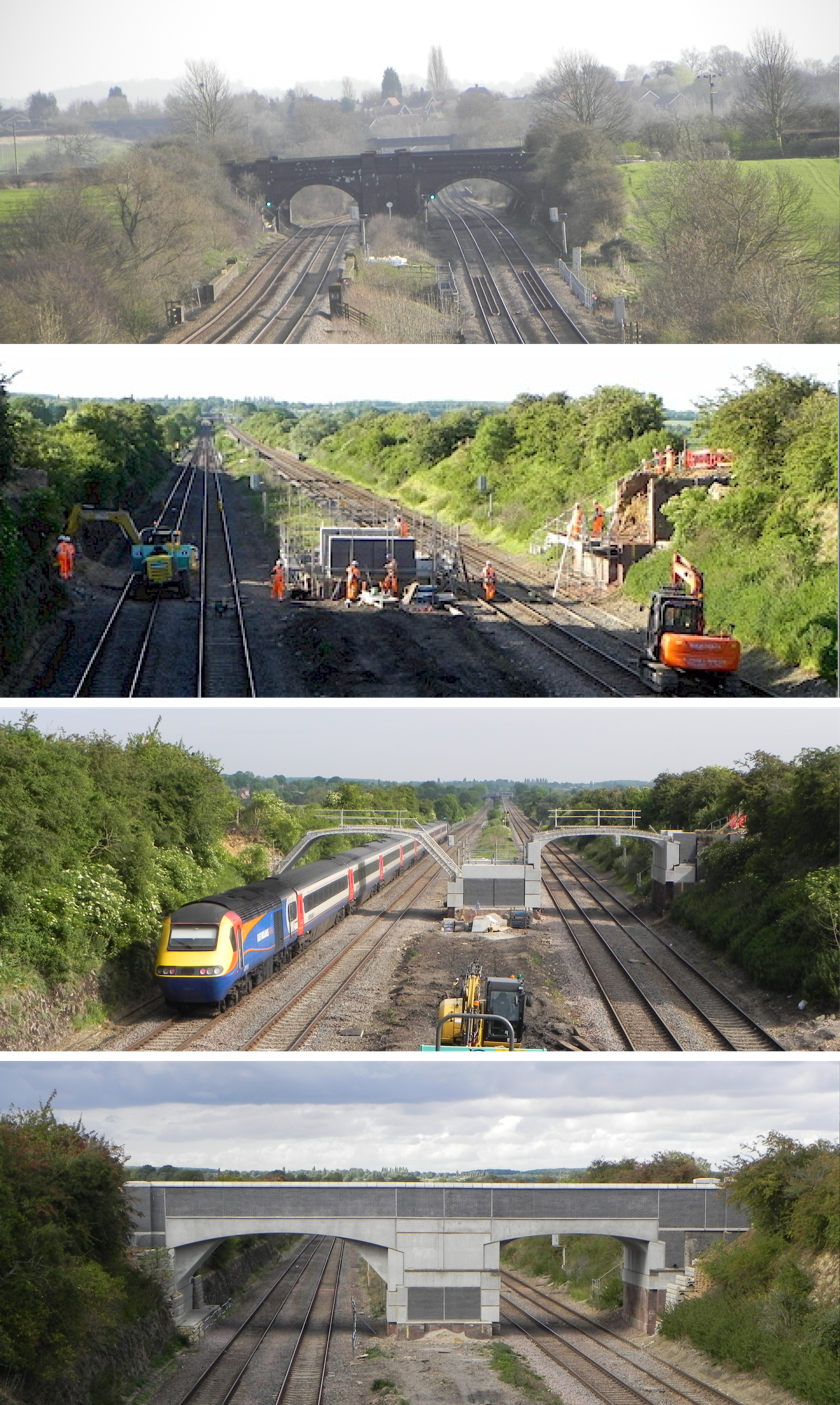
Increasing the structure gauge for a larger loading gauge can involve substantial work. The UK's Midland Main Line being upgraded in 2014.

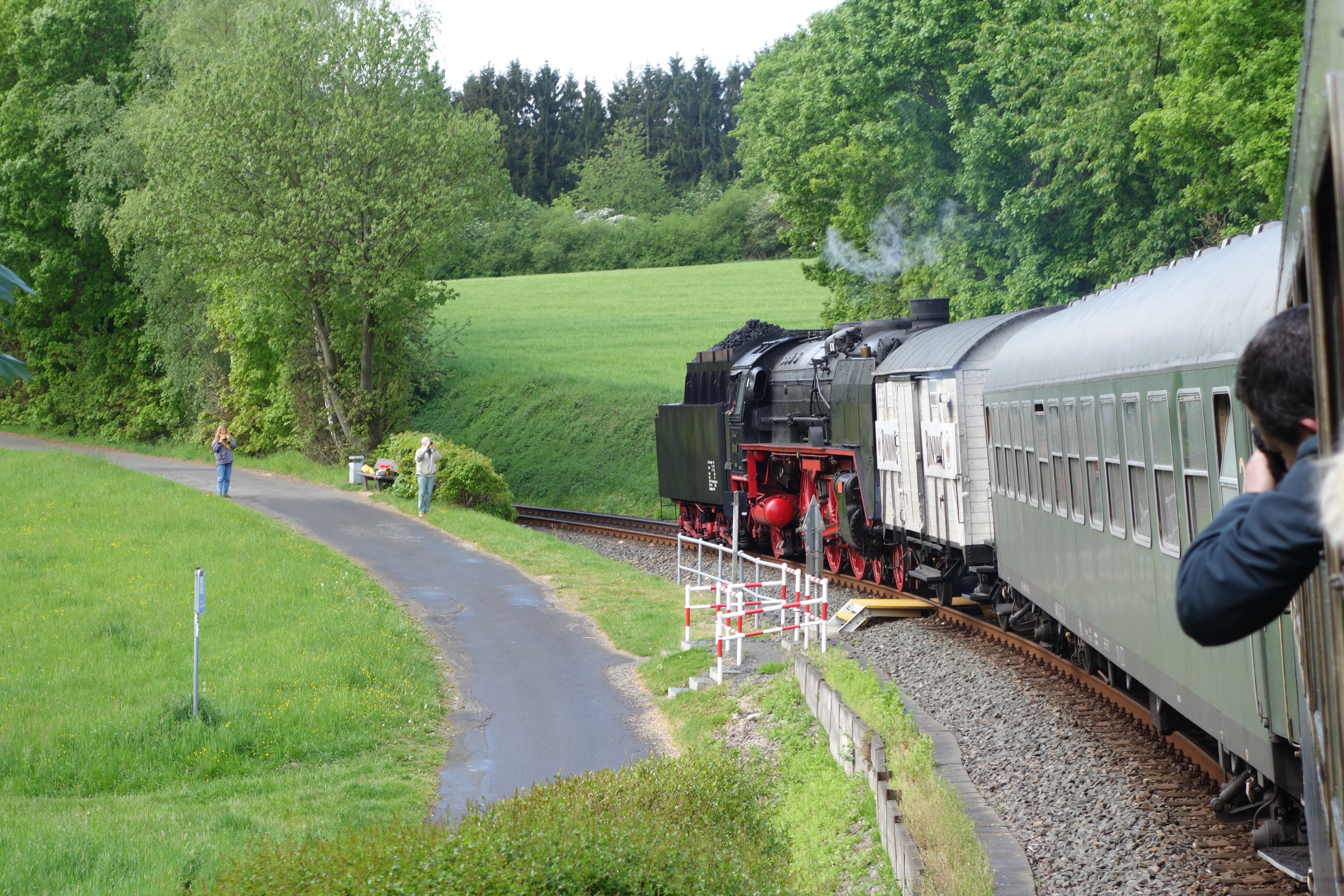
In narrow curves, long cars like this 26.4 m (86 ft 7 in) long express train car protrude further into the gauge than on a straight track. (180° curve near Königstein im Taunus)

A structure gauge, also called the minimum structure outline, is a diagram or physical structure that sets limits to the extent that bridges, tunnels and other infrastructure can encroach on rail vehicles. It specifies the height and width of station platforms, tunnels and bridges, and the width of the doors that allow access to a warehouse from a rail siding. Specifications may include the minimum distance from rail vehicles to railway platforms, buildings, lineside electrical equipment cabinets, signalling equipment, third rails or supports for overhead lines.

A related but separate gauge is the loading gauge: a diagram or physical structure that defines the maximum height and width dimensions in railway vehicles and their loads. The difference between these two gauges is called the clearance. The specified amount of clearance makes allowance for wobbling of rail vehicles at speed or the shifting of vehicles on curves; consequently, in some circumstances a train may be permitted to go past a restricted clearance at very slow speed.

== Road traffic application ==
The term can also be applied to the minimum size of road tunnels, the space beneath overpasses and the space within the superstructure of bridges, as well as doors into automobile repair shops, bus garages, filling stations, residential garages, multi-storey car parks, overhangs at drive-throughs and warehouses.

Eurocode 1: Actions on structures has a definition of "physical clearance" between roadway surface and the underside of bridge element. The code also defines the clearance that is shorter than the physical clearance to account for sag curves, bridge deflection and expected settlements with a recommendation of minimum clearance of 5 metres (16 ft 5 in). In UK, the "standard minimum clearance" for structures over public highways is 16 feet 6 inches (5.03 m). In United States, the "minimum vertical clearance" of overpasses on Interstate Highway System is 16 feet (4.9 m).

== Gallery ==
Structure gauges

Structure gauge for a bridge or other wayside objects
hauteur libre = clear height
Niveau superieur des rails = Top of rails

German structure gauge showing (left side) limits to encroachment of the rail vehicle envelope on mainlines and (right side) secondary tracks

== See also ==
- Air draft, applies to bridges across navigable waterways
- Berne gauge
- Bridge
- Bridge strike
- Clearance car
- Cut
- Disadvantages of third rail (additional infrastructure restrictions)
- Engineering tolerance
- List of bridges known for strikes
- Loading gauge
- Railway platform
- Railway platform height
- Tunnel
- Wayobjects
