= Clearance (civil engineering) =

In civil engineering, clearance refers to the difference between the loading gauge and the structure gauge in the case of railroad cars or trams, or the difference between the size of any vehicle and the width/height of doors, the width/height of an overpass or the diameter of a tunnel as well as the air draft under a bridge, the width of a lock or diameter of a tunnel in the case of watercraft. In addition, there is the difference between the deep draft and the stream bed or sea bed of a waterway.

For roadways and waterways, the clearance is typically specified as the width/height of a structure that the vehicle needs to pass instead of the difference between the vehicle and the structure.

== Railways ==
In railways, clearance is the difference between the loading gauge and the structure gauge. A clearance standard is established using static rolling stock outline (static gauge) as the starting point. This is a cross-sectional outline of a maximum size rolling stock when it is not running. The standard then defines maximum kinematic rolling stock outline for when rolling stocks are running to account for suspension and lateral motion on the track. This is also known as "kinematic envelope". The standard also defines base operating standard for clearance which is larger than the kinematic envelope. This should be maximum outline of the normal rail operation and can only be infringed in special circumstances. The standard then adds another outline called maintenance intervention standard outline that larger than the base operating standard by defining a safety margin (contingency gap) from the kinematic envelope. When there is an infringement of this outline, a maintenance work is required to bring to clearance standard. This establishes the loading gauge. Finally, the standard includes structure outline or structure gauge, leaving a space between the loading gauge and structure gauge as clearance.

== Roadways ==
=== Vertical clearance ===
Minimum vertical clearance above the roadway for railway, flyover, bridge and footbridge structures along and crossing roads in the Philippines

In roadways, vertical clearance is the measurement from the ground or the road pavement to the bottom of overpasses or bridges.

American Association of State Highway Officials (AASHO) established Interstate Highway standards which included minimum vertical clearance of 14 feet (4.3 m). The Department of Defense later informed that the clearance was not sufficient for national defense purposes and wanted the vertical clearance to be raised to 17 feet (5.2 m). Eventually, the new standards were approved in 1960 to have the minimum vertical clearance of new structures to be 16 feet (4.9 m). There were up to 2,650 existing overpasses in 1967 that were not in compliance with the new standards. The decision was made to only raise those 350 overpasses that served up to 95% of major military installations. Other overpasses were left to be reconstructed to the new minimum vertical clearance at later times.

Australia defines minimum vertical clearance based on types of roads. The minimum vertical clearance is 5.4 metres (17 ft 9 in) for main roads and highways, and 4.6 metres (15 ft 1 in) for other local roads with road authority approval. For high and very high clearance roads, the values are between 5.9 metres (19 ft 4 in) and 6.5 metres (21 ft 4 in).

Eurocode 1: Actions on structures has a definition of "physical clearance" between roadway surface and the underside of bridge element. The code also defines the clearance that is shorter than the physical clearance to account for sag curves, bridge deflection and expected settlements) with a recommendation of minimum clearance of 5 metres (16 ft 5 in).

In the Philippines, the Department of Public Works and Highways sets minimum vertical clearance at 4.88 metres (16 ft 0 in) above national highways for structures like flyovers and bridges, with an additional 0.15 metres (5.9 in) allowance for future road surfacing. For pedestrian footbridges, the minimum is 5.33 metres (17 ft 6 in). Structures over navigable waters have a different formula based on the highest water level, vessel height, and an allowance of 1 metre (3 ft 3 in).

In Singapore, the minimum vertical clearance is 5.4 metres (17 ft 9 in). The clearance for overhead signs is 5.7 metres (18 ft 8 in) and the clearance for the soffit or underside of overpasses is 10 metres (32 ft 10 in).

In South Africa and the southern region of Africa, the minimum vertical clearance of modern bridges is 5 metres (16 ft 5 in), although the legal height limit of road vehicles is still at 4.3 metres (14 ft 1 in).

The United Kingdom has a standard on minimum clearance of a public highway at 16 feet 6 inches (5.03 m). Any bridges that do not meet the clearance requirement are considered to be "low bridges" and they require to have signage to indicate the clearance.

==== Bridge and tunnel strikes ====
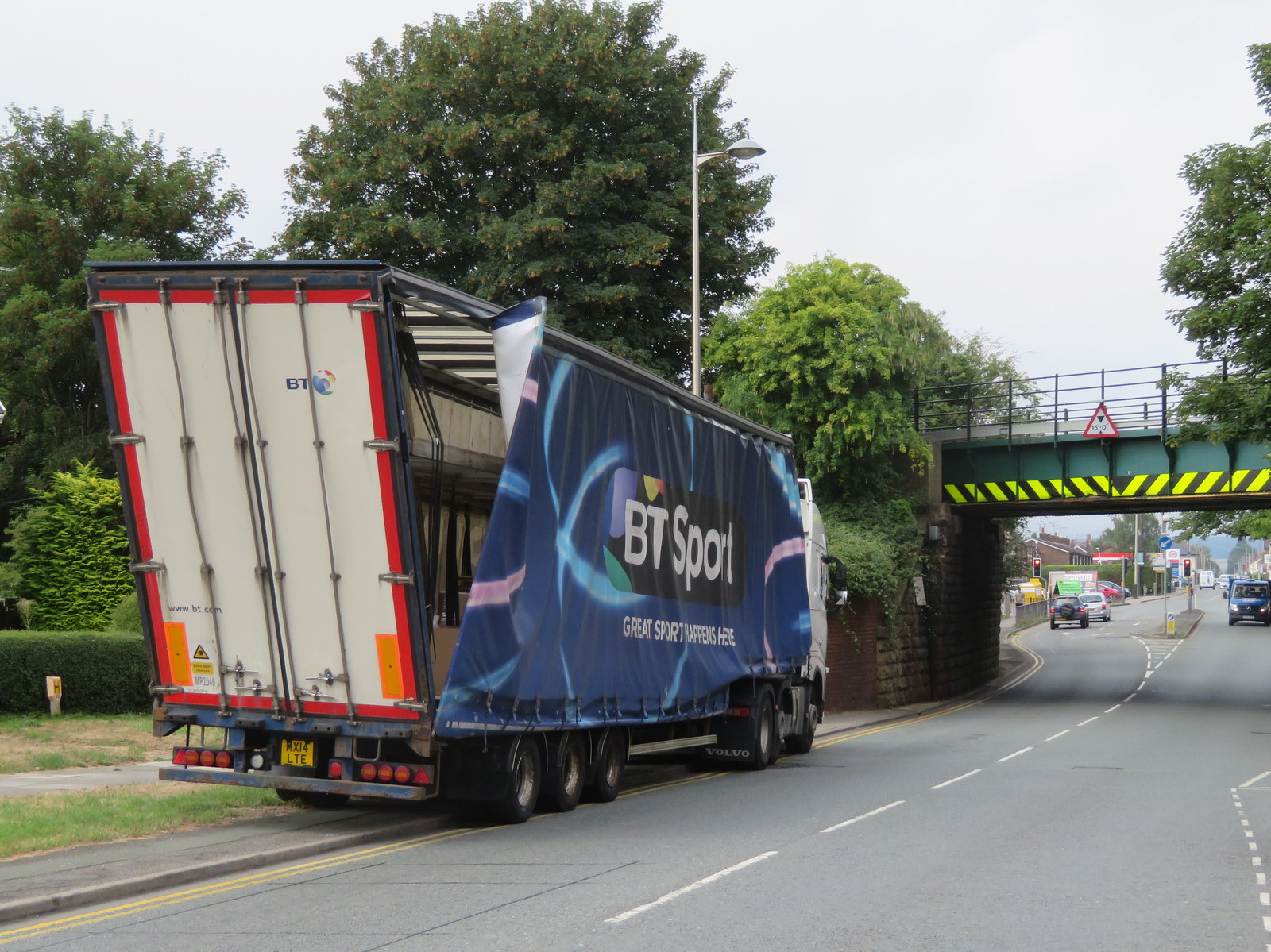
A truck damaged by striking a railway bridge in Saltney in Cheshire in 2018

Bridge or tunnel strikes are collisions of vehicles with bridge or tunnel structures. These may involve over-height vehicles, or low vertical clearance bridges or tunnels. These accidents occur frequently and are a major issue worldwide. In the United Kingdom, railway bridge strikes happen on an average of once every four and half hours with total of 1789 times in 2019. Several bridges being hit over 20 times in a single year. The total cost borne by the state was around £23 million. In Beijing, China, 20% of all bridge damages are caused by bridge strikes. Texas Department of Transportation estimated in 2013 that an average cost to repair a bridge strike is US$180,000.

A 2.7 m (8 ft 10 1/4 in) high overpass bridge near St Petersburg, Russia, is known as the "Bridge of Stupidity" because it is often struck by vehicles despite many warning signs. In May 2018, after it was struck for the 150th time by a GAZelle truck, a birthday cake was presented to the bridge. This made national news.

Similarly, an 11 ft 8 in (3.56 m) overpass in Durham, North Carolina, US, was frequently struck by vehicles, and made the news a number of times until it was raised in 2019.

Infrared sensors, which trigger warning signs when a high vehicle approaches, were added to an underpass in Frauenfeld, Switzerland, only after several incidents.

A similar situation exists at an underpass on Guy Street in Montreal, which has a clearance of 3.75 m (12 ft 4 in).

=== Horizontal clearance ===
In United States, the term "horizontal clearance" is used interchangeably with "lateral offset". This is the space from the edge of the roadway that is clear from vertical obstructions such as sign posts, utility poles, and fire hydrants. The horizontal clearance is used in urban environments where these objects are expected to be near roadways. The horizontal clearance are to prevent overhung elements such as side mirrors of large vehicles driven at the extreme edge of the roads to hit such objects. It also allows opening curbside doors of parked vehicles. Minimum horizontal clearance in US standard is 1.5 feet (0.46 m). Horizontal clearance is not the same concept as clear zone which is used in non-urban highways.

Some countries have specific horizontal clearances from the edge of the roads for specific types of objects next to the roads. For example, India has horizontal clearance of 10 metres (32 ft 10 in) for electrical and telecommunication poles, and 30 centimetres (12 in) for street light poles of roads with curbs. For roads without curbs, the clearance for that is 1.5 metres (4 ft 11 in) given that the minimum clearance from the center line of the roads is 5 metres (16 ft 5 in).

For roadways that require passing under some structures such as tunnels, there are standards on the entire width of the roads known as horizontal curb-to-curb and wall-to-wall clearances. American Association of State Highway and Transportation Officials (AASHTO) recommends having minimum curb-to-curb clearance for two-lane highways of 24 feet (7.3 m) and wall-to-wall clearance of 30 feet (9.1 m), while desired curb-to-curb clearance should be 39 feet (12 m), and wall-to-wall clearance should be 44 feet (13 m).

For bike paths, there are two types of horizontal clearances. The first type is the horizontal clearance of any obstacles on the paths. An example is the use of bollards to prevent cars from entering bike paths. The horizontal clearance on the paths defines a minimum clearance of adjacent obstacles such as those bollards to allow clear flowing of bike traffic. Some European countries have that specification between 1.6 metres (5 ft 3 in) and 1.75 metres (5 ft 9 in). The second type is horizontal clearance next to the paths. This clearance is a distance from the edge of the biking paths to any vertical obstacles such as poles, fences, and tree branches to prevent pedal or handlebar from hitting such obstacles. The clearance values may depend on the heights and types of the obstacles. For example, in Flanders, the horizontal clearance next to the paths for poles, lampposts and trees is 0.75 metres (2 ft 6 in), and for walls and fences is 1 metre (3 ft 3 in). The horizontal clearance from the edge of the path to the curb is based on curb heights. For curbs of heights up to 7 centimetres (2.8 in), the horizontal clearance is 0.25 metres (9.8 in), and for higher curbs, the clearance is 0.5 metres (1 ft 8 in).

== Waterways ==
In waterways, "bridge span clearance" is a measurement from water surface to the underside of bridge span. The most conservative clearance uses the water level at the mean highest high water (MHHW), the average value of the highest high tide of a measurement period. This is known as "clearance below", "vertical clearance" and "charted height"

On other hand, the "overhead clearance" is a measurement from the top most part of a given vessel to the underside of the bridge. The "underkeel clearance" is the distance between the lowest part of a given vessel to the waterway bed.

The other type of clearances for the bridges is "clearance above" the bridge floor. This is the vertical clearances for road traffic on the bridge.

== See also ==
- Air draft
- Engineering tolerance
- Ride height
