= Berne gauge =

Railway loading gauge considered the standard in most of Europe

The Berne Gauge or Berne Convention Gauge is an informal but widely used term for the railway loading gauge considered the standard minimum loading gauge in most of Europe. The term arises from the international railway conference held and consequent convention signed in Bern, Switzerland in 1912. The official name of this gauge is the Gabarit passe-partout international (PPI, literally "pass-everywhere international gauge"), and it came into force in 1914.

The European (Berne) loading gauge is usually 3,150 mm (10 ft 4 in) wide by 3,175 mm (10 ft 5.0 in) rising to 4,280 mm (14 ft 1 in) in the centre. This is a clearance envelope (see loading gauge) on a curve of 250 m (820 ft 3 in) radius.

Previously, international through traffic, particularly freight, had been effectively constrained to vehicles and loads consistent with the standard French loading gauge, the narrowest and lowest in Mainland Europe. As a result of accepting the convention, the French embarked on a period of progressive upgrade to make their network compliant.

== Comparison ==
Even after adopting the convention, significant parts of the European network, such as Belgium and former Germanic and Austrian possessions, as well as Scandinavia, operated to larger gauges, thus restricting the interchange of traffic from those areas.

Although the name "PPI" includes the characterisation as "international" it is actually the minimum standard just in Western Europe. The contiguous rail network in North America has a minimum width of 3,250 mm (10 ft 8 in) and a minimum height of 4,620 millimetres (15 ft 2 in). The standard gauge rail network in Eastern Asia is built to a minimum width of 3,400 millimetres (11 ft 2 in), and the Chinese CRH2 as well as the Japanese 0 Series Shinkansen have a width of 3,380 millimetres (11 ft 1 in). Similarly the tracks in Sweden are built to 3,400 mm (clearance SE-A and SE-B) just as the broad-gauge network under Russian influence (on tracks with 1,520 mm). As such the Russian Velaro Sapsan and the Chinese Velaro CRH3 have widths of 3,265 millimetres (10 ft 8.5 in) while the German variant Velaro ICE 3 is built to 2,950 millimetres (9 ft 8 in) to fit in the PPI outline. Parts of the German network are built to accommodate wider trains from neighbouring countries. In a research project for ICE 4 a width of 3,300 millimetres (10 ft 10 in) was tested but not pushed into production.

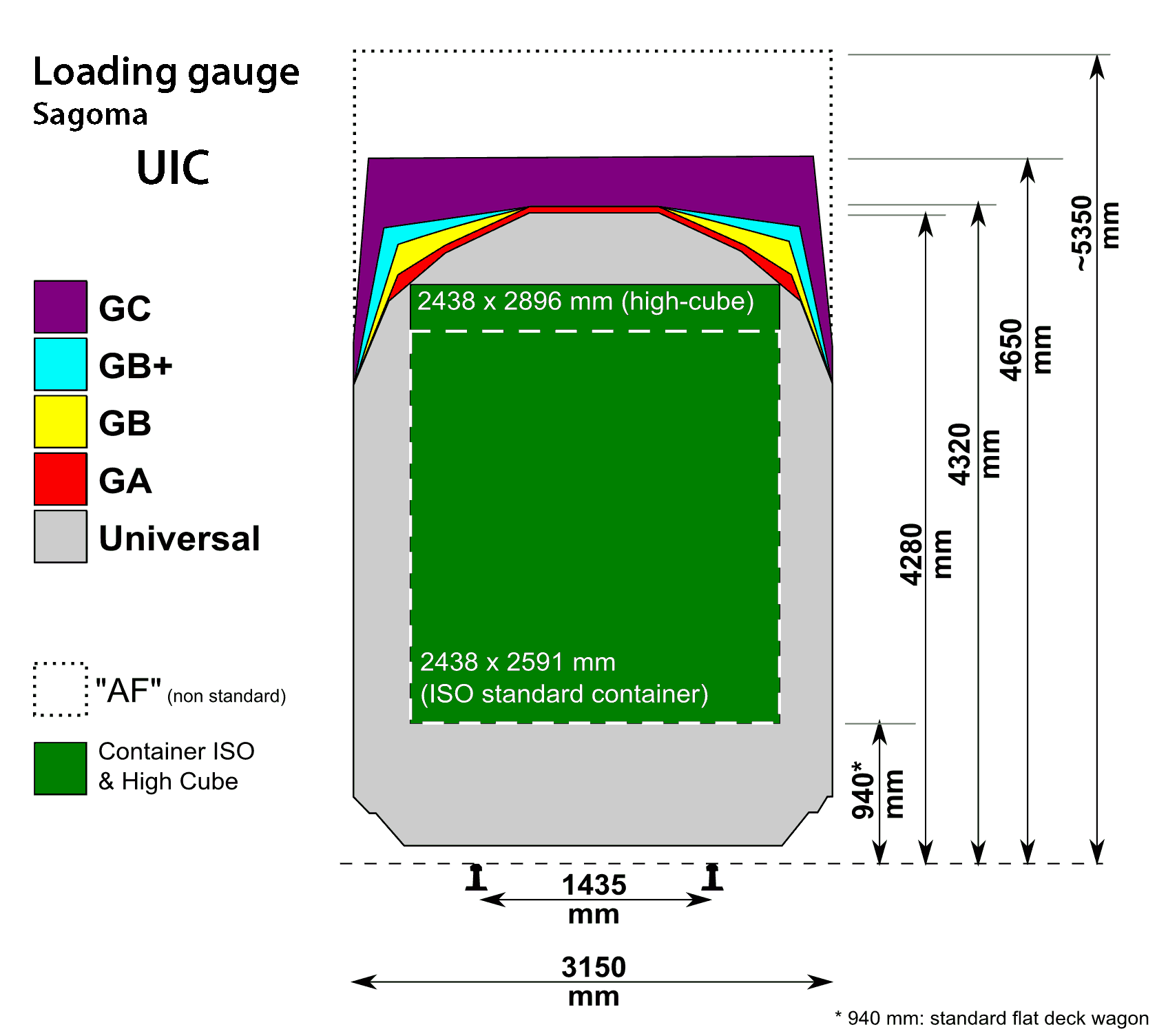
container profiles in UIC loading gauges

== European freight network ==
The success of the intermodal shipping containers led to some adaptations to allow ISO containers with a height of 2,600 millimetres (8 ft 6 in) or Hi-Cube containers with a height of 2,900 millimetres (9 ft 6 in) to be carried by rail in Western Europe. In general the deck height of flatcars was reduced to 940 mm (37 in) to allow for shipping containers to fit in the "GB" clearance in France. It was further modified so that for the minimum height of the exterior walls (3,175 mm (10 ft 5.0 in)) and the minimum height at the center (4,320 mm (14 ft 2 in)) a third height was added such that at a width of 2,720 mm (8 ft 11 in) a minimum height of 4,180 mm (13 ft 9 in) is ensured. This profile was dubbed "GB+" and has a roof that is almost flat. All modern freight tracks in Western Europe are built to this size, the modern replacement for the PPI minimum international loading gauge.

By comparison, the central European "GC" loading gauge allows the use traditional flatcars with a deck height of 1,100 to 1,300 mm (3 ft 7 in to 4 ft 3 in) to carry intermodal shipping containers. Trains with Hi-Cube containers can not pass from Germany into France.
