= Envelope (motion) =

In mechanical engineering, an envelope is a solid representing all positions which may be occupied by an object during its normal range of motion.

Another (jargon) word for this is a "flop".

== Wheel envelope ==
In automobile design, a wheel envelope may be used to model all positions a wheel and tire combo may be expected to occupy during driving. This will take into account the maximum jounce and rebound allowed by the suspension system and the maximum turn and tilt allowed by the steering mechanism. Minimum and maximum tire inflation pressures and wear conditions may also be considered when generating the envelope.

This envelope is then compared with the wheel housing and other components in the area to perform an interference/collision analysis. The results of this analysis tell the engineers whether that wheel/tire combo will strike the housing and components under normal driving conditions. If so, either a redesign is in order, or that wheel/tire combo will not be recommended.

A different wheel envelope must be generated for each wheel/tire combo for which the vehicle is rated. Much of this analysis is done using CAD/CAE systems running on computers. Of course, high speed collisions, during an accident, are not considered "normal driving conditions", so the wheel and tire may very well contact other parts of the vehicle at that time.

== Robot's working envelope ==
In robotics, the working envelope or work area is the volume of working or reaching space. Some factors of a robot's design (configurations, axes or degrees of freedom) influence its working envelope.
